= List of songs recorded by All Time Low =

This is a comprehensive list of songs by the American rock band All Time Low.

== Original songs ==
Title	Release	Year
"[Cold Open]"	Everyone's Talking!	2025
"Afterglow"	Last Young Renegade	2017
"Are You There?"	Tell Me I'm Alive	2023
"Backseat Serenade" featuring Cassadee Pope	Don't Panic	2012
"Bad Enough For You"	Dirty Work (deluxe)	2011
"Bail Me Out" featuring Joel Madden	Future Hearts	2015
"Basement Noise"	Wake Up, Sunshine	2020
"The Beach"	So Wrong, It's Right	2007
"Birthday"	Birthday (single)	2018
"Bottle and a Beat"	Future Hearts	2015
"Break Out! Break Out!"	The Party Scene, Put Up or Shut Up, Hopelessly Devoted To You Vol. 6	2005
"Break Your Little Heart"	Nothing Personal	2009
"Bubblegum"	Everyone's Talking!	2025
"Butterflies"	Everyone's Talking!	2025
"Calm Down"	Tell Me I'm Alive	2023
"Canals"	Don't Panic: It's Longer Now!	2013
"Caroline"	Straight To DVD II: Past, Present, and Future Hearts	2016
"Chemistry"	Last Young Renegade	2017
"Cigarettes & Sabotage"	Everyone's Talking!	2025
"Cinderblock Garden"	Future Hearts	2015
"Circles"	The Party Scene	2005
"Clumsy"	Wake Up, Sunshine	2020
"Coffee Shop Soundtrack"	Put Up or Shut Up, Take Action! Vol. 6	2006
"Come One, Come All"	So Wrong, It's Right	2007
"Damned If I Do Ya (Damned If I Don't)"	Nothing Personal, American Pie: The Book of Love Soundtrack	2009
"Dancing With a Wolf"	Future Hearts	2015
"Dark Side of Your Room"	Last Young Renegade	2017
"A Daydream Away"	Dirty Work	2011
"Dear Maria, Count Me In"	So Wrong, It's Right	2007
"Different Languages"	Everyone's Talking!	2025
"Dirty Laundry"	Last Young Renegade	2017
"Do You Want Me (Dead?)"	Dirty Work	2011
"Don't You Go"	Future Hearts	2015
"Drugs and Candy"	Last Young Renegade	2017
"The Edge of Tonight"	Future Hearts	2015
"English Blood // American Heartache"	Tell Me I'm Alive	2023
"Everyone's Talking"	Everyone's Talking!	2025
"Everything Is Fine"	Everything Is Fine (single)	2018
"Fake as Hell" with Avril Lavigne	Fake as Hell (single)	2023
"Falling for Strangers"	Everyone's Talking!	2025
"Favorite Place" featuring The Band CAMINO	Wake Up, Sunshine	2020
"Fool's Holiday"	Punk Goes Christmas	2013
"For Baltimore"	Don't Panic	2012
"Forget About It"	Dirty Work	2011
"Get Down On Your Knees And Tell Me That You Love Me"	Dirty Work (deluxe)	2011
"Getaway Green"	Wake Up, Sunshine	2020
"The Girl's a Straight Up Hustler"	The Party Scene, Put Up or Shut Up	2005
"Glitter & Crimson"	Wake Up, Sunshine	2020
"Good Night, C'est La Vie"	Everyone's Talking!	2025
"Good Times"	Last Young Renegade	2017
"Ground Control" featuring Tegan and Sara	Last Young Renegade	2017
"Guts"	Dirty Work	2011
"Hate This Song" with I Prevail	True Power (Expanded)	2024
"Hello Brooklyn"	Nothing Personal	2009
"Heroes"	Dirty Work	2011
"Hit the Lights (Tribute to a Night I'll Never Forget)"	The Three Words to Remember in Dealing with the End EP	2004
"Holly (Would You Turn Me On?)"	So Wrong, It's Right	2007
"Hometown Heroes; National Nobodies"	The Party Scene	2005
"How The Story Ends"	Future Hearts	2015
"I Can't Do The One-Two Step"	The Party Scene	2005
"I Feel Like Dancin'"	Dirty Work	2011
"I Hate That For You"	Wake Up, Sunshine	2020
"I'd Be Fine (If I Never Saw You Again)"	Tell Me I'm Alive	2023
"If These Sheets Were States"	Don't Panic	2012
"The Irony Of Choking On a Lifesaver"	Don't Panic	2012
"January Gloom (Seasons, Pt. 1)"	Wake Up, Sunshine	2020
"Jasey Rae"	Put Up or Shut Up	2006
"Just The Way I'm Not"	Dirty Work	2011
"Keep The Change, You Filthy Animal"	Nothing Personal	2009
"Kicking & Screaming"	Future Hearts	2015
"Kids In The Dark"	Future Hearts	2015
"Kill Ur Vibe"	Tell Me I'm Alive	2023
"Last Flight Home"	The Three Words to Remember in Dealing with the End EP	2004
"Last Young Renegade"	Last Young Renegade	2017
"Let It Roll"	So Wrong, It's Right	2007
"Life of the Party"	Last Young Renegade	2017
"Little Bit"	Everyone's Talking!	2025
"Lost in Stereo"	Nothing Personal	2009
"Lost Along the Way"	Tell Me I'm Alive	2023
"A Love Like War" featuring Vic Fuentes	Don't Panic: It's Longer Now!	2013
"Lullabies"	The Party Scene, Put Up or Shut Up	2005
"Me Without You (All I Ever Wanted)"	Don't Panic: It's Longer Now!	2013
"Melancholy Kaleidoscope"	Wake Up, Sunshine	2020
"Memories That Fade Like Photographs"	The Three Words to Remember in Dealing with the End EP	2004
"Merry Christmas, Kiss My Ass"	Dirty Work (deluxe)	2011
"Missing You"	Future Hearts	2015
"Modern Love"	Tell Me I'm Alive	2023
"Monsters" featuring blackbear	Wake Up, Sunshine	2020
"My Only One"	Dirty Work (deluxe)	2011
"New Religion" featuring Teddy Swims	Tell Me I'm Alive	2023
"The Next Best Thing"	The Three Words to Remember in Dealing with the End EP	2004
"Nice2KnoU"	Last Young Renegade	2017
"Nightmares"	Last Young Renegade	2017
"No Idea"	Dirty Work	2011
"Noel"	The Party Scene	2005
"Oh, Calamity"	Don't Panic: It's Longer Now!	2013
"Oh, No!"	Everyone's Talking!	2025
"Old Scars/Future Hearts"	Future Hearts	2015
"Once in a Lifetime"	Once in a Lifetime (single)	2021
"The Other Side"	Tell Me I'm Alive	2023
"Outlines" featuring Jason Vena	Don't Panic	2012
"Paint You Wings"	Don't Panic	2012
"Painting Flowers"	Almost Alice	2010
"The Party Scene"	The Party Scene, Put Up or Shut Up	2005
"A Party Song (The Walk Of Shame)"	Nothing Personal	2009
"PMA" featuring Pale Waves	PMA (single)	2021
"Poison"	Nothing Personal (bonus track)	2009
"Poppin' Champagne"	So Wrong, It's Right, Take Action! Vol. 8	2007
"Pretty Venom (Interlude)"	Wake Up, Sunshine	2020
"The Reckless And The Brave"	Don't Panic	2012
"Remembering Sunday" featuring Juliet Simms	So Wrong, It's Right, Take Action! Vol. 8	2007
"Return The Favor"	Dirty Work	2011
"Runaways"	Future Hearts	2015
"Running From Lions"	The Party Scene, Put Up or Shut Up	2005
"Safe"	Wake Up, Sunshine	2020
"Satellite"	Future Hearts	2015
"Shameless"	So Wrong, It's Right	2007
"Sick Little Games"	Nothing Personal	2009
"Six Feet Under The Stars"	So Wrong, It's Right	2007
"Sleeping In"	Wake Up, Sunshine	2020
"Sleepwalking"	Tell Me I'm Alive	2023
"So Long Soldier" featuring Anthony Raneri and Cassadee Pope	Don't Panic	2012
"So Long, And Thanks For All The Booze"	Don't Panic	2012
"Some Kind of Disaster"	Wake Up, Sunshine	2020
"Something's Gotta Give"	Future Hearts	2015
"Somewhere in Neverland"	Don't Panic	2012
"The Sound Of Letting Go"	Tell Me I'm Alive	2023
"Stay Awake (Dreams Only Last for a Night)"	So Wrong, It's Right	2007
"Stella"	Nothing Personal	2009
"Sticks, Stones and Techno"	The Party Scene	2005
"Suckerpunch"	Everyone's Talking!	2025
"Sugar" featuring JoJo	Everyone's Talking!	2025
"Summer Daze (Seasons, Pt. 2)"	Wake Up, Sunshine	2020
"Take Cover"	Straight To DVD II: Past, Present, and Future Hearts	2016
"Tell Me I'm Alive"	Tell Me I'm Alive	2023
"Thanks To You"	Don't Panic	2012
"That Girl"	Dirty Work	2011
"Therapy"	Nothing Personal	2009
"This Is How We Do"	So Wrong, It's Right	2007
"Tidal Waves" featuring Mark Hoppus	Future Hearts	2015
"Time-Bomb"	Dirty Work	2011
"To Live And Let Go"	Don't Panic	2012
"Too Much"	Nothing Personal	2009
"Toxic Valentine"	Jennifer's Body Soundtrack	2009
"Tread Water" featuring Ruston Kelly	Everyone's Talking!	2025
"Trouble Is"	Wake Up, Sunshine	2020
"Under A Paper Moon"	Dirty Work	2011
"Vampire Shift"	Last Young Renegade	2017
"Vegas"	So Wrong, It's Right	2007
"Viva Las Vagus Nerve"	Everyone's Talking!	2025
"Wake Up, Sunshine"	Wake Up, Sunshine	2020
"Walls"	Nothing Personal	2009
"The Way You Miss Me"	Tell Me I'm Alive	2023
"We Say Summer"	The Party Scene	2005
"The Weather"	Everyone's Talking!	2025
"Weightless"	Nothing Personal	2009
"Your Bed"	Future Hearts	2015

== Covers ==
Title	Release	Year	Original Artist
"Alejandro"	Radio 1's Live Lounge – Volume 5	2010	Lady Gaga
"American Idiot"	Back to the Future Hearts 2015	2015	Green Day
"Blinding Lights"	Blinding Lights	2022	The Weeknd
"Elastic Heart"	Radio 1's Live Lounge	2015	Sia
"Fat Lip"	Back to the Future Hearts 2015	2015	Sum 41
"Green Light"	Radio 1's Live Lounge	2017	Lorde
"Hands To Myself"	SiriusXM Hits1	2016	Selena Gomez
"Longview"	Spotify Landmark Green Day: The Early Years	2017	Green Day
"Love Me Like You Do"	SiriusXM Hits1	2015	Ellie Goulding
"Time to Break Up"	A Tribute To Blink 182	2005	Blink-182
"True Colors"	Love Is Hopeless 2013	2013	Cyndi Lauper
"Umbrella"	Punk Goes Crunk	2008	Rihanna

== Unreleased original songs ==
Title	Period	Type
"Actors"	2010	Demo
"Art Of The State"	2011	Demo
"Oh Connor Wee Connor"	2014	Live
"Light The Way"	2003	Demo
"Living The Dream"	2008	Live
"My Paradise"	2003	Demo
"We All Fall Down"	2003	Demo
