= All Time Low discography =

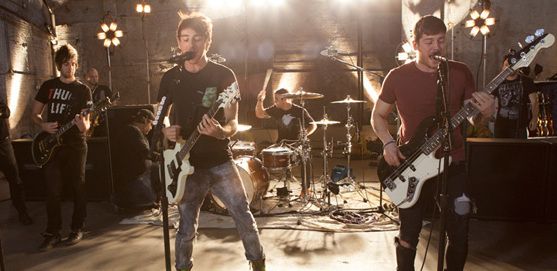
- All Time Low performing live in 2012.
- Studio albums: 10
- Extended plays: 7
- Live albums: 2
- Singles: 39
- Music videos: 43
- Compilation appearances: 11
- Promotional singles: 10

American rock band All Time Low has released ten studio albums, six EPs, two live albums, thirty-nine singles, forty-three music videos, and ten promotional singles.

Beginning as a high school band in 2003, All Time Low released their debut EP The Three Words to Remember in Dealing with the End EP in 2004 through local label Emerald Moon Records, and their first studio album The Party Scene in 2005. While on tour with other bands, they caught the attention of Hopeless Records and signed to them, releasing the Put Up or Shut Up EP in 2006 which reached number 20 on the US Billboard Independent Albums chart. All Time Low's second studio album, So Wrong, It's Right came out in 2007 and became an underground success. Despite never entering the charts or attaining commercial radio play, the album's second single "Dear Maria, Count Me In" was certified three-times platinum in 2023 by the Recording Industry Association of America for shipments of 3,000,000 copies.

Nothing Personal was released as the band's third studio album, debuting at number four on the US Billboard 200 and exceeding commercial expectations with 63,000 sales in its first week. The lead single, "Weightless", peaked at number four on the US Billboard Bubbling Under Hot 100 chart, with the follow-up single, "Damned If I Do Ya (Damned If I Don't)", becoming the band's first appearance on the Billboard Hot 100 at number 67.

All Time Low released their first live album, Straight to DVD, in 2010. During the recording of All Time Low's fourth studio album, the band contributed the song "Painting Flowers" to the Almost Alice soundtrack. "Painting Flowers" debuted and peaked at number five on the Bubbling Under Hot 100 chart. Dirty Work was released the band's fourth album in 2011 as the band's major label debut on Interscope Records. It debuted and peaked at number six on the Billboard 200 with 45,000 first-week sales. Its lead single "I Feel Like Dancin'" reached number 13 on the Bubbling Under Hot 100 chart and number 39 on the Pop Songs chart. All Time Low announced their departure from Interscope in May 2012, and uploaded "The Reckless and the Brave" on their website as a free download.

In July 2012, All Time Low returned to Hopeless Records and released their fifth studio album on October 9, Don't Panic. The album was re-released as a deluxe edition on September 30, 2013 under the revised title, Don't Panic: It's Longer Now!. The single "A Love Like War" is exclusive to the re-release and features guest vocals by Vic Fuentes of Pierce the Veil. It reached number 23 on the Bubbling Under Hot 100 chart and number 17 on the Rock Songs chart, becoming the band's first single to chart in the US since "Time-Bomb" in 2011.

All Time Low's 2017 song "Good Times" became the band's most successful single on radio to date, peaking at number 13 on the Adult Pop Songs chart. It was later surpassed by their 2020 single "Monsters", which peaked at number one on the Alternative Songs chart, remaining there for 18 weeks. It made an appearance on the Billboard Hot 100, peaking at No. 55, their first entry in a decade.

== Albums ==
=== Studio albums ===
List of studio albums, with selected chart positions and certifications
| Title | Album details | Peak chart positions | | | | | | | | | | Certifications |
| Title | Album details | US | AUS | BEL (FL) | CAN | GER | JPN | IRL | NLD | SWE | UK | Certifications |
|---|---|---|---|---|---|---|---|---|---|---|---|---|
| The Party Scene | Released: July 19, 2005 (US); Label: Emerald Moon (EMR008); Formats: CD | — | — | — | — | — | — | — | — | — | — | |
| So Wrong, It's Right | Released: September 25, 2007 (US); Label: Hopeless (HR693); Formats: CD, DL, LP | 62 | — | — | — | — | 167 | — | — | — | — | RIAA: Platinum; BPI: Silver |
| Nothing Personal | Released: July 7, 2009 (US); Label: Hopeless (HR710); Formats: CD, DL, LP | 4 | 71 | — | 22 | — | 69 | — | 86 | 22 | 104 | RIAA: Gold; BPI: Gold |
| Dirty Work | Released: June 7, 2011 (US); Label: DGC (B0015352-02FL02); Formats: CD, DL, LP | 6 | 13 | 83 | 13 | — | 41 | 34 | 67 | — | 20 | BPI: Silver |
| Don't Panic | Released: October 9, 2012 (US); Label: Hopeless (HR760); Formats: CD, DL, LP | 6 | 13 | 65 | 18 | — | 55 | 25 | 34 | 43 | 9 | BPI: Silver |
| Future Hearts | Released: April 7, 2015 (US); Label: Hopeless (HR2129); Formats: CD, CS, DL, LP | 2 | 4 | 27 | 3 | 60 | 37 | 7 | 18 | 53 | 1 | BPI: Gold |
| Last Young Renegade | Released: June 2, 2017 (US); Label: Fueled by Ramen; Formats: CD, DL, LP | 9 | 5 | 28 | 38 | 47 | 81 | 18 | 45 | — | 7 | |
| Wake Up, Sunshine | Released: April 3, 2020 (US); Label: Fueled by Ramen; Formats: CD, CS, DL, LP | 31 | 12 | — | 92 | 49 | 171 | — | — | — | 3 | |
| Tell Me I'm Alive | Released: March 17, 2023 (US); Label: Fueled by Ramen; Formats: CD, CS, DL, LP | — (Note: Tell Me I'm Alive did not enter the US Billboard 200, but peaked at number 37 on the Album Sales Chart.) | 38 | — | — | 87 | — | — | — | — | 12 | |
| Everyone's Talking! | Released: October 17, 2025 (US); Label: Basement Noise / Photo Finish Records; Formats: CD, CS, DL, LP | 192 | 79 | — | — | — | — | — | — | — | 68 | |
"—" denotes a recording that did not chart or was not released in that territory.

==== Re-recordings ====
List of re-recorded albums
| Title | Album details | Peak chart positions |
| Title | Album details | UK DL |
|---|---|---|
| It's Still Nothing Personal: A Ten Year Tribute | Released: November 8, 2019 (US); Label: Fueled by Ramen; Formats: DL | 62 |
| The Forever Sessions - Vol. 1 | Released: August 23, 2024 (US); Label: Basement Noise / Photo Finish Records; Formats: CD, CS, DL, LP | 54 |

=== Live albums ===
List of live albums, with selected chart positions
| Title | Album details | Peak chart positions | | | | | | | | | | Certifications |
| Title | Album details | US | US Rock | AUS | BEL (FL) | FIN | JPN | NLD | SCO | SWE | UK | Certifications |
|---|---|---|---|---|---|---|---|---|---|---|---|---|
| Straight to DVD | Released: May 25, 2010 (US); Label: Hopeless; Formats: CD+DVD-V, DL | 58 | 16 | — | — | — | 169 | — | 89 | 52 | 126 | RIAA: Gold; BPI: Silver |
| Straight to DVD II: Past, Present and Future Hearts | Released: September 9, 2016; Label: Hopeless; Formats: CD+DVD-V, DVD-V+LP, DL | 41 | 13 | 22 | 78 | 7 | — | 88 | 26 | — | 40 | |
| Alive at Wembley | Released: November 24, 2023; Label: Fueled By Ramen; Formats: LP | — | — | — | — | — | — | — | — | — | — (Note: Alive at Wembley did not enter the UK Albums Chart, but peaked at number 25 on the UK Record Store Chart.) | |
"—" denotes releases that did not chart or were not released in that territory.

== Extended plays ==
List of extended plays, with selected chart positions
| Title | Album details | Peak chart positions | | | | | |
| Title | Album details | US | US Alt. | US Indie | US Rock | UK | UK Indie |
|---|---|---|---|---|---|---|---|
| All Time Low Demo | Released: November 2003; Label: Self-released; Formats: CD-R | — | — | — | — | — | — |
| The Three Words to Remember in Dealing with the End EP | Released: October 1, 2004; Label: Emerald Moon; Formats: CD | — | — | — | — | — | — |
| Put Up or Shut Up | Released: July 25, 2006 (US); Label: Hopeless; Formats: CD, DL, LP | — (Note: Put Up or Shut Up did not enter the US Billboard 200, but peaked at number 12 on the US Heatseekers Albums Chart.) | — | 20 | — | — | — |
| Live from MySpace Secret Shows | Released: August 14, 2009 (US); Label: Myspace; Formats: DL | — | — | — | — | — | — |
| Live Session | Released: November 17, 2009 (US); Label: Hopeless; Formats: DL | — | — | — | — | — | — |
| MTV Unplugged: All Time Low | Released: January 12, 2010 (US); Label: Hopeless; Formats: CD+DVD-V, DL | 92 | 24 | 7 | 34 | 176 | 23 |
| Everything Is Fine On Your Birthday | Released: September 28, 2018; Label: Fueled By Ramen; Formats: DL, 7" | — | — | — | — | — | — |
"—" denotes a recording that did not chart or was not released in that territory.

== Singles ==
List of singles, with selected chart positions and certifications, showing year released and album name
| Title | Year | Peak chart positions | | | | | | | | | | Certifications | Album |
| Title | Year | US | US Rock | AUS | BLR | CAN Rock | CZ | HUN | NLD | SCO | UK | Certifications | Album |
|---|---|---|---|---|---|---|---|---|---|---|---|---|---|
| "Dear Maria, Count Me In" | 2008 | — | × (Note: "Dear Maria, Count Me In" did not enter the Hot Rock & Alternative Songs chart, which didn't exist prior to 2009, but peaked at number 13 on the Rock Digital Song Sales chart.) | — | — | — | — | — | — | — | — | RIAA: 4× Platinum; BPI: Platinum; RMNZ: Platinum | So Wrong, It's Right |
| "Poppin' Champagne" | 2008 | — (Note: "Poppin' Champagne" did not enter the Billboard Hot 100, but peaked at number two on the Hot Singles Sales chart.) | × | — | — | — | — | — | — | — | — | | So Wrong, It's Right |
| "Weightless" | 2009 | — (Note: "Weightless" did not enter the Billboard Hot 100, but peaked at number four on the Bubbling Under Hot 100 Singles chart.) | — | — | — | — | — | — | — (Note: "Weightless" did not enter the Netherlands Singles Chart but peaked on the Dutch Tipparade Chart at number six.) | 85 | 100 | RIAA: Platinum; BPI: Silver | Nothing Personal |
| "Damned If I Do Ya (Damned If I Don't)" | 2009 | 67 | — | — | — | — | — | — | — | — | — | RIAA: Gold | Nothing Personal |
| "Lost in Stereo" | 2010 | — | — | — | — | — | — | — | 8 | 57 | 63 | | Nothing Personal |
| "I Feel Like Dancin'" | 2011 | — (Note: "I Feel Like Dancin'" did not enter the Billboard Hot 100, but peaked at number 13 on the Bubbling Under Hot 100 Singles chart.) | — (Note: "I Feel Like Dancin" did not enter the Hot Rock & Alternative Songs chart, but peaked at number nine on the Rock Digital Song Sales chart.) | — | — | — | — | — | — | 72 | 85 | | Dirty Work |
| "Forget About It" | 2011 | — | — | — | — | — | — | — | — | — | — | | Dirty Work |
| "Time-Bomb" | 2011 | — (Note: "Time-Bomb" did not enter the Billboard Hot 100, but peaked at number 21 on the Bubbling Under Hot 100 Singles chart.) | — (Note: "Time Bomb" did not enter the Hot Rock & Alternative Songs chart, but peaked at number 13 on the Rock Digital Song Sales chart.) | — | — | — | — | — | — | — | — | | Dirty Work |
| "Guts" | 2012 | — | — | — | — | — | — | — | — | — | — | | Dirty Work |
| "For Baltimore" | 2012 | — | — (Note: "For Baltimore" did not enter the Hot Rock & Alternative Songs chart, but peaked at number 42 on the Rock Digital Song Sales chart.) | — | — | — | — | — | — | 83 | 136 | | Don't Panic |
| "Somewhere in Neverland" | 2012 | — | — (Note: "Somewhere in Neverland" did not enter the Hot Rock & Alternative Songs chart, but peaked at number 26 on the Rock Digital Song Sales chart.) | — | — | — | — | — | — | 70 | 111 | | Don't Panic |
| "Backseat Serenade" | 2013 | — | — | — | — | — | — | — | — | — | — | | Don't Panic |
| "A Love Like War" (featuring Vic Fuentes) | 2013 | — (Note: "A Love Like War" did not enter the Billboard Hot 100, but peaked at number 22 on the Bubbling Under Hot 100 Singles chart.) | 17 | 93 | — | — | — | — | — | 45 | 56 | RIAA: Gold | Don't Panic |
| "Something's Gotta Give" | 2015 | — (Note: "Something's Gotta Give" did not enter the Billboard Hot 100, but peaked at number 21 on the Bubbling Under Hot 100 Singles chart.) | 14 | — | — | — | — | — | — | 40 | 84 | | Future Hearts |
| "Kids in the Dark" | 2015 | — | 24 | — | — | — | — | — | — | 49 | 105 | BPI: Silver | Future Hearts |
| "Dirty Laundry" | 2017 | — | 16 | — | — | — | — | 31 | — | 34 | 91 | | Last Young Renegade |
| "Last Young Renegade" | 2017 | — | 33 | — | — | — | — | — | — | 84 | — | | Last Young Renegade |
| "Life of the Party" | 2017 | — | — | — | — | — | — | — | — | — | — | | Last Young Renegade |
| "Nice2KnoU" | 2017 | — | — | — | — | — | — | — | — | — | — | | Last Young Renegade |
| "Good Times" | 2017 | — | 23 | — | — | — | — | — | — | — | — | | Last Young Renegade |
| "Everything Is Fine" | 2018 | — | — (Note: "Everything Is Fine" did not enter the Hot Rock & Alternative Songs chart, but peaked at number 24 on the Alternative Digital Song Sales chart.) | — | — | — | — | — | — | — | — | | Everything Is Fine On Your Birthday |
| "Birthday" | 2018 | — | — (Note: "Birthday" did not enter the Hot Rock & Alternative Songs chart, but peaked at number 17 on the Alternative Digital Song Sales chart.) | — | — | — | — | — | — | — | — (Note: "Birthday" did not enter the UK Singles Chart, but peaked at number three on the UK Physical Singles Chart.) | | Everything Is Fine On Your Birthday |
| "Some Kind of Disaster" | 2020 | — | 27 | — | — | — | — | — | — | — | — | | Wake Up, Sunshine |
| "Sleeping In" | 2020 | — | — | — | — | — | — | — | — | — | — | | Wake Up, Sunshine |
| "Getaway Green" | 2020 | — | — | — | — | — | — | — | — | — | — | | Wake Up, Sunshine |
| "Monsters" (featuring Blackbear or Blackbear and Demi Lovato) | 2020 | 55 | 6 | — (Note: "Monsters" did not enter the Australian ARIA Singles Chart but peaked at number 49 on the ARIA Digital Songs Chart.) | — | 33 | 2 | 27 | — | — | — (Note: "Monsters" did not enter the UK Singles Chart, but peaked at number 97 on the UK Singles Downloads Chart.) | RIAA: Gold; ARIA: Platinum; BPI: Silver; MC: Platinum; RMNZ: Gold | Wake Up, Sunshine |
| "Once in a Lifetime" | 2021 | — | 40 | — | — | 44 | — | — | — | × | — (Note: "Once in a Lifetime" did not enter the UK Singles Chart, but peaked at number 67 on the UK Singles Sales Chart.) | | Non-album singles |
| "PMA" (featuring Pale Waves) | 2021 | — | — (Note: "PMA" did not enter the Hot Rock & Alternative Songs chart, but peaked at number 22 on the Alternative Digital Song Sales chart.) | — | — | — | — | — | — | × | — (Note: "PMA" did not enter the UK Singles Chart, but peaked at number 78 on the UK Singles Sales Chart.) | | Non-album singles |
| "Ghost Story" (with Cheat Codes) | 2021 | — | — | — | — | — | — | — | — | × | — | | Hellraisers, Pt. 2 |
| "Sleepwalking" | 2022 | — | 45 | — | — | — | — | — | — | × | — | | Tell Me I'm Alive |
| "Tell Me I'm Alive" | 2023 | — | — | — | — | — | 60 | — | — | × | — | | Tell Me I'm Alive |
| "Modern Love" | 2023 | — | — | — | — | — | — | — | — | × | — | | Tell Me I'm Alive |
| "Calm Down" | 2023 | — | — (Note: "Calm Down" did not enter the Hot Rock & Alternative Songs chart, but peaked at number 28 on the Rock & Alternative Airplay chart.) | — | — | — | 25 | — | — | × | — | | Tell Me I'm Alive |
| "Fake as Hell" (with Avril Lavigne) | 2023 | — | — (Note: "Fake as Hell" did not enter the Hot Rock & Alternative Songs chart, but peaked at number 10 on the Rock Digital Song Sales chart.) | — (Note: "Fake as Hell" did not enter the Australian ARIA Singles Chart but peaked at number 44 on the ARIA Digital Songs Chart.) | 183 | — | — | — | — | × | — (Note: "Fake as Hell" did not enter the UK Singles Chart, but peaked at number 78 on the UK Singles Sales Chart.) | | Non-album singles |
| "Hate This Song" (with I Prevail) | 2024 | — | — | — | — | — | — | — | — | × | — | | True Power (Expanded) |
| "Suckerpunch" | 2025 | — | — | — | — | — | 12 | — | — | × | — | | Everyone’s Talking! |
| "The Weather" | 2025 | — | — (Note: "The Weather" did not enter the Hot Rock & Alternative Songs chart, but peaked at number 10 on the Rock & Alternative Airplay chart.) | — | — | 39 | — | — | — | × | — | | Everyone’s Talking! |
| "Oh No!" | 2025 | — | — | — | — | — | — | — | — | × | — | | Everyone’s Talking! |
| "Butterflies" | 2025 | — | — | — | — | — | — | — | — | × | — | | Everyone’s Talking! |
| "Sugar" (featuring JoJo) | 2025 | — | — | — | — | — | — | — | — | × | — | | Everyone’s Talking! |
"—" denotes a recording that did not chart or was not released in that territory. "×" denotes periods where charts did not exist or were not archived.

=== Promotional singles ===
List of promotional singles, with selected chart positions, showing year released and album name
| Title | Year | Peak chart positions | | | | | Album |
| Title | Year | US Bub. | US Rock DL | CZ Rock | HUN Air. | UK Indie | Album |
|---|---|---|---|---|---|---|---|
| "Coffee Shop Soundtrack" | 2006 | — | — | — | — | — | Put Up or Shut Up |
| "Six Feet Under the Stars" | 2007 | — | — | — | — | — | So Wrong, It's Right |
| "Umbrella" | 2009 | — | — | — | 9 | — | Punk Goes Crunk |
| "Toxic Valentine" | 2009 | — | — | — | — | — | Jennifer's Body |
| "Painting Flowers" | 2011 | 5 | 13 | — | — | 24 | Almost Alice |
| "The Reckless and the Brave" | 2012 | — | — | — | — | — | Don't Panic |
| "Good Times" (orchestral arrangement) | 2017 | — | — | — | — | — | Non-album single |
| "Melancholy Kaleidoscope" | 2020 | — | — | 16 | — | — | Wake Up, Sunshine |
| "Trouble Is" | 2020 | — | — | — | — | — | Wake Up, Sunshine |
| "Wake Up, Sunshine" | 2020 | — | — | — | — | — | Wake Up, Sunshine |
"—" denotes a recording that did not chart or was not released in that territory.

=== As featured artist ===
List of singles as featured artist, showing year released and album name
| Title | Year | Peak chart positions | Album |
| Title | Year | UK Sales | Album |
|---|---|---|---|
| "Crashed the Wedding 2.0" (Busted featuring All Time Low) | 2023 | 57 | Non-album single |

== Other charted and certified songs ==
List of songs, with selected chart positions, showing year released, album name and certifications
| Title | Year | Peak chart positions | | | | Certifications | Album |
| Title | Year | US Holi. DL | US Rock DL | CZ | UK Rock | Certifications | Album |
|---|---|---|---|---|---|---|---|
| "Remembering Sunday" (featuring Juliet Simms) | 2007 | — | — | — | — | RIAA: Gold | So Wrong, It's Right |
| "Me Without You (All I Ever Wanted)" | 2013 | — | — | — | 17 | | Don't Panic: It's Longer Now! |
| "Canals" | 2013 | — | — | — | 19 | | Don't Panic: It's Longer Now! |
| "Oh, Calamity!" | 2013 | — | — | — | 22 | | Don't Panic: It's Longer Now! |
| "Fool's Holiday" | 2013 | 14 | — | — | — | | Punk Goes Christmas |
| "Take Cover" | 2016 | — | 39 | — | — | | Straight to DVD II: Past, Present and Future Hearts |
| "Falling for Strangers" | 2025 | — | — | 16 | — | | Everyone's Talking! |
"—" denotes a recording that did not chart or was not released in that territory.

== Music videos ==
| Year | Title | Director |
|---|---|---|
| 2005 | "Circles" | Matt Grube |
| 2006 | "The Girl's a Straight-Up Hustler" | |
| 2006 | "Coffee Shop Soundtrack" | Jesse Burton |
| 2007 | "Six Feet Under the Stars" | |
| 2008 | "Dear Maria, Count Me In" | Travis Kopach |
| 2008 | "Poppin' Champagne'" | Travis Kopach |
| 2009 | "Weightless" | Matthew Stawski |
| 2009 | "Damned If I Do Ya (Damned If I Don't)" | Matthew Stawski |
| 2010 | "Lost in Stereo" | |
| 2011 | "I Feel Like Dancin'" | Matthew Stawski |
| 2011 | "Forget About It" | Jonathan Bregel |
| 2011 | "Time-Bomb" | Asher Levin |
| 2011 | "Merry Christmas, Kiss My Ass" | Jon Danovic |
| 2012 | "For Baltimore" | Brett Jubinville |
| 2013 | "Somewhere in Neverland" | Raul Gonzo |
| 2013 | "Backseat Serenade" | Jeremy Rall |
| 2013 | "A Love Like War" (featuring Vic Fuentes) | Drew Russ |
| 2014 | "The Irony of Choking on a Lifesaver" | |
| 2015 | "Something's Gotta Give" | Chris Marrs Piliero |
| 2015 | "Kids in the Dark" | Sitcom Soldiers |
| 2015 | "Runaways" | |
| 2016 | "Missing You" | Patrick Tracy |
| 2016 | "Take Cover" | Rafa Alcantara |
| 2017 | "Dirty Laundry" | PTracy |
| 2017 | "Last Young Renegade" | PTracy |
| 2017 | "Life of the Party" | PTracy |
| 2017 | "Nice2KnoU" | PTracy |
| 2017 | "Good Times" | PTracy |
| 2018 | "Drugs and Candy" (live) | |
| 2018 | "Afterglow" | Joshua Halling |
| 2018 | "Birthday" | PTracy |
| 2020 | "Some Kind Of Disaster" | Lewis Cater |
| 2020 | "Sleeping In" | Max Moore |
| 2020 | "Getaway Green" | |
| 2020 | "Monsters (Acoustic)" | |
| 2021 | "Once In A Lifetime" | Max Moore |
| 2022 | "Sleepwalking" | Edoardo Ranaboldo |
| 2023 | "Tell Me I'm Alive" | Alex Gaskarth & DJay Brawner |
| 2023 | "Modern Love" | Guadalupe Bustos |
| 2023 | "Calm Down" | Alex Gaskarth & DJay Brawner |
| 2024 | "Dear Maria, Count Me In (ATL's Version)" | |
| 2024 | "Remembering Sunday (feat. Lindsey Stirling & Lisa Gaskarth) [ATL's Version]" | |
| 2025 | "Suckerpunch" "The Weather" "Butterflies" | Alex Gaskarth Nick Stafford Nick Stafford |

== Compilation appearances ==
| Year | Song contributed | Release title |
|---|---|---|
| 2006 | "Time to Break Up" (Blink-182 cover) | A Tribute to Blink 182: Pacific Ridge Records Heroes of Pop-Punk |
| 2007 | "Jasey Rae" (acoustic) | Punk Goes Acoustic 2 |
| 2007 | "Break Out! Break Out!" (acoustic) | Another Hopeless Summer 2007 |
| 2008 | "Dear Maria, Count Me In" (Connect Sets acoustic) | I'm So Hopeless, You're So Hopeless |
| 2008 | "Umbrella" (Rihanna cover) | Punk Goes Crunk |
| 2009 | "Toxic Valentine" | Jennifer's Body: Music from the Motion Picture |
| 2010 | "Painting Flowers" | Almost Alice |
| 2010 | "Alejandro" (Lady Gaga cover) | Radio 1's Live Lounge – Volume 5 |
| 2011 | "I Feel Like Dancin'" (acoustic) | Another Hopeless Summer 2011 |
| 2013 | "True Colors" (Cyndi Lauper cover) | Love Is Hopeless 2013 |
| 2013 | "Fool's Holiday" | Punk Goes Christmas |
| 2015 | "Something's Gotta Give" | NOW! That's What I call Music 55 |
| 2017 | "Longview" (Green Day cover) | Green Day: The Early Years |

== See also ==
- List of songs recorded by All Time Low
