= Fake as Hell =

2023 single by All Time Low and Avril Lavigne

Single by All Time Low and Avril Lavigne
- Released: September 14, 2023
- Genre: Pop-punk
- Length: 3:00
- Label: Fueled by Ramen
- Songwriters: Andrew Goldstein; Alex Gaskarth; Avril Lavigne; Jack Barakat; Zakk Cervini
- Producer: Zakk Cervini

All Time Low singles chronology
"Calm Down" (2023)	"Fake as Hell" (2023)	"Hate This Song" (2024)

Avril Lavigne singles chronology
"I'm a Mess" (2022)	"Fake as Hell" (2023)	"Can You Die from a Broken Heart" (2024)

Lyric video
- "Fake as Hell" on YouTube

"Fake as Hell" is a song by American band All Time Low and Canadian singer Avril Lavigne, released on September 14, 2023. The song was released as a standalone single following the band's 2023 album, Tell Me I'm Alive.

== Background ==
Prior to their collaboration, All Time Low and Avril Lavigne had already joined forces in 2022 when they performed a cover of Blink-182's "All the Small Things" during their set at the When We Were Young festival. The song was written by Andrew Goldstein, Alex Gaskarth, Avril Lavigne, Jack Barakat, and Zakk Cervini with Cervini also serving as the producer. It was released on September 14, 2023, on digital and streaming platforms through Fueled by Ramen.

== Composition and themes ==
"Fake as Hell" is a pop punk track that delves into the emotional landscape of a breakup and its aftermath. According to All Time Low's frontman, Alex Gaskarth, the song revolves around the theme of "recognizing what's real and saying goodbye to what's not". Gaskarth describes it as an anthem about cutting ties with people and things that hinder personal progress, symbolizing a departure from the past and a fresh perspective on the future. In his words, "It's a wave goodbye to whatever's in the rear-view mirror and a new perspective on the road ahead". The lyrics convey a symbolic departure from the past and an optimistic embrace of a new journey ahead.

== Critical reception ==
"Fake as Hell" was received positively upon release by critics; with Mary Varvaris of The Music describing the song as "a three-minute pop-punk anthem" about "recognizing what's real and saying goodbye to what's not". Alternative Press' Andrew Sacher praised the song, calling it an "aughts-era pop-punk sugar rush you'd expect from a collaboration like this one". Cillea Houghton of American Songwriter praised the artists' vocal performance in the song by calling them "strong voices that were made for each other, making for a natural collaboration".

In a review for The Eastern Echo, Kasper Mielke described the track as "the definition of pop punk", praising its catchy guitar-driven sound and the strong vocal contrast between Gaskarth and Lavigne, calling them "a match made in heaven", while also highlighting the effective simplicity of lyrics like "Feel like a kite in a hurricane, so cut the string and let me fly away", ultimately rating the song 8 out of 10.

== Live performances ==
The debut live performance of "Fake as Hell" took place on October 22, 2023, during All Time Low's set at the When We Were Young festival. The band showcased the song in a medley alongside Lavigne's "Sk8er Boi". All Time Low also opened for the first part of the North American leg of Lavigne's Greatest Hits Tour in May and June 2024, where the song was performed together during her set.

== Charts ==
Chart performance for "Fake as Hell"
Chart (2023)	Peak position
Australia Digital Tracks (ARIA)	44
Belarus Airplay (TopHit)	144
UK Singles Downloads (OCC)	50
UK Singles Sales (OCC)	52
UK Rock & Metal (OCC)	29
US Alternative Digital Song Sales (Billboard)	7
US Rock Digital Song Sales (Billboard)	10
