= Everyone's Talking! The World Tour =

2025–2026 concert tour by All Time Low

- World tour by All Time Low
- Promotional poster for the North American leg
- Location: Europe; North America; Oceania
- Associated album: Everyone's Talking!
- Start date: October 4, 2025
- End date: February 2, 2026
- Legs: 3
- No. of shows: 61
- Supporting acts: Taylor Acorn; The Cab; Four Year Strong; Friends of Friends; Mayday Parade; The Paradox
- Producer: Live Nation

All Time Low concert chronology
- Forever Tour (2024); Everyone's Talking! The World Tour (2025–2026)

Everyone's Talking! The World Tour is a concert tour by American rock band All Time Low in support of their tenth studio album, Everyone's Talking!. The North American leg was announced on June 16, 2025, and the European leg was announced on July 14, 2025.

== Tour dates ==
List of 2025 concerts, showing date, city, country, venue and opening act(s)
Date	City	Country	Venue	Opening act(s)
October 8	Fayetteville	United States	Ozark Music Hall	Mayday Parade; The Cab; The Paradox
October 9	Oklahoma City	United States	The Criterion	Mayday Parade; The Cab; The Paradox
October 11	Omaha	United States	Steelhouse	Mayday Parade; The Cab; The Paradox
October 12	Morrison (Note: Labeled as Denver on promotional material.)	United States	Red Rocks Amphitheatre	Mayday Parade; The Cab; The Paradox
October 16	Salt Lake City	United States	The Union	Mayday Parade; The Cab; The Paradox
October 18 (Note: The show on October 18 was part of When We Were Young festival 2025.)	Winchester (Note: Labeled as Las Vegas on promotional material.)	United States	Las Vegas Festival Grounds	—N/a
October 19 (Note: The show on October 19 was part of When We Were Young festival 2025.)	Winchester	United States	Las Vegas Festival Grounds	—N/a
October 21	San Jose	United States	Civic	Mayday Parade; The Cab; The Paradox
October 22	Inglewood	United States	YouTube Theater	Mayday Parade; The Cab; The Paradox
October 23	Phoenix	United States	Arizona Financial Theatre	Mayday Parade; The Cab; The Paradox
October 25	Dallas	United States	South Side Ballroom	Mayday Parade; The Cab; The Paradox
October 26	San Antonio	United States	Boeing Center at Tech Port	Mayday Parade; The Cab; The Paradox
October 28	Chesterfield (Note: Labeled as St. Louis on promotional material.)	United States	The Factory	Mayday Parade; The Cab; The Paradox
October 29	Waukee	United States	Vibrant Music Hall	Mayday Parade; The Cab; The Paradox
October 31	Madison	United States	The Sylvee	Mayday Parade; The Cab; The Paradox
November 1	Merrionette Park	United States	115 Bourbon Street	—N/a
November 2	Grand Rapids	United States	GLC Live at 20 Monroe	Mayday Parade; The Cab; The Paradox
November 3	Detroit	United States	The Fillmore	Mayday Parade; The Cab; The Paradox
November 5	Toronto	Canada	History	Mayday Parade; The Paradox
November 7	Columbus	United States	KEMBA Live!	Mayday Parade; Four Year Strong; The Paradox
November 8	Cincinnati	United States	Andrew J. Brady Music Center	Mayday Parade; Four Year Strong; The Paradox
November 11	Birmingham	United States	Avondale Brewing Company	Mayday Parade; Four Year Strong; The Paradox
November 12	Atlanta	United States	Coca-Cola Roxy	Mayday Parade; Four Year Strong; The Paradox
November 14	Fort Lauderdale	United States	War Memorial Auditorium	Mayday Parade; Four Year Strong; The Paradox
November 15	Clearwater	United States	The BayCare Sound	Mayday Parade; Four Year Strong; The Paradox
November 16 (Note: The show on November 16 was part of Warped Tour 2025.)	Orlando	United States	Tinker Field	—N/a
November 18	Virginia Beach	United States	The Dome	Mayday Parade; Four Year Strong; The Paradox
November 19	Moon (Note: Labeled as Coraopolis in promotional material)	United States	UPMC Events Center	Mayday Parade; Four Year Strong; The Paradox
November 21	Philadelphia	United States	Metropolitan Opera House	Mayday Parade; Four Year Strong; The Paradox
November 22	Boston	United States	MGM Music Hall at Fenway	Mayday Parade; Four Year Strong; The Paradox
November 23	Boston	United States	MGM Music Hall at Fenway	Mayday Parade; Four Year Strong; The Paradox
November 24	New York City	United States	Hammerstein Ballroom	Mayday Parade; Four Year Strong; The Paradox
November 25	New York City	United States	Hammerstein Ballroom	Mayday Parade; Four Year Strong; The Paradox
November 26	Washington, D.C.	United States	The Anthem	Mayday Parade; Four Year Strong; The Paradox
November 28	Buffalo	United States	RiverWorks	Mayday Parade; Four Year Strong; The Paradox
November 29	Wilkes-Barre	United States	Mohegan Sun Arena	Mayday Parade; Four Year Strong; The Paradox
December 5 (Note: The show on December 5 was part of Good Things festival 2025.)	Melbourne	Australia	Flemington Racecourse	—N/a
December 6 (Note: The show on December 6 was part of Good Things festival 2025.)	Sydney	Australia	Sydney Showground	—N/a
December 7 (Note: The show on December 7 was part of Good Things festival 2025.)	Brisbane	Australia	Brisbane Showgrounds	—N/a
December 9	Brisbane	Australia	The Tivoli	Friends of Friends
December 11	Adelaide	Australia	Hindley Street Music Hall	Friends of Friends

List of 2026 concerts, showing date, city, country, venue and opening act(s)
Date	City	Country	Venue	Opening act(s)
January 20	Glasgow	Scotland	OVO Hydro	Mayday Parade; Taylor Acorn
January 22	Cardiff	Wales	Utilita Arena	Mayday Parade; Taylor Acorn
January 23	Manchester	England	Co-op Live	Mayday Parade; Taylor Acorn
January 24	London	England	The O_{2} Arena	Mayday Parade; Taylor Acorn
January 26	Paris	France	Salle Pleyel	Mayday Parade; Taylor Acorn
January 27	Brussels	Belgium	Ancienne Belgique	Mayday Parade; Taylor Acorn
January 29	Tilburg	Netherlands	Poppodium 013	Mayday Parade; Taylor Acorn
January 30	Leipzig	Germany	Haus Auensee	Mayday Parade; Taylor Acorn
January 31	Hamburg	Germany	Alsterdorfer Sporthalle	Mayday Parade; Taylor Acorn
February 2	Stockholm	Sweden	Fryshuset Arena	Mayday Parade; Taylor Acorn
February 3	Oslo	Norway	Sentrum Scene	Mayday Parade; Taylor Acorn
February 4	Copenhagen	Denmark	Vega	Mayday Parade; Taylor Acorn
February 6	Cologne	Germany	Palladium	Mayday Parade; Taylor Acorn
February 8	Warsaw	Poland	Klub Stodoła	Mayday Parade; Taylor Acorn
February 9	Prague	Czech Republic	SaSaZu	Mayday Parade; Taylor Acorn
February 10	Zurich	Switzerland	X-TRA	Mayday Parade; Taylor Acorn
February 12	Munich	Germany	TonHalle	Mayday Parade; Taylor Acorn
February 13	Bergamo	Italy	ChorusLife Arena	Mayday Parade; Taylor Acorn
February 15	Barcelona	Spain	Razzmatazz	Mayday Parade; Taylor Acorn
February 16	Madrid	Spain	Sala La Riviera	Mayday Parade; Taylor Acorn
February 17	Lisbon	Portugal	Lisboa ao Vivo	Mayday Parade; Taylor Acorn

=== Cancelled shows ===
Date	City	Country	Venue	Reason
October 14	Seattle	United States	WaMu Theater	Health issues
