= All Time Low =

American rock band

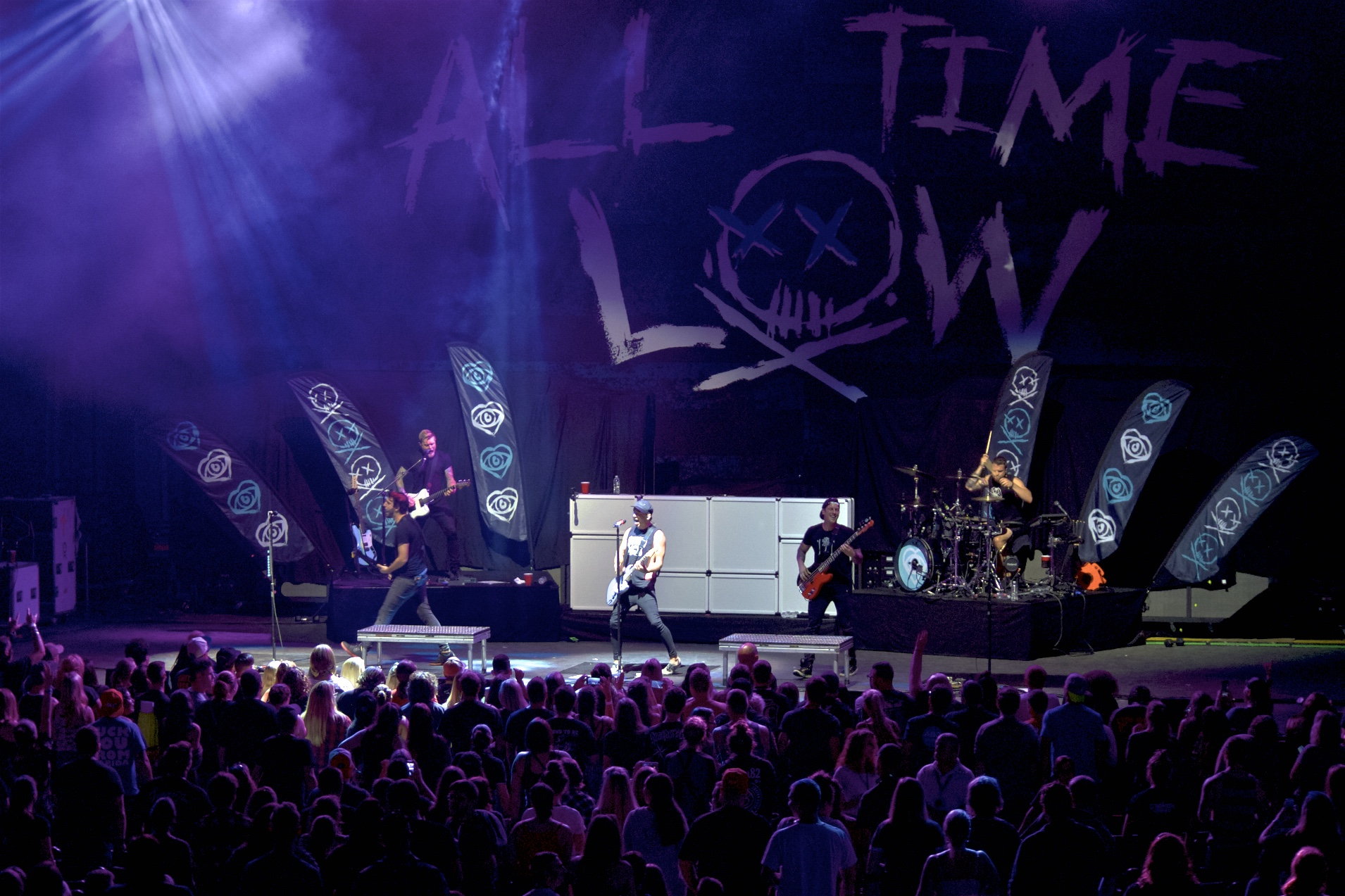
- All Time Low performing at the Saratoga Performing Arts Center in Saratoga Springs, New York, 2016.

Background information
- Also known as: ATL
- Origin: Towson, Maryland, U.S.
- Genres: Pop-punk; pop rock; power pop; emo pop; alternative rock
- Years active: 2003–present
- Labels: Emerald Moon; Hopeless; Interscope; Fueled by Ramen
- Spinoffs: Simple Creatures
- Members: Rian Dawson; Alex Gaskarth; Jack Barakat; Zack Merrick
- Past members: Chris Cortilello; TJ Ihle
- Website: www.alltimelow.com

All Time Low is an American rock band formed in Towson, Maryland, in 2003. Consisting of lead vocalist and rhythm guitarist Alex Gaskarth, lead guitarist Jack Barakat, bassist/backing vocalist Zack Merrick, and drummer Rian Dawson, the band took its name from lyrics in the song "Head on Collision" by New Found Glory. The band has consistently done year-long tours, headlined numerous tours, and has appeared at music festivals including Warped Tour, Reading and Leeds, and Soundwave.

Beginning as a band in high school, All Time Low released their debut EP, The Three Words to Remember in Dealing with the End EP, in 2004 through local label Emerald Moon. Since then, the band has released nine studio albums: The Party Scene (2005), So Wrong, It's Right (2007), Nothing Personal (2009), Dirty Work (2011), Don't Panic (2012), Future Hearts (2015), Last Young Renegade (2017), Wake Up, Sunshine (2020), Tell Me I'm Alive (2023), and Everyone's Talking! (2025). They released their first live album, Straight to DVD, in 2010, and released their second live album, Straight to DVD II: Past, Present and Future Hearts, on September 9, 2016.

== History ==
=== 2003–2006: Formation and The Party Scene ===
Formed while still in high school in 2003, All Time Low began covering songs by pop-punk bands such as Blink-182. The band's line-up included Alex Gaskarth on vocals, Jack Barakat on guitar, TJ Ihle on lead guitar and backing vocals, Chris Cortilello on bass, and Rian Dawson on drums. Cortilello and Ihle left the band, resulting in the band lying dormant until Zack Merrick joined on bass and Gaskarth picked up guitar. They released a four-song EP in November before signing to Emerald Moon Records in 2004. They released their second EP, titled The Three Words to Remember in Dealing with the End EP later that same year. The band released their debut studio album, The Party Scene, in July 2005.

In December, it was announced that the band was no longer signed, but were attracting attention from a number of record labels. In late 2006, the band performed a showcase for John Janick, the founder of record label Fueled by Ramen. They were not signed because Cute Is What We Aim For had recently been taken on by the label, which was not in a position to sign another band at the time. The band was brought to the attention of Hopeless Records by fellow touring band Amber Pacific; on March 28, 2006, it was announced that All Time Low had signed with Hopeless. The band said in an interview that they were starting to get serious about music while in their senior year of high school; following their graduation, the members focused on the group full-time, and released the Put Up or Shut Up EP in July. The EP entered the Independent Albums chart at No. 20 and the Top Heatseekers at No. 12.

All Time Low began a busy tour in support of the EP in late 2006. After the tour, the band began writing material for their second studio album.

=== 2007–2008: So Wrong, It's Right ===
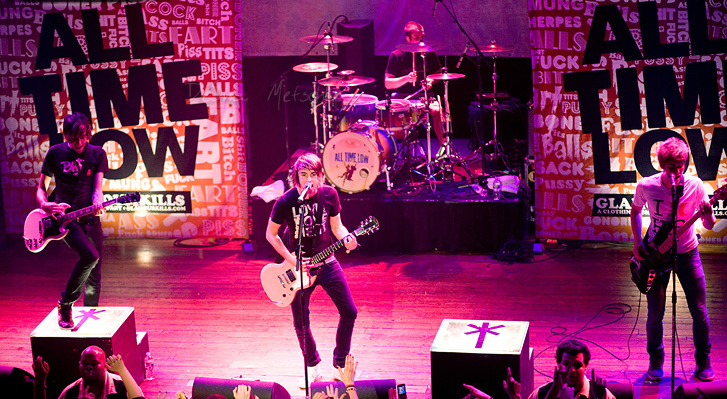
All Time Low on the AP Tour, at the House of Blues in Chicago, 2008

In the summer of 2007, All Time Low played the Vans Warped Tour on the Smartpunk Stage. They made their live debut in the UK in late 2007 supporting Plain White T's. All Time Low released their second studio album So Wrong, It's Right in September 2007. It peaked at No. 62 on the Billboard 200 and No. 6 on the Independent Albums chart. The second single from the album, "Dear Maria, Count Me In", which was written about a stripper, became the band's first single to reach the charts and peaked at No. 86 on the Pop 100. In 2011, the single was certified Gold for 500,000 shipments.

In early 2008 the band completed their first headlining tour, the Manwhores and Open Sores Tour with opening acts Every Avenue, Mayday Parade, and Just Surrender.

Following the release of So Wrong, It's Right, All Time Low quickly gained popularity, eventually making their TRL debut on February 12, 2008. They have also been featured on MTV's Discover and Download and Music Choice's Fresh Crops, and have been added to both MTV's Big Ten and MTV Hits playlists. On March 7, 2008, the band made their live television debut on Jimmy Kimmel Live! and then performed live at the mtvU Woodie Awards.

From March 2008 to May 2008, they co-headlined the AP Tour 2008 with The Rocket Summer; supported by acts such as The Matches, Sonny Moore, and Forever the Sickest Kids. In May 2008 they played at the Give It a Name Festival. Also in May 2008, they co-headlined a UK tour with Cobra Starship. In July 2008, the band headlined the Shortest Tour Ever with supporting acts Hit the Lights, Valencia, and There for Tomorrow. From mid-July to mid-August they played the 2008 Vans Warped Tour. They ended 2008 with their headlining tour, The Compromising of Integrity, Morality and Principles in Exchange for Money Tour with Mayday Parade, The Maine, and Every Avenue.

In December 2008, All Time Low was named "Band of the Year" by Alternative Press magazine and featured on the cover of their January 2009 issue.

=== 2009–2010: Nothing Personal ===
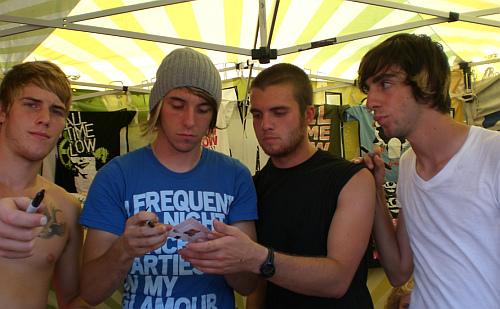
All Time Low in 2010 (left to right: Zach Merrick, Alex Gaskarth, Rian Dawson, and Jack Barakat)

In early 2009, All Time Low confirmed in an interview with UK magazine Rock Sound that they had begun writing new material for a third studio album and revealed they had collaborated with artists and producers to help co-write a number of songs.

Although still in the writing process, All Time Low began recording for their new album in January 2009, they finished recording only a month later. The album's lead single "Weightless" was released in March 2009 and became the band's first song to achieve some radio play worldwide. The song was included during the band's appearance at major concert venues, such as Bambooozle in May 2009, to promote the new album.

All Time Low released their third studio album Nothing Personal in July 2009. Before its official release, the full album was made available for streaming download one week earlier through MTV's The Leak.

Billboard magazine predicted that the album "looked like it could" enter the top ten of the Billboard 200 in its debut week, with anywhere between 60,000 and 75,000 sales. Nothing Personal debuted at No. 4 on the Billboard chart and sold 63,000 copies, making it the band's highest charting album to date

They played Fall Out Boy's Believers Never Die Tour Part Deux Tour in spring 2009, with Metro Station, Cobra Starship, and Hey Monday. All Time Low also announced tours in both Australia and Japan in June 2009 with Set Your Goals. The band also did a ten date tour with We the Kings, Cartel and Days Difference. They headlined Warped Tour 2009 from July 19 through the end of the tour, and then played at Voodoo Experience 2009, which was headlined by Eminem, Kiss and the Flaming Lips. All Time Low completed a European tour in the Fall of 2009, with support from the Audition and the Friday Night Boys. All Time Low also headlined the first The Glamour Kills Tour with We the Kings, Hey Monday, and the Friday Night Boys. It began October 15, 2009, and ran through December 6, 2009.

All Time Low announced in November 2009 that they had been signed to major label Interscope Records. One month later, the band won the "Best Pop Punk Band" at the Top In Rock Awards.

In May 2010, All Time Low released their first live album, entitled Straight to DVD. The CD/DVD was a recording of a show in New York. All Time Low returned to Ireland & The UK in January and February 2010 as they headlined the Kerrang! Relentless Tour 2010 with The Blackout, My Passion and Young Guns. They played a few mainland Europe shows immediately afterward, mostly in countries they had never been before. All Time Low returned to Australia in February and March to play at Soundwave festival. All Time Low co-headlined The Bamboozle Roadshow 2010 between May and June, with Boys Like Girls, Third Eye Blind, and LMFAO, along with numerous supporting bands including Good Charlotte, Forever the Sickest Kids, Cartel, and Simple Plan. All Time Low played the Reading and Leeds Festival 2010 in the UK over the August Bank Holiday. All Time Low headlined the My Small Package Tour in fall 2010, with supporting acts A Rocket to the Moon and City (Comma) State. Halfway during the tour, Before You Exit became a supporting act. On October 24, Storm the Beaches opened on the Baltimore date of the tour.

On March 15, 2010, All Time Low released the song "Painting Flowers" for the album Almost Alice, the soundtrack for the fantasy-adventure film Alice in Wonderland. They then began writing for their fourth studio album, which would also be their major label debut.

=== 2011–2013: Dirty Work and Don't Panic ===
Demos for the band's album leaked to the web in August 2010. The band later confirmed in an interview which tracks would be on the upcoming album. All Time Low released their fourth studio album almost a year later, titled Dirty Work, in June 2011, after being pushed back from a March release date. The album is currently All Time Low's highest-selling album to date overseas. It earned the album a peak position of No. 13 in Australia and Canada and No. 20 in the UK.

In spring of 2011, All Time Low embarked on the Dirty Work Tour even though the album was not yet released, supported by Yellowcard, Hey Monday, and The Summer Set. They were joined by Yellowcard and Young Guns on their UK tour shortly after. All Time Low concluded their summer 2011 tour, "Gimme Summer Ya Love Tour", with opening acts Mayday Parade, We Are The In Crowd, The Starting Line, Brighter, and The Cab. In September 2011, the band was scheduled to play at Soundwave Revolution in Australia, but the festival was cancelled. All Time Low co-headlined a mini-festival tour, Counter Revolution, in its place. The band finished their fall 2011 tour, "The Rise and Fall Of My Pants Tour" with The Ready Set, He Is We, and Paradise Fears. In Canada, the group toured with Simple Plan, Marianas Trench, and These Kids Wear Crowns.

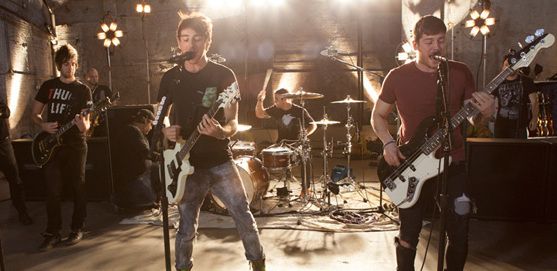
All Time Low performing in 2012

The band returned to the UK on January 12, 2012. supported by The Maine and We Are The In Crowd and toured until February 4. Several of these dates sold out, so more dates were added. All Time Low also played the Warped Tour (June–August 2012) and the Reading and Leeds Festival (August 2012).

In May 2012, All Time Low left their label Interscope Records and released a new song titled "The Reckless and the Brave" on June 1 via their website as a free download. The band announced that they had been working on a new studio album, due for release sometime in 2012. On July 3, All Time Low announced that they had signed to Hopeless Records again and that the new album would be released in the second half of 2012. On August 10 they announced that their new album, titled Don't Panic would be released October 9 through Hopeless Records. On August 24, a new song titled "For Baltimore" was released through Alternative Press. "Somewhere in Neverland" was released next, peaking in the top 50 on the US iTunes charts.

After the completion of the 2012 Warped Tour, the band announced a "Rockshow at the End of the World" headlining tour with The Summer Set, The Downtown Fiction and Hit The Lights. They headlined in Dublin, Ireland on August 20, Aberdeen, Scotland on August 22 and in Edinburgh, Scotland on August 23, 2012. They then played a series of shows around Europe including supporting Green Day in Germany. All Time Low were announced on Soundwave's 2013 lineup for Australia.

On September 27, All Time Low released the song "Outlines", featuring Jason Vena from the band Acceptance via MTV. On October 2, a week before its release, Hopeless Records' YouTube channel posted the entire Don't Panic album as a stream, with lyrics for all the songs.

In September 2013, the band re-released their album as Don't Panic: It's Longer Now!. It featured four newly recorded songs and four additional acoustic remixes as well as the original material. The lead single, A Love Like War featuring Vic Fuentes of Pierce the Veil was released on September 2. Starting on September 23, All Time Low toured with Pierce the Veil as a supporting act of A Day To Remember's House Party Tour.

=== 2014–2016: Future Hearts ===
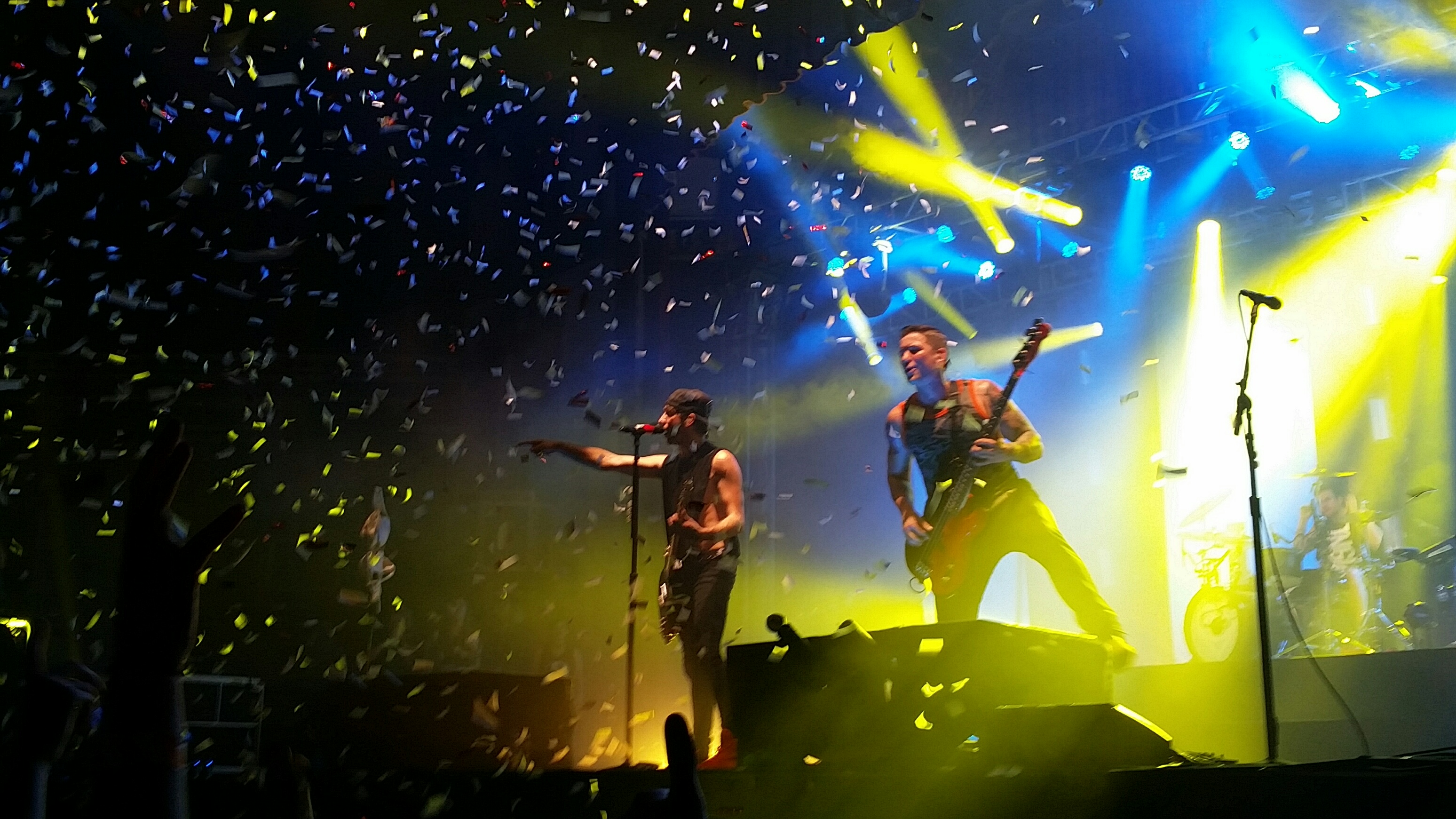
All Time Low, O2 Arena, London, 2016

On March 8, 2014, All Time Low toured the UK as part of their "A Love Like War: UK Tour" before moving on to the states on March 28 for the remaining part of the tour. The music video for their song "The Irony of Choking on a Lifesaver" used clips from that tour and premiered on Kerrang! on May 14.

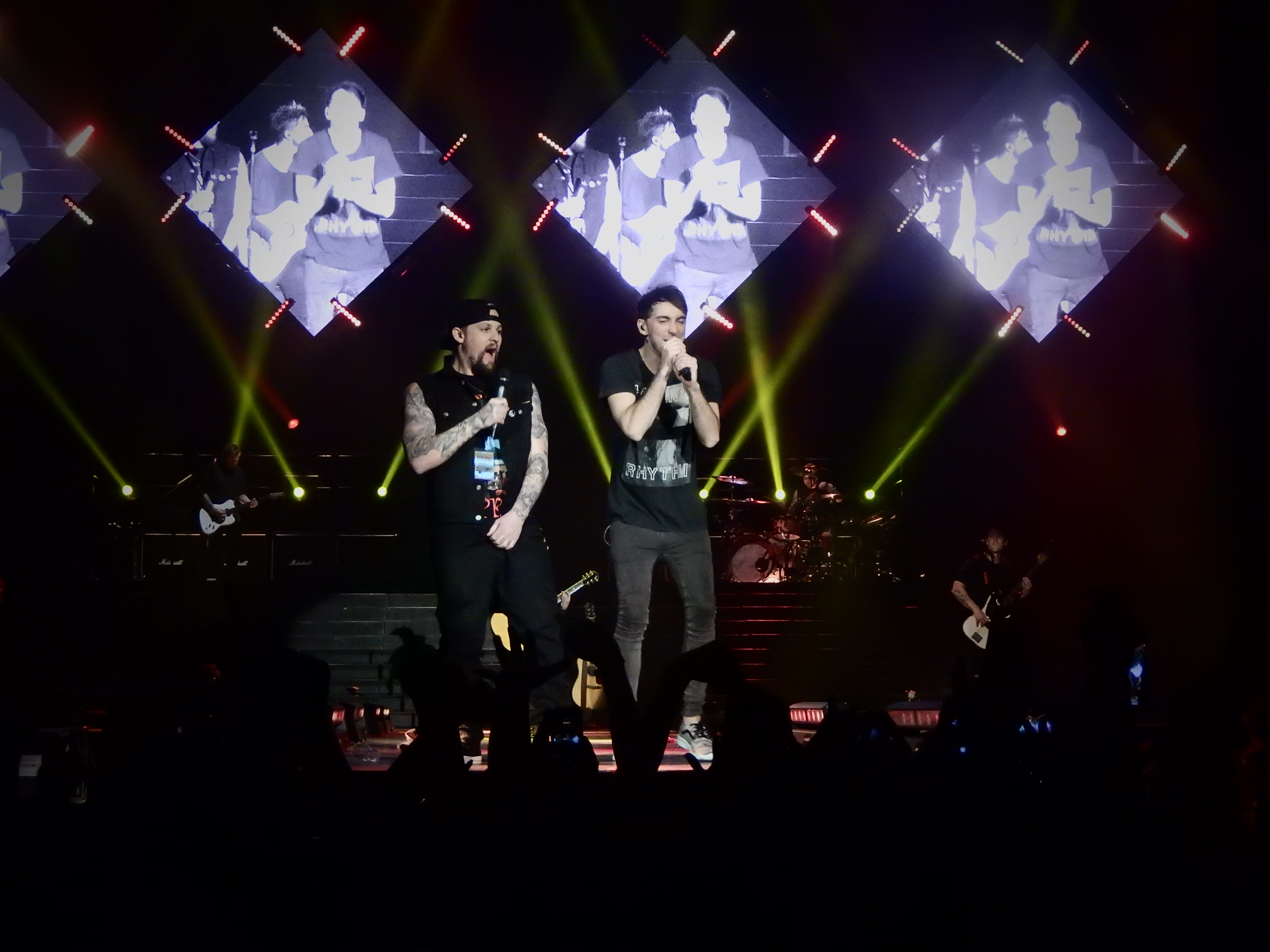
All Time Low, O2 Arena, London, 2016

Their next album would be recorded with producer John Feldman. The album, Future Hearts, was announced with the first single, "Something's Gotta Give", premiering on Radio One on January 11, 2015. The second single, "Kids In The Dark", was released on March 9, 2015. The band played Soundwave 2015 in Australia and headlined sideshows. They headlined a spring US 2015 tour for the album with support from Issues, Tonight Alive and State Champs, and co-headlining a UK tour with You Me At Six. Future Hearts debuted at No. 2 on the Billboard 200, selling 75,000 copies in its first week, becoming the band's highest charting and biggest selling week ever. It also topped the UK Albums Chart with almost 20,000 first week sales.

In July 2015, the band won four awards at the 2015 Alternative Press Music Awards.

The band has since toured and released music videos, including one for "Runaways" in August 2015. On September 1, 2016, the band leaked a new song titled "Take Cover", which was later officially released with a music video the next day as a bonus track for their live album, "Straight to DVD II: Past, Present, and Future Hearts". Members of the band also appeared for surprise DJ sets at Emo Nite in Los Angeles in 2015.

=== 2017–2019: Last Young Renegade ===
In mid-February 2017, the band announced a new song to be premiered on BBC Radio 1 Breakfast Show with Nick Grimshaw, called "Dirty Laundry". The music video was directed by Pat Tracy, who had also directed the music video for "Missing You". This was the first release after changing record labels from Hopeless Records to Fueled by Ramen. Both songs are singles from their album, Last Young Renegade, which was released on June 2, 2017. The band also released their cover of "Longview" by Green Day for the documentary "Green Day: The Early Years". On March 1, 2018, it was announced All Time Low would play three dates of the 2018 Vans Warped Tour. On June 12, 2018, the band released a song called "Everything Is Fine." The song's teasing featured the band members posting the song's title to social media repeatedly a day before it was released. On June 29, 2018, the band released a song called "Birthday." A live-in-the-studio re-recording of Nothing Personal was released on November 8, 2019.

On 29 May 2019, All Time Low performed at Australian band 5 Seconds of Summer's Friends of Friends sold-out benefit concert, held in Venice, California. All proceeds from the event were donated to the Safe Place for Youth project, a housing and support service for homeless youth in Los Angeles.

=== 2020–2022: Wake Up, Sunshine and online allegations ===
On January 1, 2020, the band released a video indicating the Last Young Renegade era had come to an end with a person in a panda suit burning their renegade jerseys, hinting their new album was coming.

Later that same month on January 21, 2020, the band released the song "Some Kind of Disaster".

On February 17, 2020, the band announced their new album, titled Wake Up, Sunshine, and would be released on April 3, 2020. The album featured 15 tracks and collaborations with rapper Blackbear and The Band Camino.

A remix of "Monsters" by Prblm Chld was released on November 13, 2020.

On December 4, 2020, the band's song "Monsters" was re-released, featuring vocals from singer Demi Lovato.

Between March 2021 and June 2022, the band released a series of stand-alone singles, beginning on March 24, 2021, with the single "Once In a Lifetime". On June 4, 2021, the band released a remix of the track "Palm Reader" by Dreamers, Big Boi, and Upsahl. On July 30, 2021, the band released a single "PMA" featuring Pale Waves. On September 10, 2021, the band released the song "Ghost Story", a collaboration with electronic music trio Cheat Codes. On June 6, 2022, the band released a pop-punk cover of "Blinding Lights" by The Weeknd.

In early October 2021, a TikTok video surfaced that accused an unnamed pop-punk band of inviting a 13-year-old onto its tour bus, claiming in the comments section that they "tried to take my bra off" with additional indications that it was All Time Low. A Twitter thread was later released anonymously detailing allegations against Jack Barakat. The band released a statement calling the allegations "completely and utterly false" and said they would pursue legal action. Meet Me at the Altar and Nothing,Nowhere dropped out of the band's Autumn tour and announced joint dates for shows in the wake of the allegations. The band sued three anonymous accounts for libel in February 2022, claiming they were "the victims of defamatory social media posts falsely and maliciously accusing them of sexual abuse and knowingly enabling such illegal conduct." In November 2024, the band dropped their suit, with their lawyer claiming that after a lengthy probe involving subpoenas and court orders, the defendant appeared to be multiple people who "spun an elaborate, fabricated story".

On October 7, 2022, the band released a new single, "Sleepwalking", accompanied by a music video. On December 21, 2022, they released two reimagined versions: an acoustic version and a remix by Mokita and Goldhouse.

=== 2023–2025: Tell Me I'm Alive ===
On January 13, 2023, the band announced their ninth studio album, Tell Me I'm Alive, which was released on March 17. The title track was released as a single along with a music video for the track the same day as the announcement.

On June 23, 2023, Busted released "Crashed the Wedding 2.0" featuring Alex on guest vocals for their 20th anniversary celebration.

A collaboration between the band and Canadian singer Avril Lavigne, "Fake as Hell" was released on September 15, 2023.

On September 17, 2024, the band released a collaboration single with I Prevail called "Hate This Song".

=== 2025–present: Everyone's Talking! ===
On June 13, 2025, the band released a new single titled "Suckerpunch". On July 11, 2025, the band announced their upcoming tenth studio album, Everyone's Talking!, set to be released on October 17. Along with the announcement, the album's second single, "The Weather", was released.

The band was confirmed to be performing at the 2026 Sonic Temple music festival in Columbus, Ohio in May of 2026. They are also confirmed to be performing at the Hellfest music festival being held in Clisson in June 2026.

== Musical style and legacy ==
All Time Low's musical style has generally been described as pop-punk, pop rock, power pop, emo pop, emo, and alternative rock. All Time Low cites bands such as Blink-182, Green Day, MxPx, New Found Glory, Saves the Day, and The Get Up Kids as influences.

The staff of Consequence ranked the band at number 63 on their list of "The 100 Best Pop Punk Bands" in 2019."

== Band members ==
Current

- Alex Gaskarth – lead vocals, rhythm guitar (2003–present)
- Jack Barakat – lead guitar, backing vocals (2003–present)
- Rian Dawson – drums, percussion (2003–present)
- Zack Merrick – bass guitar, backing vocals (2003–present)

Former

- Chris Cortilello – bass guitar (2003)
- TJ Ihle – lead guitar, backing vocals (2003)

Touring

- Dan Swank – rhythm guitar, keyboards, backing vocals, percussion (2020–present)
- Bryan Donahue – rhythm guitar, backing vocals (2013–2020)
- Matt Colussy – rhythm guitar (2011–2013)
- Matt Flyzik – backing vocals (2006–2013)

== Discography ==
Studio albums

- The Party Scene (2005)
- So Wrong, It's Right (2007)
- Nothing Personal (2009)
- Dirty Work (2011)
- Don't Panic (2012)
- Future Hearts (2015)
- Last Young Renegade (2017)
- Wake Up, Sunshine (2020)
- Tell Me I'm Alive (2023)
- Everyone's Talking! (2025)

== Filmography ==
Concert films

- Tell Me I'm Alive (2023) - Recorded at OVO Arena Wembley on the release date of their 9th album Tell Me I'm Alive, the 2 hour long show was broadcast live by On Air.

== Tours ==
=== Headlining ===
- Manwhores and Open Sores Tour (2008)
- AP Tour 2008 (2008)
- Shortest Tour Ever (2008)
- The Compromising of Integrity, Morality and Principles in Exchange for Money Tour (2008)
- The Glamour Kills Tour (2009)
- A Love Like War (2014)
- The Sound of Letting Go on Tour (2023)
- Forever Tour (2024)
- Everyone's Talking! The World Tour (2025-2026)

=== Opening acts ===
- Fall Out Boy – Believers Never Die Tour Part Deux Tour (2009)

== Awards and nominations ==
Year	Association	Category	Result
2008	Kerrang! Awards	Best Newcomer – All Time Low or Escape the Fate	Nominated
2010	Alternative Press Music Awards	Album of the Year – Dirty Work	Won
2015	Alternative Press Music Awards	Artist of the Year	Nominated
2015	Alternative Press Music Awards	Most Dedicated Fans	Nominated
2018	Rock Sound Awards	Album of the Year – Last Young Renegade	Won
2021	iHeartRadio Music Awards	Alternative Rock Artist of the Year	Nominated
2021	iHeartRadio Music Awards	Alternative Rock Song of the Year – Monsters (featuring blackbear)	Nominated
2022	iHeartRadio Music Awards	Alternative Rock Song of the Year – Monsters (featuring blackbear)	Won
