= Straight to DVD II: Past, Present and Future Hearts =

Live album by All Time Low
- Released: September 9, 2016
- Venue: Wembley Arena
- Genre: Alternative rock; pop punk; pop rock; power pop
- Length: 75:54
- Language: English
- Label: Hopeless Records

All Time Low chronology
Future Hearts (2015)	Straight to DVD II: Past, Present and Future Hearts (2016)	Last Young Renegade (2017)

Straight to DVD II: Past, Present and Future Hearts is the second live album by American rock band All Time Low, after the first Straight to DVD in 2010. It was released on September 9, 2016, and the footage was recorded at Wembley Arena.

== Track listing ==
No.	Title	Length
1.	"Intro (Live)"	1:34
2.	"A Love Like War (Live)"	3:38
3.	"Lost in Stereo (Live)"	3:39
4.	"Heroes (Live)"	3:52
5.	"Somewhere in Neverland (Live)"	4:00
6.	"The Irony of Choking on a Lifesaver (Live)"	4:25
7.	"Weightless (Live)"	3:52
8.	"Remembering Sunday (featuring Cassadee Pope) [Live]"	5:01
9.	"Therapy (Live)"	4:16
10.	"Kids in the Dark (Live)"	3:41
11.	"Guts (Live)"	3:22
12.	"Outlines (featuring Josh Franceschi) [Live]"	3:40
13.	"Damned if I Do Ya (Damned if I Don't) [Live]"	3:10
14.	"Forget About It (Live)"	2:56
15.	"Backseat Serenade (Live)"	5:11
16.	"Time Bomb (Live)"	4:04
17.	"Something's Gotta Give (Live)"	3:18
18.	"The Reckless and the Brave (Live)"	3:20
19.	"Dear Maria, Count Me In (Live)"	5:05
20.	"Take Cover"	3:30
21.	"Caroline (B-Side)"	3:05

== Personnel ==
All Time Low

- Jack Barakat - lead guitar, backing vocals
- Alex Gaskarth - rhythm guitar, vocals
- Rian Dawson - drums
- Zack Merrick - bass, backing vocals

Additional musicians

- Bryan Donahue - auxiliary guitar, backing vocals

Live crew

- Brian Southall - tour management
- Steve Hussein - tour management (assistant)
- Daniel Nickleski - production management, monitor engineer
- Phil Gornell - front of house engineer
- Jeff Maker - lighting designer
- Kyle Arndt - guitar technician
- Alan Fraser - guitar technician
- Alex Grieco - drum technician
- Adam Elmakias - photographer
