= Straight to DVD (album) =

2010 live album by All Time Low

Live album / video by All Time Low
- Released: May 25, 2010
- Recorded: December 4, 2009
- Venue: Hammerstein Ballroom, New York City, New York
- Genre: Alternative rock; pop punk
- Length: 1:09:32
- Label: Hopeless

All Time Low chronology
Nothing Personal (2009)	Straight to DVD (2010)	Dirty Work (2011)

Straight to DVD is the first live album by American rock band All Time Low. It was released on May 25, 2010. The footage was recorded at Hammerstein Ballroom in New York. The band has released a sequel titled Straight to DVD II: Past, Present and Future Hearts in 2016.

== Track listing ==
CD
No.	Title	Length
1.	"Intro"	1:29
2.	"Lost in Stereo"	3:29
3.	"Stella"	2:58
4.	"Break Your Little Heart"	4:38
5.	"Six Feet Under the Stars"	4:13
6.	"A Party Song (The Walk of Shame)"	4:14
7.	"Jasey Rae"	4:03
8.	"Poppin' Champagne"	4:55
9.	"Remembering Sunday" (with Juliet Simms of Automatic Loveletter)	5:09
10.	"Therapy"	6:01
11.	"Coffee Shop Soundtrack" (with Travis Clark of We the Kings)	5:56
12.	"Weightless"	4:06
13.	"Too Much"	7:19
14.	"Damned If I Do Ya (Damned If I Don't)"	4:16
15.	"Dear Maria, Count Me In"	6:46
Total length:		1:09:32

=== Standard Edition Includes ===
- 1 CD containing the full audio of the NYC show
- 1 DVD containing a blend of Documentary and Live NYC show, the Full Live Show Video, Outtakes
- The names of the All Time Low fan club ("Hustler Club") members printed in the booklet (Members before March 2010)

== Guest appearances ==
- Travis Clark
- Juliet Simms
- Andrew Goldstein
- Cassadee Pope

== Personnel ==
All Time Low

- Jack Barakat - auxiliary guitar, backing vocals
- Alex Gaskarth - lead guitar, vocals
- Rian Dawson - drums
- Zack Merrick - bass, backing vocals

Additional musicians

- Brian Southall - rhythm guitar
- Matt Flyzik - backing vocals

Live crew

- Matt Flyzik - tour management
- Matt Colussy - tour management (assistant)
- Evan Kirkendall - front of house engineer
- Jeff Maker - lighting designer
- Phil Gornell - monitor engineer
- Danny Kurily - guitar technician
- Alex Grieco - drum technician

DVD/CD Production

- Jeff Juliano - mixing

== Certifications ==
Region	Certification	Certified units/sales
United Kingdom (BPI)	Silver	60,000^{‡}
United States (RIAA) DVD	Gold	50,000^{^}
^{^} Shipments figures based on certification alone.^{‡} Sales+streaming figures based on certification alone.
