= So Wrong, It's Right =

Studio album by All Time Low
- Released: September 25, 2007
- Recorded: April 2007
- Studios: SOMD Studios, Beltsville, Maryland
- Genres: Pop-punk; emo; emo pop
- Length: 40:18
- Label: Hopeless
- Producers: Matt Squire; Paul Leavitt

All Time Low chronology
| Put Up or Shut Up (2006) | So Wrong, It's Right (2007) | Nothing Personal (2009) |

Singles from So Wrong, It's Right
- 1. "Dear Maria, Count Me In" Released: May 6, 2008; 2. "Poppin' Champagne" Released: December 26, 2008

So Wrong, It's Right is the second studio album and major label debut by American rock band All Time Low. Following an unsuccessful showcase for Fueled by Ramen, Hopeless Records signed All Time Low in March 2006. They released an EP, Put Up or Shut Up, through the label in July of that year. After amassing 12 songs by January 2007, the band demoed some of them for Paul Leavitt. The group began recording So Wrong, It's Right in April at SOMD Studios in Beltsville, Maryland with producers Leavitt and Matt Squire. The band wrote five additional songs while in the studio. Following an acoustic tour in June, the band participated in Warped Tour, and "Dear Maria, Count Me In" was made available for streaming. After premiering a music video for "Six Feet Under the Stars", So Wrong, It's Right was released on September 25. The band spent the next three months supporting Boys Like Girls on their US tour.

In early 2008, a music video was released for "Dear Maria, Count Me In", which was followed by an appearance at the Soundwave festival in Australia in February and March. The group participated in the Alternative Press Tour, and appeared at The Bamboozle and Give it a Name festivals, between March and May. "Dear Maria, Count Me In" was released to radio around this time. In July, the band went on a headlining US tour, before taking part in Warped Tour. A deluxe edition of the album followed at the end of July, featuring acoustic versions of songs and music videos. In early August, a music video was premiered for "Poppin' Champagne" on MTV's FNMTV. Later in the month, the band took part in the mtvU Video Music Awards Tour performing at several Six Flags locations, before embarking on a US tour in October and November. "Poppin' Champagne" was released as a single in December featuring two different versions of the track.

So Wrong, It's Right sold 14,225 copies in its first week of release, charting at number 62 on the Billboard 200, as well as reaching the top 20 on several other Billboard charts. The album went on to sell over 180,000 copies by May 2009. "Dear Maria, Count Me In" was certified Gold and then Platinum by the RIAA in April 2011 and April 2015, respectively. So Wrong, It's Right was later certified Platinum by the RIAA in November 2025. The album received a mostly positive response from critics, with several reviewers praising the album's pop-punk sound.

== Background ==
All Time Low released their debut album The Party Scene in July 2005 through independent label Emerald Moon Records. In December, it was announced that the band was no longer signed, but were attracting attention from a number of record labels. In late 2006, the band performed a showcase for John Janick the founder of record label Fueled by Ramen. They were not signed because Cute Is What We Aim For had recently been taken on by the label, which was not in a position to sign another band at the time. (Note: Gaskarth later collaborated with Fueled by Ramen, co-releasing the Friday Night Boys' Off the Deep End (2009) on his label The Party Scene. The group would later sign with Fueled by Ramen in 2016, releasing their seventh album Last Young Renegade with them in 2017.) On March 28, 2006, it was announced that All Time Low had signed with Hopeless Records. The band was brought to the label's attention by fellow touring band Amber Pacific. Following high school graduation, the members focused on the group full-time, and released the Put Up or Shut Up EP in July.

Vocalist/guitarist Alex Gaskarth said the EP helped the band gain new fans, while at the same time allowing them time to progress musically. Gaskarth also said that the group did not want to "feel pressured or rushed" to make an album. Opting to release the EP instead "made the most sense as far as where we were and what we wanted to do". To support its release, the group appeared on a number of Warped Tour dates and toured with Amber Pacific. Gaskarth revealed the band was aiming to enter the recording studio in the winter. In December, the group performed a number of shows. At one of these, they played three new tracks: "Let It Roll", "Dear Maria, Count Me In" and "Remembering Sunday".

== Writing and recording ==
In January 2007, the band said they had composed 12 songs for their second album. Around this time, the group demoed a handful of songs for Paul Leavitt. The band began recording on April 17, 2007, with producers Matt Squire and Leavitt at SOMD Studios in Beltsville, Maryland. The group previously worked with Leavitt on The Party Scene (2005) and the Put Up or Shut Up EP. According to a studio update posted on April 20, guitarist Jack Barakat revealed the band was in pre-production. The group listened to the demos they had recorded previously, picking and choosing which songs they would work on further, as well as parts of other songs they wanted to retain. Gaskarth said the band went into the studio with around 15 songs, before that number was whittled down to three. They subsequently wrote a lot of material in the studio.

In another studio update posted on April 27, Barakat mentioned they had narrowed down the songs that would make the album. Gaskarth said the group needed to write more songs, which resulted in the creation of five additional songs. One of these songs was "Come One, Come All", a track Gaskarth strongly disliked in retrospect. Barakat, who shared Gaskarth's view on the song, added that other songs from the same time would have served better on the record. Barakat mentioned 11 would be on the album, and that they could potentially add "...another [song] here or there if all goes as planned".

Barakat said the band's members "felt that ... we have grown as musicians," with assistance from Squire and Leavitt. Squire worked closely with Gaskarth on creating melodies, while Leavitt worked with drummer Rian Dawson creating, as Barakat describes them, "beastly drum beats". Barakat mentioned that the drum and bass parts were done "pretty straight forward and quick" since Dawson and bassist Zack Merrick were "solid" on their respective instruments. While the bass was being recorded, Squire was working with Gaskarth on vocals. Squire and Leavitt engineered the recordings, while Squire mixed them. Ted Jensen mastered the recordings at Sterling Sound.

== Music and lyrics ==
Musically, the sound of So Wrong, It's Right' has been described as pop-punk. All the songs on the album were written by All Time Low with lyrics by Gaskarth. Sam Hollander and Dave Katz provided additional writing and lyrics on "Holly (Would You Turn Me On?)". The group, along with the Dangerous Summer, Matt Flyzik, Dan Dori, Jason Park and Alex Grieco performed gang vocals. The opening track "This Is How We Do" sets the tone of the album with its double-time drum pattern, loud guitarwork, gang vocals, and joyful lyrics. "Let It Roll" and "Shameless" were reminiscent of the works of New Found Glory. "Six Feet Under the Stars" talks about being young and in love. The acoustic song "Remembering Sunday" features additional vocals from Juliet Simms of Automatic Loveletter.

== Release ==
In June 2007, the group went on an acoustic tour alongside Morning Light and Just Surrender, during which videos of the band performing "Stay Awake (Dreams Only Last for a Night)" were posted online. From late June to late August, the band went on the 2007 edition of Warped Tour. The band then revealed that their second album would be released in September and would be titled So Wrong, It's Right. On July 3, "Dear Maria, Count Me In" was made available for streaming via Alternative Press. The album's track listing was revealed on August 3. On August 19, "Six Feet Under the Stars" was released as a free download via the band's Myspace profile. In August and September, the group went on a UK tour with Plain White T's. This was followed by a US East Coast tour with The Starting Line. On September 21, So Wrong, It's Right was made available for streaming via the band's Myspace profile. A day later, the group performed an album release show at the Recher Theatre in Towson, Maryland. A music video for "Six Feet Under the Stars" premiered on September 24.

On September 25, 2007, So Wrong, It's Right was released through Hopeless Records. The Japanese edition included acoustic versions of "Break Out! Break Out!" and "Stay Awake (Dreams Only Last for a Night)", as well as the music video for "Coffee Shop Soundtrack". The group supported Boys Like Girls on their US headlining tour, dubbed Tourzilla, from late September to late November, and played at a series of in-store performances in October. In January and February 2008, the band went on the Manwhores and Open Sores Tour with Every Avenue, Mayday Parade and Just Surrender. A music video for "Dear Maria, Count Me In", directed by Travis Kopach, premiered on Total Request Live on February 12, 2008. In February and March, the band performed at the Soundwave festival in Australia, as well as two additional sideshows. On March 3, the band made their television debut performing on Jimmy Kimmel Live!, performing "Dear Maria, Count Me In".

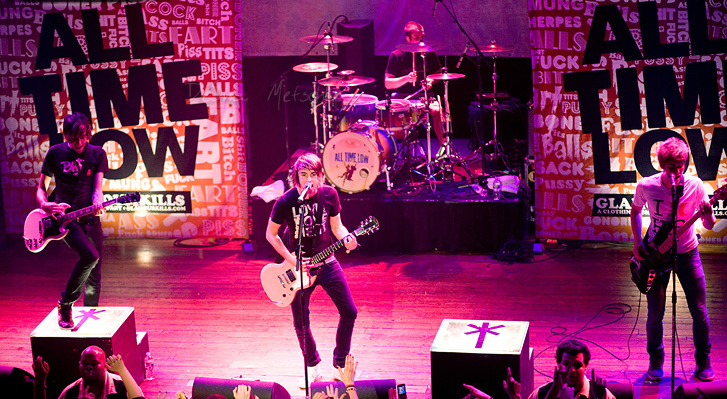
All Time Low performing on the Alternative Press Tour, April 3, 2008

Between mid-March and early May 2008, the group co-headlined the Alternative Press Tour with The Rocket Summer, followed by appearances at The Bamboozle and Give it a Name festivals, in the US and UK respectively. "Dear Maria, Count Me In" was released to radio on May 6. Later that month, the band went on a co-headlining UK tour with Cobra Starship, supported by Broadway Calls. In early July 2008, a music video was filmed for "Poppin' Champagne" in New York City with director Kopach. Shortly afterward, the group went on a headlining US tour with Hit the Lights, Valencia and There for Tomorrow. The band performed on Warped Tour from July 23 until August 18. A deluxe edition of the album was released on July 29, 2008. It featured a video mix of "Poppin' Champagne", acoustic versions of "Dear Maria, Count Me In", "Six Feet Under the Stars", "Let It Roll", and "Stay Awake (Dreams Only Last for a Night)", as well as music videos for "Dear Maria, Count Me In" and "Six Feet Under the Stars".

A music video for "Poppin' Champagne" premiered on MTV's FNMTV on August 1, 2008. Gaskarth later said that if he "could take that video back, I totally would. It's just so absurd and terrible!". In August and September, the band performed at various Six Flags locations as part of the mtvU Video Music Awards Tour. In October and November, the group was part of the Compromising of Integrity, Morality, & Principles in Exchange for Money tour in the US, alongside Mayday Parade, the Maine and Every Avenue. In December, the band went on the Christma-Hanu-Kwanza tour with support from the Audition, Hey Monday, the Friday Night Boys and Sparks the Rescue. A "Poppin' Champagne" single was released on December 26 under the title "Poppin'", featuring a dance remix, a video mix and the music video for the song. The band performed on December 31 for MTV's New Year's Eve Special. The album was released on vinyl in May 2014, and was subsequently repressed in December 2014 and October 2015. The band is scheduled to perform the album in its entirety at three shows in December 2017.

== Reception ==
Professional ratings
Review scores
| Source | Rating |
|---|---|
| AbsolutePunk | 84% |
| AllMusic | 3/5 stars |
| Alternative Addiction | 3/5 stars |
| Alternative Press | 3.5/5 stars |
| AltSounds | 90% |
| Melodic | 3.5/5 stars |

=== Critical response ===
AbsolutePunk reviewer Rohan Kohli said the album was "somewhat of a throwback to the glory days of pop punk," filled with "youthful, summer-y, hook-laden songs". However, he said that it "occasionally suffers from questionable lyrics," as well as mentioning Gaskarth's voice being "sometimes masked by a little studio trickery". In a short review, AllMusic said that the band provides a "sharp, sensitive set of tunes". It also mentioned that the group incorporates "heart-on-the-sleeve sincerity without resorting to emo histrionics". Alternative Addiction said the album was "basically pop-punk by the book, but who minds when it’s this fun?", and described Gaskarth's voice as "pretty much THE standard for pop-punk these days". Tristan Staddon of Alternative Press wrote that the band crafted "pitch-perfect pop-punk anthems" made for "sunny days at the beach/mall and evenings under the stars". He noted that the album contained "less variety ... than you’ll find in a flannel factory," though this "rarely matters since All Time Low’s sugary confections are consistently delicious".

Hannah Eklund of AltSounds called the album a "masterpiece [that] is catchy, vibrant and upbeat". She praised the album's "ridiculously good vibes," which leave you "smiling". In addition, she noted that the music is "full of passion and fun, making them such an easily liked band". Melodic reviewer Tom Spinelli compared the album to the Put Up or Shut Up EP, calling it "full of energy and life". He noted that the album displays "a mature step forward in the "pop punk genre".

=== Commercial performance and accolades ===
So Wrong, It's Right sold 14,225 copies in its first week of release. By May 2009, the album had sold over 180,000 copies. The album charted at number 62 on the Billboard 200, number six on the Independent Albums chart, number 12 on the Alternative Albums chart, number 14 on the Top Rock Albums chart, and number 20 on the Digital Albums chart. It also reached number 167 in Japan. "Dear Maria, Count Me In" was certified Gold by the RIAA in April 2011, and Platinum in April 2015. RIAA certified the album Gold in May 2017.

idobi Radio included the album on their best of 2007 list. Alternative Press included "This Is How We Do" and "Come One, Come All" on their list of the band's best non-single songs. BuzzFeed included the album at number 34 on their 36 Pop Punk Albums You Need To Hear Before You F——ing Die list. The album was included at number 10 on Rock Sound's The 51 Most Essential Pop Punk Albums of All Time list. The album was included on Alternative Press' listicle of albums turning 10 years old in 2017. Mackenize Hall wrote that the album "pleased the cult of existing fans, won over a significant portion of their daily, sweaty crowds and had the industry hungry for more". Hall noted that the band still featured "Remembering Sunday", "Six Feet Under the Stars" and "Dear Maria, Count Me In" in their live sets.

== Track listing ==
All music written and performed by All Time Low, all lyrics written by Alex Gaskarth, except "Holly (Would You Turn Me On)" by All Time Low, Sam Hollander and Dave Katz.

Standard Edition
| No. | Title | Length |
|---|---|---|
| 1. | "This Is How We Do" | 2:29 |
| 2. | "Let It Roll" | 3:00 |
| 3. | "Six Feet Under the Stars" | 3:36 |
| 4. | "Holly (Would You Turn Me On?)" | 3:52 |
| 5. | "The Beach" | 3:01 |
| 6. | "Dear Maria, Count Me In" | 3:02 |
| 7. | "Shameless" | 3:41 |
| 8. | "Remembering Sunday" (featuring Juliet Simms) | 4:16 |
| 9. | "Vegas" | 2:49 |
| 10. | "Stay Awake (Dreams Only Last for a Night)" | 3:34 |
| 11. | "Come One, Come All" | 3:32 |
| 12. | "Poppin' Champagne" | 3:21 |
| Total length: | | 40:12 |

iTunes Deluxe Edition Bonus Tracks
| No. | Title | Length |
|---|---|---|
| 13. | "Poppin' Champagne" (video mix) | 3:05 |
| 14. | "Dear Maria, Count Me In" (Connect Sets acoustic) | 3:28 |
| 15. | "Six Feet Under the Stars" (acoustic) | 3:24 |
| 16. | "Let It Roll" (Connect Sets acoustic) | 3:25 |
| 17. | "Stay Awake (Dreams Only Last for a Night)" (acoustic) | 3:36 |
| 18. | "Dear Maria, Count Me In" (music video) | 3:10 |
| 19. | "Six Feet Under the Stars" (music video) | 3:46 |

Japanese Bonus Tracks
| No. | Title | Length |
|---|---|---|
| 13. | "Break Out! Break Out!" (acoustic) | 3:05 |
| 14. | "Stay Awake (Dreams Only Last for a Night)" (acoustic) | 3:59 |
| 15. | "Coffee Shop Soundtrack" (enhanced video) |

== Personnel ==
Personnel per digital booklet.

All Time Low

- Alex Gaskarth – guitar, lead vocals
- Jack Barakat – guitar
- Rian Dawson – drums
- Zack Merrick – bass

Additional musicians

- Juliet Simms – additional vocals on "Remembering Sunday"
- All Time Low, The Dangerous Summer, Matt Flyzik, Dan Dori, Jason Park, Alex Grieco – gang vocals

Production

- Matt Squire – producer, engineer, mixing
- Paul Leavitt – producer, engineer
- Ted Jensen – mastering
- Jesse Burton – design

== Charts and certifications ==
=== Weekly charts ===
| Chart (2007) | Peak position |
|---|---|
| Japan Albums Chart | 167 |
| US Billboard 200 | 62 |
| US Billboard Alternative Albums | 12 |
| US Billboard Digital Albums | 20 |
| US Billboard Independent Albums | 6 |
| US Billboard Top Rock Albums | 14 |

=== Certifications ===
| Region | Certification | Certified units/sales |
|---|---|---|
| United Kingdom (BPI) | Silver | 60,000^{‡} |
| United States (RIAA) | Platinum | 1,000,000^{‡} |
^{‡} Sales+streaming figures based on certification alone.
