= PMA (song) =

Song by All Time Low and Pale Waves

Single by All Time Low featuring Pale Waves
- Released: July 30, 2021
- Genre: Pop punk
- Length: 3:12
- Label: Fueled by Ramen
- Songwriters: Andrew Goldstein; Alex Gaskarth; Jack Barakat; Kevin Fisher; Phil Gornell; Zakk Cervini
- Producer: Zakk Cervini

All Time Low singles chronology
"Once in a Lifetime" (2021)	"PMA" (2021)	"Ghost Story" (2021)

Pale Waves singles chronology
"Fall to Pieces" (2021)	"PMA" (2021)	"Lies" (2022)

Music video
- "PMA" on YouTube

"PMA" (acronym for "Post-Modern Anxiety") is a song by the American rock band All Time Low featuring Heather Baron-Gracie from the British band Pale Waves.

== Background ==
In 2020, during the COVID-19 lockdowns, the members of All Time Low returned to the mansion in Palm Desert, California, where they had recorded their last studio album, Wake Up, Sunshine (2020). Because the band was unable to tour, they decided to work on new music since, as Alex Gaskarth explained to Rock Sound, it was "one of the only things [they] had much control over". "PMA" was written at this time and lyrically inspired by the "mental and emotional fatigue that we all went through as a society", according to Gaskarth. In the aforementioned Rock Sound interview, Gaskarth explained: "It was really about ... connecting with that shared experience of loneliness and trauma, and somehow being OK with it, because we have to be." Gaskarth later expanded on these sentiments during an interview with Kerrang!:

"PMA" kind of stemmed from lockdown—the song is about loneliness and isolation, and the realisation that this was a shared experience. There was something wholly unique about the fact that we were all collectively lonely as hell for a while there, and "PMA" talks about almost finding hope in the fact that we were all in it together. A very heavy sense of doom and gloom was lingering, but so too was there an overwhelming feeling that we were experiencing this as one. Ultimately, we’re all going through this together, and it’s kind of an opportunity to learn and grow. "PMA" is about that dichotomy, and finding the in between in all this.

When the band had finished writing "PMA", they realized "it would be better served as a duet ... because about this feeling of togetherness". Gaskarth decided to reach out to Heather Baron-Gracie of the English band Pale Waves, as he had always been a fan of her band's work. In an interview with NME, Baron-Gracie explained: "I was in Nashville and you were in LA. We spoke about our love for music and then [Alex] sent me the track and it said 'Post Modern Anxiety rough'. I was like 'How is this rough? – It already sounds so amazing!'" Because everyone involved was vaccinated, Baron-Gracie was able to record her parts alongside All Time Low in the studio, which, as Gaskarth noted, was "the first time since the pandemic started that [he] got to get in the room with an artist from another band and work on something."

== Reception ==
Josh Carter of Alternative Press called "PMA" an "exposé of emotional transparency in the wake of COVID-19" and "the perfect conclusion after a year-and-a-half of uncertainty." Tamara May of Wall of Sound wrote that the song was "cathartic and catchy", "act[ing] as that self-reassurance you’ve been searching for".

== Charts ==
Chart performance for "PMA"
Chart (2021)	Peak position
UK Singles Downloads (OCC)	77
US Alternative Digital Song Sales	22
