= Somewhere in Neverland =

Single by All Time Low

from the album Don't Panic
- Released: September 18, 2012
- Genre: Emo pop
- Length: 3:45
- Label: Hopeless
- Songwriter(s): Jack Barakat; Rian Dawson; Alex Gaskarth; Mike Green; Zack Merrick
- Producer(s): Alex Gaskarth; Mike Green

All Time Low singles chronology
"For Baltimore" (2012)	"Somewhere in Neverland" (2012)	"Backseat Serenade" (2013)

Music video
- "Somewhere in Neverland" on YouTube

"Somewhere in Neverland" is a song by American rock band All Time Low for their fifth studio album Don't Panic (2012). Written and produced by the band's lead vocalist/guitarist Alex Gaskarth and Mike Green, the song was released through Hopeless Records as the second official single off the album on September 18, 2012. The song uses allusions to Peter Pan and the story Peter and Wendy as a metaphor for the narrator refusing to grow up.

== Reception ==
Tim Sendra of AllMusic labelled "Somewhere in Neverland" as a surefire radio hit and one of three "album picks" for its "sweetly desperate romanticism." The iTunes review for Don't Panic cited "Somewhere in Neverland" as an "unarguably catchy" album highlight, describing it as a "salient single that chugs on power pop chords [...] before triggering a chorus peppered with more barbed hooks than a tackle box." Joseph Atilano of Inquirer.net praised Gaskarth's songwriting abilities on the song as well as the catchiness of the chorus, summarizing the song as "addictive".

== Music video ==
The music video for "Somewhere in Neverland" premiered on March 19, 2013. Directed by Raul Gonzo, the video features the band escaping their boring work life through some "creative use" of a photocopier, with such scenes as a hot air balloon ride and a Moon landing depicted on Xeroxed papers. MTV correspondent James Montgomery praised the video for being enjoyable in spite of its evidently limited budget: "Working with limited funds, they've managed to create a clip that's both funny and strangely sweet."

== Chart performance ==
Chart (2012)	Peak position
UK Singles (Official Charts Company)	111
UK Rock (Official Charts Company)	1
US Rock Digital Songs (Billboard)	26
