= Dirty Laundry (All Time Low song) =

Single by All Time Low

from the album Last Young Renegade
- Released: February 17, 2017
- Genre: Pop rock; electronic rock
- Length: 3:17
- Label: Fueled by Ramen
- Songwriters: Alex Gaskarth; Colin Brittain; Nick Furlong; Nick Long
- Producers: Furlong; Brittain; Long

All Time Low singles chronology
| "Kids in the Dark" (2015) | "Dirty Laundry" (2017) | "Last Young Renegade" (2017) |

Music video
- "Dirty Laundry" on YouTube

"Dirty Laundry" is a song by American rock band All Time Low for their seventh studio album, Last Young Renegade (2017). It was released as the album's lead single on February 17, 2017 and serves as the group's first release on the Fueled by Ramen label. The song impacted American alternative radio on March 7, 2017.

== Content ==
"Dirty Laundry" is primarily a pop rock song with influences of electronic music in its production. The song begins with a guitar riff and a "dance-esque beat" that build over the course of the song toward a climax near the end of the song. Lead vocalist Alex Gaskarth's vocals likewise start soft and reach a "raw and powerful" sound later. Lyrically, the song encapsulates a previous relationship and accepting the mistakes both parties have made in the past. "Dirty Laundry" is "about leaving the past where it belongs, and loving the people around you for not only their light, but their darkness too," according to Gaskarth.

== Critical reception ==
Emma Ramsbottom of Redbrick wrote that the song's new sonic territory was "somewhat refreshing" and that "Dirty Laundry" left her "feeling excited for what's to come" on the album. Heather Allen of Mind Equals Blown rated the song 6/10, writing that it was "simply okay." Allen wrote that "what "Dirty Laundry" lacks in musical familiarity and anthemic quality... it makes up for in darker tones and honest lyrics."

== Commercial performance ==
"Dirty Laundry" debuted and peaked at number 16 on the Billboard Hot Rock Songs chart dated March 11, 2017. In the United Kingdom, the song debuted at number 91 on the UK Singles Chart and at number one on the UK Rock & Metal Singles chart for the week ending March 2, 2017, becoming the group's third chart-topper on the latter.

== Music video ==
An accompanying music video, directed by Pat Tracy, premiered on February 17, 2017. Set in a laundromat, the video revolves around a vivid daydream experienced by band frontman Alex Gaskarth. The final scene, where Gaskarth loads his laundry into a Mustang and drives away, nearly resulted in a collision due to oversteering.

== Charts ==
| Chart (2017) | Peak position |
|---|---|
| UK Singles (OCC) | 91 |
| UK Rock & Metal (OCC) | 1 |
| US Hot Rock & Alternative Songs (Billboard) | 16 |

== Release history ==
List of release dates, showing region, release format, label catalog number, and reference
| Region | Date | Format(s) | Label | Cat. number | Ref. |
|---|---|---|---|---|---|
| Worldwide | February 17, 2017 | Digital download | Fueled by Ramen; Atlantic; Warner | 1204360862 | |
| United States | March 7, 2017 | Modern rock radio | Fueled by Ramen | —N/a | |
| United Kingdom | March 10, 2017 | Mainstream radio | Fueled by Ramen | —N/a | |

== Personnel ==
- Alex Gaskarth – lead vocals, rhythm guitar
- Jack Barakat – lead guitar, backing vocals
- Zack Merrick – bass, backing vocals
- Rian Dawson – drums, percussion
- Serban Ghenea - mixing
