= Future Hearts =

Studio album by All Time Low
- Released: April 7, 2015
- Recorded: September 2014 – 2015
- Genre: Pop-punk; pop rock; power pop; alternative rock; emo pop
- Length: 45:41
- Label: Hopeless
- Producer: John Feldmann; Mike Green

All Time Low chronology
Don't Panic (2012)	Future Hearts (2015)	Straight to DVD II: Past, Present and Future Hearts (2016)

Singles from Future Hearts
- 1. "Something's Gotta Give" Released: January 12, 2015; 2. "Kids in the Dark" Released: March 9, 2015

Future Hearts is the sixth studio album by American rock band All Time Low, released April 7, 2015 by Hopeless Records as the follow-up to Don't Panic (2012). The first single, "Something's Gotta Give" premiered on BBC Radio 1 on January 12, 2015. Every physical copy contains five of twenty collectible "polaroids". Deluxe editions of Future Hearts feature bonus songs, expanded artwork and an alternative cover. This is the last All Time Low album to be released on Hopeless Records.

Future Hearts debuted at No. 2 on the Billboard 200, selling 75,000 copies in its first week, becoming the band's highest charting and biggest selling week so far. It also debuted at No. 1 in the UK and in the top 10 in Australia and New Zealand album charts. It has received generally positive reviews from critics, who generally praised the new musical direction but criticised the lack of cohesiveness. The album is notable due to the influence of outside songwriters; not a single song on the album was written without help by the band itself.

== Background and recording ==
The band entered the studio on September 26, 2014, with producer John Feldmann.

All Time Low recruited Mark Hoppus and Joel Madden as guest artists.

"It feels like a definite progression. I wouldn’t say it’s an insane departure or anything like that. We haven’t gone completely the other way and tried all kinds of new things. We’ve certainly tried some new things, but I don’t think it’s necessarily going to alienate anyone or push people away that loved the last record. There’s a lot of stuff that’s in line with Don’t Panic, but there’s a lot of stuff that’s a logical next step from it, too."—vocalist/guitarist Alex Gaskarth.

Maria Sherman of Fuse positively compared "Something's Gotta Give" to Yellowcard, stating it recalled that group's "cinematic songwriting, bridges with gang vocals, technical guitar breakdowns—huge rock and roll stuff!", and acknowledged the "classic All Time Low self-deprecating lyricism".

== Release ==
Following a premier on BBC Radio 1, a music video was released for "Something's Gotta Give" on January 12, 2015. In addition it was mentioned that the group's next album, titled Future Hearts, would be released in April. In February, the group went on a co-headlining UK arena tour with You Me at Six. In February and March, the band performed at Soundwave festival in Australia. "Kids in the Dark" was made available for streaming on March 9. A music video was released the follow day. On March 20, the group performed a headlining show at Wembley Arena in London with Neck Deep and Real Friends. On March 23, "Runaways" was premiered via MTV. "Tidal Waves" was released through Fuse a day before the iTunes release. Future Hearts was released on April 7 through Hopeless Records.

In April and May, the band embarked on a headlining US tour with support from Issues, Tonight Alive and State Champs. In July, the group appeared at MTV Fandom Fest, then at Reading and Leeds in the UK in August. On August 25, a music video was released for "Runaways", premiering on Conan O'Brien's website. In October and November, the group embarked on the Back to the Future Hearts Tour in the US with support from Sleeping with Sirens, Neck Deep and One Ok Rock. The band then brought the tour to the UK and Ireland in February 2016, with supporting acts Good Charlotte and Against the Current. A music video was released for "Missing You" on April 5. In June, the group performed at the X Games. In November, the group supported Simple Plan on their tour of Canada.

== Reception ==
=== Critical response ===
Professional ratings
Aggregate scores
Source	Rating
Metacritic	74/100
Review scores
Source	Rating
AbsolutePunk.net	80/100
Alter the Press!	5/5
AltSounds	86/100
DIY	3/5 stars
Exclaim!	6/10 stars
Rolling Stone Australia	3/5 stars
aNewRisingMusic	4.5/5 stars

The album holds a Metacritic score of 74, based on seven reviews, which indicates "generally favorable reviews". On a highly positive analysis, Thomas Nassiff of Absolutepunk.net stated that "All Time Low has accomplished something more rare than a No. 1 single or a platinum album with Future Hearts -- they've reached one of the most unreachable points for a band from their corner of the world, a point of true lasting value." Writing for Exclaim!, Branan Ranjanathan highlighted the "unashamedly formulaic nature" of the record, further explaining that "there are brief moments where the band let loose, and their ability to write far punchier songs becomes apparent, but many tracks on this album — especially towards the second half — are overproduced to the point that even the highlights are overshadowed."

The album was ranked at number 3 in Alternative Press's "10 Essential Records of 2015" list. Mackenzie Hall of Alternative Press wrote the band "spoke of wanting to return to their roots and they certainly delivered on this catchy-as-hell-pop-punk masterpiece." The album was included at number 7 on Rock Sound's top 50 releases of 2015 list. "Something's Gotta Give" was nominated for Best Music Video and Future Hearts was nominated for Album Of The Year at the 2016 Alternative Press Music Awards. "Missing You" was nominated for Best Track at the 2016 Kerrang! Awards.

=== Commercial performance ===
Future Hearts debuted at number 2 on the Billboard 200, selling 80,000 total copies in its first week, becoming the band's highest charting and biggest selling week so far. However, with 75,000 traditional album sales, it was the top selling "pure" album that week. Despite the number 1 Billboard 200 album—Furious 7: Original Motion Picture Soundtrack—only selling 58,000 traditional album that week, the 464,000 sales of its single "See You Again" counted towards its 111,000 album consumption units for the chart's revamped metrics. Future Hearts became the band's third number 1 on the Billboard Rock Albums Chart, and also number 1 on the Vinyl Albums chart with 5000 units. In its second week, it dropped to number 34 on the Billboard 200 and number 22 on Top Album Sales.

Future Hearts debuted at number 1 on the UK Albums Chart on April 12, 2015, with over 19,400 first week sales, becoming All Time Low's first ever UK number 1. The album also debuted at number 4 on the Australian Albums Chart and number 7 on the New Zealand Albums Chart. "Something's Gotta Give" debuted at No. 84 on the UK Singles Chart and at No. 2 on the UK Rock Chart. It also debuted at No. 14 on US Hot Rock Songs and No. 21 on the Bubbling Under Hot 100 Singles chart.

== Track listing ==
Writing credits per ASCAP and BMI.

Standard Edition
No.	Title	Writer(s)	Length
1.	"Satellite"	John Feldmann; Alex Gaskarth; Simon Wilcox	2:24
2.	"Kicking & Screaming"	Jack Barakat; Rian Dawson; Gaskarth; Mike Green; Zack Merrick	3:26
3.	"Something's Gotta Give"	Dan Book; Gaskarth; Andrew Goldstein; Alexei Misoul	3:09
4.	"Kids in the Dark"	Barakat; Dawson; Gaskarth; Green; Merrick	3:36
5.	"Runaways"	Feldmann; Nick Furlong; Gaskarth	3:34
6.	"Missing You"	Gaskarth; Jake Gosling; Christopher Leonard	4:04
7.	"Cinderblock Garden"	Gaskarth; David Hodges; Cameron Walker	3:35
8.	"Tidal Waves" (featuring Mark Hoppus)	Feldmann; Gaskarth; Wilcox	4:09
9.	"Don't You Go"	Feldmann; Furlong; Gaskarth	3:05
10.	"Bail Me Out" (featuring Joel Madden)	Feldmann; Gaskarth; Benji Madden; Joel Madden	3:32
11.	"Dancing with a Wolf"	Gaskarth; Green; Nico Hartikainen	3:39
12.	"The Edge of Tonight"	Feldmann; Gaskarth	3:51
13.	"Old Scars / Future Hearts"	Feldmann; Gaskarth	3:26
Total length:			45:41

Deluxe Edition Bonus Tracks
No.	Title	Writer(s)	Length
14.	"Bottle and a Beat"	Barakat; Dawson; Gaskarth; Green; Merrick	3:40
15.	"Your Bed"	Barakat; Dawson; Gaskarth; Green; Merrick	3:40
16.	"Cinderblock Garden" (acoustic)	Gaskarth; Hodges; Cameron Walker	3:47

Best Buy, HMV and Suburban Records Edition Bonus Tracks
No.	Title	Writer(s)	Length
14.	"How the Story Ends"	Feldmann; Gaskarth; B. Madden; J. Madden	3:25
15.	"Something's Gotta Give" (acoustic)	Book; Gaskarth; Goldstein; Misoul	3:13

B-Sides
No.	Title	Writer(s)	Length
1.	"Bottle and a Beat"	Barakat; Dawson; Gaskarth; Green; Merrick	3:40
2.	"Your Bed"	Barakat; Dawson; Gaskarth; Green; Merrick	3:40
3.	"How the Story Ends"	Feldmann; Gaskarth; B. Madden; J. Madden	3:25
4.	"Something's Gotta Give" (acoustic)	Book; Gaskarth; Goldstein; Misoul	3:13
5.	"Cinderblock Garden" (acoustic)	Gaskarth; Hodges; Walker	3:47
Total length:			17:45

== Personnel ==
Credits adapted from the album's liner notes.

=== All Time Low ===
- Alex Gaskarth – performance, additional production (all tracks); production (15), Polaroid photos
- Jack Barakat – performance, Polaroid photos
- Rian Dawson – performance (all tracks); production mixing (track 15); additional engineering (8), additional production (4, 11), Polaroid photos
- Zack Merrick – performance, Polaroid photos

=== Additional contributors ===
- John Feldmann – recording, programming, additional vocals (all tracks); production (1, 3, 5–10, 12–16), additional production (2)
- Mike Green – production (2, 4, 11)
- Courtney Ballard – engineering, editing
- Kyle Black – engineering, editing
- Zakk Cervini – engineering, programming, additional production, editing
- Matt Pauling – engineering, programming, additional production, editing (all tracks); mandolin, banjo, ukulele, additional guitars (16)
- Neal Avron – mixing (1, 5, 7, 10, 12–14)
- Chris Lord-Alge – mixing (2–4, 6, 8, 9, 11)
- Scott Skryzinski – mixing assistance (1, 5, 7, 10, 12–14)
- Ted Jensen – mastering
- Zien Garcia – production assistance, recording assistance
- Jonathan Weiner – album photos
- Brian Manley – art design

== Charts ==
=== Weekly charts ===
Weekly chart performance for Future Hearts
Chart (2015)	Peak position
Australian Albums (ARIA)	4
Austrian Albums (Ö3 Austria)	31
Belgian Albums (Ultratop Flanders)	27
Belgian Albums (Ultratop Wallonia)	96
Canadian Albums (Billboard)	3
Dutch Albums (Album Top 100)	18
German Albums (Offizielle Top 100)	60
Irish Albums (IRMA)	7
Italian Albums (FIMI)	94
Japanese Albums (Oricon)	37
New Zealand Albums (RMNZ)	7
Norwegian Albums (VG-lista)	21
Scottish Albums (OCC)	1
Spanish Albums (Promusicae)	54
Swedish Albums (Sverigetopplistan)	53
UK Albums (OCC)	1
UK Rock & Metal Albums (OCC)	1
US Billboard 200	2
US Independent Albums (Billboard)	1
US Top Rock Albums (Billboard)	1
US Top Alternative Albums (Billboard)	1

=== Year-end charts ===
Year-end chart performance for Future Hearts
Chart (2015)	Position
US Independent Albums (Billboard)	9
US Top Rock Albums (Billboard)	27
US Top Alternative Albums (Billboard)	22

== Certifications ==
Certifications for Future Hearts
Region	Certification	Certified units/sales
United Kingdom (BPI)	Gold	100,000^{‡}
^{‡} Sales+streaming figures based on certification alone.
