= Everyone's Talking! =

Studio album by All Time Low
- Released: October 17, 2025
- Genre: Pop-punk • pop rock
- Length: 41:22
- Label: Photo Finish; Basement Noise; Virgin
- Producer: Dan Swank; Zakk Cervini; Dan Book; Andrew Goldstein

All Time Low chronology
Tell Me I'm Alive (2023)	Everyone's Talking! (2025)

Singles from Everyone’s Talking!
- 1. "Suckerpunch" Released: June 13, 2025; 2. "The Weather" Released: July 11, 2025; 3. "Oh No!" Released: September 5, 2025; 4. "Butterflies" Released: September 19, 2025; 5. "Sugar" Released: October 16, 2025

Everyone's Talking is the tenth studio album by American rock band All Time Low. It was released on October 17, 2025, through the band's imprint Basement Noise, and distributed by Photo Finish Records and Virgin. The album was preceded by five singles, "Suckerpunch", "The Weather", "Oh No!", "Butterflies", and "Sugar" (featuring JoJo). The second single was released alongside the album announcement. The band announced the North American leg of Everyone's Talking! The World Tour on June 16, 2025, and the European leg on July 14, 2025.

== Track listing ==
Everyone's Talking track listing
No.	Title	Writer(s)	Producer(s)	Length
1.	"[Cold Open]"	Alex Gaskarth; Dan Swank	Swank	1:01
2.	"Everyone's Talking"	Gaskarth; Swank	Swank	2:39
3.	"Suckerpunch"	Gaskarth; Jack Barakat; Swank	Swank	2:51
4.	"Oh No!"	Gaskarth; Swank	Swank	3:15
5.	"The Weather"	Gaskarth; Zakk Cervini; Barakat	Cervini	2:50
6.	"Falling for Strangers"	Gaskarth; Barakat; Swank	Swank	3:01
7.	"Viva Las Vagus Nerve"	Gaskarth; Barakat; Swank	Swank	2:57
8.	"Sugar" (featuring JoJo)	Gaskarth; Barakat; Swank	Swank	2:59
9.	"Goodnight, C'est La Vie"	Gaskarth; Barakat; Swank	Swank	1:04
10.	"Bubblegum"	Gaskarth; Barakat; Cervini; Andrew Goldstein	Goldstein; Cervini	2:53
11.	"Little Bit"	Gaskarth; Barakat; Swank	Swank	2:31
12.	"Cigarettes & Sabotage"	Gaskarth; Swank	Swank	2:50
13.	"Tread Water" (featuring Ruston Kelly)	Gaskarth; Swank	Swank	3:35
14.	"Different Languages"	Gaskarth; Swank; Dan Book	Swank; Book	3:42
15.	"Butterflies"	Gaskarth; Barakat; Cervini	Swank	3:09
Total length:				41:22

== Personnel ==
Credits adapted from the digital liner notes of Everyone's Talking!.

All Time Low

- Alex Gaskarth – lead vocals, guitar, keyboards
- Jack Barakat – guitar, backing vocals
- Zack Merrick – bass, backing vocals
- Rian Dawson – drums, programmed drums, percussion

Additional personnel

- JoJo – guest vocals (8)
- Ruston Kelly – guest vocals (13)
- Dan Swank – producer, keyboards
- Zakk Cervini – producer
- Dan Book – producer
- Andrew Goldstein – producer

== Charts ==
Chart performance for Everyone's Talking!
Chart (2025)	Peak position
Australian Albums (ARIA)	79
Scottish Albums (OCC)	12
UK Albums (OCC)	68
UK Independent Albums (OCC)	5
US Billboard 200	192
US Independent Albums (Billboard)	28
US Top Rock & Alternative Albums (Billboard)	46
