= Put Up or Shut Up =

EP by All Time Low
- Released: July 25, 2006
- Recorded: March 2006
- Studios: Valencia Studios, Baltimore, MD; Paul Leavitt's basement, Baltimore, MD
- Genre: Pop-punk
- Length: 23:24
- Label: Hopeless
- Producer: Paul Leavitt

All Time Low chronology
The Party Scene (2005)	Put Up or Shut Up (2006)	So Wrong, It's Right (2007)

Put Up or Shut Up is an EP by American rock band All Time Low released, released on July 25, 2006 through Hopeless Records.

== Background ==
Five of the tracks are re-recordings of The Party Scene (2005) songs. The title originates from lyrics taken from "Break Out! Break Out!".

On March 28, 2006, it was announced that the band signed to Hopeless Records. The group finished recording Put Up or Shut Up in March, before embarking on a tour with Transition a month later. From August to October, the band supported Amber Pacific on their tour of the U.S.

== Music and lyrics ==
Emily Zemler of Alternative Press called the tracks on the EP "bouncy pop-punk", while comparing the sound of the EP overall to Fall Out Boy and New Found Glory. The album's lyrical themes include disappointment, heartbreak, and adolescence.

== Reception ==
Professional ratings
Review scores
Source	Rating
AbsolutePunk.net	(81%)
AllMusic	2.5/5 stars
Exclaim!	Favorable
Melodic	3.5/5 stars

The EP has sold over 60,000 copies.

== Track listing ==
All lyrics are written by Alex Gaskarth; all music is composed by All Time Low.

No.	Title	Length
1.	"Coffee Shop Soundtrack"	3:01
2.	"Break Out! Break Out!"	3:03
3.	"The Girl's a Straight-Up Hustler"	3:38
4.	"Jasey Rae"	3:39
5.	"The Party Scene"	2:57
6.	"Running from Lions"	3:01
7.	"Lullabies"	4:03
Total length:		23:22

- Tracks 2, 3, 5, 6, and 7 are all re-recordings of songs from The Party Scene.

iTunes deluxe edition
No.	Title	Length
8.	"Coffee Shop Soundtrack" (Acoustic remix)	3:53
9.	"Jasey Rae" (Acoustic)	3:34
Total length:		30:49

== Personnel ==
Personnel credits from Genius.

All Time Low

- Alex Gaskarth – lead vocals, rhythm guitar, songwriting
- Jack Barakat – lead guitar, backing vocals
- Zack Merrick – bass guitar, backing vocals
- Rian Dawson – drums, percussion

Production

- Paul Leavitt - production, engineering
- Zack Odom - mixing
- Kenneth Mount - mixing
- Gavin Lurssen - mastering

== Charts ==
Chart (2006)	Peak position
US Independent Albums	20
US Heatseeker Albums	12
