= Tell Me I'm Alive =

Studio album by All Time Low
- Released: March 17, 2023
- Recorded: 2022
- Genre: Pop-punk; pop rock
- Length: 41:02
- Label: Fueled by Ramen
- Producer: Alex Gaskarth; Andrew Goldstein; Dan Book; Phil Gornell; Zakk Cervini

All Time Low chronology
Wake Up, Sunshine (2020)	Tell Me I'm Alive (2023)	Everyone's Talking! (2025)

Singles from Tell Me I'm Alive
- 1. "Sleepwalking" Released: October 7, 2022; 2. "Tell Me I'm Alive" Released: January 13, 2023; 3. "Modern Love" Released: February 14, 2023; 4. "Calm Down" Released: March 17, 2023

Tell Me I'm Alive is the ninth studio album by American rock band All Time Low. It was released on March 17, 2023, as the band's third and final release with major label Fueled by Ramen.

== Background and recording ==
The release of Wake Up, Sunshine in April 2020 coincided with the COVID-19 pandemic, preventing the band from touring. They continued to write music amidst global shutdowns; over the course of two years, the band wrote an estimated 30 songs, some of which became tracks on Tell Me I'm Alive. Vocalist Alex Gaskarth and guitarist Jack Barakat stated that many of the album's themes, such as loneliness, were drawn from emotions and experiences they had witnessed during the pandemic.

== Composition ==
Critics of Tell Me I'm Alive have described the album as a blend of pop rock and pop punk. Tracks on the album prominently feature synth and piano.

In an interview with the Daily Express, Gaskarth described the album's sound as an "amalgamation" of Last Young Renegade and Wake Up, Sunshine. He stated in a separate interview with Recovery Magazine that many songs on the album were influenced by artists like Queen and Elton John.

== Reception ==
Professional ratings
Review scores
Source	Rating
Kerrang!	3/5
Wall of Sound	4/10

Callum Crumlish praised the album's sound and lyrical quality. Mark Sutherland of Kerrang! acknowledged the band's growing maturity and praised Gaskarth's vocals, but noted that the music style shifted from pop-punk to pop rock and unfavorably compared songs "New Religion" and "Calm Down" to works by Maroon 5 and Ed Sheeran, respectively.

== Track listing ==
Tell Me I'm Alive track listing
No.	Title	Writer(s)	Producer(s)	Length
1.	"Tell Me I'm Alive"	Alex Gaskarth; Jack Barakat; Andrew Goldstein	Gaskarth; Goldstein; Zakk Cervini	2:36
2.	"Modern Love"	Gaskarth; Barakat; Dan Swank; Phil Gornell	Gaskarth; Cervini; Gornell	3:15
3.	"Are You There?"	Gaskarth; Cervini	Gaskarth; Cervini	3:13
4.	"Sleepwalking"	Gaskarth; Goldstein; Barakat	Gaskarth; Cervini; Goldstein	3:07
5.	"Calm Down"	Gaskarth; Goldstein; Nolan Sipe; Sam Farrar; Sean Van Vleet	Gaskarth; Cervini	3:14
6.	"English Blood // American Heartache"	Gaskarth; Swank; Barakat; Gornell	Gaskarth; Cervini; Gornell	3:16
7.	"The Sound of Letting Go"	Gaskarth; Goldstein	Gaskarth; Cervini; Goldstein	2:39
8.	"New Religion" (featuring Teddy Swims)	Gaskarth; Dan Book; Barakat	Gaskarth; Cervini; Book	3:04
9.	"The Way You Miss Me"	Gaskarth; Goldstein	Gaskarth; Cervini; Goldstein	3:40
10.	"I'd Be Fine (If I Never Saw You Again)"	Gaskarth; Cervini	Gaskarth; Cervini	2:59
11.	"Kill Ur Vibe"	Gaskarth; Cervini	Gaskarth; Cervini	3:30
12.	"The Other Side"	Gaskarth; Cervini; Bonnie McKee	Gaskarth; Cervini	2:48
13.	"Lost Along the Way"	Gaskarth; Cervini	Gaskarth; Cervini	3:41
Total length:				41:02

Japanese bonus tracks
No.	Title	Writer(s)	Length
14.	"Sleepwalking" (Mokita & Goldhouse Remix)	Gaskarth; Goldstein; Barakat
15.	"Sleepwalking" (Unplugged)	Gaskarth; Goldstein; Barakat

== Personnel ==
Credits adapted from the album's liner notes.

All Time Low

- Alex Gaskarth – vocals, guitar, creative direction
- Jack Barakat – guitar, creative direction
- Zack Merrick – bass guitar, creative direction
- Rian Dawson – drums, percussion, creative direction

Additional contributors

- Ted Jensen – mastering
- Neal Avron – mixing (1, 2, 4, 5, 9)
- Zakk Cervini – mixing (3, 6–8, 10–13)
- Andrew Cook – creative direction, design, layout

== Charts ==
Chart performance for Tell Me I'm Alive
Chart (2023)	Peak position
Australian Albums (ARIA)	38
German Albums (Offizielle Top 100)	87
Scottish Albums (OCC)	3
UK Albums (OCC)	12
UK Record Store Albums (OCC)	1
