= The Party Scene =

Studio album by All Time Low
- Released: July 19, 2005
- Recorded: Valencia Studios (Silver Spring, Maryland), Paul Leavitt's basement (Silver Spring, Maryland)
- Genres: Pop punk, Emo, Post-hardcore
- Length: 39:43
- Label: Emerald Moon
- Producer: Paul Leavitt

All Time Low chronology
The Three Words to Remember in Dealing with the End EP (2004)	The Party Scene (2005)	Put Up or Shut Up (2006)

Professional ratings
Review scores
Source	Rating
AbsolutePunk	81%

The Party Scene is the debut studio album by American rock band All Time Low, released on July 19, 2005 via regional imprint Emerald Moon Records. Music videos were released for "Circles" and "The Girl's a Straight-Up Hustler". Tracks 2, 3, 8, 9 and 12 were re-recorded for the band's next EP, Put Up or Shut Up.

== Track listing ==
All music and arrangements by All Time Low; except where noted. All lyrics by Alex Gaskarth. Additional arrangements by Paul Leavitt.

No.	Title	Length
1.	"Prelude"	0:43
2.	"The Party Scene"	2:58
3.	"Lullabies"	3:58
4.	"Hometown Heroes; National Nobodies"	2:53
5.	"Circles"	3:20
6.	"Interlude"	1:50
7.	"We Say Summer"	3:06
8.	"Break Out! Break Out!"	3:10
9.	"Running from Lions"	3:06
10.	"Noel"	4:10
11.	"I Can't Do the One-Two Step"	4:02
12.	"The Girl's a Straight-Up Hustler"	3:59
13.	"Sticks, Stones, and Techno" (Alex Gaskarth and Paul Leavitt)	2:23
Total length:		39:43

== Personnel ==
Personnel per booklet.

All Time Low

- Alex Gaskarth – lead vocals, rhythm guitar
- Rian Dawson – drums
- Zack Merrick – bass, backing vocals
- Jack Barakat – lead guitar

Additional musicians

- Alex Gaskarth and Paul Leavitt – piano, synths, strings, percussion, effects
- Matt Parsons of Silent Film – additional vocals on "The Girl's a Straight-Up Hustler"

Production

- Paul Leavitt – producer, mixing, engineering
- Alan Douches – mastering
- Mario Garza of Robot Plague – CD layout/design
