= Alex Gaskarth =

American musician (born 1987)

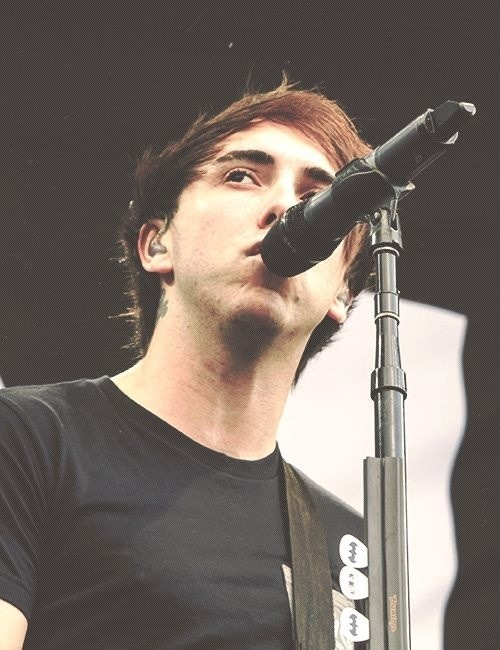
- Gaskarth performing with All Time Low in 2012

Background information
- Born: Alexander William Gaskarth; December 14, 1987 (age 38); Harlow, Essex, England
- Origin: Baltimore, Maryland, U.S.
- Genres: Pop punk; emo pop; power pop; pop rock; alternative rock
- Occupations: Singer; musician; songwriter
- Instruments: Vocals; guitar
- Years active: 2002–present
- Member of: All Time Low
- Formerly of: Simple Creatures
- Spouse: Lisa Ruocco (m. 2016)
- Website: alltimelow.com

Alexander William Gaskarth (born December 14, 1987) is a British-born American musician. He has been the lead vocalist, rhythm guitarist and primary songwriter for the rock band All Time Low since its formation in 2003.

== Early life ==
Gaskarth was born in Harlow, Essex, England. He spent his childhood in Toot Hill until the age of six, when his father's employment led them to immigrate to the United States. Gaskarth graduated from Dulaney High School in 2006. Gaskarth has two older half-sisters, Jilan and Helen, and had a half-brother, Tom, who died when Gaskarth was 12. In memory of him, Gaskarth got a rose tattoo on his left hand, and wrote the song "Lullabies".

== Career ==
=== All Time Low (2003–present) ===
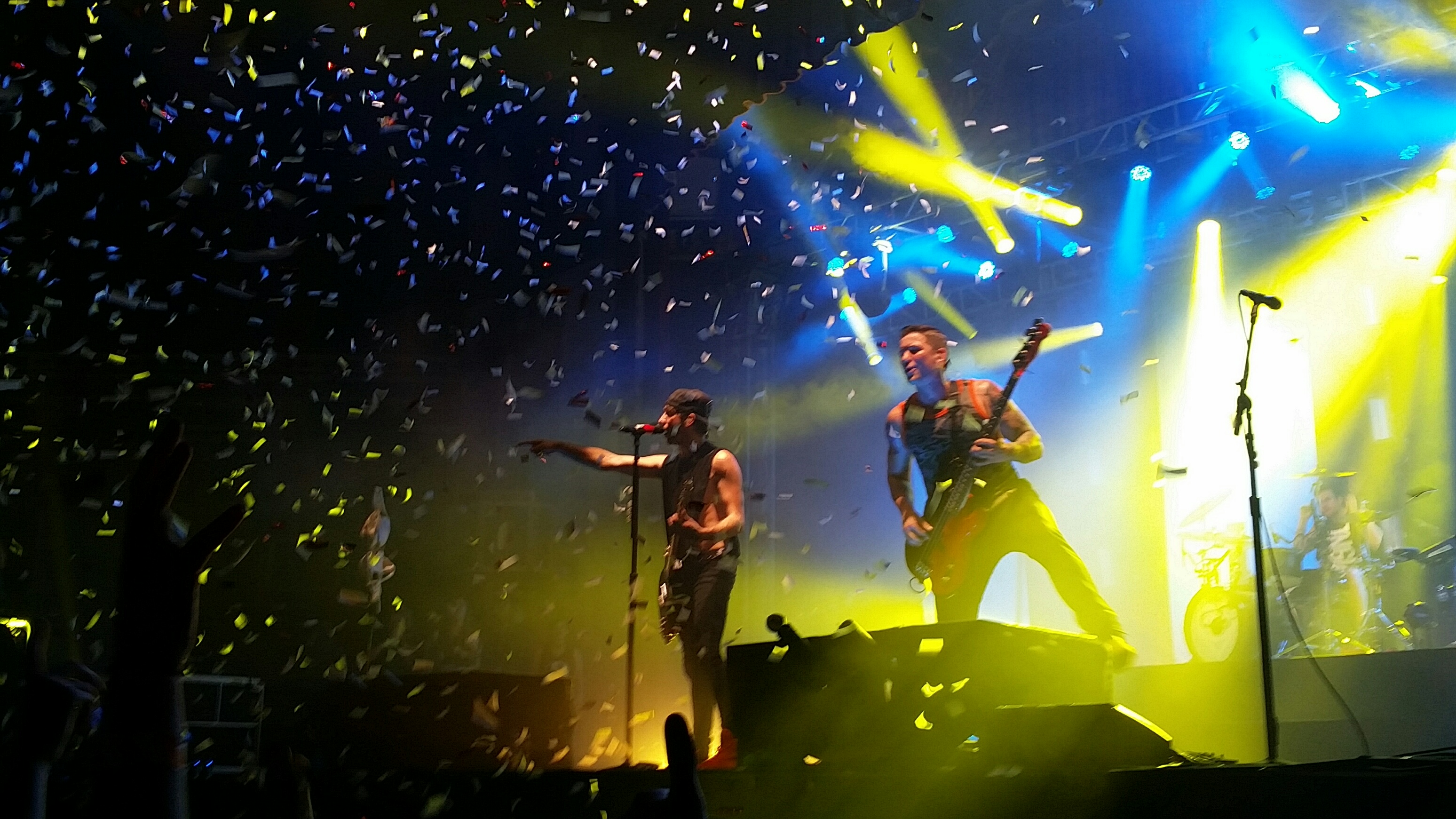
All Time Low performing in 2015

Gaskarth started playing music with bandmate Jack Barakat in eighth grade. In ninth grade, they acquired Zack Merrick and Rian Dawson, forming All Time Low in 2003. They signed to Emerald Moon Records in 2004 while still in high school and released their debut EP, "The Three Words to Remember in Dealing with the End". In 2005, they released their debut studio album The Party Scene.

In 2006 the band signed with Hopeless Records. In 2007, they released a single "Dear Maria, Count Me In" that was certified Platinum in 2015 and in 2021 it was certified 2x Multi-Platinum. They also released their second studio album, So Wrong, It's Right, in 2007. In 2009, All Time Low released their third studio album Nothing Personal which debuted number 4 on the Billboard 200 chart. In 2010 the band released two CD/DVD packages, MTV Unplugged and the documentary/live concert Straight to DVD.

In 2011, the band signed with Interscope Records and released their fourth studio album Dirty Work. In early 2012, the band re-signed with Hopeless Records and released their fifth studio album Don't Panic. On 7 April 2015, All Time Low released their sixth studio album Future Hearts which reached number 2 on Billboard Hot 200 Albums Chart with 75,000 copies sold in its first week, and number 1 in the U.K official Album Charts with 19,400 copies being sold. In 2016, Straight to DVD 2: Past Present and Future Hearts was released. This is a sequel to Straight to DVD, documenting the past four years of the band as well as another live concert. In 2017, the band released a new song entitled "Dirty Laundry" and also reveals that they had left Hopeless Records and has signed with Fueled by Ramen one year prior. On 2 June 2017 the band released its seventh studio album Last Young Renegade. In the summer of 2018, the band released two new singles, Everything Is Fine and Birthday.

In 2023, on Valentine's Day, the band released a song ‘Modern Love,’ a new anti-dating anthem from their then-upcoming album, Tell Me I'm Alive.

Gaskarth has written songs with other bands such as 5 Seconds of Summer, McBusted, and Simple Plan. He hosted the podcast Full Frontal with bandmate Jack Barakat from 2013 to 2015. Full Frontal was rebranded as Crash Test Live per an announcement via Twitter in May 2020 and transitioned to Twitch (service) as the show's live streaming platform while the show would remain available in audio-only format as well as in video format following each taping.

Gaskarth also hosted the 2015 and 2016 Alternative Press Music Awards along with bandmate Jack Barakat.

=== Simple Creatures (2019–2020) ===
On 24 January 2019, Gaskarth announced he was forming a new group with Mark Hoppus of Blink-182 called Simple Creatures. A debut song named "Drug" was released with news of an upcoming EP slated for March. A single named "Strange Love" was also released. Since 2020 the project has been on hiatus.

== Instruments ==
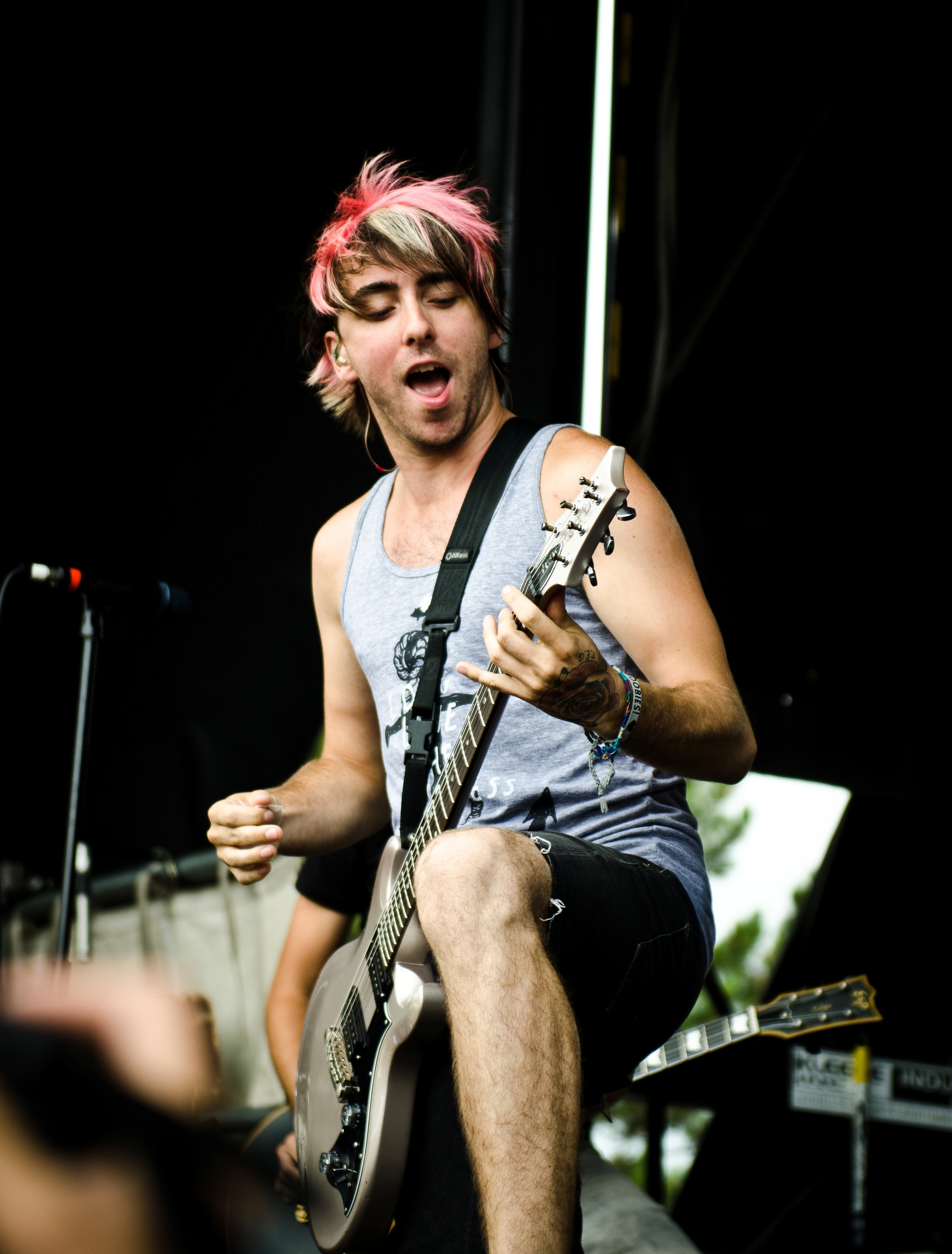
Gaskarth in 2012

During 2004–2008, Gaskarth used a variety of Gibson SG-X's. Around mid-2013, Gaskarth used a variety of custom-made Paul Reed Smith guitars, most notable the Mira. He stated in a Reddit AMA that he abandoned the instruments due to difficulties replacing parts while overseas. Gaskarth currently uses Fender guitars, most notable the Mustang 90 models, although he has been seen using Telecasters, as well as some of their acoustic models. Gaskarth has also been seen using Gibson electric guitars.

== Vocal style ==
Gaskarth has a tenor vocal style. His vocal range is F2 to G5.

== Personal life ==
Gaskarth married his long-time girlfriend Lisa Ruocco on April 9, 2016.

During the COVID-19 lockdown in 2020, Gaskarth, Jack Barakat and fellow crew members of All Time Low, started a live podcast on YouTube called Crash Test Live.

== Discography ==
=== As lead artist ===
All Time Low

List of albums, with selected details
| Title | Album details |
|---|---|
| The Party Scene | Released: 19 July 2005; Label: Emerald Moon; Formats: CD |
| Put Up or Shut Up (EP) | Released: 25 July 2006; Label: Hopeless; Formats: CD, digital download |
| So Wrong, It's Right | Released: 25 September 2007; Label: Hopeless; Formats: CD, digital download |
| Nothing Personal | Released: 7 July 2009; Label: Hopeless; Formats: CD, digital download |
| Dirty Work | Released: 6 June 2011; Label: Interscope; Formats: CD, digital download |
| Don't Panic | Released: 8 October 2012; Label: Hopeless; Formats: CD, digital download |
| Future Hearts | Released: 3 April 2015; Label: Hopeless; Formats: CD, digital download |
| Last Young Renegade | Released: 2 June 2017; Label: Fueled by Ramen; Formats: CD, digital download |
| Wake Up, Sunshine | Released: 3 April 2020; Label: Fueled by Ramen; Formats: CD, digital download |
| Tell Me I'm Alive | Released: 17 March 2023; Label: Fueled by Ramen; Formats: CD, digital download |
| Everyone's Talking! | Released: 17 October 2025; Label: Basement Noise / Photo Finish Records; Formats: CD, digital download, vinyl |

Simple Creatures

List of extended plays, with selected details
| Title | Album details |
|---|---|
| Strange Love | Released: 29 March 2019; Label: BMG; Formats: CD, digital download |
| Everything Opposite | Released: 11 October 2019; Label: BMG; Formats: CD, digital download |

=== As featured artist ===
| Song Title | Year | Album Title | Label |
|---|---|---|---|
| "Disconnect" (The Dangerous Summer featuring Alex Gaskarth) | 2007 | If You Could Only Keep Me Alive | Hopeless |
| "Don’t Wait” (Hit the Lights featuring Alex Gaskarth) | 2008 | Skip School, Start Fights | Triple Crown |
| "No One Can Touch Us” (Sing It Loud featuring Alex Gaskarth) | 2008 | Come Around | Epitaph |
| "Bitter Sweet Symphony” (Ace Enders and a Million Different People featuring The Rocket Summer, Kenny Vasoli, Craig Owens, Alex Gaskarth, Matthew Thiessen, Aaron Marsh, Mark Hoppus, and Duane Okun) | 2008 | Non-album single | Drive-Thru |
| "Freaking Me Out" (Simple Plan featuring Alex Gaskarth) | 2011 | Get Your Heart On! | Lava, Atlantic |
| "Kiss Me Again" (We Are the In Crowd featuring Alex Gaskarth) | 2012 | Best Intentions | Hopeless |
| "Telescope" (Yellowcard featuring Alex Gaskarth) | 2012 | Southern Air | Hopeless |
| "When I Found You" (Amber Pacific featuring Alex Gaskarth) | 2014 | The Turn | Digitally Sound |
| "Jaded" (One OK Rock featuring Alex Gaskarth) | 2017 | Ambitions | A-Sketch, Amuse, Inc., Fueled by Ramen |
| "Time To Fall In Love" (Lindsey Stirling featuring Alex Gaskarth) | 2017 | Warmer in the Winter | Lindseystomp, Concord |
| "Up in Flames" (Kayzo featuring Alex Gaskarth) | 2019 | Unleashed | Welcome |
| "Crashed the Wedding 2.0" (Busted Feat. All Time Low) | 2023 | Crashed the Wedding 2.0 | |

=== As songwriter ===
| Song Title | Year | Album Title | Label |
|---|---|---|---|
| "Freaking Me Out" (Simple Plan) | 2011 | Get Your Heart On! | Lava, Atlantic |
| "No Idea" (Big Time Rush) | 2011 | Elevate | Nick, Columbia |
| "Settle for Less" (Before You Exit) | 2013 | I Like That (EP) | Sony |
| "Disconnected" (5 Seconds of Summer) | 2014 | She Looks So Perfect (EP) | Capitol, Hi or Hey |
| "Kiss Me, Kiss Me", "End Up Here", "Long Way Home" (5 Seconds of Summer) | 2014 | 5 Seconds of Summer | Capitol, Hi or Hey |
| "Get Over It" (McBusted) | 2014 | McBusted | Island |
| "Broken Pieces", "Over and Out" (5 Seconds of Summer) | 2015 | She's Kinda Hot (EP) | Capitol, Hi or Hey |
| "Catch Fire" (5 Seconds of Summer) | 2015 | Sounds Good Feels Good | Capitol, Hi or Hey |
| "Slow Burn", "Hurry Up and Wait" (State Champs) | 2015 | Around the World and Back | Pure Noise |
| "Something New", "Upside Down" (Set It Off) | 2016 | Upside Down | Equal Vision |
| "Way With Words" (The Wrecks) | 2018 | Panic Vertigo (EP) | The Century Family Inc. |
| "Criminal", "The Fix Up" (State Champs) | 2018 | Living Proof | Pure Noise |
