= Blake Harnage =

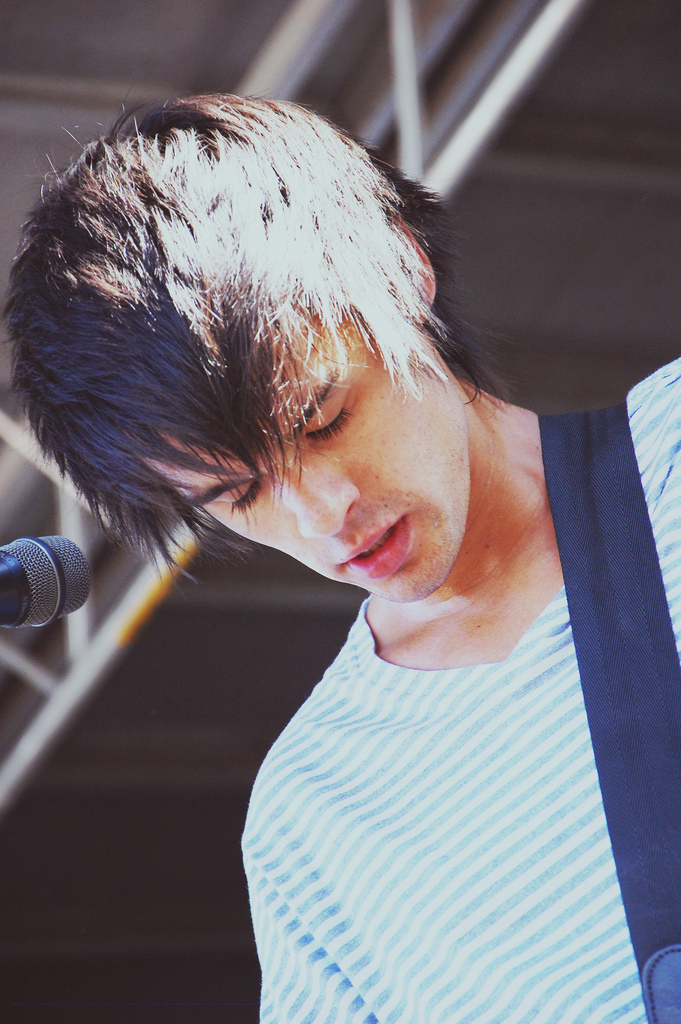
- Harnage performing at Warped Tour in 2010

Background information
- Born: Blake Preston Harnage; November 26, 1988 (age 37); Florida, United States
- Genres: Alternative rock, experimental rock, pop, film score
- Occupations: Songwriter, producer, multi-instrumentalist, composer
- Instruments: Guitar, vocals, keyboards
- Years active: 2005–present
- Label: Fueled By Ramen
- Formerly of: Versa

Blake Preston Harnage (born November 26, 1988) is an American songwriter, music producer, multi-instrumentalist and composer. He has written, produced, engineered, mixed or performed on songs for Versa, PVRIS, Hands Like Houses, All Time Low, Tate McRae, and others.

== Life and career ==
Harnage was born in Stuart, Florida. Immersed in music throughout his childhood, he has grown up under the influence of many musical styles. Starting guitar at a young age, Harnage has also received classical voice training. At age 14, Blake's first group performed locally, highlighting his blues guitar improvisation. Throughout high school, he played with various post-hardcore bands before starting VersaEmerge in 2006.

== Versa and VersaEmerge ==
In 2007, Harnage founded the experimental rock band VersaEmerge with singer Sierra Kay in Port St. Lucie, Florida. Harnage and Kusterbeck began creating music under the simplified name Versa in 2013. Departing from the band's previously energetic rock sound, Versa showcases deep electronic and atmospheric sounds.

== Producing ==
Blake Harnage has done production on many releases including VersaEmerge's 2012 release Another Atmosphere Preview EP, as well as the more recent release from Versa - Neon EP. In 2013, Harnage began work on debut album from PVRIS entitled White Noise. He and PVRIS vocalist Lynn Gunn completed the writing and recording of White Noise at his home studio in Port Saint Lucie, Florida, and at a former church-turned recording studio in Utica, New York. Harnage contributed to Hands Like Houses' 2016 album Dissonants as a writer and engineer. In 2017 Harnage produced PVRIS' sophomore album All We Know of Heaven, All We Need of Hell.

Harnage has also worked with artists such as All Time Low and Minke.

== Composing ==
In 2014, Harnage composed a piece for the independent documentary film Of Many, produced by Chelsea Clinton. Premiering at the 2014 TriBeCa Film Festival, the film examined struggles between the Jewish and Muslim communities. In addition to TriBeCa, the film was also screened at the 2014 AFI DOCS Film Festival, a special event at the United Nations and more.

== Discography ==
=== Singles ===
List of singles showing year, album, and artist
Year	Title	Artist(s)	Album	Credited as
2020	"You Broke Me First"	Tate McRae	Too Young to Be Sad	Producer and Mixing Artist
2017	"Dirty Laundry"	All Time Low	Last Young Renegade	Producer
2017	"Good Times"	All Time Low	Last Young Renegade	Producer
2017	"What's Wrong"	Pvris	All We Know of Heaven, All We Need of Hell	Producer
2017	"Heaven"	Pvris	All We Know of Heaven, All We Need of Hell	Producer
2016	"Degrees of Separation"	Hands Like Houses	Dissonants	Co-writer

=== Non-singles ===
List of non-single tracks showing year, album, and artist
Year	Title	Artist(s)	Album	Credited as
2018	"Turn"	The Wombats	Beautiful People Will Ruin Your Life	Co-writer
	"Tell Me"	Somme	Somme	Co-writer
2017	"Last Young Renegade"	All Time Low	Last Young Renegade	Producer
2017	"Nice2KnoU"	All Time Low	Last Young Renegade	Producer
2017	"Life of the Party"	All Time Low	Last Young Renegade	Producer
2017	"Nightmares"	All Time Low	Last Young Renegade	Producer
2017	"Dark Side of Your Room"	All Time Low	Last Young Renegade	Producer
2017	Ground Control" (featuring Tegan and Sara)	All Time Low	Last Young Renegade	Producer
2016	"Motion Sickness"	Hands Like Houses	Dissonants	Co-writer

=== Albums ===
List of albums featuring by Blake Harnage
Year	Album	Artist(s)	Credited	Refs.
2019	The Tearoom: March 6, 2019; Label: n/a	Minke	Producer, writer	
2017	Last Young Renegade: Released on: June 2, 2017; Label: Fueled by Ramen	All Time Low	Producer	
2017	All We Know of Heaven, All We Need of Hell: Released on: August 25, 2017; Label: Rise Records/Velocity	Pvris	Producer	
2016	Dissonants: Released on: 26 February 2016; Label: Rise Records/UNFD	Hands Like Houses	Engineer	
2015	Collide: Released:	Colleen D'Agostino	Producer	
2014	The Wolves: February 4, 2014; Label: Mau5trap	Colleen D'Agostino	Producer	
2014	White Noise: Released on: November 4, 2014; Label: Rise Records/Velocity	Pvris	Producer	
2013	Paris Acoustic EP: Released on: March 26, 2013; Label: Self-released	Pvris	Producer	

== Versa ==
=== Studio albums with Versa ===
Fixed at Zero (2010)

=== EPs with Versa ===
Year	Album
2007	Cities Built on Sand: Released as VersaEmerge: November 11, 2007; Label: Self-released
2008	Perceptions: Released as VersaEmerge: July 2, 2008; Label: Self-released
2009	VersaEmerge: Released as VersaEmerge: February 3, 2009; Label: Fueled by Ramen
2011	Live Acoustic: Released as VersaEmerge: August 23, 2011; Label: Fueled by Ramen
2012	Another Atmosphere Preview: Released as VersaEmerge: July 31, 2012; Label: Fueled by Ramen
2014	Neon: Released: January 21, 2014; Label: Self-released
