= Hallucination (disambiguation) =

A hallucination is a perception in the absence of a stimulus.

Hallucination or Hallucinations may also refer to:

== Literature ==
- "Hallucination" (short story), a 1985 science fiction short story by Isaac Asimov
- Hallucinations (book), a 2012 book by Oliver Sacks

== Computing and mathematics ==
- Hallucination (artificial intelligence), assertion by an AI that is unjustified by its training data

== Drugs ==
- Alcoholic hallucinosis
- Hallucinogen, a broad and diverse class of psychoactive drugs

== Music ==
- Hallucination Recordings, a record label
- Hallucinations (Atrocity album) (1990)
- Hallucinations (David Usher album) (2003)
- Hallucinations: Psychedelic Pop Nuggets from the WEA Vaults, a 2004 compilation album
- Hallucinations (EP), a 2019 EP by Pvris
- "Hallucination" (Regard and Years & Years song), 2022
- "Hallucination" (Sissal song), 2025
- "Hallucination", a 2024 song by Stray Kids from Hop
- "Hallucinations", a 2009 single by Angels & Airwaves from Love
- "Hallucinations", a 2019 single by Pvris from Use Me
- "Hallucinations", a bebop-era composition by Bud Powell covered by many jazz musicians
- The Halluci Nation, a Canadian electronic music group formerly known as A Tribe Called Red
