= Pvris =

American pop rock act

PVRIS
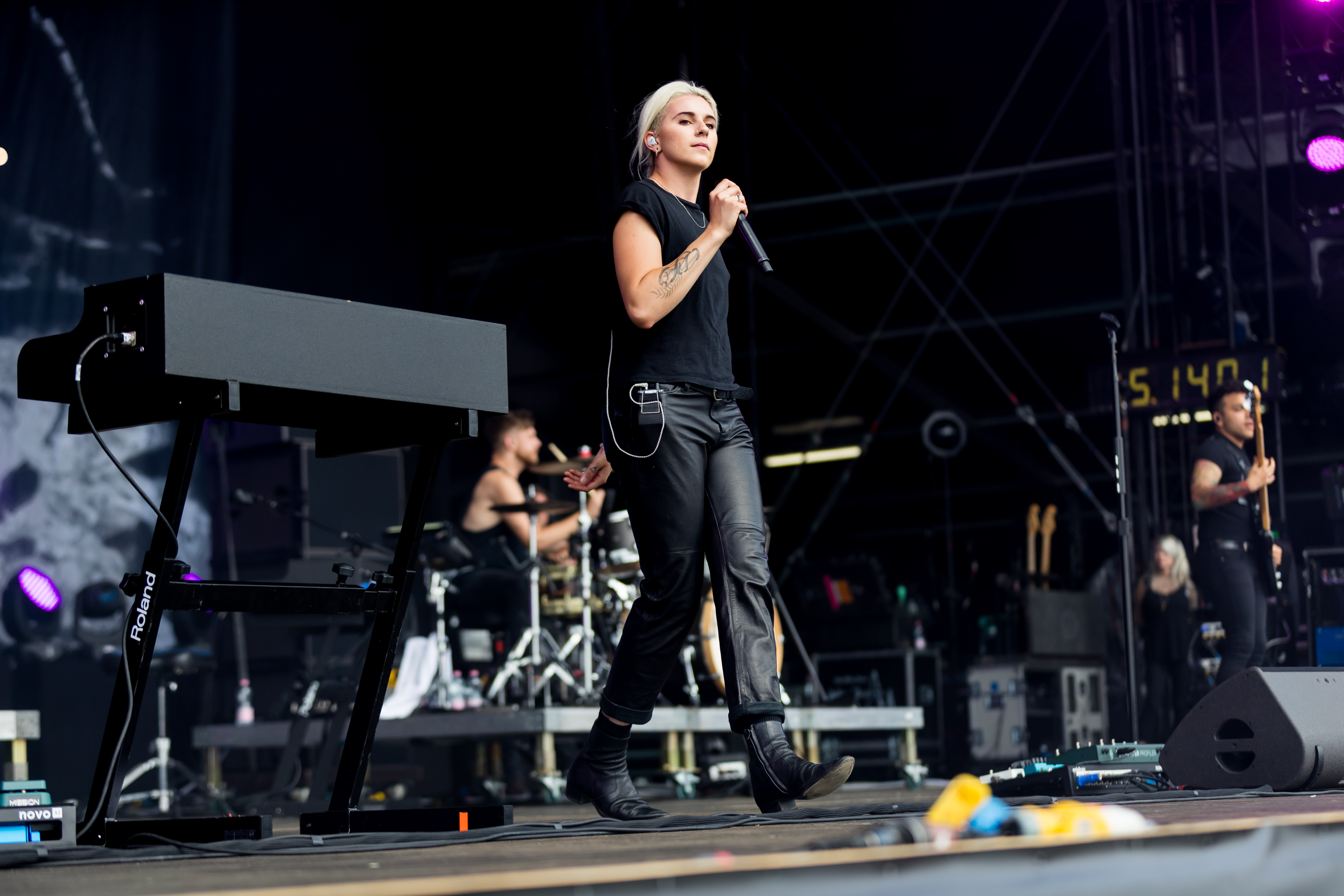
- PVRIS performing in 2018

Background information
- Also known as: Operation Guillotine (2009–2012); Paris (2012–2013)
- Origin: Lowell, Massachusetts, U.S.
- Genres: Electropop; synth-pop; alternative rock; pop rock; post-hardcore (early)
- Years active: 2009–present
- Labels: Rise; Velocity; Reprise; Warner; Hopeless
- Members: Lynn Gunn; Brian MacDonald
- Past members: Kyle Anthony; Brad Griffin; Alex Babinski
- Website: pvris.com

Pvris (pronounced "Paris" and stylized PVRIS) is an American pop rock band formed in Lowell, Massachusetts in 2012.

Pvris has released four studio LPs: White Noise (2014) featuring the hits "You and I", and "My House", All We Know of Heaven, All We Need of Hell (2017) featuring "What's Wrong", Use Me (2020) featuring "Hallucinations", and Evergreen (2023) featuring "Goddess".

== History ==
=== Formation and early releases (2009–2014) ===
The act was formed as a band in Lowell, Massachusetts, in 2009 under the name Operation Guillotine. They were originally a metalcore band, consisting of five members, with Kyle Anthony performing lead vocals. Their line-up soon changed to vocalist/guitarist Lynn Gunn (born Lyndsey Gunnulfsen), guitarist Alex Babinski, bassist Brian Macdonald, and drummer Brad Griffin. On March 26, 2013, Pvris released their self-titled EP. The sound was described as post-hardcore. They played sporadic shows through the Spring, including a mini-tour with Love, Robot.

During the summer of 2013, the band played a week on Ernie Ball's Battle of the Bands stage at Warped Tour after winning a contest. On July 18, it was announced that they had signed with Tragic Hero Records, though it was short-lived. It was also during this time, on July 26, that the band officially changed their name from 'Paris' to 'Pvris', citing legal reasons. The band went on The Rise Up Tour supporting A Skylit Drive in September and October. Shortly after the end of the tour, they parted ways with their drummer Brad Griffin, and continued as a trio. Pvris began teasing fans that they would soon be hitting the studio to write and record new material around this time. That recording process began in December when Pvris entered the studio with Blake Harnage of Versa. On February 7, 2014, they officially announced that they were a part of an Acoustic 4 Way Split with A Loss For Words, Wind in Sails and After Tonight which was set to release on April 1, 2014. Coinciding with the release of their Acoustic EP, Pvris joined A Loss For Words, Veara, City Lights, and Moms on the fifth anniversary of The Kids Can't Lose Tour from March 29, 2014, to April 13, 2014.

=== White Noise (2014–2016) ===
When the band went into the studio their sound changed drastically, incorporating pop and electronic elements into their music. Gunn claimed this incorporation was done subconsciously. In June 2014 it was announced the band had signed to Rise and Velocity. A music video was released for "St. Patrick" on June 24, and the song was also released as a single on the same day. The track peaked at number 4 on the Kerrang! Rock Chart, spending over fifteen weeks in the top 20. In an interview with The Huffington Post Gunn elaborated on the excitement that came with being able to release new music to the public. "We've been waiting over six months to release anything... It feels incredible to finally unleash it to the world. So many more people are into it than we even imagined!" The band played two weeks on the Battle of the Bands stage at Warped Tour. During their time spent on Warped Tour The Huffington Post released a second article listing them as one of "18 Artists You Need To Know Halfway Through 2014". "Lynn Gunn is a force that cannot be denied, redolently poignant in both her most excitable and serene vocalizations. The first female-led signing of Rise Records, a label that has almost implausibly made metalcore music equally accessible and desirable, the label may have just made its smartest acquisition yet."

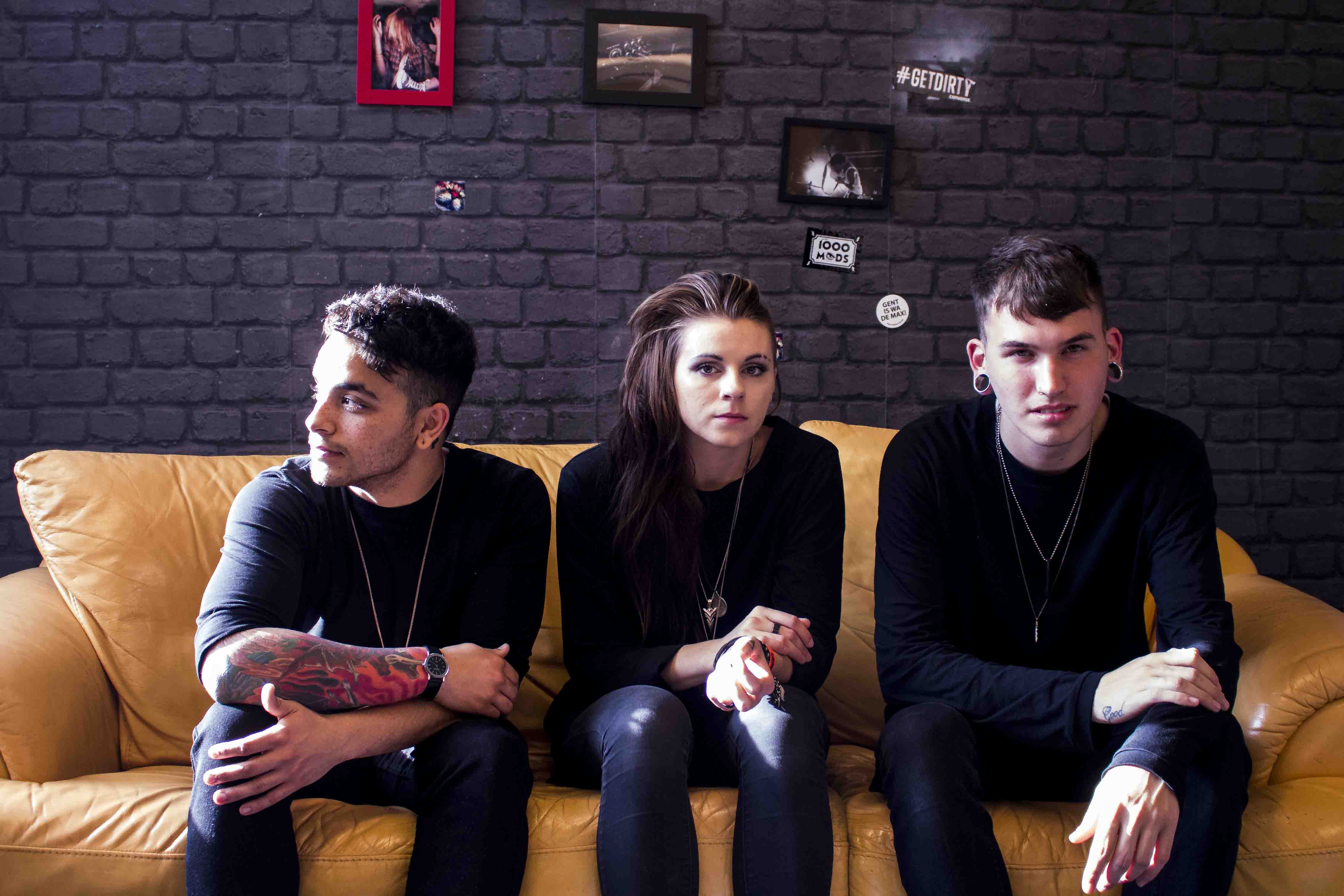
Pvris members Brian MacDonald, Lynn Gunn, and Alex Babinski in 2015

The band supported Mayday Parade in October and November on their The Honeymoon Tour. In early September, the band supported Emarosa on the Up Close and Personal tour. Pvris also joined the Ice Grills 2014 Tour in Japan from September 16, 2014, to September 21, 2014. The tour featured Lyndsey and Brian playing with A Loss For Words, State Champs, as well as Pvris providing acoustic support. On September 22, 2014, Pvris announced their debut album "White Noise" due for release on November 4, 2014. The following day, Pvris released a music video for "My House". On October 6, 2014, Pvris released "The Empty Room Sessions" of My House. On October 16, 2014, Pvris released the self-titled track "White Noise" off of their upcoming debut album. On November 10, 2014, it was announced that Pvris would be supporting Pierce the Veil and Sleeping with Sirens on the second leg of their World Tour, and Mallory Knox would also be supporting them. The tour ran from January 23 to March 4, starting in San Diego and ending in Oklahoma City. On March 25, 2015, Pvris released the official video for 'White Noise'.

On June 11, 2015, Pvris won the Relentless Kerrang! Awards 2015 for Best International Newcomer. On June 22, 2015, Pvris released their cover of "Chandelier" by Sia off Punk Goes Pop 6's deluxe edition. On July 2, 2015, Pvris released the official music video for "Holy". On July 21, 2015, Pvris released the official music video for "Fire". The following day, at the Alternative Press Music Awards, they took home the award for Breakthrough Band. The band supported Bring Me the Horizon in the U.S. in October, then supported them the following month in the UK. In February and March, the band supported Fall Out Boy on their tour of the U.S. On January 5, 2016, Pvris made their network television debut by performing "My House" and "White Noise" on Jimmy Kimmel Live!.

On February 17, 2016, the band premiered a new song, titled "You and I" on Radio 104.5. The song was released on February 22, along with a music video, and is featured on a deluxe edition of White Noise, released April 22. The deluxe album also included a stripped version of "You and I", as well as a new track "Empty".

On May 11, 2016, Pvris set out on their first American headlining tour, which wrapped up on June 10. It was announced that the band will be playing at Chicago's Lollapolooza for the first time on July 29, 2016.

=== All We Know of Heaven, All We Need of Hell (2016–2018) ===
On July 27, 2016, Lynn Gunn posted a photo on her Twitter showing 45 songs that had been written for the band's second album. Pvris played their last show of 2016 at Summer Sonic Osaka on August 21. After this they went to Utica, New York, where they recorded their second album in a record studio in a building that had previously been a church and was allegedly haunted. On February 13, 2017, Pvris confirmed on a post on their Facebook page that their second album was done being recorded. On February 17, 2017, Pvris updated all of their social media platforms with a new theme as well as a post with the Roman numerals "II XX XVII" or 2 20 17. On February 20, they announced a small European tour.

On April 30, 2017, Pvris premiered their new single "Heaven" from their upcoming album on BBC's Radio 1 Rock Show. On May 1, All We Know of Heaven, All We Need of Hell was announced for release on August 4. On June 13, Pvris premiered their latest single "What's Wrong" on Annie Mac's BBC Radio 1 show as another addition to the AWKOHAWNOH album.

Pvris released a remix of The Aces' single "Last One" on April 26, 2019.

=== Hallucinations, Warner/Reprise Records, Use Me, and Babinski's departure (2019–2021) ===
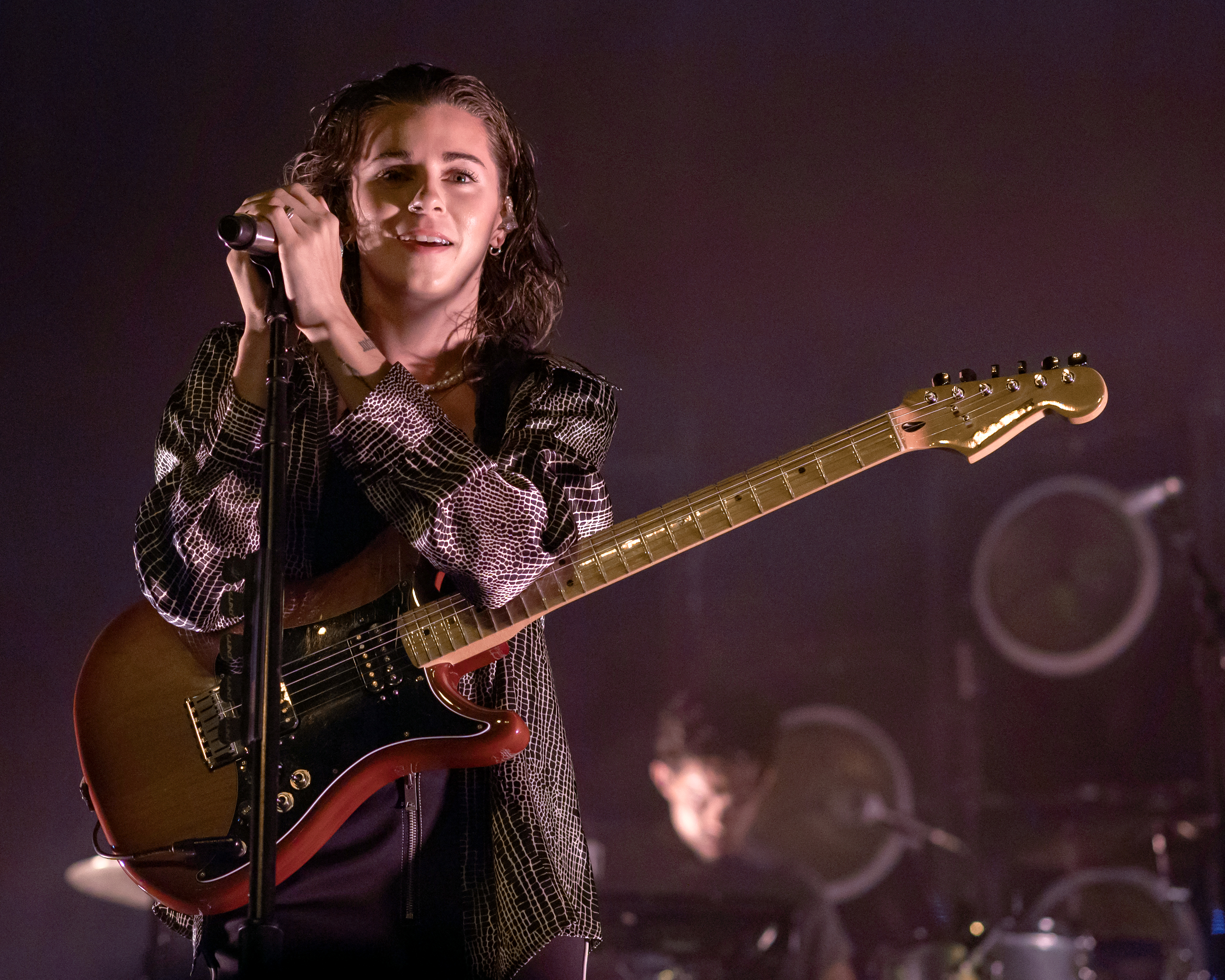
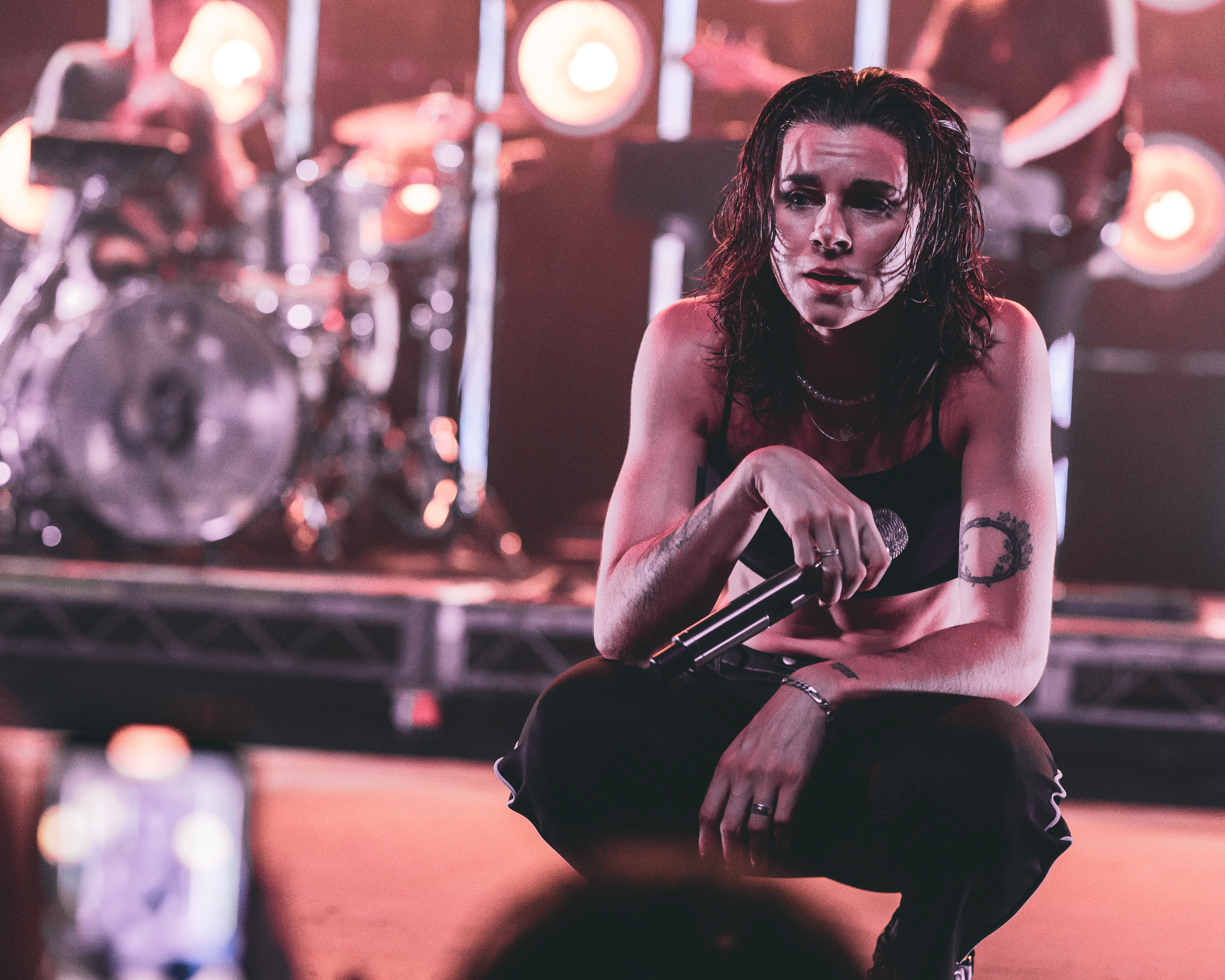
Lynn Gunn in September 2021

The band signed to Reprise/Warner Records after being with Rise, and on July 12, 2019, they released a new single "Death of Me", and an accompanying music video, as their lead single from their EP, Hallucinations. The track debuted at number 1 on the Kerrang Rock Chart.

On August 16, 2019 the band released the song/video "Hallucinations" as their second single, which saw the band continue their progression towards a more dance/EDM influenced sound. In the week leading up to the release of the single, the band sent exclusive vinyl copies of the single to their fans. Frontwoman Lynn Gunn later stated on Twitter that those vinyls were a limited edition of only 500 copies. The track saw commercial and critical success, charting for several weeks on Billboard's Alternative Airplay charts, peaking at No. 35.

On October 19, 2019, they announced on social media that a five-track EP, Hallucinations, would be released on October 25, 2019. On January 8, 2020 it was announced that they would join Halsey on her Manic World Tour, which ended up being postponed indefinitely due to COVID-19.

On March 4, 2020, through some teasing links via their social media channels, they announced their third album, Use Me. On March 4, 2020 the band released "Dead Weight" as the first single from Use Me, and announced a May 1 release date for the album. "Dead Weight" premiered on Annie Mac's BBC Radio 1 show as the "Hottest Record in the World". K. Flay collaborated on the single, which was described as dark pop. The music video for "Dead Weight" was filmed in Milan, Italy. On April 8, 2020, the band announced that the release of Use Me had been delayed to July 10, 2020, and on July 2 the band announced a further delay to August 28, 2020. A deluxe edition of the album was released on October 22, 2020.

On August 26, 2020, the band announced that guitarist Alex Babinski was no longer in the band due to sexual misconduct allegations. Babinski released a statement shortly after, strongly denying the allegations while stating he would take legal action, but stated that he understood the decision made by Gunn and MacDonald. Said accusations were later dropped in 2023 when the accuser recanted their statement; neither Gunn or MacDonald have publicly commented further.

=== Evergreen (2022–present) ===
On October 10, 2022, Pvris began teasing their next two singles on Twitter. Each day leading up to the songs' release on October 20, 2022, the band has posted a link to pre-save the singles on different music platforms. The new tracks were accompanied by a short film directed by Jax Anderson and Lynn Gunn, which premiered on Youtube.

On March 30, 2023, Pvris announced that their fourth album Evergreen would be released on July 14, 2023.

On October 18, 2024, Pvris released their fourth EP F.I.L.T.H..

== Musical style ==
AllMusic biographer wrote in 2015 that the group "blend[s] dreamy electronica with dark, beat-heavy rock". Rob Sayce of Rock Sound described their sound as a combined mixture of "dark electro-pop and stadium-sized rock". Metro described them as an alternative rock act that fused "electro-pop backdrops with rhythm-driven dark rock music". Their debut EP has been described as post-hardcore. White Noise has been described as electropop, pop, post-hardcore, psychedelic, and synth-pop. Their 2019 EP Hallucinations has been described as EDM, alternative rock, alt-pop, pop rock, electronic rock, and synth-pop.

== Band members ==
Current

- Lynn Gunn – vocals, rhythm guitar, keyboards, piano, synthesizers, programming (2009–present), drums (2013–present), lead guitar (2020–present), bass (2023–present)
- Brian MacDonald – bass, keyboards (full time: 2009–2023), (touring: 2023–present)

Former

- Kyle Anthony – unclean vocals (2009–2012)
- Brad Griffin – drums, backing vocals (2009–2013)
- Alex Babinski – lead guitar, keyboards (2009–2020)

Touring

- Denny Agosto – drums (2020–present)
- Justin Nace – drums (2014–2020)

== Discography ==
=== Studio albums ===
List of studio albums
Title	Album details	Peak chart positions				Sales	Certifications (sales threshold)
Title	Album details	US	US Alt.	AUS	UK	Sales	Certifications (sales threshold)
White Noise	Released: November 4, 2014; Label: Rise (RISE 249-2); Format: CD, LP, cassette, digital download	88	6	—	55	UK: 60,000; US: 58,000	BPI: Gold
All We Know of Heaven, All We Need of Hell	Released: August 25, 2017; Label: Rise; Format: CD, LP, cassette, digital download, streaming	41	3	12	4		
Use Me	Released: August 28, 2020; Label: Warner; Format: CD, LP, cassette, digital download, streaming	155	—	36	14		
Evergreen	Released: July 14, 2023; Label: Hopeless; Format: CD, LP, cassette, digital download, streaming	—	—	—	25		

=== Extended plays ===
List of extended plays
Title	Extended play details
Paris	Released: March 26, 2013; Label: Self-released; Format: CD, DL
Acoustic	Released: April 1, 2014; Label: Self-released; Format: CS, DL, 10" vinyl
Hallucinations	Released: October 25, 2019; Label: Reprise, Warner; Format: CD, CS, DL, LP
F.I.L.T.H.	Released: October 18, 2024; Label: Hopeless; Format: CD, CS, DL, LP

=== Singles ===
List of singles, showing year released and album name
Title	Year	Peak chart positions			Album
Title	Year	US Alt.	US Rock	US Hard Digi.	Album
"St. Patrick"	2014	—	—	—	White Noise
"My House"	2014	—	—	—	White Noise
"White Noise"	2014	—	—	—	White Noise
"Holy"	2015	—	—	—	White Noise
"Fire"	2015	—	—	—	White Noise
"You and I"	2016	40	37	—	White Noise
"Heaven"	2017	—	—	21	All We Know of Heaven, All We Need of Hell
"What's Wrong"	2017	—	—	—	All We Know of Heaven, All We Need of Hell
"Anyone Else"	2017	—	—	—	All We Know of Heaven, All We Need of Hell
"Same Soul"	2017	—	—	—	All We Know of Heaven, All We Need of Hell
"Death of Me"	2019	—	—	—	Hallucinations & Use Me
"Hallucinations"	2019	35	25	—	Hallucinations & Use Me
"Old Wounds"	2019	—	—	—	Hallucinations & Use Me
"Dead Weight"	2020	—	—	—	Use Me
"Gimme a Minute"	2020	—	—	—	Use Me
"Thank You" (featuring Raye)	2020	—	—	—	Use Me
"Sacrificial" (with Rezz)	2021	—	—	—	Spiral
"Monster"	2021	—	—	—	Non-album singles
"My Way"	2021	—	—	—	Non-album singles
"Animal"	2022	—	—	—	Evergreen
"Anywhere but Here"	2022	—	—	—	Evergreen
"Goddess"	2023	—	—	—	Evergreen
"Good Enemy"	2023	—	—	—	Evergreen
"Love Is a…"	2023	—	—	—	Evergreen
"Evergreen"	2023	—	—	—	Evergreen
"Burn the Witch" (with Tommy Genesis and Alice Longyu Gao)	2024	—	—	—	F.I.L.T.H
"Girl$" (with Stand Atlantic and Bruses)	2024	—	—	—	Was Here
"Oil & Water"	2024	—	—	—	F.I.L.T.H
"The Blob" (with Lights)	2024	—	—	—	F.I.L.T.H

=== Promotional singles ===
List of promotional singles, showing year released and album name
Title	Year	Album
"Half"	2017	All We Know of Heaven, All We Need of Hell
"Winter"	2017	All We Know of Heaven, All We Need of Hell

== Other charted songs ==
List of singles, with selected chart positions, showing year released, and album name
Title	Year	Peak chart positions	Album
Title	Year	US Rock	Album
"In These Walls (My House)" Machine Gun Kelly (featuring Pvris)	2022	49	Lockdown Sessions

=== Other songs ===
List of other songs, showing year released and album name
Title	Year	Album
"Gemini" (featuring Kyle Anthony)	2012	non-album song
"Rain" (Love, Robot featuring Pvris)	2013	non-album song
"Follow"	2013	non-album song
"Chandelier"	2014	Punk Goes Pop Vol. 6
"Obsessed" (TBMA featuring Pvris)	2014	non-album song
"Lose Myself" (Seven Lions featuring Pvris)	2015	The Throes of Winter
"Fire That Burns" (Circa Waves featuring Pvris)	2017	Different Creatures
"Are You Ten Years Ago"	2017	The Con X: Covers
"Disappear" (Tonight Alive featuring Pvris)	2018	Underworld
"Hallucinations" (Acoustic)	2020	non-album song
"alive" (guardin featuring Pvris)	2020	non-album song
"Numb" (Kiiara featuring DeathbyRomy and Pvris)	2020	lil kiiwi
"Can't Get Me High" (Jax Anderson featuring Pvris)	2021	Songs For Every Condition
"Burn It All Down" (with League of Legends)	2021	non-album song
"Wicked" (with Milkblood)	2022	Dream Slow
"Maybe You Saved Me"	2022	Apocalypse Whenever (Deluxe Edition)
"Vultures" (Misterwives featuring Pvris)	2024	Nosebleeds: Encore

=== Music videos ===
Title	Year	Director	Ref.
"The Heartless"(featuring Josh Herzer)	2012		
"St. Patrick"	2014	Raúl Gonzo	
"St. Patrick" (The Empty Room Sessions)	2014	Alexa San Roman/Ego Alley Productions	
"My House"	2014	Raúl Gonzo	
"My House" (The Empty Room Sessions)	2014	Alexa San Roman/Ego Alley Productions	
"White Noise" (The Empty Room Sessions)	2014	Alexa San Roman/Ego Alley Productions	
"Eyelids" (The Empty Room Sessions)	2014		
"Holy" (The Empty Room Sessions)	2015	Alexa San Roman	
"White Noise"	2015	Raúl Gonzo	
"Chandelier"	2015	Alexa San Roman	
"Holy"	2015	Raúl Gonzo	
"Fire"	2015	Raúl Gonzo	
"Smoke"	2016	Raúl Gonzo	
"Ghosts/Let Them In"	2016	Raúl Gonzo	
"Eyelids"	2016	Raúl Gonzo	
"Mirrors"	2016	Raúl Gonzo	
"You And I"	2016	Raúl Gonzo	
"All We Know of Heaven, All We Need of Hell"	2017	Raúl Gonzo and Lyndsey Gunnulfsen	
"Heaven"	2017	Raúl Gonzo and Lyndsey Gunnulfsen	
"What's Wrong"	2017	Raúl Gonzo and Lyndsey Gunnulfsen	
"Half (Visualette)"	2017	Raúl Gonzo and Lyndsey Gunnulfsen	
"Winter (Visualette)"	2017	Raúl Gonzo and Lyndsey Gunnulfsen	
"Anyone Else"	2017	Raúl Gonzo and Lyndsey Gunnulfsen	
"Death of Me"	2019	Katharine White	
"Hallucinations"	2019	YHELLOW	
"Old Wounds"	2019	YHELLOW	
"Dead Weight"	2020	Lorenzo Diego Carrera	
"Gimme a Minute"	2020	Lorenzo Diego Carrera	
"Use Me" (featuring 070 Shake)	2020	Griffin Stoddard	
"Monster"	2021	Katharine White	
"My Way"	2021	Katharine White	
"Anywhere But Here"/"Animal"	2022	Jax Anderson and Lyndsey Gunnulfsen	
"Goddess"	2023	Jax Anderson and Lyndsey Gunnulfsen	
"I Don't Wanna Do This Anymore"	2023	Lyndsey Gunnulfsen and Jax Anderson	
"Burn the Witch"	2024	Cole Santiago	

== Awards and nominations ==
Rock Sound Awards

Year	Recipient/work	Award	Result	Ref.
2017	Pvris	Artist of the Year	Won	
2018	Lynn Gunn	Rock Sound Icon	Won	

Alternative Press Music Awards

Year	Recipient/work	Award	Result	Ref.
2015	Pvris	Breakthrough Band	Won	

Boston Music Awards

Year	Recipient/work	Award	Result	Ref.
2017	Pvris	Artist of the Year	Won	
2016	Pvris	Artist of the Year	Won	

AltRock Awards

Year	Recipient/work	Award	Result	Ref.
2018	Pvris (with Muse and Thirty Seconds to Mars)	Tour of the Year	Won	
2018	Pvris (with Muse and Thirty Seconds to Mars)	Best Online Performance	Nominated	

Kerrang! Awards

Year	Recipient/work	Award	Result	Ref.
2015	Pvris	Best International Newcomer	Won	
