= Let Them In =

Let Them In may refer to:

- Let Them In (song), a 2014 song by American band Pvris
- Let 'Em In, a 1976 song by British-American rock band Wings
- Let Them In: The Case for Open Borders, a 2008 book by Wall Street Journal columnist Jason L. Riley
