= F.I.L.T.H. =

EP by Pvris
- Released: October 18, 2024
- Length: 13:49
- Label: Hopeless
- Producer: Lynn Gunn

Pvris chronology
Evergreen (2023)	F.I.L.T.H. (2024)

Singles from F.I.L.T.H.
- 1. "Burn the Witch" Released: February 16, 2024; 2. "Oil & Water" Released: April 18, 2024; 3. "The Blob" Released: June 21, 2024

F.I.L.T.H. is the fourth extended play by American rock band Pvris. It was released on October 18, 2024 through Hopeless Records and follows their previous album Evergreen. The EP features appearances from Tommy Genesis, Alice Longyu Gao, Sizzy Rocket, Uffie, Mothica, and Lights and was preceded by the singles "Burn the Witch", "Oil & Water", and "The Blob".

== Background and composition ==
F.I.L.T.H. was written and produced by Lynn Gunn and mixed and mastered by Kayla Reagan, with the entire project being concepted and created by women and non-binary artists. She further described the project in a statement:

F.I.L.T.H. is a self-produced collaborative music project between friends and past tour-mates. I wanted to make a small project where some other female/non-binary artists could hop into the world of Pvris and vice versa, have as much control over the lyrics and music as they wanted and simply just have fun making some music together! Everyone had free rein to write what they wanted and add their own voice, figuratively and literally, to each track.

— Lynn Gunn

== Track listing ==
All tracks are written and produced by Lyndsey Gunnulfsen. Additional writers are included below.

F.I.L.T.H. track listing
No.	Title	Writer(s)	Length
1.	"Burn the Witch" (with Tommy Genesis and Alice Longyu Gao)	Genesis Mohanraj; Alice Longyu Gao; Rachel Kanner	2:55
2.	"F.I.L.T.H." (with Sizzy Rocket and Uffie)	Sabrina Bernstein; Anna-Catherine Hartley	2:36
3.	"Reptilian" (with Mothica)	McKenzie Ellis; Bernstein; Hartley	2:27
4.	"The Blob" (with Lights)	Valerie Poxleitner	2:22
5.	"Oil & Water"	Kanner	3:29
Total length:			13:49

- All song titles are stylized in uppercase letters.
