= Karina Eibatova =

Painter

- Born: 1988 (age 37–38); Leningrad, USSR
- Education: Gerlesborg School of Fine Art, Tanum, Sweden; Academy of Fine Arts Vienna, Vienna, Austria; Central Saint Martins, London, England; Tokyo Zokei University, Tokyo, Japan
- Known for: Watercolor; graphic design; mural
- Movement: Surrealism, psychedelia

Karina Eibatova (a.k.a. Eika; born 1988 in Leningrad, USSR) is a watercolor painter, illustrator, muralist, typographer, pencil artist, and videographer who specializes in landscape art. Her artwork frequently depicts natural objects and phenomena, such as minerals and animals, as well as scenes depicting the universe. Eibatova has contributed artwork to album covers and layouts, exhibition spaces, magazines, and hotel murals.

== Early life and education ==
Eibatova was born in 1988 in Leningrad.

In 2006, she, along with Egor Kraft, Petr Davydtchenko, and Lesha Galkin, formed the art collective Dopludo in Saint Petersburg. The collective's name was derived from a phonetic rendering of "deux plus deux" (French for "two plus two"), and alludes to the mathematical absurdity of 2+2=5. Dopludo habitually hangs sign of black text against white background in public spaces, often posing messages expressing social or philosophical curiosity. One piece of art was "Secret of Happiness": a white banner with black text hung upon the side of a building, reading, "The secret of happiness is..." The rest of the sentence is obscured by the sign being strategically torn off.

Receiving her initial art education in Saint Petersburg, at age 19 she branched out to Northern Sweden where she studied at the Gerlesborg School of Fine Art. She subsequently studied in Moscow, and ended up at the Academy of Fine Arts in Vienna by 2013. She has also studied at Tokyo Zokei University.

== Work ==
Eibatova's artwork mainly involves the use of pencil, watercolor, and Photoshop. She specializes in organic, natural matter, especially from environments such as forests, jungles, or space. Her work is often not a literal interpretation of nature, and features surreal entities such as, for example, duck-billed koalas or zebra-striped rhinos. Eibatova's animals have been described by Bill Rodgers of Cfile Daily as "alien, but not radically alien". Eibatova has expressed a hesitancy depicting human-made subject matter; regarding drawing or painting people, she stated, "It was kind of taboo for many years, but I’m starting to think I might change my mind."

Eibatova added illustrations to the cover and other pages of the 5th issue of Berlin-based I Love You Magazine, released for Fall and Winter of 2010. Eibatova's work was placed against a photograph of actress Paz de la Huerta. Going with the princess theme of the issue, she created a princess bride, two friends of the bride, and a groom. The bride and friends were flowers with human qualities, while the groom was a bee, in reference to pollination. The princess bride was named Princess Pionia Lactiflora.

In 2012, Eibatova released "Floral Anthem", a video accompanied with three songs by Washed Out. The piece was previously exhibited without sound in 2010 and 2011. The video depicts a woman taking flowers from her mouth and placing them all over her face and neck until her head is fully obscured.

Around 2014, Eibatova lent multiple avian drawings to the Aves edition of Bicycle cards, created and printed by LUX Playing Cards.

Eibatova was one of 32 artists featured in Psychedelic, a compilation book of psychedelic art curated by Hannah Stouffer.

A mural of her work, titled "Magical Jungles", was installed in the Casa Cook Hotel in 2016. For the work, she collaborated with design agency Lambs & Lions, as well as interior designer Annabel Kutucu and architect Vana Pernariv.

== Selected works ==
- 2009: "Life in the Alphabet", pencil on paper, typography
- 2010: album artwork and layout for Fixed at Zero by VersaEmerge
- 2010: "Captured Dreams", installation with pillows (with Dopludo)
- 2010-2012: "Floral Anthem", video
- c. 2012: Imagine, pencil series
- c. 2012: All You Need is Universe, watercolor series
- March 2012: Vincci Bit Hotel mural; Barcelona, Spain (with Dopludo)
- 2014: Mineral Admiration, watercolor series
- 2016: "Magical Jungles", mural in Casa Cook Hotel in Rhodes, Greece
- 2018: Mural in Dwell Hotel; Colombo, Sri Lanka
- 2020: "Clean the Sea", watercolor on paper

== Exhibitions ==
- 2010: Moscow International Biennale for Young Art; "Qui Vive?"
- July 2 – August 26, 2011: "Impulse"; Aando Fine Art Gallery; Berlin, Germany
- April 26 – May 13, 2014: Group show and book launch for Psychedelic by Juxtapoz; The Well; Los Angeles
