= White Noise (Pvris album) =

Studio album by Pvris
- Released: November 4, 2014
- Recorded: 2014
- Genre: Electropop; pop; alternative rock; pop rock; synth-pop; post-hardcore
- Length: 40:16
- Label: Rise; Velocity
- Producer: Blake Harnage

Pvris chronology
Acoustic (2014)	White Noise (2014)	All We Know of Heaven, All We Need of Hell (2017)

Singles from White Noise
- 1. "St. Patrick" Released: June 24, 2014; 2. "My House" Released: September 22, 2014; 3. "White Noise" Released: October 30, 2014; 4. "Holy" Released: July 3, 2015; 5. "Fire" Released: July 21, 2015; 6. "You and I" Released: February 22, 2016

White Noise is the debut studio album by American rock band Pvris. Pvris formed as a five-piece metalcore band in Lowell, Massachusetts in 2012. Following the band becoming a four-piece of vocalist/guitarist Lyndsey Gunnulfsen, guitarist Alex Babinski, bassist Brian MacDonald and drummer Brad Griffin, the group's sound changed. Bringing pop and electronic elements into their music, the band released a self-titled EP. After winning a contest, the band played a week on Warped Tour; following this, Griffin left the band. The group signed with Rise and Velocity Records in June 2014. White Noise was recorded with producer Blake Harnage. Harnage would help co-write several songs on the album with Gunnulfsen; Sierra Kusterbeck helped co-write a few songs with Harnage and Gunnulfsen.

"St. Patrick" was released as a single in June 2014. In September, a music video was released for "My House". A month later, the title track was made available for streaming. White Noise was released in November through Rise and Velocity. Receiving positive reviews, the album charted in the top 100 in the U.S., and in the top 200 in the UK. It also charted in the top 20 on several Billboard charts. "My House", "St. Patrick" and "Fire" all charted in the top 20 of the Independent Singles Breakers Chart in the UK. The album ranked on several publications' end-of-the-year lists. In March 2015, a music video was released for the title track. Outside of a supporting tour in the UK, the band announced a couple of headlining dates that sold out within seconds. In early July, a music video was released for "Holy", and later that month, a music video was released for "Fire".

On March 14, 2025, a ten year anniversary edition of the album was released including remixes of some songs.

== Background ==
Pvris formed in Lowell, Massachusetts in late 2012 under the name Operation Guillotine. They were originally a metalcore band, consisting of five members, one of which did screaming vocals. Their line-up soon changed to vocalist/guitarist Lyndsey Gunnulfsen, guitarist Alex Babinski, bassist Brian MacDonald and drummer Brad Griffin. Babinski had previously been in I Am the Fallen. When the band went into the studio their sound changed drastically, incorporating pop and electronic elements into their music. Gunnulfsen claimed this incorporation was done subconsciously. In March 2013 the band released a self-titled EP. Later that year, the band played a week on Ernie Ball's Battle of the Bands stage at Warped Tour after winning a contest. Towards the end of summer, Griffin left the band. The band went on The Rise Up Tour supporting A Skylit Drive in September and October.

== Recording ==
Prior to entering the studio, Gunnulfsen met Harnage at a Versa show. She asked him for pointers on production. He "first got me into making electronic music", according to Gunnulfsen. Previously, she was "afraid" of the band's more electronic side. She also feared it was "too out-of-the-box", potentially out-casting them from the music scene. Pvris began recording material with Harnage producing the proceedings. He helped teach the band "not give a shit what anybody thought", according to Gunnulfsen. For one week in the studio, Harnage and Gunnulfsen were sifting through demos and deciding which of the material to work on. The group had 30 demos to work with. The demos were either "rock-based" or "weird and electronic". Harnage and Gunnulfsen went with the latter, building upon them. These would be the basis for what would become White Noise.

Harnage worked nocturnally, resulting in the band waking up at 3PM and working until 8AM or 9AM. Gunnulfsen later called the process "fun" as she felt it got the "best creativity out of us". On the album, Chris Kamrada plays drums, which were engineered by Maika Maile. Harnage and Kusterbeck provide backing vocals to several of the songs. Harnage also played synths, additional guitar and helped with programming. Programming was also done by Gunnulfsen. Harnage was assisted by David Cook in engineering the album. Andrew Eliot and Chris Curran provided additional editing. Jeff Juliano mixed the album, while Chris Athens mastered it. Reuven Amiel engineered the drums on "You and I", which were edited by Anthony Reeder.

== Composition ==
Pvris planned to call the album Haunt or have it self-titled, however they were quite indecisive. Eventually they agreed on naming it after one of the songs, "White Noise". All of the material that features on White Noise was written by Lyndsey Gunnulfsen and producer Blake Harnage of VERSA, with the exception of "Holy", "Fire" and "Eyelids", which were written by Gunnulfsen, Harnage and Sierra Kusterbeck. Gunnulfsen wrote the songs while she was "in a very dark place in my mind". Compared to the band's previous output, Gunnulfsen said that White Noise "is very different from what a lot of people were expecting but in the best way". She explained that the album's sound was "rock mixed with electronic/pop kind of stuff", resulting in "a lot of different vibes throughout the album." Gunnulfsen was inspired by Saosin, Circa Survive, Ellie Goulding, Rihanna, and The Weeknd. Gavin Lloyd of Classic Rock wrote that the album featured "infectious rock" done by the likes of Paramore and We Are the In Crowd, and "dark electro-pop" performed by artists such as Purity Ring and Banks. Natasha Van Duser of Inked compared the "steady bass lines, groovy backbeats, and melodic vocals" to the likes of Taylor Swift's 1989 (2014).

The lyrics for the album were written in October 2013, when Gunnulfsen was highly inspired by ghosts and spirits. These same two items–ghosts and spirits–would be incorporated into the Gunnulfsen's lyrics. "St. Patrick" was written in the fall of 2013, during a day-off from tour; a demo of it was recorded within two hours. The song is about Gunnulfsen's girlfriend, who helped her during a rough time in her life. Gunnulfsen didn't think the band would record it; she thought it was "too poppy." "My House" is about a poltergeist and is "also a metaphor for a person, being like, 'Go away.'" "Holy", according to Gunnulfsen, is "one of the most personal and honest songs" featured on the album. The song is about a person who had a problem with Gunnulfsen being gay. "White Noise" came about as a spur of the moment idea. Gunnulfsen had previous noticed something on Tumblr about Poltergeist and "I was like, 'Oh! That's perfect'". The demo of the song was under the working title "White Boiz" and featured a different drum beat in the chorus. The group replaced this different drum beat with a "half-time, really dragging beat" and experimented with an EBow. "Fire" was written after "a very intense" encounter with a person, resulting in the song coming across as "very raw and real", according to Gunnulfsen.

== Release ==
=== Original release and touring ===
In June 2014 prior to playing two weeks on the Battle of the Bands stage at Warped Tour, Pvris signed to Rise and Velocity Records. The band were originally signed to a different record label, but Kellin Quinn of Sleeping with Sirens heard the group's material and claimed he would "get you a deal with Rise." A music video was released for "St. Patrick" on June 24, which was directed by Raul Gonzo. The song was released as a single on the same day. In early September, the band supported Emarosa on the Up Close and Personal tour. On September 22, the band announced their debut album, White Noise, for release. The track listing and art work was revealed as well. A day later, a music video was released for "My House", which was directed by Gonzo. The video features the band walking around a house, before they start swimming in a dark swimming pool. The pool scenes were filmed over three–four hours in Northern California in March.

The band supported Mayday Parade in October and November on their The Honeymoon Tour. On October 16, the title track was made available for streaming. On October 30, White Noise was made available for streaming. The album was released on November 4 through Rise and Velocity. On the same day, "St. Patrick" was released to Modern rock radio stations. On January 10, 2015 a 7" vinyl was released featuring "St. Patrick" and an acoustic version of the song as the B-side. Between January and March, the band supported Pierce the Veil and Sleeping with Sirens on their co-headlining tour across the U.S. On March 25, a music video was released for "White Noise", which was directed by Gonzo. For the video, Gonzo and Gunnulfsen agreed that the video should pay homage to the film Poltergeist. The band toured the UK in April supporting Lower Than Atlantis. Around this tour, the band announced two headlining dates, both of which sold out in seconds. The band was supported by Light You Up and Twin Wild for these two dates.

The band went on the 2015 edition of Warped Tour. On July 2, 2015 a music video was released for "Holy", which was directed by Gonzo. On July 21, a music video was released for "Fire". The band supported Circa Survive in Australia in September. The band supported Bring Me the Horizon in the U.S. in October, then supported them the following month in the UK after replacing Beartooth. In January 2016, the band supported All Time Low and One Ok Rock in Japan on the One Thousand Miles Tour. On February 10, a music video was released for "Smoke", directed by Gonzo. Two days later, a double music video was released for the songs "Ghost" and "Let Them In", which was also directed by Gonzo. On February 16, a music video was released for "Eyelids", directed by Gonzo. Four days later, a music video was released for "Mirrors".

=== Reissue and further touring ===
On February 17, 2016, the band premiered a new song, titled "You and I" on Radio 104.5. On February 22, it was released as a single. On the same day, a music video was released for song, directed by Gonzo. On the same day, a deluxe edition of White Noise was announced for release on April 22. It features two new tracks, "You and I" and "Empty", as well as a stripped-down version of "You and I". It also includes a DVD. In February and March, the band are set to support Fall Out Boy on their tour of the U.S. In April, the band are set to go on their first headlining tour in the UK, with support from K.Flay, Bones and Alvarez Kings. Prior to the tour, many of the dates sold out then upgraded to bigger venues. In November, the group supported Simple Plan on their tour of Canada.

== Critical reception ==
Professional ratings
Aggregate scores
Source	Rating
Metacritic	88/100
Review scores
Source	Rating
AllMusic	3.5/5 stars
Alternative Press	3.5/5 stars
idobi	9/10
Kerrang!	5/5 stars
Rock Sound	7/10

White Noise has received positive reviews. On review aggregator Metacritic, the album has a weighted average of 88 out of 100 based on 4 reviews, indicating "universal acclaim". Reviewing the album for Alternative Press, Brian Kraus called "St. Patrick" "an obvious single choice". Kraus also praised "My House" and "Holy". Aside from "a few slip-ups", naming "Eyelids" in the process, he said the album was "a shiny debut from a band we are excited to watch improve." Eleanor Grace of idobi elements of the band's previous post-hardcore sound can be found in traces across the album. At the same time, it was mixed with the band's pop sensibilities, resulting in a sound that is both "fresh and familiar." Grace noted that the songs' hooks were "catchy enough for top 40 radio" while at the same time having "an edge and heavy influence", making them "a better fit for Rise Records than Ryan Seacrest." Rock Sound reviewer Andy Biddulph mentioned that while "St. Patrick" was "the best and worst thing" the group have done, the remainder of the album fails to stand up to the song. The "varying quality" of the tracks make for an "enthralling and frustrating listen."

The album was included at number two on idobi's top ten albums of 2014 list, number 12 on Rock Sound's top 50 albums of 2014 list, and number 33 on Kerrang!'s "The Top 50 Rock Albums Of 2014" list. The music video for "St. Patrick" was nominated for Best Music Video at the 2015 Alternative Press Music Awards.

== Commercial performance ==
White Noise charted at number 88 on the Billboard 200 in the U.S. It also charted in the top 20 on several Billboard charts. The album initially charted at number 199 in the UK on the chart dated 14 November 2014. It re-entered at number 96 on the chart dated between 31 July and 6 August 2015. It would later peak at number 87 on the chart dated between 14 August and 20 August 2015. The album entered the UK Independent Albums chart at number 45 on the chart dated between 9 November and 15 November 214. It re-entered the chart three times: at number 48 in January 2015, at number 42 in April and at number 34 in July. It peaked at number 13 in August. "My House" charted at number 17 on the UK Independent Singles Breakers Chart. "St. Patrick" peaked at number 7 on the UK Independent Singles Breakers Chart. "Fire" peaked at number 8 on the UK Independent Singles Breakers Chart, number 18 on the UK Rock & Metal Singles Chart and at number 41 on the UK Independent Singles Chart. On 29 April 2016, the album reached a new peak at number 55 on the UK Albums Chart. As of August 2017, the album has sold 60,000 copies in the UK and has been certified silver.

== Track listing ==
All songs written by Lyndsey Gunnulfsen and Blake Harnage, except for "Holy", "Fire" and "Eyelids" written by Gunnulfsen, Harnage and Sierra Kusterbeck.

White Noise track listing
No.	Title	Length
1.	"Smoke"	3:05
2.	"St. Patrick"	4:20
3.	"My House"	4:02
4.	"Holy"	4:55
5.	"White Noise"	4:22
6.	"Fire"	3:49
7.	"Eyelids"	5:07
8.	"Mirrors"	3:24
9.	"Ghosts"	3:40
10.	"Let Them In"	3:32
Total length:		40:19

Deluxe edition
No.	Title	Length
1.	"You and I"	4:30
2.	"Empty"	3:26
3.	"Smoke"	3:05
4.	"St. Patrick"	4:20
5.	"My House"	4:02
6.	"Holy"	4:55
7.	"White Noise"	4:22
8.	"Fire"	3:49
9.	"Eyelids"	5:07
10.	"Mirrors"	3:24
11.	"Ghosts"	3:40
12.	"Let Them In"	3:32
13.	"You & I" (stripped)	4:54
Total length:		53:11

Ten year anniversary edition
No.	Title	Length
14.	"My House" (featuring Courtney LaPlante)	4:03
15.	"Fire 2.0"	3:40
16.	"Mirrors" (Brian MacDonald Remix)	3:03
17.	"You & I" (live)	3:40
Total length:		67:37

== Personnel ==
Personnel per reissue sleeve.

Pvris

- Lyndsey Gunnulfsen – vocals, guitars, additional programming
- Alex Babinski – guitars
- Brian MacDonald – bass

Additional musicians

- Chris Kamrada – drums
- Sierra Kusterbeck – backing vocals ("You and I", "Smoke", "My House", "Fire", "Ghosts" and "Let Them In")
- Blake Harnage – backing vocals ("St. Patrick", "White Noise" and "Let Them In"); synths, programming, additional guitar
- Ellena Phillips – harp ("Empty")

Production

- Blake Harnage – producer, engineer
- Jeff Juliano – mixing
- Chris Athens – mastering
- David Cook – assistant engineer; mix assistant("You and I")
- Maika Maile – drum engineering
- Andrew Eliot – additional editing
- Chris Curran – additional editing
- Reuven Amiel – drums engineer ("You and I")
- Anthony Reeder – drums editing ("You and I")

== Charts ==
Chart performance for White Noise
Chart (2014–16)	Peak position
Scottish Albums (OCC)	53
UK Albums (OCC)	55
UK Independent Albums (OCC)	13
UK Independent Album Breakers (OCC)	12
UK Rock & Metal Albums (OCC)	20
US Billboard 200	88
US Independent Albums (Billboard)	6
US Top Rock Albums (Billboard)	11
US Top Alternative Albums (Billboard)	6

== Certifications ==
Certifications for White Noise
Region	Certification	Certified units/sales
United Kingdom (BPI)	Gold	100,000^{‡}
^{‡} Sales+streaming figures based on certification alone.
