= Evergreen (Pvris album) =

Studio album by Pvris
- Released: July 14, 2023
- Genre: Electropop
- Length: 32:00
- Label: Hopeless
- Producers: Daniel Armbruster; JT Daly; Lyndsey Gunnulfsen; Carrie Karpinen; Mike Shinoda; Y2K

Pvris chronology
Use Me (2020)	Evergreen (2023)	F.I.L.T.H. (2024)

Singles from Evergreen
- 1. "Animal" / "Anywhere but Here" Released: October 20, 2022; 2. "Goddess" Released: January 26, 2023; 3. "Good Enemy" Released: March 30, 2023; 4. "Love Is a..." Released: May 18, 2023; 5. "Evergreen" Released: June 22, 2023

Evergreen is the fourth studio album by American rock band Pvris, released on July 14, 2023, through Hopeless Records. It was preceded by the release of five singles, the first of which was a double A-side of "Animal" and "Anywhere but Here", followed by "Goddess", "Good Enemy", "Love Is a..." and "Evergreen".

== Background ==
Lynn Gunn described the album as "a reclamation of control in our post-pandemic culture, posing a complex discussion on fame, technology, spectacle, and female autonomy", also elaborating that it is "not [her] job to cater to certain trends or people's nostalgia" and she has to "always embrace the risks of change and trust that each stage of [her] music's life will resonate with whoever it's meant to".

== Critical reception ==
Professional ratings
Aggregate scores
Source	Rating
Metacritic	80/100
Review scores
Source	Rating
AllMusic	4.5/5 stars
DIY	3.5/5 stars
Kerrang!	4/5
The Line of Best Fit	9/10
Louder	3/5 stars
Sputnikmusic	2.3/5

Evergreen received a score of 80 out of 100 on review aggregator Metacritic based on six critics' reviews, indicating "generally favorable reviews". AllMusic's Neil Z. Yeung felt that Lyndsey Gunnulfsen's "evolution continues, building upon the promise of 2020's Use Me while laser-focusing her attack with equal parts melody and sheer force", as an "ineffably angst-packed energy surges through the front half of this set". Reviewing the album for Kerrang!, Aliya Chaudhry wrote that Gunnulfsen "pushes the idea of what Pvris can be even more, delving further into her hip-hop and R&B influences, culminating in an eclectic and electrifying collection of songs, and what is Pvris' most evolved offering to date".

DIY's Emma Wilkes noted that Evergreen "generally favours chunkier, harder sounds over intricacy, particularly where its maximalist-leaning production is concerned, to the extent that it feels like a thick, silvery fog hangs over most of its songs". Caitlin Chatterton of The Line of Best Fit opined that the album "settl[es] Gunnulfsen in the gap between her alt-rock influences and glitterball tendencies", describing it as "a testament to Gunnulfsen's growth" as well as "quietly confident".

Ghost Cult's Morgan Y. Evans called Evergreen,"...a very ambitious album and frankly by far the most thematically well-rounded and best effort from Pvris yet. Lyndsey Gerd Gunnulfsen has seamlessly planted a flag on the moon here, showing it was her that made this project special all along. Not only a queer champion, Gunnulfsen is a top-notch creator and performer who can back it up with grade-A material with startling philosophical depth amidst the beats and hooks."

Vicky Greer of Louder that "when Evergreen is at its best, it bursts with life, but after such a promising beginning, you can't help but feel short-changed" following "its disappointing second half". Jesper L. of Sputnikmusic stated that "the bulk of Evergreen does little more than yeeting a distorted riff at you, copy-pasting vocal melodies on top and subsequently repeating a few lines by way of a chorus" and concluded, "none of the songs here are particularly memorable or uh, good".

== Track listing ==
Evergreen track listing
No.	Title	Writer(s)	Producer(s)	Length
1.	"I Don't Wanna Do This Anymore"	Lyndsey Gunnulfsen; Y2K	Gunnulfsen; Y2K; Carrie Karpinen	3:31
2.	"Good Enemy"	Gunnulfsen; Matias Mora; Sean Van Vleet	Mora; Gunnulfsen^{[a]}; Cary Singer^{[a]}; Karpinen^{[a]}	2:10
3.	"Goddess"	Gunnulfsen; JT Daly; Van Vleet	Daly	2:32
4.	"Animal"	Gunnulfsen; Daly; Kristine Flaherty	Daly	2:51
5.	"Hype Zombies"	Gunnulfsen	Gunnulfsen; Karpinen	2:13
6.	"Take My Nirvana"	Gunnulfsen; Mike Shinoda	Shinoda	2:47
7.	"Senti-Mental"	Gunnulfsen; Daniel Armbruster	Armbruster; Gunnulfsen^{[a]}	2:51
8.	"Anywhere but Here"	Gunnulfsen; Daly	Daly	3:46
9.	"Headlights"	Gunnulfsen; Y2K	Gunnulfsen; Y2K; Karpinen^{[a]}	2:58
10.	"Love Is a..."	Gunnulfsen; Daly; Van Vleet	Daly	3:41
11.	"Evergreen"	Gunnulfsen	Gunnulfsen; Karpinen	3:13
Total length:				32:00

Note

- ^{^[a]} signifies an additional producer.

== Personnel ==
- Lyndsey Gunnulfsen – vocals (all tracks), recording (tracks 1, 5, 9, 11), additional programming (6), creative direction
- Joe LaPorta – mastering
- Alex Ghenea – mixing (1, 2, 5–7, 9, 10)
- JT Daly – mixing, recording (3, 4, 8, 10)
- Y2K – recording (1, 9)
- Carrie Karpinen – recording (1, 5, 11), additional tracking (9)
- Matias Mora – recording (2)
- Mike Shinoda – recording (6)
- Daniel Armbruster – recording (7)
- Vessed – creative direction, design
- Matty Vogel – photography

== Charts ==
Chart performance for Evergreen
Chart (2023)	Peak position
Scottish Albums (Official Charts)	4
UK Albums (Official Charts)	25
UK Independent Albums (Official Charts)	3
UK Rock & Metal Albums (Official Charts)	1
US Top Album Sales (Billboard)	29
US Top Current Album Sales (Billboard)	21
