= All We Know of Heaven, All We Need of Hell =

Studio album by Pvris
- Released: August 25, 2017
- Recorded: 2016–2017
- Studio: Big Blue North, Utica, New York; Songboi, Brooklyn, New York
- Genre: Electropop; synth-pop; dark pop; alternative rock; pop; electro-rock
- Length: 42:56
- Label: Rise; BMG
- Producer: Blake Harnage

Pvris chronology
White Noise (2014)	All We Know of Heaven, All We Need of Hell (2017)	Hallucinations (2019)

Singles from All We Know of Heaven, All We Need of Hell
- 1. "Heaven" Released: April 30, 2017; 2. "What's Wrong" Released: June 13, 2017; 3. "Anyone Else" Released: August 23, 2017; 4. "Same Soul" Released: December 15, 2017

All We Know of Heaven, All We Need of Hell is the second album by American rock band Pvris. It was released August 25, 2017. The first single "Heaven" was released on April 30, 2017.

== Background and recording ==
On July 27, 2016, Lynn Gunn posted a photo on her Twitter showing 45 songs that had been written for the band's second album. Pvris played their last show of 2016 at Summer Sonic Osaka on August 21. After this they went to the city of Utica in upstate New York to record their second album in a supposedly haunted church turned record studio.

Sessions were held at Big Blue North in Utica, New York and Songboi Studios in Brooklyn, New York, with producer Blake Harnage, who also acts as engineer, and additional production from Gunn. Anthony Reeder did engineering and editing, while Jef Moll engineered the drums Mark "Spike" Stent mixed "Heaven", "Half", "What's Wrong" and "Winter" with assistant Michael Freeman at The Mix Suite LA. Rich Costey mixed "Anyone Else", "Walk Alone", "No Mercy", "Separate" and "Nola 1", while Jeff Juliano mixed "Same Soul", before the album was mastered by Chris Athens. On February 13, 2017, Pvris confirmed on a post on their Facebook page that the album was done being recorded.

== Release ==
On February 17, 2017, Pvris updated all of their social media platforms with a new theme as well as a post with the roman numerals "II XX XVII" or 2 20 17. On February 20 they announced a small European tour. Lynn Gunn then proceeded to tweet out, "Oh my loves, can't you see? The new era has just begun." She also confirmed that fans would get to hear some new songs on the European tour. On May 4, and May 5, 2017, Pvris performed in London as a part of their European tour and previewed the song "Half" for the first time as a part of their new album. The song was later released as the first promotional single from the album on July 14, 2017. On May 1, All We Know of Heaven, All We Need of Hell was initially announced for release on August 4. However, on July 18, the release was pushed back to August 25 due to "last minute production tweaks". "Winter" was subsequently released on August 3, 2017, as the second promotional single. The title of the album was likely influenced or derived from the last lines of the Emily Dickinson poem, "My life closed twice before its close".

=== Singles ===
On April 30, 2017, Pvris premiered the single "Heaven" from the album on BBC's Radio 1 Rock Show.

On June 13, Pvris premiered "What's Wrong" on Annie Mac's BBC Radio 1 show as the second single from the album. The track topped the Kerrang! Rock Chart and spent several further weeks in the top 20.

On July 14, Pvris released a promotional single from the album, "Half", along with a visualette found on YouTube.

On August 3, Pvris released another promotional single, "Winter", with another visualette, promoted on social media.

On August 23, Pvris released the third single of their album “Anyone Else” by promoting it on their social media.

On December 15, Pvris released a radio edit of "Same Soul" as the fourth single from the album.

== Reception ==
Professional ratings
Aggregate scores
Source	Rating
Metacritic	86/100
Review scores
Source	Rating
Alternative Press	4.5/5 stars
London Evening Standard	3/5 stars
NME	4/5 stars
Q	4/5 stars
Rock Sound	8/10

All We Know of Heaven, All We Need of Hell received critical acclaim from music critics. At review aggregate site Metacritic, the album has an average score of 86 out of 100, based on 7 reviews, indicating "universal acclaim". Before release, Alternative Press included the album on their list of the most anticipated albums of the year. George Garner of Q said the album "marks an intensification of that latent darkness and musical expansiveness" as heard on White Noise.

== Track listing ==
Track listing per booklet.

No.	Title	Length
1.	"Heaven"	4:14
2.	"Half"	4:30
3.	"Anyone Else"	4:36
4.	"What's Wrong"	4:59
5.	"Walk Alone"	5:13
6.	"Same Soul"	3:47
7.	"Winter"	3:47
8.	"No Mercy"	3:59
9.	"Separate"	4:19
10.	"Nola 1"	3:39
Total length:		42:56

== Personnel ==
Personnel per booklet.

Pvris

- Lynn Gunn – vocals, guitar, drums, percussion, piano, organ, programming, additional production, creative direction, layout, design
- Brian MacDonald – bass
- Alex Babinski – guitar

Additional musicians

- Chris Kamrada – drums, percussion
- Mikaela Davis – harp
- Blake Harnage – synthesizers, programming

Design

- Taylor Bringuel – creative direction
- Randall Leddy – layout, design
- Andi Elloway – front cover photo, composite

Production and design

- Blake Harnage – production, engineering
- Mark "Spike" Stent – mixing (tracks 1, 2, 4 and 7)
- Michael Freeman – assistance
- Rich Costey – mixing (tracks 3, 5, 8, 9 and 10)
- Jeff Juliano – mixing (track 6)
- Chris Athens – mastering
- Anthony Reeder – engineering, editing
- Jef Moll – drum engineering
- Jarrod Fallon – drum technician
- John Colangelo – drum technician

== Charts ==
Chart (2017)	Peak position
Australian Albums (ARIA)	12
Austrian Albums (Ö3 Austria)	51
Belgian Albums (Ultratop Flanders)	80
Canadian Albums (Billboard)	45
Dutch Albums (Album Top 100)	81
German Albums (Offizielle Top 100)	97
Irish Albums (IRMA)	21
New Zealand Heatseekers Albums (RMNZ)	1
Scottish Albums (OCC)	5
Swiss Albums (Schweizer Hitparade)	71
UK Albums (OCC)	4
UK Album Downloads (OCC)	4
UK Independent Albums (OCC)	2
UK Rock & Metal Albums (OCC)	2
US Billboard 200	41
US Top Alternative Albums (Billboard)	4
US Top Rock Albums (Billboard)	4
