= Last Young Renegade =

Studio album by All Time Low
- Released: June 2, 2017
- Recorded: June 2016 – 2017
- Studios: EastWest Studios, Los Angeles
- Genres: Pop rock; synth-pop; new wave; power pop; alternative rock
- Length: 36:31
- Label: Fueled by Ramen
- Producers: Young Renegades; Colin Brittain; Blake Harnage; Nick Furlong; Andrew Goldstein; Dan Book; Mike Green; Nick Long

All Time Low chronology
Straight to DVD II: Past, Present and Future Hearts (2016)	Last Young Renegade (2017)	Wake Up, Sunshine (2020)

Singles from Last Young Renegade
- 1. "Dirty Laundry" Released: February 18, 2017; 2. "Last Young Renegade" Released: March 23, 2017; 3. "Life Of The Party" Released: April 28, 2017; 4. "Nice2KnoU" Released: May 19, 2017; 5. "Good Times" Released: June 26, 2017

Last Young Renegade is the seventh studio album by American rock band All Time Low. It was released on June 2, 2017, and is their first release with Fueled by Ramen. The lead single, "Dirty Laundry", premiered on BBC Radio 1 on February 17, 2017. The album debuted at number nine on the US Billboard 200, selling 33,000 units in its first week.

== Background and recording ==
Following the release of Future Hearts in April 2015, All Time Low began working on their next album shortly afterwards. The band spent several weeks staying at ranches in Big Bear and Palm Springs, California. Here, the band had a lot of time for "reflecting and soul-searching", according to vocalist/guitarist Alex Gaskarth.

In June 2016, Gaskarth emailed guitarist Jack Barakat a demo of "Dirty Laundry", which Barakat was immediately impressed by. Later that month, the band began recording Last Young Renegade at EastWest Studios in Los Angeles. With no deadline, the band worked at their own pace. The members would turn up at midday for the sessions, "playing around 'til something cool came out", according to Gaskarth. On occasion, Gaskarth would leave the studio enthusiastic with the progress being made on the album, other times he would feel burned out, incapable of listening to music for two days in a row.

== Composition ==
=== Music and lyrics ===
Gaskarth stated the band were concerned with "just pushing ourselves forward" with Last Young Renegade, wishing to "explore ... some darker tones". He said he was "reflecting more on my demons this time around". Gaskarth also said: "Our friends are getting married, ... having kids, ... passing away[, which added] another level of gravitas to things". Halfway through the writing process, while in the middle of working on four songs, the band came up with "Dirty Laundry" which helped "shaped the rest of the album."

Gaskarth mentioned the album had "a lot of indirect '80s influence on [it], and we had a lot of fun with analog keyboards." Gaskarth noted David Bowie and Prince as influences on the album. With "Last Young Renegade", Gaskarth said the group "needed to open [the album] with a banger, and open with one that had a lot of energy and movement." He was unsure if the song was going to feature on the album "until later [on] ... there was this story forming and that 'Last Young Renegade' could be such a cool piece of what the record was about". Gaskarth explained that while Future Hearts was composed from the viewpoint of the band "talking about our youth," "Dirty Laundry" was written "from the other perspective ... taking more of a nostalgic approach." He also said the track discusses "the guilty conscience and the mistakes that you've made and coming to terms with those and wearing them as badges."

== Release ==
On February 13, 2017, the band posted a teaser video. On February 17, the band announced they had signed to Fueled by Ramen since the start of 2016. Gaskarth explained that following their previous album Future Hearts, the band were unsigned and were looking for a new label. He said signing with Fueled by Ramen was the "perfect opportunity ... They really let us be who we want to be. There was no one there trying to shape us or guide us or direct us where to go from here." (Note: The band performed a showcase for Fueled by Ramen founder John Janick in winter 2006, however, they were not signed due to the label having recently signed Cute Is What We Aim For. As a result, the label was not in the position to sign on another band at the time. All Time Low eventually signing with Hopeless Records in early 2006. Gaskarth later collaborated with Fueled by Ramen, co-releasing the Friday Night Boys' Off the Deep End (2009) on his label The Party Scene.) On the same day, a music video was released for "Dirty Laundry", directed by Pat Tracy. Gaskarth said the video was influenced by "a dream about the ups and downs that make us who we are, sometimes worn and tired, but better for it... alive and inspired." A day later, the song was released as a single. On February 23, Last Young Renegade was announced for release, as well its artwork and track listing was revealed. In March, the band went on a tour of the UK with support from SWMRS and Waterparks.

On March 23, a music video was released for "Last Young Renegade", directed by Tracy. A day later, the song was released as a single. On April 28, a music video was released for "Life of the Party", directed by Tracy. The track was released as a single. In May, the band went on a tour of Australia with support from Neck Deep and The Maine. On May 19, a music video was released for "Nice2KnoU", directed by Tracy. It was also released as a single. "Good Times" was made available for streaming on May 31. Last Young Renegade was released on June 2. The band promoted its release with a number of in-store signings and acoustic performances. In addition, the group released limited edition jackets based on the jackets they wore in the music videos. From late June to early August, the band went on a US tour, dubbed The Young Renegades Tour, with support from SWMRS, Night Riots, Waterparks and the Wrecks. Following this, the group then performed in South Asia. European shows then occurred in October.

A music video was released for "Good Times" on November 1. The group embarked on an arena tour in the UK in March 2018. On April 25, 2018, a music video was released for the track "Afterglow".

== Reception ==
Professional ratings
Aggregate scores
Source	Rating
Metacritic	82/100
Review scores
Source	Rating
AllMusic	4/5 stars
Kerrang!	4/5 stars
Rock Sound	8/10 stars
Paste	7/10 stars

Last Young Renegade holds a score of 82 on review aggregator Metacritic, based on four reviews, indicating "universal acclaim", making it the band's highest scored album on the service. Interestingly, a vast portion of the album's critical support came from major mainstream music critics, unlike the band's usual tendency to receive moderate reviews from mainstream critics while receiving most of their overtly positive reception from critics heavily associated with the alternative music community. In contrast to this change, said alternative sources like Alternative Press gave positive but lukewarm reviews to the album, with their major criticism of the album being that it was "too clean" for the band. Regardless, many critics who had previously often viewed the band's music as generic cited the album's pop-influenced sound as a major turning point in the band's development and noted that it established them significantly from their contemporaries.

== Track listing ==
Standard Edition
No.	Title	Writer(s)	Producer(s)	Length
1.	"Last Young Renegade"	Alex Gaskarth; Busbee	Blake Harnage; Colin Brittain	3:34
2.	"Drugs & Candy"	Gaskarth; Andrew Goldstein; Dan Book	Brittain; Goldstein; Book	3:38
3.	"Dirty Laundry"	Gaskarth; Brittain; Nicholas Furlong; Nick Long	Brittain; Furlong; Long; Harnage	3:17
4.	"Good Times"	Gaskarth; Goldstein; Book	Goldstein; Book; Harnage; Brittain	3:44
5.	"Nice2KnoU"	Gaskarth; Brittain; Furlong	Brittain; Furlong; Harnage	3:16
6.	"Life of the Party"	Gaskarth; Svante Halldin; Jakob Hazell; Kevin Fisher	Harnage; Brittain; Jack & Coke	3:25
7.	"Nightmares"	Gaskarth; Furlong; Goldstein; Book	Brittain; Furlong; Goldstein; Book	4:08
8.	"Dark Side of Your Room"	Gaskarth; Halldin; Hazell	Brittain; Harnage; Jack & Coke	3:26
9.	"Ground Control" (featuring Tegan and Sara)	Gaskarth; Harnage; Mike Green; Phoebe Ryan	Harnage; Green; Brittain	3:56
10.	"Afterglow"	Gaskarth; Brittain; Furlong	Brittain; Furlong	4:04
Total length:				36:31

Japanese Bonus Tracks
No.	Title	Length
11.	"Chemistry"	2:51
12.	"Vampire Shift"	3:15
Total length:		42:38

== Personnel ==
All Time Low

- Alex Gaskarth – lead vocals, rhythm guitar
- Jack Barakat – lead guitar, backing vocals
- Zack Merrick – bass, backing vocals
- Rian Dawson – drums, percussion

Additional musicians

- Nick Long – additional guitars on track 4
- Jonny Litten – programming on track 3
- Blake Harnage – vocal and additional production on tracks 3 and 5
- Ben Sabin – Steinway piano on track 3, synths on tracks 2 and 7
- Austin Love – programming on tracks 2 and 7
- Cooper Fuqua – trombone on tracks 2 and 7
- Tegan and Sara – vocals on track 9, backing vocals on track 1
- Rex Coggins – piano on track 10

Production

- Patrick Tracy – creative direction
- Sam Spratt – cover artwork, art direction
- Andrew Cook – design and layout
- Pamela Littky – photography
- Carolyn Tracey – packaging production
- Anthony Reeder – engineering
- Alex Prieto – engineering
- Ben Sabin – engineering
- Nick Furlong – producer, additional vocals (tracks 3, 5, 7, 10)
- Colin Brittain – producer, additional production (tracks 1, 4), mixing (tracks 1, 2, 7–10)
- Manny Marroquin – mixing (track 4)
- Serban Ghenea – mixing (track 3)
- Chris Lord-Alge – mixing (track 5)
- Mark "Spike" Stent – mixing (track 6)
- Ted Jensen – mastering
- Joe LaPorta – mastering (track 6)

Source: Last Young Renegade booklet.

== Charts ==
Chart (2017)	Peak position
Australian Albums (ARIA)	5
Austrian Albums (Ö3 Austria)	47
Belgian Albums (Ultratop Flanders)	28
Belgian Albums (Ultratop Wallonia)	45
Canadian Albums (Billboard)	38
Dutch Albums (Album Top 100)	45
German Albums (Offizielle Top 100)	47
Irish Albums (IRMA)	18
Italian Albums (FIMI)	62
Japanese Albums (Oricon)	81
New Zealand Albums (RMNZ)	7
Scottish Albums (Official Charts)	4
Spanish Albums (Promusicae)	77
Swiss Albums (Schweizer Hitparade)	62
UK Albums (Official Charts)	7
US Billboard 200	9
US Top Alternative Albums (Billboard)	1
US Top Rock Albums (Billboard)	2

== Awards ==
Rock Sound Awards

Year	Recipient/work	Award	Result	Ref.
2017	Last Young Renegade	Album Of The Year Award	Won	
