= Neon (Versa EP) =

EP by Versa
- Released: January 21, 2014
- Recorded: 2012–2013
- Genre: Synthpop
- Label: Self-released
- Producers: Blake Harnage, Shaun Lopez, Andrew Dawson

Versa chronology
Another Atmosphere Preview (2013)	Neon (2014)

Singles from Neon
- 1. "Neon" Released: November 22, 2013

Neon is an EP by American electronic duo Versa self-released on January 21, 2014, as a "pay what you want" download via Bandcamp, and regular download on iTunes and Spotify. The EP is their first release as Versa, previously known as VersaEmerge.

== Track listing ==
No.	Title	Length
1.	"Neon"	4:29
2.	"Illusion"	3:48
3.	"Wanderlust"	5:55

== Personnel ==
Versa

- Sierra Kay – lead vocals
- Blake Harnage – lead guitar, vocals, producer on "Neon" and "Wanderlust"

Production

- Shaun Lopez – Producer on "Illusion"
- Andrew Dawson – Producer on "Illusion"
- Jeff Juliano – Mixing on "Neon" and "Wanderlust"
- Jim Monti – Mixing on "Illusion"
- Chris Athens – Mastering
