= Hallucinations (EP) =

EP by Pvris
- Released: October 25, 2019
- Recorded: 2017–2019
- Genres: Electropop; synth-pop; electro-rock
- Length: 19:14
- Labels: Reprise; Warner
- Producers: Daniel Armbruster; JT Daly; Lyndsey Gunnulfsen

Pvris chronology
All We Know of Heaven, All We Need of Hell (2017)	Hallucinations (2019)	Use Me (2020)

Singles from Hallucinations
- 1. "Death of Me" Released: July 12, 2019; 2. "Hallucinations" Released: August 16, 2019; 3. "Old Wounds" Released: December 10, 2019

Hallucinations is the third extended play by American rock band Pvris. It was released October 25, 2019. The first single "Death of Me" was released July 12, 2019.

== Background and writing ==
On April 9, 2019, Pvris frontwoman Lynn Gunn posted a video on her Instagram featuring a few seconds of some previously unheard music, captioning the photo "She's been quiet but she's been WORKIN' (and practicing her winking)". After the band had moved to Warner, Gunn stated that "everything is moving in a new direction." She continued "the energy of their label and everybody who's started to work with us is so great. It genuinely feels like a family. Very tight-knit. It's a very different experience than what we've had in the past. Very pleasant from the get-go."

While Pvris' previous albums had been produced with Blake Harnage, Hallucinations was produced in collaboration with a variety of other artists, most notably JT Daly, who assisted in rewriting several songs for the EP with Gunn. Marshmello and Amy Allen cowrote the second, eponymous single from Hallucinations with Gunn.

Gunn stated in an interview with Rock Sound that writing begun for the EP at some point during 2016. When discussing the tracks on the EP, she stated,

Nightmare came together probably 3 years ago. I was in a hotel room and made the demo at my hotel and it's kinda been an ongoing work in progress for the last 3 years and then finally once we started working with JT Daly, who did "Death of Me" and "Hallucinations," we started going through a lot of old demos and reworking them and that was one we picked out and it came out really cool. I've just always loved it, there's a lot of hooks in it, it's fun. I'd say it's a much cheekier side of us but it's still a little bit dark, like the lyrics are not necessarily creepy but still leaning dark. But the production is bright and fun. The visuals will have to be a nice balance of the two. It'll be for the EP, but it might over to the [full length] record too. Old Wounds" was actually [written] around the same time I wrote "Nightmare," same location as well. It was right before I moved to Brooklyn. Both of [the songs are] about the same situation with the same person and that one from the get go felt very special and I was waiting to find the right person to fully produce it and JT [Daly] smashed it. "Old Wounds" is a lot more classic, dark, brooding PVRIS. Both songs are very contrasting to each other, but we're always doing things that are all over the place.

== Composition ==
The EP was noted as a departure from their previous albums in terms of sound. "Hallucinations" and "Death of Me" both had a more pop-driven direction than their previous work. Gunn stated that "We've always had little Easter eggs that have bridged things from record to record, bridged our progress together. A lot of those 'lighter' songs - 'What's Wrong', 'Winter', 'Nola 1' - [they were] a bridge to where we wanted to go in the future. It's been really natural. We've always wanted to go in this direction, and we're finally being supported to do that. I think the stars have aligned."

== Release ==
On August 16, 2019, Pvris announced that their upcoming EP would be released October 25, 2019. This was later confirmed October 19, 2019 on the band's Instagram when they posted the album's title and cover art.

=== Singles ===
On July 12, 2019, they released a new single "Death of Me", and an accompanying music video, as their lead single from Hallucinations. The track debuted at number 1 on the Kerrang Rock Chart.

On August 16, 2019, the band released a new song/video called "Hallucinations" as their second single, which saw the band continue their progression towards a more dance/EDM influenced sound. In the week leading up to the release of the single, Pvris sent exclusive vinyl copies of the single to their fans. Frontwoman Lynn Gunn later stated on Twitter that those vinyl were a limited edition of only 500 copies.

"Hallucinations", "Death of Me" and "Old Wounds” are on the band's third album Use Me, released on August 28, 2020. A new version of "Things Are Better" was released on the deluxe edition of the album.

== Track listing ==
No.	Title	Writer(s)	Length
1.	"Hallucinations"	Lyndsey Gunnulfsen; Amy Allen; JT Daly; Marshmello	3:43
2.	"Nightmare"	Gunnulfsen; Daly	3:08
3.	"Death of Me"	Gunnulfsen; Daniel Armbruster; Daly	3:31
4.	"Things Are Better"	Gunnulfsen; Busbee; Daly	3:57
5.	"Old Wounds"	Gunnulfsen	4:55
Total length:			19:15

== Personnel ==
- Lyndsey Gunnulfsen – lead vocals, background vocals (all tracks); instrumentation (tracks 1, 2, 4), programming (2), production (3–5); bass, drums, guitar (3); engineering (2, 5)
- JT Daly – production, engineering (all tracks); programming (tracks 1–4), instrumentation (1, 2, 4), keyboards (3)
- Daniel Armbruster – production (track 3)
- Joe LaPorta – mastering
- Mark "Spike" Stent – mixing (tracks 1, 5)
- Michael Freeman – mixing (track 1), mixing assistance (5)
- Lars Stalfors – mixing (tracks 2–4)
- Josh Lovell – engineering (tracks 2, 4, 5), engineering assistance (1)
