= Live Acoustic (VersaEmerge EP) =

Live Acoustic EP

EP / Live album by VersaEmerge
- Released: August 23, 2011
- Recorded: 2011
- Genres: Alternative rock, experimental rock
- Length: 16:37
- Label: Fueled by Ramen

VersaEmerge chronology
Fixed at Zero (2010)	Live Acoustic EP (2011)	Another Atmosphere Preview (2013)

Live Acoustic EP is the fourth EP by American experimental rock band VersaEmerge. It was released in August 2011 to tide over fans until the release of their second album, Another Atmosphere.

== Track list ==
No.	Title	Length
1.	"Toxic (Live Acoustic)"	3:11
2.	"Father Sky (Live Acoustic)"	3:50
3.	"E.T. (Live Acoustic)"	2:53
4.	"Mythology (Live Acoustic)"	3:45
5.	"American Boy (Live Acoustic)"	2:43

== Personnel ==
VersaEmerge

- Sierra Kusterbeck - vocals
- Blake Harnage - guitar
