= Fixed at Zero =

Studio album by VersaEmerge
- Released: June 22, 2010
- Recorded: 2009–2010, at Cheateau Relxaeau, Malibu, California
- Genre: Alternative rock, experimental rock
- Length: 44:09; 59:04 (w/ bonus tracks)
- Label: Fueled by Ramen
- Producer: Dave Bassett

VersaEmerge chronology
VersaEmerge (2009)	Fixed at Zero (2010)	Live Acoustic (2011)

Singles from Fixed at Zero
- 1. "Fixed at Zero" Released: July 13, 2010; 2. "Your Own LoV.E." Released: January 12, 2011; 3. "Figure It Out" Released: April 6, 2011

Fixed at Zero is the only studio album by American experimental rock band VersaEmerge, released through Fueled by Ramen on June 22, 2010.

The album was made available for pre-order on iTunes and the Fueled by Ramen store on May 11, 2010.

The first single off the album, "Fixed at Zero", was released on July 13, 2010. The second single, "Your Own LoV.E.", was released on January 12, 2011. The third single, "Figure It Out", was released on April 6, 2011.

== Reception ==
Professional ratings
Review scores
Source	Rating
Allmusic	(Mixed)
Alternative Press	4/5 stars

Fixed at Zero received positive reviews. Alternative Press gave the album 4 out of 5 stars, applauding the album on its broad dynamic range. AbsolutePunk praised the band's work on the album, stating "In a time where a lot of similar acts care more about style rather than substance, VersaEmerge is a breath of fresh air." Sputnik Music gave the album 3.5 out of 5 stars, stating "If you haven’t given Versa a shot, either because pop-rock’s not your thing, or you feel obligated to hate everything Fueled by Ramen touches, consider this a dare. The band is a breath of ingenuity in a pretty stale parade of warped tour schlock." The Sound Alarm gave the album a score of 8 out of 10, stating "These guys have a very bright future in the music industry, and it couldn’t be more relevant in this release, Fixed at Zero."

== Track listing ==
No.	Title	Writer(s)	Length
1.	"Figure It Out"	Blake Harnage; Sierra Kusterbeck; Dave Bassett	3:30
2.	"Mind Reader"	Harnage; Kusterbeck; Bassett	3:49
3.	"Fixed at Zero"	Harnage; Kusterbeck; Bassett	3:42
4.	"You'll Never Know"	Harnage; Kusterbeck; Bassett	4:09
5.	"Stranger"	Harnage; Kusterbeck; Bassett	3:55
6.	"Redesign Me"	Harnage; Kusterbeck; Bassett	3:56
7.	"Fire (Aim Your Arrows High)"	Harnage; Kusterbeck; Bassett	4:43
8.	"Up There"	Harnage; Kusterbeck; Guy Sigsworth	4:26
9.	"Your Own LoV.E."	Harnage; Kusterbeck	2:57
10.	"Mythology"	Harnage; Kusterbeck	4:35
11.	"Lost Tree"	Harnage; Kusterbeck; Bassett	7:07
Total length:			44:09

Deluxe Edition Bonus Tracks
No.	Title	Writer(s)	Length
12.	"Father Sky"	Harnage; Kusterbeck; Bassett	3:57
13.	"Let Down"	Harnage; Kusterbeck; Kara DioGuardi	3:14
14.	"Fixed at Zero" (Acoustic)	Harnage; Kusterbeck; Bassett	4:04
15.	"You'll Never Know" (Acoustic)	Harnage; Kusterbeck; Bassett	4:20
Total length:			59:04

== Personnel ==
Fixed at Zero album personnel as listed on Allmusic.

VersaEmerge

- Sierra Kusterbeck – lead vocals
- Blake Harnage – lead guitar, backing vocals, programming
- Devin Ingelido – bass, backing vocals

Additional musicians

- Dorian Crozier - drums, percussion

Artwork and design

- Eika Dopludo - Illustrations
- Rachelle Dupéré - Art direction

Production

- Dave Bassett - Producer, engineer
- Bret Disend - Executive producer
- Erik Ron - Engineer
- J.R. McNeely - Mixing
- Stephen Marcussen - Mastering
- Michelle Piza - Package manager
- Guy Sigsworth - Programming
- Matt Feldman - Management
- Mark Weiss - Management
