= Another Atmosphere Preview =

EP by VersaEmerge
- Released: July 31, 2012
- Recorded: 2012
- Genre: Electronic rock
- Length: 13:29
- Label: Fueled by Ramen
- Producer: Shaun Lopez

VersaEmerge chronology
Live Acoustic (2011)	Another Atmosphere Preview (2012)	Neon (2014)

Another Atmosphere Preview is the fifth EP by American electronic duo VersaEmerge released on July 31, 2012, as a digital download. The song "Burn" was added on March 26, 2013. The EP is their last piece of content released as VersaEmerge before changing their name to Versa.

== Track list ==
No.	Title	Writer(s)	Length
1.	"No Consequences"	Blake Harnage, Sierra Kusterbeck, Matthew Lang, William Lefler, Simon Wilcox	3:10
2.	"Bones"		3:39
3.	"Domesticated"		3:30
4.	"Burn"		3:10
