= Use Me (Pvris album) =

Studio album by Pvris
- Released: August 28, 2020
- Recorded: 2017–2020
- Genre: Electropop
- Length: 40:41
- Label: Warner
- Producer: JT Daly; Lyndsey Gunnulfsen

Pvris chronology
Hallucinations (2019)	Use Me (2020)	Evergreen (2023)

Singles from Use Me
- 1. "Death of Me" Released: July 12, 2019; 2. "Hallucinations" Released: August 16, 2019; 3. "Old Wounds" Released: December 10, 2019; 4. "Dead Weight" Released: March 4, 2020; 5. "Gimme a Minute" Released: April 24, 2020; 6. "Use Me" Released: September 29, 2020; 7. "Thank You" Released: October 23, 2020

Use Me is the third studio album by American rock band Pvris. It was released August 28, 2020, by Warner Records. The album features 11 songs, three of which are featured on the band's 2019 EP, Hallucinations. Use Me is the band's final album to feature lead guitarist Alex Babinski, who was fired from the band following allegations of sexual misconduct two days before the album's release. It is also their only album to be released on Warner before the band signed to Hopeless Records in 2023. A deluxe edition of the album was released on October 23, 2020.

== Background ==
On March 4, Pvris announced the album's title and initial May 1 release date. However, due to the ongoing COVID-19 pandemic, the album was postponed to July 10, and once more to August 28.

== Singles ==
The singles "Death of Me" and "Hallucinations" were originally released in 2019 for the band's first EP Hallucinations (2019).

On March 4, 2020, the single, "Dead Weight" was released. It is the first single from Use Me released apart from Hallucinations. On April 24, they released the fourth single "Gimme a Minute" along with a sci-fi themed music video. "Thank You"

== Critical reception ==
Professional ratings
Aggregate scores
Source	Rating
Metacritic	87/100
Review scores
Source	Rating
AllMusic	4/5 stars
DIY	4/5 stars
Kerrang!	4/5 stars
NME	4/5 stars
The Line of Best Fit	9/10
Q	4/5 stars

Use Me received critical acclaim. On review aggregator website Metacritic, it has a rating of 87 out of 100 based on 8 reviews.

== Track listing ==
Use Me track listing
No.	Title	Writer(s)	Length
1.	"Gimme a Minute"	Lyndsey Gunnulfsen; JT Daly; Tommy English; Nate Campany	3:28
2.	"Dead Weight"	Gunnulfsen; Daly; English; Sean Van Vleet; Nate Cyphert	3:27
3.	"Stay Gold"	Gunnulfsen; Daly	4:00
4.	"Good to Be Alive"	Gunnulfsen; Daly; Van Vleet	3:17
5.	"Death of Me"	Gunnulfsen; Daly; Daniel Armbruster	3:31
6.	"Hallucinations"	Gunnulfsen; Daly; Amy Allen; Marshmello	3:43
7.	"Old Wounds"	Gunnulfsen	4:55
8.	"Loveless"	Gunnulfsen; Daly; Campany; Van Vleet	3:49
9.	"January Rain"	Gunnulfsen; Daly; Van Vleet	3:31
10.	"Use Me" (featuring 070 Shake)	Gunnulfsen; Daly	3:23
11.	"Wish You Well"	Gunnulfsen; Daly; Justin Tranter; Zach Skelton	3:37
Total length:			40:41

Use Me – Deluxe edition
No.	Title	Writer(s)	Length
12.	"Thank You" (featuring Raye)	Gunnulfsen; Rachel Keen; Marco Borrero; Mitch Allan; Livvi Franc	3:32
13.	"Things Are Better" (Alt Version)	Gunnulfsen; Daly; Busbee	2:59
14.	"Use Me (Mija Remix)" (featuring 070 Shake)	Gunnulfsen; Daly	3:42
15.	"Dead Weight (Nicole Moudaber Remix)"	Gunnulfsen; Daly; English; Van Vleet; Cyphert	3:45
16.	"Loveless (Lynn Mix)"	Gunnulfsen; Daly; Campany; Van Vleet	3:25
Total length:			17:23

=== Notes ===
- Physical versions of the album contain the original version of "Use Me", which did not contain a verse from 070 Shake and instead contained a second verse from Lynn Gunn.

== Personnel ==
- Lyndsey Gunnulfsen – vocals (all tracks), background vocals (tracks 1–9, 15, 16), bass (1–5, 9, 12, 15), drums (1, 2, 4, 5, 9, 11, 15), electric guitar (1–5, 9, 11, 12, 15), percussion (1–5, 9, 11, 15), acoustic guitar (4, 8, 9, 16), programming (9), remixing (16)
- JT Daly – keyboards (1–5, 8–11, 14–16), programming (1–6, 8–11, 14–16), strings (8, 10, 14, 16)
- Tommy English – additional guitar (2, 15)
- Jeremy Larson – strings (10, 14)
- 070 Shake – vocals (10, 14)
- Mitch Allan – electric guitar, keyboards, programming, synthesizer (12)
- Mag – keyboards, programming, synthesizer (12)
- Raye – vocals (12)
- Mija – remixing (14)
- Nicole Moudaber – remixing (15)

Technical

- JT Daly – production (all tracks), mixing (1, 10, 13, 14, 16), engineering (1–11, 14–16)
- Lyndsey Gunnulfsen – production (7, 9), additional production (10)
- Mag – production (12)
- Mitch Allan – production (12)
- Joe LaPorta – mastering (1–11, 13–16)
- Chris Gehringer – mastering (12)
- Mark "Spike" Stent – mixing (2, 6, 7, 15)
- Lars Stolfers – mixing (3–5, 8, 9)
- Michael Freeman – mixing (6), mixing assistance (7)
- Josh Lovell – mixing (11), engineering (1, 4, 7, 8, 11, 15, 16), engineering assistance (2, 3, 5, 6, 9, 10, 13, 14)
- Mag – mixing (12)
- Lyndsey Gunnulfsen – engineering (7)
- Caleb Hulin – engineering (12)
- Bailey McDougal – vocal recording (14)
- Jeremy Larson – engineering assistance (10, 13, 14)
- Drew Gold – additional editing (15)

== Charts ==
Chart performance for Use Me
Chart (2020)	Peak position
Australian Albums (ARIA)	36
Hungarian Albums (MAHASZ)	22
Scottish Albums (OCC)	7
UK Albums (OCC)	14
US Billboard 200	155
