= Cities Built on Sand =

EP by VersaEmerge
- Released: November 11, 2007
- Recorded: 2005–2007
- Genre: Post-hardcore, experimental rock
- Label: Self-released
- Producer: Andrew Wade

VersaEmerge chronology
Cities Built on Sand (2007)	Perceptions (2008)

Cities Built on Sand is the first released EP by American post-hardcore group VersaEmerge. It was independently released in 2007. This EP featured their previous vocalist Spencer Pearson.

== Track list ==
No.	Title	Length
1.	"Prelude"	0:14
2.	"Forced Doors on the 14th Floor"	4:22
3.	"The Blank Static Screen"	5:37
4.	"Cities Built on Sand"	4:29
5.	"Ennui"	4:18
