= Good Times (All Time Low song) =

- Single cover for orchestral arrangement

Single by All Time Low

from the album Last Young Renegade
- Released: June 26, 2017
- Genre: Pop rock
- Length: 3:45
- Label: Fueled by Ramen
- Songwriters: Alex Gaskarth; Andrew Goldstein; Dan Book
- Producers: Andrew Goldstein; Dan Book

All Time Low singles chronology
"Nice2KnoU" (2017)	"Good Times" (2017)	"Everything Is Fine" (2018)

Music video
- "Good Times" on YouTube

"Good Times" is a song recorded by American rock band All Time Low for their seventh studio album, Last Young Renegade (2017). Lead singer Alex Gaskarth co-wrote the song with its producers, Andrew Goldstein and Dan Book. The song was first released to digital retailers on May 31, 2017 as the fourth and final promotional track before the album's release. "Good Times" was serviced to American adult radio on June 26, 2017 through Fueled by Ramen as the second and final official single from Last Young Renegade.

== Background ==
"Good Times" was the first song written for the album, being composed shortly after the April 2015 release of their previous record, Future Hearts. Its nostalgic theme "set the tone for the entire [Last Young Renegade] album," according to a post on the group's official Twitter account. The band told iHeartRadio that the song is "about looking back on all the things that made you who you are." Guitarist Jack Barakat called "Good Times" the "best song" Gaskarth has "ever written," while drummer Rian Dawson remembers "being so excited about the new album because we were off to a great start," with the track.

== Commercial performance ==
"Good Times" debuted at number 37 on the Billboard Adult Pop Songs chart dated July 29, 2017. This earned the group their first entry on the chart, and highest ranking on any American pop-based airplay chart after "I Feel Like Dancin'" reached number 39 on the Pop Songs chart in 2011. The song has since peaked at number 13.

== Critical reception ==
Neil Z. Yeung of AllMusic called the song "peppy" and compared it favorably to the work of contemporaries The All-American Rejects and Plain White T's. Scott Heisel of Paste was more critical, writing that "Good Times" is "a bit of a slog, trying too hard to be anthemic." In a similar vein, Sophie Trenear of The Edge wrote that "Good Times" and album track "Ground Control" both "offer something of a wave of crassly-forged nostalgia set to the beat of something resembling accessible."

== Charts ==
Chart (2017)	Peak position
US Adult Pop Airplay (Billboard)	13
US Hot Rock & Alternative Songs (Billboard)	23

== Release history ==
Country	Date	Format	Version	Label	Ref.
Worldwide	May 31, 2017	Digital download	Original	Fueled by Ramen	
United States	June 26, 2017	Hot adult contemporary	Original	Fueled by Ramen; RRP	
United States	June 27, 2017	Contemporary hit radio	Original	Fueled by Ramen; RRP	
Worldwide	September 15, 2017	Digital download	Orchestral arrangement	Atlantic; Fueled by Ramen	
