= VersaEmerge (EP) =

EP by VersaEmerge
- Released: February 3, 2009
- Recorded: 2008–2009
- Genres: Experimental rock, symphonic rock, alternative rock
- Length: 17:07
- Label: Fueled by Ramen
- Producer: James Paul Wisner

VersaEmerge chronology
Perceptions (2008)	VersaEmerge (2009)	Fixed at Zero (2010)

Professional ratings
Review scores
Source	Rating
Sputnikmusic	4/5 stars

VersaEmerge is the self-titled EP of the American experimental rock band of the same name. It is the first of their efforts not to be self-released. After signing to Fueled By Ramen, the band began writing the EP, recording it with producer James Paul Wisner (Underoath, Dashboard Confessional, The Academy Is..., My American Heart). This EP was available from their then-upcoming tours "The Secret Valentine Tour" and the "Craig Owens Tour", and is still available from the Fueled By Ramen webstore, and iTunes Store. The record reached #44 on the Billboard Heatseekers chart. 'Past Praying For' is the first single from the EP and a music video was made. In December 2009, they released 'Whisperer' as their second and last single with a tour video as the promotional clip.

== Track listing ==
No.	Title	Length
1.	"Theatrics"	0:39
2.	"The Hider"	2:43
3.	"Past Praying For"	2:55
4.	"Moments Between Sleep"	3:27
5.	"Whisperer"	3:14
6.	"Clocks (Acoustic)"	4:09
Total length:		17:07
