= Lynn Gunn =

American musician

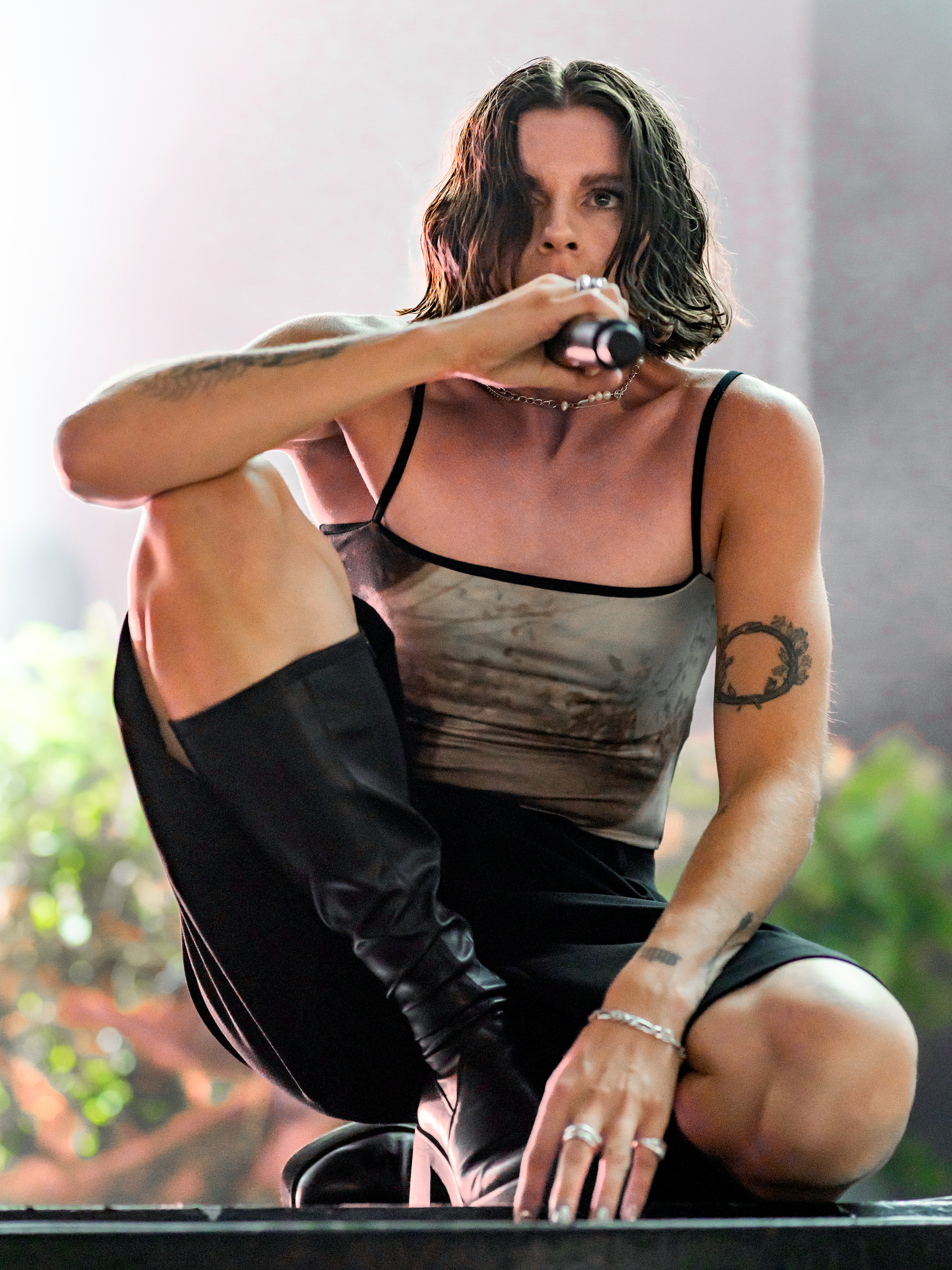
- Lynn Gunn in 2023

Background information
- Born: Lyndsey Gerd Gunnulfsen; March 15, 1994 (age 32); Boston, Massachusetts, U.S.
- Origin: Lowell, Massachusetts, U.S.
- Genres: Electropop; post-hardcore; alternative rock; pop rock; synth-pop
- Occupations: Singer; musician; songwriter
- Instruments: Vocals; keyboards; guitar; drums; bass guitar
- Years active: 2009–present
- Member of: PVRIS

Lynn Gunn (born March 15, 1994), born Lyndsey Gerd Gunnulfsen, is an American singer and multi-instrumentalist, best known for fronting the rock band PVRIS. She has also collaborated with artists such as Tonight Alive and A Loss for Words.

== Early life and education ==
Lyndsey Gunnulfsen grew up in Lowell, Massachusetts. She attended Lowell High School, where she participated in Battle of The Bands with her classmates before graduating in 2012. She was originally going to attend Massachusetts College of Art and Design but ultimately backed out to pursue PVRIS as a full-time project.

== Career ==
=== PVRIS ===
Gunn is one of the founders of the electronic alternative rock band PVRIS (pronounced "Paris") in 2012, which was then named Operation Guillotine, started in 2009. By 2013, Gunn had replaced Kyle Anthony as lead vocalist and guitarist. For legal reasons, the name of the band was officially changed to Pvris on July 26, 2013.

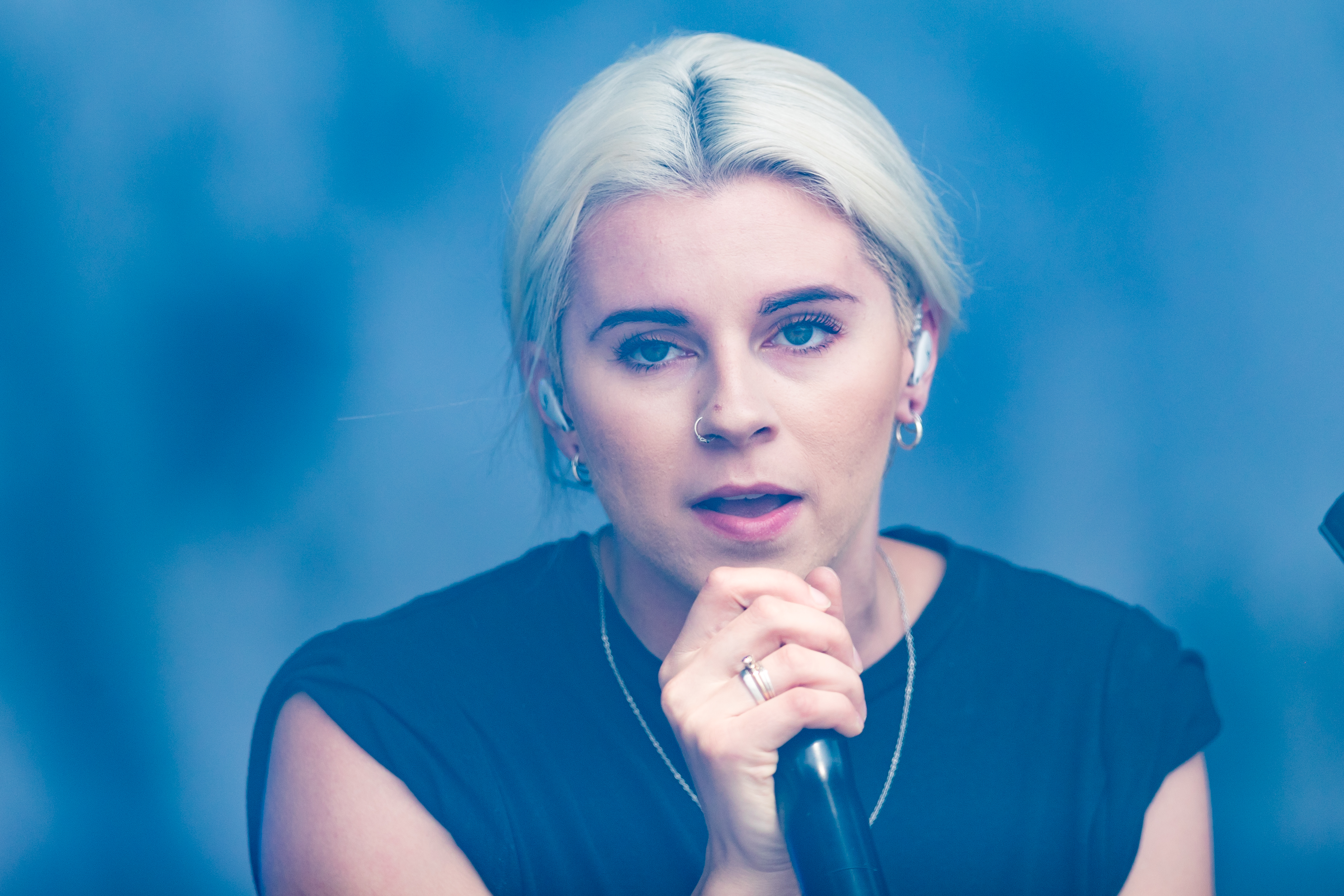
Gunn performing as part of PVRIS in 2018

In 2018, Gunn opened up about vocal issues which she had been struggling with during her recent tours, and stated that she was undergoing vocal coaching to relearn how to sing. Gunn had previously acknowledged difficulties with "vocal kinks" and apologized if she had not "seemed herself" during live shows. In a 2019 interview with Kerrang!, Gunn stated that she had visited several ENT doctors who found that there was nothing physically wrong with her, and she felt that she was dealing with psychological blocks which prevented her from singing.

=== Other work and collaborations ===
She has collaborated with other bands and musicians as a singer and songwriter. In 2013, Gunn collaborated with American pop-punk band A Loss for Words on the single "Distance". She co-wrote two tracks for Dissonants, the 2016 album from Australian rock band Hands Like Houses. In 2017, she was featured on the track "Lose Myself" on The Throes of Winter by Seven Lions, and on Circa Waves' album Different Creatures.

In 2016, it was rumoured that Gunn was going to collaborate on new music with her friend Jenna McDougall, frontwoman of the Australian rock band Tonight Alive. Gunn was featured on the single "Disappear" which appeared on Tonight Alive's 2018 album Underworld.

She briefly filled in for Katie Henderson of The Aces as a guitarist when the band was supporting 5 Seconds of Summer on their Meet You There Tour. In 2019, she collaborated with From Indian Lakes on the single "Did We Change".

== Personal life ==
Gunn has spoken about her lifelong fascination with graveyards, death, and the occult, stating that this was the inspiration behind many of the paranormal and macabre themes in her song-writing. Spiritually, she has said she is "into astrology and life paths and weird energetics stuff". Gunn has stated that she has struggled with depression, and that this was a major inspiration for much of her song-writing. Gunn has also cited bands such as Paramore, Radiohead, Florence and the Machine, and The Weeknd as musical influences.

In 2020, Gunn revealed that she has an autoimmune disease called Ankylosing spondylitis, which she was diagnosed with in 2018. She was also diagnosed with Crohn’s disease in October 2019.

=== Public image and LGBT activism ===
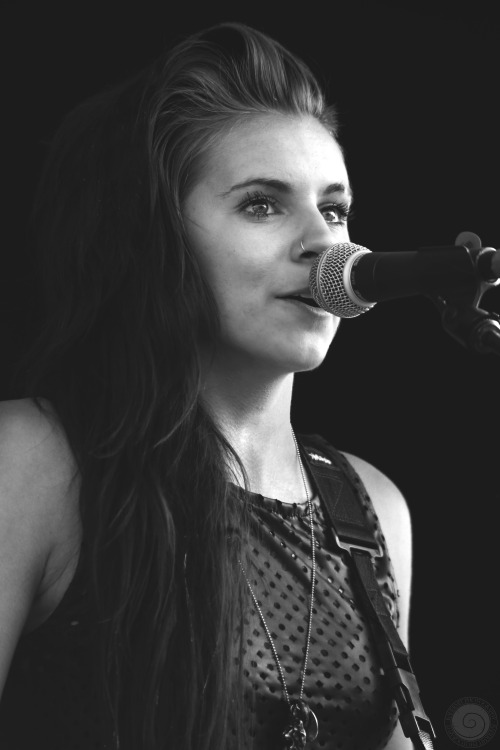
Lynn Gunn in 2015

Gunn is a prominent LGBT voice in the alternative music scene. She stated in an interview for Rolling Stone that she first came out as gay to her parents when she was 18, by leaving a letter under her mother's pillow before she went on tour. "First and foremost I want to be known as is an artist and creative before anything else," she explained in an interview with Playboy. "I think my sexuality is the last thing to check off on that list." Gunn explained her decision to be vocal about her sexuality in an interview with Newsbeat in 2015: "I never had someone to look up to and be like 'oh that person is OK and they're gay.' If I can be that for someone then it's why I'm open about it."

Gunn was one of several artists invited by GLAAD and Billboard to talk about her coming-out story for National Coming Out Day in 2017. Gunn cited her family's supportiveness while she was coming out and encouraged others to reach out for the support around them.

Gunn presented the Icon Award to Laura Jane Grace of the American punk rock band Against Me! at the 2017 APMA Awards.

== Discography ==
Studio albums with Pvris

- White Noise (2014)
- All We Know of Heaven, All We Need of Hell (2017)
- Use Me (2020)
- Evergreen (2023)

=== Extended plays with Pvris ===
List of extended plays
Title	Extended play details
Paris	Released: March 26, 2013; Label: Self-released; Format: CD, DL
Acoustic	Released: April 1, 2014; Label: Self-released; Format: CS, DL, 10" vinyl
Hallucinations	Released: October 25, 2019; Label: Reprise/Warner Records; Format: CD, CS, DL, LP

=== Other songs with Pvris ===
Year	Title	Album
2010	"It's Not That I Don't Trust You" (as Operation Guillotine)	Non-album song
2012	"Gemini" (featuring Kyle Anthony)	Non-album song
2012	"Mind Over Matter"	Non-album song
2013	"Rain" (Love, Robot featuring Pvris)	Non-album song
2013	"Follow"	Non-album song
2014	"Chandelier"	Punk Goes Pop Vol. 6
2017	"Are You Ten Years Ago"	The Con X: Covers
2017	"Fire That Burns" (Circa Waves featuring Pvris)	Different Creatures

=== Featured tracks ===
List of tracks featuring Lynn Gunn
Year	Title	Vocals	Writer	Single	Album
2013	"Distance" (A Loss For Words featuring Lynn Gunn)	Yes	No	Yes	Before It Caves
2014	"Obsessed" (TBMA featuring Lynn Gunn)	Yes	No	Yes	Obsessed
2015	"Lose Myself" (Seven Lions featuring Lynn Gunn)	Yes	No	Yes	The Throes of Winter
2016	"Degrees of Separation" (Hands Like Houses featuring Lynn Gunn)	No	Yes	Yes	Dissonants
2016	"Motion Sickness" (Hands Like Houses featuring Lynn Gunn)	No	Yes	No	Dissonants
2016	"Begin" (Elliot Middleton featuring Lynn Gunn)	Yes	No	Yes	—N/a
2018	"Disappear" (Tonight Alive featuring Lynn Gunn)	Yes	No	Yes	Underworld
2018	"Last Light" (Tonight Alive featuring Lynn Gunn)	Yes	No	No	Underworld
2019	"Did We Change" (From Indian Lakes featuring Lynn Gunn)	Yes	No	No	Dimly Lit
2024	"Girl$" (Stand Atlantic featuring Lynn Gunn and Bruses)	Yes	No	Yes	Was Here

== Awards and nominations ==
Year	Association	Category	Work	Result
2016	Boston Music Awards	Female Vocalist of the Year	Herself	Won
2017	APMA	Best Vocalist	Herself	Won
2018	Rock Sound Awards	Rock Sound Icon	Herself	Won
2021	Boston Music Awards	Vocalist of the Year	Herself	Won
