= Different Creatures =

Studio album by Circa Waves
- Released: 10 March 2017
- Genre: Alternative rock; indie rock
- Length: 40:01
- Label: Virgin EMI
- Producer: Alan Moulder

Circa Waves chronology
Young Chasers (2015)	Different Creatures (2017)	What's It Like Over There? (2019)

Singles from Different Creatures
- 1. "Wake Up" Released: 24 November 2016; 2. "Fire That Burns" Released: 26 January 2017

Professional ratings
Aggregate scores
Source	Rating
Metacritic	78/100
Review scores
Source	Rating
AllMusic	4.5/5 stars
Clash	7/10
DIY	4/5 stars
The Guardian	2/5 stars
Kerrang!	4/5 stars
musicOMH	3.5/5 stars
NME	4/5 stars
Q	4/5 stars

Different Creatures is the second studio album by British indie rock band, Circa Waves. The album was released 10 March 2017 through Virgin EMI Records. The Guardian newspaper's review labelled the album 'darker, denser' than their debut. ITunes: 'Growing star power and depth mark this Liverpool band’s second album'.

== Track listing ==
No.	Title	Length
1.	"Wake Up"	3:25
2.	"Fire That Burns"	3:50
3.	"Goodbye"	3:13
4.	"Out On My Own"	5:13
5.	"Different Creatures"	3:51
6.	"Crying Shame"	3:06
7.	"Love's Run Out"	2:40
8.	"Stuck"	3:33
9.	"A Night On The Broken Tiles"	4:11
10.	"Without You"	3:36
11.	"Old Friends"	3:23
Total length:		40:01

Japanese edition bonus track
No.	Title	Length
12.	"Travel Sick"	3:33
Total length:		43:34

== Charts ==
Chart (2017)	Peak position
UK Albums (OCC)	11
