= Versa (band) =

American rock duo

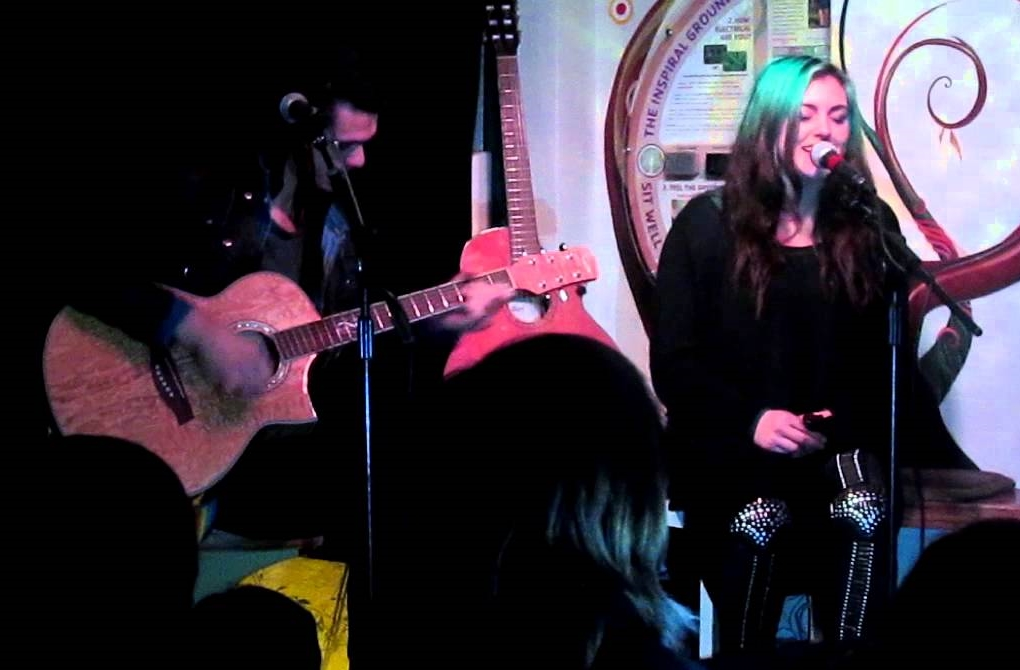
- Versa performing in 2013

Background information
- Also known as: VersaEmerge
- Origin: Port St. Lucie, Florida, U.S.
- Genres: Alternative rock; synthpop; experimental rock; emo; post-hardcore (early)
- Years active: 2006–2015
- Label: Fueled by Ramen
- Past members: Sierra Kay; Blake Harnage; Devin Ingelido; Nick Osborne; Jerry Pierce; Anthony Martone; Spencer Pearson; Anthony James; Josh Center; Ian Brown; Justin Osterhoudt
- Website: versa.fm

Versa (stylized as VERSA) was an American rock duo formed in Port St. Lucie, Florida, in 2006, as VersaEmerge. It consisted of Blake Harnage (guitar, vocals, and programming) and Sierra Kay (lead vocals). They had a revolving lineup, their most prolific being with bassist Devin Ingelido, who was a member from 2007 until 2011.

Following self-releases, the band signed with record label Fueled by Ramen in late 2008 and released the VersaEmerge EP and their full-length debut Fixed at Zero (2010), which met with positive reviews from alternative critics. The album didn't enter the Billboard 200 chart, but it ranked third on the Billboard Top Heatseekers. After changing their name to Versa, the duo self-released the EP Neon on January 21, 2014.

Although the band was considered part of the emo pop scene and compared to other emo female-fronted bands, Versa's music style included experimental rock, space rock and electronic rock, as being influenced by artist Björk and band Muse.

In a 2015 podcast, Sierra Kay announced that she and Blake were working on a new project under a new moniker, leaving Versa behind to not create confusion. The project between the two never materialized. Kay instead went on to form the shoegaze band Neaux.

== History ==
=== 2006–2009: Beginnings and early releases ===
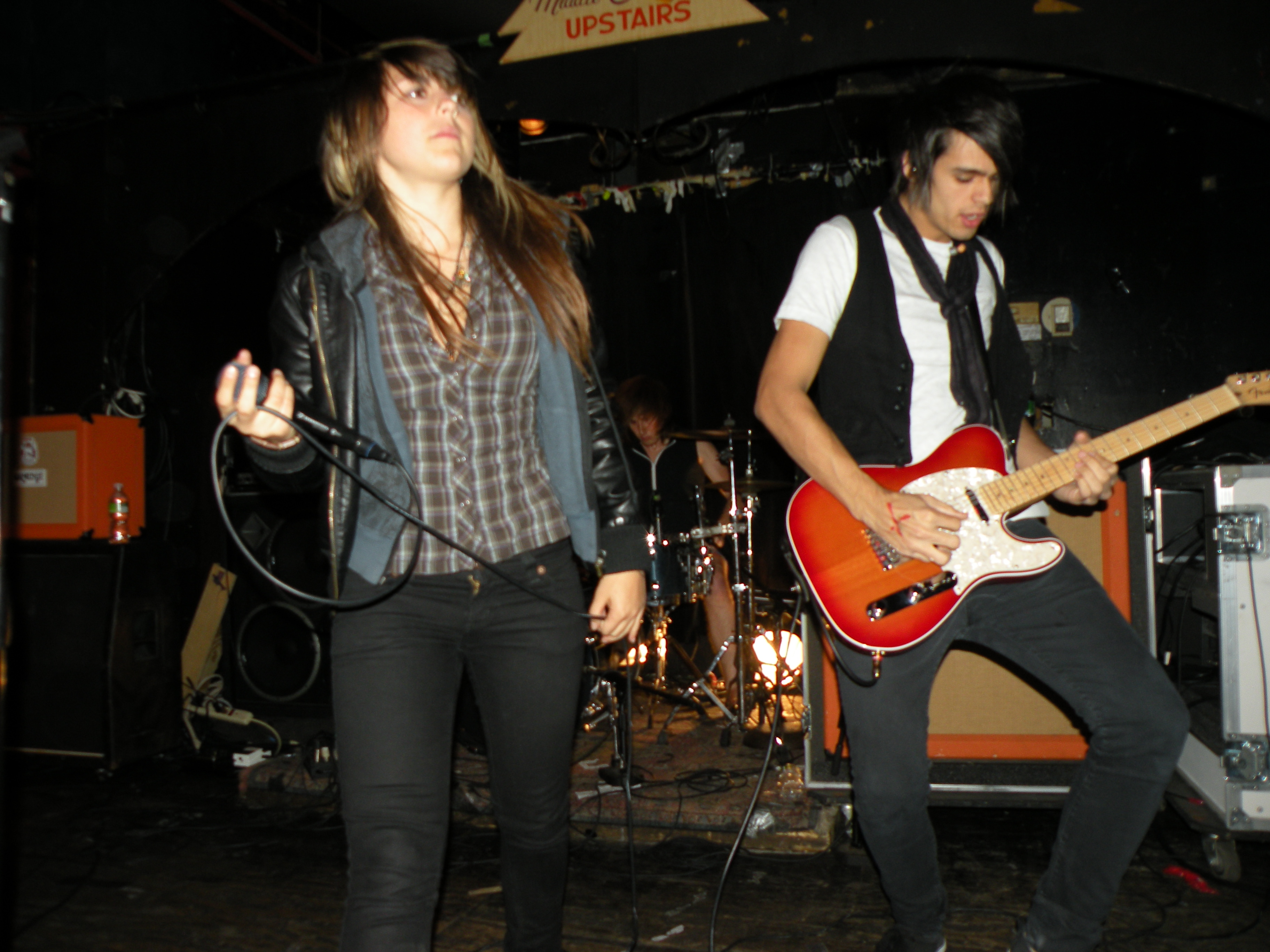
Kusterbeck and Harnage performing with VersaEmerge, October 12, 2008

Florida band VersaEmerge was formed in 2006 by Blake Harnage (guitar, backing vocals), Anthony Martone (drums), Anthony Doan (backing vocals, programming and keys), Josh Center (rhythm guitar), and Nick Osborne (bass), after the departure of the vocalist of their previous band My Fair Verona. Harnage chose the name "VersaEmerge" from the terms "vice versa", meaning opposite, and "emerge" meaning to rise up. The band recorded their first EP, Cities Built On Sand, in 2007, with new vocalist Spencer Pearson.

With the departure of the four members, the band recruited Devin Ingelido from Bury the Ashes in bass. Sierra Kusterbeck auditioned for the vocal position by sending a tape online. While the other members were not too sure about Kusterbeck, Harnage convinced them she was right for the job and she soon joined the band in 2007. Little did they know that Kusterbeck lied about her age saying she was 18 years old, when she was really 16, so she could get an audition. However, Kusterbeck later cleared this misunderstanding and explained that it was more of a mix up; she was turning 17 a week from the audition, and she said to Harnage on the phone, "I'm 17, my birthday is in a week". This was misconstrued to mean she was already 17, and was turning 18, however she actually meant she would be 17 in a week. After the recruit of Kusterbeck, VersaEmerge played local home shows and went on tour with bands such as Kiros, Our Last Night, There for Tomorrow, and Craig Owens. The band worked hard and released their first EP with Kusterbeck, Perceptions, in May 2008. They then parted with rhythm guitarist James Lano, who was then replaced by Jerry Pierce. VersaEmerge later signed to Fueled by Ramen. They began to write their self-titled EP, recording with producer James Paul Wisner. The EP was released February 3, 2009. Rumors stirred of music videos for in Pursuing Design and The Authors, two songs on the EP. In late 2011, the video for in Pursuing Design was leaked. A month after the leak, VersaEmerge still has not commented on its unplanned release.

After the release of the self-titled EP, VersaEmerge went on "The Secret Valentine Tour" with headlining bands We the Kings, The Maine, The Cab, and There for Tomorrow. After the Secret Valentine Tour, VersaEmerge grew a larger fan base and got picked to play 2 of 4 dates of the Give It a Name 2009 festival in the United Kingdom with bands such as Taking Back Sunday, Underoath, Thursday, Escape the Fate, and Innerpartysystem. They returned to the United States and almost immediately left for Bamboozle in New Jersey. When they returned to their homes in Florida, they began writing for their LP for a few months before leaving for Warped Tour '09. After The Warped Tour, they headed to Malibu to record and write for their LP, then packed up for the OP tour featuring headliner Boys Like Girls, and co-headliners Cobra Starship, The Maine, and A Rocket to the Moon.

On September 19, 2009, drummer and co-founding member, Anthony Martone, announced his split with the band through his Twitter saying "I'm no longer in VersaEmerge. Thanks for all your support. I am currently a drummer for hire, thanks everyone..." After about a week of fan speculation in regards to Martone's sudden departure, bassist Devin Ingelido and the band posted blogs about their parting with Martone, stating the split was for personal reasons that will not be elaborated on. The band hired musician and friend Spencer Peterson (not to be confused with the band's former vocalist, Spencer Pearson) to fill in as a temporary replacement on drums for the OP tour Joined in latter portions of the tour by Ian Brown who came by recommendation by the Fueled by Ramen label after demonstrating his competency on the drum kit during his work on the street team for bands like Rocket to the Moon, This Providence, and Anti-Flag. On November 22, 2009, guitarist Jerry Pierce announced on Twitter that he will be leaving the band for personal reasons concerning his family. He cleared up that he remains friends with the other members, however he "just can't keep touring as much as [VersaEmerge] does." Jerry played his last show with the band on November 28, 2009. They released their debut album right before the 2010 Vans Warped Tour. Pierce was not a part of the recording process.

=== 2010–2011: Fixed at Zero ===
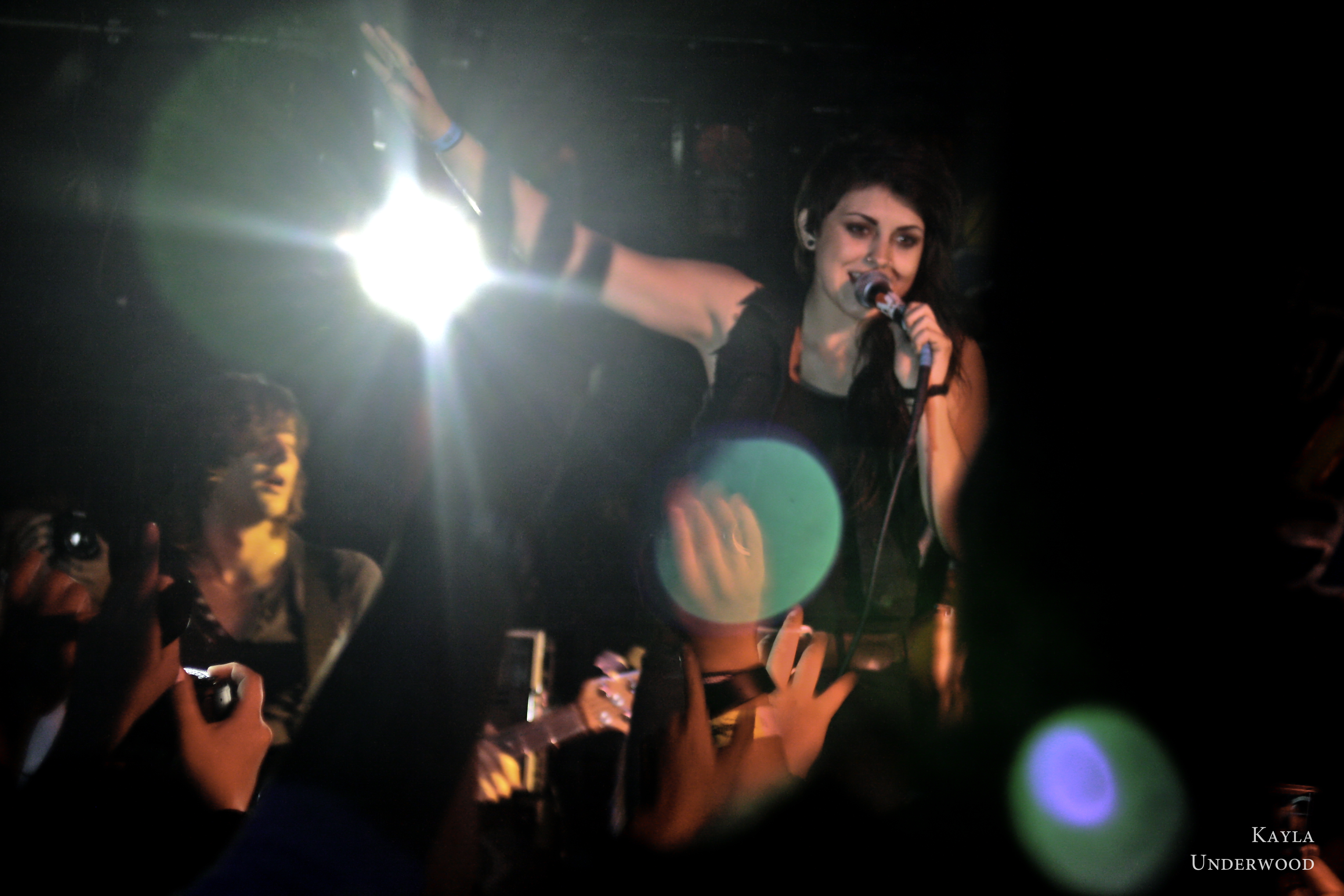
Kusterbeck performing with VersaEmerge at the Vultures United Tour, October 2010

In March 2010, VersaEmerge was named one of American music website Shred News' "10 Artists to Watch in 2010". At the SXSW Purevolume house, VersaEmerge played four new songs; "Fixed at Zero," "Mind Reader," "Figure it Out", and "You'll Never Know", all from the upcoming album. Sierra Kusterbeck was also featured in the "Front and Center: The New Class of 2010" article of the May issue of Alternative Press. According to a couple of tweets, Chris Pollock, formerly of Maryland-based band Oh, The Story! is currently filling in as the drummer for the band. It has not been announced whether this is permanent or temporary.

The band was featured on the compilation album Punk Goes Classic Rock with a cover of The Rolling Stones' "Paint it Black". On April 26, 2010, the band posted that the name of their debut album would be called Fixed at Zero. A clip of "Fixed at Zero" was also posted on the website www.fixedatzero.com. On April 28, 2010, fixedatzero.com posted the album cover, and pre-order information, with a release date of June 22, 2010, for the album. VersaEmerge went out to support the release of the album by playing The Bamboozle on May 1, 2010, playing alongside such bands as label-mates Paramore as well as Weezer. They also co-headlined a tour with I See Stars in the mid spring.

VersaEmerge completed their second full run on the Vans Warped Tour that began June 25, 2010, in California. They played the Glamour Kills Stage the entire tour. Kusterbeck also played a game called Where the Fuck is Sierra? with fans on every date of the tour. The game was similar to hide and seek and the first ten fans to find her received a winning card which was also a cut the line pass for their signing. On July 27, 2010, the band released the music video for the title track and first single from Fixed at Zero on their Myspace page. It was later made available on YouTube. On September 13, 2010, VersaEmerge announced that they would be headlining a tour in Fall '10 called the Vultures Unite Tour. They were joined by Anarbor, The Dangerous Summer and Conditions. The tour hit small venues across the US and also had two Canadian dates. It was claimed to be a "cinematic experience". The Dangerous Summer left the tour due to an altercation between Ingelido and members of The Dangerous Summer, as well as previous issues disclosed on Kusterbeck's Tumblr page.

The band appeared on the MTV documentary show World of Jenks on October 18, 2010. After the episode aired, VersaEmerge's fan base had grown substantially. On December 10, 2010, Alternative Press announced that VersaEmerge would be one of five bands on the 2011 Spring Alternative Press Tour. Joined by VersaEmerge are Black Veil Brides, Conditions, D.R.U.G.S. and I See Stars. In December 2010, former drummer Anthony Martone posted a personal account explaining his departure from the band, revealing that his tendencies to butt heads with Kusterbeck prompted his dismissal. This departure lead to Ian Brown's increased involvement in the band including recording and touring. On April 26, 2011, band member Devin Ingelido announced he was leaving the band to spend more time with his wife and newborn son. His last show was on May 7, 2011. Nick Osborne (2005–2006) will be replacing him on bass for the UK/Euro Invasion tour. Later on it was announced that Nick Osborne will be coming back to the band as the bass player for VersaEmerge.

On August 23, 2011, they released Live Acoustic. VersaEmerge was the opening act at the Fueled By Ramen 15th Anniversary show on September 9, 2011. It was also their last scheduled show for the year 2011. On November 29, the band streamed their cover of "Santa Baby" on YouTube. It would be made available on iTunes on December 20. The music video for the song premiered on PureVolume on December 6, 2011. The band performed at the Soundwave Festival from February 25, 2012 – March 5, 2012.

=== 2011–2015: Departure from Fueled By Ramen, name change and Neon ===
Once they returned to the U.S. they entered the studio to record with producer Shaun Lopez. VersaEmerge were officially done recording the album early in the morning on May 5, 2012.

The band included a preview of a song that will be on the second album titled Another Atmosphere on the Fueled By Ramen Bamboozle sampler. On July 16 VersaEmerge streamed a new song on SoundCloud called "No Consequences." On July 25 a clip of the song "Bones" from the new album was streamed on SoundCloud. A clip of the song "Domesticated" was also released on July 28 via SoundCloud. However, the band delayed the release to early 2013. On September 25, a track titled "Burn" was uploaded onto SoundCloud, and was made available to iTunes on September 27. The video of "Bones" was released on YouTube December 20.

In July 2013, the band was released from their record label, Fueled By Ramen. On October 29, 2013, the band posted on their Tumblr the video for their song "No Consequences", and said that the song was to be the band's last release under the name VersaEmerge. They also stated that new music was to be released before the end of 2013 under the band's new name, Versa.

In November 2013, Versa announced that a new EP entitled Neon would be released on January 21, 2014. The three-song EP includes otherwise unreleased songs from Another Atmosphere. The first single as Versa, "Neon," was released on November 22, 2013.

In June 2015, Sierra confirmed that the duo were ready to begin working on a new release following Neon in a new studio that Blake would be building in Brooklyn, New York, but that they would go under a new moniker and completely abolish the name VERSA. In the same interview, she also confirmed the band had created a second full-length album titled Another Atmosphere whilst they were under the name of VersaEmerge, but that their label at the time, Fueled By Ramen, never signed it off and it is unlikely they will ever release it.

== Influences ==
The band has cited Björk, Muse, Imogen Heap and Guy Sigsworth as their favorite artists, the last of which got interested in the band and contributed on the song "Up There" from Fixed at Zero. Blake stated that he's also "into movie soundtracks, film scoring, so I try and incorporate that as much as possible (...) But we have different influences from different things, not just bands."

== Band members ==
Final lineup

- Sierra Kay – lead vocals (2007–2015)
- Blake Harnage – lead guitar, vocals, programming (2006–2015), rhythm guitar (2006, 2006–2007, 2009–2015), bass (2006, 2011–2015), drums, percussion (2009–2015)

Former members

- Anthony James – keyboards, programming, unclean vocals (2005–2007)
- Josh Center – rhythm guitar (2005–2007) , bass (2006)
- Spencer Pearson – lead vocals (2005–2007)
- Nick Osborne – bass (2005–2007)
- James Lano – rhythm guitar (2008–2008)
- Anthony Martone – drums, percussion (2005–2009)
- Jerry Pierce – rhythm guitar (2008–2009)
- Devin Ingelido – bass (2008–2011)
- Ian Brown – drums, percussion (2010–2012)

Touring musicians

- Chris Kamrada – drums, percussion (2012)
- Ian Brown – drums, percussion (2010–2012)
- Chris Pollock – drums, percussion (2010–2011)
- Spencer Peterson – drums, percussion (2009)
- Nick Osborne – bass (2011–2012)

Timeline

== Discography ==
=== Studio albums ===
Year	Album	Chart positions
Year	Album	Top Heatseekers
2010	Fixed at Zero: Released as VersaEmerge: June 22, 2010; Label: Fueled by Ramen	3

=== EPs ===
Year	Album
2007	Cities Built on Sand: Released as VersaEmerge: November 11, 2007; Label: Self-released
2008	Perceptions: Released as VersaEmerge: July 2, 2008; Label: Self-released
2009	VersaEmerge: Released as VersaEmerge: February 3, 2009; Label: Fueled by Ramen
2011	Live Acoustic: Released as VersaEmerge: August 23, 2011; Label: Fueled by Ramen
2012	Another Atmosphere Preview: Released as VersaEmerge: July 31, 2012; Label: Fueled by Ramen
2014	Neon: Released: January 21, 2014; Label: Self-released

=== Singles ===
- "In Pursuing Design" (2007)
- "Past Praying For" (2009)
- "Whisperer" (2009)
- "Fixed at Zero" (2010)
- "Your Own Love" (2011)
- "Figure It Out" (2011)
- "Lost Tree" (2011)
- "Santa Baby" (2012)
- "No Consequences" (2012)
- "Neon" (2013)
