= The Sounds discography =

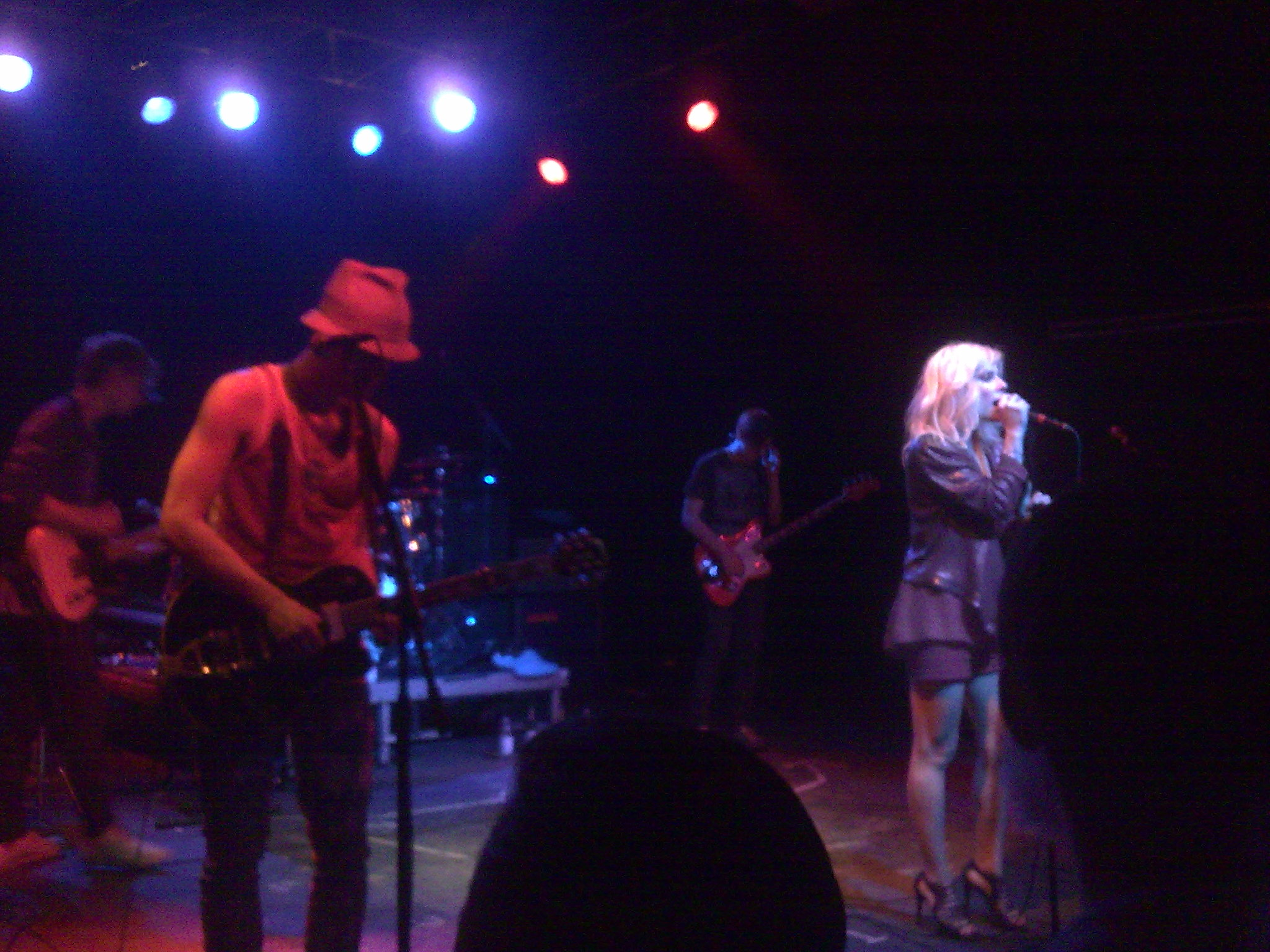
- The Sounds performing in 2009.
- Studio albums: 6
- Extended plays: 2
- Singles: 12
- Music videos: 6
- B-sides & other: 16
- Tours: 1

This is the discography of Swedish indie rock/new wave band the Sounds. Since 2002, they have released five studio albums, one EP and 11 singles.

== Studio albums ==
Year	Album	Chart positions							Certifications (sales thresholds)
Year	Album	SWE	CH	GER	FIN	NOR	UK	US	Certifications (sales thresholds)
2002	Living in America: Released: November 11, 2002; Label: New Line; Formats: CD, digital download	3	-	-	-	23	-	-	SWE: Platinum; US: +100.000
2006	Dying to Say This to You: Released: March 15, 2006; Label: New Line; Formats: CD, digital download, vinyl	8	-	-	27	-	89	107	US: +100.000
2009	Crossing the Rubicon: Released: June 2, 2009; Label: Warner Music Sweden; Formats: CD, digital download	14	-	-	4	-	-	64	
2011	Something to Die For: Release: March 29, 2011; Label: SideOneDummy Records; Formats: CD, digital download, vinyl	14	96	86	10	-	-	140	
2013	Weekend: Release: November 8, 2013; Label: Metronome Records; Formats: CD, digital download, vinyl	35	-	-	42	-	-	-	
2020	Things We Do for Love: Release: June 12, 2020; Label: Arnioki Records; Formats: CD, digital download, vinyl	-	-	-	-	-	-	-	

== Extended plays ==
Year	Album
2006	Live: Released: May 30, 2006; Label: New Line; Formats: digital download
2017	The Tales That We Tell: Released: June 16, 2017; Label: Arnioki Records, LLC; Formats: digital download

== Singles ==
Year	Title	Chart Positions				Album
Year	Title	SWE	SWE Tracks	FIN	UK	Album
2002	"Fire" / "Hit Me!"	26	-	-	-	Living in America
2002	"Living in America"	3	2	-	-	Living in America
2003	"Seven Days a Week"	20	2	-	-	Living in America
2003	"Rock & Roll"	27	1	-	-	Living in America
2006	"Song with a Mission"	22	3	-	-	Dying to Say This to You
2006	"Painted by Numbers"	-	5	-	-	Dying to Say This to You
2007	"Tony the Beat (Push It)"	-	9	-	143	Dying to Say This to You
2009	"No One Sleeps When I'm Awake"	26	4	15^{[*]}	-	Crossing the Rubicon
2010	"Beatbox"	-	-	21^{[*]}	-	Crossing the Rubicon
2011	"Better Off Dead"	-	-	6	-	Something To Die For
2011	"Something to Die For"	-	-	-	-	Something To Die For
2011	"Dance with the Devil"	-	-	-	-	Something To Die For
2013	"Shake Shake Shake"	-	-	-	-	Weekend
2016	"Thrill"	-	-	-	-	-

Notes

- '* "No One Sleeps When I'm Awake" and "Beatbox" didn't chart on the Finnish Singles Chart; they did however chart on Finnish Airplay Chart ("No One Sleeps When I'm Awake") and Finnish Download Chart ("Beatbox") and chart positions are therefore taken from those charts.

=== US singles ===
- "Living in America" (2002)
- "Song with a Mission" (2006)
- "Painted by Numbers" (2006)
- "Tony the Beat" (2006)
- "No One Sleeps When I'm Awake" (2009)
- "Beatbox" (2010)

=== UK singles ===
- "Tony the Beat" (2007)
- "Painted by Numbers" UK Version (2007)

== Compilations ==
- "Painted by Numbers" is included on Gothic Magazine's The Gothic Compilation 34.
- "Rock 'n' Roll" is featured on Viva La Bands Volume 1.
- "Rock 'n' Roll" & "Dance with Me"is featured on Final Destination 2 Soundtrack.
- "Ego" is featured on Viva La Bands Volume 2.
- "Queen of Apology" is featured on Final Destination 3 Soundtrack.
- "Queen of Apology", remixed by Patrick Stump of Fall Out Boy, is featured on the Snakes on a Plane soundtrack.
- "Something to Die For" & "Yeah Yeah Yeah", are feature on the Scream 4 Soundtrack.

== Demos ==
- "Under My Skin"
- "Bombs Bombs Away" (Alt. version)
- "Turn Back the Time (Breathe)"
- "Go! (You Will Never See Me Down Again)"
- "Come Inside (Stora)"
- "She Moves"
- "Free, Free, Free"
- "Like a Lady" (Demo version)
- "Fire" (Demo version)
- "24 Hour Love"
- "You Will Never See Me Down Again"

== B-sides and other ==
- "Bombs Bombs Away (Teenage Battlefield)" (from the German movie Big Girls Don't Cry)
- "Goodbye 70s" (B-side available on the Japanese release of Dying To Say this to You)
- "Goodbye 70s" (Alt. Version)
- "Night After Night (Reggae Version)" (Extremely Rare and Live Exclusive)
- "Song with a Mission" (Dance Mix)
- "Berkeley" (B-side for Painted By Numbers)
- "Rock and Roll" (The Pop Rox Mix)
- "Dreaming" (Blondie Tribute concert)
- "Blue Motorbike" (Live performance with Moto Boy)
- "Ego" (Alan Moulder UK Mix)
- "We Are Your Friends" (Live performance)
- "Tony the Beat" (Rex the Dog remix)
- "All My life" (Performed by Krezip – Written by Jacqueline Govaert – Jesper Anderberg – Felix Rodriguez)
- "Play This Game with Me" (Performed by Krezip – Written by Jacqueline Govaert – Jesper Anderberg – Felix Rodriguez)
- "You're Wrong" (Performed by Krezip – Written by Jacqueline Govaert – Jesper Anderberg – Felix Rodriguez)
- "Go to Sleep" (Performed by Krezip – Written by Jacqueline Govaert – Jesper Anderberg – Felix Rodriguez)

== Tours ==
- Crossing the Rubicon World Tour
