= Dirty Work (All Time Low album) =

Studio album by All Time Low
- Released: June 6, 2011
- Recorded: March–July 2010; November 2010; January 2011
- Studios: Sear Sound, New York City; Avatar, New York City
- Genres: Pop rock; power pop; emo pop; pop-punk; alternative rock
- Length: 40:32
- Label: Interscope
- Producers: Mike Green; John Fields; Matt Squire; Butch Walker; David Kahne; U4L

All Time Low chronology
Straight to DVD (2010)	Dirty Work (2011)	Don't Panic (2012)

Singles from Dirty Work
- 1. "I Feel Like Dancin'" Released: April 5, 2011; 2. "Forget About It" Released: August 15, 2011; 3. "Time-Bomb" Released: January 6, 2012; 4. "Guts" Released: May 14, 2012

Dirty Work is the fourth studio album by American rock band All Time Low. Following the success of Nothing Personal, the band signed to major label Interscope Records in late 2009. After spending sometime writing material in Los Angeles, the band started recording with Mike Green in March 2010. Over the following months the band recorded songs with John Fields, Butch Walker, Matt Squire, David Kahne and U4L. In between sessions, the band embarked on the Bamboozle Roadshow tour. Neal Avron mixed the majority of the album's recordings while Green, Mark Trombino and Chris Lord-Alge each mixed a song. Vocalist/guitarist Alex Gaskarth co-wrote the album's songs with a variety of people, including those who produced a few of the songs. While recording, the album was planned for release in 2010. It was delayed to January 2011, and then to spring. Further recording sessions then took place in November 2010, as well as in January 2011.

Following these extra sessions, the album was then slated for release in March 2011. Between March and May, the band went on tours of the UK and the US. While on the tour, "I Feel Like Dancin'" was released as a single, and the album was reportedly going to be released in June. Dirty Work was eventually released on June 7. In July, the band appeared at the Sonisphere and Oxegen UK festivals and embarked on a North America tour, which lasted into August. During the tour, "Forget About It" was released as a single. The band went on a US tour in October and November, as well as appearing on Conan. After the tour's conclusion, music videos were released for "Time-Bomb" and "Merry Christmas, Kiss My Ass" in November and December, respectively. "Time-Bomb" was released as a single in January 2012, before the band went on a UK tour, which ran into February. A Canadian tour followed shortly afterwards and "Guts" was released as a single.

Dirty Work received a mixed-to-positive reception from critics. It was projected to sell 50–55,000 copies in its first week and chart within the top 10 of the Billboard 200, before eventually selling 43,000 copies and reaching number six. The album charted highly on a number of Billboard charts, even reaching number one on both the Alternative Albums and Top Rock Albums charts. It also charted at various positions in Australia, Canada, UK, Ireland, Japan, the Netherlands and Belgium. "I Feel Like Dancin'" and "Time-Bomb" both reached the top 40 on several Billboard charts.

== Background ==
In February 2009, it was reported that All Time Low had signed to major label Interscope Records. However, the following month, vocalist/guitarist Alex Gaskarth denied this. The band released their third album, Nothing Personal in July of that year through independent label Hopeless Records, which sold 63,000 copies in its first week of release, debuting at number four on the Billboard 200. The band later confirmed they signed to Interscope Records in November. Guitarist Jack Barakat said signing to the label gave the band "a bunch of new resources", such as being able to "write with people that we could never write with before, recording with people, getting certain mixers/producers and everything." Gaskarth found the transition "[not] too difficult", but noting that it "definitely different though".

Gaskarth mentioned how they went from being one of the biggest groups on a label who had a small amount staff and could provide their complete attention, to a major label "and we're definitely not the biggest fish in that pond. There's a lot going on, it takes a little bit longer to get things done and get things moving." He added that the band thought they "hit a ceiling" with Hopeless Records since "trying to tackle things like getting radio [airplay] and things like that was sort of becoming harder and harder based on the fact that the label hadn’t really done it before." In December, the band began writing for their next album. The band demoed around 20 songs for inclusion on their next album before whittling the number down, with the aim of recording 15 or 16 of them. After touring in Australia as part of the Soundwave festival in February and March 2010, Gaskarth spent time writing new material in Los Angeles.

== Recording ==
On March 24, 2010, All Time Low began recording their next album with Mike Green. A studio update video was posted on April 1, showing the band recording new material. Further video updates were posted on April 18 and May 13. Following this, the band toured throughout the remainder of May and most of June as part of the Bamboozle Roadshow 2010. Another video update was posted on June 16. On June 27, Gaskarth revealed that eight songs had been recorded and that they would record a few more with Matt Squire, after the conclusion of Bamboozle Roadshow tour in July. On July 13, the band said 10–12 tracks would be on the album. On July 29, Gaskarth announced via Twitter that they had finished recording the album, having recorded 14 songs. Mixing took place in August, with the majority of the album's recordings being mixed by Neal Avron. In addition, Mark Trombino mixed "No Idea".

Following this, the band sent the finished album to the label in September. SonicScoop reported in November 2010 that the band were doing overdubs with Green, who was producing and engineering, in Studio A at Sear Sound in New York. The band previously made a demo of "Merry Christmas, Kiss My Ass" with Dan Book. Scott Stallone of U4L added electronic drums, rock samples and synthesizers to it. While working with Green, the band remade the track: re-doing guitars, replacing the old drums with new live drums, as well as new vocals, but retained a number of sounds that Stallone had added. SonicScoop also reported that in January 2011 that the band had recently recorded in Studio C at Avatar Studios with producer David Kahne and engineer Roy Hendrickson with assistance from Aki Nishimura. Ted Jensen mastered the album at Sterling Sound in New York City.

Green produced "Do You Want Me (Dead?)", "I Feel Like Dancin'", "Guts", "Under a Paper Moon", "Return the Favor", "No Idea", "A Daydream Away", "Heroes" and "Get Down on Your Knees and Tell Me You Love Me". John Fields produced "Forget About It". Squire produced "Time-Bomb" and "My Only One". Butch Walker produced "Just the Way I'm Not". Kahne produced "That Girl", to which Green provided additional production and was mixed by Chris Lord-Alge. U4L produced "Merry Christmas, Kiss My Ass", which was mixed by Green. Asked about the choice of using several producers, Barakat said "We're all about using multiple producers on our records. ... I'm not 100% into the one producer/one record thing because you get a lot of the same sounding songs. It's cool to have a bunch of variety." Gaskarth added "working with a lot of different producers is good, because it pulls you in all kinds of new directions." He added that, similar to Nothing Personal, they "kinda split up the [recording] with different producers that we wanted to work with in the past, but for scheduling or monetary reasons, we couldn’t lock them in for the whole record."

== Composition ==
=== Overview ===
Barakat said the writing process consisted of Gaskarth "writing songs and us going into the studio to put in our two cents and changing a couple things around." In an interview with Just So You Know, Gaskarth said the album title "summarizes the theme of the songs, most of which centralize around escapism; running from my problems, burning bridges because of those problems; and the realization that its hard work to rebuild after those problems have torn people apart." In an interview with MTV, Gaskarth said that the title was inspired "by the subject matter on the record, where it's this toss-up of being wrapped up in what we do, and having the fun and the good times, and kind of pulling that blindfold down in order to ignore the fact that other problems are crumbling around you". Gaskarth also said "one of the big things that came along with this album ... [was] a lot of anxiety. About where were we going to go". Gaskarth said the band purposely sought to "step outside of the box and do some things that were a bit scary." He mentioned that "there's one [track] that starts with classical guitar playing something that sounds like it could be out of vaudeville and it's that kind of thing that we really decided to go for on this record."

The album's sound has been described as emo pop, pop, pop rock, and power pop. Gaskarth felt the album was "more of a pop-rock/alt-rock album for us. There are definitely elements of pop punk—where we came from. But this album was an effort to develop our sound and hone in on [sic] great songwriting rather than conform to the boundaries of a certain genre." Gaskarth mentioned that they "took influence from our older stuff in some of the songs, but in others we went in a new direction, whether that was poppier or more rock or just weird." Gaskarth added that "We stripped a lot of the bells and whistles out this time and I think the songs are better off for it." Barakat said the album was "a good mix of faster type typical ATL songs and also some slow ballad type songs." He added "there are a lot of pop songs, as well as a lot rock songs. There isn’t a mix of the two. I think they are a lot more distinguished this time around."

=== Tracks ===
The band's manager suggested they write a song with Green early on in the writing process. Gaskarth ended up writing "Do You Want Me (Dead?)", "Guts", "Under a Paper Moon", "A Daydream Away" and "Get Down on Your Knees and Tell Me You Love Me" with Green within three days. Barakat said the pair had "an amazing chemistry together. He added this sweet dynamic to the band we never had before. He made us think in ways we never would have thought before." "Forget About It" was written by Gaskarth and Fields. "Time-Bomb" was written by Gaskarth, Bouvier, Comeau and Squire. "Just the Way I'm Not" was written by Gaskarth and Butch Walker. "Return the Favor" was written by Gaskarth, Jacob Lutrell and Daniel Lutrell. "No Idea" was written by Gaskarth, Christopher "Tricky" Stewart and Terrius Nash. "That Girl" and "My Only One" were written by Gaskarth and Squire. Barakat said Gaskarth and Squire "are great writers ... They just have an amazing chemistry together." "Heroes" was written by Gaskarth and John Feldmann. "Merry Christmas, Kiss My Ass" was written by Gaskarth, Book and Alexei Misoul.

According to Gaskarth, "Do You Want Me (Dead?)" is a up-tempo track that begins the album with "a great guitar hook and lots of energy." He said the song talks about "feeling like you're being stretched to your limits by somebody. Gaskarth visited Weezer frontman Rivers Cuomo at his house and ended up co-writing "I Feel Like Dancin'". He called Cuomo "such a cool guy to work with." Gaskarth said the track was "an ode to having a good time and not taking yourself too seriously." Barakat called the track "a great song ... It has a cool Weezer/All Time Low/party hybrid-vibe to it." Gaskarth said "Forget About It" details "that place in a relationship where people have been together for a really long time and they're afraid to let go." Despite this, he said it was "a totally fun song." Gaskarth said "Guts" was "about finding within yourself the ability to say and do what you want no matter what the repercussions might be." Maja Ivarsson from The Sounds provides guest vocals on the track. Gaskarth said Ivarsson was "someone I’ve always respected vocally". He added that the pair "both sound really similar ... she definitely sounds like a girl and I sorta sound like a girl so there’s a weird mix that happens but trust me it works for the song." He called the track "a departure for us as it's more universal and timeless than we've ever been."

"Time-Bomb" was originally written by Gaskarth along with Squire, Bouvier and Comeau for a Simple Plan song. However, during the writing process they deemed it more of an All Time Low song. Gaskarth was then featured on the Simple Plan song "Freaking Me Out" from Simple Plan's Get Your Heart On! album. Gaskarth said the track "paints a picture of a relationship in trouble, symbolised by a bomb that's about to go off." According to Barakat, the track was "the perfect song to bridge the gap" between Nothing Personal and Dirty Work. Gaskarth said "Just the Way I'm Not" was an ode to Def Leppard, going as far to include a snare sample from one of their songs on the track. It talks about how "relationships don't always work out as perfectly as a Top 40 hit would have us believe." He called it "a fun song, but a very personal one" with a "huge, anthemic chant-along chorus." According to Gaskarth, "Under a Paper Moon" was inspired by Ella Fitzgerald's "It's Only a Paper Moon" where she "talks about how when this person she wants around isn't with her everything feels fake ... I wanted to adopt and modernise [that concept]." With "Return the Favor", Gaskarth was "thinking way outside of the box", mentioning that it was inspired by vaudeville and Queen. The track was initially composed on piano and then the band "built the rock on top." It talks about "wanting someone to return the feelings you have for them, but to no avail."

"No Idea" is based upon the film Inception (2010), specifically the scene where the character Dom Cobb has a dream relationship with his wife. Gaskarth said it was "actually something I can relate to, as there is someone from my past I'm distanced with now and the only at I can revisit that time is in my dreams. It made for a cool song." Gaskarth called "A Daydream Away" the "kind of front porch, snare brushes and acoustic guitar slow jam I always wanted to write." He added the lyrics were "very personal" and said it is a "good song to put on when you miss somebody and just want to relax." Gaskarth called "Heroes" the "no-so-find farewell closer" that is also the "most pop-punk song" on the record, in tribute to their roots. He classed it as an ironic song since it mocks the concept of "people idolising bands and all the drama that goes along with that when those bands try to evolve their sound as they grow up." He said it was an "important final song and point to make for this album specifically as we've really taken some risks and stretched ourselves." The title of "Merry Christmas, Kiss My Ass" comes from the film National Lampoon's Christmas Vacation (1989).

== Release ==
Early in the recording process, Kerrang! reported that the band's new album would be released sometime in 2010. Towards the end of the recording process, Gaskarth said the album would be released in January 2011. On August 17, a demo was posted online of the track "Actors". Gaskarth said he posted it because he "thought people should hear it." He said that the song wouldn't fit on Dirty Work since it "didn't represent the theme of the new album closely enough." After appearing at Reading and Leeds Festivals in August, the band returned to the studio to finalise the album's track listing in September. In October and November, the band went on a headlining club tour in the US with support from A Rocket to the Moon and City (Comma) State. The band held a contest where five fans could hear the new album at each stop on the tour. On October 18, the album's title as revealed: Dirty Work. In November, Barakat revealed that the album's release date had been pushed back to early spring and that the majority of the album's songs were mixed. In December, "Merry Christmas, Kiss My Ass" was made available for streaming. In January 2011, Gaskarth said the group were sorting out the track order and working on the album's artwork. He also said that the album was originally going to be released in the same month, "but now it looks like we’re going to have to push it back" and were aiming for its release between January and March. During an interview in early February, Gaskarth stated that the band were currently approving artwork. He went on to say: "the record is slated to be released in late March so I would expect people to start hearing something in the next few weeks."

Gaskarth stated in another interview: "We never actually gave an official release date; it's all been left to speculation and stretching of the facts. At this point, its looking more like the record will come out a bit later than March, but I think folks can still expect to hear some new material in the coming weeks." On February 9, 2011, Gaskarth posted a new song, titled "Art of the State", on his Twitter. Gaskarth said that "people are chomping at the bit for something new. ... I just tossed a little fuel on the flames." Despite speculation that it would be the intro to the album, Gaskarth clarified that it was "more of an ending to the story. We pulled a [Quentin] Tarantino." On February 14, while on tour, the band played a new song entitled "Time-Bomb". On February 16, Gaskarth stated that the "record's definitely not coming out in March" due to the "restructuring" of Interscope Records and a number of records have been pushed back, Dirty Work being one of them. In a later interview, Gaskarth presumed "a bunch of people got fired. We just wanted to make sure we didn't get caught up in that shit storm essentially, so we decided to hold off on putting the record out." "Time-Bomb" was made available for streaming on February 26. In March, the band went on a UK tour alongside Yellowcard and Young Guns. In mid-March, Barakat stated in an interview with AbsolutePunk that All Time Low will "hopefully be releasing the track-listing shortly, maybe even clips of every song." He went on to say that a single hadn't been picked, though mentioned that "I Feel Like Dancin" was "in the running and will most likely be released as a single at some point, we're just not sure if it will be the first one."

On March 22, 2011, All Time Low exclusively unveiled the artwork for Dirty Work through Alternative Press. From late March to early May, the band went on the Dirty Work Tour with support from Yellowcard, Hey Monday, and the Summer Set. While on the tour, the band performed a new track titled "Under the Paper Moon". On March 23, NME reported that the album would be released in May. Two days later, the band revealed the album's track listing. On April 1, AbsolutePunk reported that Dirty Work would be released in June. "I Feel Like Dancin'" was made available for streaming on April 4, before released as single a day later. In mid-April, a music video was filmed for "I Feel Like Dancin'". The video was later released on May 23, directed by Matt Stawski. Gaskarth explained the video was "taking a stab at the music industry, how it works and the sort of things and extents people go to become successful." Dirty Work was released on June 7 through Interscope Records. "I Feel Like Dancin'" was released to mainstream radio on June 14. On June 17, the band appeared on Hoppus on Music, performing "Do You Want Me (Dead?)" and "I Feel Like Dancin'". In early July, the band appeared at the Sonisphere and Oxegen festivals in the UK. On July 12, a music video was released for "Forget About It", directed by Jonathan Bregel. The video consists of behind-the-scenes footage of the band at backstage and radio appearances, among other things.

In July and August 2011, the band toured across North America on the Gimme Summer Ya Love tour. The band were supported by Mayday Parade and We Are the In Crowd for the majority of the tour, while the Starting Line, Cartel, the Cab and Brighter appeared on select dates. On August 15, the song "Forget About It", was released as a single. In late August, the band appeared at the Reading and Leeds Festivals. In early September, a music video was filmed for "Time-Bomb". In late September and early October, the band toured Australia as part of the Soundwave Counter-Revolution festival. In October and November, the band went on the Rise and Fall of My Pants tour in the US with support from the Ready Set, He Is We and Paradise Fears. On October 19, the band performed "Time-Bomb" on Conan. In mid-November, the band revealed they were working on music video for "Merry Christmas, Kiss My Ass". Also in mid-November, it was reported that Big Time Rush had stolen the chorus to "No Idea" for their song of the same name. All Time Low and their management initially stated that permission was not granted for the use of the chorus. However, shortly afterwards Gaskarth clarified that representatives of Big Time Rush asked if they could do their own version of "No Idea", to which Gaskarth said "we were totally cool with". On November 30, the music video for "Time-Bomb" was released, directed by Asher Levin. The music video for "Merry Christmas, Kiss My Ass" was released on December 8, directed by Jon Danovic. On January 6, 2012, "Time-Bomb" was released as a single. In January and February, the band went on a UK tour with support from the Maine and We Are the In Crowd. This was followed by a tour of Canada with Simple Plan. "Guts" was released as a radio single on May 14.

== Reception ==
Professional ratings
Aggregate scores
Source	Rating
Metacritic	67/100
Review scores
Source	Rating
AbsolutePunk	74%
AllMusic	3.5/5 stars
Alternative Press	3/5 stars
Blare	2.5/4 stars
Entertainment Weekly	B+
idobi	2/5
Kerrang!	3/5 stars
Rock Sound	7/10
Rolling Stone	3/5 stars
Sputnikmusic	2/5 stars

=== Critical response ===
Dirty Work received mixed to positive reviews from music critics. At Metacritic, which assigns a normalized rating out of 100 to reviews from mainstream critics, the album received an average score of 67, indicating "generally favorable reviews", based on 8 reviews. Entertainment Weekly gave this album a positive review, saying "Dirty Work proves you can grow up and still act like a kid, just as long as your songs are this head-rushingly catchy". AllMusic was also positive, saying "Consider Dirty Work the band's ultimate bid for mainstream acceptance, and one of their strongest pop albums to date". Alternative Press gave the album an average review, stating "Guts, featuring The Sounds' Maja Ivarsson is a synth-assisted 6/8 number loaded with urgency and lyrical poignancy" yet also notes "Other tracks feel homogenized and lifeless, as if they were focus group to death. Time-Bomb is a Metro Station-aping electro-dance number that does nothing to actually make the listener dance."

Luuux gave the album an overall average review, stating "Fast beat with electric guitar songs like "That Girl" and "I Feel Like Dancin'" (a satire song about the radio/music industry) don't have me as a fan either, but the rest of the album is worthwhile." Sputnikmusic was more negative, stating that "Similarly, there was a time when All Time Low were a genuinely exciting young pop punk band; when the songs were dynamic and Alex Fucking Gaskarth's vocals were merely double-tracked rather than layered and autotuned to fuck." idobi Radio also gave a negative review stating, "The band lost their way... This experiment went wildly out of control. The album lacks overall direction and cohesiveness." Review Rinse Repeat's review was mixed, noting that the record "Overproduced and emotionally flat, there just isn't much good to say about this album. Strange enough, All Time Low seem to be in a completely different world this time around, as tracks like "Forget About It", "Under a Paper Moon" and "I Feel Like Dancin'" show with unneeded slickness, out-of-body songwriting (not in a good way) and underachieving vocals."

=== Commercial performance and accolades ===
Dirty Work was projected to sell 50–55,000 copies and chart within the top 10 of the Billboard 200. It eventually debuted at number 6 on the Billboard 200 with 43,000 first week sales. Dirty Work has sold 107,000 copies in the US to date October 2012. Dirty Work also charted on a number of Billboard charts: number 1 on both the Alternative Albums and Top Rock Albums charts, number 3 on the Digital Albums chart and number 19 on the Tastemaker Albums chart. In addition, the album reached number 13 in both Australia and Canada, number 20 in the UK, number 31 in Ireland, number 41 in Japan, number 67 in the Netherlands and number 83 in Belgium. "I Feel Like Dancin'" reached number nine on the Rock Digital Song Sales chart number 23 on the Heatseekers Songs chart and number 39 on the Pop Songs chart. It also reached number 85 in the UK. "Time-Bomb" reached number 13 on the Rock Digital Song Sales chart and number 24 on the Heatseekers Songs chart.

Alternative Press included "Under a Paper Moon", "That Girl" and "Heroes" on their list of the band's best non-single songs.

== Track listing ==
Credits per digital booklet.

No.	Title	Writer(s)	Producer(s)	Length
1.	"Do You Want Me (Dead?)"	Alex Gaskarth; Mike Green	Green	2:46
2.	"I Feel Like Dancin'"	Gaskarth; Rivers Cuomo	Green	3:01
3.	"Forget About It"	Gaskarth; John Fields	Fields	2:49
4.	"Guts"	Gaskarth; Green	Green	3:18
5.	"Time-Bomb"	Gaskarth; Pierre Bouvier; Chuck Comeau; Matt Squire	Squire	3:30
6.	"Just the Way I'm Not"	Gaskarth; Butch Walker	Walker	3:18
7.	"Under a Paper Moon"	Gaskarth; Green	Green	3:02
8.	"Return the Favor"	Gaskarth; Jacob Lutrell; Daniel Lutrell	Green	3:41
9.	"No Idea"	Gaskarth; Christopher "Tricky" Stewart; Terrius Nash	Green	4:25
10.	"A Daydream Away"	Gaskarth; Green	Green	4:13
11.	"That Girl"	Gaskarth; Squire	David Kahne	3:11
12.	"Heroes"	Gaskarth; John Feldmann	Green	3:26
Total length:				40:32

US deluxe edition
No.	Title	Writer(s)	Producer(s)	Length
13.	"Get Down on Your Knees and Tell Me You Love Me"	Gaskarth; Green	Green	3:01
14.	"My Only One"	Gaskarth; Squire	Squire	4:23
15.	"Merry Christmas, Kiss My Ass"	Gaskarth; Dan Book; Alexei Misoul	U4L	3:19
Total length:				51:15

UK bonus track
No.	Title	Length
16.	"Time-Bomb" (acoustic)	3:28
Total length:		54:43

Japan bonus track
No.	Title	Length
17.	"I Feel Like Dancin'" (acoustic)	2:54
Total length:		57:37

Digital bonus track
No.	Title	Writer(s)	Producer(s)	Length
16.	"Bad Enough for You"	Gaskarth; Squire	Squire	3:14
Total length:				54:29

iTunes bonus track
No.	Title	Length
17.	"Time-Bomb" (acoustic)	3:28
Total length:		57:57

Best Buy exclusive version
No.	Title	Length
16.	"Weightless" (live at Best Buy)	4:02
Total length:		55:17

Hot Topic exclusive version
No.	Title	Length
16.	"Jasey Rae" (live at Hot Topic)	3:50
Total length:		55:05

Tilly's exclusive version
No.	Title	Length
16.	"Dear Maria, Count Me In" (live at Tilly's)	3:51
Total length:		55:06

Indie Record Stores exclusive version
No.	Title	Length
16.	"Damned If I Do Ya (Damned If I Don't)" (live at Indie Record Store)	3:34
Total length:		54:49

== Personnel ==
Personnel per digital booklet, except where noted.

All Time Low

- Alex Gaskarth – lead vocals, rhythm guitar
- Jack Barakat – lead guitar, backing vocals
- Zack Merrick – bass guitar, backing vocals
- Rian Dawson – drums, percussion

Additional musicians

- Maja Ivarsson – guest vocals (track 4)
- Scott Stallone – samples (track 15)

Production

- Mike Green – producer and recording (tracks 1, 2, 4, 7–10, 12, 13), additional production (track 11), mixing (track 15)
- John Fields – producer and recording (track 3)
- Butch Walker – producer and recording (track 6)
- Matt Squire – producer and recording (tracks 5 and 14)
- David Kahne – producer and recording (track 11)
- U4L – producer (track 15)
- Roy Hendrickson – engineer
- Aki Nishimura – assistance
- Neal Avron – mixing
- Mark Trombino – mixing (track 9)
- Chris Lord-Alge – mixing (track 11)
- Ted Jensen – mastering
- Varnish Studio Inc – art direction, design
- Miko Lim – photography
- Les Scurry – production coordinator

== Chart positions ==
Chart (2011)	Peak position
Australian Albums Chart	13
Belgian Albums Chart (Flemish)	83
Canadian Albums Chart	13
Dutch Albums Chart	67
Irish Albums Chart	34
Japan Albums Chart	41
Scottish Albums Chart	15
UK Albums Chart	20
US Billboard 200	6
US Billboard Alternative Albums	1
US Billboard Digital Albums	3
US Billboard Tastemaker Albums	19
US Billboard Top Rock Albums	1
