= Dying to Say This to You =

2006 studio album by The Sounds

Studio album by the Sounds
- Released: 15 March 2006
- Genres: New wave, post-punk revival
- Length: 40:32
- Label: New Line
- Producer: Jeff Saltzman

The Sounds chronology
Living in America (2002)	Dying to Say This to You (2006)	Live EP (2006)

Singles from Dying to Say This to You
- 1. "Song with a Mission" Released: 13 January 2006; 2. "Painted by Numbers" Released: 27 August 2006; 3. "Tony the Beat" Released: 2 February 2007

Professional ratings
Aggregate scores
Source	Rating
Metacritic	(68/100)
Review scores
Source	Rating
AbsolutePunk.net	(82%)
AllMusic	4.5/5 stars
The Guardian	3/5 stars
NME	(7/10)
PopMatters	(6/10)
Rocklouder	3/5 stars
Rolling Stone	2.5/5 stars
Slant Magazine	2.5/5 stars

Dying to Say This to You is the second studio album in English by Swedish new wave group the Sounds. It was released on 15 March 2006 in Sweden, followed by releases in the United States on 21 March 2006, the United Kingdom on 19 March 2007, and Japan on 11 April 2007. The album blends Swedish-influenced new wave music with a sassy and spunky delivery by vocalist Maja Ivarsson, reminiscent of Blondie. The cover depicts The Misshapes' DJ Leigh Lezark on the left and her friend Alexis Page on the right.

The song "Running Out of Turbo" was featured in a chase scene in the episode "Free Fall" of the American television show CSI: Miami, as well as an episode of the MTV reality show The Hills. The song "Queen of Apology" was remixed by Fall Out Boy vocalist Patrick Stump for the soundtrack release Snakes on a Plane: The Album. The track "Hurt You" is featured in a 2008 TV spot for Geico in the United States. The song "Tony The Beat" is playing during a party scene at Cora's house in the 2007 movie Music and Lyrics.

Upon its release, Dying to Say This to You received generally favorable reviews from music critics.

== Track listing ==
All tracks written by Jesper Anderberg, Johan Bengtsson, Maja Ivarsson, Fredrik Nilsson and Felix Rodriguez.

Original Swedish version
No.	Title	Length
1.	"Song with a Mission"	2:56
2.	"Queen of Apology"	3:05
3.	"Tony the Beat"	3:10
4.	"24 Hours"	2:40
5.	"Painted by Numbers"	3:17
6.	"Night After Night" (Acoustic version)	4:12
7.	"Ego"	2:41
8.	"Hurt You"	3:51
9.	"Much Too Long"	3:05
10.	"Running Out of Turbo"	2:45
11.	"Night After Night"	3:28
Total length:		40:32

Japanese bonus tracks
No.	Title	Length
12.	"Berkley"	2:36
13.	"Goodbye '70s"	3:35
14.	"Tony the Beat" (Rex the Dog radio version)	3:19

UK version [Enhanced]
No.	Title	Length
1.	"Song with a Mission"	2:58
2.	"Queen of Apology"	3:06
3.	"Tony the Beat"	3:22
4.	"24 Hours"	2:42
5.	"Painted by Numbers"	3:20
6.	"Night After Night" (Acoustic version)	4:14
7.	"Ego"	2:43
8.	"Hurt You"	3:51
9.	"Much Too Long"	3:07
10.	"Running Out of Turbo"	3:00

Bonus tracks*
No.	Title	Length
11.	"Night After Night" (Rock version)	3:29
12.	"Rock'n Roll"	3:54
13.	"Living in America"	3:28
14.	"Mine for Life"	4:42
15.	"Tony the Beat" (Rex the Dog radio version)	3:19
16.	"Queen of Apology" (Fall Out Boy remix)	3:09

Bonus videos*
No.	Title	Length
1.	"Tony the Beat"
2.	"Song with a Mission"

¹ Enhanced CD-ROM track remixed by Tommie Sunshine.

== Tenth anniversary tour ==
The Sounds acknowledged and celebrated the tenth anniversary of their album Dying to Say This to You with a U.S. tour (and two shows in Canada) from 15 November to 20 December 2016, performing the entire album live in its original track order; they also played their new single, "Thrill" (released 10 November 2016) as well as a few tracks from their earlier albums Living In America and Crossing the Rubicon.

== Personnel ==
The Sounds

- Jesper Anderberg – keyboards
- Johan Bengtsson – bass
- Maja Ivarsson – vocals
- Fredrik Nilsson – drums
- Felix Rodriguez – guitar

Other contributors

- Steve Beacham – engineer
- Melora Creager – cello
- Rudyard Lee Cullers – engineer
- John B. Davis – management
- Micah Gaugh – saxophone
- James Iha – producer
- Mikael Johnston – engineer
- Joe Kara – marketing
- Brad Kobylczak – engineer
- Paul Q. Kolderie – mixing
- Jason Linn – executive producer, A&R
- Stephen Murray – artwork, design, cover photo
- Alexis Page and Leigh Lezark - Cover Girls
- Jeff Saltzman – producer
- Geoff Sanoff – engineer
- Sandeep Sriram – album coordination
- Annie Stocking – backing vocals
- Adam Taylor – mix engineering
- Jeanie Tracy – backing vocals
- Howie Weinberg – mastering
- Ken Weinstein – publicity

== Charts ==
Chart performance for Dying to Say This to You
Chart (2006–2007)	Peak position
Finnish Albums (Suomen virallinen lista)	27
Swedish Albums (Sverigetopplistan)	8
US Billboard 200	107
US Independent Albums (Billboard)	9
