= Weekend (disambiguation) =

A weekend is the part of the week that is traditionally devoted to rest, rather than work.

Weekend or Week End may also refer to:

== Arts and entertainment ==
=== Music ===
==== Artists ====
- The Weeknd (born 1990), Canadian singer and songwriter
- The Weekend (Canadian band) (1998–2005), pop rock
- Weekend (Welsh band) (1981–1983), new wave
- Weekend (American band) (formed 2009), shoegaze
- Weekend (Polish band) (formed 2000), disco polo/dance

==== Albums ====
- Weekend (Underground Lovers album)
- Weekend (Kenny Lattimore album)
- Weekend (The Sounds album)
- Weekend (EP), by Young Lyre
- Weekend, an album by Kreidler
- The Weekend (album), by Smashproof
- The Weekend, an album by Hey Mercedes

==== Songs ====
- "Weekend" (Daz song)
- "Weekend" (Earth and Fire song)
- "Weekend" (Eddie Cochran song)
- "Weekend" (Mac Miller song)
- "Weekend" (Taeyeon song)
- "Weekend" (The Todd Terry Project song)
- "Weekend" (Wet Willie song)
- "Weekends" (Amy Shark song)
- "Weekends" (The Black Eyed Peas song)
- "Week End" (Lorie song)
- "Week End" (X Japan song)
- "Week End" (Gen Hoshino song)
- "The Weekend" (Jack Jones song)
- "The Weekend" (Brantley Gilbert song)
- "The Weekend" (Michael Gray song)
- "The Weekend" (Steve Wariner song)
- "The Weekend" (Stormzy and Raye song)
- "The Weekend" (SZA song)
- "Weekend", by 8stops7 from Birth of a Cynic
- "Weekend", by Bloodhound Gang from Jumping All Over the World
- "Weekend", by Flume from Skin Companion EP 2
- "Weekend", by Ladytron from Witching Hour
- "Weekend", by Last Dinosaurs from In a Million Years
- "Weekend", by Phreek and Class Action
- "Weekend", by Priory
- "Weekend", by Robin Gibb from Robin's Reign
- "Weekend", by Smith Westerns from Dye It Blonde
- "Weekend", by the Sounds from Weekend
- "Weekends", by Big Time Rush from Another Life
- "Weekends", by Freya Ridings from Blood Orange
- "Weekends", by Jonas Blue and Felix Jaehn
- "Weekends!!!", by Skrillex
- "The Weekend", by Modern Baseball from Sports
- "The Weekend", by the Wanted from Battleground

==== Festivals ====
- Weekend Festival (from 2012), a summer festival in Finland

=== Films ===
- Week-end (1935 film), a Danish film by Lau Lauritzen and Alice O'Fredericks
- Weekend (1967 film), a French film by Jean-Luc Godard
- The Weekend, 1999 film based on the novel by Peter Cameron
- Weekends (2004), an American TV film starring Amanda Detmer
- Weekend (2010 film), a Polish film by Cezary Pazura
- Weekend (2011 film), a British film by Andrew Haigh
- Le Week-End, a 2013 British film
- The Weekend (2016 film), a British comedy
- The Weekend (2018 film), an American comedy
- Weekends in Normandy, originally titled Week-ends, a French film by Anne Villacèque
- Weekends (2017 film), an American animated short

=== Plays ===
- Weekend (play), a 1968 political comedy by Gore Vidal

=== Television ===
- The Weekend (2024 TV series), a show on MS NOW (formerly known as MSNBC)
- Weekend (talk show), a 2014–2017 British breakfast entertainment/magazine show
- Weekend (1974 TV program), a 1974–1979 American television news magazine that aired on NBC
- "Weekend", an episode of the British sitcom Men Behaving Badly
- "The Weekend" (Bluey), a 2018 episode
- "The Weekend" (Citizen Smith), a 1977 episode
- "The Weekend" (Homeland), a 2011 episode

=== Novels ===
- The Weekend, 1994 novel by Peter Cameron
- The Weekend, the American release name of Dirty Weekend, a 1991 British novel by Helen Zahavi
- Weekend (novel), 2006, by William McIlvanney
- The Weekend (novel), a 2019 novel by Charlotte Wood

== Television and radio ==
- London Weekend Television, a former ITV weekend service for London
- London Weekend Radio, a pirate radio station
- Weekend-TV, a defunct Danish television station

== Publications ==
- Weekend (Ceylonese newspaper)
- Weekend (magazine) (1951–1979), a Canadian newspaper supplement

== See also ==
- Weekender (disambiguation)
- Week Ending, a BBC satirical radio series which ran from 1970 to 1998
- WKND (disambiguation), whose uses include radio station call signs or branding
- Week (disambiguation)
- End (disambiguation)
- Workweek
