= Living in America =

Living in America may refer to:

- "Living in America" (James Brown song), 1985
- Living in America (album), a 2002 album by The Sounds
- "Living in America" (The Sounds song), 2002
- "Living in America", a 2010 song by DoM
- "Living in America", a song by Fontaines D.C. from the 2020 album A Hero's Death
