= She's a Machine! =

Studio album by Alice in Videoland
- Released: 20 April 2008
- Genre: Electroclash, electropunk, synthpop
- Length: 26:59
- Label: National

Alice in Videoland chronology
Outrageous! (2005)	She's a Machine! (2008)	A Million Thoughts and They're All About You (2010)

Singles from She's a Machine!
- 1. "Numb" Released: April 15, 2008; 2. "We Are Rebels" Released: June 10, 2008

She's a Machine! is the third studio album by Swedish electronic band Alice in Videoland, released in Sweden on 20 April 2008 by National Records. German pressings of the album include a bonus disc titled A Different Perspective, which contains reworked versions of the songs on the original disc. The North American CD release includes a cover of the Guano Apes song "Open Your Eyes", as well as a single edit of "We Are Rebels" in which Maja Ivarsson's guest vocals have been removed and are instead sung by Toril Lindqvist.

== Track listing ==
1. "She's a Machine" – 2:46
2. "Mf" – 3:56
3. "Numb" – 4:14
4. "We Are Rebels" (featuring Maja Ivarsson of The Sounds) – 3:40
5. "Who's That Boy" – 3:44
6. "Candy" – 3:01
7. "Weird Desire" – 2:44
8. "Tomorrow" – 2:54

North American bonus tracks

9. "Open Your Eyes" – 3:35
10. "Numb" (Single Edit) – 3:54
11. "We Are Rebels" (Single Edit) – 3:38

German bonus disc – A Different Perspective

1. "Candy" – 3:03
2. "She's a Machine" – 3:19
3. "Mf" – 3:59
4. "Tomorrow" – 5:09
5. "Weird Desire" – 2:08
6. "Open Your Eyes" – 3:25
7. "Numb" – 4:31
8. "Who's That Boy" – 4:00

== Release history ==
Country	Date	Label
Sweden	20 April 2008	National Records
United States	10 June 2008	Artoffact Records
Germany	11 July 2008	Prussia Records
Canada	18 November 2008	Artoffact Records

== Use in other media ==
The track "We Are Rebels" is used in the Anthill Films mountain biking documentary Follow Me.
