= Things We Do for Love =

Things We Do for Love may refer to:

== Music ==
- The Things We Do for Love, a 2011 album by Joanna Wang
- "The Things We Do for Love" (song), a 1976 song by 10cc
- "Things We Do for Love", a song by Horace Brown
- "Things We Do for Love", a song by Ta-da from the 2009 film Spectacular!
- Things We Do for Love (album), the 2020 album by The Sounds
- Things We Do for Love (song), a song by Kylie Minogue

== Television ==
=== Series ===
- Things We Do for Love (TV series), a Ghanaian TV series
- The Things We Do for Love, a 2015 TV sitcom series on Urban Movie Channel, starring Alfonso Ribeiro and Tamera Mowry-Housley

=== Episodes ===
- "The Things We Do for Love" (All Saints)
- "The Things We Do for Love" (Ballykissangel)
- "The Things We Do for Love" (Beverly Hills, 90210)
- "The Things We Do for Love" (Casualty)
- "The Things We Do for Love" (Chicago Hope)
- "The Things We Do for Love" (Life on a Stick)
- "The Things We Do for Love" (McLeod's Daughters)
- "The Things We Do for Love" (A Touch of Frost)

== Theatre ==
- Things We Do for Love (play), a 1997 play by Alan Ayckbourn
