= Outrageous! (Alice in Videoland album) =

Studio album by Alice in Videoland
- Released: 5 October 2005
- Genre: Electroclash, synthpop
- Length: 33:00
- Label: National
- Producer: Anders Alexander

Alice in Videoland chronology
| Maiden Voyage (2003) | Outrageous! (2005) | She's a Machine! (2008) |

Singles from Outrageous!
- 1. "Badboy" Released: June 1, 2005; 2. "Cut the Crap" Released: September 28, 2005; 3. "Radiosong" Released: December 14, 2005

Outrageous! is the second studio album by Swedish electronic band Alice in Videoland, released in Sweden on 5 October 2005 by National Records. It features the single "Cut the Crap".

== Track listing ==
1. "Ladykiller" – 2:19
2. "Cut the Crap" – 2:59
3. "Emily" – 2:48
4. "In Denial" – 4:46
5. "Better Off" – 3:34
6. "Radiosong" – 3:35
7. "Falling" – 3:45
8. "Bad Boy" – 3:21
9. "Stuck on My Vision" – 2:49
10. "Wrapped" – 3:04

== Release history ==
| Country | Date | Label |
|---|---|---|
| Sweden | 5 October 2005 | National Records |
| United States | 18 October 2005 | Storming Records |
| Canada | 1 November 2005 | Storming Records |
