= Things We Do for Love (album) =

Studio album by the Sounds
- Released: 12 June 2020
- Genres: New wave, post-punk revival, indie rock, alternative rock, pop
- Length: 42:10
- Label: Arnioki Records

The Sounds chronology
Weekend (2013)	Things We Do for Love (2020)

Things We Do for Love is the sixth studio album by the Swedish new wave band the Sounds and was released in 2020 by Arnioki Records.

== Background ==
With most of the band members having started families since the release of the previous studio album Weekend in 2013, The Sounds went into a hiatus of seven years. In 2017, they released an EP, The Tales That We Tell, but were focused more on personal matters than on songwriting. Guitarist and keyboardist, Jesper Anderberg took a three-years break to study computer engineering. After the release of the EP, the band continued writing new tracks "and some of the songs that didn’t fit on the EP were saved for this album that we knew eventually was going to come out," said Anderberg. He also revealed that the track "Dreaming of You" was inspired by Arcade Fire. Unlike the previous The Sounds albums that had a set timeframe for writing, the creation of Things We Do for Love was stretched out over the years. Originally scheduled to be released with a tour in early 2020, the release of Things We Do for Love had to be postponed due to the restrictions of the COVID-19 pandemic.

== Reception ==
Professional ratings
Review scores
Source	Rating
AllMusic	4/5 stars
Borås Tidning	2/5 stars
Göteborgs-Posten	3/5 stars
Kulttuuri-Toimitus	3.5/5 stars

The album received mostly favourable international reviews. Göteborgs-Posten wrote that the song "Dreaming of You" was "the perfect mix of ABBA, Roxette and Ace of Base" whereas the title track "Things We Do For Love" was new wave that was highly reminiscent of Blondie. The reviewer criticised though that while singer Maja Ivarsson was "cool as ever" on this release, the rest of the band remained somewhat "anonymous". According to AllMusic, this album was The Sounds' best album since the 2011 release Something to Die For, signalling that "growth is possible nearly two decades into a career". The review cited influences of Ultravox and the Beach Boys as well as Depeche Mode. The Finnish Kulttuuri-Toimitus found that while Things We Do For Love could not match the bands debut album Living in America and could not live up to the standards of its opening track, it was still versatile in its "electronic darkness". The track "Bonnie and Clyde" was noted to stand out for being calm and not as swirling as the rest of the songs on the album. The reviewer for Borås Tidning was more reluctant. He called the album a "subtle comeback" and concluded that "Things We Do for Love never reaches the majestic heights that the British inspirers did".

== Track listing ==
No.	Title	Length
1.	"Things We Do For Love"	4:16
2.	"Safe And Sound"	3:32
3.	"Changes"	3:51
4.	"Bonnie And Clyde"	3:48
5.	"Hollow"	4:40
6.	"Fingertips"	3:20
7.	"Dreaming Of You"	3:47
8.	"Dim The Lights"	3:11
9.	"Stay Free"	2:05
10.	"Home"	3:23
11.	"Miami"	6:13
Total length:		42:10
