= Maiden Voyage (Alice in Videoland album) =

Studio album by Alice in Videoland
- Released: 19 November 2003
- Recorded: June–October 2003
- Genre: Electroclash, synthpop
- Length: 31:57
- Label: National
- Producer: Anders Alexander, Calle Lundgren

Alice in Videoland chronology
Maiden Voyage (2003)	Outrageous! (2005)

Singles from Maiden Voyage
- 1. "Dance With Me" Released: April 28, 2003; 2. "Got To Go" Released: November 19, 2003; 3. "Going Down" Released: April 21, 2004

Alternative cover
- Maiden Voyage Plus cover

Singles from Maiden Voyage Plus
- 1. "The Bomb" Released: September 24, 2003

Maiden Voyage is the debut album by Swedish electronic band Alice in Videoland, released in Sweden on 19 November 2003 by National Records. In the United States and Canada, the album was released in 2007 by Artoffact Records under the title Maiden Voyage Plus, containing remixes and B-sides as bonus tracks.

== Track listing ==
All songs written and composed by Toril Lindqvist and Calle Lundgren.

1. "Lay Me Down" – 3:03
2. "Got to Go" – 3:27
3. "Going Down" – 3:18
4. "Red" – 3:03
5. "Dance with Me" – 2:29
6. "Video Girl" – 2:55
7. "Panic" – 4:54
8. "Addicted" – 2:35
9. "Naked" – 2:27
10. "Sweet Thing" – 3:46

Maiden Voyage Plus bonus tracks

11. "Going Down" (Gabi Delgado RMX) – 5:21
12. "Player" – 2:33
13. "The Bomb" – 2:26
14. "The Bomb" (Body Version) – 3:29
15. "Lay Me Down" (Remix) – 3:57

== Personnel ==
- Anders Alexander – producer, mixing
- Henrik Jonsson – mastering
- Toril Lindqvist – music
- Calle Lundgren – producer, music, artwork
- Michael Lohse – guitar, organ, additional vocals

== Release history ==
Country	Date	Label
Sweden	19 November 2003	National Records
Canada	6 July 2007	Artoffact Records
United States	14 August 2007	Artoffact Records
