= Videoland =

Videoland may refer to:

- Videoland (Netherlands), a Dutch video on demand service owned by RTL Nederland
- Movie Gallery, a game and rental company based in Dothan, Alabama
- Videoland Television Network, a media company based in Taiwan
- Alice in Videoland, a Swedish pop group
- Videoland, the world where the Captain N: The Game Master series takes place
