= A Million Thoughts and They're All About You =

Studio album by Alice in Videoland
- Released: 18 October 2011
- Genres: Electroclash, synthpop
- Length: 37:28
- Label: Artoffact
- Producers: Anders Alexander, Lariemar Krokvik, Fredrik Lindblom, Tommy Thorell

Alice in Videoland chronology
She's a Machine! (2008)	A Million Thoughts and They're All About You (2011)

Singles from A Million Thoughts and They're All About You
- 1. "Spaceship" Released: 21 April 2010; 2. "Something New" Released: 14 June 2011

A Million Thoughts and They're All About You is the fourth studio album by Swedish electronic band Alice in Videoland, released in Sweden on 11 February 2011 by Artoffact Records. It includes the singles "Spaceship" and "Something New" as well as the hit anthem "Little Bird."

== Track listing ==
All songs written by Anders Alexander and Toril Lindqvist, except where noted.

1. "Take Me with You" – 3:10
2. "Little Bird" – 3:48
3. "Spaceship" (Alexander, Lindqvist, Lariemar Krokvik, Fredrik Lindblom, Tommy Thorell) – 3:15
4. "Something New" – 3:29
5. "In a Band" – 3:03
6. "No Matter" – 3:36
7. "Bender" (Krokvik, Lindblom, Thorell) – 3:55
8. "Last Lover" (Alexander, Lindqvist, Anton Sahlberg) – 3:21
9. "Buffalo Stance" (Neneh Cherry, Cameron McVey, Phil Ramacon, Jamie Morgan) – 3:10
10. "Spaceship" (The At Least Somewhat Censored Version) – 3:14 ^{†}
11. "Little Bird" (100 Volt Remix) – 3:27 ^{†}

^{†} Only available on the CD version.

== Personnel ==
- Anders Alexander – drums, mixing, producer, synthesizer
- Jon Axelsson – mixing
- Nanna Björnsson – backing vocals
- Sunniva Løvland Byvard – photography
- Johan Dahlbom – bass guitar, design, keyboards, layout
- Anja Dahlgren – cover photo, photography
- Martin Kenzo – guitar, keyboards
- Lariemar Krokvik – drums, mixing, producer, synthesizer
- Fredrik Lindblom – drums, mixing, producer, synthesizer
- Toril Lindqvist – vocals
- Tove Mattisson – backing vocals
- Anton Sahlberg – bass guitar, guitar
- Rachel Seow – backing vocals
- Ludwig Sersam – backing vocals
- Tommy Thorell – drums, mixing, producer, synthesizer

== Release history ==
Country	Date	Label
Canada	18 October 2010	Artoffact Records
United States	11 January 2011	Artoffact Records
Sweden	11 February 2011	Artoffact Records
