= Weightless (All Time Low song) =

Single by All Time Low

from the album Nothing Personal
- Released: April 7, 2009
- Recorded: 2009
- Genre: Pop punk
- Length: 3:18
- Label: Hopeless
- Songwriters: Jack Barakat; Rian Dawson; Alex Gaskarth; Zack Merrick; Matt Squire

All Time Low singles chronology
"Poppin' Champagne" (2008)	"Weightless" (2009)	"Damned If I Do Ya (Damned If I Don't)" (2009)

Music video
- "Weightless" on YouTube

"Weightless" is a song by American rock band All Time Low and the first and lead single from the group's third studio album Nothing Personal (2009). The single was released through Hopeless Records as a digital download on April 7, 2009, and was released in the UK on August 3, 2009. The song is also available to download on the music video games Rock Band and Guitar Hero 5. It became the first song by the band to receive radio airplay, exposing the band to a new audience, and helping it peak at No. 4 on the Bubbling Under Hot 100. The song has become a live staple, and is considered to be one of the band's signature songs along with "Dear Maria, Count Me In".

== Meaning ==
Lead vocalist and rhythm guitarist Alex Gaskarth stated in an interview with MTVu that "The whole mentality of the song is like, you feel like you're stuck in this like, negative space and you just want to get out. Summer's rolling up and uh, everybody's finishing up with school and everybody's getting like the exam beatdown".

In the Nothing Personal album trailer, Jack Barakat said that the song is about not wanting to grow up and just wanting to be a kid.

== Music video ==
The music video for "Weightless" commenced filming on May 20, directed by Matthew Stawski. Fans were invited to go on the set and be a part of the music video. It debuted on MTV, MTV2, mtvU and HITS the day before the album's release, on July 6, 2009. The video opens with Alex Gaskarth being spoken to by some groupies backstage, with text representing his inner monologue, saying things over the girls such as "Only wants your money", "Obsessed", and "Get a restraining order on her." The video continues in this manner with the camera tracking through the venue; situations include Gaskarth backstage being pampered by crew members while text says that lead singers are spoiled, and also for people such as the merchandise seller, the roadies and crew, and various crowd members (including one who thinks "I'd rather be watching Fall Out Boy.") The video also features cameo appearances by Pete Wentz, bassist of Fall Out Boy, and Mark Hoppus, bassist and vocalist of Blink-182 with a joke that Wentz tweets to Hoppus via mobile that All Time Low rips off Fall Out Boy. Hoppus then despairingly thinks to himself that both All Time Low and Fall Out Boy rip off Blink-182. The video ends with the slogan Nothing Personal, which is not only a reference to the album, but is also the theme of the video.

== Chart and certifications ==
=== Weekly charts ===
Chart (2009–2010)	Peak position
Scotland Singles (OCC)	85
UK Singles (OCC)	100
UK Indie (OCC)	8
US Bubbling Under Hot 100 (Billboard)	4

=== Certifications ===
Region	Certification	Certified units/sales
United Kingdom (BPI)	Silver	200,000^{‡}
United States (RIAA)	Platinum	1,000,000^{‡}
^{‡} Sales+streaming figures based on certification alone.
