= Lost in Stereo =

Single by All Time Low

from the album Nothing Personal
- Released: April 4, 2010
- Recorded: 2009
- Genre: Pop punk
- Length: 3:47
- Label: Hopeless
- Songwriter: Alex Gaskarth

All Time Low singles chronology
"Damned If I Do Ya (Damned If I Don't)" (2009)	"Lost in Stereo" (2010)	"I Feel Like Dancin'" (2011)

Music video
- "Lost in Stereo" on YouTube

"Lost in Stereo" is a song by American rock band All Time Low and the third and last single taken from their third studio album, Nothing Personal (2009). It was released through Hopeless Records as a digital download on April 4, 2010.

== Track list ==
1. "Lost in Stereo" – 3.47
2. "Damned If I Do Ya (Damned If I Don't) [Blueskies remix]" – 4.16
3. "Lost in Stereo (music video)" – 3.47

== Music video ==
The music video for "Lost in Stereo" shows the band playing shows from their Glamour Kills Tour in 2009, and also features clips from their "Straight to DVD" film.

== Chart performance ==
"Lost in Stereo" debuted on April 4, 2010 in the UK Singles Chart at #156, marking All Time Low's second single to impact the chart. Throughout March and April 2010, the single also climbed the UK Indie Chart and UK Rock Chart, reaching #13 and #2 respectively on April 12, 2010. On April 18 it reached #63 on the UK singles chart.

Chart (2010)	Peak Position
UK Singles Chart	63
UK Indie Chart	13
UK Rock Chart	2
