= WKND (disambiguation) =

WKND is a radio station (1480 AM) licensed to Windsor, Connecticut, United States.

WKND may also refer to:

- WNEZ, a radio station (1230 AM) licensed to Manchester, Connecticut, United States, that previously used the callsign
- CJEC-FM, a radio station (91.9) licensed to Quebec City, Quebec, Canada, that uses "WKND" as a branding
- CJPX-FM, a radio station (99.5) licensed to Montreal, Quebec, Canada, that used "WKND" as a branding from 2020 to 2024
- WKND (album), a 2012 album by Ferry Corsten
- The Wknd, a media company in Kuala Lumpur, Malaysia

== See also ==
- Weekend (disambiguation)
