= The Misshapes =

New York City-based DJ duo

- Origin: New York City, New York, United States
- Occupations: DJs, models
- Years active: 2005–present
- Label: Opus/Universal
- Members: Geordon Nicol; Leigh Lezark

The Misshapes are a New York City-based DJ duo composed of DJs Leigh Lezark and Geordon Nicol. Previously the group consisted of Leigh Lezark, Geordon Nicol and Greg Krelenstein.

== Group history ==
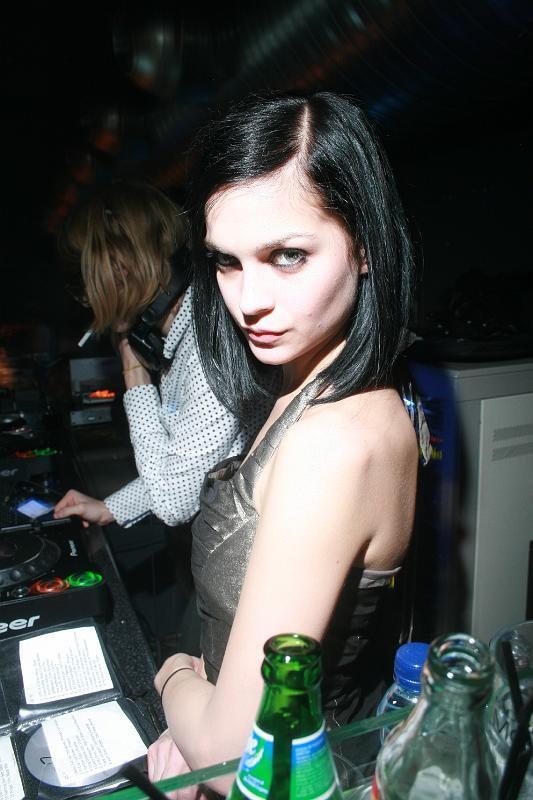
Leigh Lezark in 2008

=== Night club years, 2003–2008 ===
Leigh Lezark met Geordon Nicol and Greg Krelenstein at college, and in 2003 they formed The Misshapes. Beginning in 2004, the trio cultivated a large following when they brought the "Misshapes Dance Party" to downtown New York City. The name was taken from the title of a Pulp song, "Mis-Shapes." The party was first hosted at the apartment of Leigh Lezark on Eleventh Street in New York City. The night moved to the bar Luke & Leroy's, where Geordon and Leigh had to lie about their ages as well as falsify resumes to obtain access to the space at the time.

== Group's career ==
With the help of Gawker, the party's popularity grew. In 2005, following a performance by Madonna and Stuart Price, Misshapes experienced continued capacity issues and the party was moved to SoHo club, Don Hill's. At its new location, the event, as well as the DJs, enjoyed growing success. Downtown it-kids and celebrities partied together. Creative DIY-style flyers were created and sent around. A big part of the Misshapes party was its accompanying website, Misshapes.com. Weekly photos of the party were posted on that website, as well as portraits taken against a white wall.

DJs and Live performers included: Agyness Deyn, Alexandre Herchcovitch, Arcade Fire, Bloc Party, Cassie, Chromeo, Cory Kennedy, David Byrne, Dash Snow, Dev Hynes, The Drums, Felix da Housecat, Franz Ferdinand, Gareth Pugh, Gemma Ward, The Gossip, Hedi Slimane, Henry Holland, The Horrors, Hot Hot Heat, Interpol, James Iha, Jarvis Cocker, Jeremy Scott, Junior Sanchez, Junior Senior, Kelis, Kelly Osbourne, The Killers, Klaxons, Lady Sovereign, Ladytron, Lady Miss Kier, Le Tigre, Lily Donaldson, M.I.A, Madonna, MSTRKRFT, Nan Golden, Patrick Wolf, Peaches, Pharrell Williams, The Rapture, Rilo Kiley, Rufus Wainwright, Selma Blair, Sienna Miller, Siouxsie Sioux, The Sounds, Steve Aoki, The Strokes, These New Puritans, Uffie, The Virgins, Yeah Yeah Yeahs, and Yoko Ono.

After a 5-year run, the trio decided to discontinue Misshapes as a weekly party, but continued to produce special Misshapes events in new locations.

== Book ==
The Misshapes also expanded into publishing with the release of their eponymous stylebook. The book contains almost 300 pages of fashion portraits and over 2,500 images with photography by Julian Gilbert, Karl Lagerfeld, Leigh Lezark, Nick Haymes, Miguel Villalobos, Patrick McMullan, Ryan McGinley, Ryan Pfluger, Scott Meriam and Yeah Yeah Yeahs guitarist Nick Zinner. The book's introduction is written by Vogue magazine and Vogue.com editor Sally Singer and additional text by writer Legs McNeil, and Pulp frontman Jarvis Cocker.

== Other DJing ==
In 2008, the Misshapes began doing shows for Henry Holland. Since then the Misshapes have also DJed for Adidas, Calvin Klein, Costello Tagliapietra, Cynthia Rowley, Diesel Black Gold, Diesel Outlet, Jeremy Scott, Karl Lagerfeld, Rachel Zoe, Sophia Kokosalaki, Tory Burch, Viktor & Rolf, Zac Posen.

The Misshapes have also collaborated with brands like Chanel, Harry Winston, the Metropolitan Museum of Art, Moet & Chandon, Sotheby' and Visionaire to soundtrack installations in galleries, museums, public places and art centers.
