= Something to Die For =

Studio album by the Sounds
- Released: 29 March 2011
- Genres: New wave, post-punk revival, indie rock, synth-pop
- Length: 41:17
- Label: SideOneDummy
- Producer: The Sounds

The Sounds chronology
Crossing The Rubicon (2009)	Something to Die For (2011)	Weekend (2013)

Singles from Something To Die For
- 1. "Better Off Dead" Released: 1 February 2011; 2. "Something To Die For" Released: 22 February 2011

Something to Die For is the fourth studio album by the Swedish new wave band the Sounds. Unlike their previous albums it is dominated by electronic music leaning towards house and synthpop and was completely produced by The Sounds.

== Background ==
On January 6, 2011, the band announced that their next album would be titled Something To Die For, and was scheduled to be released the week of March 29, 2011. Lead singer Maja Ivarsson has also been confirmed as appearing on pop-punk band All Time Low's new album Dirty Work as a guest vocalist on the track "Guts".

== Singles ==
The first single from their new album, "Better Off Dead", was released on February 1, 2011. The track was promoted on their website with a competition, in which anyone could download the sheet music for the song, and submit their own version, to be voted on by fans (the winner's version will be included as the B-side on their upcoming 7"). Everyone who downloaded the sheet music also received the track for free 5 days early.

The second single, "Something to Die For", on February 22, 2011. The third single chosen was "Dance with the Devil". The latter's music video premiered on May 19, 2011.

The album's fourth and final single was "Yeah Yeah Yeah". The music video premiered on February 16, 2012.

== Reception ==
Professional ratings
Aggregate scores
Source	Rating
Metacritic	54/100
Review scores
Source	Rating
AbsolutePunk	68%
AllMusic	3.5/5 stars
The Brock Press	(neutral)
motor.de	(unfavourable)
Musikexpress	2/5 stars
Plattentests.de	3/10
Sputnikmusic	2.5/5 stars

The album has received mixed reviews. While AllMusic praised the new dancefloor style and compared the album to a mix of Roxette, U2 and the Arctic Monkeys, reviews from Germany criticised the change in style. The motor.de webzine noted the lack of originality in the album and its mainstream appearance, writing that a part of The Sounds had died with this release. Also Plattentests.de noted the change from earlier Indie rock to mainstream pop and criticised frequent repetitions in themes, an overloaded keyboard sound and a lack of drive. The overly dominant electronic noise and a lack of catchy riffs was marked by a review in The Brock Press which however called the album "radio-friendly" and compared singer Maja Ivarsson to Emily Haines from Metric. The German Musikexpress magazine called the album a "failed attempt to conquer the world of Pop". This review attributed the one-dimensional sound of the album to the fact that Something To Die For had been produced by The Sounds themselves, but it also lauded the citations of 1980s' musical style like in "Won’t Let Them Tear Us Apart".

== Track listing ==
No.	Title	Length
1.	"It's So Easy (Intro)"	2:33
2.	"Dance with the Devil"	4:47
3.	"The No No Song"	3:53
4.	"Better Off Dead"	4:55
5.	"Diana"	3:35
6.	"Something to Die For"	5:33
7.	"Yeah Yeah Yeah"	3:58
8.	"Won’t Let Them Tear Us Apart"	4:07
9.	"The Best of Me"	4:48
10.	"Wish You Were Here"	3:08
Total length:		41:17

== Soundtracks ==
The songs "Something to Die For" and "Yeah Yeah Yeah" are featured in the 2011 film Scream 4, and included on the film's soundtrack. The track "The No No Song" is also featured in episode 19 of the first season of Hawaii Five-0.

== Charts ==
Chart performance for Something to Die For
Chart (2011)	Peak position
Finnish Albums (Suomen virallinen lista)	10
German Albums (Offizielle Top 100)	86
Swedish Albums (Sverigetopplistan)	14
Swiss Albums (Schweizer Hitparade)	96
US Billboard 200	140
US Independent Albums (Billboard)	29
