= I Feel Like Dancin' =

Single by All Time Low

from the album Dirty Work
- Released: April 5, 2011
- Recorded: March–July 2010
- Genre: Pop punk
- Length: 3:01
- Label: Interscope
- Songwriters: Alex Gaskarth; Rivers Cuomo
- Producers: Mike Green; Matt Squire; Butch Walker

All Time Low singles chronology
"Lost in Stereo" (2010)	"I Feel Like Dancin'" (2011)	"Forget About It" (2011)

Music video
- "I Feel Like Dancin'" on YouTube

"I Feel Like Dancin'" is a song by American rock band All Time Low. It is the first single from their fourth studio album Dirty Work (2011) and is co-written with Weezer's Rivers Cuomo. The single was released in the United States through Interscope Records as a digital download on April 5, 2011. On May 23, the music video for "I Feel Like Dancin'" was released on Vevo exclusively. Both the song and the video satirize the mainstream music industry. "I Feel Like Dancin'" was released to mainstream radio on June 14, 2011. The song reached No. 13 on the Bubbling Under Hot 100 chart. To promote the single, the band flew to the UK and performed it along with a cover of Britney Spears's hit single "Hold It Against Me" on BBC Radio 1's Live Lounge on 24 May.

== Track listing ==
No.	Title	Length
1.	"I Feel Like Dancin'"	3:01

== Music video ==
The music video of this song satirizes today's music industry, and shows how music videos no longer relate to what the song is actually about. It begins with the group sitting with a record company executive, who is the band's actual manager. They begin to discuss making a music video, and the band states they "Have some good ideas". The executive tells them that All Time Low will use his methods for making a successful video. Method one is product placement, and he surrounds the band members with Rockstar products. Method two is to sell sex to the viewers, and dress the group like the members from Jersey Shore. Alex, Zack, and Rian are surrounded by bikini-clad girls, while Jack is awkwardly placed next to two scantily-clad men. The final method used by the executive is stealing people's ideas. He puts costumes on the band from various popular music videos. Some of the music videos that are being targeted include "Bad Romance" by Lady Gaga, "Baby" by Justin Bieber, "Holiday" by Green Day and "California Gurls" by Katy Perry. At the end, All Time Low is left feeling disgusted, and they go home. Some have compared the video to Sum 41's music video for "Still Waiting".

=== Charts ===
Chart (2011)	Peak position
Scotland (OCC)	72
UK Singles (OCC)	85
US Heatseekers Songs (Billboard)	23
US Bubbling Under Hot 100 (Billboard)	13
US Pop Airplay (Billboard)	39

== Release history ==
Release dates and formats for "I Feel Like Dancin'"
Region	Date	Format	Label(s)	Ref.
United States	June 14, 2011	Mainstream airplay	Interscope	
