= Weekend (novel) =

2006 novel by William McIlvanney

First edition (publ. Sceptre)

Weekend is a novel by the Scottish writer William McIlvanney published in 2006.

== Critical reception ==
Writing in the Guardian in 2006, Irvine Welsh describes the book as having the "hunger, verve and freshness of a debut novel", and notes that "one of McIlvanney's greatest gifts as a writer has been the unerring humanity he invests in his characters, even at their most desperate".

Stuart Kelly in the Telegraph highlighted the "terrifically comic moments" and "scenes of utter poignancy in the book" and wrote that "Weekend is Chekhovian in its unspoken moments and hard-won affirmations."

In The Scottish Review of Books it is noted that in "Weekend William McIlvanney offers a masterclass in how to treat our very ancient modern condition: with as much high seriousness and sly wit as it deserves, with compassion for our foolishness and awe at our powers of endurance – simply our getting up every morning to begin again".

Carol Birch in the Independent writes that "A complex, clever book, Weekend showcases McIlvanney's expertise with one-liners. Easy to admire, though curiously uninvolving, it packs a chilly punch".
