= Alice in Videoland =

Swedish electroclash band

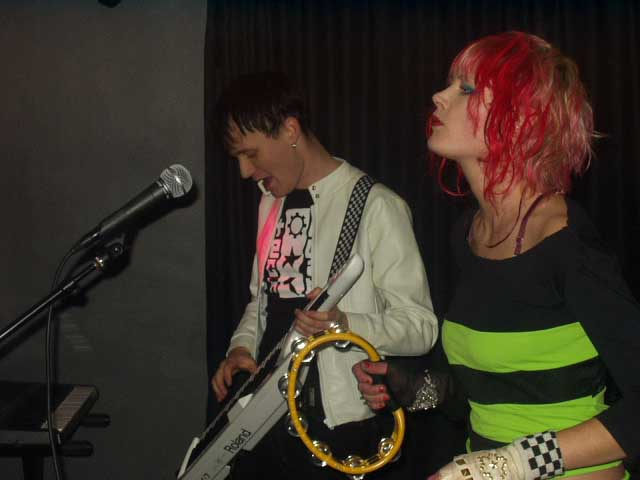
- Alice in Videoland during a concert on Klubb Utopi in Skövde Sweden 2004

Background information
- Origin: Malmö, Sweden
- Genres: Electroclash; Synthpop; Electropunk
- Years active: 2002–2019
- Labels: Diket Records; National; Wonderland Records; Storming the Base
- Members: Toril Lindqvist; Anders Alexander; Johan Dahlbom; Martin Kenzo
- Past members: Carl Lundgren; Anders Lundgren; Dominique

Alice in Videoland was an electroclash band from Sweden. They were compared to bands like Yeah Yeah Yeahs, Missing Persons and The Sounds, although they are more electronic.

== History ==
Alice in Videoland describe themselves as a combination of minimal 80's synth pop music with an upbeat electronic body music (ebm) assault and a bitchy disco punk female singer.

Alice in Videoland was formed in 2002 by singer Toril Lindqvist and former band member Carl Lundgren. The band gained a massive response on their very first demo with the original idea, which they still try to adhere to, of combining edgy synth-basses, ebm and electro with punk rock, and placing the edgy voice and melodies of Toril on top to create a unique style.

After six months of being on the ‘demo market’ the band were signed to the National label and recruited Anders Alexander (drums and synths) and Johan Dahlbom (bass). The recording of their debut album Maiden Voyage (2003) began. At the same time the band took the local club scene by storm with their energetic live shows.

Their second album Outrageous! was released in 2005 and by that time the band had gained an underground worldwide fan base. The single "Cut The Crap" opened up the US market for the band and a contract was signed with US label Storming The Base. Before the release of Outrageous! Carl Lundgren left the band and was replaced by Dominique who later also left the band due to his own projects. The guitarist Martin Kenzo plays now in their place.

More recently Alice in Videoland has returned to release their third album She’s A Machine! in 2008, which the band described as harder and edgier than their previous works.

In 2010 Alice In Videoland released their latest single "Spaceship" which became the band's first radio hit in Sweden and on 2 November the same year, they released their fourth album A Million Thoughts And They´re All About You. The band also made their first video ( "In A Band") in 5 years.

In April 2015, after a nearly four-year hiatus, the band announced that their new single "Let Go" would be released in May, and their would-be fifth album Forever would be released sometime later in 2015. The album never materialized, but a second single, "Stand", was released later that year.

In November 2018, the band announced on their Facebook page that they would be disbanding after playing a few final gigs in 2019, and that they would be releasing a limited edition Best of Alice in Videoland compilation on vinyl featuring two new songs. A new single "Souls on Fire" with b-side "Shocker" was released digitally on 24 December 2018.

After Alice in Videoland disbanded, Toril Lindqvist formed a new electronic band called Le Volt together with Magnus Norr of The Girl & The Robot.

== Line up ==
- Toril Lindqvist – vocals
- Anders Alexander – drums, synth
- Johan Dahlbom – bass
- Martin Kenzo – guitar

== Discography ==
=== Albums ===
- Maiden Voyage (2003)
- Outrageous! (2005)
- She's A Machine! (2008)
- A Million Thoughts and They’re All About You (2010)

=== Singles ===
Year	Details	Album
2003	Dance With Me	Maiden Voyage
2003	The Bomb	Maiden Voyage Plus
2003	Got To Go	Maiden Voyage
2004	Going Down	Maiden Voyage
2005	Bad Boy	Outrageous!
2005	Cut The Crap	Outrageous!
2005	Radiosong	Outrageous!
2008	Numb	She's A Machine!
2008	We Are Rebels	She's A Machine!
2009	Psychobitch	Non-album single
2010	Spaceship	A Million Thoughts and They’re All About You
2011	Something New	A Million Thoughts and They’re All About You
2015	Let Go	Non-album single
2015	Stand	Non-album single
2018	Souls on Fire	Best of Alice in Videoland (Limited edition vinyl)

=== Remixes ===
- Giana Mix of "Black" by Colony 5 on the EP Black
- Nemesis Mix of "Nothing Can Be Saved" by Univaque on the EP Nothing Can Be Saved
- Remix of "Dead Body" by XPQ-21 on the album Alive
- Remix of "Superior Love" by Sara Noxx (featuring Limahl) on the EP Superior Love (The Bright Side)
