= Maja Ivarsson =

Swedish musician

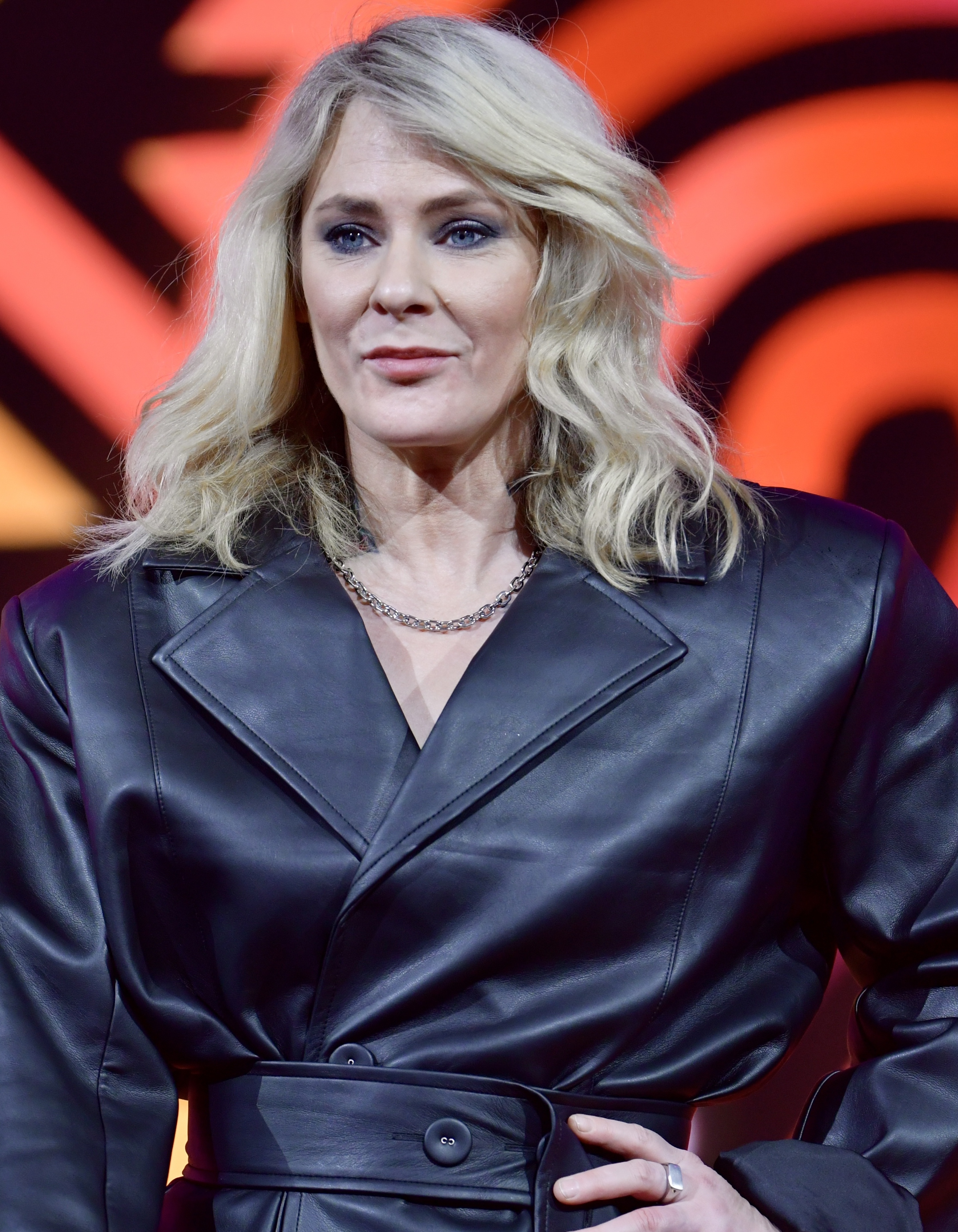
- Maja Ivarsson in January 2025

Background information
- Born: 2 October 1979 (age 46); Åhus, Sweden
- Origin: Helsingborg, Sweden
- Genres: Indie rock
- Instruments: French horn, Vocals, electric guitar
- Years active: 1994–present
- Member of: The Sounds

Maja Ivarsson (Swedish pronunciation: [ˈmâjːa ˈîːvaˌʂɔn]; born 2 October 1979) is a Swedish singer and lead vocalist of the Swedish indie rock band The Sounds.

== Career ==
The Sounds formed in 1998 in Helsingborg, by childhood friends guitarist and vocalist Felix Rodriguez and bassist Johan Bengtsson, who later invited drummer Fredrik Nilsson on board. Maja Ivarsson met the group in high school when the guitarist Felix Rodriguez ended up in the same class. Due to Maja singing at school and her striking appearance Felix then proceeded to invite Maja to join the group under the condition that she would have to sing. Although Maja wasn't keen on singing, she decided to join the band. The last and youngest member to join the band was Jesper Anderberg; the group met him during the Hultsfred Festival by chance and invited him to join.

The Sounds are active on the touring circuit, including the United States. Their first tour was in the wake of their 2003 smash "Living in America" (both the song and the album). They have been to the "Southern Finland triangle" (Turku, Tampere, and Helsinki) many times, but their tour in the fall of 2006 showcased them in additional inland and coastal towns. After that, they went on international tour and were in Portugal in 2007. In 2008, they began a tour of Europe and North America that ended at the end of summer 2009. The band opened for No Doubt alongside Paramore during a U.S. tour over the summer of 2009. These proved to be successful exposure for them as their popularity on myspace, Twitter, and their Street Team increased dramatically. Most of the shows on their tour involved opening for No Doubt, while some of their headlining shows featured opening act Hey Champ. The Sounds headlined a 2009 US tour with supporting acts Semi Precious Weapons and Foxy Shazam and a tour in Europe with supporting act Matt & Kim to promote their album, Crossing the Rubicon.

In 2002, Ivarsson collaborated with Andreas Mattson in the song "Free Free Free" which was released on the soundtrack for the German film Big Girls Don't Cry.

Ivarsson was featured in Cobra Starship's single and music video "Snakes on a Plane (Bring It)", for the 2006 film Snakes on a Plane.

In March 2011, Ivarsson signed a promotion campaign by American hair care company Sebastian Professional. Earlier fashion-related appearances included the Berlin Fashion Week in January 2011, where the Sounds played during the presentation of a German fashion label.

Ivarsson is featured on the song "We Are Rebels" by Alice in Videoland from their 2008 album She's A Machine! and on All Time Low's song "Guts" on their 2011 album Dirty Work. She also collaborated with Felix Cartal on the song "Tonight" from his 2012 album Different Faces and with Andreas Kleerup performing co-vocals on the EP As If We Never Won.

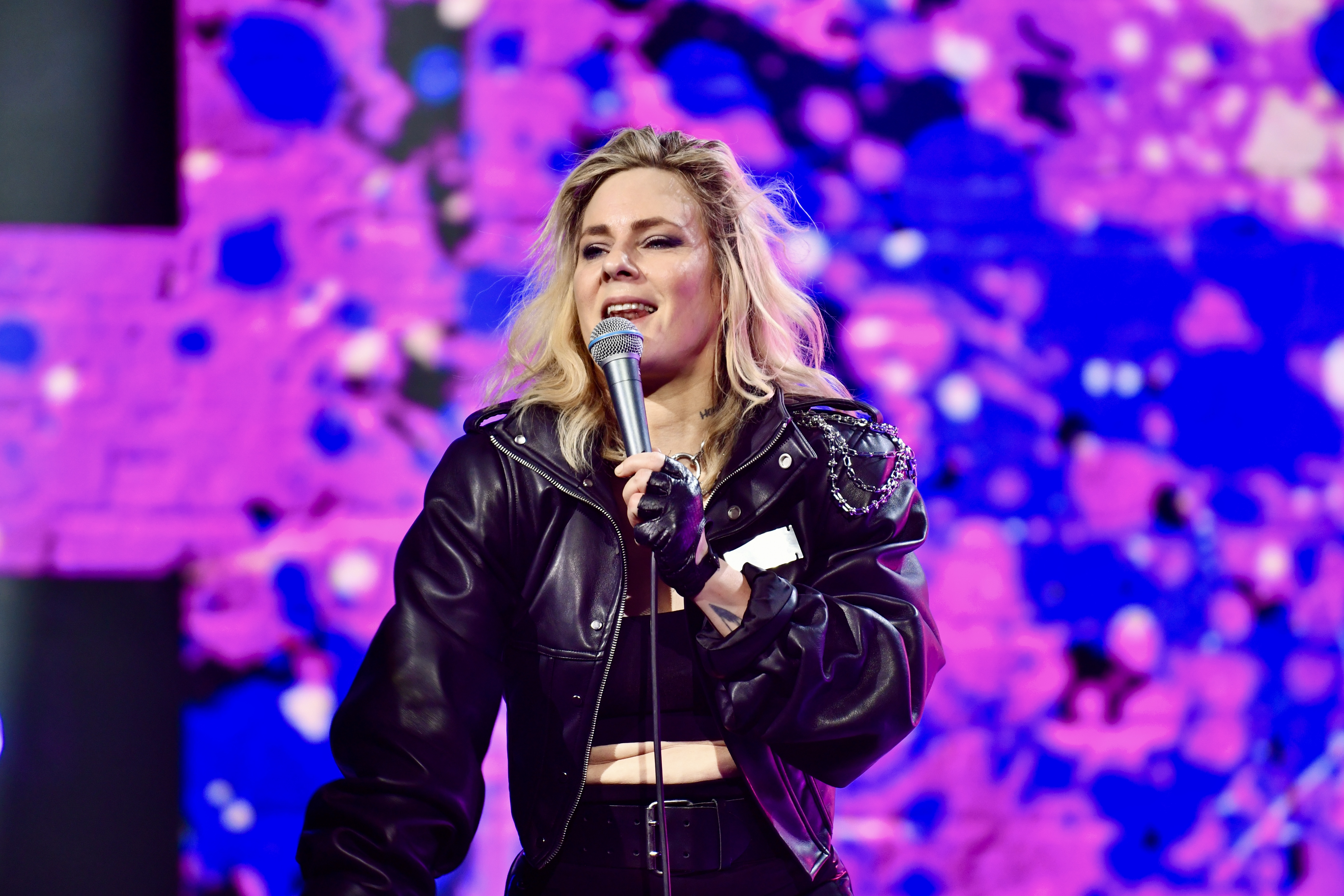
Ivarsson performing "Kamikaze Life" during Melodifestivalen 2025

In February 2025, Ivarsson released the single Kamikaze Life in association with her appearance on Swedish television at the music competition Melodifestivalen 2025, the song was one of two that advanced to the final of the competition. On 8 March 2025, Ivarsson placed 11th in the final of the contest.

== Influences ==
Ivarsson found Roxy Music and their song "Love Is the Drug" a big inspiration; references to this song and Bryan Ferry can be found in the Sounds' single "Rock 'n' Roll". Depeche Mode and Bruce Springsteen were popular when she was young and she found the Depeche Mode song "My Secret Garden" particularly mesmerizing until her brother translated the lyrics for her (she did not yet speak English), at which point she refused to listen to the rest of the translation.

== Personal life ==
Ivarsson began playing the French horn at the age of 8 and at 13 she took up the electric guitar. She is also a composer and lyricist, even though most of the Sounds' songs are written by the other band members. Around the age of 8, she took up karate, Thai boxing and kickboxing.

=== Sexuality ===
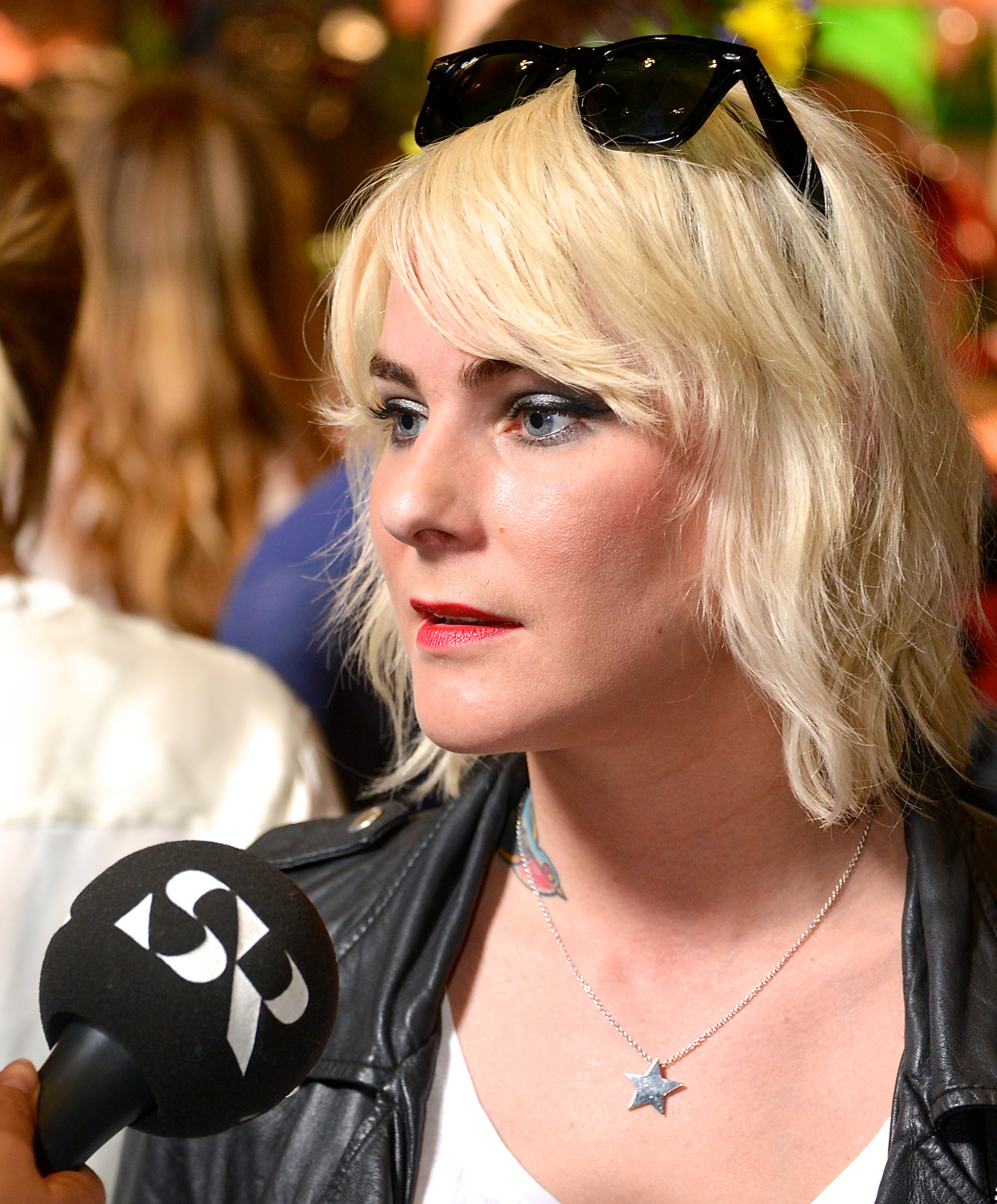
Ivarsson in 2013

When asked by an interviewer in Out Magazine, Ivarsson characterized herself as bisexual. When asked what kind of sexual partners she prefers, she replied, "I like very feminine girls. And very masculine boys. Kind of boring in a way. If I was dating a guy, I like it almost when you can't make up your mind if they're good looking or not. I don't like pretty boys at all." In previous interviews, she confirmed her status as "a member of the queer community." She was in a six-year-long relationship with a woman, but in 2010 they broke up. In the early years of the Sounds, Ivarsson was in a long-term relationship with fellow band member Fredrik Nilsson. In a 2014 interview, Ivarsson stated she was engaged. She gave birth to son Dante on 16 February 2015.

In June 2013, during a Swedish radio show entitled Sommar i P1, Ivarsson revealed that she once had been emotionally and physically abused as well as raped by a former male friend of her family.

== Discography ==
=== Singles ===
- 2012: "Mitt bästa for dig" (from EP Så mycket bättre (Säsong 3 - Pughs dag - Program 1))
- 2012: "Norrländska präriens gudinna" (from EP Så mycket bättre (Säsong 3 - Olles dag - Program 2))
- 2013: "Want Ya!" (from EP Så mycket bättre (Säsong 3 - Darin's dag - Program 7))

=== Charting singles ===
Title	Year	Peak chart positions	Album
Title	Year	SWE	Album
"Kamikaze Life"	2025	11	Kamikaze Life
