= Nothing Personal (All Time Low album) =

Studio album by All Time Low
- Released: July 7, 2009
- Recorded: January–March 2009
- Genre: Emo pop; pop-punk; pop rock
- Length: 41:00
- Label: Hopeless
- Producer: Matt Squire; Butch Walker; S*A*M & Sluggo; David Bendeth

All Time Low chronology
So Wrong, It's Right (2007)	Nothing Personal (2009)	Straight to DVD (2010)

Singles from Nothing Personal
- 1. "Weightless" Released: April 7, 2009; 2. "Damned If I Do Ya (Damned If I Don't)" Released: June 16, 2009; 3. "Lost in Stereo" Released: April 4, 2010

Nothing Personal is the third studio album by American rock band All Time Low. As early as May 2008, the band began writing for their third album, and by November revealed they would be recording in the winter. The band began pre-production in early January 2009 and started recording later in the month, which lasted until March. Half of the album's songs were produced by Matt Squire with Butch Walker, David Bendeth and S*A*M and Sluggo each producing a few songs. Tom Lord-Alge mixed the majority of the album. "Weightless" was made available for streaming in March, and released as a single in April. A support slot for Fall Out Boy and an appearance at the Bamboozle festival followed.

The band went on an Australian tour in June, which was followed by a music video for "Weightless" in July. Nothing Personal was released through Hopeless Records on July 7. On the same day, the band performed shows in three different cities in a 24-hour span. They then went on a US tour before performing on the main stage at the Warped Tour in July and August, followed by appearances at the Reading and Leeds Festivals. In September, a music video was released for "Damned If I Do Ya (Damned If I Don't)", and the track was released as a single. Between October and February 2010, the group went on tours of the US, UK and Australia. "Lost in Stereo" was released as a single in April; a music video followed in late August.

Nothing Personal sold 63,000 copies and reached number four on the Billboard 200, giving the band their biggest first week sales. The album went on to sell over 135,000 copies by September 2009. It reached number one on three Billboard charts: Alternative Albums, Independent Albums and Top Rock Albums. It also charted at various positions in Australia, Canada, Japan, the Netherlands, Sweden and the UK. The album has since been certified Gold by both the British Phonographic Industry (BPI) and Recording Industry Association of America (RIAA). As well, "Weightless" has been certified Gold by the RIAA. They re-recorded the album live in studio as It's Still Nothing Personal - A Ten Year Tribute in 2019.

== Background ==
All Time Low signed with Hopeless Records in March 2006 and released the Put Up or Shut Up EP in July of that year. The band's second album, So Wrong, It's Right, was released in September 2007. They began writing for their third album between tours. In February 2008, it was reported that All Time Low had collaborated on a song with Mark Hoppus of Blink-182 and +44. The band connected with Hoppus after exchanging emails when a video of drummer Rian Dawson getting a Blink-182 tattoo was posted online. Hoppus' management contacted the band saying he wanted to do something with the group, so they co-wrote a song with him. Although the song would not feature on the group's next album, as Gaskarth explains, "It just didn't fit the vibe of the record," he said it would "definitely come out at some time".

In May, vocalist/guitarist Alex Gaskarth revealed that the band had been working on new material and were planning to take a break to write new songs, despite the first single from So Wrong, It's Right, "Dear Maria, Count Me In", having been released only two weeks before. In August, the band said they were going to record their next album in the winter. In October and November, the group went on the Compromising of Integrity, Morality, & Principles in Exchange for Money tour in the US. While on the Milwaukee date of the tour, Gaskarth mentioned that the band would record their next album following the tour's conclusion. In December, Alternative Press reported that Matt Squire, Butch Walker, and David Bendeth would produce the band's next album, which was projected to be released in 2009.

== Production ==
Although still in the writing process, it was reported on January 7, 2009, that All Time Low had begun recording their next album. It was clarified on January 24 that the band was in pre-production, proper recording did not start until the following day. It was also reported that Matt Squire would produce five songs for the album. Squire ended up producing "Weightless", "Break Your Little Heart", "Stella", "Too Much", "Keep the Change, You Filthy Animal" and "A Party Song (The Walk of Shame)". at Red Bull Studios in Los Angeles, with recording being handled by Bill Appleberry. On February 9, the band recorded group vocals assisted by Runner Runner. On February 17, videos were posted showing the band recording with Walker, who produced "Damned If I Do Ya (Damned If I Don't)" and "Sick Little Games". Later that day, AbsolutePunk reported that the band was in New Jersey recording with Bendeth, who produced "Walls", "Therapy" and "Poison".S*A*M and Sluggo produced "Lost in Stereo" and "Hello, Brooklyn". Gaskarth said that they "kinda split up the [recording] with different producers that we wanted to work with in the past, but for scheduling or monetary reasons, we couldn't lock them in for the whole record".

On March 16, it was disclosed that the band had finished recording. On March 24, the album was in the process of being mixed. Tom Lord-Alge mixed "Weightless", "Break Your Little Heart", "Damned If I Do Ya (Damned If I Don't)", "Lost in Stereo", "Stella", "Sick Little Games", "Hello, Brooklyn", "Keep the Change, You Filthy Animal" and "A Party Song (The Walk of Shame)", with the assistance of Femio Hernandez. Bendeth mixed "Walls", "Therapy" and "Poison". Brian Malouf mixed "Too Much". Alex Suarez of Cobra Starship remixed "Weightless". All of the recordings were mastered by Ted Jensen at Sterling Sound, except Suarez's remix of "Weightless", which was mastered by Vlado Meller at Universal Mastering Studios in New York.

== Composition ==
Musically, the sound of Nothing Personal has been described as emo pop, pop-punk, and pop rock. With the album, Gaskarth said he wrote the foundation of the songs, typically the "bare-bones" chords and melodies, before showing the rest of the band. He clarified that they usually write together as a full band, "so, most times, musically, it involves contributions from everybody". "Weightless", "Break Your Little Heart", "Stella", "Keep the Change, You Filthy Animal" and "A Party Song (The Walk of Shame)" were written by the band and Squire. "Damned If I Do Ya (Damned If I Don't)" and "Sick Little Games" were written by the band and Walker. "Lost in Stereo" and "Hello, Brooklyn" were written by the band, Sam Hollander and Dave Katz. "Walls", "Therapy" and "Poison" were written by the band and David Bendeth. "Too Much" was written by the band, Terius Nash and Christopher Stewart.

Explaining why the producers were given co-writing credit, Gaskarth said "...the way in which this album was written involved me working, in some way, on all of the songs in their respective presence, while taking their professional advice. It was only fair to give credit where credit was due." Talking about the album, Gaskarth explained to Alternative Press, "we tried to explore something a little bit deeper. We're exploring some new moods, which is pretty cool." He added, "It's nice to get away from the pop-punk niche we came up in ... it's nice to try to broaden your horizons. To be honest, we wrote a lot of this album with that in mind." Gaskarth called his lyrics "very tongue in cheek," which "fit the vibe" of the album. Gaskarth said "Damned If I Do Ya (Damned If I Don't)" had a "light-hearted, fun vibe, without being a throwaway, joke song".

The opening song "Weightless" beings with a drum machine and muted playing, with the music pausing for a second, before the guitars come in. The New Found Glory-indebted "Break Your Little Heart" is followed by the pop rock song "Damned If I Do Ya (Damned If I Don't)", which features arena rock guitarwork. "Lost in Stereo" discusses unrequited love; the chorus evokes Jimmy Eat World. The mid-tempo pop rock track "Stella" talks about being drunk on the beverage Stella Artois, and is followed by the ballad "Sick Little Games". "Too Much" is a slow-tempo electronic song, with Gaskarth's vocals channelling Motion City Soundtrack's Justin Pierre, and being altered by a vocoder and auto-tune. "Keep the Change, You Filthy Animal" details sabotaging a relationship, and is followed by "A Party Song (The Walk of Shame)", which talks about one night stands. "Therapy" recalled the works of Motion City Soundtrack and the Plain White T's.

== Release ==
"Weightless" was made available for streaming on March 24, 2009, via AbsolutePunk, receiving around 50,000 plays in 24 hours. It was released as a single on April 7. On April 17, it was announced that Nothing Personal would be released in early July. In April and May, the band supported Fall Out Boy on the Believers Never Die Tour Part Deux in the US, and appeared at The Bamboozle festival. In between dates on the tour, the band performed two headlining shows. On May 15, the album's track listing was made known. On May 26, the album's artwork, which was created by Mark Capicotto, was revealed. In late May, the band went on a brief tour of Japan with Set Your Goals. Following this, the band toured Australia as part of the Take Action Tour in early June. "Damned If I Do Ya (Damned If I Don't)" was posted on the band's MySpace page on June 15 and was released digitally on June 16. On June 30, the album was made available for streaming through MTV's The Leak. A music video for "Weightless" debuted on MTV on July 5, featuring cameo appearances by Hoppus and Pete Wentz of Fall Out Boy. It was directed by Matthew Stawski.

Nothing Personal was released through Hopeless Records on July 7. Pre-orders on iTunes came with "Poison" and a remix of "Lost of Stereo" as bonus tracks. Boomtown Records released the album was released in Australia on July 20. The UK release, which did not occur until 14 September, included bonus tracks. Also on July 7, the band performed three Myspace secret shows in Washington D.C., Chicago, Illinois, and Orange County, California in a 24-hour span. An alternative version of the "Weightless" video, shot live on the road, was released on July 9. A day later, "Damned If I Do Ya (Damned If I Don't)" was sent to Mainstream Top 40 radio stations. In July, the band went on a headlining US east coast with support from We the Kings, Cartel, and Days Difference. The band then performed on the main stage of the Warped Tour throughout July and August. "Weightless" was released in the UK on August 3. In late August, the band appeared at the Reading and Leeds Festivals in the UK. The band then performed at various Six Flags locations as part of the mtvU VMA Tour.

In September and October, the band went on a European tour with support from the Audition. A music video was released for "Damned If I Do Ya (Damned If I Don't)" on September 16, directed by Stawski. On September 22, "Damned If I Do Ya (Damned If I Don't)" was released as a single featuring the music video and a remix of the track by Patrick Stump of Fall Out Boy. Between mid-October and early December, the band went on a headlining US tour alongside We the Kings, Hey Monday and the Friday Night Boys. In January and February 2010, the band went on the Kerrang! tour, with support from the Blackout, My Passion and Young Guns. As part of the tour, the band did two in-store performances in Glasgow and Manchester. In February and March, the band performed at Soundwave festival in Australia. "Lost in Stereo" was released as a single on April 12, and included a Blueskies remix of "Damned If I Do Ya (Damned If I Don't)". In May and June, the band co-headlined the Bamboozle Roadshow 2010 tour in the US, alongside Boys Like Girls, LMFAO and Third Eye Blind. On August 31, a music video was released for "Lost in Stereo".

== Critical reception ==
Professional ratings
Review scores
Source	Rating
AbsolutePunk	73%
AllMusic	3.5/5 stars
Alternative Press	3.5/5 stars
Consequence of Sound	F
Kerrang!	KKKK
Melodic	3.5/5 stars
Rock Sound	8/10
ShockHound	5/5 stars
Sputnikmusic	3/5
The Washington Post	mixed

Nothing Personal was met with mixed-to-positive reviews. AbsolutePunk reviewer Drew Beringer praised the album for its "massive hooks" and complimented the "nature of the lyrics". He also noted a few flaws on the album, saying "Hello, Brooklyn" is an "awful song" and "Too Much" is everything that its title implies. He closed by saying, "the rest of 2009 is shaping up to be All Time Low's year". Alternative Press, commenting on the album's first single, said "'Weightless' is an insta-classic." However, the reviewer was disappointed in the producers for their use of Auto-Tune, saying "This boy (Gaskarth) can sing, let him already." The article also contradicted AbsolutePunk's view of the song "Too Much", saying it "is a remarkable progression for the quartet: a slow, electronic-tinged number". The Washington Post was also hugely favorable of the album. Reviewer Nancy Dunham said: "The songs on Nothing Personal are what pop-punk is all about -- or should be, anyway." She felt the album "will likely gain the band plenty of media and popular attention" and that "the album's 12 tunes are so jaunty and their lyrics about first love, betrayal and parties so angst-filled you can easily imagine them playing in the background of the TV shows The Hills or 90210".

Tim Sendra of AllMusic he stated "All Time Low shows signs of maturing," he summarized by adding, "Nothing Personal is an example of emo-pop at its best, and anyone who thinks emo is just a bunch of pop junk might be surprised at how catchy and powerful a modern rock album it is." Kerrang! writer Nick Ruskell praised lead single, "Weightless", as "a three minute rush of punk smothered in pop fairy dust". He went on to add that, "Nothing Personal is simply a good, fun record." Rock Sound stated the band had "nailed it with their third offering". The review went on to say, "Lead single 'Weightless' kicks things off in cracking fashion with its epic sing-along chorus, and the momentum continues well into the rest of the album. Matt Squire (Panic! at the Disco) returns with his trademark production polish". Courtney Lear of online music site ShockHound, also praised the album, commenting that it had "massive hooks and memorable choruses, with frontman Alex Gaskarth singing songs about cross-country partying, drinking too much, and hooking up. Who needs classy guys? Rebel against your parents, girls."

== Commercial performance and legacy ==
Prior to the album's release, Billboard magazine predicted that Nothing Personal could enter the top ten of the Billboard 200 in its debut week, with projected sales of 60,000–75,000 copies. As it happened, Nothing Personal debuted at number four and sold 63,000 copies, becoming the group's best sales week and highest-charting album, until Future Hearts surpassed it in 2015 by reaching number two. By September 2009, the album had sold over 135,000 copies. Nothing Personal also charted on a number of Billboard charts: number one on the Alternative Albums, Independent Albums and Top Rock Albums charts, and number three on the Digital Albums chart. At the end of the year, the album had charted at number 38 on the Alternative Albums (Year End) chart, and number 50 on the Top Rock Albums (Year End) chart. In addition, the album reached number 22 in both Canada and Sweden, number 69 in Japan, number 71 in Australia, number 86 in the Netherlands and number 104 in the UK. "Weightless" charted at number 75 on the Digital Song Sales chart and number 100 in the UK. "Damned If I Do Ya (Damned If I Don't)" charted at number 67 on the Billboard Hot 100, becoming the band's first song to do so. It also charted at number 40 on both the Digital Song Sales and Heatseekers Songs charts. "Lost in Stereo" charted at number 126 in the UK.

In 2010, Gaskarth called the album "great", however, he felt they "went a bit too far in one direction. I think we went too pop for our band." Barakat added that "we were kind of afraid to be pop or afraid to be rock, so the songs ended up in a weird medium". Nothing Personal was certified Silver and then Gold by the British Phonographic Industry (BPI) in December 2012 and March 2017. The Recording Industry Association of America (RIAA) certified "Weightless" Gold in November 2014, and the album Gold in May 2017. Alternative Press included "Walls" and "Too Much" on their list of the band's best non-single songs. Rock Sound said that the album was a big influence on Tonight Alive's What Are You So Scared Of? (2011), Fall Out Boy's Save Rock and Roll (2013), Neck Deep's Wishful Thinking (2014), 5 Seconds of Summer's 5 Seconds of Summer (2014) and As It Is' Never Happy, Ever After (2015).

For the album's 10th anniversary, All Time Low announced on July 8, 2019, one day after the 10th anniversary of its release date, that they would rerecord it in a pseudo-live setting at RedBull Studios for release later in the year. It was released in digital format as It's Still Nothing Personal: A Ten Year Tribute on November 8, 2019, through Fueled by Ramen Records.

== Track listing ==
Writing credits per BMI and ASCAP.

Standard Edition
No.	Title	Writer(s)	Producer(s)	Length
1.	"Weightless"	Jack Barakat; Rian Dawson; Alex Gaskarth; Zack Merrick; Matt Squire	Matt Squire	3:18
2.	"Break Your Little Heart"	Barakat; Dawson; Gaskarth; Merrick; Squire	Squire	2:51
3.	"Damned If I Do Ya (Damned If I Don't)"	Barakat; Dawson; Gaskarth; Merrick; Butch Walker	Butch Walker	3:07
4.	"Lost in Stereo"	Barakat; Dawson; Gaskarth; Sam Hollander; Dave Katz; Merrick	S*A*M and Sluggo	3:47
5.	"Stella"	Barakat; Dawson; Gaskarth; Merrick; Squire	Squire	3:24
6.	"Sick Little Games"	Barakat; Dawson; Gaskarth; Merrick; Walker	Walker	3:36
7.	"Hello, Brooklyn"	Barakat; Dawson; Gaskarth; Hollander; Katz; Merrick	S*A*M and Sluggo	3:29
8.	"Walls"	Barakat; David Bendeth; Dawson; Gaskarth; Merrick	David Bendeth	3:11
9.	"Too Much"	Barakat; Dawson; Gaskarth; Merrick; Terius Nash; Christopher Stewart	Squire	4:14
10.	"Keep the Change, You Filthy Animal"	Barakat; Dawson; Gaskarth; Merrick; Squire	Squire	3:20
11.	"A Party Song (The Walk of Shame)"	Barakat; Dawson; Gaskarth; Merrick; Squire	Squire	2:59
12.	"Therapy"	Barakat; Bendeth; Dawson; Gaskarth; Merrick	Bendeth	3:44
Total length:				41:04

UK Bonus Tracks
No.	Title	Writer(s)	Producer(s)	Length
13.	"Poison"	Barakat; Bendeth; Dawson; Gaskarth; Merrick	Bendeth	3:19
14.	"Weightless" (The Secret Handshake remix)			3:09
15.	"Lost in Stereo" (Cobra Starship Suave Suarez remix)			3:57
16.	"Dear Maria, Count Me In" (Connect Sets acoustic)			3:26
17.	"Coffee Shop Soundtrack" (acoustic remix)			3:58
Total length:				58:53

== Personnel ==
Personnel per booklet.

All Time Low

- Alex Gaskarth – lead vocals, rhythm guitar
- Jack Barakat – lead guitar, backing vocals
- Zack Merrick – bass guitar, backing vocals
- Rian Dawson – drums

Production

- Matt Squire – producer (tracks 1, 2, 5 and 9–11)
- Bill Appleberry – recording (tracks 1, 2, 5, 10 and 11)
- Butch Walker – producer (tracks 3 and 6)
- S*A*M and Sluggo – producer (tracks 4 and 7)
- David Bendeth – producer (tracks 8, 12 and 13), mixing (tracks 8, 12 and 13)
- Chris Lord-Alge – mixing (track 3)
- Tom Lord-Alge – mixing (tracks 1,2, 4–7, 10 and 11)
- Femio Hernandez – assistant
- Brian Malouf – mixing (track 9)
- Alex Suarez – remixing (track 14)
- Ted Jensen – mastering (tracks 1–13)
- Vlado Meller – mastering (track 14)
- Mark Capicotto – artwork, layout

== Charts and certifications ==
=== Weekly charts ===
Chart (2009)	Peak position
Australian Albums (ARIA)	71
Canadian Albums (Billboard)	22
Dutch Albums (Single Top 100)	86
Japanese Albums (Oricon)	69
Swedish Albums (Sverigetopplistan)	22
UK Albums (OCC)	104
US Billboard 200	4
US Alternative Albums	1
US Digital Albums	3
US Independent Albums	1
US Top Rock Albums	1

=== Year-end charts ===
Chart (2009)	Peak position
US Alternative Albums	38
US Top Rock Albums	50

=== Certifications ===
Region	Certification	Certified units/sales
United Kingdom (BPI)	Gold	101,649
United States (RIAA)	Gold	500,000^{‡}
^{‡} Sales+streaming figures based on certification alone.
