= Living in America (The Sounds song) =

"Living In America"

Single by The Sounds

from the album Living in America
- Released: 2002
- Recorded: 2002
- Length: 3:29 (album version); 3:27 (radio edit); 3:25 (video version)
- Label: Telegram Records Stockholm
- Songwriter: The Sounds

The Sounds singles chronology
"Seven Days a Week" (2002)	"Living In America" (2002)	"Hit Me!" (2002)

"Living in America" is the second single by Swedish band The Sounds from their debut album Living in America. The song reached number 3 on the Swedish single charts and was the band's first single released in the United States.

== Usage in media ==
The song is featured in the 2010 video game Rock Band 3 and was the theme song to the television series Welcome to Sweden.

== Track listing ==
- CD 0927-48443-5
1. "Living in America" (3:28)
2. "The S.O.U.N.D.S" (in-house version) (3:39)

== Charts ==
=== Weekly charts ===
Chart (2002–2004)	Peak position
Sweden (Sverigetopplistan)	3

=== Year-end charts ===
Chart (2002)	Position
Sweden (Sverigetopplistan)	24
Chart (2003)	Position
Sweden (Sverigetopplistan)	31
