= Damned If I Do Ya (Damned If I Don't) =

Single by All Time Low

from the album Nothing Personal
- Released: June 16, 2009
- Recorded: 2009
- Genre: Pop punk
- Length: 3:11
- Label: Hopeless
- Songwriters: Jack Barakat; Rian Dawson; Alex Gaskarth; Zack Merrick; Butch Walker

All Time Low singles chronology
"Weightless" (2009)	"Damned If I Do Ya (Damned If I Don't)" (2009)	"Lost in Stereo" (2010)

Music video
- "Damned If I Do Ya (Damned If I Don't)" on YouTube

"Damned If I Do Ya (Damned If I Don't)" is a song by American rock band All Time Low and is the second single taken from their third studio album, Nothing Personal (2009). It was released by Hopeless Records as a digital download on June 16, 2009. It became All Time Low's first US Billboard Hot 100 charting song, debuting and peaking at No. 67, and was their only song to chart until "Monsters" in early 2021.

== Lyrical meaning ==
In an exclusive acoustic session with Real Magic TV, Alex Gaskarth (lead vocalist of All Time Low) explained the meaning of this song by stating, "It's a fun little tune about, uh, about charades that one may have with another individual. I'll leave the rest up to you."

== Track listing ==
1. "Damned If I Do Ya (Damned If I Don't)" – 3:11

== Music video ==
In the first week of July, three videos for the making of "Damned If I Do Ya (Damned If I Don't)" were posted on Buzznet. It shows lead singer Alex Gaskarth in a school bench with a teacher walking around him. It was shot with a green screen, which Rian Dawson (drummer for All Time Low) explained would mean that the editors would create the background during the production process.

The video was directed and animated by Matthew Stawski, who also directed All Time Low's video for "Weightless" and Fall Out Boy's "America's Suitehearts" video. The artwork for the video was done by Joshua Clay, who also did the artwork for Fall Out Boy's "America's Suitehearts" along with Serge Gay, Jr.

Some behind the scenes photos were posted on a Glamour Kills blog on September 8, 2009, stating that the music video will premiere the following week.

The video itself premiered on September 11, 2009.

The video mainly revolves around lead singer Alex Gaskarth. It is set on a talk show called "Damned If I Do Ya, Damned If I Don't". The video opens with Alex and the host, Nika "Nothing Personal" Jones, as she talks about Alex's affair with his school teacher. The video displays distractions Alex has with his classes and at his band practices due to this affair. At the end of the bridge of the song, after Alex sings "but I never promised you", the song comes to a halt. Jack, Zack, Rian, Alex's parents, and the school teacher come out, and a full out brawl is started. The chorus of the song comes back in as everyone is beating each other up. As the song continues, the fight continues as well, and eventually Alex defeats everyone. He and the school teacher kiss and the video ends with the audience clapping.

== Charts ==
Chart (2009)	Peak position
UK Indie (Official Charts)	28
US Billboard Hot 100	67

== Certifications ==
Region	Certification	Certified units/sales
United States (RIAA)	Gold	500,000^{‡}
^{‡} Sales+streaming figures based on certification alone.

== Release history ==
Release dates and formats for "Damned If I Do Ya (Damned If I Don't)"
Region	Date	Format	Label(s)	Ref.
United States	August 18, 2009	Mainstream airplay	Hopeless	
