= Crossing the Rubicon (The Sounds album) =

Studio album by the Sounds
- Released: 2 June 2009
- Recorded: 2009
- Studios: Stratosphere Sound, New York City; Arnioki, Malmö, Sweden; Werewolf Heart, Hollywood, California; Annetenna, Burbank, California; Beat360, New York
- Genres: New wave, post-punk revival
- Length: 52:06
- Labels: Arnioki Records, Original Signal (U.S.)
- Producers: The Sounds, Adam Schlesinger, James Iha, Matt Mahaffey, Jeff Turzo, Tim Anderson, Mark Saunders, Daniel Johannson

The Sounds chronology
Live EP (2006)	Crossing the Rubicon (2009)	Something to Die For (2011)

Alternative cover
- Vinyl Edition Cover.

Singles from Crossing The Rubicon
- 1. "No One Sleeps When I'm Awake" Released: 17 April 2009; 2. "Beatbox" Released: 12 January 2010

Crossing the Rubicon is the third studio album by the Swedish new wave band the Sounds, released on 2 June 2009. On 17 April 2009, the first single "No One Sleeps When I'm Awake" was released on iTunes worldwide. The album was available to Spotify Premium customers from 29 May, and it was officially released 2 June. The second single, "Beatbox" was released on 12 January 2010 on iTunes exclusively. The track "Home Is Where Your Heart Is" is featured on the second part of the 5th season of the MTV reality show The Hills. "No One Sleeps When I'm Awake" is featured on episode eight, season one of The Vampire Diaries. "No One Sleeps When I'm Awake" was given a notable cover version by Miss Li.

== Background ==
For their third album, the band dropped all their producers and founded their own label, Arnioki Records, and used their own money to record Crossing the Rubicon. The band supported the album with a world tour.

== Reception ==
Professional ratings
Aggregate scores
Source	Rating
Metacritic	(57/100)
Review scores
Source	Rating
AllMusic	4/5 stars
Pitchfork	3.7/10.0
PopMatters	4/10 stars
Rolling Stone	2/5 stars
Sonic Seducer	favourable
Spin	3/5 stars
URB	4/5 stars

The album received mixed professional reviews. AllMusic delivered a very positive rating and wrote that it was "the sound of a band reaching their potential as artists" and found that only few songs like "Beatbox" would not reach up to the band's standard. Pitchfork in turn compared "Beatbox" to the music of Blondie but was reluctant to praise the entire album, writing that there had been no evolution in the music of The Sounds. These two features were also noted by the German Sonic Seducer magazine although their author marked a melancholy in tracks like "Crossing The Rubicon" and "Midnight Sun" that was allegedly new for The Sounds. A review by PopMatters concluded that The Killers had been delivering the same style of music before, so Crossing the Rubicon was nothing new. The band's image of "themselves as swaggering, pioneering visionaries" meant employing a backwards perspective instead of looking forward. The Spin magazine's reviewer praised the tracks "4 Songs & a Fight" and "No One Sleeps When I'm Awake", but found the album generally too monotonous.

== Track listing ==
All songs written and composed by The Sounds.

No.	Title	Length
1.	"No One Sleeps When I'm Awake"	4:22
2.	"4 Songs & a Fight"	3:24
3.	"My Lover"	4:25
4.	"Dorchester Hotel"	4:08
5.	"Beatbox"	4:02
6.	"Underground"	3:47
7.	"Crossing the Rubicon"	2:03
8.	"Midnight Sun"	4:30
9.	"Lost in Love"	5:05
10.	"The Only Ones"	4:44
11.	"Home Is Where Your Heart Is"	5:11
12.	"Goodnight Freddy" (Hidden Track)	6:35

iTunes Bonus Track
No.	Title	Length
13.	"No One Sleeps When I'm Awake" (Arnioki Sessions)	4:32

Notes

- "Goodnight Freddy" begins with 2 minutes and 31 seconds of silence

All music and lyrics by Jesper Anderberg and Félix Rodríguez except:
Track 1: Lyrics by J. Anderberg, F. Rodríguez, F. Nilsson, M. Ivarsson
Track 6: Lyrics by J. Anderberg, F. Rodríguez, M. Ivarsson
Track 7: Music by J. Anderberg, F. Rodríguez, F. Nilsson; Lyrics by F. Nilsson
Track 9: Music by J. Anderberg, F. Rodríguez, F. Nilsson; Lyrics by J. Anderberg, F. Rodríguez, F. Nilsson, M. Ivarsson, J. Bengtsson
Track 11: Lyrics by J. Anderberg, F. Rodríguez, F. Nilsson
Tracks 1 & 8: Additional writing by A. Schlesinger & J. Iha

== Charts ==
Chart (2009)	Peak position
Finnish Albums (Suomen virallinen lista)	4
Swedish Albums (Sverigetopplistan)	14
US Billboard 200	64
US Independent Albums (Billboard)	9
US Top Rock Albums (Billboard)	25
US Top Alternative Albums (Billboard)	20

== Personnel ==
- Maja Ivarsson – vocals
- Félix Rodríguez – guitar, backing vocals
- Johan Bengtsson – bass guitar
- Jesper Anderberg – keyboards, piano, guitar, synthesizers, backing vocals
- Fredrik Nilsson – drums, percussion
- Tim Palmer - Mixing
