= Weekend (The Sounds album) =

Studio album by the Sounds
- Released: 29 October 2013
- Genres: New wave, post-punk revival, indie rock, synth-pop
- Length: 41:16
- Labels: Arnioki Records; INgrooves
- Producer: Alex Newport

The Sounds chronology
Something to Die For (2011)	Weekend (2013)	Things We Do for Love (2020)

Singles from Weekend
- 1. "Shake Shake Shake"; 2. "Outlaw"

Professional ratings
Review scores
Source	Rating
AllMusic	3/5 stars
Soundsphere	3/5 stars

Weekend is the fifth studio album by the Swedish new wave band the Sounds.

== Background ==
On March 11, 2013, the band announced they were working on Weekend.

== Track listing ==
All tracks written by Jesper Anderberg, Johan Bengtsson, Maja Ivarsson, Fredrik Nilsson and Felix Rodriguez.

No.	Title	Length
1.	"Shake Shake Shake"	3:31
2.	"Take It the Wrong Way"	4:00
3.	"Hurt the Ones I Love"	3:52
4.	"Weekend"	3:48
5.	"Great Day"	4:45
6.	"Outlaw"	3:03
7.	"Too Young to Die"	3:52
8.	"Panic"	3:14
9.	"Animal"	3:46
10.	"Emperor"	3:52
11.	"Young and Wild"	3:33
Total length:		41.16

== Charts ==
Chart performance for Weekend
Chart (2013)	Peak position
Finnish Albums (Suomen virallinen lista)	42
Swedish Albums (Sverigetopplistan)	35
