= Dear Maria, Count Me In =

Single by All Time Low

from the album So Wrong, It's Right
- Released: May 6, 2008
- Recorded: 2007
- Studio: SOMD Studios, Beltsville, Maryland
- Genre: Pop-punk; emo
- Length: 3:02
- Label: Hopeless
- Songwriters: Jack Barakat; Rian Dawson; Alex Gaskarth; Zack Merrick
- Producers: Matt Squire; Paul Leavitt

All Time Low singles chronology
"Dear Maria, Count Me In" (2008)	"Poppin' Champagne" (2008)

Music video
- "Dear Maria, Count Me In" on YouTube

"Dear Maria, Count Me In" is a song by the American rock band All Time Low. The song is from their second studio album So Wrong, It's Right. It was released May 6, 2008, through Hopeless Records as the album's second single. The song became the band's first to chart on a Billboard chart, reaching No. 86 on the Pop 100, and had a music video that aired frequently on MTV. The commercial success of the song contributed to All Time Low's greater success with their follow-up album Nothing Personal in 2009. In 2011, the song was certified gold by the RIAA for reaching 500,000 sales, and later platinum in 2015 for reaching 1,000,000 units consumed.

== Music video ==
A music video for "Dear Maria, Count Me In" was released on February 14, 2008. The video was directed by Travis Kopach and features the band at a strip club watching a stripper, portrayed by Gilli Messer, with the members' alter egos, portrayed by the band themselves, on the other side of the club. Over the course of the video, the actions of the alter egos become more nonsensical, like riding a motorcycle on stage and letting a chimpanzee dance on the pole. The video reaches a climax when the band members and the alter egos begin to fight, resulting in the alter egos being arrested.

== Legacy ==
Since its release, it has been considered a pop-punk classic.

The song was featured in the first episode of the TV show Stoked, chosen by show-creators Tom McGillis and Jennifer Pertsch.

In January 2021, the song went viral on TikTok, also appearing on Spotify's "Viral Hits" playlist. The song first gained major traction on the app when a user posted a video of himself listening to the song in the car and declaring: "Mom, it was never a phase, it's a lifestyle!". This started the viral "it's not a phase" trend, which saw users quote the line while listening to "Dear Maria, Count Me In" to emphasize their continued appreciation for the pop punk and emo pop of the 2000s. The song gained further notice when users began to argue that it sounded similar to the songs often used in the title sequences of popular anime.

This song also appeared in Guitar Hero 5 and Rock Band 4 as downloadable content.

Superman director James Gunn has stated that it is one of Superman's favorite songs.

== Track listings ==
Digital download

1. "Dear Maria, Count Me In" — 3:02

UK digital single

1. "Dear Maria, Count Me In" — 3:02
2. "Dear Maria, Count Me In" (Connect Sets acoustic) — 3:28

Live single

1. "Dear Maria, Count Me In" (live) — 6:46
2. "Dear Maria, Count Me In" (live) [video] — 5:29

== Charts and certifications ==
=== Weekly charts ===
Chart (2008)	Peak position
US Billboard Pop 100	86
Chart (2021)	Peak position
UK Rock & Metal Singles Chart	3

=== Certifications ===
Region	Certification	Certified units/sales
United Kingdom (BPI)	Platinum	600,000^{‡}
United States (RIAA)	4× Platinum	4,000,000^{‡}
^{‡} Sales+streaming figures based on certification alone.

== Release history ==
Country	Date	Format	Label	Ref.
United States	May 6, 2008	Modern rock radio	Hopeless Records	
United Kingdom	May 12, 2008	Digital download	Hopeless Records	
North America	April 23, 2010	Digital download (live version)	Hopeless Records	
