= National Records =

Defunct American record label

National Records was a record label that was started in New York City by Albert Green in 1945 and lasted until early 1951.

Big Joe Turner was signed at the beginning and remained until 1947. Billy Eckstine was also a big seller for the label as were The Ravens. Eileen Barton had a hit with "If I Knew You Were Comin' I'd've Baked a Cake", which was No. 1 for 10 weeks. Working as A&R men were Lee Magid, Bob Shad, Jesse Stone and Herb Abramson. Abramson went to Jubilee and then co-founded Atlantic with Ahmet Ertegun. From the beginning Dick Thomas was their foremost country and western artist, best remembered for his "Sioux City Sue" (1945). In 1953, National began distribution arrangements with Jubilee Records. National's masters were owned by Savoy, which later reissued many of them.

== See also ==
- List of record labels
