= Living in America (album) =

Studio album by The Sounds
- Released: 11 November 2002
- Genre: New wave, post-punk revival
- Length: 44:28 (US); 41:21 (Original)
- Label: Telegram (Sweden); New Line (US)

The Sounds chronology
Living in America (2002)	Dying to Say This to You (2006)

Alternative cover

Singles from Living In America
- 1. "Fire"/"Hit Me!"; 2. "Living in America"; 3. "Seven Days a Week"; 4. "Dance with Me"; 5. "Rock & Roll" Released: 18 July 2005

Professional ratings
Review scores
Source	Rating
AllMusic	3/5 stars
Drowned in Sound	5/10
Laut.de	3/5 stars
Pitchfork Media	5.9/10

Living in America is the debut album in English by Swedish new wave band The Sounds, produced in 2002 under the Warner Sweden record label. The International Federation of the Phonographic Industry awarded the album a platinum certification in 2003, denoting sales in excess of 40,000 copies.

The album received mixed to positive reviews, AllMusic writer Andy Kellman gave it 3/5 stars and wrote that although the members "embrace the decades-old bands that have inspired them to an unhealthy, cover band-like extent [...] the thing you cannot take away from the members of this Swedish group is that they know how to write and play songs". The album spawned five singles; the second single, "Living in America", reached number three on the Swedish Singles Chart.

== Track listing ==
=== Original Swedish version ===
No.	Title	Length
1.	"Dance with Me"	3:16
2.	"Living in America"	3:28
3.	"Mine For Life"	4:42
4.	"Reggie"	3:20
5.	"Like a Lady"	3:31
6.	"Hit Me!"	2:19
7.	"Rock & Roll"	3:55
8.	"Fire"	3:17
9.	"Hope You're Happy Now"	4:06
10.	"Seven Days a Week"	3:03
11.	"Riot"	2:58
Total length:		37:55

=== American version ===
The American version was released on 6 May 2003. It featured a different song order, alternate artwork and the hidden bonus track "S.O.U.N.D.S".

No.	Title	Length
1.	"Seven Days a Week"	3:01
2.	"Dance with Me"	3:14
3.	"Living in America"	3:26
4.	"Hit Me!"	2:19
5.	"Mine for Life"	4:41
6.	"Rock & Roll"	3:52
7.	"Like a Lady"	3:29
8.	"Reggie"	3:21
9.	"Fire"	3:14
10.	"Hope You're Happy Now"	4:06
11.	"Riot"	2:57
12.	"S.O.U.N.D.S. [Bonus Track]"	3:07
Total length:		40:50

== Charts ==
=== Weekly charts ===
Chart (2002–2003)	Peak position
Norwegian Albums (VG-lista)	23
Swedish Albums (Sverigetopplistan)	3
US Independent Albums (Billboard)	31

=== Year-end charts ===
Chart (2002)	Position
Swedish Albums (Sverigetopplistan)	53
Chart (2003)	Position
Swedish Albums (Sverigetopplistan)	25
