= The Sounds =

Swedish indie rock band

- Origin: Helsingborg, Sweden
- Genres: Indie rock, new wave, post-punk revival
- Years active: 1998–present
- Labels: Original Signal Recordings (US and Canada), Warner Music Group (Europe)
- Members: Maja Ivarsson; Félix Rodríguez; Johan Richter; Jesper Anderberg; Fredrik Blond
- Website: the-sounds.com

The Sounds are a Swedish indie rock band. Formed in Helsingborg in 1998, the group's musical style has been compared to new wave acts such as Blondie, The Cars, the Epoxies and Missing Persons.

Their debut album, Living in America, was released in 2002, with the follow-up Dying to Say This to You in 2006. Their third album, Crossing the Rubicon, was released in 2009, and their fourth, Something to Die For, was released in 2011. Their fifth album, Weekend, was released in 2013. In 2017, the band released a four-track EP, The Tales That We Tell. The Sounds released their most recent album in 2020: Things We Do for Love.

== History ==
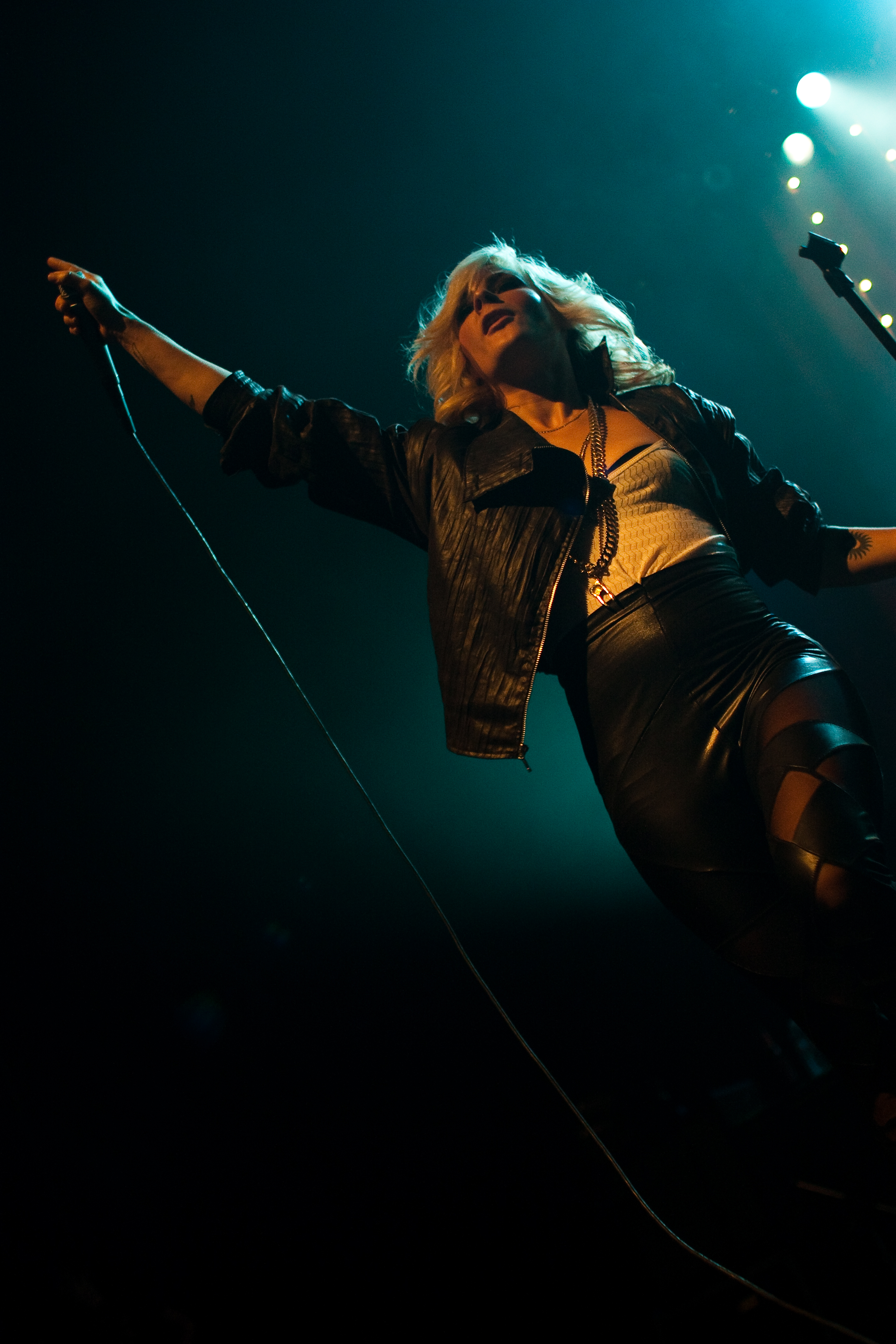
Maja Ivarsson performing

=== Formation ===
The Sounds were formed in 1998 by classmates Félix Rodríguez, Maja Ivarsson, Johan Bengtsson and Fredrik Blond in Helsingborg, Sweden. The group met Jesper Anderberg, the youngest member, by chance at the Hultsfred Festival, and he was enlisted to play keyboards and guitar. The band's name was decided months later during a trip to London. Before becoming the lead singer of the band, Ivarsson had previously played electric guitar in other local bands. Musical influences included Blondie, Duran Duran, Orchestral Manoeuvres in the Dark, and Siouxsie and the Banshees.

=== Living in America ===
Their 2002 debut album, Living in America, was recorded in Stockholm and produced by Adel Dahdal and Jimmy Monell. It earned them several "Best Newcomer" awards, a No. 4 position in the Swedish album charts and established the band not only in Sweden but also in the United States. The band has played over 500 gigs since the album's release including participating in the 2004 Warped Tour. In 2006 they played again at Warped Tour, this time on a main stage, and have toured with bands such as Foo Fighters, The Strokes, Morningwood, Angels & Airwaves, +44, Mando Diao and Panic! at the Disco.

In the United States, the band has done several TV appearances and magazine articles and has reportedly built up a celebrity fan base that includes Dave Grohl, Pharrell, Quentin Tarantino, Thomas Johnson and Robin Botten, Bam Margera and his ex-wife Missy Margera, David Desrosiers, Ben Khodadad and Britney Spears. The band has stated several times that it relies on word of mouth and concerts to promote its music.

=== Dying to Say This to You ===
The second album, Dying to Say This to You, was recorded at Studio 880 in Oakland, California, and produced by Jeff Saltzman (producer of The Killers' Hot Fuss and all but two tracks of Blondie's Panic of Girls). They started the European leg of their tour in September and in October toured with Panic! at the Disco which included dates in London and several other major European cities. Following this tour, The Sounds made another run in the United States, starting with a MySpace secret show in Miami, Florida, on Halloween and then stopping at 10 major cities from coast to coast with supporting act Shiny Toy Guns. Altogether, The Sounds played over 200 shows in 2006, over half of which were in the United States.

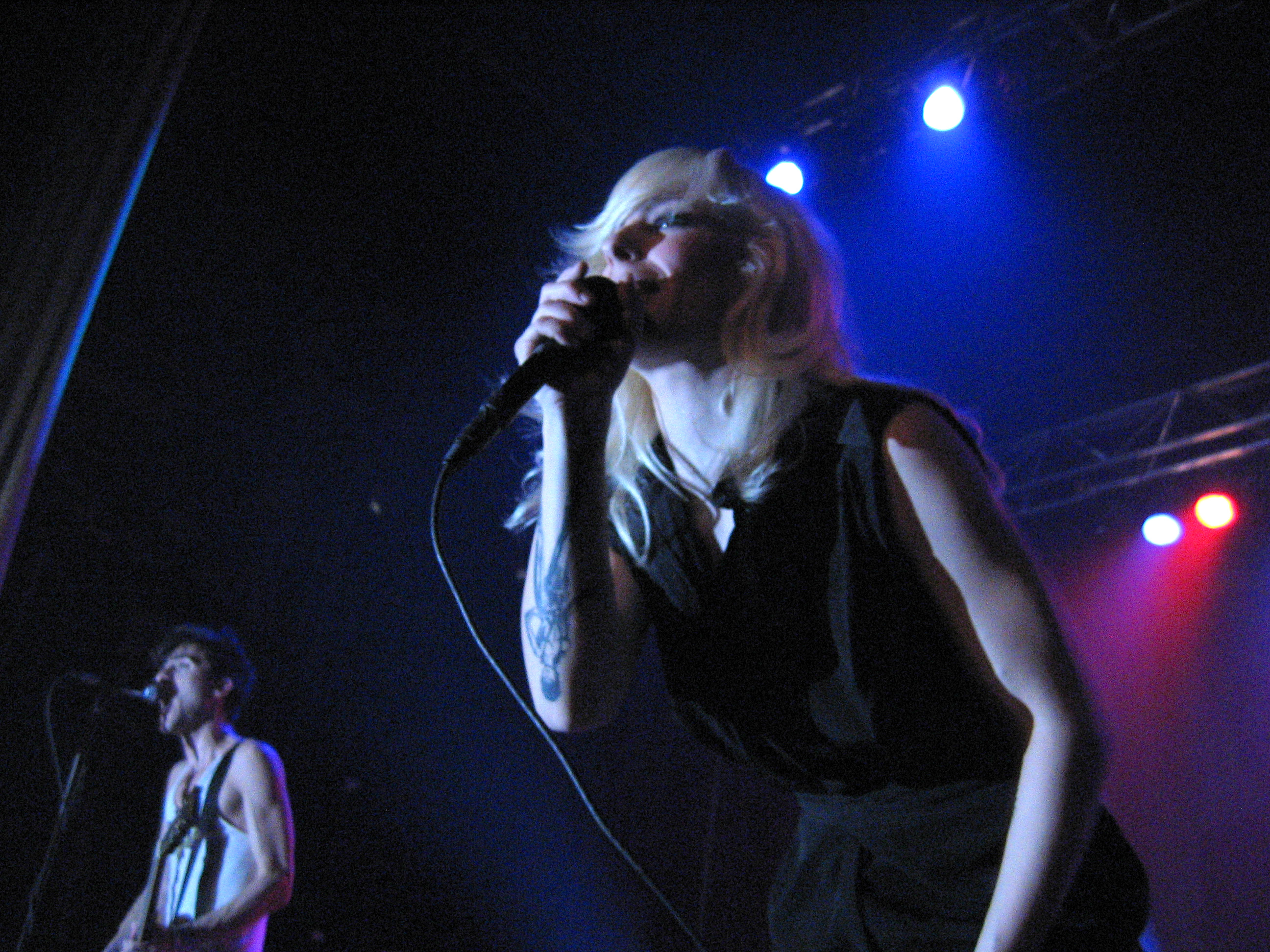
The Sounds performing in 2006

In early October 2007, The Sounds wrapped up their worldwide tour in Western Europe and Australia.

One of the band's songs, the synthpop-tinged, "Hurt You", was used in a Geico television commercial that originally aired in September 2008.

Maja Ivarsson was named in Blender Magazine's "Hottest Women of ... Rock" list.

The Sounds acknowledged and celebrated their tenth anniversary of their album Dying to Say This to You with a US tour (and two shows in Canada) from 15 November to 20 December 2016, performing the entire album live in its original track order; they also played their new single, "Thrill" (released 10 November 2016) as well as a few tracks from their earlier albums Living in America and Crossing the Rubicon.

=== Crossing the Rubicon ===
The Sounds released their third studio album Crossing the Rubicon, on 2 June 2009, via Original Signal Recordings (US and Canada) and Arnioki Records, their independent label. They collaborated with Mark Saunders as well as James Iha and Adam Schlesinger on the album. The album was mixed by Tim Palmer (Bowie, Pearl Jam, HIM, Cure) at his '62 Studios. The band performed the song "No One Sleeps When I'm Awake" on Last Call with Carson Daly on 12 February 2009, which was the first single from the album. The song was also included in CW's new show The Vampire Diaries in the "Haunted" episode. The title of the third album was inspired by Julius Caesar's act of defiance of January, 49 BC and refers to the band's separation from their previous record label and resultant independence. The album's second single, "Beatbox", was featured on American Idol. "Dorchester Hotel" was released as a third single in Germany only.

As of February 2010, two official videos have been released off of Crossing the Rubicon. They are "No One Sleeps When I'm Awake" (directed by Michael Schmelling of A76 Productions) and "Beatbox" (directed by Manuel Concha of Concha Films).

The Sounds was the special guest on the No Doubt Summer Tour in 2009, starting in May 2009 in outdoor amphitheaters and arenas across the US and Canada. The Sounds also played a series of headline shows around the US and Canada in late April and early May prior to joining the No Doubt tour. These headlining shows featured Chicago synth-rockers Hey Champ, who created a remix of "Beatbox".

On 12 September 2009, The Sounds embarked on a world tour to promote the new album. Foxy Shazam and Semi Precious Weapons joined them as support in the United States and Matt and Kim supported them in Europe.

=== Something to Die For ===
The band's next album was titled Something to Die For, and released on 29 March 2011. Lead singer Maja Ivarsson also appeared on pop-punk band All Time Low's new album Dirty Work as a guest vocalist on the track "Guts".

The first single from their new album, "Better Off Dead", was released on 1 February 2011. The track was promoted on their website with a competition, in which anyone could download the sheet music for the song, and submit their own version, to be voted on by fans (the winner's version will be included as the B-side on their upcoming 7"). Everyone who downloaded the sheet music also received the track for free 5 days early. The band released their second single, "Something to Die For", on February 22, 2011, and the single was featured on the Scream 4 soundtrack along with "Yeah Yeah Yeah". The band released the official music video for their third single, "Dance With The Devil", on May 19, 2011. A music video for the fourth single, "Yeah Yeah Yeah", was released on 16 February 2012.

=== Weekend ===
On his official Twitter feed, keyboard player Jesper Anderberg announced that The Sounds were in the studio working on their yet-to-be-named fifth studio album, which should be released around summer of 2013. The Sounds also posted pictures of their in-studio work on Twitter and on their official website, stating that they "are locked up in a studio in Sweden putting the final touches on our 5th studio album". They also said that the album "is a great reflection of our last 10 years of touring, playing live and making music together!". They will release new music in the spring, and start touring summer of 2013. On 24 April, they announced via Twitter that they have completed recording the new album.

On 16 May 2013, on their official Twitter, The Sounds posted a preview of their new single "Shake Shake Shake", the first single off of their new album. "Shake Shake Shake" was subsequently released on 23 May 2013. In June, it was revealed that The Sounds would embark on a European headline tour in November 2013.

On 23 September 2013, title track "Weekend" was released as a free download on the Nylon website. On 29 September, the band debuted a new song live, titled "Hurt the Ones I Love". The band released their fourth album, Weekend on 29 October 2013.

After the European headline tour, they returned to the US for a nationwide tour where they were accompanied by opening acts Ghost Beach, Blondfire, and Strange Talk.

=== Things We Do for Love ===
On 28 February 2020, The Sounds announced their new studio album Things We Do for Love. The band unveiled the title track and US tour that same day. Because of the COVID-19 pandemic, the band pushed back the album's release date, originally 1 May 2020, to 12 June 2020.

== Members ==
- Maja Ivarsson – vocals
- Félix Rodríguez – guitar
- Jesper Anderberg – keyboards, piano, guitar
- Johan Richter – bass
- Fredrik Blond (formerly Fredrik Nilsson) – drums

== Discography ==
Studio albums

- Living in America (2002)
- Dying to Say This to You (2006)
- Crossing the Rubicon (2009)
- Something to Die For (2011)
- Weekend (2013)
- Things We Do for Love (2020)

Studio EPs

- The Tales That We Tell – EP (2017)

== See also ==
- List of Swedes in music
- List of Warner Music Group artists
