= Tonight Alive discography =

Band discography

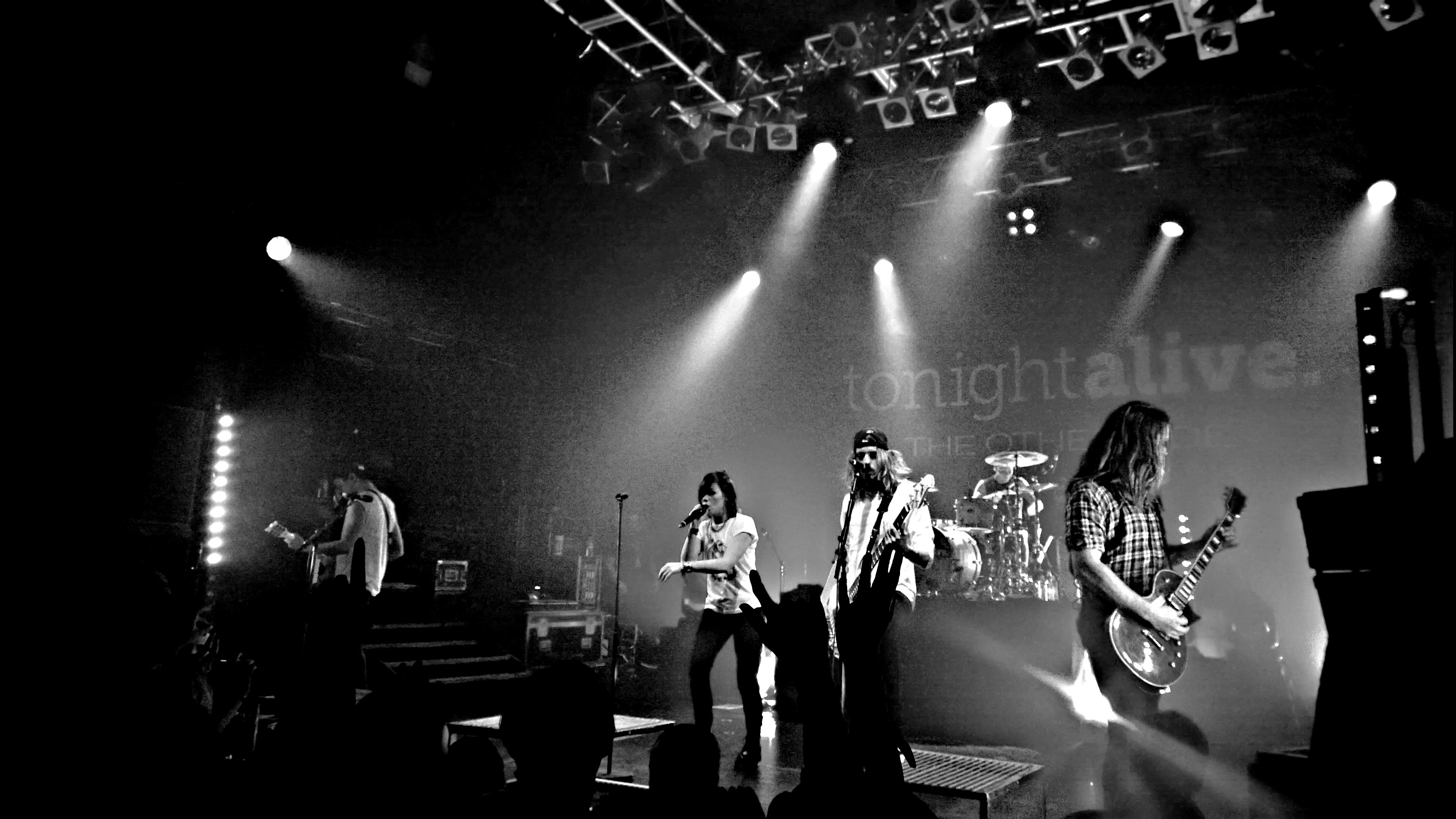
- Tonight Alive during a concert in London, November 2014
- Studio albums: 4
- EPs: 3
- Singles: 17
- Music videos: 17

The discography of the Australian rock band Tonight Alive consists of four studio albums, three extended plays, seventeen singles and seventeen music videos.

== Albums ==
=== Studio albums ===
List of studio albums, with selected chart positions shown
Title	Details	Chart positions				
Title	Details	AUS	US	US Alt	US Rock	US Indie
What Are You So Scared Of?	Released: 14 October 2011; Label: Fearless, Sony Music	15	—	—	48	32
The Other Side	Released: 6 September 2013; Label: Fearless, Sony Music	5	43	12	15	8
Limitless	Released: 4 March 2016; Label: Fearless, Sony Music	6	—	20	23	12
Underworld	Released: 12 January 2018; Label: UNFD, Hopeless	11	—	—	—	—

=== EPs ===
Year	Album
2010	All Shapes & Disguises: Released 1 March 2010; Label: Takedown, re-released by Sony Music in 2011
2010	Consider This: Released 12 November 2010; Label: Takedown, re-released by Sony Music and Fearless in 2011
2011	Let It Land: Released 14 October 2011; Label: Sony Music

== Singles ==
List of singles, with selected chart positions shown
Title	Year	Peak chart positions		Album
Title	Year	AUS	UK Rock	Album
"Wasting Away"	2010	—	—	Consider This
"Starlight"	2011	—	—	What Are You So Scared Of?
"Let It Land"	2011	—	—	What Are You So Scared Of?
"Listening"	2012	—	—	What Are You So Scared Of?
"Breakdown" (featuring Benji Madden)	2013	66	—	Non-album single
"The Ocean"	2013	—	—	The Other Side
"Lonely Girl"	2013	—	—	The Other Side
"Come Home"	2013	—	—	The Other Side
"The Edge"	2014	78	1	The Amazing Spider-Man 2 OST
"Human Interaction"	2015	—	—	Limitless
"To Be Free"	2015	—	—	Limitless
"Drive"	2015	—	—	Limitless
"How Does It Feel?"	2016	—	—	Limitless
"World Away"	2017	—	—	Non-album single
"Temple"	2017	—	—	Underworld
"Crack My Heart"	2017	—	—	Underworld
"Disappear" (featuring Lyndsey Gunnulfsen)	2018	—	—	Underworld

== Original compilation appearances ==
Year	Compilation	Song
2011	Punk Goes Pop Volume 4	"Little Lion Man" (Mumford & Sons cover)

== Videography ==
=== Music videos ===
Year	Song	Director
2010	"Wasting Away"	Mick Gumley
2011	"Starlight"	Mikey Hamer
2011	"Let It Land"	
2011	"Breaking & Entering"	
2012	"Listening"	Mark Staubach
2013	"Breakdown" (featuring Benji Madden)	
2013	"The Ocean"	Sam Roenfeldt
2013	"Lonely Girl"	Bill Stepanoski
2013	"Come Home"	Scott Fleishman
2014	"The Edge"	Adam Callen
2015	"Human Interaction"	Anthony Rose
2016	"How Does It Feel?"	David Burrowes
2016	"Drive"	Matt Sharp
2017	"World Away"	Megan Thompson
2017	"Temple"	Neal Walters
2017	"Crack My Heart"	Neal Walters
2018	"Disappear" (featuring Lyndsey Gunnulfsen)	Neal Walters
