= Yellow light =

Yellow light may refer to:

== Other uses ==
- Light in the visible color spectrum that is yellow (575~594 nm)
- A yellow traffic light (also described as an "amber light")
- Manjal Veiyil (English: Yellow Light), a 2009 Tamil language film starring Prasanna and Sandhya in the lead roles

== Songs ==
- "Yellow Light", by Pharrell Williams, created for the soundtrack of the 2017 film Despicable Me 3
- "Yellow Light", by Of Monsters and Men on My Head Is an Animal
- "Yellow Light", by Silver Sun from Silver Sun

== See also ==
- "Yellow light of death" (YLOD), an issue reported with the PlayStation 3
- Light yellow, a shade of yellow
- Light Yellow, an X11 color name
