= Consider This =

Consider This may refer to:

- Consider This (album), an album by Aaron Pritchett
- Consider This (EP), an EP by Tonight Alive
- Consider This (talk show), a weeknight current events talk show on Al Jazeera America
- Consider This (podcast), a daily NPR news podcast
