= Masketta Fall =

Australian pop-rock group

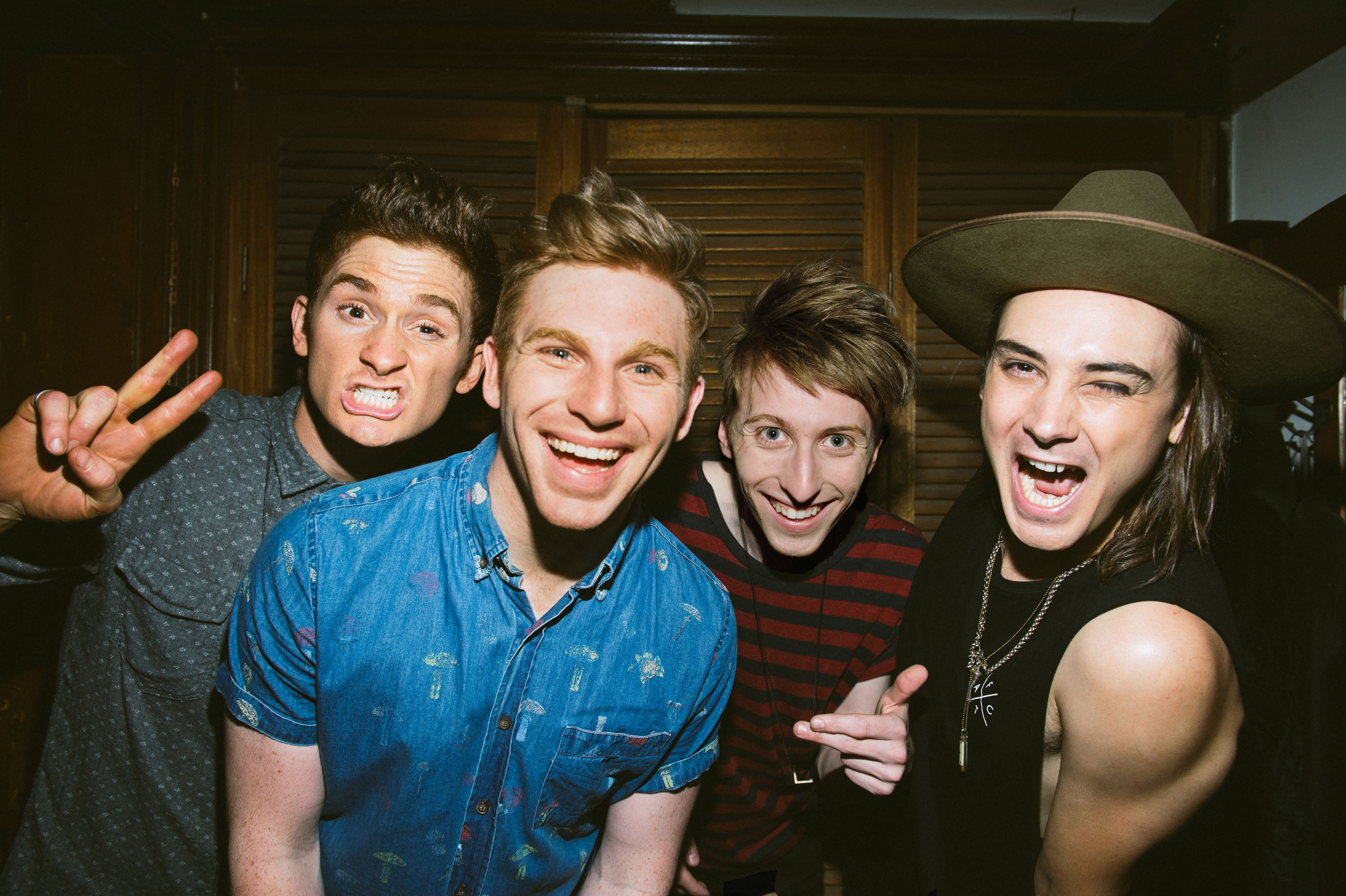
- "Love Me Like That" line-up, 2016

Background information
- Origin: Melbourne, Victoria, Australia
- Genre: Pop rock
- Years active: 2012–2017
- Labels: Island; Universal
- Past members: Braden Ross; Benjamin Downing; Daniel Molivas; Jamie Ross; Ryan Spiller; Corey Thompson; Ryan Hill; Luke McMurray; Cameron "Slug" Joseph; Daniel Ciabotti; Chris "Crispy" White; Cameron "The Weapon" Clifford; Chris "the Sparky" Anderson; Jonty "Cables" Pitman
- Website: maskettafall.com

Masketta Fall were an Australian pop-rock group formed in 2012 by Braden Ross on vocals, Ben Downing on vocals and guitar, Daniel Molivas on vocals and guitar, Jamie Ross on drums, and Ryan Spiller on bass guitar. They released a studio album, Golden (November 2016), four extended plays and six singles. They supported tours by other artists, 5 Seconds of Summer, Anberlin, You Me at Six and Tonight Alive, American Authors, the Vamps and Demi Lovato. They headlined their own tours of Australia. On 3 May 2017 Masketta Fall announced an indefinite hiatus after Molivas became too ill to perform.

== History ==
Masketta Fall were formed in 2012 as an alternative rock group in Werribee, a suburb of Melbourne, by Braden Ross on vocals, Ben Downing on vocals and guitar, Daniel Molivas on vocals and guitar, Jamie Ross on drums and Ryan Spiller on bass guitar and keyboards. Molivas and the Ross brothers had all attended Werribee Secondary College. A commonly accepted myth is that the group's name refers to a dog that Daniel was walking along a beach, Masketta, which fell down a cliff but survived. They actually created their name by looking at Marshall amp and a basket and then added a random word after the made up word "Masketta" fall.

The group played shows at high schools, busked out front of live venues, and formed an online fan group, the Masketeers. The band supported a national tour by For Our Hero in mid-2012 and then 5 Seconds of Summer in August. They independently released their debut extended play, Something Beautiful, in September with the associated single, "Do You Wanna Dance". The track was co-written by Downing and Molivas.

Masketta Fall supported a tour by Anberlin in August 2013. They headlined their own tour in October and November to promote their second EP, Parachute (October 2013), with its title track issued as a single. It was co-written by Downing, Molivas and Ross with Michael Delorenzis and Michael Paynter. Spiller left soon after and the group continued as a four-piece.

In November 2014 Masketta Fall signed a record deal with Universal Music Australia after being scouted whilst on tour with American indie rock band, American Authors. Their first single on the label, "Summertime Girls", was released on 5 December 2014, which gained high rotation on Australian commercial radio. It was co-written by Downing, Molivas, Ross, Delorenzis and Paynter. It peaked at No. 6 on the ARIA Hitseekers Singles Chart.

In 2015 the band supported the Vamps, Demi Lovato and McBusted across Australia, and headlined Canberra's annual Sky Fire event with over 100,000 in attendance. Their next single "Love Me Like That" was released on 15 January 2016. Their debut album, Golden, appeared on 25 November 2016 along with its lead single, "I Believe". On 3 May 2017 the band announced on social media that Daniel Molivas was ill with chronic fatigue syndrome and his condition wasn't improving, leaving him unable to work. As a result, they announced that they would be going on an indefinite hiatus.

== Tours ==
Supporting act

- 5 Seconds of Summer Twenty Twelve Tour (August 2012)
- Anberlin Australian Tour (September 2013)
- Warped Tour Australia (December 2013)
- You Me at Six and Tonight Alive Tour (September 2014)
- American Authors Australia Tour (September 2014)
- The Vamps (January 2015)
- McBusted (February 2015)
- Demi Lovato Demi World Tour – Australian leg (April 2015)

Headline

- Something Beautiful EP Launch Tour (September & October 2012)
- Do You Wanna Dance Tour (April & May 2013)
- Parachute EP Launch Tour (October 2013)
- "Big Dog" Adventure (July 2014)

== Discography ==
=== Albums ===
Year	Album	Peak positions
Year	Album	AUS
2016	Golden: Release date: 25 November 2016; Label: Masketta Fall (Independent)	—

=== Extended plays ===
Year	Album	Peak positions
Year	Album	AUS
2012	Something Beautiful: Release date: 23 September 2012; Label: Masketta Fall (Independent)	—
2013	Parachute: Release date: 4 October 2013; Label: Masketta Fall (Independent)	—
2014	Summer of Love: Release date: 1 December 2014; Label: Masketta Fall (Independent)	—
2016	Summer Series: Release date: 1 January 2016; Label: Masketta Fall (Independent)	—

=== Singles ===
Year	Singles	Peak positions	Album
Year	Singles	AUS	Album
2012	"Do You Wanna Dance"	—	Something Beautiful
2013	"Parachute"	—	Parachute
2014	"Big Dog"	—	Non-album singles
2014	"Summertime Girls"	—	Non-album singles
2016	"Love Me Like That"	—	Non-album singles
2016	"I Believe"	—	Golden
