= The Other Side (Tonight Alive album) =

Studio album by Tonight Alive
- Released: 6 September 2013
- Studios: Sapphire Beach Acreage, Coffs Harbour, Australia
- Genres: Pop punk; pop rock; alternative rock; emo pop
- Length: 39:52
- Labels: Fearless; Sony Music
- Producer: Dave Petrovic

Tonight Alive chronology
What Are You So Scared Of? (2011)	The Other Side (2013)	Limitless (2016)

Singles from The Other Side
- 1. "The Ocean" Released: 24 June 2013; 2. "Lonely Girl" Released: 31 July 2013; 3. "Come Home" Released: 20 September 2013

The Other Side is the second studio album by the Australian rock band Tonight Alive.

== Background ==
On 12 March 2013 the group released as a music video for "Breakdown", a track that features Benji Madden of Good Charlotte. In March and April 2013, the group supported The Story So Far and Man Overboard on their co-headlining US tour, dubbed The Suppy Nation Tour. Sessions were held at Sapphire Beach Acreage in Coffs Harbour, New South Wales, Australia, with producer and engineer Dave Petrovic. Dan Korneff mixed the recordings at Sonic Debris Recording Studio in New York City, United States; Brad Blackwood mastered the album at Euphonic Masters.

== Composition ==
Vocalist Jenna McDougall spoke to Alternative Press about the record:

"There are definitely some sad songs on the album, and I think there are a few heartbreakers, but there are also songs like 'The Fire' that's a super-liberating, empowering punk song. I'm so proud of that song because the lyrics are really passionate, affirmative and positive, but the music is really aggressive. [...]
"We are quite, not a bipolar band, but I think this album is really about finding our sound but at the same time also accepting that we don't have one particular sound. Not all our songs are going to be the same, and you can't put them under the same umbrella. Some of them are poppy, some of them are really heavy and some of them are somewhere in the middle. We found a balance on this record, and I'm proud of that because I think it's just being true as human beings. You can be at both ends of the scale."

McDougall explained that there is "a lot more cohesive [because] I know my voice a lot better. I'm excited because the songs have got a very pop structure but [they've] still got a lot of edge." The title track was originally three verses longer but the band edited the track down. This original version was more country-orientated and was inspired by "Your Guardian Angel" by the Red Jumpsuit Apparatus. It was edited down as the band expected the song to be released as a single and work "better as a radio song", according to McDougall. She found the decision "hard for me" as the song was personal to her. The chorus was completely rewritten a moment before McDougall was going to record her vocals for the song. It "tells the story of going from being friends to falling in love, and then the complications that followed before becoming just friends again."

== Release ==
Following a BBC Radio 1 premier, a lyric video was released for "The Ocean" on 12 June. On 20 July it was announced that The Other Side would be released in September. On 31 July 2013, the band revealed the track listing on their Facebook page. "The Ocean" was released as the album's first single to digital outlets and YouTube preceding the album. "Lonely Girl" was later made as an instant download for those pre-ordering the album through iTunes. Preceded by a teaser trailer, a music video was released for "Lonely Girl" on 15 August. On 31 August "Hell and Back" was made available for streaming. The Other Side was released through Sony Music Australia on 6 September and made available for streaming the following day. The album was released in Europe and the UK on 9 September and 10 September in the US through Fearless Records as well as Japan on 11 September. Following this, the band embarked on a headlining Australian tour with support from Hands Like Houses and D at Sea. They then went on a European tour with Set It Off and Decade.

On 25 September a music video was released for "Come Home". The band then supported You Me at Six on their US tour in October, before embarking on their own headlining US tour, dubbed The Other Side Tour, until November. They were supported by The Downtown Fiction, For the Foxes and Echosmith. The band then performed as part of Warped Tour Australia in November and December. In early March 2014, the band released a music video for "The Ocean". In March and April, the group supported Taking Back Sunday and the Used on their co-headlining US tour. In August, the group appeared at the Reading and Leeds Festivals in the UK. In September, the group went on a co-headlining Australian tour with You Me at Six. They were supported by Call the Shots, With Confidence, Masketta Fall and Day Break. In October and November, the band supported Mayday Parade in ontheir headlining US tour, titled the Honeymoon Tour. Following this, the group went on a UK tour. During one of the shows, the band performed The Other Side in its entirety. In February and March 2015, the band performed at Soundwave festival in Australia.

== Critical reception ==
Professional ratings
Review scores
Source	Rating
Allmusic	4/5 stars
Alternative Press	3.5/5 stars
Alter the Press!	5/5 stars
Kerrang!	5/5 stars
Punknews.org	2.5/5 stars
Rock Sound	8/10 stars
Music Mayhem Magazine	5/5 stars

The Other Side debuted at No. 5 on the Australian ARIA albums chart, No. 43 on the US Billboard 200 and No. 59 in the UK. It received positive reviews from critics, with praise for the album's direction and musicianship.

The Other Side received very positive reviews upon its release. Rob Foster of Kill Your Stereo reviewed the album positively: "The Other Side isn't just a step in the right direction. No, it's miles further than that. This is certainly the most accomplished thing Tonight Alive have released in their career yet, and frankly, given the quality of their previous releases, that says a lot. Tonight Alive are an excellent representation of Australian music in the international market, and 'The Other Side' backs that up magnificently." The Other Side was nominated for Best Album at the Kerrang! Awards.

== Track listing ==
All songs written by Jenna McDougall and Whakaio Taahi, except where noted.

No.	Title	Length
1.	"The Ocean"	3:01
2.	"Don't Wish"	3:51
3.	"Lonely Girl"	3:11
4.	"Hell and Back"	3:24
5.	"The Other Side" (McDougall, Taahi, Mark Weinberg)	3:40
6.	"The Fire"	2:47
7.	"Complexes"	4:08
8.	"Come Home"	3:27
9.	"Bathwater"	3:12
10.	"No Different"	2:37
11.	"Say Please"	3:14
12.	"You Don't Owe Me Anything"	3:20
Total length:		39:52

Japanese bonus track
13. "Breakdown (feat. Benji Madden)"

== Personnel ==
Personnel per booklet.

Tonight Alive

- Jenna McDougall – lead vocals
- Whakaio Taahi – guitar, backing vocals, strings, keyboards
- Jake Hardy – guitar
- Cam Adler – bass guitar, backing vocals
- Matty Best – drums

Additional musicians

- Wayne Richmond – strings, keyboards, programming,

Production and design

- Dave Petrovic – producer, engineer
- Dan Korneff – mixing
- Brad Blackwood – mastering
- Tonight Alive – art direction
- Ryan Clark – design

== Charts ==
Chart performance
Chart (2013)	Peak position
Australian Albums (ARIA)	5
Japanese Albums (Oricon)	166
Scottish Albums (Official Charts)	59
UK Albums (Official Charts)	59
UK Rock & Metal Albums (Official Charts)	5
US Billboard 200	43
US Independent Albums (Billboard)	8
US Top Alternative Albums (Billboard)	12
US Top Rock Albums (Billboard)	15
