= Hidden Figures (score) =

Hidden Figures (Original Score)

Film score by Hans Zimmer, Pharrell Williams and Benjamin Wallfisch
- Released: January 9, 2017
- Recorded: 2016
- Genre: Film score
- Length: 49:56
- Label: Sony Masterworks

Hans Zimmer chronology
Inferno (2015)	Hidden Figures (2016)	The Boss Baby (2017)

Pharrell Williams chronology
The Amazing Spider-Man 2 (2014)	Hidden Figures (2016)	Despicable Me 3 (2017)

Benjamin Wallfisch chronology
Mully (2016)	Hidden Figures (2016)	A Cure for Wellness (2017)

Hidden Figures (Original Score) is the score album jointly composed by Hans Zimmer, Pharrell Williams and Benjamin Wallfisch for the 2016 American biographical drama film Hidden Figures. It was released on January 9, 2017, by Sony Masterworks. The score consists of gospel music blended with acoustic and electronic music, to provide computer-like textures. It additionally features African-American female vocalists performing the background score, and features several musical artists, including Herbie Hancock to work on the score.

Because of the involvement of more than two composers producing music for the film, the score was ruled ineligible to be shortlisted for Best Original Score at the 89th Academy Awards. However, it was nominated for Golden Globe Award for Best Original Score and Grammy Award for Best Score Soundtrack for Visual Media, while receiving other accolades.

== Development ==
Zimmer and Wallfisch initially provided the first set of score cues, with Williams, who co-wrote the original songs for the film and produced the soundtrack. The score was mostly drawn from Williams' original songs featured in the soundtrack. Wallfisch stated that "the bass lines, the chord progressions, the rhythmic intensity — building the score from that place meant there could be a real dance between the score and the songs throughout the movie, a synergy".

Both the composers worked to include Afro-American women to provide vocals in the film score, as Zimmer in an interview to The Hollywood Reporter, said that "Either you have the idea of mathematics, which is the Philip Glass thing, or you have preconceived ideas like The Right Stuff (1983) or Apollo 13 (1995). But nothing in the music ever hints at an African-American, let alone female, undercurrent." As a result, they approached several female players from the Afro-American community, across the world while also featuring prominent musicians, including jazz player Herbie Hancock to play the piano.

"We flew players in from all over the country, and we had this truly extraordinary string section. The sound was more beautiful and more committed…because everybody knew what they were playing because they were playing about themselves. And that is sort of the way music is supposed to work"

— Zimmer, on the scoring of Hidden Figures.

Kim Burrell and Clydene Jackson provided solo vocals, with choirs from Dallas and Los Angeles, providing the gospel score. The composers worked on "examining the harmonies and infusing them into the thematic writing". Speaking to Variety magazine, Wallfisch attributed that one of his guitarist friends had pulsed textures, and included them through several passes of a tape emulator to bring back to the sound of those early reel-to-reel machines and moog synthesisers, reversed and layered those tunes. He attributed that the "sound and the piano became the sound of Katherine's brain". He also stated that the trumpet lines, were inspired from Miles Davis' compositions, which consists of solo jazz elements.

The score blends electric guitars with acoustic cues to bring "computer-like, technical textures". Wallfisch commented that "We used the core-progressions and harmonic sensibility of gospel music, even with a choir, it's the way you voice the string chords, somehow effortlessly gave us that language for the score."

== Track listing ==
Hidden Figures (Original Score)
No.	Title	Length
1.	"Katherine"	02:33
2.	"Mission Control"	01:15
3.	"I'd Already Be One"	01:08
4.	"Space Task Group"	02:56
5.	"Slice of Pie"	01:04
6.	"Redacted"	01:24
7.	"With All the Angels"	01:34
8.	"Redstone"	01:36
9.	"Call Your Wives"	03:20
10.	"Launch"	02:19
11.	"That's Just The Way Things Are"	02:23
12.	"Sign"	01:11
13.	"Kitchen Kiss"	00:55
14.	"Mary and the Judge"	01:29
15.	"I Like Her Numbers"	02:03
16.	"Ladies' March"	01:23
17.	"Mary and Levi"	02:11
18.	"Euler's Method"	01:23
19.	"Proposal"	01:39
20.	"Katherine Calculates"	01:32
21.	"Pearls"	02:39
22.	"Lift Off"	03:11
23.	"Warning Light"	00:58
24.	"Rocket Peril"	03:09
25.	"Hidden Figures"	03:49
26.	"Epilogue"	00:36

== Reception ==
Filmtracks.com wrote: "While the character of the score remains cohesive outside of this celebration motif, the themes, oddly enough, are only faintly coherent, and they make no obvious connections to the songs. The various motifs seem to waft through the score seemingly without tightly associating with particular characters. Thus, you have a combined compositional effort involving Zimmer that continues to cause some issues with narrative continuity, but Hidden Figures manages to overcome these issues with its tightly knit cultural personality" and concluded "a delightfully competent handling of the subject despite its sometimes wandering motific assignments". Marvelous Geeks Media described the score as "incredibly refreshing and beautiful" and further wrote: "The harmonies in the background of certain tracks add a sense of serenity that's hard to miss when listening to the album, and once you're one track in, it's nearly impossible to stop listening until you've finished the entire album."

== Personnel ==
Credits adapted from CD liner notes

- Recording engineers – Seth Waldmann, Alfredo Pasquel, Denis St. Amand
- Score engineers – Chuck Choi, Stephanie McNally
- Musical assistance – Cynthia Park
- Technical assistance – Max Sandler
- Music coordinator – Joann Orgel
- Music editor – Catherine Wilson, Richard Ford
- Music supervision – Anton Monsted
- Music preparation – Booker White
- Mastering – Patric Sullivan
- Mixing – John Witt Chapman, Mick Guzauski
- Vocal recordist – Mike Larson
- Score recordist – Kevin Globerman, Alan Meyerson, Tim Lauber
- Backing vocals – Alfie Silas Durio, Angel Robinson, Bobette Harrison, Briana Lee, Carmel Echols, Carmen Carter, Carmen Twillie, Charlean Carmon, Clydene Jackson, Debette Draper, Denise Carite, Deonis Cook, Dorian Holley, Edie Lehmann Boddicker, Elgin A. Johnson, Eric Birdine, Eternia Garrett, Faith Anderson, James McCrary, Jim Gilstrap, Josef Powell, KieAndria Ellis, Kim Burrell, Linda Fisher, Louis Price, Myron Butler, Nathan Myers, Nayanna Holley, Niya Cotton, Sheléa Frazier, Sobya Ball, Stevie Mackey, Tameka Sanford
- Solo vocals – Clydene Jackson, Kim Burrell
- Featured musicians:
  - Cello – Adrienne Woods, Armen Ksajikian, Cecilia Tsan, Giovanna Clayton, Jacob Braun, Michelle Elliott, Paula Hochhalter, Vanessa Freebairn-Smith, Xiaodan Helen Altenbach, Steve Erdody
  - Contrabass – Drew Dembowski, Edward Meares, Karl Vincent-Wickliff, Michael Valerio, Oscar Hidalgo, Stephen Dress, Nico Carmine Abondolo
  - Horn – Dylan Hart, Steve Becknell, Andrew Bain
  - Saxophone – Bob Sheppard, Daniel Higgins
  - Piano – Herbie Hancock
  - Trombone – John Lofton, Andrew Martin, Alexander Iles
  - Trumpet – Barry Perkins, Daniel Fornero, Wayne Bergeron, Thomas Hooten, Johnny Britt
  - Viola – Alma Fernandez, Andrew Duckles, Brian Dembow, Dale Hikawa-Silverman, David Walther, John Zach Dellinger, Laura Pearson, Lynne Richburg, Matthew Funes, Meredith Crawford, Nikki Shorts, Robin Ross, Sharon Ray, Shawn Mann, Robert A. Brophy
  - Violin – Alyssa Park, Amy Hershberger, Ana Landauer, Bianca McClure, Chris Woods, Crystal Alforque, Dale Briedenthal, Grace Oh, Helen Nightengale, Irina Voloshina, Jessica Guideri, Josefina Vergara, Kevin Kumar, Lauren Baba, Lisa Liu, Luanne Homzy, Lucia Micarelli, Maia Jasper White, Mark K. Cargill, Maya Magub, Melissa White, Nadira Scruggs, Neil Samples, Phillip Levy, Roberto Cani, Ron Clark, Sara Parkins, Sarah Thornblade, Serena McKinney, Shalini Vijayan, Sharon Jackson, Shigeru Logan, Songa Lee, Susan Chatman, Tamara Hatwan, Tereza Stanislav, Julie Ann Gigante
- Orchestra and choir:
  - Orchestrator – David Krystal
  - Additional orchestration – Edward Trybek, Henri Wilkinson
  - Assistant orchestrator – Kory McMaster, Sean Barrett
  - Orchestra leader – Tim Williams
  - Orchestra conductor – Timothy Williams
  - Orchestra contractor – Peter Rotter
  - Choir contractor– Edie Lehmann Boddicker
  - Choir arrangements – Kirk Franklin
- Business affairs – Tom Cavanaugh
- Executive in-charge of music – Danielle Diego
- Music clearance – Ellen Ginsburg
- Music management – Johnny Choi
- Music production services – Steven Kofsky
- Music production supervision – Rebecca Morellato
- Stage managers – Christine Sirois, Tom Steel, Shalini Singh

== Accolades ==
Award/Festival	Date of ceremony	Category	Recipient(s)	Result	Ref.
Black Reel Awards	February 16, 2017	Outstanding Original Score	Hans Zimmer, Pharrell Williams and Benjamin Wallfisch	Nominated	
Golden Globe Awards	January 8, 2017	Best Original Score	Hans Zimmer, Pharrell Williams and Benjamin Wallfisch	Nominated	
Grammy Awards	January 28, 2018	Best Score Soundtrack for Visual Media	Hidden Figures – Benjamin Wallfisch, Pharrell Williams, Hans Zimmer	Nominated	
Satellite Awards	February 19, 2017	Best Original Score	Hans Zimmer, Pharrell Williams and Benjamin Wallfisch	Nominated	
