= It's On Again =

Single by Alicia Keys featuring Kendrick Lamar

from the album The Amazing Spider-Man 2: The Original Motion Picture Soundtrack
- Released: March 31, 2014
- Studio: South Beach Studios (Miami, FL); Conway Recording Studios (Los Angeles, CA); Remote Control Productions (Santa Monica, CA); Oven Studios (Long Island, NY)
- Genre: R&B; hip-hop
- Length: 3:49
- Label: RCA
- Songwriters: Alicia Keys; Pharrell Williams; Hans Zimmer; Kendrick Lamar
- Producers: Williams; Zimmer

Alicia Keys singles chronology
| "I Will Pray (Pregherò)" (2013) | "It's On Again" (2014) | "We Are Here" (2014) |

Kendrick Lamar singles chronology
| "Nosetalgia" (2014) | "It's On Again" (2014) | "i" (2014) |

Music video
- "It's On Again" on YouTube

"It's On Again" is a song by American singer Alicia Keys featuring American rapper Kendrick Lamar. The song was written for the 2014 superhero film The Amazing Spider-Man 2 by the artist alongside the producers, Hans Zimmer, who scored the film, and Pharrell Williams. It was released on March 31, 2014 as the lead single from the film's soundtrack. The song was nominated at the 15th Black Reel Awards for Outstanding Original Song.

== Critical reception ==
Todd Martens of Los Angeles Times wrote that the song "feels a little like two songs smashed into one", one "underscored by slow-rising synths that add heft to the generally fierce intensity of Lamar" and the other "keeps Keys relatively restrained, as her voice sticks close to a warm beat", praising Pharrell and Zimmer production.

== Music video ==
The music video of "It's On Again" was released on April 14, 2014 on Vevo and was directed by Rich Lee. It features appearances from the involved musicians and footage of the film.

== Release ==
On March 12, 2014, Columbia Records issued a press release announcing that "It's On Again" would be included on the soundtrack for The Amazing Spider-Man 2 (2014) and serve as the closing song for the film. The release included a statement from director Marc Webb, who described the process of selecting "a song that would be upbeat and exciting, but also contain a note of foreboding" to serve as the film's closing theme and praised "It's On Again" as the "perfect end note." Keys also expressed her excitement at working with Kendrick Lamar, producer Pharrell Williams and film composer Hans Zimmer, the latter of whom scores the film. On March 31, "It's On Again" was uploaded to Keys' official SoundCloud page and impacted mainstream urban radio in the United States. The following day, it was released digitally as a single.

== Live performances ==
The songs was performed for the first time on television on The Tonight Show with Jimmy Fallon. The song was also performed at the film's premiere concert in New York City.

== Commercial performance ==
"It's On Again" debuted on the Billboard Adult R&B Songs and Hot R&B/Hip-Hop Airplay charts at numbers 17 and 40 respectively on the chart week ending April 19, 2014.

== Track listing ==
- Digital download
1. "It's On Again" (featuring Kendrick Lamar) – 3:49
2. "It's On Again" – 3:14

== Charts ==
=== Weekly charts ===
| Chart (2014) | Peak position |
|---|---|
| Australia (ARIA) | 81 |
| Belgium (Ultratip Bubbling Under Flanders) | 16 |
| Belgium Urban (Ultratop Flanders) | 30 |
| Belgium (Ultratip Bubbling Under Wallonia) | 18 |
| France (SNEP) | 62 |
| Germany (GfK) | 95 |
| Germany (Deutsche Black Charts) | 39 |
| Italy (FIMI) | 98 |
| Japan (Japan Hot 100) (Billboard) | 33 |
| Netherlands (Dutch Top 40 Tipparade) | 2 |
| Slovakia (Rádio Top 100) | 31 |
| UK Singles (OCC) | 31 |
| UK Hip Hop/R&B (OCC) | 7 |
| US Adult R&B Songs (Billboard) | 16 |
| US Hot R&B/Hip-Hop Songs (Billboard) | 49 |

=== Year-end charts ===
| Chart (2014) | Position |
|---|---|
| Belgium Urban Singles | 91 |

== Release history ==
| Region | Date | Format | Label |
|---|---|---|---|
| United States | March 31, 2014 | Mainstream urban radio | RCA Records |
| United States | April 1, 2014 | Digital download | RCA Records |
| United Kingdom | April 10, 2014 | Urban contemporary radio | RCA Records |
| Italy | April 11, 2014 | Contemporary hit radio | Sony Music |
| United States | April 15, 2014 | Urban contemporary radio | RCA Records |
