= Freedom (Pharrell Williams song) =

Single by Pharrell Williams

from the album Despicable Me 3 (Original Motion Picture Soundtrack)
- Released: June 30, 2015
- Recorded: 2015
- Genre: Indie pop
- Length: 2:43
- Label: Columbia
- Songwriter: Pharrell Williams
- Producer: Pharrell Williams

Pharrell Williams singles chronology
"Finna Get Loose" (2015)	"Freedom" (2015)	"WTF (Where They From)" (2015)

"Freedom" (stylized as FREEDOM!) is a song written, produced, and performed by American musician Pharrell Williams which was released for streaming on Apple Music and played by Zane Lowe on his show on Beats 1 on its launch date of June 30, 2015. Part of the song was made available as a teaser on Williams' Twitter page and was also used in a promotional video for Apple Music. Its music video was nominated for Best Music Video at the 58th Grammy Awards.

== Critical reception ==
Writing for MusicSnake, Marissa Fitzgerald gave the song a very positive review, give it 4/5 stars and stating "'Freedom' is an awesome track with a feel-good vibe and a positive message. The lyrics are uplifting and promote living a happy life without restrictions or limitations." Rolling Stone describes the track, "powerful," as well as, "snappy," and, "infectious," while The Guardian describes it as, "socially conscious." According to USA Today, "Williams may have found a song that captures the tenor of its time."

== Live performances ==
Williams performed the song on his international 2015 tour, including during his set at Glastonbury Festival 2015 on the Pyramid Stage on Saturday June 27. Williams also performed this single at the 2015 MTV Video Music Awards and the 2015 MTV Europe Music Awards. Williams performed the song on The Tonight Show Starring Jimmy Fallon on Friday September 11. Williams also performed the song with a full orchestra during a guest appearance at Hans Zimmer's live set at the Coachella Valley Music and Arts Festival on Sunday April 16, 2017.

== In other media ==
- In 2017, the song was used for an advert of the telecommunications company Claro by its subsidiary in Argentina.
- In 2017, the song was used in a Nissan Navara commercial.
- In 2016, the song was used in an Aetna commercial
- In 2018, the song was used in a Bank of America commercial.
- In 2017, the song appeared on the soundtrack for Despicable Me 3, which Williams also produces the music for the franchise.
- In 2017 the song was in the Los Angeles bid for the 2028 Summer Olympics.
- In 2017, the song was used for an advert of the Dutch energy supplier, Eneco.
- In 2016, the song was played prior to the concession speech delivered by Hillary Rodham Clinton, the Democratic Party's candidate for President of the United States in the 2016 U.S. Presidential Election.
- In 2016, the song was used in adverts for New Zealand telecommunication company, Spark.
- In 2016, the song appeared in the movie, Now You See Me 2.
- In 2015, the song was used for an advert of the German television transmitter, Sky Deutschland.
- In 2019, the song was used in Walmart's new clothing ad for their We Dress America campaign.
- In 2016, the song was used in a Fiat 500X UK commercial.
- In the late 2017, the song was used for the Close-Up Toothpaste commercial.
- In 2025, the song was used in the finale of the first season of the TV series Suits LA.

== Charts ==
=== Weekly charts ===
Chart (2015)	Peak position
Australia (ARIA)	41
Austria (Ö3 Austria Top 40)	61
Belgium (Ultratop 50 Flanders)	2
Belgium Airplay (Ultratop Flanders)	1
Belgium Urban (Ultratop Flanders)	1
Belgium (Ultratop 50 Wallonia)	2
Belgium Airplay (Ultratop Wallonia)	6
Czech Republic Airplay (ČNS IFPI)	11
Czech Republic Singles Digital (ČNS IFPI)	23
France (SNEP)	13
Germany (GfK)	66
Greece Digital Songs (Billboard)	3
Hungary (Single Top 40)	11
Hungary (Stream Top 40)	38
Israel International Airplay (Media Forest)	3
Italy (FIMI)	13
Netherlands (Dutch Top 40)	16
Netherlands (Single Top 100)	27
Scottish Singles Sales (Official Charts)	50
Slovakia Airplay (ČNS IFPI)	55
Slovenia (SloTop50)	33
Spain (Promusicae)	30
Sweden Heatseeker (Sverigetopplistan)	20
Switzerland (Schweizer Hitparade)	26
UK Singles (Official Charts)	36
US Pop Digital Songs (Billboard)	30

=== Year-end charts ===
Chart (2015)	Position
Belgium (Ultratop Flanders)	30
Belgium (Ultratop Wallonia)	59
France (SNEP)	102
Hungary (Single Top 40)	78
Italy (FIMI)	68
Netherlands (Dutch Top 40)	78
Netherlands (NPO 3FM)	64

== Certifications ==
Region	Certification	Certified units/sales
Belgium (BRMA)	Gold	15,000^{*}
Italy (FIMI)	2× Platinum	100,000^{‡}
Poland (ZPAV)	2× Platinum	40,000^{‡}
New Zealand (RMNZ)	Gold	15,000^{‡}
United Kingdom (BPI)	Silver	200,000^{‡}
^{*} Sales figures based on certification alone.^{‡} Sales+streaming figures based on certification alone.
