= The Amazing Spider-Man 2 (soundtrack) =

2014 soundtrack album by Hans Zimmer

The Amazing Spider-Man 2: The Original Motion Picture Soundtrack

Soundtrack album by Hans Zimmer and The Magnificent Six featuring Pharrell Williams and Johnny Marr
- Released: April 18, 2014
- Recorded: 2013–2014
- Genres: Electropop; dance-pop; indie rock; R&B
- Length: 66:35 (Standard edition); 1:55:19 (Deluxe edition)
- Labels: Columbia; Madison Gate
- Producers: Hans Zimmer, Stephen Lipson, Pharrell Williams

Hans Zimmer chronology
Son of God (2014)	The Amazing Spider-Man 2: The Original Motion Picture Soundtrack (2014)	Interstellar (2014)

Pharrell Williams chronology
Girl (2014)	The Amazing Spider-Man 2: The Original Motion Picture Soundtrack (2014)	Hidden Figures (2016)

Junkie XL chronology
Divergent (2014)	The Amazing Spider-Man 2: The Original Motion Picture Soundtrack (2014)	Run All Night (2015)

Singles from The Amazing Spider-Man 2: The Original Motion Picture Soundtrack
- 1. "It's On Again" Released: March 31, 2014; 2. "The Edge" Released: April 1, 2014

Professional ratings
Review scores
Source	Rating
AllMusic	4/5 stars
Movie Wave	4/5 stars
Filmtracks	1/5 stars
KidzWorld	4/5 stars
Soundtrack Geek	7.8/10

The Amazing Spider-Man 2: The Original Motion Picture Soundtrack is the official soundtrack from the 2014 film of the same name composed and arranged by Hans Zimmer and a supergroup called The Magnificent Six, consisting of Pharrell Williams, Mike Einziger, Junkie XL, Johnny Marr, Andrew Kawczynski, and Steve Mazzaro. It was released on April 18, 2014, through Columbia Records and Madison Gate Records.

== Release and promotion ==
Marc Webb, director of the film, revealed on July 20, 2013, that Zimmer would compose the music for the film, following James Horner, who composed the music for the first film. It was later revealed that they would form a supergroup with Pharrell Williams to compose the film's music. Zimmer revealed the film's main theme on April 4, 2014, saying that the film's score would be different from his previous work.

The soundtrack was released on April 18 in two different versions. The standard version includes a single disc with fourteen tracks of score from the film and six songs by other artists that were both used in and inspired by the film. The deluxe edition features two discs, with the first containing only the score, but with six additional tracks (several score tracks also present in the standard edition are notably longer in the deluxe edition). The second disc includes four bonus score tracks, two of them character suites, as well as all of the non-score songs from the standard version, with two additional songs.

The soundtrack features a song called "It's On Again" performed by Alicia Keys featuring Kendrick Lamar, which plays in the end credits.

Electro's theme is heard for a split second during his introduction in Spider-Man: No Way Home.

== Track listing ==
=== Standard edition ===
Disc 1
No.	Title	Writer(s)	Artist	Length
1.	"I'm Electro"			0:46
2.	"There He Is"			1:53
3.	"I'm Spider-Man"			1:00
4.	"My Enemy"			8:04
5.	"Ground Rules"			1:17
6.	"Look at Me"			3:09
7.	"You Need Me"			3:09
8.	"So Much Anger"			2:09
9.	"I Need to Know"			4:28
10.	"Sum Total"			2:50
11.	"I Chose You"			1:34
12.	"We're Best Friends"			2:16
13.	"Still Crazy"			2:42
14.	"You're That Spider Guy"		Hans Zimmer	4:51
15.	"It's On Again"	Pharrell Williams; Alicia Cook; Hans Zimmer; Kendrick Duckworth	Alicia Keys featuring Kendrick Lamar	3:50
16.	"Song for Zula"	Matthew Houck	Phosphorescent	6:09
17.	"That's My Man"	Williams	LIZ	3:47
18.	"Here"	Williams; Johnny Marr; Zimmer	Pharrell Williams	4:38
19.	"Honest"	Jesse James Rutherford; Zachary Abels; Jeremy Freedman; Michael Margott	The Neighbourhood	3:57
20.	"Electro Remix (remix by Alvin Risk)"	Alvin Risk; Zimmer; Williams; Tom Holkenborg	Alvin Risk and Hans Zimmer	3:27
Total length:				66:35

=== Deluxe edition ===
No.	Title	Length
1.	"I'm Electro"	0:46
2.	"There He Is"	2:54
3.	"I'm Spider-Man"	1:04
4.	"My Enemy"	8:18
5.	"Ground Rules"	1:12
6.	"Look at Me"	3:10
7.	"Special Project"	3:14
8.	"You Need Me"	3:17
9.	"So Much Anger"	2:12
10.	"I'm Moving to England"	1:03
11.	"I'm Goblin"	3:42
12.	"Let Her Go"	0:33
13.	"You're My Boy"	2:57
14.	"I Need to Know"	5:00
15.	"Sum Total"	2:51
16.	"I Chose You"	1:34
17.	"We're Best Friends"	2:17
18.	"Still Crazy"	2:42
19.	"The Rest of My Life"	2:28
20.	"You're That Spider Guy"	5:29
Total length:		56:43

Disc 2
No.	Title	Writer(s)	Artist	Length
1.	"The Electro Suite"			12:36
2.	"Harry's Suite"			10:07
3.	"Cold War"			3:28
4.	"No Place Like Home"			1:53
5.	"It's On Again"	Pharrell Williams; Alicia Keys; Hans Zimmer; Kendrick Lamar	Alicia Keys (featuring Kendrick Lamar)	3:50
6.	"Song for Zula"	Matthew Houck	Phosphorescent	6:09
7.	"That's My Man"	Williams	Liz	3:47
8.	"Here"	Williams; Johnny Marr; Hans Zimmer	Pharrell Williams	4:38
9.	"Honest"	Jesse James Rutherford; Zachary Abels; Jeremy Freedman; Michael Margott	The Neighbourhood	3:57
10.	"Within the Web (First Day Jam)"	Czarina Russell; Johnny Marr; Zimmer; Junkie XL; Williams; Michael Einziger; Ann Marie Simpson	Czarina Russell, Hans Zimmer and The Magnificent Six	4:30
11.	"The Edge"	Jenna McDougall; Whakaio Taahi	Tonight Alive	3:03
12.	"Electro Remix"	Alvin Risk; Zimmer; Williams; Junkie XL	Alvin Risk and Hans Zimmer	3:27
Total length:				58:54

1. Chart positions

Chart (2014)	Peak position
Australian Albums (ARIA)	71
Belgian Albums (Ultratop Flanders)	141
Irish Albums (IRMA)	94
UK Compilation Albums (Official Charts)	37
US Billboard 200	112
US Top Soundtracks (Billboard)	2

== Critical response ==
Reviews of the score were positive. AllMusic gave the score four stars out of five, saying, "the soundtrack for The Amazing Spider-Man 2 echoes the sequel's frenetic, slick, and streamlined action, offering up 14 instrumental pieces and six non-score-related songs that dutifully reflect the measured and meticulous, corporate tie-in sensibilities of the traditional summer blockbuster while still managing to march to the beat of their own very loud drum."

Movie Wave gave the score four stars, writing, "If you'd said to me while I was first listening to The Amazing Spider-Man back in 2012 (and writing about how much I hoped it might mark a return to a more traditional approach in general to these films) that two years later the sequel would come out and be scored by Hans Zimmer with dubstep, I'd probably have punched you in the face (well, if I weren't the world's most mild-mannered individual, anyway). I guess others will feel the same way. But open your mind to it: it's dazzling stuff." However, Filmtracks gave it one star out of five, heavily criticizing Zimmer's approach.

KidzWorld gave it four stars out of five, opining, "The Amazing Spider-Man had a soundtrack jam-packed full of gorgeous symphonic style melodies, so expectations were high for many Marvel fans when it came to the soundtrack for The Amazing Spider-Man 2. Composer Hans Zimmer [has] created an incredibly different musical landscape for the movie, and it is just as surprising and interesting as the first soundtrack." Soundtrack Geeks gave the soundtrack 7 1/2 stars out of ten, saying, "All is not totally new territory for Zimmer. There's strong hints of earlier scores like Inception in cues like 'I Need To Know', but it is Zimmer after all, and rarely do we hear a score from him that's totally void of earlier Zimmerisms. I absolutely love this cue. 'You’re That Spider Guy' must be the ending theme or something because it feels like that kind of cue. It's got a little bit of everything and a new way to do the main Spidey theme."

== Songs not included on the album ==
- "Amazing" – Performed by Francesca Michielin
- "Gone, Gone, Gone" – Performed by Phillip Phillips
- “The Blue Danube” – Composed by Johann Strauss II
- "Pursuit of Happiness (Steve Aoki Remix)" – Performed by Kid Cudi (featuring MGMT)
- "The Writing's on the Wall" – Performed by OK Go
- "Main Hoon" – Performed by Sanam
- "Jeopardy!" – Written by Merv Griffin
