= A Cure for Wellness (soundtrack) =

Film score by Benjamin Wallfisch
- Released: February 17, 2017
- Studio: Abbey Road Studios, London
- Genre: Film score
- Length: 50:00
- Label: Milan Records
- Producer: Benjamin Wallfisch; Gore Verbinski

Benjamin Wallfisch chronology
Hidden Figures (2016)	A Cure for Wellness (2016)	Bitter Harvest (2017)

A Cure for Wellness is a soundtrack album with original music by Benjamin Wallfisch for Gore Verbinski's film of the same name. It was released by Milan Records on February 17, 2017. Wallfisch collaborated with Verbinski to create repeating thematic melodies in a varied score featuring orchestral ensembles, choruses, and electronics. The orchestra and choirs recorded the music at Abbey Road Studios in London.

The last track on the album is a shortened version of the Ramones song "I Wanna be Sedated" arranged for strings by Wallfisch and performed by Mirel Wagner. This was featured in the film's first trailer but doesn't actually appear in the film itself.

== Production ==
The film's soundtrack was already being developed by Wallfisch and Gore Verbinski before the beginning of the film's shooting.

In an interview conducted by Daniel Schweiger of Film Music Magazine, Wallfisch discusses his thoughts on the film and on collaborating with Verbinski. He describes it as "the most extraordinary, visceral, uncompromising, and beautiful movies" he has worked on to date. He further mentions the film being a unique experience in terms of narrative and the central theme, and that it was an "incredible and inspiring journey" that he went on with Verbinski. Production of the score was a yearlong process. It started with a waltz featured in film for the characters to dance to on set. Following that, Wallfisch continued into Verbinski's cutting rooms where they spent 6–7 months on creating the melodic score together. Ideas were shared among all of film's crew members as they worked together closely.

== Release ==
Milan Records released the original soundtrack album worldwide on CD, digital, and 180gram pearlescent white vinyl. A download card for the digital version of the soundtrack is included with the vinyl packaging. The album was available for pre-order on iTunes which provided the immediate download of two tracks including "I Wanna Be Sedated" and "Bicycle". Both of the tracks premiered on BrooklynVegan.

== Reception ==
Jonathan Broxton from Movie Music UK gave a favorable review describing it as, "quite a superb score on all fronts." He continues to describe it as an enjoyable listen for fans of horror/thriller scores that join with the onscreen creepy scenes of the film.

Patrick Phillips of CutPrintFilm describes Wallfisch's score as music that, "shifts and turns and soars with near operatic grace.

== Track listing ==
No.	Title	Length
1.	"Hannah and Volmer"	4:34
2.	"Nobody Ever Leaves"	1:49
3.	"Bicycle"	1:59
4.	"The Rite"	3:42
5.	"Feuerwalzer"	3:44
6.	"Magnificent, Isn't It"	2:11
7.	"Actually I'm Feeling Much Better"	1:59
8.	"Clearly He's Lost His Mind"	2:49
9.	"Our Thoughts Exactly"	1:03
10.	"Volmer Institut"	3:02
11.	"Terrible Darkness"	3:18
12.	"Lipstick"	4:21
13.	"Waiting"	0:55
14.	"Zutritt Verboten"	3:38
15.	"There's Nothing Wrong With You People"	1:25
16.	"Lockhart's Letter"	2:12
17.	"Volmer's Lab"	3:32
18.	"I Wanna Be Sedated" performed by Mirel Wagner	3:38
Total length:		49:53
