= Dunkirk (soundtrack) =

2017 soundtrack album by Hans Zimmer

Dunkirk (Original Motion Picture Soundtrack)

Soundtrack album by Hans Zimmer
- Released: 21 July 2017
- Recorded: 2016–2017
- Venue: London
- Studios: Abbey Road Studios; AIR Lyndhurst Hall
- Genre: Film score
- Length: 59:46
- Label: WaterTower Music
- Producers: Hans Zimmer; Benjamin Wallfisch; Lorne Balfe; Andrew Kawczynski; Steve Mazzaro

Hans Zimmer chronology
The Boss Baby (2017)	Dunkirk (Original Motion Picture Soundtrack) (2017)	Blade Runner 2049 – Original Motion Picture Soundtrack (2017)

Dunkirk (Original Motion Picture Soundtrack) is the soundtrack to the 2017 film of the same name directed by Christopher Nolan, released under WaterTower Music on 21 July 2017, the same day as the film's theatrical release. The score was composed and arranged by Hans Zimmer, who collaborated with Lorne Balfe, Andrew Kawczynski, Steve Mazzaro, and Benjamin Wallfisch to provide additional music. It was recorded at a 11-month period during early-2016 and several instrumentation and sounds were modified to create intensity in the score. Nolan and Zimmer wanted to create suspense through cinematography and music, hence Zimmer had written several tracks to accommodate the auditory Shepard tone illusion, a feature that has been explored in Nolan's previous films.

The score received critical acclaim, praising Zimmer for the unique composition and the Shepard scale, being pitched in the film, highlighting a "haunting experience of the film that creates a suspense". Several critics analysed the soundscape of the film, and the instrumentation and sound design, praising Nolan and Zimmer for creating a "haunting score" different to previous war film scores. Zimmer received a nomination each at the Academy Award, BAFTA, Golden Globe and Grammy awards for Original Score, though he did not receive a win. Some critics, highlighted it as "one of Zimmer's best score".

== Background ==
Nolan's frequent collaborator Hans Zimmer began working on the score in January 2016, which was continued for eleven months, and eventually created a 100-minute demo. Zimmer recalled the composition of Dunkirk as the "hardest" and "challenging", as the demo-score was "constantly rising" which cannot be altered and edited, Zimmer had to rework the music to set with the film's theme. Nolan assisted Zimmer on the composition of the score and closely assisted with the music supervision, which the latter had said in an interview to Deadline Hollywood, saying "The only way I can talk about the score is to talk about the images and Chris' intellect, and the daring he had in taking something like this and not just making an experimental movie but actually turning it into a successful experimental movie, that people actually wanted to go and see."

For intensity, the script was written to accommodate the auditory illusion of a Shepard tone, (Note: Named after the American scientist Roger Shepard, the sound is created by stacking sine waves that are an octave apart and moving the bass note upward or downward. The result is a sonic loop that appears to rise or fall in pitch, which might not eventually happen. Listening to the score for infinite times, might trigger health issues, such as headache and nausea.) which had previously been explored in The Prestige (2006). This was coupled with the sound of Nolan's own pocket watch, which he recorded and sent to Zimmer to be synthesised. Calling about the Shepard tone, Zimmer said that "It's the idea of eternity and endlessness. It's the idea of playing a trick on time itself" referencing Nolan's previous films. Multiple sessions were created, as some of the score cues created with expensive instrumentation and a large-orchestral pieces were disregarded as "they did not fit well in the film". A minimal string quartet was used for creating the score, with Zimmer's regular players working on the score in "quite and feeble moments" as Zimmer said "There was tension in not making a loud noise. There's tension in the endlessness of a note that just bends and slithers around, and you never know when it's going to strike."

"Nimrod" from Edward Elgar's Enigma Variations is part of the theme, which was slowed down to six beats per minute with added bass notes to avoid it sounding sentimental. Instrumentation included a double bass and fourteen cellos played in high register. Sound designer and audiographer Richard King relayed to Zimmer the sound of a boat engine, which served as a reference for the tempo. Wanting the "audience to feel uncomfortable", King wanted the practical sounds in the picture to provide the texture — the dive bombers, sinking ships, explosions, and the ticking clock. He wanted the music to provide the driving force. The sounds would be what the characters are hearing. The music would be what the audience hears." Zimmer visited the Dunkirk set for inspiration, taking back a jar of sand, and chose not to view raw footage whilst composing. Nolan liked the idea for creating the score cue with a jar of sand, as it is based on a "mathematical idea". The music was recorded at Abbey Road Studios and AIR Lyndhurst Hall with mix engineer Geoff Foster. The original score was applied, only after the final cut was ready.

== Release ==
On 16 June 2017, WaterTower Music announced a press release, stating that the original score will be released on the day of the film's theatrical release (21 July) in digital and physical formats, and the official soundtrack listing was revealed on the same day. On 30 June, the first of the original soundtrack titled "Supermarine" was revealed to the public. Adam Chitwood of Collider said "The main thing that's clear from this track is that Zimmer is drawing heavily on diegetic noises and sounds inherent to what's going on in the story—one listens to this track and hears the unmistakable sound of a plane propeller, gun fire, and sirens, albeit all twisted in a very Hans Zimmer way." A limited pressing of 4,000 copies of a special edition 2-disc vinyl set soundtrack was released on 13 October 2017.

== Reception ==
=== Critical response ===
Critical review, written for ,,Consequence,,, and published by Blake Goble, gave a verdict saying "The repetitive work of Hans Zimmer and his repository of talented composers and influences makes music that sticks with you, long after the battle's done." Jonathan Broxton of Movie Music UK recalled "Christopher Nolan is certainly not the only respected director to have this view, but his position is such that his stylistic choices influence others, Zimmer's responses to those choices influence dozens of other composers in the Hollywood film music world, and the cycle continues." MFiles published a review about the soundtrack saying "The Dunkirk score is one of those classic cases that throws film soundtrack reviewers into a quandary as to what matters most: the music's application in the film itself, or as a standalone listen away from it? [...] When the score is heard in conjunction with the sound effects one experiences nothing less than an astonishing wall of noise, an extremely effective approach that has the audience cowering and flinching. Taken on these terms, the music is triumphant. Technically accomplished as it is, it hardly makes for a casual listen," and concluded, "Zimmer and Nolan have always made for intriguing if controversial collaborators and Dunkirk is another signature work that will surely do more to extend the debate about the role of film music in contemporary cinema." Filmtracks.com wrote "the Zimmer horde's music is best when it's absent, and on album, it's best when it has concluded".

=== Analysis ===
Several critics analysed Zimmer's use of the innovations in creating the score, including Shepard tone. Writing for The New Yorker magazine, Anthony Lane analysed about the score apart from Elgar Variation 15, "the rest of the score is more attuned to the film's suspense" where "the strings unleash a machine-gun stutter, and a ticking sound suggests not a clock but a countdown to detonation". In a 5-star review for The Guardian, Peter Bradshaw described the score as "one of Zimmer's best" and added "an eerie, keening, groaning accompaniment to a nightmare, switching finally to quasi-Elgar variations for the deliverance itself." He added "Zimmer creates a continuous pantonal lament, which imitates the dive bomber scream and queasy turning of the tides, and it works in counterpoint to the deafening artillery and machine-gun fire that pretty much took the fillings out of my teeth and sent them in a shrapnel fusillade all over the cinema auditorium."

Ed Newton-Rex stated about the use of Shepard tone in this film, along with Nolan's previous films, including The Prestige (2006), The Dark Knight (2008), Inception (2010) and Interstellar (2014). He added that "the rising diminished scale is used in various places throughout the score, and adds to the rising intensity of the film even before it's stacked on top of itself and turned into a Shepard scale". While further explaining about the rich musical diversity, between Nolan and Zimmer, Rex stated "The music, then, is far more intricately bound up with the narrative than you initially thought, or than any regular composer would settle for." The connection between time and sound, were also elaborated with references to the three soldiers and timelines, running towards the same point, hence "three Shepard scales" are being created for the situation.

Justine Conry of Shenandoah Film Collaborative said that Dunkirk has an "anxiety-inducing score" rather than the emotional, incredible, dramatic and heroic scores, with the use of Shepard tone. He wrote: "Zimmer, to a greater effect, uses the sound of ticking clocks for the “Shepherd tone.” The ticks, at points, could possibly mirror the heartbeat of the soldiers as they encounter different situations. However, the speed of the ticks vary based on the different point of view: The Land is slower, The Sea is a little faster, The Air is the fastest. As the film switches between these three views, the ticks get faster or slower, not allowing the audience to take a breath and give themselves the time to make this narrative switch. It further underlines the fear that the soldiers have, their desperate attempts for survival [...] The use of time and sound within the film work almost seamlessly with each other to create an experience for the audience, especially when viewed in a movie theatre."

== Track listing ==
Dunkirk (Original Motion Picture Soundtrack)
No.	Title	Writer(s)	Length
1.	"The Mole"	Hans Zimmer	5:36
2.	"We Need Our Army Back"	Zimmer	6:28
3.	"Shivering Soldier"	Zimmer	2:52
4.	"Supermarine"	Zimmer	8:03
5.	"The Tide"	Zimmer	3:49
6.	"Regimental Brothers"	Zimmer; Lorne Balfe	5:04
7.	"Impulse"	Zimmer	2:37
8.	"Home"	Zimmer; Benjamin Wallfisch	6:02
9.	"The Oil"	Zimmer	6:11
10.	"Variation 15 (Dunkirk)"	Wallfisch; Sir Edward Elgar	5:52
11.	"End Titles"	Wallfisch; Elgar; Balfe; Zimmer	7:13
Total length:			59:46

== Accolades ==
Zimmer received several nominations, including the Academy Award for Best Original Score, BAFTA Award for Best Original Music, Golden Globe Award for Best Original Score, Grammy Award for Best Score Soundtrack for Visual Media and Critics' Choice Movie Award for Best Score. He was placed at 2nd position on Best Musical Score award at the Dallas–Fort Worth Film Critics Association Awards 2017 and was a runner-up at the Florida Film Critics Circle Awards 2017 for Best Score nomination.
