= The Boss Baby (soundtrack) =

2017 soundtrack album

The Boss Baby (Music from the Motion Picture)

Soundtrack album by Hans Zimmer and Steve Mazzaro
- Released: March 24, 2017
- Recorded: 2016–2017
- Studios: AIR Studios, London; Remote Control Productions, Santa Monica, California; Groove Masters, Santa Monica, California
- Genres: Film soundtrack; film score
- Length: 66:11
- Label: Back Lot Music
- Producers: Hans Zimmer; Steve Mazzaro

Hans Zimmer chronology
Hidden Figures (2016)	The Boss Baby (2017)	Dunkirk (2017)

Steve Mazzaro chronology
The Boss Baby (2017)	Icebox (2018)

The Boss Baby (Music from the Motion Picture) is the soundtrack album composed by Hans Zimmer and Steve Mazzaro for the film of the same name and released by Back Lot Music on March 24, 2017.

== Development ==
Frequent DreamWorks collaborator Hans Zimmer composed the score for The Boss Baby. He would associate with his protege Steve Mazzaro as a co-composer, and also in his film scoring debut; Mazzaro worked at Zimmer's Remote Control Productions assisting the composer as well as providing additional music. Zimmer was inspired by the piece "Romantic Number two" by Howard Hanson, which McGrath added that a lot of imagery was derived from this music. Eventually, Zimmer composed the themes for Tim, the baby, a bonding theme that served as a combination of the two themes. McGrath considered Zimmer to be another character, because of his involvement on combining themes to provide an emotional theme together, and how he provides large themes derived from the big tunes because of the instrumentation and orchestration. Citing the climatic sequence, McGrath added that the orchestra was moved by it because of the rarity to play old school Hollywood score and the emotional connect that followed with it. He further complimented Zimmer for not making a manipulative music but focused more on underscoring the story for geniune emotion.

== Release ==
The soundtrack was released through Back Lot Music (Note: In 2016, NBCUniversal acquired DreamWorks Animation which resulted in two of the film scores for The Boss Baby and Captain Underpants: The First Epic Movie released through Back Lot Music, which was a division of Universal Filmed Entertainment Group; however, both the films were still distributed by 20th Century Fox which had the rights until 2017.) on March 24, 2017, a week ahead of the film's release.

== Reception ==
Jonathan Broxton of Movie Music UK said, "[the] stylistic inconsistency and tendency to jump all over the place may drive some listeners bonkers, but as an accompaniment to a movie of this type, it fits the bill perfectly". Filmtracks wrote "All of the music is recorded beautifully, with crisp and deep presentations of especially the orchestral players throughout. But don't expect this music to compete with Megamind or the Kung Fu Panda scores by most measures. Seek the one lovely and lengthy [Conrad] Pope cue and leave the rest of the score to howling dogs.." Michael Rechtshaffen of The Hollywood Reporter said, "the nostalgic underpinnings are also nicely incorporated into the appropriately bubbly score by Hans Zimmer and frequent collaborator Steve Mazzaro". Hannah Woodhead of HeyUGuys wrote "Hans Zimmer’s score is (as always) pitch-perfect, particularly in the film’s closing scene".

== Track listing ==
No.	Title	Artist(s)	Length
1.	"Survival of the Fittest"		2:24
2.	"Baby Brother"		3:58
3.	"Welcome To Baby Corp"		3:12
4.	"You Can't Get Away From Johnny Law"		2:11
5.	"We Can Buy a Bouncy House"		3:18
6.	"Super Colossal Big Fat Boss Baby"		1:11
7.	"Barfmitzvah"		2:11
8.	"Toodaloo Toilet-Head!"		4:02
9.	"I Wish You Were Never Born"		2:53
10.	"Puppy Co"		3:27
11.	"You Want To Hug Me, Don't You?"		3:20
12.	"Arrrggh"		2:01
13.	"Francis Francis"		4:19
14.	"You're Fired"		4:28
15.	"Upsies! I Need Upsies!"		1:44
16.	"Love"		5:17
17.	"Go Get Yourself a Horse"		2:19
18.	"What the World Needs Now Is Love"	Missi Hale	4:15
19.	"Cheek to Cheek" (From the Motion Picture Top Hat)	Fred Astaire	5:01
20.	"(Every Time I Turn Around) Back in Love Again"	L.T.D.	4:40
Total length:			66:11

== Personnel ==
Credits adapted from liner notes:

Production

- Music composer and producer – Hans Zimmer, Steve Mazzaro
- Additional music – Conrad Pope
- Sampling team – Drew Jordan, Raul Vega, Taurees Habib
- Digital instrument design – Mark Wherry
- Score overdub recording – Rupert Coulson
- Score overdub supervision – Matt Dunkley
- Score overdub assistance – Alfredo Pasquel, Kevin Smith
- Score wrangler – Bob Badami
- Technical engineer – Stephanie McNally
- Assistant technical engineer – Alex Ferguson, John Prestage, Tom Leach
- Recording – Geoff Foster
- Additional recording – Nathaniel Kunkel, Seth Waldmann
- Digital score recordists – Laurence Anslow, Tom Bailey
- Mixing and mastering – Nathaniel Kunkel
- Mixing assistance – Alfredo Pasquel
- Music editor – Shannon Erbe
- Score editor – Adam Miller
- Musical assistance – Cynthia Park
- Technical assistance – Derrick Werlé
- Score technical consultant – Chuck Choi
- Music consultant – Peter Asher
- Score production supervisor – Charlene Ann Huang
- Music production services – Steven Kofsky
- Studio manager – Alison Burton, Eric Lynn, Shalini Singh
- Music coordinator – Sebastien Christie
- Music librarian – Global Music Services
- Copyist – Jill Streater, Ann Barnard
- Package design – Brian Porizek

Orchestra

- Orchestrator – Joan Martorell, Òscar Senén
- Orchestra leader – Perry Montague-Mason, Emlyn Singleton
- Orchestra conductor – Gavin Greenaway
- Orchestra contractor – Isobel Griffiths
- Assistant orchestra contractor – Lucy Whalley

Instrumentalists

- Alto flute – Nina Robertson
- Alto saxophone – Howard McGill, Phil Todd
- Baritone Saxophone – Dave Bishop, Phil Todd
- Bass – Allen Walley, Andy Marshall, Andy Pask, Ben Russell, Mary Scully (principal), Paul Kimber, Richard Pryce, Roger Linley, Steve Williams, Steve Mair
- Bass clarinet, contrabass – Dave Fuest
- Bass trombone – Dave Stewart, Dave Vines, Ed Tarrant, Roger Argente
- Bassoon – Rachel Simms, Sarah Burnett, Stephen Maw
- Cello – Bozidar Vukotic, Caroline Dale (principal), Caroline Dearnley, Chris Worsey, Dave Daniels, Ian Burdge, John Heley, Jonathan Tunnell, Jonathan Williams, Paul Kegg, Sophie Harris, Tim Lowe, Tim Gill, Tina Guo, Tony Lewis, Tony Woollard, Vicky Matthews, Will Schofield
- Clarinet – Dave Fuest, Nicholas Bucknall, Paul Richards
- Contrabassoon – Rachel Simms
- Cor anglais – Jane Marshall
- Double bass – Andy Pask
- Electric bass guitar – Yolanda Charles
- Flute – Anna Noakes, Helen Keen, Karen Jones, Nina Robertson
- French horn – Corrine Bailey, Hugh Sisley, John Thurgood, Martin Owen, Michael Thompson, Phil Woods, Philip Eastop, Richard Berry, Richard Watkins
- Funk brass – Andy Wood, Alistair White, Trevor Mires, Mike Lovatt, Tom Rees-Roberts, Tom Walsh
- Guitar – Guthrie Govan
- Harmonica – Philip Achille
- Harp – Camilla Pay, Skaila Kanga
- Oboe – Gareth Hulse, Jane Marshall, Janey Miller
- Oboe d'amore – Gareth Hulse
- Percussion – Frank Ricotti, Gary Kettel, Paul Clarvis, Satnam S. Ramgotra, Sheila E.
- Piano, celesta – Simon Chamberlain
- Piccolo clarinet – Nicholas Bucknall
- Piccolo flute – Helen Keen, Nina Robertson
- Saxophone – Phil Todd
- Tenor saxophone – Adrian Revell, Phil Todd, Stan Sulzmann
- Tenor trombone – Amos Miller, Andy Wood, Ed Tarrant, Mark Nightingale, Richard Edwards
- Timpani – Bill Lockhart
- Trumpet – Alistair Mackie, Jason Evans, Kate Moore, Paul Mayes, Phil Cobb
- Tuba – Owen Slade, Pete Smith
- Viola – Edward Vanderspar, Gillianne Haddow, Helen Kamminga, Julia Knight, Kate Musker, Martin Humbey, Paul Cassidy, Peter Lale (principal), Rachel Bolt, Rachel Roberts, Rebecca Carrington, Reiad Chibah, Richard Cookson, Sue Dench
- Violin – Alison Kelly, Ben Hancox, Boguslaw Kostecki, Cathy Thompson, Christina Emanuel, Clio Gould, Dai Emanuel, Daniel Bhattacharya, Debbie Preece, Liz Edwards, Emil Chakalov, Everton Nelson, Gaby Lester, Ian Humphries, Jackie Shave, Jackie Hartley, John Bradbury, Jonathan Evans-Jones, Julian Leaper, Julian Tear, Magnus Johnston, Manon Derome, Mark Berrow, Oli Langford, Patrick Kiernan, Pauline Lowbury, Peter Hanson, Richard George, Roger Garland, Simon Baggs, Sonia Slany, Sue Briscoe, Tom Pigott-Smith

Choir

- Choir – London Voices
- Choirmaster – Ben Parry, Terry Edwards
- Choir conductor – Ben Parry
- Jazz choir – Metro Voices
- Jazz choirmaster – Jenny O'Grady
- Jazz choir conductor – Matt Dunkley
- Gospel choir – London Gospel Choir
- Gospel choir contractor – Edie Lehmann Boddicker

Vocalists

- Alto vocals – Amy Blythe, Catherine Backhouse, Clara Sanabras, Clemmie Franks, Freya Jacklin, Hannah Cooke, Helen Brookes, Jo Marshall, Judy Rees, Lucy Potterton, Melanie Sanders, Vanessa Heine
- Bass vocals – Ben Bevan, Christopher Jay Neale, Edward Grint, John Evanson, Mark Williams, Michael Dore, Neli Bellingham, Nicholas Ashby, Nicholas Garrett, Nigel Short, Oliver Hunt, Tobias Hug
- Soprano vocals – Alison Hill, Ann De Renais, Christina Sampson, Dani May, Jacqueline Barron, Joanna Goldsmith, Katy Hill, Elizabeth Swain, Mary Carewe, Natalie Clifton Griffith, Philippa Murray, Sarah Eyden
- Tenor vocals – Benedict Hymas, Gareth Treseder, Garth Bardsley, Gerald O'Beirne, Harvey Brough, Henry Moss, Julian Alexander Smith, Matthew Long, Nicholas Hurndall Smith, Oliver Griffiths, Richard Edgar Wilson, Richard Eteson
- Gospel choir vocalists – Briana Lee, Carmen Carter, Clydene Jackson, Denise Carite, Edie Lehmann Boddicker, Missi Hale, Navanna Holley, Tiffany Palmer, Toni Scruggs
- Jazz choir vocalists – C J Neale, Heather Cairncross, Joanna Forbes, Michael Dore, Nick Garrett, Oliver Griffiths, Rachel Weston, Sarah Eyden

Management

- Business affairs for Back Lot Music – Tanya Perara
- Music business affairs – Emily Morchower, Kevin Breen, Philip Cohen
- Music clearances – Julie Butchko
- Executive in charge of Back Lot Music – Mike Knobloch
- Executive in charge of music for DreamWorks Animation – Sunny Park
- Music manager – Tori Fillat
- Marketing manager for Back Lot Music – Nikki Walsh
- Production director for Back Lot Music – Jake Voulgarides

== Accolades ==
Award	Date of ceremony	Category	Recipient(s)	Result	Ref.
Hollywood Music in Media Awards	November 17, 2017	Best Original Score in an Animated Film	Hans Zimmer and Steve Mazzaro	Nominated	
