= What Are You So Scared Of? =

Studio album by Tonight Alive
- Released: 14 October 2011
- Studio: NRG, Music Friends
- Genre: Pop-punk; emo pop
- Length: 43:51
- Label: Fearless; Sony Music
- Producer: Mark Trombino

Tonight Alive chronology
Consider This (2010)	What Are You So Scared Of? (2011)	The Other Side (2013)

Professional ratings
Review scores
Source	Rating
AbsolutePunk	70%
Punknews.org	2.5/5 stars

What Are You So Scared Of? is the debut studio album by the Australian rock band Tonight Alive, released on 14 October 2011 through Sony Music Australia. The standard CD version of What Are You So Scared Of? contains 10 pre-gap hidden acoustic takes of the album. Let It Land EP was released to accompany it; it shares the track "Let It Land", and also contains a new song and the three acoustic versions which were unable to fit on the album. Tonight Alive traveled to Los Angeles to record the album with producer Mark Trombino (Blink-182, Jimmy Eat World, Midtown). As the follow-up to 2010's Consider This EP, What Are You So Scared Of? debuted on the Australian albums chart at No. 15.

== Production ==
What Are You So Scared Of? was recorded at NRG Studios in Hollywood, California, and Music Friends Studios, in Los Angeles, California, in January 2011. Mark Trombino produced the sessions with engineer Josh Newell. Mark Maxwell did additional production on "Starlight" and "Let It Land", while Mike Green did the same for "Sure as Hell". Tombino mixed the recordings, and then they were mastered by John Davis at Metropolis in London.

== Release ==
The record's first single, "Starlight", was released 1 July. Its second, "Let It Land", was released 19 September. On 11 October, "Thank You and Goodnight" was made available for streaming. On 4 November the group announced they had signed a North American deal with independent label Fearless Records and were planning on releasing their album in that territory in early 2012. In November and December, the group supported Blessthefall on the Fearless Friends Tour in the US. What Are You So Scared Of? was released in the US on 14 February 2012. Deluxe edition included three tracks: "You Know Me", "Welcome" and "Take Me Down". Upon its US release, it debuted at No. 7 on the US Heatseekers Albums chart, No. 48 on US Rock Albums and No. 32 on Independent Albums. While the group was planning to support Go Radio on their headlining spring tour in the US, they had to drop of due to McDougall having an eczema outbreak. On 12 October a music video was released for "Listening". A behind-the-scenes video was also released. In October and November, the band supported Pierce the Veil on their Collide with the Sky Tour in the US.

== Track listing ==
All tracks written by Tonight Alive, except where noted.

Australian release
No.	Title	Writer(s)	Length
1.	"Eject, Eject, Eject!"		1:29
2.	"Breaking & Entering"		3:32
3.	"Starlight"	Tonight Alive, Mark Maxwell	3:23
4.	"Sure as Hell"	Tonight Alive, Mike Green	3:06
5.	"Let It Land"	Tonight Alive, Maxwell	3:34
6.	"Fake It"		3:16
7.	"Listening"		2:55
8.	"Reason to Sing"		2:55
9.	"Safe & Sound"		3:17
10.	"Thank You & Goodnight" (featuring Mark Hoppus)		3:04
11.	"Amelia"		3:38
12.	"In the First Place"		2:41
13.	"To Die For"		3:25
14.	"What Are You So Scared Of?"		3:36
Total length:			43:51

Acoustic pre-gap hidden tracks
No.	Title	Length
1.	"Breaking and Entering" (acoustic)	3:26
2.	"Starlight" (acoustic)	3:07
3.	"Sure as Hell" (acoustic)	2:58
4.	"Let It Land" (acoustic)	3:24
5.	"Safe and Sound" (acoustic)	3:06
6.	"Thank You & Goodnight" (acoustic)	3:00
7.	"Amelia" (acoustic)	3:36
8.	"In the First Place" (acoustic)	2:33
9.	"To Die For" (acoustic)	3:16
10.	"What Are You So Scared Of?" (acoustic)	2:51
Total length:		1:15:12

- The Australian iTunes edition contains the bonus track "Welcome", three music videos and two behind-the-scenes videos.

US release
No.	Title	Length
1.	"Eject, Eject, Eject!"	1:29
2.	"Breaking & Entering"	3:32
3.	"Sure as Hell"	3:06
4.	"Starlight"	3:23
5.	"To Die For"	3:25
6.	"Let It Land"	3:24
7.	"Amelia"	3:38
8.	"Listening"	2:55
9.	"Thank You & Goodnight" (featuring Mark Hoppus)	3:04
10.	"Safe and Sound"	3:17
11.	"Fake It"	3:16
12.	"What Are You So Scared Of?"	3:36
Total length:		39:08

iTunes deluxe edition bonus tracks
No.	Title	Length
13.	"Welcome"	2:50
14.	"Take Me Down"	2:36
15.	"Breaking & Entering" (music video)	3:28
16.	"Starlight" (music video)	3:26
Total length:		51:45

== Let It Land ==
The Let It Land EP is the accompanying disc to What Are You So Scared Of?, available on CD. What Are You So Scared Of? features 10 pre-gap hidden acoustic tracks in addition to the 14-track album; the additional acoustic tracks that were unable to fit on the album make up the majority of Let It Land. Also included on the EP is a new song, "Welcome".

1. "Let It Land"
2. "Welcome"
3. "Fake It" (acoustic)
4. "Listening" (acoustic)
5. "Reason to Sing" (acoustic)

== Personnel ==
Personnel per booklet.

Tonight Alive

- Jenna McDougall – lead vocals
- Whakaio Taahi – guitar, backing vocals
- Jake Hardy – guitar
- Cam Adler – bass guitar, backing vocals
- Matty Best – drums

Production and design

- Mark Hoppus — vocals on Thank You And Goodnight
- Mark Trombino – producer, engineer, mixing
- Josh Newell – engineer
- John Lavis – mastering
- Mark Maxwell – additional production (tracks 3 and 5)
- Mike Green – additional production (track 4)
- Josh Mann – graphic design, layout
- John Engelhardt – cover illustration
- Elliot Toms – band pic

== Charts ==
Chart performance
Chart (2011–2012)	Peak position
Australian Albums (ARIA)	15
UK Albums (OCC)	172
UK Rock & Metal Albums (OCC)	17
US Heatseekers Albums (Billboard)	7
US Independent Albums (Billboard)	32
US Top Current Album Sales (Billboard)	180
US Top Rock Albums (Billboard)	48
