= Limitless (Tonight Alive album) =

Studio album by Tonight Alive
- Released: 4 March 2016
- Recorded: March–July 2015
- Genre: Pop rock; alternative rock
- Length: 38:20
- Label: Fearless; Sony Music; Easy Life
- Producer: David Bendeth

Tonight Alive chronology
The Other Side (2013)	Limitless (2016)	Underworld (2018)

Singles from Limitless
- 1. "Human Interaction" Released: 30 October 2015; 2. "To Be Free" Released: 21 November 2015; 3. "Drive" Released: 11 December 2015; 4. "How Does It Feel?" Released: 10 January 2016

Limitless is the third studio album by the Australian rock band Tonight Alive, released on 4 March 2016 through Sony Music Australia in Oceania and Japan, Fearless Records in North America and Easy Life Records in Europe.

== Background ==
Production on the album began in March 2015 with producer David Bendeth. In April and May, the group supported All Time Low on their headlining US tour. On 3 July, it was announced that they had finished recording, and that the album was expected for release later in the year.

== Musical style ==
According to professional music reviews, Limitless is a departure from Tonight's Alive's previous pop punk sound, being described as pop rock by Blunt Magazine and Beat.com.au, as well as alternative rock by Pure Grain Audio.

== Release ==
In late October, the group teased something that would be coming at the end of the month. On 29 October, Limitless was announced for release in March 2016. In addition, a music video was released for "Human Interaction". On 11 December, "Drive" was made available for streaming. On 11 January, "How Does It Feel?" was made available for streaming. On 27 January, a music video was released for "Drive".

In February, the group went on a European tour, followed by a UK tour with support from Our Last Night and Milk Teeth. Limitless was released on 4 March through Fearless Records. Following this, the group embarked on a co-headlining US tour with Set It Off, dubbed The Fight for Something Tour. They were supported by The Ready Set and SayWeCanFly. During the tour, the band performed at Self Help Fest. The band played two shows in Japan in April. In November and December, the group supported Sleeping with Sirens in the US, before supporting A Day to Remember in Australia.

== Reception ==
Professional ratings
Aggregate scores
Source	Rating
Metacritic	67/100
Review scores
Source	Rating
AllMusic	3.5/5 stars
DIY	3/5 stars
MOSH (Hit the Floor Magazine)	6/10
Rock Sound	6/10
Rolling Stone Australia	2/5 stars
Upset Magazine	4/5 stars

The album has received mixed to positive reviews from critics. The band's maturing sound and Jenna McDougall's lyrics have been cited as the record's high points. In a very positive review, Jade Falconer for Musicology wrote, "With their last album being so dark, the more upbeat sound of Limitless could prove to show some positivity in the Tonight Alive camp. The growth and variety of sound they have shown on this album is a clear sign this band has so much more to give and their journey is truly just beginning."

Stephen Ackroyd also gave a more positive review of the album, saying "In breaking their mold - and that of everyone around them - Tonight Alive are being braver than their peers. While they could have moved with the pack and picked up the casual plaudits that come to any band growing their fanbase record by record, they've done what any artist should; been true to themselves."

In contrast, in a very critical review for Clash, Lisa Henderson called the album "an overly ambitious re-invention". Of the lyrics, she judged that the combination of McDougall's sorrowful lyrics and the erratic melodies results in a "distasteful musical theatre sound" and that "the blunder is only worsened by her bizarrely melodramatic vocals".

In a mixed review for DIY, Sarah Jamieson wrote, "When it comes to their latest musical offering, Tonight Alive are being fairly upfront with its sentiments." She also felt that while at times the band's ambitions pay off (in tracks "How Does It Feel?" and "Everywhere"), the album "at times feels a little overwrought, a little too cheesy, with some of Jenna McDougall's lyrics sounding less comfortable than you might expect." She concluded her review with "There's no doubting that Tonight Alive are being brave with their attempts on this new record, but they haven't quite hit the perfect balance between their past and future."

== Track listing ==
No.	Title	Writer(s)	Length
1.	"To Be Free"	Jenna McDougall; Whakaio Taahi	3:27
2.	"Oxygen"	McDougall; Taahi	3:33
3.	"Human Interaction"	McDougall; Taahi; David Hodges	3:36
4.	"Drive"	McDougall; Taahi; Anthony Egizii; David Musumeci	3:16
5.	"How Does It Feel?"	McDougall; Taahi; Hodges; Cameron Walker	3:29
6.	"Waves"	McDougall; Taahi; Bendeth; Scott Christopher Stevens	3:38
7.	"Everywhere"	McDougall; Taahi; Bob Marlette	3:05
8.	"Power of One"	McDougall; Taahi; Hodges; Ben Moody; Steve Solomon	2:59
9.	"I Defy"	McDougall; Taahi; Hodges; Solomon	3:34
10.	"We Are"	McDougall; Taahi	3:59
11.	"The Greatest"	McDougall; Taahi	3:51

Japanese bonus tracks
No.	Title	Writer(s)	Length
12.	"Drive" (acoustic)	McDougall; Taahi; Egizii; Musumeci	3:09
13.	"Oxygen" (acoustic)	McDougall; Taahi	3:39

== Personnel ==
Tonight Alive

- Jenna McDougall – lead vocals, keyboards
- Whakaio Taahi – lead guitar
- Jake Hardy – rhythm guitar
- Cam Adler – bass
- Matty Best – drums, percussion

Additional musicians

- David Hodges – piano on "Human Interaction" and "How Does It Feel?"
- Douglas Allen – keyboards, programming, effects, string arrangements
- Steve Solomon – keyboards, programming
- Brian Robbins – programming
- Greg Johnson – effects
- Koby Nelson – background vocals

Production

- David Bendeth – production, mixing, arranger
- Tonight Alive – arrangements
- Jenna McDougall – art direction
- Mitch Milan – digital editing, engineer, guitar technician
- Koby Nelson – digital editing, engineer
- Brian Robbins – digital editing, engineer, mixing engineer, spiritual advisor
- Steve Sarkissian – drum technician
- Ted Jensen – mastering
- Thomas Russell – cover art
- Mitch Storck – artwork, layout
- Jordan Knight – photography
- Matty Vogel – photography

== Charts ==
Chart performance
Chart (2016)	Peak position
Australian Albums (ARIA)	6
Scottish Albums (OCC)	27
UK Albums (OCC)	37
UK Rock & Metal Albums (OCC)	1
US Independent Albums (Billboard)	12
US Top Album Sales (Billboard)	88
US Top Alternative Albums (Billboard)	20
US Top Rock Albums (Billboard)	23
