= Despicable Me 3 (soundtrack) =

2017 soundtrack album

Despicable Me 3: Original Motion Picture Soundtrack

Soundtrack album by Various Artists
- Released: June 23, 2017
- Studios: Various: Chalice Recording Studios; Glenwood Place Studios; Conway Recording Studios; South Beach Studios; Metropolis Studios; Art and Music Studios; The Hit Factory; The Majestic Hotel; Remote Control Productions; Record Plant; The Eastwood Scoring Stage
- Genres: Pop; hip-hop; R&B; funk; soul; classical
- Length: 51:14
- Labels: I Am Other; Columbia
- Producers: Various: Alan Tarney; Andrew Coleman; Hart Gunther; Heitor Pereira; Madonna; Manne Praeker; Marvin dM. Nitazal; Michael Jackson; Mike Larson; Pharrell Williams; Quincy Jones; Reinhold Heil; Rick Bryant; Stephen Bray; Toto Gamyar

Pharrell Williams chronology
Hidden Figures (2017)	Despicable Me 3 (2017)	Piece by Piece (Original Motion Picture Soundtrack) (2024)

Singles from Despicable Me 3: Original Motion Picture Soundtrack
- 1. "Yellow Light" Released: June 8, 2017; 2. "There's Something Special" Released: June 13, 2017

Despicable Me 3 (Original Motion Picture Soundtrack) is the soundtrack album to the 2017 film Despicable Me 3, the fourth installment in the Despicable Me franchise and the sequel to Despicable Me 2 (2013). Pharrell Williams produced the soundtrack album, and also contributed five original songs for the film. The other tracks consisted of several pop singles from the 1980s performed by Michael Jackson, Madonna, Nena, A-ha and few songs and themes from the previous installments. The soundtrack for Despicable Me 3 was released on June 23, 2017, featuring sixteen tracks, and was led by two singles – "Yellow Light" and "There's Something Special" – which was made available through digital download and streaming on June 8 and 13, prior to the album release. Heitor Pereira, who worked on the previous installments, had composed the film's music. Despicable Me 3 (Original Motion Picture Score), which featured Pereira's original score of 38 tracks, was released by Back Lot Music on June 30.

== Despicable Me 3 (Original Motion Picture Soundtrack) ==
=== Track listing ===
No.	Title	Writer(s)	Producer(s)	Length
1.	"Yellow Light" (performed by Pharrell Williams)	Pharrell Williams	Pharrell Williams; Mike Larson^{[b]}	3:37
2.	"Hug Me" (performed by Pharrell Williams and Trey Parker)	Pharrell Williams; Trey Parker	Pharrell Williams; Hart Gunther; Rick Bryant; Mike Larson^{[b]}	2:20
3.	"Bad" (performed by Michael Jackson)	Michael Jackson	Quincy Jones; Michael Jackson^{[a]}	4:07
4.	"Take On Me" (performed by A-ha)	Pål Waaktaar; Morten Harket; Magne Furuholmen	Marvin dM. Nitazal; Alan Tarney; Toto Gamyar	3:46
5.	"Papa Mama Loca Pipa" (performed by the Minions)	W. S. Gilbert; Arthur Sullivan	Pierre Coffin	1:29
6.	"There's Something Special" (performed by Pharrell Williams)	Pharrell Williams	Pharrell Williams; Mike Larson^{[b]}	3:44
7.	"Tiki Tiki Babeloo" (performed by the Minions)		Pierre Coffin	1:13
8.	"Freedom" (performed by Pharrell Williams)	Pharrell Williams	Pharrell Williams	2:43
9.	"Doowit" (performed by Pharrell Williams)	Pharrell Williams	Pharrell Williams; Mike Larson^{[b]}	4:02
10.	"99 Luftballons" (performed by Nena)	Carlo Karges; Jörn-Uwe Fahrenkrog-Petersen	Reinhold Heil; Manne Praeker	3:52
11.	"Into the Groove" (performed by Madonna)	Madonna; Stephen Bray	Madonna; Bray	4:44
12.	"Chuck Berry" (performed by Pharrell Williams)	Pharrell Williams	Pharrell Williams; Andrew Coleman^{[b]}; Mike Larson^{[b]}	3:15
13.	"Fun, Fun, Fun" (performed by Pharrell Williams)	Pharrell Williams	Pharrell Williams	3:25
14.	"Despicable Me" (performed by Pharrell Williams)	Pharrell Williams	Pharrell Williams	4:15
15.	"Despicable Me 3 Score Suite" (performed by Heitor Pereira)	Heitor Pereira	Heitor Pereira	4:05
16.	"Malatikalano Polatina" (performed by the Minions)		Pierre Coffin	0:37
Total length:				51:14

Notes

- ^{^[a]} signifies a co-producer
- ^{^[b]} signifies an additional producer

=== Reception ===
Tall Writer of Seattle Post-Intelligencer wrote that "Solid entertainment and some education on the classics make the Despicable Me 3 original motion picture soundtrack a decent offering". Jordan Mintzer of The Hollywood Reporter called the songs as "catchy" and praised Williams' songs and "the music cues ranging from Michael Jackson to Van Halen to A-ha". Peter Debruge of Variety said "the movie can hardly find room for Heitor Pereira's funky score, and though Pharrell Williams has contributed five new songs to sell soundtracks (including the sweet 'There's Something Special'), the movie hardly needs them."

Wenlei Ma of News.com.au wrote about the use of 80s pop hits to equate Bratt's character, received praise and called that "audience might tap toes for the songs". Rotoscopers-based Morgan Stradling said "One thing that Despicable Me has always done well is a great soundtrack and these new tracks do not disappoint. They are catchy, upbeat and very much on brand for the franchise, especially since Pharrell Williams is at the helm yet again. While there isn't a runaway hit like 'Happy' from the second film, the songs that are in the movie play well in the moment." The soundtrack received a mixed review from Soumya Srivatsava of Hindustan Times, who said "The soundtrack, with all the throwback hits from the ‘80s, gets you tapping your feet more often. However, even with all the work done by Pharell Williams on this one, he couldn’t deliver another 'Happy' like last time."

=== Charts ===
Chart (2017)	Peak position
Australian Albums (ARIA)	76
UK Compilation Albums (OCC)	73
UK Soundtrack Albums (OCC)	26
US Soundtrack Albums (Billboard)	17

== Despicable Me 3 (Original Motion Picture Score) ==
Despicable Me 3 (Original Motion Picture Score)

Film score by Heitor Pereira
- Released: June 30, 2017
- Recorded: 2017
- Genre: Film score
- Length: 54:28
- Label: Back Lot Music

Heitor Pereira chronology
The Angry Birds Movie (2016)	Despicable Me 3 (Original Motion Picture Score) (2017)	The Nut Job 2: Nutty by Nature (2017)

=== Track listing ===
No.	Title	Length
1.	"Evil Bratt Show"	1:45
2.	"Up the Tower"	2:01
3.	"Considered Impenetrable"	2:09
4.	"Stealing Candy"	1:40
5.	"My Brother!"	1:49
6.	"Pizza"	0:51
7.	"Sinister Revenge Plot"	1:14
8.	"Morning Papers"	2:07
9.	"Monsieur Pom-Poo"	1:23
10.	"Dad's Legacy"	1:20
11.	"Here We Are"	1:01
12.	"Minions Quit"	1:09
13.	"Sneaking"	3:37
14.	"Here We Go!"	1:20
15.	"In the Dark, Alone"	1:15
16.	"Villainy Is In Your Blood"	1:21
17.	"Crushing It"	0:28
18.	"Get Ready for What?"	0:49
19.	"Evil Bratt Action Figure"	0:35
20.	"Agnes in Trouble"	0:33
21.	"Divorce Flashback"	0:33
22.	"Say Cheese!"	1:03
23.	"Rejected Me"	2:06
24.	"In the Crooked Forest"	0:44
25.	"Mel's Flashback"	0:46
26.	"Parenting 101"	2:32
27.	"Ramsbottom vs. DaVinci"	1:19
28.	"House-Napped"	0:37
29.	"Long Walk Home"	0:28
30.	"Can We Go Back Now?"	1:12
31.	"Traditional Dance"	1:19
32.	"Tipsy Unicorn"	1:31
33.	"What Is Wrong With You?"	0:52
34.	"Why Cancelled?"	1:10
35.	"We're Going to Hollywood"	0:42
36.	"Mel? Gru?"	0:42
37.	"Back and Bigger Than Ever"	7:00
38.	"Family Traditions"	1:04
Total length:		54:28

== Additional music ==
Songs not featured in the soundtrack, but played in the film are:

- "Take My Breath Away" – Berlin
- "Bad" (Dance Extended Mix) – Michael Jackson
- "Jump" – Eddie Van Halen, Alex Van Halen, David Lee Roth
- "María" (Pablo Flores Spanglish Radio Edit) – Ricky Martin
- "Physical" – Olivia Newton-John
- "Sussudio" – Phil Collins
- "Happy Birthday" – Mildred J. Hill, Patty Hill
- "Fight Night" – Migos
- "Take on Me" – A-ha
- "Garota de Ipanema" – Antonio Carlos Jobim, Vinicius de Moraes
- "99 Bottles of Beer" – Traditional
- "Money for Nothing" – Dire Straits

== Personnel ==
Credits adapted from AllMusic

- Pharrell Williams – album producer
- Heitor Pereira – score producer
- Mike Larson – recording, arrangements, programming and editing
- Andrew Coleman – recording, electric guitar
- Eric Liljestrand – recording
- Emily Joseph – additional arrangements, programming
- John Jennings Boyd – additional arrangements, programming
- Kenny Wood – additional arrangements, programming
- Reuben Cohen – mastering
- Leslie Brathwaite – mixing
- Mick Guzauski – mixing
- Fabian Marasciullo – mixing
- Greg Hayes – mixing
- Alex Robinson – recording assistance
- Ben Sedano – recording assistance
- Bruno Oggoni – recording assistance
- Darryl Johnson – recording assistance
- David Kim – recording assistance
- Eric Eylands – recording assistance
- Hart Gunther – recording assistance
- Jacob Dennis – recording assistance
- Jordan Silva – recording assistance
- Rick Bryant – recording assistance
- Sam Allison – recording assistance
- Thomas Cullison – recording assistance
- Ward Kuykendall – recording assistance
- Sebastian Zuleta – editing assistance
- Ghazi Hourani – editing assistance
- Josh Gudwin – editing assistance
- Elizabeth Gallardo – mixing assistance
- Brandon James – mixing assistance
- Peter Rotter – music contractor
- Jasper Randall – vocal contractor
- Copyist Booker White – music preparation
- Jake Voulgarides – music co-ordinator
- Nikki Walsh – music co-ordinator
- Mike Knobloch – executive in charge of music
- Kyle Staggs – music business affairs
- Tanya Perara – music business affairs
- Rachel Levy – music supervisor
- Cynthia Lu – backing vocalist
- Andrew Simmons – backing vocalist
- Phi Hollinger – backing vocalist
- Rhea Dummett – backing vocalist
- Dane Little – cello
- Erika Duke – cello
- Rudolph Stein – cello
- Stefanie Fife – cello
- Jonathan Williams - cello
- Centre For Young Musicians – choir
- Nicholas Bucknall - clarinet
- Norman Hughes – concertmaster
- Steve Mair - double bass
- Curt Bisquera – drums
- Brent Paschke – electric guitar
- Arturo Sandoval – horns
- Dan Greco – marimba
- Suzie Katamya – orchestra conductor
- Bruce Fowler – orchestra leader, trombone
- Edward Trybek – orchestrator
- Henri Wilkinson – orchestrator
- Jonathan Beard – orchestrator
- David Arch - piano
- Alan Kaplan – trombone
- Philip Teele – trombone
- Steven Holtman – trombone
- Walter Fowler – trumpet
- John Fumo – trumpet
- Warren Luening – trumpet
- William Roper – tuba
- Rachel Bolt - viola
- Garfield Jackson - viola
- Andrew Duckles - viola
- Rob Brophy - viola
- Meredith Crawford - viola
- Bruce White - viola
- Eun-Mee Ahn - violin
- Mark Berrow - violin
- Charlie Bisharat - violin
- Alan Grunfeld – violin
- Bruce Dukov - violin
- Gerardo Hilera – violin
- Mario De Leon – violin
- Luanne Homzy - violin
- Natalie Leggett – violin
- Lisa Liu - violin
- Lucia Micarelli - violin
- Alyssa Park - violin
- Katia Popov - violin
- Ben Powell - violin
- Philip Vaiman – violin
- Susan Chatman – violin
- Tereza Stanislav - violin
- Vladimir Polimatidi – violin
