= Underworld (Tonight Alive album) =

Studio album by Tonight Alive
- Released: 12 January 2018
- Recorded: 2017
- Genre: Alternative rock; pop rock; pop punk
- Length: 46:57
- Label: UNFD; Hopeless
- Producer: Dave Petrovic

Tonight Alive chronology
Limitless (2016)	Underworld (2018)

Singles from Underworld
- 1. "Temple" Released: 17 October 2017; 2. "Crack My Heart" Released: 11 December 2017; 3. "Disappear" Released: 4 January 2018

Underworld is the fourth and final studio album by the Australian rock band Tonight Alive, released on 12 January 2018. It is also the last album to feature founding member and guitarist Whakaio Taahi, who departed the band upon the record's completion. The album was recorded in Thailand by producer Dave Petrovic, who has worked on nearly every Tonight Alive release to date. Underworld is the first album of the band's to be released on Australian independent label UNFD. It features contributions from Slipknot and Stone Sour frontman Corey Taylor, as well as PVRIS vocalist Lynn Gunn.

The album's first single, "Temple", was released in October 2017. It was followed by two further singles – "Crack My Heart" in December 2017, and "Disappear" in January 2018.

== Track listing ==
No.	Title	Length
1.	"Book of Love"	3:08
2.	"Temple"	3:29
3.	"Disappear" (featuring Lynn Gunn)	3:42
4.	"The Other"	3:52
5.	"In My Dreams"	4:07
6.	"For You"	3:22
7.	"Crack My Heart"	3:31
8.	"Just for Now"	3:58
9.	"Burning On"	3:19
10.	"Waiting for the End"	3:39
11.	"Last Light"	3:59
12.	"Looking for Heaven"	4:09
13.	"My Underworld" (featuring Corey Taylor)	3:36
Total length:		46:57

== Personnel ==
Tonight Alive

- Jenna McDougall – lead vocals, backing vocals, vocoder
- Whakaio Taahi – guitar, keyboards, piano
- Jake Hardy – guitar
- Cameron Adler – bass, backing vocals
- Matty Best – drums, percussion

Additional personnel

- Corey Taylor – vocals ("My Underworld")
- Lyndsey Gunnulfsen – backing vocals ("Disappear")

== Charts ==
Chart performance
Chart (2018)	Peak position
Australian Albums (ARIA)	11
Scottish Albums (OCC)	40
UK Albums (OCC)	55
UK Independent Albums (OCC)	6
UK Rock & Metal Albums (OCC)	3
US Independent Albums (Billboard)	5
US Indie Store Album Sales (Billboard)	1
US Top Album Sales (Billboard)	34
US Top Alternative Albums (Billboard)	24
US Top Rock Albums (Billboard)	41
