= The Edge (song) =

Single by Tonight Alive

from the album The Amazing Spider-Man 2: The Original Motion Picture Soundtrack
- Released: 1 April 2014
- Genre: Pop punk, alternative rock
- Length: 3:02
- Label: Sony Music Australia
- Songwriter(s): Tonight Alive

Tonight Alive singles chronology
"Come Home" (2013)	"The Edge" (2014)	"Human Interaction" (2015)

"The Edge" is a song by the Australian rock band Tonight Alive released on the soundtrack for The Amazing Spider-Man 2. It was released as a single on 1 April 2014. It was featured during the end credits for the international release of the film. It was released through Sony Music Entertainment. The song has been well received by critics and was accompanied with a music video with footage from the film incorporated to the band performing.

== Composition ==
The song was written by the band, and is described by critics as the type of song that could be "adapted into any situation." Lyrically, it speaks of an individual pleading for help in a dangerous or depressing situation, but is unable to reach who they are in need of. It makes reference to the death of Gwen Stacy in the film with the line "I call out but I fall / and I wonder if you ever cared at all." Tonight Alive themselves stated that the song was something that they were "really proud of" and were honored to have been involved with the Amazing Spider-Man franchise.

== Reception ==
"The Edge" received positive reviews. Melissa Redman from the British magazine Renowned for Sound complimented lead singer Jenna McDougall's vocals and stated that they "stole the show." Redman also described the track to have an "epic movie sound." She gave the song four out of five stars. Mark McConnville also gave four stars, stating the chorus would "raise hairs" and praised the band for coming up with such a strong song, despite that they haven't been around for a long time. Kaiyang Lin from Sound and Motion magazine gave the song an acclaimed review, describing it as "nothing short of epic" and "perfect," accurately fitting the theme. Jeremy Vane-Tempest from SFMedia compared the song favorably to those of Paramore, stating that such a band "should be looking over [Tonight Alive's] shoulders."

== Music video ==
The music video for "The Edge" shows the band performing as well as footage from The Amazing Spider-Man 2. In some instances, the band is shown with some elements of the film, such as being hit with waves from Electro.

== Live performances ==
The band performed the track on 8 March 2014 at the O2 Academy in Australia.

In response to the 2016 Pulse nightclub shooting, the band performed the song in honor of the victims at Vans Warped Tour. McDougall waived the Gay Pride flag while she sang. The band dedicated their set to the victims.
