= Son of God (soundtrack) =

Soundtracks to the 2014 film

Son of God (Original Motion Picture Soundtrack)

Soundtrack album / film score by Hans Zimmer, Lorne Balfe, Lisa Gerrard and various artists
- Released: February 25, 2024
- Recorded: 2013–2014
- Genres: Film score; Christian music
- Length: 64:30
- Label: Republic
- Producers: Hans Zimmer; Lorne Balfe; Steven Kofsky

Son of God (Music Inspired by the Epic Motion Picture)

Soundtrack album by various artists
- Released: February 25, 2014
- Genre: Christian music
- Length: 45:00
- Label: Word Entertainment

Two soundtracks were released for the epic biblical film Son of God: an original soundtrack and an album that featured music inspired by the film and an original soundtrack. The former featured compositions from the musical score composed by Hans Zimmer and Lorne Balfe and also featuring Lisa Gerrard; the trio worked on the History Channel television miniseries The Bible (2013), created by Mark Burnett and Roma Downey, who also produced the film under the Lightworkers Media. The album also consisted of remixed songs from CeeLo Green, OneRepublic, Sara Bareilles amongst others. The latter was distributed by Word Entertainment that featured contributions from Christian music artists Francesca Battistelli, Chris August, Dara Maclean, Sidewalk Prophets amongst others. Both the albums were released on February 25, 2014, three days before the film's release.

== Promotional tour ==
A promotional tour titled The Bible: Son of God Tour 2014, was announced by Downey and Burnett. It was held from March 20 to April 13, 2014, with August, Battistelli, Sidewalk Prophets, Meredith Andrews, Natalie Grant and Jason Gray among the featured artists, performing the songs at 16 cities across United States. It was described it as "an immersive music and visual experience" where the artists would perform the songs from The Bible and Son of God.

== Critical reception ==
Timothy Yap of JubileeCast wrote "It does the soul good for us to walk again in the footsteps of Jesus from birth to resurrection via these songs again." Bert Saraco of CCM Magazine wrote "The music is big and somber, majestic and mournful." A reviewer from Santa Barbara Independent wrote "The overweening Hans Zimmer music score gushes its way over the scenery". Martin Tsai of Los Angeles Times wrote "Hans Zimmer and Lorne Balfe have changed their tune here quite a bit to cinematic effect". Hannah Goodwyn of Christian Broadcasting Network wrote "A stunning score composed by Hans Zimmer and Lorne Balfe, and sung by Lisa Gerrard, helps to lift the black and red words of the Bible off paper and into our hearts." Grant Stevens of The Christian Chronicle called it as "a thundering score".

In contrast, Kyle Smith of New York Post wrote "the overbearing soundtrack turns what ought to be quietly transcendent moments into corn syrup." Todd McCarthy of The Hollywood Reporter wrote "The score by Hans Zimmer and Lorne Balfe lumbers more than it soars." Justin Chang of Variety wrote "Hans Zimmer and Lorne Balfe’s poundingly unsubtle score sounds better suited to a superhero movie — and not this kind." Claudia Puig of USA Today wrote "An overbearing musical score by Hans Zimmer threatens to bombard all of Bethlehem."

== Track listing ==
=== Son of God (Original Motion Picture Soundtrack) ===
US release
No.	Title	Artist(s)	Length
1.	"In the Beginning"	Hans Zimmer and Lorne Balfe	3:47
2.	"Through His Eyes"	Hans Zimmer and Lorne Balfe	4:51
3.	"Faith"	Hans Zimmer and Lorne Balfe feat. Lisa Gerrard	13:05
4.	"Roma's Lament"	Hans Zimmer and Lorne Balfe feat. Lisa Gerrard	5:41
5.	"Fisher of Men"	Hans Zimmer and Lorne Balfe	3:06
6.	"The Upper Room"	Hans Zimmer and Lorne Balfe	2:57
7.	"Promised King"	Hans Zimmer and Lorne Balfe feat. Lisa Gerrard	4:32
8.	"Truth"	Hans Zimmer and Lorne Balfe	2:44
9.	"Peace Be With You"	Hans Zimmer and Lorne Balfe feat. Lisa Gerrard	2:48
10.	"I Am"	Hans Zimmer and Lorne Balfe feat. Lisa Gerrard	3:44
11.	"Rise Up In Faith"	Hans Zimmer and Lorne Balfe feat. Lisa Gerrard	2:48
12.	"Mary, Did You Know?" (Son of God Remix)	CeeLo Green	2:44
13.	"Soul of a Man" (Son of God Remix)	Steven Stern and George Krikes	4:06
14.	"Wherever This Goes" (Son of God Remix)	The Fray	3:13
15.	"The Light" (Son of God Remix)	Sara Bareilles	4:24
Total length:			64:30

UK release
No.	Title	Artist(s)	Length
14.	"Life in Color" (Son of God Remix)	OneRepublic	4:23
15.	"Oceans" (Son of God Remix)	Hillsong United	7:11
Total length:			68:27

=== Son of God (Music Inspired by the Epic Motion Picture) ===
No.	Title	Artist(s)	Length
1.	"Oh, Son of God"	Francesca Battistelli	3:33
2.	"Jesus, Savior"	Chris August	2:20
3.	"Baby Boy"	For King & Country	3:39
4.	"He Said"	Group 1 Crew feat. Chris August	2:48
5.	"Our Only Hope"	Dara Maclean	3:32
6.	"Keep Making Me"	Sidewalk Prophets	3:21
7.	"Only Jesus"	Point of Grace	3:48
8.	"I Believe"	Jason Castro	3:36
9.	"God of the Impossible"	Everfound	4:27
10.	"He Is With Us"	Love & the Outcome	3:47
11.	"Jesus Move"	Big Daddy Weave	5:20
12.	"The Gospel Changes Everything"	Meredith Andrews	4:49
Total length:			45:00

== Personnel ==
Credits adapted from liner notes:

- Music composer – Hans Zimmer, Lorne Balfe
- Producer – Hans Zimmer, Lorne Balfe, Steven Kofsky
- Arrangement – Andrew Christie, Dave Fleming, Gary Dworetsky, Jasha Klebe, Max Aruj, Satnam Ramgotra, Steve Mazarro
- Engineer – Peter Nelson
- Vocals – Lisa Gerrard
- Electric cello – Christine Wu
- Recording and mixing – Daniel Kresco, Satoshi Noguchi
- Mastering – Pat Sullivan
- Music editor – Jessica Weiss, Rodney Berling
- Ambient sound design – Mel Wesson
- Digital instrument design – Mark Wherry
- Music production services – Steven Kofsky
- Technical assistance – Nathan Stornetta
- Coordinator – Kelly Johnson
- Copyist – Andrew Christie
- Studio management – Czarina Russell
- Creative director – Sandy Brummels
- A&R – Tom Mackay

== Chart performance ==
Chart performance for Son of God (Original Motion Picture Soundtrack)
Chart (2014)	Peak position
US Billboard 200	67
US Top Christian Albums (Billboard)	4
US Top Current Album Sales (Billboard)	62
US Top Soundtracks (Billboard)	3

Chart performance for Son of God (Music Inspired by the Epic Motion Picture)
Chart (2014)	Peak position
US Top Christian Albums (Billboard)	25
