= Tonight Alive =

Australian rock band

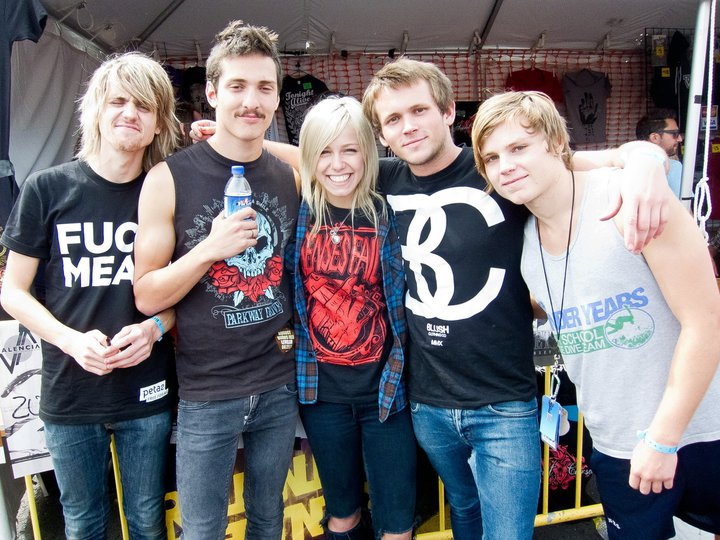
- Tonight Alive at The Bamboozle festival 2011

Background information
- Origin: Sydney, Australia
- Genres: Pop-punk; pop rock; power pop; alternative rock; emo
- Years active: 2008–2018, 2020, 2024–present
- Labels: Sony Music; Fearless; Hopeless; UNFD
- Spinoffs: Hevenshe
- Members: Jenna McDougall; Jake Hardy; Cameron Adler; Matty Best
- Past members: Mitchell Stanger; Whakaio Taahi
- Website: tonightalive.com

Tonight Alive are an Australian rock band from Sydney. For the majority of the band's career, the line-up consisted of lead vocalist Jenna McDougall, guitarists Jake Hardy and Whakaio Taahi, bassist Cameron Adler, and drummer Matty Best. Formed in 2008 by Hardy, Adler and Taahi, soon joined by McDougall and Best, Tonight Alive recorded and self-released the EPs All Shapes & Disguises and Consider This. In 2010, Tonight Alive signed to both Fearless Records and Sony Music Entertainment Australia and released their 2011 debut album What Are You So Scared Of?. The record was officially released in the UK and US in October 2012, a year after its initial release in Australia.

Their second studio album, The Other Side, was recorded in Australia and released 6 September 2013, featuring the singles Lonely Girl and Come Home. It debuted on the ARIA Albums Chart at No. 5. The band contributed the song "The Edge" to The Amazing Spider-Man 2 Soundtrack. The band released "Human Interaction" on 30 October 2015, followed by their third album, Limitless, which debuted to mixed response on 4 March 2016. Lead guitarist and songwriter Whakaio Taahi departed the group in late 2017, shortly after the band finished recording their fourth album, Underworld, which was released on 12 January 2018. Tonight Alive have been listed as one of the top 10 Australian bands in 2010 on American rock radio station KROQ.

== History ==
=== 2008: Formation ===
Guitarist Jake Hardy and bassist Cameron Adler already had an existing rock project covering other bands' material. Later, they met Whakaio Taahi through mutual friends, and asked him to join in on keyboard and lead guitar.

Jenna McDougall was writing her own acoustic music at the time, and had Adler helping her record and produce a demo. After the demo was finished, Adler gave McDougall a song the band had written and asked her to record her vocals over it. On 31 May 2008, the day before her sixteenth birthday, McDougall joined as lead vocalist, forming the first lineup of the band.

With shows booked and no band name, the band got together and cut out words they thought described livelihood and the band, coming up with the name Tonight Alive.

In 2009, Tonight Alive's original drummer Mitchell Stanger departed the group. Matty Best, a high school friend of Taahi, joined on after learning from Taahi's mother that they needed a drummer. Best, who comes from Ulladulla, travelled three to four hours to band practice.

The band started to make a name for themselves opening for metal bands, playing small festival type shows like Warped Tour, and spent plenty of time playing local shows at youth centres around the Sydney area.

=== 2009–2010: All Shapes and Disguises and Consider This EP ===
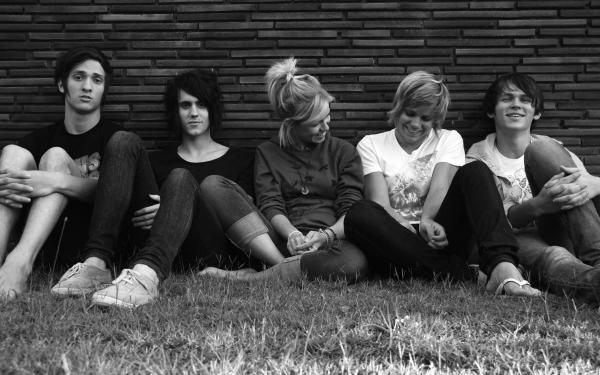
Tonight Alive in 2010

In 2009, the band entered the studio to record their debut self-funded EP All Shapes & Disguises with producer Greg Stace and producer Dave Petrovic, which was released in June 2010, with their music video and debut single "Wasting Away" being released that same month. McDougall was still in school at the time. She took time off school to record, and her parents covered her share of the cost to rent studio space.

The track "Closer" was featured on season six of the US reality TV show The Hills.

In November 2010, the band released a three-track EP Consider This, before heading on a national tour with Australian band Sienna Skies.

=== 2011–2012: What Are You So Scared Of? ===
After being noticed by some large record labels, Tonight Alive was invited to play a showcase. Despite both guitarists, Taahi and Hardy, snapping a string each on the first song, the band was signed anyway.

In late 2010, a demo of Tonight Alive's new material landed on producer Mark Trombino's desk. He then contacted the band, wanting to take part in producing their debut full-length record. Speaking on behalf of the band, Jenna reflected, "For him to contact us, and say he was interested, was a big deal. We couldn't believe he'd put himself out like that. He's amazing. Mark created the albums we all grew up listening to – the albums that launched the careers of all these great bands."

In the early months of 2011, Tonight Alive flew to Los Angeles and recorded their debut full-length at NRG Studios over two months.

The track "To Die For", originally from the band's first EP All Shapes & Disguises and "Thank You and Goodnight", originally from the band's second EP Consider This, was re-recorded on this record. "Thank You & Goodnight" features guest vocals from Blink-182's Mark Hoppus.

The first single, "Starlight", was released 1 July, and a music video was released three days later. The second single, "Let It Land" was released along with a music video for the track on 19 September.

Tonight Alive toured the US and took part on the annual Bamboozle festival, playing the 1 May date on the Zumiez stage alongside New Found Glory, Valencia, Thrice, The Downtown Fiction and more.

The band is featured on the Punk Goes Pop 4 compilation CD, covering "Little Lion Man" by British indie rock band, Mumford & Sons, which was released on 21 November.

McDougall was part of Good Charlotte's song "Like It's Her Birthday" and was also featured on Simple Plan's song "Jet Lag" during the Australian leg of Simple Plan's most recent tour. She was also featured on the Divided by Friday song "Face to Face".

What Are You So Scared Of? was released under Sony Records Australia on 14 October 2011, however in November 2011 Tonight Alive signed to Fearless Records, and re-released the Consider This EP on 8 November and their debut record What Are You So Scared Of? 4 months later in the US.

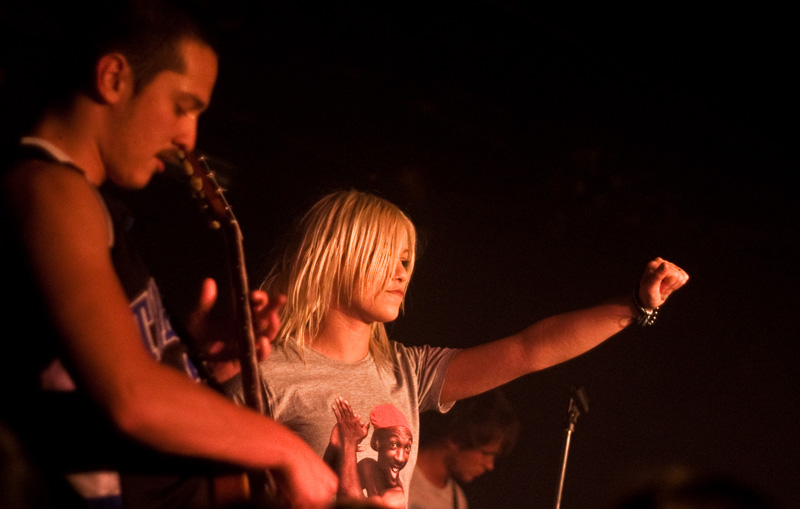
Tonight Alive in 2012

The band released their Consider This EP in the UK through Banquet Records on 2 April 2012.

Tonight Alive appeared on the 2011 Fearless Friends Tour alongside blessthefall, The Word Alive, Motionless in White, and Chunk! No, Captain Chunk.

The band was set to play on the Lucky Street Tour with Go Radio and This Providence and SXSW until they had to pull out due to medical issues, writing on their Facebook page: "We're very sorry to announce that we are having to cancel our upcoming tour with Go Radio and SXSW appearances due to serious medical issues." This was later revealed to be due to Mcdougall suffering from severe eczema, making it hard for her to move. They later headed to Japan for the shows with Young Guns and also they had a first headline show at Shibuya-AX. Tonight Alive played the entire Warped Tour 2012.

During their time on The Vans Warped Tour 2012, the band began video production of "Listening", their third single release from What Are You So Scared Of? Despite the fact that "Breaking and Entering" had previously been released as a digital download and music video, according to McDougall, "Listening" served as the third official single from WAYSSO?. The music video for "Listening", released on YouTube on 12 October 2012, was used to document the band's final few days on the summer-long tour in a montage music video.

=== 2013–2014: The Other Side ===
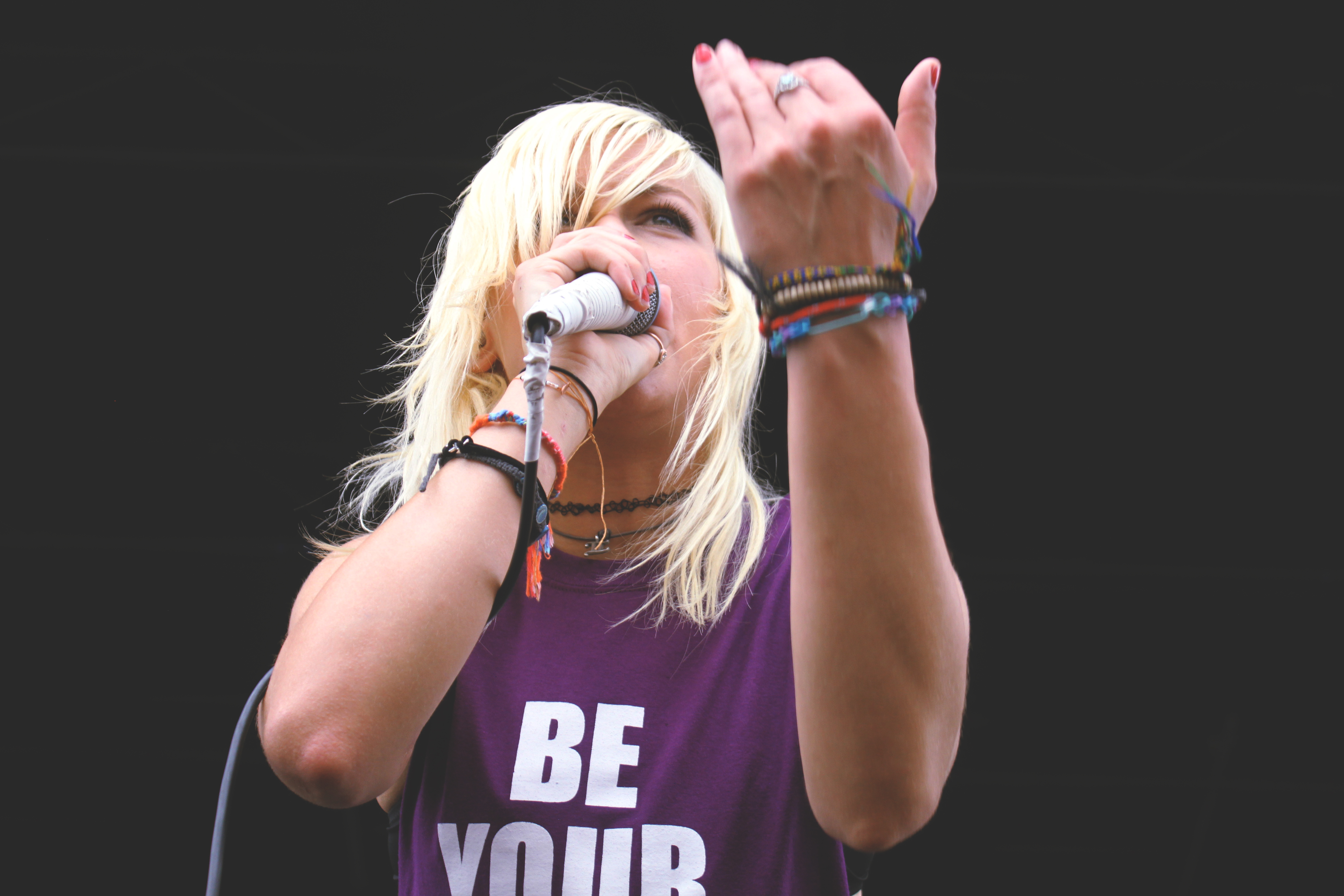
Lead vocalist Jenna McDougall in 2013

Tonight Alive released a stand-alone single called "Breakdown" on 12 March 2013 which featured Good Charlotte's Benji Madden. The band recorded their next album, The Other Side, in Coffs Harbour, Australia, which was released on 6 September 2013 through Sony and Fearless Records. The first single is "The Ocean", which premiered on Radio 1 in the UK on 11 July to coincide with the announcement of the album. "The Ocean" was later released to iTunes on 22 July. A teaser for the band's next single, "Lonely Girl" was released 24 July. The single was fully released later that night. An accompanying music video was premiered on 15 August. The track "Come Home" was released as a single in late September, along with the music video on the band's Vevo channel.

Tonight Alive toured the US as part of the 2013 Vans Warped Tour. They played a few dates in Australia before touring again in support of the new album, along with two Rolling Stone Live Lodge acoustic shows. They were also part of Warped Tour Australia lineup in November 2013.

They then went on The Other Side tour to promote their new album in Australia and later the U.S., playing with The Downtown Fiction, For the Foxes, and Echosmith. The tour ended on 23 November.

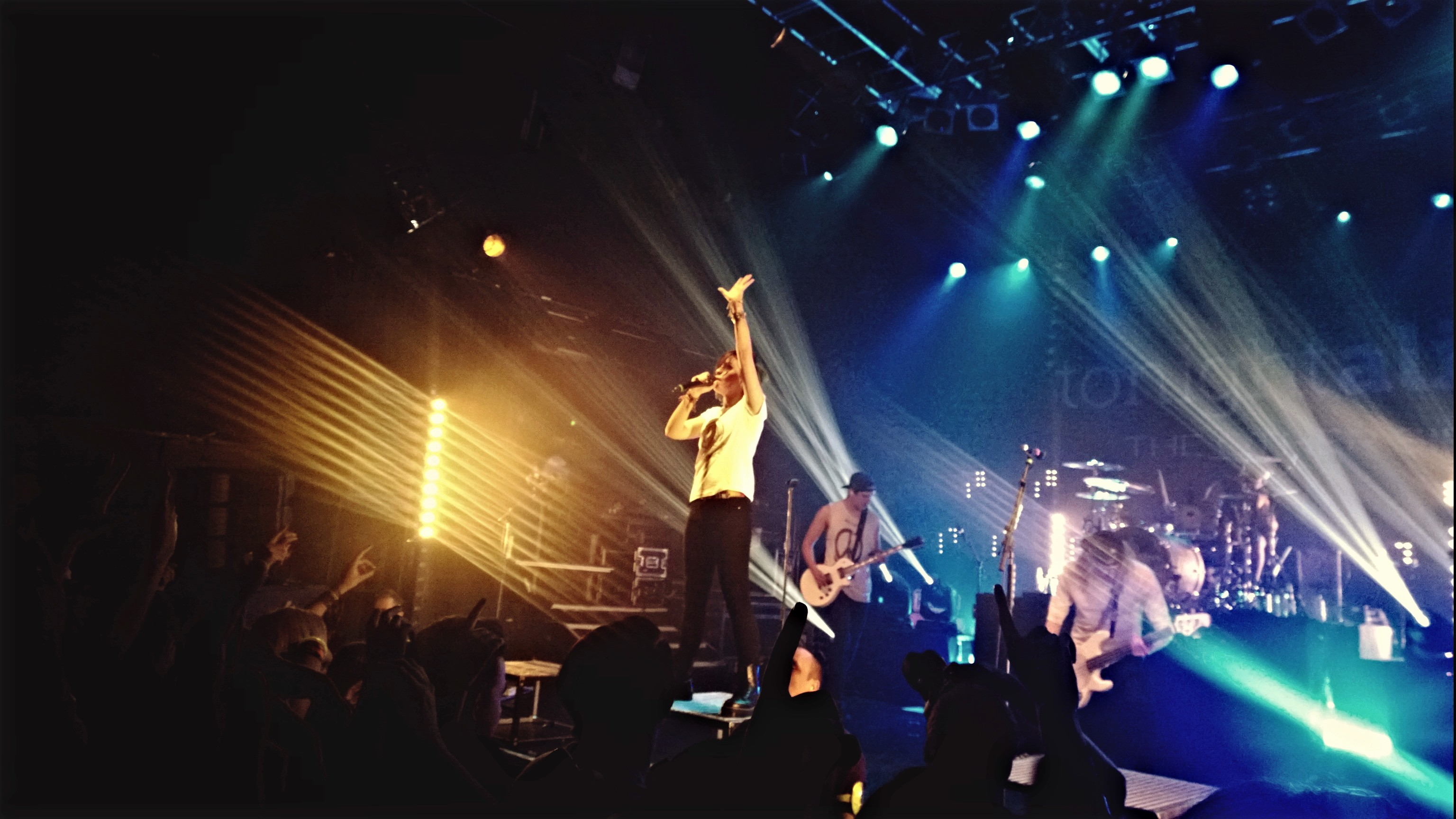
Tonight Alive performing in London, November 2014

The band announced in mid-December that they would be supporting All Time Low on their A Love like War: UK Tour. It was announced in late January 2014 that the band would be supporting Taking Back Sunday and The Used on their co-headlining North American tour. The tour began in March 2014.

Tonight Alive contributed their original song "The Edge" for Sony and Marvel's film The Amazing Spider-Man 2 and it was featured on the deluxe edition of the soundtrack in Australia, New Zealand, UK and Ireland. They toured with Mayday Parade, PVRIS, and Major League. They also played The Other Side in its entirety while on tour in the UK.

=== 2015–2016: Limitless ===
In January 2015, it was announced the band would be supporting All Time Low on their upcoming spring tour with Issues and State Champs.

The band began working on their third album in March 2015, with producer David Bendeth They played at Soundwave 2015 in Australia. They released a statement in April cancelling two headlining shows in the US due to the drummer, Best, needing surgery for tendinosis. Tonight Alive completed work on their third album in July 2015.

On 30 October 2015, the band announced that their third studio album, Limitless, would be released on 4 March 2016 The announcement coincided with the release of the first single, "Human Interaction". On 21 November, the band released the second single from Limitless, entitled "To Be Free". The band streamed "Drive" on Spotify on 11 December, and made it available with preorders for their album.

The third single, "How Does It Feel?", and its accompanying music video were released on 12 January 2016.

=== 2017–2018: Label change, Taahi's departure, and Underworld ===
On 3 April 2017, the group announced they had signed to Hopeless Records and UNFD, and released a standalone single, "World Away". The band recorded material for a new album in Thailand with Dave Petrovic in July 2017. On 16 October they released a single, "Temple" and announced their fourth album, Underworld. The announcement also coincided with the announcement that Taahi had departed the group after the finish of production on Underworld, citing his decision to further his song-writing and producing career. The remaining members embarked on an Australian tour in November 2017 as a quartet.

On 11 December 2017, the group released "Crack My Heart" as the second single from Underworld, while on 4 January 2018, the third single, "Disappear" featuring PVRIS' Lynn Gunn, was released. The album was released on 12 January via UNFD in Australia and Hopeless Records internationally.

=== 2018–present: Hiatus, new projects and reunions ===
In December 2018, after performing at the inaugural Good Things festival, the band announced they were going on an international touring hiatus and cancelled their upcoming US tour, to "address and prioritise" their "mental and physical health". The announcement came after a 46-year-old security guard died during their performance at Good Things in Sydney. The following year, Best relocated to the US and joined Sleeping with Sirens as their new drummer.

In September 2019, the band were announced on the lineup for the 2020 Unify Gathering. Due to Best's commitments with Sleeping with Sirens, he was replaced by session drummer Stan Bicknell. They were also joined during the set by Marie DeVita of Waax, Marcus Bridge of Northlane, Matt Gravolin of Deez Nuts and I Killed the Prom Queen and Dre Faivre of Hellions. Following their appearance at the festival, the band also played a bushfire fundraiser at the Corner Hotel in Melbourne alongside fellow Unify Gathering bands The Amity Affliction, Northlane, Ocean Grove and Windwaker.

On 25 May 2022, McDougall announced a new solo project entitled Hevenshe. The first single under this moniker, "No One Will Ever Love You", was released on 6 June 2022.

Tonight Alive reunited for the third annual When We Were Young Festival on 19 and 20 October 2024, where they performed songs from The Other Side.

In May 2025, the band announced a one-off Melbourne show on 19 September 2025. In August, the band were announced on the line-up for Good Things 2025.

== Musical style ==
Tonight Alive are described as pop punk, pop rock, power pop, alternative rock and emo by music sources. The band are often compared to fellow alternative rock/pop punk band Paramore. Regarding the comparison, guitarist Whakaio Taahi stated "People are going to compare, it's human nature but we don't really let it affect us. We just do what we love to do and hope people like it." Screen Rant stated that the band "are best remembered for their heart and enthusiasm."

== Band members ==
Current

- Jenna McDougall – lead vocals, occasional acoustic guitar and piano (2008–2018, 2020, 2024–present)
- Jake Hardy – lead guitar (2017–2018, 2020, 2024–present), rhythm guitar (2008–2018, 2020, 2024–present)
- Cameron "Cam" Adler – bass, backing vocals (2008–2018, 2020, 2024–present)
- Matty Best – drums, percussion (2009–2018, 2024–present)

Former

- Mitchell Stanger – drums, percussion (2008–2009)
- Whakaio "Whak" Taahi – lead guitar, keyboards, backing vocals (2008–2017)

Touring

- Stan Bicknell – drums (2020)

== Discography ==
Studio albums

- What Are You So Scared Of? (2011)
- The Other Side (2013)
- Limitless (2016)
- Underworld (2018)
