= Consider This (EP) =

EP by Tonight Alive
- Released: 2010; 8 November 2011 (US)
- Genre: Pop punk
- Label: Takedown Records, Fearless Records (U.S release)

Tonight Alive chronology
All Shapes & Disguises (2010)	Consider This (2010)	What Are You So Scared Of? (2011)

Consider This is the second EP by the Australian rock band Tonight Alive. It was first recorded and released through Takedown Records in 2010, and was later re-released through both Sony Records and Fearless Records in 2011.

== Track listing ==
Original release
No.	Title	Length
1.	"Revenge and Its Thrills"	2:46
2.	"Five Years"	2:50
3.	"Thank You and Goodnight"	3:15

Re-release
No.	Title	Length
1.	"Wasting Away"	2:50
2.	"Five Years"	2:50
3.	"My Favourite Thing"	3:04
4.	"Revenge and Its Thrills"	2:46
5.	"Invincible"	2:28
