= Mayday Parade discography =

- Mayday Parade at the 2008 Buzz Bake Sale
- Studio albums: 7
- EPs: 6
- Singles: 36
- Music videos: 35

Mayday Parade, an American rock band have released seven studio albums, six extended plays, and 36 singles. The group has also made 35 music videos of their songs. As of July 2013, the band has sold 600,000 copies of their albums and 3,000,000 copies of their songs. The group's debut studio album, A Lesson in Romantics was released on July 10, 2007. The tracks "Jamie All Over" and "Miserable at Best", have been certified Platinum and Gold by the RIAA, respectively. Their second studio album, Anywhere but Here was released on October 6, 2009 and peaked at number 31 on the US Billboard 200. Their self-titled third studio album was released on October 4, 2011. They released a cover of "Somebody That I Used to Know" in 2012 and the song peaked at number 19 on the US Heatseekers Songs chart.

Their fourth studio album, Monsters in the Closet was released on October 8, 2013 and peaked at number ten on the Billboard 200. The album's lead single "Ghosts" managed to chart on the US Hot Rock & Alternative Songs at number 46. The group's fifth studio album, Black Lines was released on October 9, 2015. Their sixth studio album, Sunnyland was released on June 15, 2018. Their seventh studio album, What It Means To Fall Apart was released on November 19, 2021.

The group announced a three-part album with the first installment, Sweet, released on April 18, 2025. The second installment, Sad was released on October 3, 2025.

== Studio albums ==
List of studio albums, with selected chart positions, sales figures and certifications
| Title | Album details | Peak chart positions | | | | | | | | Sales | Certifications |
| Title | Album details | US | US Indie | US Rock | US Alt. | AUS | NZ Heat. | UK | UK Indie | Sales | Certifications |
|---|---|---|---|---|---|---|---|---|---|---|---|
| A Lesson in Romantics (Note: Released on vinyl in November 2011.) | Released: July 10, 2007; Label: Fearless (FRL 30099); Format: CD, DL, LP | — (Note: A Lesson in Romantics did not enter the Billboard 200, but peaked at number 8 on the US Heatseekers Albums Chart.) | 31 | — | — | — | — | — | — | US: 200,000 | RIAA: Gold |
| Anywhere but Here | Released: October 6, 2009; Label: Fearless/Atlantic (2-521114); Format: CD, DL, LP | 31 | — | 12 | 8 | — | — | — | — | US: 17,780 | |
| Mayday Parade | Released: October 4, 2011; Label: ILG/Fearless/MDP (MDY2-528824); Format: CD, DL, LP | 12 | 2 | 5 | 4 | 84 | — | — (Note: Mayday Parade did not enter the UK Albums Chart, but peaked at number 86 on the UK Album Downloads chart.) | 40 | US: 100,000+ | |
| Monsters in the Closet | Released: October 8, 2013; Label: Fearless (FRL 30180); Format: CD, DL, LP | 10 | 2 | 4 | 4 | 52 | — | 103 | 22 | US: 30,000 | |
| Black Lines | Released: October 9, 2015; Label: Fearless (FRL30217); Format: CD, DL, LP | 21 | 3 | 1 | 1 | 32 | — | 107 | 15 | US: 16,000 | |
| Sunnyland | Released: June 15, 2018; Label: Rise; Format: CD, CS, DL, LP | 104 | 9 | 14 | 7 | 91 | 8 | — | 32 | | |
| What It Means to Fall Apart | Released: November 19, 2021; Label: Rise; Format: CD, CS, DL, LP | — | — | — | — | — | — | — | — (Note: What It Means to Fall Apart did not enter the UK Independent Albums Chart, but peaked at number 36 on the UK Record Store Chart.) | | |
"—" denotes a recording that did not chart or was not released in that territory.

== Extended plays ==
List of extended plays, with selected chart positions and sales figures
| Title | Album details | Peak chart positions | | | | | Sales |
| Title | Album details | US | US Rock | US Alt. | UK Down. | UK Indie | Sales |
|---|---|---|---|---|---|---|---|
| Tales Told by Dead Friends (Note: Later re-released by Fearless in November 2006. It was released on vinyl in December 2013.) | Released: June 13, 2006; Label: Self-released; Format: CD, DL, 10" vinyl | — (Note: Tales Told By Dead Friends did not enter the Billboard 200, but peaked at number 12 on the US Vinyl Albums Chart.) | — | — | — | — | US: 50,000 |
| Valdosta | Released: March 8, 2011; Label: Fearless/Atlantic (2-526221); Format: CD, DL | 127 | 30 | 19 | — | — | |
| Out of Here | Released: October 16, 2020; Label: Rise; Format: DL, LP | — | — | — | — | — | |
| Mayday Parade Lofi | Released: March 8, 2024; Label: Self-released; Format: DL | — | — | — | — | — | |
| Sweet | Released: April 18, 2025; Label: Many Hats Endeavors; Format: DL, LP | — | — | — | 98 | 38 | |
| Sad | Released: October 3, 2025; Label: Many Hats Endeavors; Format: DL | — | — | — | — | — | |
| Sugar | Released: July 24, 2026; Label: Many Hats Endeavors; Format: DL | | | | | | |
"—" denotes a recording that did not chart or was not released in that territory.

== Singles ==
List of singles, with selected chart positions and certifications, showing year released and album name
| Title | Year | Peak chart positions | | | | Certifications | Album |
| Title | Year | US Airplay | US Heat | US Rock | UK Rock | Certifications | Album |
|---|---|---|---|---|---|---|---|
| "When I Get Home, You're So Dead" | 2007 | — | — | — | — | | A Lesson in Romantics |
| "Jamie All Over" | 2008 | — | — | — | — | RIAA: Platinum | A Lesson in Romantics |
| "The Silence" | 2009 | — | — | — | — | | Anywhere but Here |
| "Kids in Love" | 2010 | 84 | — | — | — | | Anywhere but Here |
| "Anywhere but Here" | 2010 | — | — | — | — | | Anywhere but Here |
| "In My Head" | 2010 | — | — | — | — | | Punk Goes Pop 3 |
| "Oh Well, Oh Well" | 2011 | — | — | — | — | | Mayday Parade |
| "When You See My Friends" | 2011 | — | — | — | — | | Mayday Parade |
| "Somebody That I Used to Know" | 2012 | — | 19 | 18 | 32 | RIAA: Gold | Punk Goes Pop 5 |
| "Ghosts" | 2013 | — | — | 46 | 35 | | Monsters in the Closet |
| "Girls" | 2013 | — | — | — | — | | Monsters in the Closet |
| "Comedown" | 2014 | — | — | — | — | | Punk Goes 90s Vol. 2 |
| "Keep in Mind, Transmogrification Is a New Technology" | 2015 | — | — | — | — | | Black Lines |
| "Letting Go" | 2015 | — | — | — | — | | Black Lines |
| "Piece of Your Heart" | 2018 | — | — | — | — | | Sunnyland |
| "Never Sure" | 2018 | — | — | — | — | | Sunnyland |
| "It's Hard to be Religious When Certain People Aren't Incinerated by Bolts of Lightning" | 2018 | — | — | — | — | | Sunnyland |
| "Stay the Same" | 2018 | — | — | — | — | | Sunnyland |
| "New Years Project" | 2019 | — | — | — | — | | Non-album single |
| "I'm with You" | 2019 | — | — | — | — | | Non-album single |
| "It Is What It Is" | 2020 | — | — | — | — | | Non-album single |
| "Lighten Up Kid" | 2020 | — | — | — | — | | Out of Here |
| "Kids of Summer" | 2021 | — | — | — | — | | What It Means to Fall Apart |
| "Bad at Love" | 2021 | — | — | — | — | | What It Means to Fall Apart |
| "One for the Rocks and One for the Scary" | 2021 | — | — | — | — | | What It Means to Fall Apart |
| "Golden Days" | 2021 | — | — | — | — | | What It Means to Fall Apart |
| "Think of You" | 2021 | — | — | — | — | | What It Means to Fall Apart |
| "Losing My Mind" | 2022 | — | — | — | — | | Non-album singles |
| "Thunder" | 2022 | — | — | — | — | | Non-album singles |
| "More Like a Crash" | 2023 | — | — | — | — | | Non-album singles |
| "Got Me All Wrong" | 2023 | — | — | — | — | | Non-album singles |
| "Pretty Good to Feel Something" | 2024 | — | — | — | — | | Sweet |
| "By the Way" | 2025 | — | — | — | — | | Sweet |
| "Towards You" | 2025 | — | — | — | — | | Sweet |
| "Under My Sweater" | 2025 | — | — | — | — | | Sad |
| "One Day at a Time" | 2025 | — | — | — | — | | Sad |
"—" denotes a recording that did not chart or was not released in that territory.

=== Promotional singles ===
List of promotional singles
| Title | Year | Album |
|---|---|---|
| "Black Cat" | 2007 | A Lesson in Romantics |
| "Get Up" | 2009 | Anywhere but Here |
| "Worth a Thousand Words" | 2014 | Monster in the Closet |
| "Stuck in Remission" | 2014 | Monster in the Closet |
| "Hear the Sound" | 2014 | Monster in the Closet |

== Other charted and certified songs ==
List of other charted songs, with selected chart positions and certifications, showing year released and album name
| Title | Year | Peak chart positions | | Certifications | Album |
| Title | Year | US Rock Digital | UK Physical | Certifications | Album |
|---|---|---|---|---|---|
| "Miserable at Best" | 2007 | — | — | RIAA: Gold | A Lesson in Romantics |
| "Terrible Things" | 2011 | — | — | RIAA: Gold | Valdosta |
| "Stay" | 2011 | 26 | — | | Mayday Parade |
| "First Train" | 2020 | — | 17 | | Out of Here |
"—" denotes a recording that did not chart or was not released in that territory.

== Music videos ==
List of music videos, showing year released and director
| Title | Year | Director |
|---|---|---|
| "Black Cat" (Live) | 2007 | Unknown |
| "When I Get Home, You're So Dead" | 2007 | Marco de la Torre |
| "Jamie All Over" | 2008 | Travis Kopach |
| "Miserable at Best" | 2009 | Mark Staubach |
| "The Silence" | 2009 | RAGE |
| "Kids in Love" | 2010 | Josh Mond |
| "Oh Well, Oh Well" | 2011 | Thunder Down Country |
| "When You See My Friends" (Live) | 2011 | |
| "Stay" | 2012 | Thunder Down Country |
| "Ghosts" | 2013 | Brant Kantor |
| "Hold Onto Me" | 2014 | Dan Centrone |
| "Keep in Mind, Transmogrification Is a New Technology" | 2015 | |
| "One of Them Will Destroy the Other" | 2015 | Caleb Mallery |
| "Letting Go" | 2016 | Dan Fusselman |
| "Let's Be Honest" | 2016 | Dan Fusselman |
| "The Problem With the Big Picture Is That It's Hard to See" | 2016 | |
| "Black Cat" | 2017 | Max Moore |
| "Piece Of Your Heart" | 2018 | Miguel Barbosa |
| "It's Hard To Be Religious When Certain People Are Never Incinerated by Bolts of Lightning" | 2018 | Miguel Barbosa |
| "Sunnyland" | 2019 | Erik Rojas |
| "Never Sure" | 2019 | |
| "Looks Red, Tastes Blue" | 2019 | Marlon Brandope |
| "First Train" | 2020 | Scott Hansen |
| "I Can Only Hope" | 2020 | Guadalupe Bustos |
| "Kids Of Summer" | 2021 | Guadalupe Bustos |
| "Bad At Love" | 2021 | Katharine White |
| "One For The Rocks And One For The Scary" | 2021 | Katharine White |
| "Think Of You" | 2021 | Katharine White |
| "Losing My Mind" | 2022 | Alex Bemis |
| "Thunder" | 2022 | Alex Bemis |
| "More Like a Crash" | 2023 | Guadalupe Bustos |
| "Miracle" | 2023 | Unknown |
| "By the Way" | 2025 | Benjamin Lieber |
| "Who's Laughing Now" | 2025 | Benjamin Lieber |
| "Under My Sweater" | 2025 | Benjamin Lieber |

== Original multi-artist compilation appearances ==
- Punk Goes Acoustic 2 with "Three Cheers for Five Years" (acoustic)
- Punk Goes Pop 2 with "When I Grow Up" (Pussycat Dolls cover)
- Punk Goes Classic Rock with "We Are the Champions" (Queen cover)
- Punk Goes Pop 3 with "In My Head" (Jason Derülo cover)
- Take Action! Vol. 9 with "The Silence" (Hurley Studio acoustic)
- Punk Goes Pop 5 with "Somebody That I Used to Know" feat. Vic Fuentes (Gotye cover)
- Punk Goes 90's 2 with "Comedown" (Bush cover)
- A Whole New Sound with "Remember Me" from the movie Coco

== See also ==
- List of songs recorded by Mayday Parade
