= List of songs recorded by Mayday Parade =

The following is a sortable table of all songs by Mayday Parade:

- The column Song list the song title.
- The column Writer(s) lists who wrote the song.
- The column Album lists the album the song is featured on.
- The column Producer lists the producer of the song.
- The column Year lists the year in which the song was released.
- The column Length list the length/duration of the song.

== Studio recordings ==
Song	Writer(s)	Album	Producer	Year	Length
"12 Through 15"	Mayday Parade	Monsters in the Closet	Zack Odom, Kenneth Mount	2013	4:58
"A Shot Across the Bow"	Mayday Parade	Mayday Parade	Zack Odom, Kenneth Mount	2011	3:45
"All on Me"	Mayday Parade	Black Lines	Mike Sapone	2015	4:15
"Always Leaving"	Mayday Parade	Sunnyland	Zack Odom, Kenneth Mount	2018	3:42
"Amber Lynn"	Mayday Parade	Valdosta (EP)	Lee Dyess	2011	3:53
"Angels"	Mayday Parade	Monsters in the Closet	Zack Odom, Kenneth Mount	2013	4:14
"Anywhere But Here"	Mayday Parade, David Hodges	Anywhere but Here	David Bendeth	2009	3:09
"Black Cat"	Mayday Parade	A Lesson in Romantics	Zack Odom, Kenneth Mount	2007	3:23
"Bruised and Scarred"	Mayday Parade, Bobby Huff, David Bendeth	Anywhere but Here	David Bendeth	2009	3:23
"Bruised and Scarred" (acoustic)	Mayday Parade, Bobby Huff, David Bendeth	Valdosta (EP)	Lee Dyess	2011	3:22
"Call Me Hopeless, Not Romantic"	Mayday Parade	Mayday Parade	Zack Odom, Kenneth Mount	2011	3:29
"Center of Attention"	Mayday Parade, Sam Hollander, Dave Katz	Anywhere but Here	David Bendeth	2009	3:01
"Champagne's for Celebrating (I'll Have a Martini)"	Mayday Parade	A Lesson in Romantics	Zack Odom, Kenneth Mount	2007	3:58
"Comedown"	Gavin Rossdale	Punk Goes 90s Vol. 2	–	2014	5:34
"Demons"	Mayday Parade	Monsters in the Closet	Zack Odom, Kenneth Mount	2013	3:31
"Even Robots Need Blankets"	Mayday Parade	Monsters in the Closet	Zack Odom, Kenneth Mount	2013	3:24
"Everything's an Illusion"	Mayday Parade	Mayday Parade	Zack Odom, Kenneth Mount	2011	3:27
"Get Up"	Mayday Parade, Bobby Huff	Anywhere but Here	David Bendeth	2009	3:03
"Ghosts"	Mayday Parade	Monsters in the Closet	Zack Odom, Kenneth Mount	2013	4:42
"Girls"	Mayday Parade	Monsters in the Closet	Zack Odom, Kenneth Mount	2013	3:22
"Happy Endings Are Stories That Haven't Ended Yet"	Mayday Parade	Mayday Parade	Zack Odom, Kenneth Mount	2011	4:38
"Hear the Sound"^{[E]}	Mayday Parade	Monsters in the Closet	Zack Odom, Kenneth Mount	2014	4:05
"Hold Onto Me"	Mayday Parade	Monsters in the Closet	Zack Odom, Kenneth Mount	2013	3:15
"Hollow"	Mayday Parade	Black Lines	Mike Sapone	2015	3:12
"How Do You Like Me Now"	Mayday Parade	Sunnyland	Zack Odom, Kenneth Mount	2018	3:29
"I'm With You"	Mayday Parade	I'm With You (Single)		2019	4:03
"I Swear This Time I Mean It"	Mayday Parade	Anywhere but Here	David Bendeth	2009	4:01
"I'd Hate to Be You When People Find Out What This Song Is About"	Mayday Parade	A Lesson in Romantics	Zack Odom, Kenneth Mount	2007	4:01
"I'd Rather Make Mistakes Than Nothing at All"	Mayday Parade	Mayday Parade	Zack Odom, Kenneth Mount	2011	3:45
"If I Were You"	Mayday Parade	Sunnyland	Zack Odom, Kenneth Mount	2018	4:07
"If You Can't Live Without Me, Why Aren't You Dead Yet?"	Mayday Parade, Bobby Huff	Anywhere but Here	David Bendeth	2009	3:38
"If You Wanted a Song Written About You, All You Had to Do Was Ask"	Mayday Parade	A Lesson in Romantics	Zack Odom, Kenneth Mount	2007	4:04
"In My Head"	Jason Derulo, Claude Kelly, J. R. Rotem	Punk Goes Pop 3	–	2010	3:41
"Is Nowhere"	Mayday Parade	Sunnyland	Zack Odom, Kenneth Mount, John Feldmann, Howard Benson	2018	3:51
"It Is What It Is"	Mayday Parade	It Is What It Is (Single)	Zack Odom, Kenneth Mount	2020	4:01
"It's Hard to Be Religious When Certain People Are Never Incinerated by Bolts of Lightning"	Derek Sanders	Sunnyland	Zack Odom, Kenneth Mount, John Feldmann, Howard Benson	2018	3:22
"Jamie All Over" (Kid Named Chicago cover)	Mayday Parade	A Lesson in Romantics	Zack Odom, Kenneth Mount	2007	3:36
"Jamie All Over" (acoustic)	Kid Named Chicago	Valdosta (EP)	Lee Dyess	2011	4:03
"Jersey"	Mayday Parade	A Lesson in Romantics	Zack Odom, Kenneth Mount	2007	3:29
"Just Out of Reach"	Mayday Parade	Black Lines	Mike Sapone	2015	3:43
"Just Say You're Not into It"	Jason Lancaster, Mayday Parade	Tales Told by Dead Friends (EP)	Lee Dyess	2006	4:21
"Keep in Mind, Transmogrification Is a New Technology"	Mayday Parade	Black Lines	Mike Sapone	2015	5:27
"Kids in Love"	Mayday Parade, Gregg Wattenberg	Anywhere but Here	David Bendeth	2009	3:36
"Kids in Love" (acoustic)	Mayday Parade, Gregg Wattenberg	Valdosta (EP)	Lee Dyess	2011	3:48
"Last Night for a Table of Two"	Mayday Parade	Monsters in the Closet	Zack Odom, Kenneth Mount	2013	3:39
"Let's Be Honest"	Mayday Parade	Black Lines	Mike Sapone	2015	3:51
"Letting Go"	Mayday Parade	Black Lines	Mike Sapone	2015	3:50
"Look Up and See Infinity, Look Down and See Nothing"	Mayday Parade	Black Lines	Mike Sapone	2015	2:51
"Looks Red, Tastes Blue"	Mayday Parade	Sunnyland	Howard Benson	2018	4:14
"Miserable at Best"	Mayday Parade	A Lesson in Romantics	Zack Odom, Kenneth Mount	2007	5:20
"Narrow"	Mayday Parade	Black Lines	Mike Sapone	2015	3:07
"Never Sure"	Mayday Parade	Sunnyland	Zack Odom, Kenneth Mount, John Feldmann, Howard Benson	2018	3:55
"No Heroes Allowed"	Mayday Parade	Mayday Parade	Zack Odom, Kenneth Mount	2011	3:34
"Nothing You Can Live Without, Nothing You Can Do About"	Mayday Parade	Monsters in the Closet	Zack Odom, Kenneth Mount	2013	3:55
"Ocean and Atlantic"	Mayday Parade	A Lesson in Romantics	Zack Odom, Kenneth Mount	2007	3:29
"Oh Well, Oh Well"	Mayday Parade	Mayday Parade	Zack Odom, Kenneth Mount	2011	4:49
"Oh Well, Oh Well" (acoustic)^{[D]}	Mayday Parade	Mayday Parade	Zack Odom, Kenneth Mount	2011	4:43
"One Man Drinking Games"^{[B]}	Jason Lancaster, Mayday Parade	Tales Told by Dead Friends (EP)	Lee Dyess	2006	4:39
"One of Them Will Destroy the Other"	Mayday Parade	Black Lines	Mike Sapone	2015	3:10
"One of Us"	Mayday Parade	Black Lines	Mike Sapone	2015	4:27
"Piece of Your Heart"	Mayday Parade	Sunnyland	Zack Odom, Kenneth Mount	2018	3:40
"Priceless"	Mayday Parade	Mayday Parade	Zack Odom, Kenneth Mount	2011	3:18
"Repent and Repeat"	Mayday Parade	Monsters in the Closet	Zack Odom, Kenneth Mount	2013	2:54
"Satellite"	Mayday Parade	Sunnyland	Zack Odom, Kenneth Mount	2018	4:03
"Save Your Heart"	Mayday Parade, Bobby Huff	Anywhere but Here	David Bendeth	2009	3:42
"So Far Away"^{[C]}	–	Anywhere but Here	David Bendeth	2009	4:38
"Somebody That I Used to Know"	Wally de Backer	Punk Goes Pop 5	–	2012	3:24
"Sorry, Not Sorry"	Mayday Parade	Monsters in the Closet	Zack Odom, Kenneth Mount	2013	3:25
"Stay"	Mayday Parade	Mayday Parade	Zack Odom, Kenneth Mount	2011	3:34
"Stay the Same"	Mayday Parade	Sunnyland	Zack Odom, Kenneth Mount	2018	3:21
"Still Breathing"	Mayday Parade, Dave Bassett	Anywhere but Here	David Bendeth	2009	3:52
"Stuck in Remission"^{[E]}	Mayday Parade	Monsters in the Closet	Zack Odom, Kenneth Mount	2014	3:26
"Sunnyland"	Mayday Parade	Sunnyland	John Feldmann, Zack Odom, Kenneth Mount	2018	3:54
"Take My Breath Away"	Mayday Parade	Sunnyland	Zack Odom, Kenneth Mount, Howard Benson, John Feldmann	2018	3:55
"Take This to Heart"	Mayday Parade	A Lesson in Romantics	Zack Odom, Kenneth Mount	2007	4:07
"Terrible Things"	Mayday Parade	Valdosta (EP)	Lee Dyess	2011	3:58
"The End"	Mayday Parade	Anywhere but Here	David Bendeth	2009	3:37
"The Last Something That Meant Anything"	Jake Bundrick, Mayday Parade	Tales Told by Dead Friends (EP)	Lee Dyess	2006	5:39
"The Memory"^{[C]}	–	Anywhere but Here	David Bendeth	2009	4:10
"The Silence"	Mayday Parade, Bobby Huff	Anywhere but Here	David Bendeth	2009	3:35
"The Torment of Existence Weighed Against the Horror of Nonbeing"	Mayday Parade	Monsters in the Closet	Zack Odom, Kenneth Mount	2013	4:04
"Three Cheers for Five Years"	Jason Lancaster, Mayday Parade	Tales Told by Dead Friends (EP)	Lee Dyess	2006	4:53
"Three Cheers for Five Years" (acoustic)^{[A]}	Mayday Parade	A Lesson in Romantics	Zack Odom, Kenneth Mount	2008	4:40
"Underneath the Tide"	Mayday Parade	Black Lines	Mike Sapone	2015	2:51
"Until You're Big Enough"	Mayday Parade	Black Lines	Mike Sapone	2015	3:15
"Walk on Water or Drown"	Mayday Parade	A Lesson in Romantics	Zack Odom, Kenneth Mount	2007	3:29
"We Are the Champions"	Freddie Mercury	Punk Goes Classic Rock	–	2010	3:14
"When I Get Home, You're So Dead"	Jason Lancaster, Mayday Parade	Tales Told by Dead Friends (EP)	Lee Dyess	2006	3:29
"When I Get Home, You're So Dead"	Mayday Parade	A Lesson in Romantics	Zack Odom, Kenneth Mount	2007	3:13
"When I Grow Up"	Rodney "Darkchild" Jerkins, Theron Thomas, Timothy Thomas, Jim McCarty, Paul Samwell-Smith	Punk Goes Pop 2	–	2009	3:38
"When You See My Friends"	Mayday Parade	Mayday Parade	Zack Odom, Kenneth Mount	2011	3:34
"When You See My Friends" (acoustic)^{[D]}	Mayday Parade	Mayday Parade	Zack Odom, Kenneth Mount	2011	3:25
"Where You Are"	Mayday Parade	Sunnyland	Zack Odom, Kenneth Mount	2018	3:48
"Without the Bitter the Sweet Isn't as Sweet"	Mayday Parade	Mayday Parade	Zack Odom, Kenneth Mount	2011	3:32
"Worth a Thousand Words"^{[E]}	Mayday Parade	Monsters in the Closet	Zack Odom, Kenneth Mount	2014	3:42
"You Be the Anchor That Keeps My Feet on the Ground, I'll Be the Wings That Keep Your Heart in the Clouds"	Mayday Parade	A Lesson in Romantics	Zack Odom, Kenneth Mount	2007	4:40
"You're Dead Wrong"	Mayday Parade	Mayday Parade	Zack Odom, Kenneth Mount	2011	3:59
"Your Song"	Jason Lancaster, Mayday Parade	Tales Told by Dead Friends (EP)	Lee Dyess	2006	3:57
"Your Song" (acoustic)	Mayday Parade, Jason Lancaster	Valdosta (EP)	Lee Dyess	2011	4:09
