= Monsters in the Closet =

Monsters in the Closet may refer to:

- Monsters in the Closet (Mayday Parade album), 2013
- Monsters in the Closet (Swollen Members album), 2002
- Monsters in the Closet: Homosexuality and the Horror Film, a book by Harry Benshoff
- Monsters in the Closet, a Nilus the Sandman television special

== See also ==
- Monster in the Closet, a 1986 film
