= Miserable at Best =

Song by Mayday Parade

from the album A Lesson in Romantics
- A-side: "Jamie All Over"
- Studio: Tree Sound Studios (Atlanta, Georgia)
- Genre: Emo
- Length: 5:16
- Label: Fearless
- Songwriters: Jason Lancaster; Derek Sanders; Jeremy Lenzo; Alex Garcia; Jake Bundrick; Brooks Betts
- Producers: Zack Odom; Kenneth Mount

Music video
- "Miserable at Best" on YouTube

"Miserable at Best" is a song by American rock band Mayday Parade from their debut studio album, A Lesson in Romantics (2007). It was written by members of the group and former member Jason Lancaster. The song was certified gold by the Recording Industry Association of America on December 14, 2017.

== Background and composition ==
"Miserable at Best" was written by Jason Lancaster, Derek Sanders, Jeremy Lenzo, Alex Garcia, Jake Bundrick and Brooks Betts, while production was handled by Zack Odom and Kenneth Mount. The "piano-driven" track runs at 72 BPM and is in the key of D major. According to the sheet music published at Musicnotes.com, by Alfred Music Publishing, vocalist Derek Sanders' range in the song spans from the notes F♯2 – D4.

One of the band's more personal songs, it is one of a few songs that specifically name people. In an interview with Staten Island Advance, Sanders stated, "sometimes I wonder if that's too personal, to actually go and say the name of the person, but I think all in all, I don't regret it, you know, I think it's good that way." It is about "the emotional journey that a person goes through when they breakup with a loved one." In March 2019, a vinyl edition of "Jamie All Over" was released, with "Miserable at Best" serving as the B-side.

== Critical reception ==
MTV described the song as, "a gut-wrenching break-up ballad with no punches pulled" and compared the song and music video to Counting Crows's 1996 song, "A Long December". Alternative Press ranked the song at number one on their "10 Best Mayday Parade Songs", writing, "'Mayday Parade Ballads' could be an entire listicle unto itself, and this heartfelt epic is the one that cemented the band's reputation [...] It's Mayday Parade at their swoonworthy best."

== Music video ==
The music video for "Miserable at Best" was released on January 9, 2009, and was directed by Mark Staubach. According to Staubach, he wanted to make a video that is relatable to everyone and to capture the emotions and feelings within the video. Sanders also added, "We all agreed we wanted to make a video that expressed our feelings and lyrics visually. The song is pretty heart-wrenching and we wanted to portray that feeling of heartbreak and a loss."

Because Lancaster had already departed the band at the time of the video's making, he does not appear in it, with drummer Jake Bundrick lipsyncing over his vocals instead.

== Track listing ==
7" vinyl
No.	Title	Length
1.	"Jamie All Over"	3:36
2.	"Miserable at Best"	5:16

== Credits and personnel ==
Credits for "Miserable at Best" adapted from album's liner notes.

Mayday Parade

- Derek Sanders – lead vocals, piano

Additional musicians

- Jason Lancaster – co-lead vocals

Production

- Zack Odom – producer
- Kenneth Mount – producer
- Mark Needham – mixing
- Steve Hall – mastering

== Certifications ==
Certifications for "Miserable at Best"
Region	Certification	Certified units/sales
United States (RIAA)	Gold	500,000^{‡}
^{‡} Sales+streaming figures based on certification alone.
