= Valdosta (EP) =

EP by Mayday Parade
- Released: March 8, 2011
- Recorded: 2010
- Genres: Acoustic rock; alternative rock
- Length: 23:22
- Labels: Fearless; Atlantic
- Producer: Lee Dyess

Mayday Parade chronology
Anywhere but Here (2009)	Valdosta (2011)	Mayday Parade (2011)

Valdosta is an acoustic EP by American rock band Mayday Parade. The EP was released on March 8, 2011, via Fearless and Atlantic Records.

== Background and release ==
Valdosta was named after Valdosta, Georgia, the town that the band used to record their early material in. "Terrible Things" was released for streaming on February 22, 2011. The EP was released by Atlantic and Fearless on March 8. The cover art for Valdosta was originally going to feature peaches and azaleas to represent the city, inspired by an advertisement painting of old fruit cakes. However, it was changed to a sketch of a woman's face.

== Composition ==
"Jamie All Over" was originally a song by Kid Named Chicago, the previous band of Jake Bundrick, Alex Garcia, and Jason Lancaster. It was later re-recorded on Mayday Parade's debut album A Lesson in Romantics. Both "Kids in Love" and "Bruised and Scarred" appeared on Mayday Parade's second studio album, Anywhere but Here. "Your Song" is from Mayday Parade's debut EP, Tales Told by Dead Friends. Jake Bundrick sings all of the parts originally sung by Jason Lancaster. "Amber Lynn" and "Terrible Things" were both new songs.

== Reception ==
Professional ratings
Review scores
Source	Rating
AbsolutePunk	(80%)
Alternative Press	3/5 stars
Sputnikmusic	3.5/5

Valdosta was met with mixed reviews from music critics. Brendan Manley of Alternative Press gave a mixed review for the EP. He described the first track, "Amber Lynn" as a "smooth stretch of highway, with folk-country guitars, pedal steel and strings," while stating that the last track, "Terrible Things", continues "Mayday Parade's penchant overblown piano ballads, without evoking the gag reflex." He praised Derek Sanders' vocals and stated that the alternate takes of "Kids in Love" and "Bruised And Scarred" were "arguably better than the originals." However, he criticized the redos of "Jamie All Over" and "Your Song", noting that drummer Jake Bundrick and bassist Jeremy Lenzo sounding "fairly comical trying to replicate Lancaster." He ended off the review stating, "If the band can write more material as good as these two new cuts, and can increasingly stand on their own creations, there might just be a reason to listen to the next MP record. If not, the Lancaster karaoke will eventually run its course."

Kiel Hauck of PopMatters also gave a mixed review for the EP. He remarked, "'Amber Lynn', is catchy enough, pairing up a nice melody with improved songwriting from vocalist Derek Sanders. 'Terrible Things' finds the band playing a sad piano ballad very much in the same vein as its popular track 'Miserable at Best'." However, he believed that the acoustic remakes of "Kids in Love" and "Bruised and Scarred" felt "forced than natural." He ended off stating, "this EP lies in the sound of the two new tracks, which show a lot of promise, especially in the vocal performances of Sanders [...] If nothing else, Valdosta should be enough to hold over fans until the new album is released."

Sputnikmusic stated, "It may be a stretch to suggest that Mayday Parade sound rejuvenated here on Valdosta, but it could be exactly the venture which was required to give the band a reality check of sorts. Vocally, melodically and lyrically forced to resort to a bare bones framework, there is little place to hide behind noise and gimmicks."

Reception from both fans and critics have been mainly positive, except for long-term fans who were unwilling to accept the band's current sound. In response to the negative feedback, guitarist Brooks Betts stated, "At this point, it's tedious. I couldn't care less about what people think of the music when they compare it to the earlier stuff [...] At the end of the day, you can't worry about it. People get over it. Things change. I think these new tracks are great and I hope people like it."

== Track listing ==
All tracks are written by Mayday Parade except where noted.

No.	Title	Writer(s)	Length
1.	"Amber Lynn"		3:53
2.	"Jamie All Over"	Derek Sanders; Alex Garcia; Jeremy Lenzo; Brooks Betts; Jake Bundrick; Jason Lancaster	4:03
3.	"Kids in Love"	Sanders; Garcia; Lenzo; Betts; Bundrick; Gregg Wattenberg	3:48
4.	"Your Song"	Sanders; Garcia; Lenzo; Betts; Bundrick; Lancaster	4:09
5.	"Bruised and Scarred"	Sanders; Garcia; Lenzo; Betts; Bundrick; Bobby Huff; David Bendeth	3:22
6.	"Terrible Things"		3:58
Total length:			23:22

== Personnel ==
Credits for Valdosta adapted from AllMusic.

Mayday Parade

- Derek Sanders – lead vocals, keyboard
- Jake Bundrick – vocals, drums
- Alex Garcia – lead guitar
- Brooks Betts – rhythm guitar
- Jeremy Lenzo – bass guitar, vocals

Additional musicians

- Daniel Lancaster – vocals
- Lee Dyess – cello

Production

- Mayday Parade – engineering
- Anne Declemente – A&R
- Bobby Huff – composer
- Brett Bair – management
- Chris Foitle – A&R
- Darlene Johnson – management
- David Bendeth – composer
- David Rawson – management
- Gregg Wattenberg – composer
- Jason Lancaster – composer
- Jerrod Landon Porter – design
- Katie Brown – marketing
- Lee Dyess – engineering, mixing, producer
- Michelle Piza – package manager
- Tal Miller – mastering

== Charts ==
Chart performance for Valdosta
Chart (2011)	Peak position
US Billboard 200	127
US Top Alternative Albums (Billboard)	19
US Top Rock Albums (Billboard)	30
