= Mayday Parade (album) =

Studio album by Mayday Parade
- Released: October 4, 2011
- Recorded: February 24 – April 17, 2011; Vinatage Song Studio, Alpharetta, Georgia; Tree Sound Studios, Norcross, Georgia
- Genres: Pop-punk; pop rock; emo
- Length: 45:24
- Labels: ILG; Fearless; MDP
- Producers: Zack Odom; Kenneth Mount

Mayday Parade chronology
Valdosta (2011)	Mayday Parade (2011)	Monsters in the Closet (2013)

Singles from Mayday Parade
- 1. "Oh Well, Oh Well" Released: August 1, 2011; 2. "When You See My Friends" Released: September 9, 2011

Mayday Parade is the third studio album by American rock band Mayday Parade. It was released by Fearless on October 4, 2011. It was also released through Independent Label Group, after the band departed Atlantic Records. Produced by Zack Odom and Kenneth Mount, the album sees the band writing all the material again, compared to their previous album Anywhere but Here (2009).

The album debuted at number 12 on the U.S. Billboard 200, selling near to 27,000 copies in its first week, becoming the band's second highest charted album to date. It also reached number four on the US Top Alternative Albums and number five on the US Top Rock Albums charts.

== Background and production ==
In March 2009, it was announced Mayday Parade had signed to Atlantic. While working on their major label debut, Anywhere but Here (2009), Atlantic expected the band to make a pop album. While the band attempted to follow this direction, they were weighed down by "so much overbearing pressure", according to guitarist Brooks Betts. Vocalist Derek Sanders later recalled that "there was a lot of outside influence" from Atlantic that resulted in "a lot of co-writes". In retrospect, Sanders said the band simply recorded songs that they "didn't care about as much or love as much". Brooks pointed out that it wasn't "the best representation [of the band]."

The album was written by the band during early 2011, at a beach house in Panacea, Florida. For this album, the band wrote all of the material. "Stay" is about pain experienced when losing a loved one. The album was recorded over the course of two months, they began recording with Zack Odom and Kenneth Mount in February, and the record was reportedly completed "[the band's] way," not "someone else's way," on April 18. Recording took place at Vinatage Song Studio in Alpharetta, Georgia and at Tree Sound Studios in Norcross, Georgia. Sanders said the band "pushed themselves outside of their typical boundaries," creatively expanding on the instrumentals. The group brought in a string section for certain tracks. He also spoke about doing the process their way, stating, "I think we've found the perfect formula for how to do it. We'll probably do the same thing in the future — it'll be us in a beach house in Florida for about a month and write most of the album there [...] getting away from everything and having no distractions."

The album's artwork was created by Jerrod Landon Porter and the CD booklet features an eight panel comic book.

== Release ==
On July 6, 2011, Mayday Parade was announced for release and the track listing was revealed. In July and August, the band supported All Time Low on their North America tour. "Oh Well, Oh Well" was made available for streaming via Alternative Press on July 27. On July 31, the artwork was revealed. "Oh Well, Oh Well" was released as a single on August 1. On September 8, "When You See My Friends" was made available for streaming via MTV, and was released as a single a day later. Short clips of every song on the album were made available for steaming on September 22. On October 3, Mayday Parade was made available for streaming, and was released a day later through ILG. On October 7, a music video was released for "Oh Well, Oh Well", which was directed by Thunder Down Country. In October and November, the band went on The Noise Tour with support from We Are the in Crowd, There for Tomorrow, You Me at Six, The Make and Sparks the Rescue.

In January 2012, the band filmed a music video for "Stay" in Ohio. In February and March, the band went on a co-headlining tour with We the Kings, with support from The Downtown Fiction and Anarbor. The band supported You Me at Six on their tour of the UK in March and April. On April 4, the "Stay" music video was released, which was directed by Thunder Down Country. On April 12, the band released an acoustic version of "When You See My Friends" as a free download. The band went on the 2012 edition of Warped Tour. In early June, the band toured Japan on the 2012 edition of the Beyond [The] Blue tour. In September, the group performed at the Bazooka Rocks Festival in the Philippines, along with The Maine, Forever the Sickest Kids, The Pretty Reckless, A Skylit Drive and Marianas Trench. The band went on co-headlining tour with The Maine, with support from The Postelles, in October and November. In December, the band went on a short Australian tour with We Are the in Crowd and Heroes for Hire. On December 4, the band released a live music video for "When You See My Friends".

== Reception ==
Professional ratings
Review scores
Source	Rating
AbsolutePunk	70%
AllMusic	3/5 stars
Alter the Press!	4.5/5 stars
Alternative Addiction	3.5/5 stars
Melodic	3.5/5 stars
The Music	4/5 stars
Rockfreaks.net	6.5/10 stars
Sputnikmusic	4/5

'Mayday Parade was met with positive reviews from music critics. Many critics praised the songwriting on the album, which had been written by the band, compared to Anywhere but Here, their previous album. Jason Lymangrover of AllMusic said, "The most notable change is that the songs on their third outing were written solely by the band. However, with the same production team behind their sound, the same bouncy four-chord blueprint, and the same prevalence for soft verses vs. loud choruses, the changes behind the curtain are barely noticeable." Alternative Addiction wrote, "Mayday Parade going independent allowed them to be able to write all of their own material again. That's something that fits best with what they do. Because of this, the songs sound more appropriate to what the band does well. It doesn't feel like they're trying to do something they're not capable of." Pär Winberg of Melodic felt that it was their "best album to date," stating, "you can't be anything else than impressed by the band who penned all the tracks themselves." Writing for Sputnikmusic, Davey Boy stated, "While the choruses here are all made for being easily recited en masse, they are strangely not as instantly infectious as some of the band's past work. Promisingly, this is more a sign of improved song-craft which gives this album greater replay value than its predecessor Anywhere But Here." A staff writer from The Music remarked, "With their third full length, Mayday Parade has definitely returned to form. They have left behind all the big technical production elements that hindered their last release and have taken it back to basics, showing fans what they do best by creating a solid pop rock album full of massive hooks played out through back and forth dual vocals and upbeat instrument lines."

The album was ranked at number 4 on PopMatters' best pop punk releases of 2011 list. Reflecting on the album, Derek Sanders described it as "a big turning point for the band." With the first two albums, he said the band "hadn't planted our roots yet," though by the third album, "we knew exactly what we wanted and who we were as a band. Everything fell into place; it was the right time, the right songs and when I think back over all our records, it's the one that really stands out for me."

== Commercial performance ==
Mayday Parade was projected to sell 25,000 copies, it eventually sold near to 27,000 copies in the first week, an increase of 30% over their previous album's first week sales. The album debuted at number 12 on the Billboard 200. "Stay" charted at number 26 on the Rock Digital Songs chart in the U.S. The album has sold over 100,000 copies in the US as of 2014.

== Track listing ==
All tracks are written by Mayday Parade

No.	Title	Length
1.	"Oh Well, Oh Well"	4:49
2.	"No Heroes Allowed"	3:34
3.	"When You See My Friends"	3:34
4.	"You're Dead Wrong"	3:59
5.	"Priceless"	3:18
6.	"Stay"	3:34
7.	"Call Me Hopeless, Not Romantic"	3:29
8.	"A Shot Across the Bow"	3:45
9.	"Everything's an Illusion"	3:27
10.	"I'd Rather Make Mistakes Than Nothing at All"	3:45
11.	"Without the Bitter the Sweet Isn't as Sweet"	3:32
12.	"Happy Endings Are Stories That Haven't Ended Yet"	4:38
Total length:		45:24

Bonus tracks

iTunes deluxe edition bonus tracks
No.	Title	Length
13.	"When You See My Friends" (acoustic)	3:25
14.	"Oh Well, Oh Well" (acoustic)	4:43
Total length:		53:32

Japanese edition bonus tracks (Note: Both tracks taken from Valdosta (2011).)
No.	Title	Length
13.	"Jamie All Over" (acoustic)	4:03
14.	"Your Song" (acoustic)	4:10
Total length:		53:37

== Personnel ==
Personnel per digital booklet.

Mayday Parade

- Derek Sanders – lead vocals, keyboards
- Alex Garcia – lead guitar
- Brooks Betts – rhythm guitar
- Jeremy Lenzo – bass guitar, vocals
- Jake Bundrick – drums, vocals

Additional musicians

- Chris Barry – choral arrangements
- Chris Barry, Jennie Barry, Andy Barry, Anne Lokey – choir
- Zack Odom – string arrangements, viola
- Seth Mann – 1st and 2nd violin
- Gail Burnett – cello
- Kenneth (G) Mount – trumpet

Production

- Zack Odom, Kenneth Mount – producers, recording
- Chad McCure – 2nd engineer drum tracking
- Daniel Korneff – mixing
- UE Nastasi – mastering
- Jerrod Landon Porter – illustration & design

== Charts ==
Chart performance for Mayday Parade
Chart (2011)	Peak position
Australian Albums (ARIA)	84
UK Album Downloads (Official Charts)	86
US Billboard 200	12
US Top Alternative Albums (Billboard)	4
US Independent Albums (Billboard)	2
US Tastemaker Albums (Billboard)	3
US Top Rock Albums (Billboard)	5
