= Out of Here (EP) =

EP by Mayday Parade
- Released: October 16, 2020
- Recorded: March 2020
- Genre: Emo
- Length: 10:35
- Label: Rise
- Producers: Kenneth Mount; Zack Odom

Mayday Parade chronology
Sunnyland (2018)	Out of Here (2020)	What It Means to Fall Apart (2021)

Singles from Out of Here
- 1. "Lighten Up Kid" Released: September 24, 2020

Out of Here is an EP by American rock band Mayday Parade. The EP was released on October 6, 2020 via Rise Records.

== Background and release ==
Out of Here follows the theme of their previous album, Sunnyland, in that of exploring the ideas of hope and self-worth. According to guitarist Brooks Betts, the EP deals with current world and climate issues. He stated, "I think Out of Here represents all of the three songs in the sense that we want things to move along and get to a better place. That's the feeling that we are trying to convey with this EP."

On September 24, 2020, the group announced that they would be releasing the Out of Here EP on October 16, via Rise Records. Along with this announcement, the band released the EP's lead single, "Lighten Up Kid". Drummer Jake Bundrick stated that the song is "about trying to find yourself and the strength to keep fighting for what you believe in." On October 16, the band premiered the music video for "First Train". The video was directed by Scott Hansen and features actor J. Gaven Wilde. Lead vocalist Derek Sanders stated that the song is "about not getting weighed down by the negative things in your life." "First Train" peaked at number 17 on the UK Physical Singles Chart. A music video for the final track, "I Can Only Hope", was released on November 18.

== Composition ==
The group recorded the EP in March 2020, working with producers Kenneth Mount and Zack Odom. Lyrics of the songs push a message of hope and moving on, while having a fairly upbeat and energetic sound. The track, "I Can Only Hope", deals with the loss and pain of someone, which came from a personal place for Bundrick. The song is about his father who had some medical issues, where Bundrick felt so far away from where his father was. He stated, "The song is about being terrified. It's about that uncertainty whether someone will pull through something so difficult."

== Reception ==
Professional ratings
Review scores
Source	Rating
Hardbeat	8/10 stars
Kerrang!	3/5 stars

Out of Here was met with positive reviews from music critics. Kevin Lay of Hardbeat stated that the EP, "restores a splash of colour, a hint of sweetness, and a sea of warmth, when it's never been more needed." He added that the EP, "gives us hope that when normality returns there are some killer live shows awaiting us where we can raise our beer in the air and pour our hearts out in a crowded room of strangers." Mischa Pearlman of Kerrang! remarked, "It all makes for a more than decent addition to the band's catalogue, and shows they're still able to write songs that sound fresh and invigorating. It won't change the world, but as the world continues to fall apart, Mayday Parade do offer a welcome slice of optimism."

== Track listing ==
All tracks are written by Mayday Parade.

No.	Title	Length
1.	"First Train"	3:34
2.	"Lighten Up Kid"	3:38
3.	"I Can Only Hope"	3:23
Total length:		10:35

== Personnel ==
Credits for Out of Here adapted from AllMusic.

Mayday Parade

- Derek Sanders – lead vocals, piano, guitar
- Jake Bundrick – drums, vocals
- Alex Garcia – lead guitar
- Brooks Betts – rhythm guitar
- Jeremy Lenzo – bass guitar, backing vocals

Production

- Kenneth Mount – producer, engineering
- Zack odom – producer, engineering
- Michael Hanson – composer

== Release history ==
Release formats for Out of Here
Region	Date	Format(s)	Label	Ref.
Various	October 16, 2020	Digital download; vinyl	Rise Records	
