= Sweet (Mayday Parade EP) =

EP by Mayday Parade
- Released: April 18, 2025
- Studios: Tree Sound (Norcross); ZK Productions (Johns Creek)
- Genres: Pop rock; pop-punk
- Length: 23:50
- Label: Many Hats Endeavors
- Producers: Zack Odom; Kenneth Mount

Mayday Parade chronology
What It Means to Fall Apart (2021)	Sweet (2025)	Sad (2025)

Singles from Sweet
- 1. "Pretty Good to Feel Something" Released: July 11, 2024; 2. "By the Way" Released: January 8, 2025; 3. "Towards You" Released: February 27, 2025

Sweet is the fourth EP by American rock band Mayday Parade. It was released on April 18, 2025, via Many Hats Endeavors. It is the first installment of a three-part album and is supported by three singles: "Pretty Good to Feel Something", "By the Way" and "Towards You".

== Background ==
In January 2025, the group announced a three-part album with the first installment, Sweet, released on April 18, 2025. This was not the original idea, however, when the band went to record their seventh studio album What It Means to Fall Apart, their 20th anniversary was coming up and it inspired the band to change directions. Lead vocalist Derek Sanders stated, "We just thought, 'What if we tried to do something bigger and more grand?.' It's kind of an experiment and feels like the right time to try something like this."

The album was produced by Zack Odom and Kenneth Mount. It was released independently through Many Hats Endeavors. Bassist Jeremy Lenzo felt that becoming an independent group allowed them to release new music consistently and go into "the mindset that each song really needs to stand on its own."

== Composition ==
Sweet is described as pop rock and pop-punk. Drummer Jake Bundrick stated they wanted to incorporate new elements on the album, whilst going back to the sound fans know and "love about us." The lead track "By the Way" takes influences from Third Eye Blind, while "4,000 Days Plus the Ones I Don't Remember" and "Who's Laughing Now?" are pop punk tracks, which Sanders described as "the most pop punk we've ever gone before." The latter features Joe Taylor of Knuckle Puck. The final track "Pretty Good to Feel Something" is emo-pop track about the highs and lows of the aftermath of a breakup. "Towards You" and "Who We Are" showcase a softer side to the album and is described as pop rock.

== Release ==
On July 11, 2024, the group released the album's lead single "Pretty Good to Feel Something". On January 8, 2025, the group released the second single from the album "By the Way". The album's third single "Towards You" was released on February 27. The album was officially released on April 18, and on that same day the group released a music video for "Who's Laughing Now", featuring Knuckle Puck. The group embarked on the Three Cheers for 20 Years, to celebrate the release of their debut EP, Tales Told by Dead Friends, while also performing songs from their new album. The group is joined by Microwave, Grayscale, and Like Roses. The tour expanded to Australia with dates announced for September 2025 with Jack's Mannequin and The Home Team.

== Track listing ==
All tracks are written by Mayday Parade.

No.	Title	Length
1.	"By the Way"	2:52
2.	"4,000 Days Plus the Ones I Don't Remember"	3:52
3.	"Who's Laughing Now" (featuring Knuckle Puck)	3:55
4.	"This Personified"	0:21
5.	"Who We Are"	2:58
6.	"Natural"	3:42
7.	"Towards You"	3:41
8.	"Pretty Good to Feel Something"	3:06
Total length:		23:50

== Personnel ==
Credits for Sweet adapted from the album's liner notes.

=== Mayday Parade ===
- Derek Sanders – lead vocals, keyboards, string arrangements
- Alex Garcia – lead guitar
- Brooks Betts – rhythm guitar
- Jeremy Lenzo – bass guitar, vocals
- Jake Bundrick – drums, vocals

=== Additional contributors ===
- Zack Odom – production, recording, string arrangement on "Towards You"
- Kenneth Mount – production, recording, string arrangement on "Towards You"
- Vince Ratti – mixing
- Brad Blackwood – mastering
- Erik Pedersen – assistant engineering
- The Budapest Scoring Orchestra – strings on "Towards You"
- Benjamin Lieber – art, creative direction
- Kelsey Bradley – floral arrangements

== Charts ==
Chart performance for Sweet
Chart (2025)	Peak position
UK Album Downloads (Official Charts)	98
UK Independent Albums (OCC)	38
