= When I Get Home, You're So Dead =

Single by Mayday Parade

from the album A Lesson in Romantics
- Released: December 3, 2007
- Studio: Tree Sound Studios (Atlanta, Georgia)
- Length: 3:13
- Label: Fearless
- Songwriters: Jason Lancaster; Derek Sanders; Jeremy Lenzo; Alex Garcia; Jake Bundrick; Brooks Betts
- Producers: Zack Odom; Kenneth Mount

Mayday Parade singles chronology
| "When I Get Home, You're So Dead" (2007) | "Jamie All Over" (2008) |

Music video
- "When I Get Home, You're So Dead" on YouTube

"When I Get Home, You're So Dead" is a song by American rock band Mayday Parade. It is the group's debut single and was released on December 3, 2007, as the lead single from their debut studio album, A Lesson in Romantics.

== Background ==
"When I Get Home, You're So Dead" premiered on the band's Myspace page on June 6, 2007. It was later released as the lead single from A Lesson in Romantics on December 3, 2007. The song originally was not intended to be on the album before Fearless Records encouraged the group to have it on the record. Lead vocalist Derek Sanders recalled, "I don't think that was something that we would have done. But Fearless really wanted us to do that." The song is about, "the anger the band fostered."

== Composition and recording ==
"When I Get Home, You're So Dead" was written by Jason Lancaster, Derek Sanders, Jeremy Lenzo, Alex Garcia, Jake Bundrick and Brooks Betts, while production was handled by Zack Odom and Kenneth Mount. The track runs at 146 BPM and is in the key of A minor.

The song's lyrics deal with anger and domestic violence.

The track was one of the first songs the band had ever wrote. It appeared on their debut EP, Tales Told by Dead Friends, recorded at the Earthsound Recording Studio in Valdosta, Georgia. It was re-recorded for their debut studio album at Tree Sound Studios in Atlanta, Georgia. Speaking about why the group chose to re-record the track with AbsolutePunk, the band stated, "When I get home was a song that got a great response from people all over the country so we decided to have that on the album so that kids could rock out to a new version [...] we love playing that song, it's so energetic and a crowd favorite and we didn't want to stop playing it when the new CD came out."

== Critical reception ==
New York Post stated that the song is, "the ultimate reminder that sometimes girls make boys cry, too." Joe DeAndrea of AbsolutePunk stated that the re-recorded version of "When I Get Home, You're So Dead" was "clearly better" than the original one that appeared on their debut EP.

== Music video ==
The music video for "When I Get Home, You're So Dead" was directed by Marco de la Torre and was shot in September 2007. The music video premiered on November 14, 2007. In 2008, the music video was nominated for two MTV Video Music Awards for Best Rock Video and Video of the Year.

== Accolades ==
Accolades for "When I Get Home, You're So Dead"
| Publication | Country | Accolade | Year | Rank | Ref. |
|---|---|---|---|---|---|
| New York Post | United States | "Best Songs to Download" | 2007 | 194 | |

== Credits and personnel ==
Mayday Parade

- Derek Sanders – lead vocals
- Jeremy Lenzo – bass guitar, backing vocals
- Alex Garcia – lead guitar
- Brooks Betts – rhythm guitar
- Jake Bundrick – drums, backing vocals

Additional musicians

- Jason Lancaster – co-lead vocals and guitar

Production

- Zack Odom – producer
- Kenneth Mount – producer
- Mark Needham – mixing
- Steve Hall – mastering

== Release history ==
Release history for "When I Get Home, You're So Dead"
| Region | Date | Format | Label | Ref. |
|---|---|---|---|---|
| Various | December 3, 2007 | Digital download | Fearless | |
