= Sunnyland (Mayday Parade album) =

Studio album by Mayday Parade
- Released: June 15, 2018
- Studio: Foxy Studios, Calabasas, CA; Screaming Eagle Studios, Johns Creek, GA; Tree Sound Studios, Norcross, GA; West Valley Recording Studios, Woodland Hills, CA
- Genre: Pop-punk; emo
- Length: 49:16
- Label: Rise
- Producer: Howard Benson; John Feldmann; Kenneth Mount; Zack Odom

Mayday Parade chronology
Black Lines (2015)	Sunnyland (2018)	Out of Here (2020)

Singles from Sunnyland
- 1. "Piece of Your Heart" Released: May 3, 2018; 2. "It's Hard to be Religious When Certain People Aren't Incinerated by Bolts of Lightning" Released: June 1, 2018; 3. "Stay the Same" Released: June 6, 2018

Sunnyland is the sixth studio album by American rock band Mayday Parade, released on June 15, 2018.

== Background ==
In 2016, the group embarked on an anniversary tour for their Tales Told by Dead Friends (2006) EP, and later for their debut album A Lesson in Romantics (2007) in 2017.

== Release ==
On April 11, 2018, the group announced they had signed to Rise Records. On May 3, Sunnyland was announced for release the following month. Alongside the announcement, a music video was released for "Piece of Your Heart", directed by Miguel Barbosa. On May 15, a lyric video was released for "Never Sure". On May 31, a music video was released for "It's Hard to Be Religious When Certain People Are Never Incinerated by Bolts of Lightning", directed by Miguel Barbosa. Sunnyland was released on June 15. The album was promoted with the band's appearance on the 2018 Warped Tour between June and August. An acoustic video of "Piece of Your Heart" was released on September 25. In October and November, the group went on a headlining US tour, with support from This Wild Life, William Ryan Key and Oh, Weatherly.

In January 2019, the band performed at 8123 Fest. On April 18, a music video was released for "Never Sure". On May 29, a music video was released for "Looks Red, Tastes Blue", directed by Marlon Brandope. In July and August, the band performed at the Sad Summer Fest; in-between dates of the tour, the band held co-headlining shows with State Champs, with support from Mom Jeans and Just Friends. Later in August, they appeared at the Reading and Leeds Festivals.

== Critical reception ==
Professional ratings
Review scores
Source	Rating
Wall of Sound	6/10

Sunnyland was met with generally positive reviews from music critics. Hannah Adamson of Melodic called the record, "a blend of previous albums and has songs that vary along all ends of the Mayday gamut." She praised tracks such as "Piece of Your Heart", "Always Leaving" and "Take My Breath Away" as songs that "sound like classic Mayday Parade." However, she was critical for the group's lack of versatile sound stating, "Mayday Parade is not departing from their typical sound quite enough, and appear to constantly be putting out different versions of the same thing."

Wall of Sound remarked, "The track list is amazing as it boasts songs with all different styles and it’s definitely not bland or boring in the slightest." They called "Take My Breath Away" as the standout track describing it as "raw, stripped back and packed full of emotion." Other tracks such as "Satellite" was praised for its "upbeat and fun sound with catchy lyrics."

== Track listing ==
Sunnyland
No.	Title	Length
1.	"Never Sure"	3:54
2.	"It's Hard to Be Religious When Certain People Are Never Incinerated by Bolts of Lightning"	3:22
3.	"Piece of Your Heart"	3:39
4.	"Is Nowhere"	3:51
5.	"Take My Breath Away"	3:55
6.	"Stay the Same"	3:21
7.	"How Do You Like Me Now"	3:29
8.	"Where You Are"	3:48
9.	"If I Were You"	4:06
10.	"Satellite"	4:03
11.	"Looks Red, Tastes Blue"	4:14
12.	"Always Leaving"	3:41
13.	"Sunnyland"	3:53
Total length:		49:16

Sunnyland B-Sides
No.	Title	Length
1.	"It's Hard to Be Religious When Certain People Are Never Incinerated by Bolts of Lightning (Acoustic)"	3:29
2.	"Turn My Back"	3:33
Total length:		7:02

== Personnel ==
Credits for Sunnyland adapted from AllMusic.

Mayday Parade

- Derek Sanders – lead vocals, keyboards
- Alex Garcia – lead guitar
- Brooks Betts – rhythm guitar
- Jeremy Lenzo – bass guitar, vocals
- Jake Bundrick – drums, vocals

Production

- Alan Ashcraft – creative director
- Jack Bartlett – assistant engineering
- Howard Benson – producer
- Brian Burnham – studio assistant
- Zakk Cervini – additional production, engineering
- Adam Chagnon – engineering
- Zach Darf – assistant engineering
- Paul DeCarli – digital editing
- Trevor Dietrich – assistant engineering
- John Feldmann – producer
- Matthew Gordner – A&R
- Hatsukazu "Hatch" Inagaki – engineering
- Ted Jensen – mastering
- Nik Karpen – mixing assistant
- Jeremy Lenzo – photography
- Chris Lord-Alge – mixing
- Kevin Moore – art direction, design
- Kenneth Mount – engineering, producer
- Jon Nicholson – drum technician
- Zack Odom – engineering, pedal steel, producer
- Matt Pauling – additional production, engineering
- Rafel Smolen – mixing assistant

== Charts ==
Chart (2018)	Peak position
Australian Albums (ARIA)	91
New Zealand Heatseeker Albums (RMNZ)	8
UK Independent Albums (OCC)	32
UK Rock & Metal Albums (OCC)	18
US Billboard 200	104
