= Ghosts (Mayday Parade song) =

Single by Mayday Parade

from the album Monsters in the Closet
- Released: August 27, 2013
- Genre: Pop punk
- Length: 4:40
- Label: Fearless
- Songwriters: Derek Sanders; Jeremy Lenzo; Alex Garcia; Jake Bundrick; Brooks Betts
- Producers: Zack Odom; Kenneth Mount

Mayday Parade singles chronology
"Somebody That I Used to Know" (2012)	"Ghosts" (2013)	"Girls" (2013)

Music video
- "Ghosts" on YouTube

"Ghosts" is a song by American rock band Mayday Parade. The song was released on August 27, 2013, as the lead single from their third studio album, Monsters in the Closet.

== Background ==
On August 16, 2013, the band released the cover art for "Ghosts". On August 24, 2013, the group released a 30-second snippet of the track via Twitter. Bassist Jeremy Lenzo spoke about the meaning of the song stating, "This song has to do with your inner demons, and it portrays that in a literal sense by referring to them as ghosts and how they are always with you."

== Composition ==
The song was written by members of the band and produced by Zack Odom and Kenneth Mount. According to the sheet music published at Musicnotes.com, by Alfred Music Publishing, the track runs at 153 BPM and is in the key of C major. Lead vocalist Derek Sander's range in the song spans from the notes G4 to A5.

== Critical reception ==
"Ghosts" was met with generally positive reviews. The song was compared to Queen's "Bohemian Rhapsody". Luke O'Neil of MTV stated, "'Ghosts' is a pogo-worthy sprint for the bulk of its near 5 minutes, with call and response and gang vocals giving the track its charge of shout-along spirit." O'Neil complimented the groups work for their "next level of musical maturity."

== Music video ==
The music video for "Ghosts" was announced on November 10, 2013, where it was scheduled to premiere via Entertainment Tonight on November 15. It was directed by Brant Kantor. The video showcases the band performing in and exploring a haunted hotel. Yahoo! Movies described the video as a "pop-punk video with great production value and innovative concepts." The video is filled with elements of horror, fantasy and melodrama.

== Credits and personnel ==
Credits for "Ghosts" adapted from the album's liner notes.

Mayday Parade

- Derek Sanders – lead vocals, keyboards
- Jeremy Lenzo – bass guitar
- Alex Garcia – lead guitar
- Brooks Betts – rhythm guitar
- Jake Bundrick – drums, backing vocals

Production

- Zack Odom – producer
- Kenneth Mount – producer

== Charts ==
Chart performance for "Ghosts"
Chart (2013)	Peak position
UK Rock & Metal (Official Charts)	35
US Hot Rock & Alternative Songs (Billboard)	46

== Release history ==
Release history for "Ghosts"
Region	Date	Format	Label	Ref.
Various	August 27, 2013	Digital download	Fearless	
