= Stay (Mayday Parade song) =

Song by Mayday Parade

from the album Mayday Parade
- Released: 2011
- Genre: Emo
- Length: 3:34
- Label: ILG; Fearless; MDP
- Songwriters: Derek Sanders; Jeremy Lenzo; Alex Garcia; Jake Bundrick; Brooks Betts
- Producers: Zack Odom; Kenneth Mount

Music video
- "Stay" on YouTube

"Stay" is a song by American rock band Mayday Parade from their third studio album, Mayday Parade (2011). A music video for the song premiered on April 4, 2012. In the US, the song peaked on the Billboard Alternative Digital Song Sales and Rock Digital Song Sales charts at number 17 and number 26, respectively.

== Background and composition ==
"Stay" was written by Derek Sanders, Jeremy Lenzo, Alex Garcia, Jake Bundrick and Brooks Betts, while production was handled by Zack Odom and Kenneth Mount. The song is about going "through the pain and fear of losing a loved one." The song has been described as a ballad track. The song is in the key of C-sharp major, though when the band performs the track live, they perform it a half-step down from the original, as Sanders found playing it that way a lot easier. Lead guitarist Brooks Betts also said the rhythm part is played a half-step down on the official recording. According to the sheet music published at Musicnotes.com, by Alfred Music Publishing, the track runs at 112 BPM. Sander's range in the song spans from the notes D♭4 – A♭5.

== Critical reception ==
"Stay" was met with positive reviews from music critics. David Greenwald of MTV described the track as a "girlfriend-apology-anthem" and added, "some heart-touching string arrangements gives the track that 'I Don't Want to Miss a Thing' blockbuster quality." Drew Beringer of AbsolutePunk.net stated that Sander's showcased his "best vocal performance" and called it the "emotional highpoint of the album."

== Music video ==
The music video for "Stay" was shot in January 2012. The group filmed the music video in Ohio. It was officially released on April 4, 2012 and was directed by Thunder Down Country. It is a live-action continuation of the animated video for the band's previous single, "Oh Well, Oh Well".

== Credits and personnel ==
Credits for "Stay" adapted from the album's liner notes.

Mayday Parade

- Derek Sanders – lead vocals, piano
- Jeremy Lenzo – bass guitar, backing vocals
- Alex Garcia – lead guitar
- Brooks Betts – rhythm guitar
- Jake Bundrick – drums, backing vocals

Production

- Zack Odom – producer
- Kenneth Mount – producer

== Charts ==
Chart performance for "Stay"
| Chart (2011) | Peak position |
|---|---|
| US Alternative Digital Song Sales (Billboard) | 17 |
| US Rock Digital Song Sales (Billboard) | 26 |
