= What It Means to Fall Apart =

Studio album by Mayday Parade
- Released: November 19, 2021
- Recorded: 2020
- Genres: Pop-punk; emo
- Length: 44:19
- Label: Rise
- Producers: Zack Odom; Kenneth Mount

Mayday Parade chronology
Out of Here (2020)	What It Means to Fall Apart (2021)	Sweet (2025)

Singles from What It Means to Fall Apart
- 1. "Kids of Summer" Released: June 22, 2021; 2. "Bad at Love" Released: August 17, 2021; 3. "One For The Rocks And One For The Scary" Released: September 24, 2021; 4. "Golden Days" Released: October 29, 2021; 5. "Think of You" Released: November 17, 2021

What It Means to Fall Apart is the seventh studio album by American rock band Mayday Parade. It was released on November 19, 2021, via Rise Records, and was their second and final album for the label. The group worked with Zack Odom and Kenneth Mount to produce the album.

== Background ==
On September 23, 2021, the group announced the release date and track list for What It Means to Fall Apart. The album had come together with the way the world had been for the last few years, according to lead vocalist Derek Sanders.

"There was a lot of frustration with the way the world has been the last few years, and I think that made its way into the songs for sure. I'd like to think that a lot of it is hopeful, looking towards the future with hope, and for better days ahead. I feel like it's a balance of those two things, dealing with the pain and the frustration of everything that’s been happening in the world but not dwelling on it too much."

The album chronicles the life and times of Mayday Parade for the past 15 years, while addressing the "varied waves of mental health, and an unending plague."

== Composition ==
What It Means to Fall Apart sees the group return to their "emo roots and traditional sound," working with producers Zack Odom and Kenneth Mount. During the summer of 2020, the band headed to Atlanta to work on the album. While working on the album, Sanders stated that the album originally started out remotely, with the band popping in and out of the studio to record batches of songs in three separate sessions. The second track, "Golden Days" was written as a result of pandemic fatigue. Sanders stated, "After a year of restrictions and negativity, I was hopeful that better days would soon be ahead." The third track, "Think of You" is a song centered around compassion. Drummer Jake Bundrick described the song's meaning; "'Think Of You' is about not wanting to miss a single moment with someone in your life and cherishing every moment you do have with that person, place or thing." Other tracks such as "If My Ghosts Don't Play, I Don't Play" and "You Not Me" were described as "fast-paced tracks" that features heavier sounds. The seventh track, "Bad at Love" is an emotional ballad about lost love. "I Can't Do This Anymore" has been described as a more "grimmer track" that explores the topic of uncertainty of the pandemic.

== Release ==
"Kids of Summer" was released on June 22, 2021 as the lead single from the album. A music video was also released in promotion for the song.

"Bad at Love" was released as the album's second single on August 17, 2021. The group premiered a music video for the track on August 16, 2021.

"One For The Rocks And One For The Scary" was released as the third single from the album on September 24, 2021. A music video for the song was released on September 23, 2023.

"Golden Days" was released on October 29, 2021 as the fourth single from the album with the music video premiering the same day.

"Think of You" was released from the album as the fifth and final single on November 17, 2021 along with its music video.

== Critical reception ==
Professional ratings
Review scores
Source	Rating
EUPHORIA	4/5 stars
Hysteria	7/10
Rock Sins	7/10
The Spill Magazine	4.5/5 stars
Upset	4/5 stars
Wall of Sound	6/10

What It Means to Fall Apart was met with positive reviews from music critics. Luke Wells of EUPHORIA gave the album a positive review praising tracks such "You Not Me" and "Golden Days" as "lyrical heavy hitters." He also described the track "Heaven" as the one with "experimental R&B vibes." He complimented the song, "If My Ghosts Don't Play, I Don't Play", that showcases the group's "versatility within the punk rock genre."

Chanel Issa of Hysteria also gave a positive review for the album remarking, "There's 'Think of Me', the album's acoustic ditty, reminiscent of summer days, especially with its little touches like whistling. Then, there's our standout track, 'If My Ghosts Don't Play, I Don't Play', which dips its toes into the alt-rock world." However, was critical on the track "Heaven" calling it the album's "lower points." Overall, Hysteria stated that, "What It Means to Fall Apart doesn't quite hold the same spark that made some of their past records such classics, but it is still pretty damn good."

Wall of Sound gave a mixed review of the album stating, "The first half of the record feels as though Mayday Parade have matured in their sound and they've done something outside of their realm which usually I love, but for some reason this time, I just feel like it almost needed just a little bit of a tweak before I would have said that this was absolute perfection as a full record itself."

== Track listing ==
All tracks are written by Mayday Parade.

No.	Title	Length
1.	"Kids of Summer"	3:39
2.	"Golden Days"	4:09
3.	"Think of You"	3:55
4.	"If My Ghosts Don't Play, I Don't Play"	4:07
5.	"Sideways"	4:04
6.	"One For The Rocks And One For The Scary"	4:03
7.	"Bad at Love"	3:22
8.	"Notice"	3:19
9.	"Heaven"	2:33
10.	"Angels Die Too"	3:53
11.	"You Not Me"	3:35
12.	"I Can't Do This Anymore"	3:40
Total length:		44:19

== Personnel ==
Credits for What It Means to Fall Apart adapted from AllMusic.

Mayday Parade

- Derek Sanders – lead vocals
- Jeremy Lenzo – bass guitar, backing vocals
- Alex Garcia – lead guitar
- Jake Bundrick – drums, backing vocals
- Brooks Betts – rhythm guitar

Production

- Anton Delost – engineering
- Brad Blackwood – engineering
- Kenneth Mount – engineering, producer
- Zack Odom – engineering, producer

== Charts ==
Chart performance for What It Means to Fall Apart
Chart (2022)	Peak position
UK Record Store Albums (OCC)	36

== Release history ==
Release dates and formats for What It Means to Fall Apart
Region	Date	Format	Label	Ref.
Various	November 19, 2021	Cassette; CD; digital download; LP; streaming	Rise	
