= Anywhere but Here (Mayday Parade album) =

Studio album by Mayday Parade
- Released: October 6, 2009
- Recorded: March 2009
- Studios: House of Loud, Elmwood Park, New Jersey
- Genres: Pop-punk; emo; pop rock
- Length: 38:37
- Labels: Fearless; Atlantic
- Producer: David Bendeth

Mayday Parade chronology
| A Lesson in Romantics (2007) | Anywhere but Here (2009) | Valdosta (2011) |

Singles from Anywhere but Here
- 1. "The Silence" Released: August 4, 2009; 2. "Kids in Love" Released: May 18, 2010; 3. "Anywhere but Here" Released: September 20, 2010

Anywhere but Here is the second studio album by American rock band Mayday Parade, released on October 6, 2009. The band started writing Anywhere but Here in January 2009, working with several co-writers. The band signed to Atlantic in March 2009. Later that month, the band started recording at House of Loud in Elmwood Park, New Jersey. The album's production was handled by producer David Bendeth. "The Silence" was released as a single in August and was followed by Anywhere but Here, released through Fearless Records, a couple of months later. "Kids in Love" was released as a single in May 2010. "Anywhere but Here" was released as a single in September.

== Background and recording ==
Vocalist/guitarist Jason Lancaster left Mayday Parade in March 2007, citing a lack of writing credit on the band's releases. (Note: Lancaster would later form Go Radio.) Bassist Jeremy Lenzo and drummer Jake Bundrick filled in for Lancaster's vocals, while guitarists Alex Garcia and Brooks Betts performed Lancaster's guitar parts. The band's debut album, A Lesson in Romantics, was released in July, through independent label Fearless Records. In early January 2009, the band began the writing process for a new album, which was expected to be released in the summer through Fearless Records. On March 31, it was announced the band had signed to major label Atlantic Records.

In late March, the band entered the studio with 50 songs. On March 30, the band started recording. They had two months to record the album. The group picked the 11 best songs, plus a couple that were later released on the deluxe edition. (Note: The deluxe edition tracks were "So Far Away" and "The Memory".) The album was recorded and mixed at House of Loud in Elmwood Park, New Jersey, with producer David Bendeth. The band were initially in talks with two other producers but chose Bendeth, according to Sanders, as "it just really made sense. [...] He brought a lot to the songs and we even did a little bit of writing with him." Sanders also mentioned that Bendeth "had a lot more to do with everything and had a heavier hand in everything". Bundrick said Bendeth put him through "drummer boot camp" and revealed that Bendeth is "not afraid to tell you how he feels about your playing or how much you may suck in a certain area." The group let Bendeth have his way as they "didn't really want to make Atlantic mad."

== Composition ==
Bundrick claimed the band didn't want to make this new album "too different", compared to A Lesson in Romantics. The band focused on "making the heavy parts heavier and the sad parts more sad." Sanders later recalled that "there was a lot of outside influence" from Atlantic Records that resulted in "a lot of co-writes". The label expected the band to release a pop album. While the band attempted to follow this direction, they were weighed down by "so much overbearing pressure", according to Betts.

"Kids in Love" was written by the band and Gregg Wattenberg. "Anywhere But Here" was written by the band and David Hodges. "The Silence", "If You Can't Live Without Me, Why Aren't You Dead Yet?", "Save Your Heart", and "Get Up" were written by the band and Bobby Huff. "Still Breathing" was written by the band and Dave Bassett. "Bruised and Scarred" was written by the band, Huff, and David Bendeth. "Center of Attention" was written by the band, Sam Hollander, and Dave Katz. "I Swear This Time I Mean It" and "The End" were written by the band. Bundrick said "Still Breathing" is one of his favorite songs from the album, explaining, "it's something everyone can relate to in a sense that it talks about being a man and doing everything you can to be your own person and be strong. The second verse of the song was written with this scenario in the back of our mind. You’re an American soldier in Iraq and you don't want to be there. Is it justified?."

== Release ==
In mid-June 2009, Sanders performed an untitled new song during a show in New Jersey. On June 24, the band's next album was announced for release in October. In July and August, the band went on a tour of the US with Metro Station. On July 28, the album's title was revealed: Anywhere but Here. The title-track was made available for streaming via Myspace the following day. "The Silence" was released as a single on August 4. On August 20, the album's track listing was revealed. On September 1, the album's art work was revealed. The art work was done by John Ryan Solis, while Kristie Borgmann was the art manager and Alex Kirzhner helped with the design. On September 15, a music video was released for "Anywhere by Here" via Myspace. Between September 24 and November 14, the band went on the AP Fall Ball Tour, alongside The Academy Is..., Set Your Goals, The Secret Handshake and You Me at Six.

On September 29, 2009, a music video was released for "The Silence" via mtvU. The video was directed by RAGE. It shows a woman who is close to having a nervous breakdown, with scenes of the band performing in an abandoned trailer park. That same day, "Get Up" was made available for streaming. Anywhere but Here was released on October 6, through Atlantic. On the same day, "The Silence" was released to radio, and again on November 3. In November and December, the band toured with The Dangerous Summer. Between January and March 2010, the band went on the 2010 edition of the Take Action Tour, supporting We the Kings. In February, it was announced that a music video was being filmed for "Kids in Love". The band supported Madina Lake on their tour of Europe between late March and mid April.

A music video for "Kids in Love" was released on April 1, 2010, but was shortly removed. The video was directed by Josh Mond. The video features a graphic depiction of a group of people on a road trip, taking drugs engaging in various sexual acts and streaking through a desert. Sanders explained that the band wanted to do something different from their previous music videos. Upon seeing the plot for the "Kids in Love" video the group thought it was "really cool and really interesting. It would get people talking". However, after seeing the final version, Sanders was "pretty shocked" and found it more explicit than intended. The band's fans were upset with the video. Eventually, the band released a "clean" version of the video. "Kids in Love" was released to mainstream radio on April 6, and released as a single on May 18.

In May 2010, the band supported Sing It Loud. The band went on the 2010 edition of Warped Tour. On September 20, "Anywhere but Here" was released as a single. In September and October, the band went on a UK tour with The Maine. The band headlined the Fearless Friends Tour, with support from Breathe Carolina, Every Avenue, Artist vs. Poet, and Go Radio, in October and November. This became the band's first ever headlining tour. A music video for "Get Up" was released on January 31, 2011. The band would later record "Kids in Love" and "Bruised and Scarred" acoustically for the Valdosta (2011) EP.

== Reception ==
Professional ratings
Review scores
| Source | Rating |
|---|---|
| AbsolutePunk | 77% |
| AllMusic | 2.5/5 stars |
| Alter the Press! | 2/5 |
| Melodic | 3/5 stars |
| The Music | 3.5/5 stars |
| Rock Sound | 7/10 |
| Sputnikmusic | 3/5 |
| The Gazette (Cedar Rapids) | Favorable |

The album generally received mixed to positive reviews from critics. In his review for AllMusic, Andrew Leahey commented that the album was "entirely risk-free" but that the band does "an adequate job". Jeremy Aaron of AbsolutePunk wrote, "in the aftermath of a major lineup change, have given themselves something of a new identity, and for the most part, they wear it well. Anywhere but Here isn't anything groundbreaking, but it's mostly enjoyable and definitely has its bright spots that, with the right promotion, could launch them into the limelight."

Pär Winberg of Melodic praised the writing and production on the album, stating, "it is perfectly done [...] it's a nice production and package, delivered by a major record company. And then you know what you'll get some radio ballads and some nice radio-tracks done with co-writers."

Anywhere but Here debuted at number 31 on the Billboard 200. In retrospect, Sanders said the band simply recorded songs that they "didn't care about as much or love as much". Brooks pointed out that it wasn't "the best representation [of the band]." Sanders later said of the album in 2020, that "doing the recent 10-year-anniversary shows has given me a renewed appreciation of that album and helped me get past some of the negative feelings I had toward it."

== Track listing ==
All tracks are written by Mayday Parade, alongside additional writers as noted.

Standard edition
| No. | Title | Writer(s) | Length |
|---|---|---|---|
| 1. | "Kids in Love" | Gregg Wattenberg | 3:15 |
| 2. | "Anywhere But Here" | David Hodges | 3:09 |
| 3. | "The Silence" | Bobby Huff | 3:35 |
| 4. | "Still Breathing" | Dave Bassett | 3:52 |
| 5. | "Bruised and Scarred" | David Bendeth | 3:23 |
| 6. | "If You Can't Live Without Me, Why Aren't You Dead Yet?" | Huff | 3:38 |
| 7. | "Save Your Heart" | Huff | 3:42 |
| 8. | "Get Up" | Huff | 3:03 |
| 9. | "Center of Attention" | Sam Hollander; Dave Katz | 3:01 |
| 10. | "I Swear This Time I Mean It" | | 4:01 |
| 11. | "The End" | | 3:37 |
| Total length: | | | 38:37 |

iTunes deluxe edition bonus tracks
| No. | Title | Length |
|---|---|---|
| 12. | "So Far Away" | 4:38 |
| 13. | "The Memory" | 4:10 |
| 14. | "The Silence" (music video) | 3:34 |
| 15. | "Anywhere But Here" (music video) | 3:13 |

== Personnel ==
Personnel per digital booklet.

Mayday Parade

- Derek Sanders – lead vocals, keyboards, acoustic guitar
- Alex Garcia – lead guitar
- Brooks Betts – rhythm guitar
- Jeremy Lenzo – bass guitar, backing vocals
- Jake Bundrick – drums, backing vocals

Production

- David Bendeth – producer, mixing
- Dan Korneff – digital editing, engineer, mixing engineer
- John Bender – digital editing, engineer
- Kato Khandwala – digital editing, engineer
- Mitch Milan – assistant engineer
- Alex Kirzhner – art direction, design
- John Ryan Solis – cover illustration
- Connie Makita – secret art friend
- Andrew Zaeh – photography
- Kristie Borgmann – art manager
- Michelle Piza – packaging manager

== Charts ==
Chart performance for Anywhere but Here
| Chart (2009) | Peak position |
|---|---|
| US Billboard 200 | 31 |
| US Top Alternative Albums (Billboard) | 8 |
| US Top Rock Albums (Billboard) | 12 |
