= Jamie All Over =

Single by Mayday Parade

from the album A Lesson in Romantics
- B-side: "Miserable at Best"
- Released: May 20, 2008
- Studio: Tree Sound Studios (Atlanta, Georgia)
- Genre: Pop-punk; emo
- Length: 3:36
- Label: Fearless
- Songwriters: Jason Lancaster; Derek Sanders; Jeremy Lenzo; Alex Garcia; Jake Bundrick; Brooks Betts
- Producers: Zack Odom; Kenneth Mount

Mayday Parade singles chronology
| "When I Get Home, You're So Dead" (2008) | "Jamie All Over" (2008) | "The Silence" (2009) |

Music video
- "Jamie All Over" on YouTube

"Jamie All Over" is a song by American rock band Mayday Parade. It was released on May 20, 2008, as the second single from their debut studio album, A Lesson in Romantics. It is the band's biggest commercial success, having been certified platinum in the United States by the RIAA; it is their first and only single to receive a certification award.

== Background and release ==
"Jamie All Over" was originally written and released by Kid Named Chicago, before they merged with Defining Moment to form Mayday Parade. The track was written by Jason Lancaster, Derek Sanders, Jeremy Lenzo, Alex Garcia, Jake Bundrick and Brooks Betts, while production was handled by Zack Odom and Kenneth Mount.

In an interview with AbsolutePunk, the band spoke about why they chose to re-record the song stating, "'Jamie All Over' was never on a CD, and we wanted people to hear it [...] 'Jamie All Over' was kind of a tough one to choose because we had so many new songs, so going back and doing an old one seemed kind of inappropriate at first, but in the end I feel pretty happy with the decision."

"Jamie All Over" was made available for streaming on June 19, 2007, via AbsolutePunk. The song was later released as the second single from their debut studio album on May 20, 2008. The song was serviced to alternative radio on September 2. In March 2019, a vinyl edition of "Jamie All Over" was released, with "Miserable at Best" serving as the B-side.

== Critical reception ==
Music critics widely described "Jamie All Over" as a great opening track of A Lesson in Romantics. Writing for AbsolutePunk, Joe DeAndrea described the track as "a song that'll instantly get stuck in your head." Daniel Thompson of Music Emissions stated, "It will immediately pull the listener into the music and pay close attention [...] The chorus is very catchy, which reminds me of a Jack's Mannequin style of writing." Sputnikmusic remarked, "'Jamie All Over''s passionate cries merge so well with the broken guitar riffs and energetic drumming you've heard a million times before, but it's just better."

== Music video ==
The music video for "Jamie All Over" premiered on July 28, 2008, via MTV. The video was shot in New York City, May 6, 2008, and was directed by Travis Kopach. The video showcases the group "stack their chips high in the great tradition of glossy Vegas," in a "James Bond Style Casino."

== Accolades ==
Accolades for "Jamie All Over"
| Publication | Country | Accolade | Year | Rank | Ref. |
|---|---|---|---|---|---|
| Cleveland.com | United States | "Top 100 Pop-punk Songs" | 2022 | 66 | |

== Track listing ==
CD single
| No. | Title | Length |
|---|---|---|
| 1. | "Jamie All Over" | 3:36 |

7" vinyl
| No. | Title | Length |
|---|---|---|
| 1. | "Jamie All Over" | 3:36 |
| 2. | "Miserable at Best" | 5:16 |

== Credits and personnel ==
Credits for "Jamie All Over" adapted from the album's liner notes.

Mayday Parade

- Derek Sanders – lead vocals
- Jeremy Lenzo – bass guitar, backing vocals
- Alex Garcia – lead guitar
- Brooks Betts – rhythm guitar
- Jake Bundrick – drums, backing vocals

Additional musicians

- Jason Lancaster – co-lead vocals and guitar

Production

- Zack Odom – producer
- Kenneth Mount – producer
- Mark Needham – mixing
- Steve Hall – mastering

== Certifications ==
Certifications and sales for "Jamie All Over"
| Region | Certification | Certified units/sales |
|---|---|---|
| United States (RIAA) | Platinum | 1,000,000^{‡} |
^{‡} Sales+streaming figures based on certification alone.

== Release history ==
Release history for "Jamie All Over"
| Region | Date | Format | Label | Ref. |
|---|---|---|---|---|
| Various | May 20, 2008 | Digital download | Fearless | |
| United States | September 2, 2008 | Alternative radio | Fearless | |
| United States | March 25, 2019 | Vinyl | Fearless | |
