= Monsters in the Closet (Mayday Parade album) =

Studio album by Mayday Parade
- Released: October 8, 2013
- Recorded: January–April, May–June 2013
- Genres: Pop-punk; pop rock; emo
- Length: 45:38
- Label: Fearless
- Producers: Zack Odom; Kenneth Mount

Mayday Parade chronology
Mayday Parade (2011)	Monsters in the Closet (2013)	Black Lines (2015)

Singles from Monsters in the Closet
- 1. "Ghosts" Released: August 27, 2013; 2. "Girls" Released: September 17, 2013

Monsters in the Closet is the fourth studio album by American rock band Mayday Parade. Recorded between January and June 2013, the album was produced by Zack Odom and Kenneth Mount. It was released on October 8, 2013, by Fearless and sold 30,000 copies in its first week. The album debuted at number 10 on the Billboard 200, their highest charting album to date.

== Background and production ==
In July 2012, lead guitarist Alex Garcia confirmed that the band was writing material for the next album, with each member writing individually. After releasing their third album, Mayday Parade (2011), through major label ILG, Mayday Parade would re-sign with independent label Fearless in January 2013. Drummer Jake Bundrick explained that the label "has always been family to us and we're really happy to have that again. Exciting times!."

Discussing new material, bassist Jeremy Lenzo described the songs as "ha[ving] a little bit of everything". "Ghosts", according to Lenzo, deals with "your inner demons, and it portrays that in a literal sense by referring to them as ghosts and how they are always with you." Singer Derek Sanders stated the song "Last Night for a Table of Two" was an idea he thought of a while back and is about a "rough night" he had on New Year's Eve. The song "The Torment of Existence Weighed Against the Horror of Nonbeing" is about the ups and downs of the band being on the road. In an interview with Billboard, he also felt that the band "really stepped up" when it came to the instrumentation. The album also sees more writing contribution from other members. Sanders stated that with the first three albums, it was him and Bundrick coming up with most of the ideas, however, with Lenzo and rhythm guitarist Brooks Betts getting involved with the writing process, "it made the record mean a lot more to everyone." Speaking about the album in retrospect, Sanders believed they "didn't quite hit the mark with that one [...] We loved the process of making it, but with the benefit of hindsight, it does fall a bit flat for me."

Also in January, the band started recording. On March 23, the band posted a studio update. On April 4, the band posted another studio video, this time with Lenzo discussing his bass parts. Between April 11 and May 12, the band went on the Spring Fever Tour supporting All Time Low and Pierce the Veil. The writing process for the album continued in May. On June 27, it was announced that recording had finished. On July 11, the band released a third studio update. A week later, the band posted a fourth studio update video.

== Release ==
Monsters in the Closet was announced on July 29, 2013, for release, and the cover art was revealed. On August 23, the track listing was revealed. "Ghosts" was released as a single on August 27. "Girls" was released as a single on September 17. On September 18, a lyric video was released for "Girls". An album preview was posted via Buzznet on October 1. On October 7, Monsters in the Closet was made available for streaming via Billboard, and was released through Fearless, a day later. (Note: U.S. Fearless FRL 30180-2) The album was released on vinyl the same day. On October 14, a music video also made into lyric video format was released for "12 Through 15", produced and directed by Bobby Czzowitz. On October 16, the album was released in Japan, which features a demo version of "Ghosts". In October and November, the band headlined the Glamour Kills tour with support from Man Overboard, Cartel, and Stages & Stereos.

On November 14, a music video was released for "Ghosts" via Entertainment Tonight. The video was directed by Brant Kantor. The video takes place in a haunted bed and breakfast. Zach Seemayer of Entertainment Tonight noted that the video includes "elements of horror, fantasy and melodrama, and turning them on their head in a funny, rollicking pop-punk video". He also mentioned that the video had "great production value and innovative concepts." In January and February, the band went on a tour of the UK and Europe, titled Monsters Overseas. They were supported by Man Overboard, Divided by Friday and Decade. This was followed by a tour of South Asia in March. On April 28, a music video was released for "Hold Onto Me". The video was directed by Dan Centrone.

In late April and May, the band went on the So Devastating, It's Unnatural tour with support from We Are the in Crowd, Transit and Divided by Friday. On May 26, "Worth a Thousand Words" was made available for streaming through PureVolume, "Stuck in Remission" was made available for streaming through PropertyofZack, and "Hear the Sound" was made available for streaming through AbsolutePunk. A deluxe edition of the album was released on May 27 featuring the aforementioned three tracks. Lenzo explained that since the group were "so happy" with the reception for the album, they "decided to [...] [include] a few songs that didn't make it on the [original] release so that you could hear everything we were working on, and see other directions the album could have gone." The band went on the 2014 edition of Warped Tour. In October and November, the band went on the Honeymoon Tour with support from Tonight Alive, Major League and PVRIS.

On December 1, 2023, the album was re-issued on its 10 year anniversary, featuring six previously unreleased demos, via Fearless Records and Craft Recordings. It was released as a 2-LP vinyl.

== Reception ==
Professional ratings
Review scores
Source	Rating
AbsolutePunk	75%
Alter the Press!	3/5 stars
Daily Dischord	7/10 stars
Iowa State Daily	4/5
Kerrang!	4/5 stars
Renowned for Sound	4/5 stars
Ultimate Guitar Archive	6.3/10

Monsters in the Closet was met with positive reviews from music critics. Drew Beringer of AbsolutePunk praised the band's songwriting, stating it "has never sounded this crisp and energetic." He also complimented singer Derek Sanders' vocal performance on the record, calling it his "most passionate yet." AllMusic writer James Christopher Monger said the album "stays true to the band's penchant for crafting fiery four-minute pop-punk gems that rely on huge backbeats, catchy riffs, and fist-pumping gang vocals." A mixed review was written by Daniel Cribb of The Music, who praised the opening track "Ghosts", describing the song as a blend between Fun and Queen. However, he felt that the rest of the album sounded "too similar to 2011's self-titled record" and criticized the lack of any new innovation for the record. Janelle Tucknott of Renowned for Sound stated the album "is nothing that we haven't already heard from Mayday Parade, but that doesn't mean it isn't impressive [...] the album is a beautiful and moving collection of songs and another hit for the Tallahassee boys." A staff writer from Ultimate Guitar said, "Mayday Parade do not try and be revolutionary, groundbreaking, or unique: even when compared to their earlier efforts. They instead provide a familiar-sounding musical experience, that should easily appeal to any established Mayday Parade or mainstream radio listener."

== Commercial performance ==
Monsters in the Closet debuted at number 10 on the Billboard 200 chart, selling 30,000 copies and becoming the band's best debut week. The album also charted at number 4 on Alternative Albums, number 10 on Digital Albums, number 2 on Independent Albums, and number 4 on the Rock Albums charts in the U.S. The album reached number 52 on the Australian Albums Chart and number one on the Australian Hitseekers Albums Chart. In the UK, the album peaked at number 103 on the UK Albums Chart and number eight on the UK Rock & Metal Albums Chart. "Ghosts" charted at number 16 on the UK Independent Singles Breakers Chart, number 35 on the UK Rock & Metal Singles Chart, and number 46 on the Rock Songs chart in the U.S.

== Track listing ==
All tracks are written by Mayday Parade

No.	Title	Length
1.	"Ghosts"	4:42
2.	"Girls"	3:22
3.	"Last Night for a Table of Two"	3:39
4.	"12 Through 15"	4:58
5.	"The Torment of Existence Weighed Against the Horror of Nonbeing"	4:04
6.	"Even Robots Need Blankets"	3:24
7.	"Repent and Repeat"	2:54
8.	"Demons"	3:31
9.	"Sorry, Not Sorry"	3:25
10.	"Nothing You Can Live Without, Nothing You Can Do About"	3:55
11.	"Hold Onto Me"	3:15
12.	"Angels"	4:14
Total length:		45:38

Deluxe edition bonus tracks
No.	Title	Length
13.	"Hear the Sound"	4:05
14.	"Stuck in Remission"	3:26
15.	"Worth a Thousand Words"	3:42
Total length:		55:51

Japan bonus track
No.	Title	Length
13.	"Ghosts" (demo)

10th anniversary edition
No.	Title	Length
13.	"Ghosts" (demo)
14.	"Girls" (demo)
15.	"Promise" (demo)
16.	"Circus" (demo)
17.	"Forget" (demo)
18.	"Breathe" (demo)

== Personnel ==
Personnel per digital booklet.

Mayday Parade

- Derek Sanders – lead vocals, keyboards
- Alex Garcia – lead guitar
- Brooks Betts – rhythm guitar
- Jeremy Lenzo – bass guitar, vocals
- Jake Bundrick – drums, vocals

Additional musicians

- Tiffany Houghton – additional vocals
- Zack Odom – string arrangement, viola
- Rami Jaffee – Hammond B3 organ
- Seth Mann – violin
- Mary Beth Bryant – cello
- Mike Fogleman – professional gang vocals

Production

- Zack Odom, Kenneth Mount – producers, recording
- Darrick Atwater – assistant for drum tracking
- Daniel Korneff – mixing
- Brad Blackwood – mastering

== Charts ==
Chart performance for Monsters in the Closet
Chart (2013)	Peak position
Australian Albums (ARIA)	52
UK Albums (OCC)	103
UK Independent Albums (OCC)	22
UK Independent Album Breakers (OCC)	4
UK Rock & Metal Albums (Official Charts)	8
US Billboard 200	10
US Top Alternative Albums (Billboard)	4
US Independent Albums (Billboard)	2
US Top Rock Albums (Billboard)	4

== Release history ==
Release dates and formats for Monsters in the Closet
Region	Date	Format(s)	Edition	Label	Ref.
United States	October 8, 2013	CD; digital download; LP; vinyl	Standard	Fearless	
Europe	October 8, 2013	CD; digital download	Standard	Fearless	
Japan	October 16, 2013	CD	Japan bonus track	Kick Rock Invasion	
Various	May 27, 2014	CD; digital download	Deluxe	Fearless	
United States	December 1, 2023	LP; vinyl	10th anniversary	Fearless; Craft Recordings	
