= Mayday Parade =

American rock band

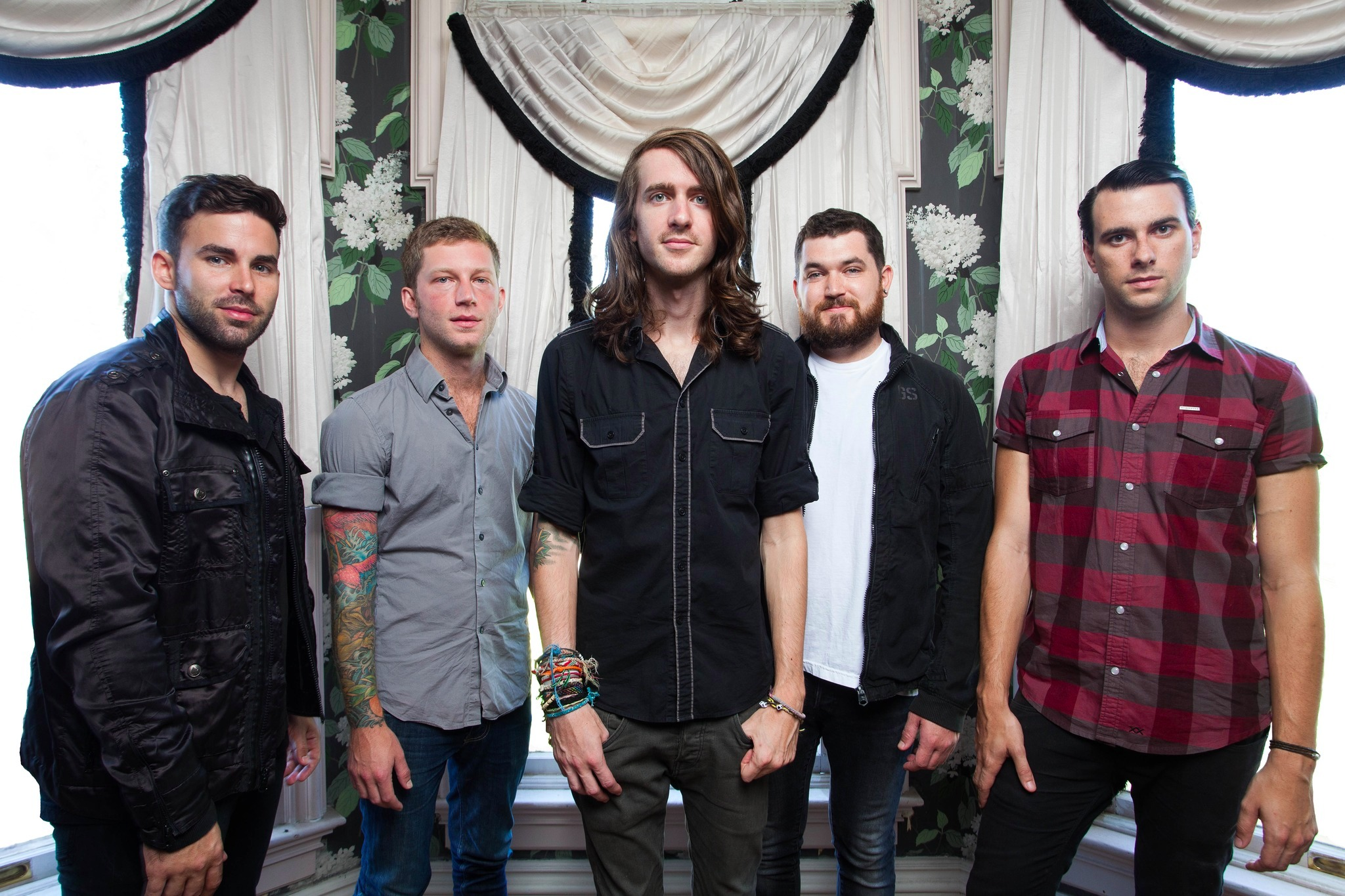
- Mayday Parade in 2014

Background information
- Origin: Tallahassee, Florida, U.S.
- Genres: Pop-punk; pop rock; alternative rock; emo
- Works: Mayday Parade discography
- Years active: 2005–present
- Labels: Fearless; Atlantic; ILG; MDP; Rise; Bangarang Music; Many Hats Distribution
- Spinoffs: Go Radio
- Spinoff of: Kid Named Chicago, Defining Moment
- Members: Derek Sanders; Alex Garcia; Brooks Betts; Jeremy Lenzo; Jake Bundrick
- Past members: Jason Lancaster
- Website: maydayparade.com

Mayday Parade is an American rock band formed in Tallahassee, Florida, in 2005, as the result of a merger between two local Tallahassee bands, Kid Named Chicago and Defining Moment. Their debut EP Tales Told by Dead Friends was released in 2006 and sold over 50,000 copies without any label support. In July 2007, Mayday Parade released their debut album A Lesson in Romantics. Having been signed to Fearless Records since 2006, the band also signed onto a major label with Atlantic Records in 2009. Their second studio album, Anywhere but Here was released in October 2009 and their third album, entitled Mayday Parade, was released in October 2011. Mayday Parade's fourth album, titled Monsters in the Closet, was released in October 2013. Their fifth album, titled Black Lines, was released October 2015. In April 2018, the band signed to Rise Records and released their sixth studio album Sunnyland on June 15, 2018. Their seventh studio album, What It Means to Fall Apart, was released on November 19, 2021. In 2025, the band planned to release a three-part album, with the first installment, Sweet, released on April 18, the second, Sad, released on October 3, and the final entry, Sugar, released on July 24, 2026.

== History ==
=== Early years and Tales Told by Dead Friends (2005–2006) ===
Mayday Parade was formed in the winter of 2005 following the merger of two local Tallahassee bands, Kid Named Chicago and Defining Moment. Kid Named Chicago featured vocalist/guitarist Jason Lancaster, guitarist Alex Garcia and drummer Jake Bundrick, while Defining Moment featured vocalist Derek Sanders, guitarist Brooks Betts, and bassist Jeremy Lenzo. Both bands previously practiced in the same building, before it occurred to Lenzo that it "made more sense if we put them together instead of playing separately."

Still without a name, the band went into the studio to record their first EP Tales Told by Dead Friends, with producer Lee Dyess. They decided on the band name Mayday Parade during the week they spent recording in the studio. According to the group, the name was thought of by Garcia who was a fan of the word Mayday and made the suggestion to remember their time watching the hometown parades together. "Three Cheers For Five Years" and "When I Get Home, You're So Dead" were the first songs the band wrote. The EP was released on June 13, 2006.

The group performed at the 2006 Vans Warped Tour in the summer. During the tour, they began selling physical copies of their EP, roaming around venue parking lots and approached concert-goers standing in line. By the end of summer, the EP sold more than 10,000 copies. These sales caught the attention of Fearless Records, which the band signed with the label on August 29. Following their appearance on Warped Tour, the group began writing songs for their debut studio album. The band went on their first U.S. tour with Brandtson and Mêlée, then on another tour with Plain White T's shortly after the release of the EP.

=== A Lesson in Romantics and Lancaster's departure (2007–2008) ===
Mayday Parade at the 2008 Buzz Bake Sale

In January 2007, the band started to record their debut studio album, A Lesson in Romantics, which was completed that same month. The album was recorded in Atlanta, Georgia, with production handled by Zack Odom and Kenneth Mount. "When I Get Home, You're So Dead" and "Jamie All Over" were both re-recorded for the album, with the first previously receiving a big response from fans and the latter, a song that the group liked and decided to use it. In March, shortly after the album was completed, lead singer Jason Lancaster left the band citing a lack of writing credit on the band's releases. Due to this change, the group found it hard working out who should sing Lancaster's parts. Eventually, Lenzo and Bundrick filled in for Lancaster's vocals, while Garcia and Betts performed Lancaster's guitar parts.

On April 4, 2007, "Black Cat" was made available for streaming via Hot Topic's MySpace profile. Between early May and late June, the band went on tour with support from Bedlight for Blue Eyes, Driver Side Impact, and Sick City. The album was released on July 10, 2007. The album peaked at number eight on the US Heatseekers Albums chart. Mayday Parade supported their album on the 2007 Vans Warped Tour. In late September 2007, the band supported Paramore in Japan and Australia. They co-headlined a tour with Madina Lake from October to November 2007. "When I Get Home, You're So Dead" was released as the first single from the album on December 3, 2007, via iTunes. The music video for the song was eligible for two MTV Video Music Awards for Best Rock Video and Video of the Year.

Mayday Parade went on the Manwhores and Open Sores Tour alongside All Time Low, Every Avenue, and Just Surrender in January 2008. The band made their first UK appearance in April 2008 performing at the Give it a Name festival in Sheffield and London. "Jamie All Over" was released on May 20, 2008, as the album's second single. The band performed at the 2008 Vans Warped Tour. The group joined All Time Low, The Maine, and Every Avenue in Fall 2008 on The Compromising of Integrity, Morality, and Principles in Exchange for Money Tour. A Lesson in Romantics sold 200,000 copies in the United States, becoming their biggest selling album and was certified gold by the Recording Industry Association of America. The song "Miserable at Best" was also certified gold by the RIAA. In 2009, the group was featured in Punk Goes Pop Volume Two, performing a cover of "When I Grow Up" by The Pussycat Dolls.

=== Anywhere but Here (2009–2010) ===
The band began writing their new record in December 2008, the first writing process as a band without lyricist Lancaster. They began recording the album in March 2009, with 50 songs in the process. That same month, the band signed onto a major label with Atlantic. The album was recorded and mixed at House of Loud in Elmwood Park, New Jersey by producer David Bendeth. The group, along with their producer, management and label, chose the best 11 tracks for the album. The band finished recording in June 2009 and announced that the album would be released on October 6. The band performed at the Slam Dunk Festival in the UK in May 2009. They also toured with A Rocket to the Moon and We Are the In Crowd in the UK that same month. The group joined Metro Station and Mitchel Musso on their summer tour in 2009.

The title track, "Anywhere But Here", was posted on their MySpace on July 28. On August 4, "The Silence" was released as the album's first single via iTunes. Their second studio album, Anywhere But Here, was officially released on October 6, 2009. The album peaked at number 31 on the US Billboard 200 and sold 17,780 copies in its first week. Mayday Parade co-headlined the 2009 Fall Ball tour with The Academy Is..., with supporting acts such as You Me at Six, The Secret Handshake, and Set Your Goals.

They co-headlined the 2010 Take Action Tour along with We the Kings, A Rocket to the Moon, There for Tomorrow and Stereo Skyline. They also joined Madina Lake on their UK tour alongside We Are the Ocean in March and April 2010. The band supported Sing it Loud on their spring tour along with Motion City Soundtrack. "Kids in Love" was released to mainstream radio on April 6, 2010, as the album's second single. The group covered the song "We Are the Champions" by Queen for the compilation album Punk Goes Classic Rock, released on April 27, 2010. The band was also featured on the 2010 Vans Warped Tour. On September 20, "Anywhere but Here" was released as the third single from the album.

Mayday Parade co-headlined a UK tour in the fall of 2010 with The Maine. The band headlined the Fearless Friends tour from October to November 2010, with support from Breathe Carolina, Go Radio, Artist vs. Poet and Every Avenue. On October 14, 2010, the group released a cover of "In My Head" by Jason Derulo as a single from Punk Goes Pop Volume 03.. The band a cameo appearance on the 2010 comedy film, How to Make Love to a Woman.

=== Valdosta EP and Mayday Parade (2011–2012) ===
On March 8, 2011, the group released an EP titled Valdosta through Atlantic and Fearless Records. The EP was named after Valdosta, Georgia, where the band used to record their early material. It contained six tracks, including two brand new tracks titled "Amber Lynn" and "Terrible Things" as well as acoustic versions of "Kids in Love" and "Bruised and Scarred" from their second full-length studio album Anywhere but Here, "Your Song" from their Tales Told by Dead Friends and "Jamie All Over" from A Lesson in Romantics. On March 10, Songkick recognized Mayday Parade as the hardest-working band of 2010, with 194 bookings and 74,000 miles logged in the entire year, with Willie Nelson and Lady Gaga ranking No. 7 and No. 8 in comparison. On September 9, 2026, "Terrible Things" has received RIAA gold certification.

On July 13, 2011, the band announced that they departed from Atlantic Records and that their third studio album would be released independently. Written by the band in a beach house in Panacea, Florida, the self-titled album was produced by Zack Odom and Kenneth Mount, who also produced A Lesson in Romantics. In April 2011, drummer Jake Bundrick confirmed that their third full-length album had been completed. On July 6, 2011, Mayday Parade announced that they would be releasing their new self-titled album on October 4, 2011. The group wrote the album entirely by themselves and according to the band, they recorded "our way and not someone else's way this time". They also unveiled the track listing, revealing that the album had 12 songs. On July 27, Mayday Parade premiered the track "Oh Well, Oh Well" via Alternative Press. The song was released as the lead single from the album on August 1. On September 8, "When You See My Friends" was made available for streaming via MTV, and was released as a single a day later.

On October 4, 2011, Mayday Parade released their self-titled album and the album debuted at number 12 on the Billboard 200, selling nearly 27,000 copies in its first week. On October 5, 2011, Mayday Parade released a music video for "Oh Well, Oh Well" directed by Thunder Down Country. The animated video won the IndieStar TV award for Best Music Video of 2011. In October and November, the band headlined The Noise Tour with support from We Are the in Crowd, There for Tomorrow, You Me at Six and The Make. They later supported You Me at Six on their UK tour in March and April 2012. On April 4, 2012, the band released the music video for "Stay". In 2012, their debut album A Lesson In Romantics was released on vinyl. The band performed at the 2012 Vans Warped Tour.

In September, the group performed at the Bazooka Rocks Festival in the Philippines. The band co-headlined a US tour with The Maine, with support from The Postelles, in October and November. On October 15, 2012, the band released a cover of Gotye's "Somebody That I Used to Know" as a single from Punk Goes Pop Volume 5. The song features Vic Fuentes of Pierce the Veil. The song peaked at number 18 on the US Hot Rock & Alternative Songs chart and number 32 on the UK Rock & Metal Singles Chart. In December, the band went on a short Australian tour with We Are the in Crowd and Heroes for Hire.

=== Monsters in the Closet (2013–2014) ===
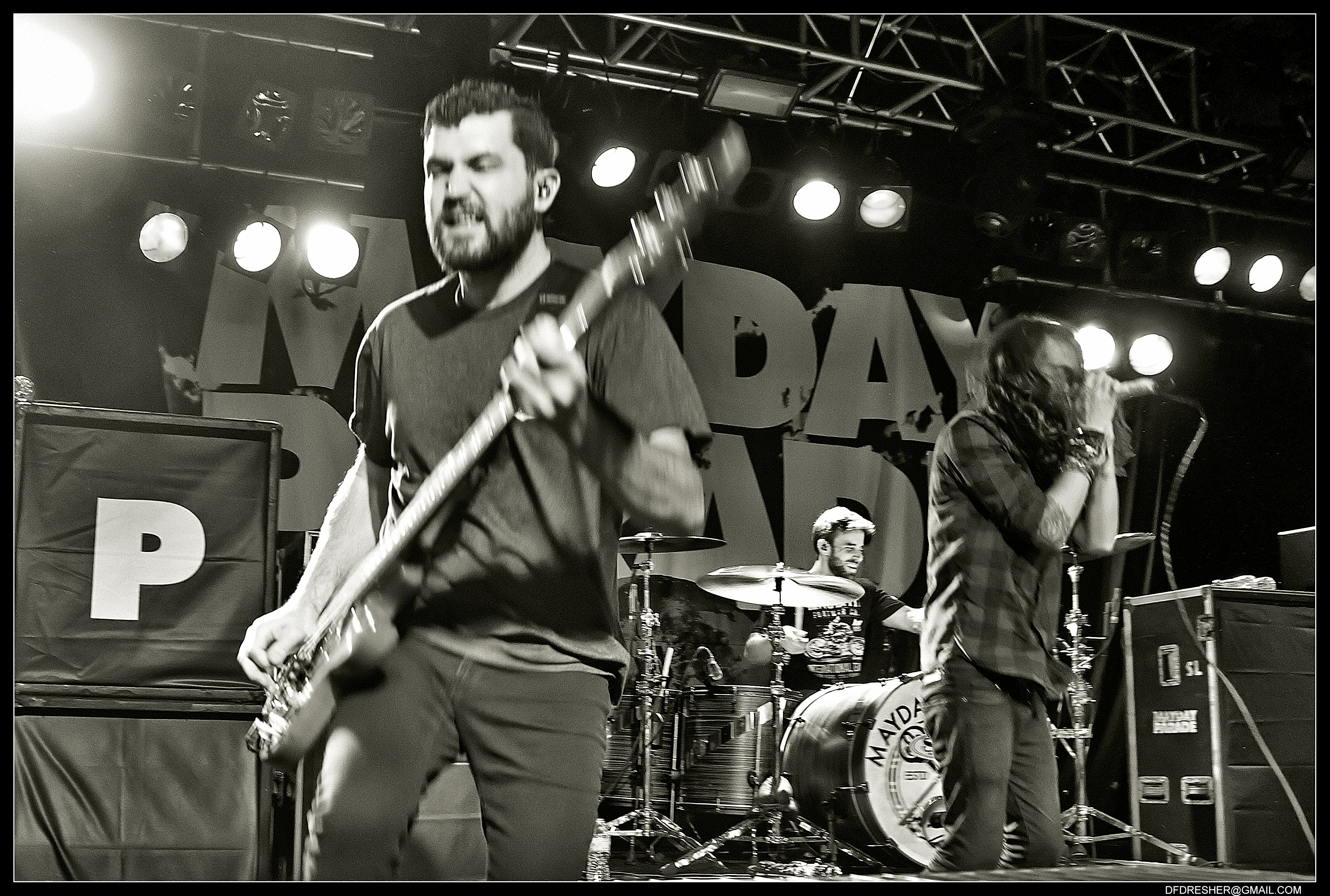
Mayday Parade live in 2014

On January 10, 2013, the band re-signed with Fearless Records and headed back into the studio to record their fourth studio album. The group supported All Time Low and Pierce the Veil on the Spring Fever Tour from April to May 2013. On June 26, Bundrick confirmed that the band had finished recording the album.

On August 27, the band released the first single "Ghosts" from their fourth studio album. The song peaked at number 46 on the US Hot Rock & Alternative Songs chart and number 35 on the UK Rock & Metal Singles Chart. On September 17, the band released the second single from the album, "Girls". On October 8, their fourth studio album, Monsters In The Closet, was officially released. The album debuted at number ten on the Billboard 200, selling 30,000 copies first week. The band headlined the Glamour Kills Tour in the fall of 2013. On November 15, the video for "Ghosts" was released. A music video produced and directed by Bobby Czzowitz, for the single “12 Through 15” was later released alongside a lyric video variant.

The group embarked on a European headlining tour called the Monsters Overseas Tour from January and February 2014, with support from Man Overboard, Divided by Friday, and Decade. In March 2014, the band covered "Comedown" by Bush, which was released as a single for the compilation album, Punk Goes 90s Vol. 2. In April 2014, the group headlined the So Devastating, It's Unnatural Tour with We Are the In Crowd, Transit and Divided By Friday joining as supporting acts. A deluxe version of Monsters in the Closet, with new songs included, was released on May 27, 2014. They performed at the 2014 Vans Warped Tour. In October and November, the band went on the Honeymoon Tour with support from Tonight Alive, Major League and PVRIS.

=== Black Lines (2015–2017) ===
In March 2015, the band began recording their fifth studio album with producer Mike Sapone. The group expressed how the previous two albums felt the same and how the songs were very similar in style, so they decided to work with a different producer in a new location and secluded themselves when writing and recording the album. According to Garcia, they wanted to "stretch past the creative limitations we could hear in the previous records." On May 21, Bundrick announced that the album was complete. On July 17, Mayday Parade announced that their new album Black Lines would be released on October 9 through Fearless. On July 31, the band released "Keep In Mind, Transmogrification Is A New Technology" as the album's first single. On October 2, "Letting Go" was released as the second single from the album. Black Lines debuted at number 21 on the Billboard 200, as well as topping the US Rock Albums chart and Alternative Albums chart with first week sales of 16,000 copies. Mayday Parade headlined the 2015 Alternative Press Tour with supporting acts from Real Friends, This Wild Life, and As It Is in October and November.

The group toured across the UK with support from The Maine, Have Mercy and Beautiful Bodies in January and February 2016. They co-headlined a tour with The Maine in March 2016, with support from Better Off. Mayday Parade performed at the Slam Dunk Festival in May 2016. The group performed at the 2016 Vans Warped Tour.

A 10th anniversary edition of Tales Told by Dead Friends, featuring new packaging and an additional track "The Problem with the Big Picture Is That It's Hard to See", was released in November 2016. The reissued edition peaked at number 12 on the US Vinyl Albums chart. Following this, a 10th anniversary edition of A Lesson in Romantics was released in March 2017, featuring demos. Producer Kenneth Mount criticized the band on Twitter for not giving Lancaster credit in commentary, "I'm slightly confused why mayday parades commentary for lesson in romantics never mentions Jason Lancaster at all, voice of 50% of the album...Jason also recorded all his vocals naked for a lesson in romantics, that should totally make the commentary. I've waited ten years for that".

=== Sunnyland (2018–2019) ===
In April 2018, the band announced that they signed with Rise Records and began teasing the release of their sixth studio album. In their announcement, the band said, "We appreciate the fact that they believe in our band still after all these years and we are so excited for everyone to hear what we've been working on." On May 3, the band released "Piece of Your Heart" as the lead single from their sixth studio album. The second single from the album, "Never Sure" was released on May 15. On May 31, "It's Hard to be Religious When Certain People Aren't Incinerated by Bolts of Lightning" was released as the album's third single. On June 5, the band released "Stay the Same" for streaming, before it was released as the fourth and final single from the album the following day. Sunnyland was officially released on June 15, 2018. The album peaked at number 104 on the Billboard 200.

Mayday Parade performed on the final cross-country Warped Tour in the summer of 2018. In January 2019, the band performed at 8123 Fest. In July and August, the band performed at the Sad Summer Fest. The band also co-headlined shows with State Champs, with support from Mom Jeans and Just Friends in the summer. Later in August, they appeared at the Reading and Leeds Festivals.

=== Out Of Here EP and What It Means To Fall Apart (2020–2022) ===
On March 5, 2020, the band released the track "It Is What It Is". On September 24, the band announced that they would be releasing their EP, Out of Here, on October 16. They also released "Lighten Up Kid" as the lead single from the EP on the same day. The band's drummer Jake Bundrick stated about the lead single: "'Lighten Up Kid' is about trying to find yourself and the strength to keep fighting for what you believe in. It's about being or feeling cut down and hung out to dry but standing up for yourself in the end." The EP Out Of Here was released on October 16, 2020, comprises three new tracks – "Lighten Up, Kid," "First Train" and "I Can Only Hope".

Recording for their seventh studio album began in the summer of 2020, where the group headed out to Atlanta, Georgia, to work with producers Zack Odom and Kenneth Mount. Initially, recording started out remotely, with the band popping in and out of the studio to record batches of songs in three separate sessions.

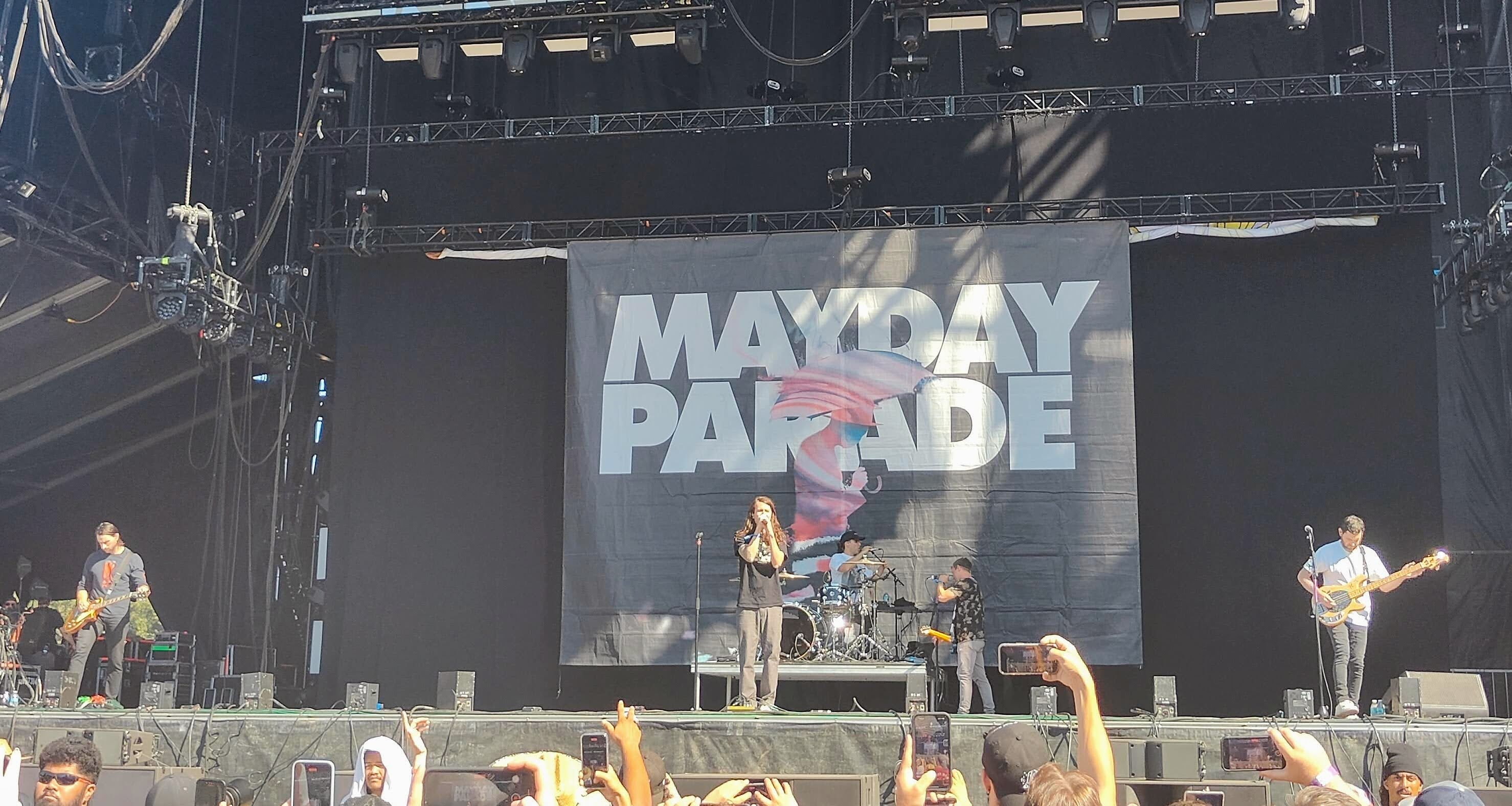
Mayday Parade at Aftershock 2023.

On June 22, 2021, the band released the first single "Kids Of Summer", from their upcoming seventh studio album. On August 17, they released the album's second single "Bad At Love". On September 23, they released a third single titled, "One For The Rocks And One For The Scary", while also announcing their seventh studio album, What It Means to Fall Apart, alongside the album tracklist. On October 29, they released the fourth single from the album, "Golden Days". On November 17, they released "Think Of You" as the fifth and final single from the album. The seventh studio album was released on November 19, 2021.

In early 2022, the group embarked on the 11th Anniversary Self-Titled Album Tour across North America, Australia and Europe, with support from Real Friends, As It Is and Those Who Dream. The band released a new track titled, "Losing My Mind" on May 20, 2022. The group performed at the 2022 Sad Summer Festival in July and August, as well as performing at the When We Were Young Festival in October.

=== Sweet, Sad, and Sugar (2023–present) ===
On May 5, 2023, the band released a new single titled "More Like a Crash". According to Sanders, once the group returns to the studio later in the year, they will continue focusing on releasing singles and "work on some of the songs that are different to what people might expect from Mayday Parade." He also added that the band will eventually record a full-length album. On June 30, the group released another single titled "Got Me All Wrong". In October 2023, the band announced that they would be joining Simple Plan on their UK tour in February 2024, as well as dropping a new single, "Miracle". In March 2024, the group released a self-titled lo-fi EP, working with producer Less Gravity. According to Bundrick, they "wanted to experiment" with the genre and re-worked some songs the band had previously released. On July 11, the group released a new single titled "Pretty Good to Feel Something", the lead single from the band's upcoming album.

In September 2024, the group covered Disney song Remember Me for A Whole New Sound, a compilation album featuring pop-punk covers of songs from classic Disney films.

In January 2025, the group announced a three-part album with the first installment, Sweet, released on April 18, 2025. On January 8, the group released the second single from the album "By the Way", which was followed by the announcement of a North American headlining tour Three Cheers for 20 Years on January 14. The tour began on April 22 and ran through June 6 with support from Microwave, Grayscale, and Like Roses. The following month, the band extended the Three Cheers tour to Australia, with dates announced for September 2025 with Jack's Mannequin and The Home Team. On August 13, Mayday Parade released "Under My Sweater" as the lead single to the second installment of a three-part album titled, Sad. On September 11, the band released "One Day at a Time" as the second single. Sad was released on October 3. The 3rd album titled Sugar was released on July 24, 2026.

The band was confirmed to be performing at the 2026 Sonic Temple music festival in Columbus, Ohio. The band are also confirmed to be appearing at Welcome to Rockville taking place in Daytona Beach, Florida in May 2026.

== Musical style ==
Mayday Parade's music makes strong use of melody. The band's early releases mainly contained elements of emo and punk rock, which drew comparisons to Yellowcard, Plain White T's, and All Time Low. The band's later releases employed a "harder rock edge" before they would eventually return to their original style on subsequent albums, according to AllMusic. Other publications have tagged the band's catalog as pop-punk, pop rock, alternative rock, emo pop, emo, and rock. A Lesson in Romantics has been described as pop-punk and emo. Anywhere but Here has been described as pop-punk and pop rock. Mayday Parade has been described as pop-punk and pop rock. Monsters in the Closet has been described as pop-punk, pop rock and rock. Black Lines has been described as emo, emo pop, pop-punk, and rock.

== Side projects ==
After Jason Lancaster parted ways, he formed a new band called Go Radio on which he released two EPs and two studio albums. The band broke up on October 7, 2013. A few months later, he announced that he would release solo music, having released a song on a Fearless Records compilation, and a solo album called As You Are released in June 2014.

In 2012, guitarist and bassist Brooks Betts and Jeremy Lenzo respectively announced their band Truth or Consequence. The band consists of Betts on vocals, guitar, drums, pedal steel and banjo, Lenzo on bass and vocals, and Alexandra Kees on violin and vocals; studio members include Lee Dyess on cello and Mayday Parade's lead singer Derek Sanders on piano. The band released their debut EP titled Second Fiddle on December 25, 2013.

== Band members ==
Current

- Derek Sanders – lead vocals, piano, additional guitar (2005–present)
- Alex Garcia – lead guitar (2005–present)
- Brooks Betts – rhythm guitar (2005–present), lead guitar (2005–2007), backing vocals (2007–present)
- Jeremy Lenzo – bass guitar, backing vocals (2005–present), co-lead vocals (2007–present)
- Jake Bundrick – drums, percussion (2005–present), backing vocals and co-lead vocals (2007–present)

Former

- Jason Lancaster – lead vocals, rhythm guitar (2005–2007)

== Discography ==
Studio albums

- A Lesson in Romantics (2007)
- Anywhere but Here (2009)
- Mayday Parade (2011)
- Monsters in the Closet (2013)
- Black Lines (2015)
- Sunnyland (2018)
- What It Means to Fall Apart (2021)

== Awards and nominations ==
=== Alternative Press Music Awards ===
Year	Nominated	Award	Result	Ref.
2014	Mayday Parade	Most Dedicated Fans	Nominated	
2016	Mayday Parade	Most Dedicated Fans	Nominated	

=== Indie Star TV Awards ===
Year	Nominated	Award	Result	Ref.
2011	"Oh Well, Oh Well"	Music Video of the Year	Won	
