= A Lesson in Romantics =

Studio album by Mayday Parade
- Released: July 10, 2007
- Recorded: January–February 2007
- Studios: Tree Sound, Atlanta, Georgia
- Genres: Pop-punk; emo; alternative rock
- Length: 46:42
- Label: Fearless
- Producers: Zack Odom; Kenneth Mount

Mayday Parade chronology
Tales Told by Dead Friends (2006)	A Lesson in Romantics (2007)	Anywhere but Here (2009)

Singles from A Lesson in Romantics
- 1. "When I Get Home, You're So Dead" Released: December 3, 2007; 2. "Jamie All Over" Released: May 20, 2008

A Lesson in Romantics is the debut studio album by American rock band Mayday Parade. The band resulted from a merger of two separate bands, Kid Named Chicago and Defining Moment. The band released an EP, Tales Told by Dead Friends, in June 2006, which they sold to people by following the 2006 edition of Warped Tour and offering copies; it eventually sold 10,000 copies. The band signed to Fearless Records in August. A Lesson in Romantics was recorded in early 2007, with producers Zack Odom and Kenneth Mount. Vocalist/guitarist Jason Lancaster left the band in March 2007, citing a lack of writing credit on the band's releases. Prior to the release of A Lesson in Romantics, "Black Cat", "When I Get Home, You're So Dead", and "Jamie All Over" were made available for streaming. After the album's release, the band participated in the 2007 edition of Warped Tour.

A Lesson in Romantics was released through Fearless on July 10. A music video for "When I Get Home, You're So Dead" was released in November, and the song was released as a single a month later. "Jamie All Over" was released as a single in May 2008 and a music video for the song was released two months later. The band then toured as part of the 2008 edition of Warped Tour. The music video for "When I Get Home, You're So Dead" earned two MTV Video Music Awards nominations in 2008. In January 2009, a music video was released for "Miserable at Best". A Lesson in Romantics is the band's most commercially successful release, eventually being certified gold by the Recording Industry Association of America. It was released on vinyl in November 2011. The album was featured on Rock Sound's 2014 list of the “51 Most Essential Pop Punk Albums of All Time”.

Mayday Parade would later go on to release the Anniversary version of the album called A Lesson in Romantics (Anniversary Edition), along with the commentary version, in 2017. The Anniversary edition of the album includes a previously unreleased song called "Coming Back With Winter", which includes the chorus from "Save Your Heart" (on Anywhere But Here).

== Background ==
Mayday Parade was formed in the winter of 2005 following the merger of two local Tallahassee bands, Kid Named Chicago and Defining Moment. Kid Named Chicago featured vocalist/guitarist Jason Lancaster, guitarist Alex Garcia and drummer Jake Bundrick, while Defining Moment featured vocalist Derek Sanders, guitarist Brooks Betts, and bassist Jeremy Lenzo. In June 2006, their EP Tales Told by Dead Friends was released. The band followed the 2006 edition of Warped Tour, selling copies of the EP to people in line. By the end of summer, the group had sold 10,000 copies of the EP. These sales caught the attention of Fearless Records, which signed Mayday Parade on August 29. Fearless label president Bob Becker said the group: "were really believable, they were obviously good musicians, and they were really tight sounding. And we already knew they were hard-working." Between late September and early November, the band went on the Text on the Dance Floor tour with Mêlée, Wheatus, Brandtson, Lakes, and Fall of Transition. Tales Told by Dead Friends was re-released through Fearless on November 7.

== Composition and recording ==
All of the songs on A Lesson in Romantics were written while touring after Warped Tour. The album was sonically described as pop-punk, emo, and alternative rock, while the album's lyrics explore themes such as heartbreak and romantic love. The songs are about: "being in a relationship while you're on the road, and the different hardships that come with that." Unlike the band's EP, the album was "more put together" and "more organized", according to Garcia. Sanders thought it stood up "pretty well" to the EP, noting that it was "just as catchy ", but "more powerful." "Jamie All Over" was originally recorded by Kid Named Chicago, Lancaster's previous band. Sanders claimed the song was "kind of a tough one to choose" because the band had a lot of new material to choose from, but felt "pretty happy" with its inclusion. "When I Get Home, You're So Dead" was one of the first songs the band wrote. The band originally did not want the song to be on the album, but was encouraged by the label to have it on the record. According to Garcia, the final track was called "You Be the Anchor That Keeps My Feet on the Ground, I'll Be the Wings That Keep Your Heart in the Clouds" because the band was "trying to be poetic". Explaining the meaning behind "I'd Hate to Be You When People Find Out What This Song Is About", Sanders said was about "an old friend that kind of screwed us over."

Mayday Parade went into the studio in January 2007. Recording took place at Tree Sound, located in Atlanta, Georgia until February 2007. The band worked with producers Zack Odom and Kenneth Mount, who also engineered the sessions. Sanders recalled recording a full-length album for the first time a "daunting task." "When I Get Home, You're So Dead" from Tales Told by Dead Friends was re-recorded because the song had previously received a big response from fans. Natalie VanLandingham provided additional vocals on "Jersey", while Daniel Lancaster provided additional vocals on "Jamie All Over". Mixing was done by Mark Needham, while Steve Hall mastered the album at Future Disc, located in McMinnville, Oregon. According to Mount, Lancaster's vocals for the album were "naked", implying no post recording editing had been done. Having 18 songs to choose from, they selected 12 tracks for the album, about 7-8 songs they considered "standouts that we all agreed on."

== Release ==
Lancaster left the band in April 2007, citing a lack of writing credit on the band's releases. (Note: Lancaster would later form Go Radio.) Lenzo and Bundrick filled in for Lancaster's vocals, while Garcia and Betts performed Lancaster's guitar parts. Garcia said this change made the guitars "sound more clear" and not "clutter[ed]"; on the other hand, the group found it hard working out who should sing Lancaster's parts. Lancaster's departure hurt Sanders personally as "he was a good friend". Later that month, the band supported Plain White T's on their U.S. tour. On April 4, "Black Cat" was made available for streaming via Hot Topic's Myspace profile. On April 13, the release of A Lesson in Romantics was announced. Between early May and late June, the band went on tour with support from Bedlight for Blue Eyes, Driver Side Impact, and Sick City. The track listing was revealed on May 18. On June 6, the band made "When I Get Home, You're So Dead" available for streaming via their Myspace profile. "Jamie All Over" was made available for streaming on June 19, via AbsolutePunk.

A Lesson in Romantics was made available for streaming through AOL, and was released the following day through Fearless Records. (Note: U.S. Fearless FRL 30099) Mayday Parade appeared at Dirt Fest in Birch Run, Michigan, before touring as part of the 2007 edition of Warped Tour from mid July to early August. In August, the band went on tour with Olympia and Sound the Alarm. The music video for "When I Get Home, You're So Dead", directed by Marco de la Torre, was filmed in September. In late September 2007, the band supported Paramore in Japan and Australia. The band went on a co-headlining tour with Madina Lake in October and November. The "When I Get Home, You're So Dead" music video was released on November 14, and the single was released on December 3. The band went on the Manwhores and Open Sores Tour alongside All Time Low, Every Avenue, and Just Surrender in January 2008. Between late January and late March, the band went on a package tour alongside Emery, As Cities Burn, Pierce the Veil and Cry of the Afflicted.

In April and May, the band went on the Explosions In Your Pants Tour with support from My American Heart and the Graduate. A music video was filmed for "Jamie All Over" in May, and the single was released on May 20. Mayday Parade went on the 2008 edition of Warped Tour, playing all summer-long for the first time. Sanders explained that the group "finally felt like one of the real bands" on Warped Tour; they "had a bus for the first time this year". Following this, Independent Label Group, who help promote and market Fearless releases, persuaded Target Corporation to sell A Lesson in Romantics in its stores. The video for "Jamie All Over" was released through MTV on July 21. The song was released to radio on September 2. In October and November, the band supported All Time Low on the Compromising of Integrity, Morality, & Principles in Exchange for Money tour. A music video for "Miserable at Best", directed by Mark Staubach, was released on January 9, 2009, on the band's Myspace.

=== Reissues ===
A Lesson in Romantics was reissued on April 28, 2008, featuring an acoustic version of "Three Cheers for Five Years", as well as "One Man Drinking Games". On November 21, 2011, the album was released on vinyl with a different colored cover. A white vinyl edition was released a year later, on August 28, 2012.

On January 1, 2017, the band launched a website under the name, alessoninromantics.com, teasing a 10 year anniversary tour for the album. On January 27, a new music video was released for "Black Cat", directed by Max Moore. A 10th anniversary edition of the album featuring demos was released on March 17. To celebrate the anniversary, the band performed the album in full on tour between March and May. A UK leg of the tour is set to take place in September.

The band also did commentary for every track on the album. Producer Kenneth Mount criticized the band on Twitter for not giving Lancaster credit in commentary, "I'm slightly confused why mayday parades commentary for lesson in romantics [sic] never mentions Jason Lancaster at all, voice of 50% of the album... Jason also recorded all his vocals naked for a lesson in romantics [sic], that should totally make the commentary. I've waited ten years for that".

== Reception and legacy ==
Professional ratings
Review scores
Source	Rating
AbsolutePunk	85%
Melodic	3/5 stars
Music Emissions	5/5 stars
The Skinny	1/5 stars
Sputnikmusic	4.5/5

A Lesson in Romantics is considered a fan favorite. Daniel Thompson of Music Emissions wrote that: "every song is spectacular on this album and is a potential hit." Despite its eventual success and acclaim, A Lesson In Romantics received little attention from professional music critics. Reviewers noted the improved sound from the band's debut EP, Tales Told by Dead Friends. Joe DeAndrea from AbsolutePunk.net wrote that: "after their unimpressive release of the EP Tales Told By Dead Friends in November, the band's back with their debut album that will surely become one of your most played of the Summer." Sputnikmusic reviewer Adam Knott gave the album a score of 4.5 out of 5, calling it "a hell of a lot better" than most pop-punk records. Pär Winberg of Melodic wrote, "it is well written material," however, he felt that "it doesn't contain one second of new thinking and that is quite boring to be honest." Neal Parsons of The Skinny gave the album a negative review, who criticized the band for recycling "the same idea - namely heartbreak," and called it a "deeply disappointing debut." Writing for Alternative Press, Lindy Smith said of the album in retrospect, "This album definitely didn't get enough recognition when it was released, especially considering how clever and amazing the lyrics are [...] There's not a single song this writer has skipped or gotten sick of, even after listening to it close to 500 times, if not more."

idobi Radio included the album on their best of 2007 list. "When I Get Home, You're So Dead" was ranked at number 194 on the New York Post's 2007 list of best songs to download. In 2008, the music video for "When I Get Home, You're So Dead" was nominated at the MTV Video Music Awards for Best Rock Video and Video of the Year. The album was number 42 on Rock Sound's The 51 Most Essential Pop Punk Albums of All Time list. It was also listed as one of the 25 most influential albums that define emo by Alternative Press. Cleveland.com ranked "Jamie All Over" at number 66 on their list of the top 100 pop-punk songs. TJ Horansky of Sleep On It said the album was an influence on his band.

Reflecting on the record, Derek Sanders said, "There's something really special about A Lesson In Romantics, and it's crazy to think back to the time when we recorded it and how young we were. Obviously, we had no idea where that record was going to take us, but it's got really strong songs and possesses that magic that can be so hard to capture in the studio."

== Commercial performance ==
A Lesson in Romantics debuted at number 8 on the Billboard Heatseekers Albums chart, staying on the chart for six weeks. The album finally dropped off on the chart dated March 1, 2008 before eventually returning on the chart on July 12. It stayed on the chart for 70 consecutive weeks. The album also charted on the Independent Albums chart, peaking at number 31. In January 2009, it was announced that the album had sold over 100,000 copies. The album would later become the band's biggest selling album, selling over 200,000 copies. A Lesson in Romantics and "Miserable at Best" were certified gold by the Recording Industry Association of America in December 2017. "Jamie All Over" was certified platinum by the RIAA in March 2024.

== Track listing ==
All songs written by Mayday Parade.

No.	Title	Length
1.	"Jamie All Over"	3:36
2.	"Black Cat"	3:23
3.	"When I Get Home, You're So Dead"	3:13
4.	"Jersey"	3:29
5.	"If You Wanted a Song Written About You, All You Had to Do Was Ask"	4:04
6.	"Miserable at Best"	5:16
7.	"Walk on Water or Drown"	3:29
8.	"Ocean and Atlantic"	3:30
9.	"I'd Hate to Be You When People Find Out What This Song Is About"	4:01
10.	"Take This to Heart"	4:07
11.	"Champagne's for Celebrating (I'll Have a Martini)"	3:56
12.	"You Be the Anchor That Keeps My Feet on the Ground, I'll Be the Wings That Keep Your Heart in the Clouds"	4:38
Total length:		46:42

Bonus tracks

Bonus tracks on 2008 reissue
No.	Title	Length
13.	"Three Cheers for Five Years (acoustic)" (taken from Punk Goes Acoustic 2)	4:53
14.	"One Man Drinking Games" (taken from Tales Told by Dead Friends)	4:39

10th anniversary edition bonus tracks
No.	Title	Length
13.	"Coming Back with Winter" (demo)	3:50
14.	"Black Cat" (demo)	3:23
15.	"If You Wanted a Song Written About You, All You Had to Do Was Ask" (demo)	3:57
16.	"Ocean and Atlantic" (demo)	3:31
17.	"Champagne's for Celebrating (I'll Have a Martini)" (demo)	3:54
18.	"You Be the Anchor That Keeps My Feet on the Ground, I'll Be the Wings That Keep Your Heart in the Clouds" (demo)	4:45

== Personnel ==
Personnel per 2008 reissue booklet.

Mayday Parade

- Derek Sanders – lead vocals
- Jeremy Lenzo – bass guitar, backing vocals
- Alex Garcia – lead guitar
- Brooks Betts – rhythm guitar
- Jake Bundrick – drums, backing vocals

Additional musicians

- Jason Lancaster – co-lead vocals and guitar on all songs
- Natalie VanLandingham – additional vocals on "Jersey"
- Daniel Lancaster – additional vocals on "Jamie All Over"

Production

- Zack Odom – producer, engineer
- Kenneth Mount – producer, engineer
- Mark Needham – mixing
- Steve Hall – mastering
- Kyle Crawford – art, design

== Charts ==
Chart performance for A Lesson in Romantics
Chart (2007)	Peak position
US Heatseekers Albums (Billboard)	8
US Independent Albums (Billboard)	31

== Certifications ==
Certifications for A Lesson in Romantics
Region	Certification	Certified units/sales
United States (RIAA)	Gold	500,000^{‡}
^{‡} Sales+streaming figures based on certification alone.
