= Jason Lancaster =

American singer-songwriter

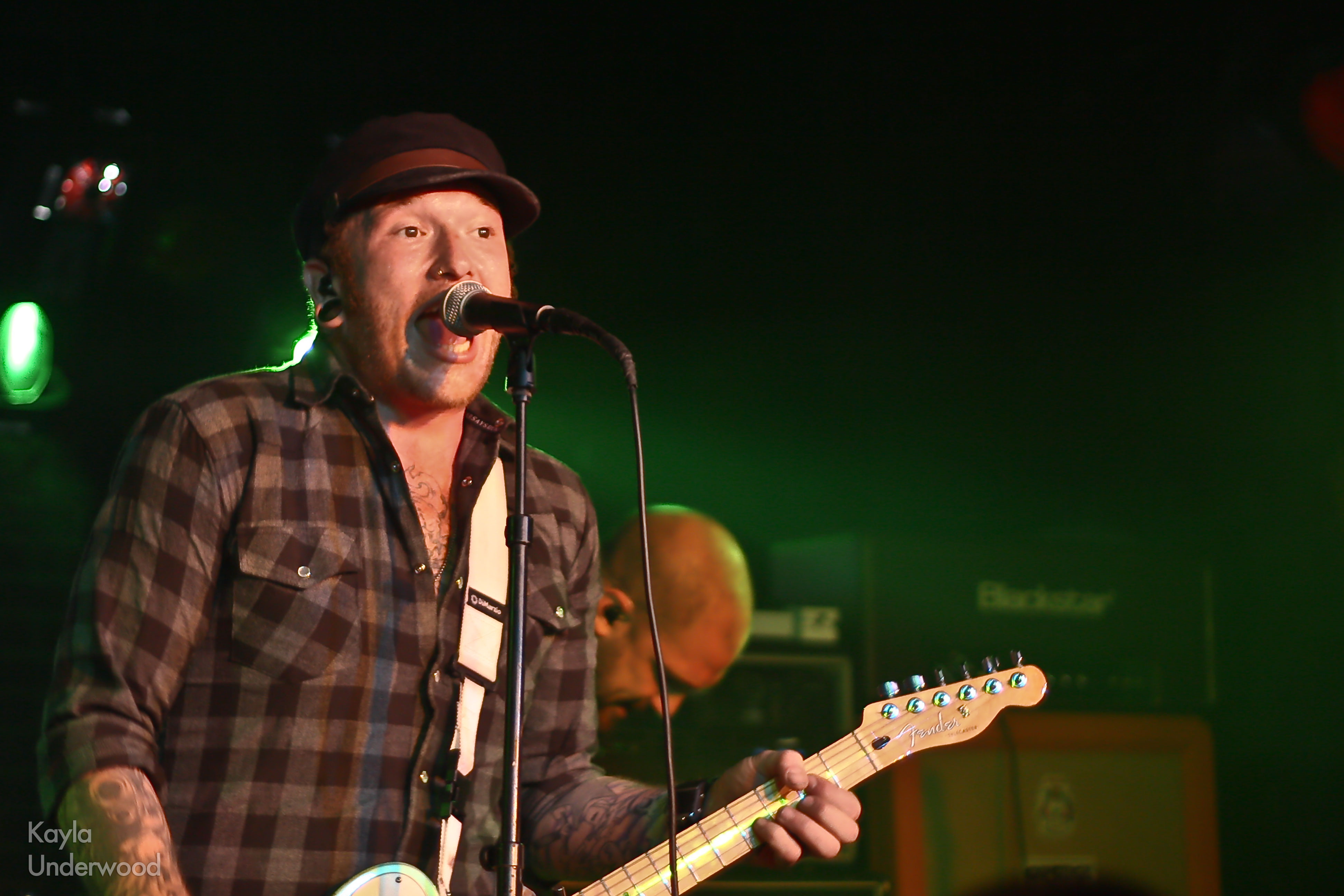

Background information
- Born: Jason Alan Lancaster; Tallahassee, Florida, U.S.
- Genres: Alternative rock; pop rock; pop punk; CCM
- Occupations: Musician; singer-songwriter
- Instruments: Vocals; piano; guitar
- Years active: 2005–present
- Labels: Outerloop; Fearless
- Formerly of: Mayday Parade; Go Radio

Jason Lancaster is an American singer-songwriter born in Tallahassee, Florida. He was the co-lead vocalist/rhythm guitarist in Mayday Parade as well as the lead vocalist/guitarist/pianist in Go Radio. Since Go Radio's breakup shortly after their participation in the Vans Warped Tour, Lancaster has pursued a solo career. He released his first self-titled album, As You Are, in 2014.

Lancaster in an article published by Alternative Press is quoted as saying:

I've finally reached a point of happiness that I couldn't possibly have hoped for in all my wildest expectations. I've reached a point where I've found a woman I love, who loves me in spite of all my faults (and trust me, there are many). I've got a family that is supportive, a future I can't wait to achieve, and a relationship with God ... Go Radio gave me an outlet to vent. It gave me a way to expose the things I meant, and a way to exorcise my personal demons while allowing me to still smile for all of you. I love you all and would never take back a moment that I've spent with any of you, but when it is time to move on we must. I've decided that it is, in fact, time for me to move on and I ask that you treat my decision with respect and courtesy.

On November 16, 2017, Lancaster released a worship album under the name Lncstr, entitled All the Things That Lead Us Home.

== Discography ==
Solo

- As You Are (2014)
- All the Things That Lead Us Home (2017)
- Say I'm What You Want (2020)
- God of Wonder (Acoustic) (EP) (2025)

With Mayday Parade

- Tales Told by Dead Friends (EP) (2006)
- A Lesson in Romantics (2007)

With Go Radio

- Welcome to Life (EP) (2008)
- Do Overs and Second Chances (EP) (2010)
- Lucky Street (2011)
- Close the Distance (2012)

Compilations

- Punk Goes Christmas (2013) with "All I Can Give You"

Collaborations

- A Day to Remember – Homesick (2009) co-writing "Have Faith in Me"
- Set It Off – Duality (2014) guest vocals on "Tomorrow"
- Chasing Safety – Season of the Dead (2014) guest vocals on "Through Winters"
