= Tales Told by Dead Friends =

EP by Mayday Parade
- Released: June 13, 2006
- Studios: Earthsound Recording, Valdosta, Georgia
- Genres: Emo; pop-punk
- Length: 26:58
- Label: Self-released

Mayday Parade chronology
Tales Told by Dead Friends (2006)	A Lesson in Romantics (2007)

Tales Told by Dead Friends is the debut EP by American rock band Mayday Parade, released on June 13, 2006. The group resulted from the merger of local acts Kid Named Chicago and Defining Moment. With their line-up solidified, the first two songs they wrote together were "When I Get Home, You're So Dead" and "Three Cheers for Five Years". Soon afterwards, they recorded an EP, Tales Told by Dead Friends, with Lee Dyess. The group followed Warped Tour and sold copies to people in line. By the end of summer, the band had sold 10,000 copies of the EP. This attracted the attention of Fearless Records, who would sign the band in late August. The group went on tour from September to November, before the EP was reissued by Fearless.

Told by Dead Friends has received a mixed response from critics. The EP has since sold over 50,000 copies. Several of the tracks would later be re-recorded for future albums/EPs or compilation albums. To celebrate the EP's 10th anniversary in 2016, the group went out on an anniversary tour and they re-released the EP with a bonus track, "The Problem with the Big Picture Is That It's Hard to See".

== Background and recording ==
Mayday Parade was formed in the winter of 2005 following the merger of two local Tallahassee bands, Kid Named Chicago and Defining Moment. Kid Named Chicago featured vocalist/guitarist Jason Lancaster, guitarist Alex Garcia and drummer Jake Bundrick, while Defining Moment featured vocalist Derek Sanders, guitarist Brooks Betts, and bassist Jeremy Lenzo. Both bands previously practiced in the same building, before it occurred to Lenzo that it "made more sense if we put them together instead of playing separately." After composing "When I Get Home, You're So Dead" and "Three Cheers for Five Years", the group realised they had "something special". Tales Told by Dead Friends was recorded at Earthsound Recording, in Valdosta, Georgia. Recording was handled by Lee Dyess, who also did mixing. Dan Shike mastered the EP at Tone and Volume Mastering in Nashville, Tennessee. The group recorded the EP "as fast as we could."

== Release ==
The EP, originally titled Music to Dance To, was self-released by the band on June 13, 2006. Friends of the artwork's photographer posed for the artwork. On the artwork, the arm and phone were taken in two different locations, because the photographer "didn't like the phone he was posing next to." The band followed the 2006 edition of Warped Tour, selling copies of the EP to people in line. By the end of summer, the group had sold 10,000 copies of the EP. These sales caught the attention of Fearless Records, which signed Mayday Parade on August 29. Fearless label president Bob Becker said the group: "were really believable, they were obviously good musicians, and they were really tight sounding. And we already knew they were hard-working." Between late September and early November, the band went on the Text on the Dance Floor tour with Mêlée, Wheatus, Brandtson, Lakes, and Fall of Transition. Tales Told by Dead Friends was re-released through Fearless on November 7. (Note: U.S. Fearless FRL 30095-2)

== Reception ==
Professional ratings
Review scores
Source	Rating
AllMusic	2.5/5 stars
Exclaim!	Favorable
Melodic	3/5 stars
PopMatters	5/10 stars

=== Critical response ===
AllMusic writer Corey Apar wrote that given the number of members in the band, their sound "should be much fuller sounding [...] instead of it being hard to even tell if there's more than one guitarist playing at a time." He explained that if they had better production, "this could easily be fixed". Despite this, Apar wrote that there is "still not a whole lot" to separate the group from other bands at the time. He compared Sanders and Lancaster's vocals to "sound[ing] pretty similar" to that of Fall Out Boy. Apar concluded that the EP was "a good starting point with a lot of potential".

Ariana Rock of Exclaim! opened her review with mentioning the EP's "catchy fun sound". She noted the "layered vocals, clean harmonies and mature musical dynamics" could help amass a large fan base. She concluded with calling the EP "the start of something big, without a doubt." PopMatters contributor Jason Macneil noted that the EP was "ringing with earnest melodies and Emo 101 trademarks". He called the band "a lighter Fall Out Boy or My Chemical Romance". He concluded with calling "The Last Something That Meant Anything", "the closest anyone has come to an emo-powered power ballad." Writing for Melodic, Kaj Roth said, "they've got potential of writing solid songs but perhaps this Florida based band should work a little harder on a more original sound because they sound a bit like hundreds of other bands." The EP has sold over 50,000 copies to date.

=== Legacy ===
"When I Get Home, You're So Dead" would later be re-recorded for their debut album, A Lesson in Romantics (2007). "Three Cheers for Five Years" was re-recorded acoustically for Punk Goes Acoustic 2. It was later released as a bonus track on the 2008 reissue of A Lesson in Romantics. "Your Song" was re-recorded acoustically for the band's Valdosta (2011) EP. A vinyl version was released on December 2, 2013, limited to 1,000 copies. To celebrate the EP's 10th anniversary, the band went on tour in November 2016 where they will perform the EP in its entirety. They were supported by Modern Chemistry. A 10th anniversary edition of the EP, featuring new packaging, a book and an additional track "The Problem with the Big Picture Is That It's Hard to See", was released on November 11. A day prior to the reissue, a music video for "The Problem with the Big Picture Is That It's Hard to See" was released. The video features highlights from the band's career.

In 2015, Alternative Press ranked "Three Cheers For Five Years" at number nine on their "10 Best Mayday Parade Songs" list.

== Track listing ==
All songs written and performed by Mayday Parade.

Standard edition
No.	Title	Length
1.	"Just Say You're Not into It"	4:21
2.	"When I Get Home, You're So Dead"	3:29
3.	"One Man Drinking Games"	4:39
4.	"Your Song"	3:57
5.	"Three Cheers for Five Years"	5:39
6.	"The Last Something That Meant Anything"	4:53
Total length:		26:58

10th anniversary edition bonus track
No.	Title	Length
7.	"The Problem with the Big Picture Is That It's Hard to See"	3:48

== Personnel ==
Personnel per booklet.

Mayday Parade

- Derek Sanders – lead vocals
- Jason Lancaster – co-lead vocals, guitar
- Alex Garcia – lead guitar
- Jeremy Lenzo – bass guitar, backing vocals
- Brooks Betts – rhythm guitar
- Jake Bundrick – drums

Production

- Lee Dyess – recording, mixing
- Dan Shike – mastering
- Jerrod Landon Porter – layout, photography

== Charts ==
Chart performance for Tales Told by Dead Friends
Chart (2016)	Peak position
US Vinyl Albums (Billboard)	12
