= Fearless Records discography =

Former Fearless Records logo

This article lists albums that were originally released by Fearless Records.

== Studio albums ==
=== 1990s ===
Artist	Release date	Album
Glue Gun	November 11, 1995	The Scene Is Not for Sale
Blount	March 15, 1996	Trauma
White Kaps	March 16, 1996	Blown in the U.S.A.
White Kaps	July 15, 1996	The Endless Bummer
The Aquabats	July 26, 1996	The Return of The Aquabats
The Grabbers	August 23, 1996	The Hand You're Dealt
Straight Faced	September 29, 1996	Guilty
Straight Faced	October 30, 1996	Broken
Drunk in Public	December 31, 1996	Tapped Out!
30footFALL	March 11, 1997	Acme-143
Bigwig	April 30, 1997	UnMerry Melodies
Chuck	September 16, 1997	Westward Ho!
Bickley	February 10, 1998	Pogo Au Go-Go (Re-release)
30footFALL	March 10, 1998	Divided We Stand
At the Drive-In	August 18, 1998	In/Casino/Out
Bickley	November 10, 1998	Kiss the Bunny
Gob	November 24, 1998	How Far Shallow Takes You (US Release)
Lonely Kings	July 13, 1999	What If?
Beefcake	October 1, 1999	Rejected
Dynamite Boy	October 12, 1999	Finder's Keeper's

=== 2000s ===
Artist	Release date	Album
Glasseater	August 8, 2000	7 Years Bad Luck
Junction 18	October 17, 2000	This Vicious Cycle
Dynamite Boy	March 20, 2001	Somewhere in America
Bigwig	March 20, 2001	An Invitation to Tragedy
Lonely Kings	November 27, 2001	Crowning Glory
Keepsake	June 11, 2002	Black Dress in a B Movie
Near Miss	July 9, 2002	The Gentle Art of Making Enemies
Glasseater	July 23, 2002	Glasseater
Knockout	October 15, 2002	Searching for Solid Ground
Anatomy of a Ghost	October 21, 2003	Evanesce
Sugarcult	April 13, 2004	Palm Trees and Power Lines
Brazil	April 20, 2004	A Hostage and the Meaning of Life
Dynamite Boy	May 18, 2004	Dynamite Boy
Plain White T's	January 25, 2005	All That We Needed
Gatsbys American Dream	April 12, 2005	Volcano
Yesterdays Rising	July 12, 2005	Lightworker
Sugarcult	November 15, 2005	Back to the Disaster
The Fully Down	November 22, 2005	Don’t Get Lost in a Movement
Portugal. The Man	January 24, 2006	Waiter: "You Vultures!"
Bigwig	February 7, 2006	Reclamation
So They Say	March 7, 2006	Antidote for Irony
Rock Kills Kid	May 16, 2006	Are You Nervous?
Portugal. The Man	July 18, 2006	Devil Say I, I Say AIR
Gatsbys American Dream	August 8, 2006	Gatsbys American Dream
Plain White T's	September 12, 2006	Every Second Counts
Sugarcult	September 12, 2006	Lights Out
A Static Lullaby	October 10, 2006	A Static Lullaby
Classic Case	February 20, 2007	Losing at Life
Alesana	March 20, 2007	On Frail Wings of Vanity and Wax
Mayday Parade	July 10, 2007	A Lesson in Romantics
Portugal. The Man	July 24, 2007	Church Mouth
So They Say	October 9, 2007	Life In Surveillance
Every Avenue	February 19, 2008	Shh. Just Go with It
Alesana	June 3, 2008	Where Myth Fades to Legend
The Maine	July 8, 2008	Can't Stop Won't Stop
A Static Lullaby	September 9, 2008	Rattlesnake!
Plain White T's	September 23, 2008	Big Bad World
Sparks The Rescue	May 5, 2009	Eyes to the Sun
A Skylit Drive	June 9, 2009	Adelphia
Eye Alaska	July 7, 2009	Genesis Underground
Let's Get It	August 4, 2009	Digital Spaces
Breathe Carolina	August 18, 2009	Hello Fascination
Mayday Parade	October 6, 2009	Anywhere But Here
Blessthefall	October 6, 2009	Witness
Every Avenue	November 3, 2009	Picture Perfect

=== 2010s ===
Artist	Release date	Album
Alesana	January 26, 2010	The Emptiness
Artist vs. Poet	March 2, 2010	Favorite Fix
The Maine	July 12, 2010	Black & White
For All Those Sleeping	July 20, 2010	Cross Your Fingers
The Word Alive	August 31, 2010	Deceiver
Motionless in White	October 12, 2010	Creatures
The Aquabats	January 18, 2011	Hi-Five Soup!
A Skylit Drive	February 15, 2011	Identity On Fire
Go Radio	March 1, 2011	Lucky Street
Sparks The Rescue	May 10, 2011	Worst Thing I've Been Cursed With
Let's Get It	May 24, 2011	Masters of the Universe
Breathe Carolina	July 12, 2011	Hell Is What You Make It
Every Avenue	August 2, 2011	Bad Habits
The Static Jacks	August 30, 2011	If You're Young
Breathe Carolina	September 27, 2011	Blackout: The Remixes
Mayday Parade	October 4, 2011	Mayday Parade
Blessthefall	October 4, 2011	Awakening
Tonight Alive	February 13, 2012	What Are You So Scared Of?
Eve 6	April 24, 2012	Speak in Code
Lostprophets	April 2, 2012	Weapons
For All Those Sleeping	June 19, 2012	Outspoken
The Word Alive	July 3, 2012	Life Cycles
Pierce the Veil	July 17, 2012	Collide with the Sky
Go Radio	September 18, 2012	Close the Distance
Upon This Dawning	October 23, 2012	To Keep Us Safe
Motionless in White	November 13, 2012	Infamous
The Summer Set	April 16, 2013	Legendary
Chunk! No, Captain Chunk!	April 30, 2013	Pardon My French
Forever The Sickest Kids	June 25, 2013	J.A.C.K.
Blessthefall	August 20, 2013	Hollow Bodies
Tonight Alive	September 10, 2013	The Other Side
Mayday Parade	October 8, 2013	Monsters in the Closet
Get Scared	November 11, 2013	Everyone's Out to Get Me
Breathe Carolina	April 15, 2014	Savages
The Word Alive	June 10, 2014	Real
The Downtown Fiction	June 17, 2014	Losers & Kings
For All Those Sleeping	June 23, 2014	Incomplete Me
Real Friends	July 22, 2014	Maybe This Place Is the Same and We're Just Changing
The Color Morale	September 2, 2014	Hold On Pain Ends
Motionless in White	September 16, 2014	Reincarnate
Oceans Ate Alaska	February 24, 2015	Lost Isles
As It Is	April 21, 2015	Never Happy, Ever After
Chunk! No, Captain Chunk!	May 18, 2015	Get Lost, Find Yourself
August Burns Red	June 29, 2015	Found in Far Away Places
Blessthefall	September 18, 2015	To Those Left Behind
Mayday Parade	October 9, 2015	Black Lines
Get Scared	October 30, 2015	Demons
Wage War	November 27, 2015	Blueprints
Ice Nine Kills	December 4, 2015	Every Trick in the Book
Tonight Alive	March 4, 2016	Limitless
The Summer Set	April 1, 2016	Stories For Monday
Pierce the Veil	May 13, 2016	Misadventures
Real Friends	May 17, 2016	The Home Inside My Head
The Color Morale	August 19, 2016	Desolate Divine
I Prevail	October 21, 2016	Lifelines
Ice Nine Kills	January 6, 2017	Safe Is Just a Shadow (Re-Shadowed and Re-Recorded)
As It Is	January 20, 2017	okay.
Grayscale	May 5, 2017	Adornment
Volumes	June 9, 2017	Different Animals
The White Noise	June 30, 2017	AM/PM
Sworn In	June 23, 2017	All Smiles
Oceans Ate Alaska	July 28, 2017	Hikari
Wage War	August 4, 2017	Deadweight
Varials	August 11, 2017	Pain Again
August Burns Red	October 6, 2017	Phantom Anthem
Movements	October 20, 2017	Feel Something
My Enemies & I	November 3, 2017	The Beast Inside
The Plot in You	February 16, 2018	Dispose
Milestones	February 28, 2018	Red Lights
Underoath	April 6, 2018	Erase Me
The Word Alive	May 4, 2018	Violent Noise
As It Is	August 10, 2018	The Great Depression
Plain White T's	August 24, 2018	Parallel Universe
Ice Nine Kills	October 5, 2018	The Silver Scream
Set It Off	February 1, 2019	Midnight
I Prevail	March 29, 2019	Trauma
Get Scared	April 19, 2019	The Dead Days
Eat Your Heart Out	May 17, 2019	Florescence
Wage War	August 30, 2019	Pressure
Grayscale	September 6, 2019	Nella Vita
Starset	September 13, 2019	Divisions
Capstan	September 20, 2019	Restless Heart, Keep Running
Varials	October 11, 2019	In Darkness
The Almost	October 18, 2019	Fear Caller
Locket	October 25, 2019	All Out
The Word Alive	February 21, 2020	Monomania
August Burns Red	April 3, 2020	Guardians

== Extended plays ==
Artist	Release date	Album
At the Drive-In	July 27, 1999	Vaya
Brazil	September 17, 2002	Dasein
Junction 18	September 17, 2002	Heroes from the Future
Rock Kills Kid	January 28, 2003	Rock Kills Kid
The Kinison	October 21, 2003	Mortgage Is Bank
Yesterdays Rising	October 5, 2004	When We Speak, We Breathe
So They Say	June 14, 2005	So They Say
Plain White T's	May 9, 2006	Hey There Delilah EP
Mayday Parade	November 7, 2006	Tales Told by Dead Friends
Every Avenue	August 14, 2007	Ah!
The Maine	December 11, 2007	The Way We Talk
The Morning Light	March 4, 2008	The Sounds of Love EP
Eye Alaska	June 17, 2008	Yellow & Elephant
Artist vs. Poet	November 18, 2008	Artist vs. Poet
The Maine	December 9, 2008	...And a Happy New Year
Motionless in White	February 17, 2009	When Love Met Destruction
The Word Alive	July 21, 2009	Empire
Go Radio	April 20, 2010	Do Overs and Second Chances
Amely	September 14, 2010	Hello World
The Aquabats	November 9, 2010	Radio Down!
Mayday Parade	March 8, 2011	Valdosta
Amely	April 19, 2011	Live Under Lights EP
Tonight Alive	November 8, 2011	Consider This
Real Friends	April 28, 2015	More Acoustic Songs
I Prevail	July 24, 2015	Heart vs Mind
My Enemies and I	September 25, 2015	Sick World
Movements	March 11, 2016	Outgrown Things

== Compilation albums ==
Artist	Release date	Album
Various Artists	1996	Punk Bites
Various Artists	March 18, 1997	Fearless Flush Sampler
Various Artists	December 5, 1997	Punk Bites 2
Various Artists	September 1, 1998	As a Matter of Fact
Various Artists	February 18, 1999	Serial Killer Compilation
The Aquabats	November 7, 2000	Myths, Legends, and Other Amazing Adventures Vol. 2
Various Artists	August 21, 2001	Don't Be Scared
Various Artists	July 23, 2002	Don't Be Scared, Vol. 2
Various Artists	2003	2003 and Beyond
At the Drive-In	May 24, 2005	This Station Is Non-Operational
Various Artists	November 22, 2010	'Tis the Season to Be Fearless

=== Punk Goes ===
Punk Goes... is a series of albums released by Fearless Records in which "punk rock" bands perform covers of songs from other genres. As of 2014, the series consists of sixteen compilation albums.

Though predominantly a series of cover albums, Punk Goes Acoustic, Punk Goes Acoustic 2 and Punk Goes Acoustic 3 completely deviate from this theme, featuring only acoustic versions of original songs by the featured bands, while 2013's Punk Goes Christmas features a mix of both Christmas-themed original songs and covers. Similarly, the series' first installment, 2000's Punk Goes Metal, consists entirely of covers with the exception of "Why Rock?" performed by The Aquabats, which was in fact an original song credited to a fictitious band called "Leather Pyrate".

Year	Title	Chart positions	
Year	Title	U.S.	U.S. Comp
2000	Punk Goes Metal: Released: August 1, 2000	—	—
2001	Punk Goes Pop: Released: April 3, 2001	—	—
2003	Punk Goes Acoustic: Released: October 21, 2003	—	—
2005	Punk Goes 80's: Released: June 7, 2005	—	18
2006	Punk Goes 90's: Released: May 9, 2006	186	10
2007	Punk Goes Acoustic 2: Released: May 8, 2007	125	5
2008	Punk Goes Crunk: Released: April 8, 2008	86	7
2009	Punk Goes Pop Volume Two: Released: March 10, 2009	15	—
2010	Punk Goes Classic Rock: Released: April 27, 2010	23	—
2010	Punk Goes Pop Volume 03.: Released: November 2, 2010	26	—
2011	Punk Goes X: Songs from the 2011 Winter X Games: Released: January 25, 2011	—	—
2011	Punk Goes Pop Volume 4: Released: November 21, 2011	92	—
2012	Punk Goes Pop Volume 5: Released: November 6, 2012	16	—
2013	Punk Goes Christmas: Released: November 5, 2013	95	—
2014	Punk Goes 90's Vol. 2: Released: April 1, 2014	41	—
2015	Punk Goes Pop Vol. 6: Released: November 17, 2014	19	—
2015	Punk Goes Christmas: Deluxe Edition: Released: November 27, 2015	—	—
2017	Punk Goes Pop Vol. 7: Released: July 14, 2017	—	—
2019	Punk Goes Acoustic Vol. 3: Released: July 26, 2019	—	—

== Videography ==
Artist	Release date	Name
The Aquabats	2003	A Double Disc DVD Of... Serious Awesomeness!
Pierce the Veil	November 25, 2013	This Is a Wasteland (documentary)

== See also ==
- Fearless Records official website
  - Fearless Records releases
