= List of Fearless Records artists =

This is a list of both current and former artists who have recorded for Fearless Records. Listed in parentheses are names of Fearless affiliated labels, under which the artist recorded.

== Current artists ==
- The Aquabats
- As It Is
- August Burns Red
- Breathe Carolina
- Bloodywood
- Chase Atlantic
- Chunk! No, Captain Chunk!
- The Color Morale
- The Downtown Fiction
- Eve 6
- For All Those Sleeping
- Forever the Sickest Kids
- Mayday Parade
- Motionless In White
- Pierce the Veil
- Plain White T's
- Real Friends
- The Summer Set
- Tonight Alive
- TSS
- Until I Wake

== Outerloop Records artist ==
- Chasing Safety
- Jason Lancaster
- Ice Nine Kills
- Youth in Revolt

== Old Friends Records artist ==
- Hellogoodbye

== Former artists ==
Active

- 30 Foot Fall (on It's Opposite Day And I Love You Records)
- Alesana (on Revival Recordings/Artery)
- Artist vs. Poet (Unsigned)
- Bigwig (Unsigned)
- Blessthefall (on Rise)
- Gob (Unsigned)
- I Dont Know How but They Found Me
- Portugal. The Man (on Atlantic)
- A Skylit Drive (on Tragic Hero)
- Sparks the Rescue (Unsigned)
- The Maine (on Universal)
- The Outline (Unsigned)
- Upon This Dawning (on Artery)
- Set It Off (Unsigned)

Inactive

- At the Drive-In
- Anatomy of a Ghost
- Amely
- Bazookas Go Bang!
- Beefcake
- Bickley
- Blount
- Brazil
- Chuck
- Classic Case
- Cruiserweight
- Dead Lazlo's Place
- Drunk In Public
- Dynamite Boy
- Every Avenue (Hiatus)
- Eye Alaska
- Family Values
- Fed Up
- The Fully Down
- Gatsbys American Dream
- Get Scared
- Glasseater
- Glue Gun
- Go Radio
- Grabbers
- Junction 18
- Jakiro
- Keepsake
- The Killing Moon
- The Kinison
- Knockout
- Let's Get It
- Logan Square
- Lonely Kings
- Lostprophets
- Sugarcult (Hiatus)
- The Morning Light
- Motherfist
- Near Miss
- Nipdrivers
- Red Fish
- Rock Kills Kid
- RPM
- So They Say
- The Static Jacks
- A Static Lullaby
- Straight Faced
- Superman Please Dont
- White Kaps
- Yesterdays Rising
