= Punk Goes Pop Vol. 7 =

Compilation album by "Punk Goes..."
- Released: July 14, 2017
- Recorded: Various
- Genre: Post-hardcore; alternative rock; pop-punk; metalcore; electronicore
- Length: 49:00
- Label: Fearless
- Producer: Various

"Punk Goes..." chronology
Punk Goes Christmas: Deluxe Edition (2015)	Punk Goes Pop Vol. 7 (2017)	Punk Goes Acoustic Vol. 3 (2019)

Singles from Punk Goes Pop Vol. 7
- 1. "That's What I Like" Released: June 1, 2017; 2. "Can't Feel My Face" Released: June 22, 2017; 3. "When We Were Young" Released: July 14, 2017; 4. "Love Yourself" Released: July 19, 2017

Punk Goes Pop Vol. 7 is the eighteenth compilation album in the Punk Goes... series by Fearless Records and the seventh installment in the Punk Goes Pop franchise. The album contains mainstream pop songs covered by thirteen bands from the pop punk, post-hardcore, metalcore, and alternative rock scenes. It was released via Fearless on July 14, 2017.

== Background and release ==
On May 31, 2017, the Punk Goes... Facebook page went dark speculating that a new Punk Goes... album was on the way. Nobody knew it was going to be a new Punk Goes Pop album until a day later. On June 1, 2017 it was announced on all social media and the official Punk Goes... website that Punk Goes Pop Vol. 7 would be announced as the new album of 2017. This was the first new Punk Goes... album in three years the last being Punk Goes Pop Vol. 6 back in 2014. Upon the announcement of Punk Goes Pop Vol. 7 Fearless Records also released the first single off the album a cover of "That's What I Like" originally by Bruno Mars performed by American rock band Dance Gavin Dance. The album was released on July 14, 2017 on Apple Music. It was also available for streaming on the Fearless Records YouTube channel on the same day. The album debuted at number 79 on the Billboard 200 and at number 12 on the US Top Alternative Albums charts.

== Singles ==
Since the release of Punk Goes Pop Vol. 7 the album has spawned four singles. The first which was released in promotion of the album was Dance Gavin Dance's cover of That's What I Like originally performed by Bruno Mars, it was released on June 1, 2017 alongside the announcement of the Punk Goes Pop Vol. 7, it was accompanied by a music video. The second single to be released off the album was The Amity Affliction's cover of Can't Feel My Face originally performed by The Weeknd, it was released on June 22, 2017. It was also accompanied by a music video depicting zombie teenagers walking around eating people in a school and a group of people trying to kill them. The band is seen playing on a stage in what seems to be an auditorium of the school and they also have become zombies. The third single to be released off the album was Andy Black and his wife Juliet Simms's cover of When We Were Young originally performed by Adele, it was released on July 14, 2017 in celebration of the release of Punk Goes Pop Vol. 7. It was also accompanied by a music video depicting Andy and his wife Juliet in a black and white movie singing a duet of When We Were Young. The fourth single to be released off the album was Grayscale's cover of Love Yourself originally performed by Justin Bieber, it was released on July 19, 2017 after the official release of Punk Goes Pop Vol. 7. The song's music video depicts teens singing in front of the band. As the band sings each of the audience members writes various flaws on each other's body with sticky notes. After that they are blown away by the lead singer of Grayscale with a leaf blower and the audience begins to dance around. At the end all the teens stick the notes to a wall creating a pattern of sorts. The meaning behind the video is to be yourself and don't let little things get to you and to love yourself for what you are not by what others think.

== Track listing ==
#	Title	Artist(s)	Original artist(s)	Length
1.	"Stitches"	STATE CHAMPS	Shawn Mendes	3:03
2.	"That's What I Like"	Dance Gavin Dance	Bruno Mars	3:27
3.	"Gangsta"	New Years Day	Kehlani	3:54
4.	"Can't Feel My Face"	The Amity Affliction	The Weeknd	3:21
5.	"When We Were Young"	Andy Black featuring Juliet Simms	Adele	4:45
6.	"Love Yourself"	Grayscale	Justin Bieber	3:26
7.	"Fake Love"	Capsize	Drake	3:10
8.	"Heathens"	Boston Manor	Twenty One Pilots	3:46
9.	"Shape of You"	Eat Your Heart Out	Ed Sheeran	3:56
10.	"Let It Go"	The Plot in You	James Bay	4:19
11.	"I Don't Wanna Live Forever"	Ice Nine Kills	ZAYN and Taylor Swift	4:24
12.	"Closer"	Seaway	The Chainsmokers featuring Halsey	4:12
13.	"In the Name of Love"	Too Close to Touch	Martin Garrix and Bebe Rexha	3:17

== Sampler track listing ==
Punk Goes Pop Vol. 7 also included a bonus sampler CD featuring previously released songs from the bands and artists signed to the label.

#	Title	Artist	Album	Length
1.	"Lifelines"	I Prevail	Lifelines	3:21
2.	"Picture Day"	The White Noise	AM/PM	3:21
3.	"Beautiful Things"	Grayscale	Adornment	4:16
4.	"Drag Me Down"	Eat Your Heart Out	Carried Away EP	2:27
5.	"Kept"	Movements	Outgrown Things EP	2:27
6.	"Call Me Disaster"	Milestones	Equal Measures EP	3:15
7.	"Stitch"	Wage War	Deadweight	3:26
8.	"Riot"	My Enemies & I	The Beast Inside	3:27
9.	"Feels Good"	Volumes	Different Animals	3:50
10.	"Make It Hurt"	Sworn In	All Smiles	3:44
11.	"Escapist"	Oceans Ate Alaska	Hikari	4:18

== Charts ==
Chart (2017)	Peak position
Australian Albums (ARIA)	10
US Billboard 200	79
US Top Alternative Albums (Billboard)	12
US Top Rock Albums (Billboard)	15

== Release history ==
Region	Date	Format
Worldwide	July 14, 2017	CD, digital
