= So They Say discography =

The following is the complete So They Say discography.

== Albums ==
=== Studio ===
Album information
Antidote for Irony
- Release date: March 7, 2006
- Label: Fearless Records
- Producer:
- Track listing: In Loving Memory Of..., Antidote for Irony, Anxiety Is Setting In, Good-Bye, In Essence We Are Falling, You Asked "Where Are We Now?", Over Exposed Photo, The Burden, Act Like You're Listening, Till It's Your Turn to Talk, Talking In Circles, A Beautiful Plan
Life in Surveillance
- Release date: September 25, 2007
- Label: Fearless Records
- Producer:
- Track listing: Just Forget My Name, These Nights Are Long, Wake Me Up, An Apology, I Won't Tell, Whisper of Sin, You're Welcome, Close Range, A Defeated Accomplishment, Hand of God, Nuclear Sunshine
- Additional content: Daydreamer (iTunes bonus track)
  - bonus disc: These Nights Are Long (Acoustic), Whisper of Sin (Alternate), I Won't Tell (Alternate), An Apology (Acoustic)

== EPs ==
=== Studio ===
Information
So They Say
- Release date: June 14, 2005
- Label: Fearless Records
- Producer:
- Track listing: Goodbye Goodbye, Midwest Island, Save Yourself, Drink of Poison, Slipping Away, Looking for Answers

== Singles ==
Release date	Title	Album
2006	Antidote for Irony	Antidote for Irony
2007	Wake Me Up	Life in Surveillance

== Other appearances ==
=== Albums ===
Album information
Punk Goes 80's
- Artist: Various
- Release date: June 7, 2005
- Label: Fearless Records
- So They Say track: Forever Young (Rod Stewart Cover)
Punk Goes '90s
- Artist: Various
- Release date: May 9, 2006
- Label: Fearless Records
- So They Say track: In Bloom (Nirvana Cover)
Take Action! Vol. 6
- Artist: Various
- Release date: February 27, 2007
- Label: Sub City Records
- So They Say track: Break the Silence

== Music videos ==
Music video information
Antidote for Irony
- Release date: 2006
- Label: Fearless Records
- Director:
Wake Me Up
- Release date: 2008
- Label: Fearless Records
- Director: Dan Dobi
