= Punk Goes Acoustic Vol. 3 =

Compilation album by "Punk Goes..."
- Released: July 26, 2019
- Genre: Acoustic rock; pop-punk; alternative rock; emo; pop rock
- Length: 47:03
- Label: Fearless
- Producer: Various

"Punk Goes..." chronology
| Punk Goes Pop Vol. 7 (2017) | Punk Goes Acoustic Vol. 3 (2019) |

Singles from Punk Goes Acoustic Vol. 3
- 1. "Wolf In Sheep's Clothing" Released: June 28, 2019; 2. "A Decade Under The Influence" Released: June 28, 2019

Punk Goes Acoustic Vol. 3 is the nineteenth compilation album in the Punk Goes... series created by Fearless Records and the third installment in the Punk Goes Acoustic series. This is the first album in the series since 2015 that features any tracks that are original (the last album to have any originals was Punk Goes Christmas: Deluxe Edition, which contained both original and covers of Christmas-themed songs done by bands). This is also first Punk Goes Acoustic album to be released by Fearless in over a decade the last being Punk Goes Acoustic 2 back in 2007. The album contains 12 unreleased acoustic versions of previously released original songs done by various bands such as Set It Off, Taking Back Sunday, Underoath, As It Is, and more. The album was announced via Fearless Records on June 28, 2019. The album was released on July 26, 2019.

== Background and release ==
On 27 June 2019, several music news outlets started reporting about a MySpace-themed press release received from Fearless Records. The press release consisted of a faux friend request. Clicking the "Accept" button would lead to the Punk Goes... web page, completely restyled to resemble the series' original MySpace page, including posts like “Hi MySpace!1!!! Welcome 2 my bl0g!!”. The page revealed Punk Goes Acoustic Vol. 3 would be the next release in the series. Similar to the "Top 8" feature on MySpace, the Punk Goes... page featured a "Top 12" section, listing the twelve artists featured on the compilation.

The day after, acoustic versions of "A Decade Under The Influence" and "Wolf In Sheep's Clothing" by Taking Back Sunday and Set It Off respectively were available on music platforms like Spotify and Apple Music. Apple Music listed the complete tracklist and revealed that the album is set for release on July 26, 2019.

== Singles ==
The album was announced on June 28, 2019 officially, but some of the songs from it were released ahead of a day earlier. The first two songs from the album were Set It Off's song "Wolf in Sheep's Clothing" from the band's second studio album Duality and the second was Taking Back Sunday's song "A Decade Under The Influence" from the band's second studio album Where You Want to Be. The songs were available to stream the day after on June 28, 2019 on the label's official YouTube channel.

== Track listing ==
| # | Title | Artist(s) | Original album | Length |
|---|---|---|---|---|
| 1. | "Story of My Bros" | Dance Gavin Dance | Artificial Selection | 3:06 |
| 2. | "Act Appalled" | Circa Survive | Juturna | 3:20 |
| 3. | "A Decade Under the Influence" | Taking Back Sunday | Where You Want to Be | 4:12 |
| 4. | "Screaming Infidelities" (feat. Abigail Sevigny) | Dashboard Confessional | The Swiss Army Romance | 4:28 |
| 5. | "Take This to Heart" | Mayday Parade | A Lesson in Romantics | 4:13 |
| 6. | "Colorblind" | Movements | Feel Something | 3:44 |
| 7. | "A Boy Brushed Red Living in Black and White" | Underoath | They're Only Chasing Safety | 4:47 |
| 8. | "Come Out to LA" | Don Broco | Technology | 3:11 |
| 9. | "Wolf in Sheep's Clothing" | Set It Off | Duality | 3:52 |
| 10. | "Okay" | As It Is | Okay | 3:54 |
| 11. | "Atlantic" | Grayscale | Adornment | 3:50 |
| 12. | "Hand Grenade" | The Almost | Monster Monster | 4:16 |
