= List of songs recorded by Pierce the Veil =

The following is a sortable table of all songs by Pierce the Veil:

- The column Song list the song title.
- The column Writer(s) lists who wrote the song.
- The column Album lists the album the song is featured on.
- The column Producer lists the producer of the song.
- The column Year lists the year in which the song was released.
- The column Length list the length/duration of the song.

== Studio recordings ==
Song	Writer(s)	Album	Producer	Year	Length
"(Don't Fear) The Reaper"^{[F]}	Buck Dharma	Punk Goes Classic Rock	Vic Fuentes, Jaime Preciado	2010	4:20
"A Match into Water"	Vic Fuentes	Collide with the Sky	Dan Korneff, Kato Khandwala	2012	3:33
"Beat It"^{[A]}	Michael Jackson	A Flair for the Dramatic	Vic Fuentes, Casey Bates	2007	3:39
"Bedless"	Vic Fuentes	Misadventures	Dan Korneff	2016	4:45
"Besitos"	Vic Fuentes, Mike Fuentes, Dave Yaden	Selfish Machines	Vic Fuentes, Mike Green	2010	4:22
"Bulletproof Love"	Tom Denney, Vic Fuentes	Selfish Machines	Vic Fuentes, Mike Green	2010	3:57
"Bulls in the Bronx"	Vic Fuentes, Mike Fuentes, Jaime Preciado, Tony Perry	Collide with the Sky	Dan Korneff, Kato Khandwala	2012	4:28
"Caraphernelia"	Tom Denney, Vic Fuentes	Selfish Machines	Vic Fuentes, Mike Green	2010	4:28
"Chemical Kids and Mechanical Brides"	Mike Fuentes, Vic Fuentes	A Flair for the Dramatic	Vic Fuentes, Casey Bates	2007	3:41
"Circles"	Vic Fuentes	Misadventures	Dan Korneff	2016	3:44
"Currents Convulsive"	Mike Fuentes, Vic Fuentes	A Flair for the Dramatic	Vic Fuentes, Casey Bates	2007	3:36
"Diamonds and Why Men Buy Them"	Vic Fuentes, Curtis Peoples	A Flair for the Dramatic	Vic Fuentes, Casey Bates	2007	3:31
"Disasterology"	Vic Fuentes, Mike Fuentes, Tom Denney	Selfish Machines	Vic Fuentes, Mike Green	2010	3:26
"Dive In"	Vic Fuentes	Misadventures	Dan Korneff	2016	4:52
"Drella"	Mike Fuentes, Vic Fuentes	A Flair for the Dramatic	Vic Fuentes, Casey Bates	2007	2:57
"Emergency Contact"	Curtis Peoples, Vic Fuentes	The Jaws Of Life	Paul Meany	2022	4:00
"Even When I'm Not With You"	Vic Fuentes	The Jaws Of Life	Paul Meany	2023	2:54
"Falling Asleep on a Stranger"	Vic Fuentes, Curtis Peoples	A Flair for the Dramatic	Vic Fuentes, Casey Bates	2007	3:44
"Fast Times at Clairemont High"	Tom Denney, Vic Fuentes	Selfish Machines	Vic Fuentes, Mike Green	2010	4:01
"Floral & Fading"	Vic Fuentes	Misadventures	Dan Korneff	2016	3:29
"Gold Medal Ribbon"	Vic Fuentes	Misadventures	Dan Korneff	2016	3:58
"Hell Above"	Vic Fuentes	Collide with the Sky	Dan Korneff, Kato Khandwala	2012	3:57
"Hold on Till May"	Vic Fuentes	Collide with the Sky	Dan Korneff, Kato Khandwala	2012	4:39
"Hold on Till May (Acoustic)"^{[E]}	Vic Fuentes	Collide with the Sky	Dan Korneff, Kato Khandwala	2012	4:42
"I Don't Care If You're Contagious"	Tom Denney, Vic Fuentes	Selfish Machines	Vic Fuentes, Mike Green	2010	3:24
"I'd Rather Die Than Be Famous"	Mike Fuentes, Vic Fuentes	A Flair for the Dramatic	Vic Fuentes, Casey Bates	2007	2:54
"I'm Low on Gas and You Need a Jacket"	Vic Fuentes	Collide with the Sky	Dan Korneff, Kato Khandwala	2012	4:12
"I'm Low on Gas and You Need a Jacket (Alternate version)"^{[D]}	Vic Fuentes	Collide with the Sky	Dan Korneff, Kato Khandwala	2012	3:40
"Just the Way You Are"^{[G]}	Bruno Mars, Philip Lawrence, Ari Levine, Khalil Walton, Khari Cain	Punk Goes Pop 4	John Feldmann	2011	3:43
"King for a Day"	Vic Fuentes	Collide with the Sky	Dan Korneff, Kato Khandwala	2012	3:57
"Kissing in Cars"^{[C]}	Vic Fuentes	Selfish Machines	Vic Fuentes, Mike Green	2010	4:17
"May These Noises Startle You in Your Sleep Tonight"	Vic Fuentes	Collide with the Sky	Dan Korneff, Kato Khandwala	2012	1:22
"Million Dollar Houses (The Painter)"	Vic Fuentes	Selfish Machines	Vic Fuentes, Mike Green	2010	4:01
"One Hundred Sleepless Nights"	Vic Fuentes, Mike Fuentes, Jaime Preciado, Tony Perry	Collide with the Sky	Dan Korneff, Kato Khandwala	2012	3:42
"Pass the Nirvana"	Curtis Peoples, David Dahlquist, Pat Morrissey, Paul Meany, Vic Fuentes	The Jaws Of Life	Paul Meany	2022	3:17
"Phantom Power and Ludicrous Speed"	Vic Fuentes	Misadventures	Dan Korneff	2016	3:51
"Props & Mayhem"	Vic Fuentes	Collide with the Sky	Dan Korneff, Kato Khandwala	2012	3:38
"Sambuka"	Vic Fuentes	Misadventures	Dan Korneff	2016	2:36
"She Makes Dirty Words Sound Pretty"^{[B]}	Vic Fuentes, Jonny Craig	Selfish Machines	Vic Fuentes, Jonny Craig	2010	3:51
"She Sings in the Morning"	Mike Fuentes, Vic Fuentes	A Flair for the Dramatic	Vic Fuentes, Casey Bates	2007	2:59
"Song for Isabelle"	Vic Fuentes	Misadventures	Dan Korneff	2016	4:51
"Southern Constellations"	Vic Fuentes	Selfish Machines	Vic Fuentes, Mike Green	2010	1:05
"Stained Glass Eyes and Colorful Tears"	Vic Fuentes	Collide with the Sky	Dan Korneff, Kato Khandwala	2012	3:39
"Stay Away from My Friends"	Tom Denney, Vic Fuentes	Selfish Machines	Vic Fuentes, Mike Green	2010	4:41
"Tangled in the Great Escape"	Vic Fuentes, Brian Southall, Jason Butler	Collide with the Sky	Dan Korneff, Kato Khandwala	2012	5:57
"Texas is Forever"	Vic Fuentes	Misadventures	Dan Korneff	2016	3:39
"The Balcony Scene"	Vic Fuentes, Curtis Peoples, Dave Yaden	A Flair for the Dramatic	Vic Fuentes, Casey Bates	2007	3:19
"The Boy Who Could Fly"	Vic Fuentes, Mike Fuentes, Tom Denney	Selfish Machines	Vic Fuentes, Mike Green	2010	5:08
"The Cheap Bouquet"	Mike Fuentes, Vic Fuentes	A Flair for the Dramatic	Vic Fuentes, Casey Bates	2007	3:49
"The Divine Zero"	Vic Fuentes	Misadventures	Dan Korneff	2015	4:09
"The First Punch"	Vic Fuentes, Mike Fuentes, Tom Denney	Collide with the Sky	Dan Korneff, Kato Khandwala	2012	3:26
"The New National Anthem"	Tom Denney, Vic Fuentes	Selfish Machines	Vic Fuentes, Mike Green	2010	4:00
"The Sky Under the Sea"	Vic Fuentes, Mike Fuentes, Tom Denney	Selfish Machines	Vic Fuentes, Mike Green	2010	4:36
"Today I Saw the Whole World"	Vic Fuentes	Misadventures	Dan Korneff	2016	3:42
"Wonderless"	Mike Fuentes, Vic Fuentes	A Flair for the Dramatic	Vic Fuentes, Casey Bates	2007	5:41
"Yeah Boy and Doll Face"	Mike Fuentes, Vic Fuentes	A Flair for the Dramatic	Vic Fuentes, Casey Bates	2007	4:24
"Karma Police"	Ed O’Brien, Colin Greenwood, Jonny Greenwood, Thom Yorke, Philip Selway	The Jaws Of Life(Deluxe)	Dan Korneff, Pierce the Veil	2024	4:28
"Kiss Me Now"	Vic Fuentes, Tony Perry, Jaime Preciado, Josh Rheault	The Jaws Of Life(Deluxe) (Single)	Paul Meany	2025	4:17
"Damn The Man, Save The Empire"	Vic Fuentes, Mike Fuentes, Curtis Peoples	The Jaws Of Life	Paul Meany	2023	3:57
"Flawless Execution"	Vic Fuentes	The Jaws Of Life	Paul Meany	2023	4:00
"The Jaws Of Life"	Vic Fuentes, Curtis Peoples, David Dahlquist, Pat Morrissey	The Jaws Of Life	Paul Meany	2023	3:42
