= Punk Goes Pop Volume 03. =

Compilation album by "Punk Goes..."
- Released: (United States) November 2, 2010
- Recorded: Various
- Genres: Post-hardcore; pop-punk; alternative rock; metalcore; electronicore; crunkcore; easycore
- Length: 53:27
- Label: Fearless
- Producer: Various

"Punk Goes..." chronology
Punk Goes Classic Rock (2010)	Punk Goes Pop Volume 03. (2010)	Punk Goes X (2011)

Singles from Punk Goes Pop Volume 03.
- 1. "Down" Released: September 16, 2010; 2. "Right Now (Na Na Na)" Released: September 29, 2010; 3. "In My Head" Released: October 14, 2010; 4. "Hot n Cold" Released: October 21, 2010

Professional ratings
Review scores
Source	Rating
Allmusic	2.5/5 stars

Punk Goes Pop Volume 03. is the tenth compilation album released from the Punk Goes... series created by Fearless Records and the third installment in the Punk Goes Pop franchise to feature various post-hardcore, metalcore and alternative rock bands covering mainstream pop songs. It was released on November 2, 2010. the album was also released with a bonus CD sampler which contains songs by various bands from the Rise and Fearless record labels. Additionally Japan's edition of the album contains two extra bonus tracks by Japanese bands covering pop songs. The album sold 18,000 copies.

== Track listing ==
A list of confirmed songs and artists was released on August 25, 2010, by Alternative Press.

#	Title	Artist	Original Artist(s)	Length
1.	"Down"	Breathe Carolina	Jay Sean featuring Lil Wayne	3:43
2.	"Hot n Cold"	Woe, Is Me	Katy Perry	3:07
3.	"Bad Romance"	Artist vs. Poet	Lady Gaga	4:54
4.	"In My Head"	Mayday Parade	Jason Derülo	3:41
5.	"Right Now (Na Na Na)"	Asking Alexandria	Akon	4:20
6.	"Paper Planes"	This Century	M.I.A.	3:23
7.	"Heartless"	The Word Alive	Kanye West	4:00
8.	"Bulletproof"	Family Force 5	La Roux	3:29
9.	"Blame It"	Of Mice & Men	Jamie Foxx featuring T-Pain	4:03
10.	"Run This Town"	Miss May I	Jay-Z featuring Kanye West and Rihanna	3:49
11.	"Airplanes"	The Ready Set	B.o.B featuring Hayley Williams of Paramore	2:37
12.	"Dead and Gone"	Cute Is What We Aim For	T.I. featuring Justin Timberlake	4:55
13.	"Need You Now"	Sparks the Rescue	Lady Antebellum	3:33
14.	"My Love"	We Came as Romans	Justin Timberlake featuring T.I.	3:53

=== Japanese Edition ===
The Japanese version contains the following two bonus tracks.

#	Title	Artist	Original Artist(s)	Length
15.	"Nothin' on You"	N E W B R E E D	B.o.B featuring Bruno Mars	4:28
16.	"Omen"	Crossfaith	The Prodigy	3:59

=== Bonus CD ===
1. "Epiphany" – The Word Alive (Fearless Records)
2. "Smokahontas" – Attack Attack! (Rise Records)
3. "Come Back to Me" – Amely (Fearless Records)
4. "We Are Life" – Emarosa (Rise Records)
5. "Creatures" – Motionless in White (Fearless Records)
6. "Surroundings" – My Ticket Home (Rise Records)
7. "I'm Not Dead Yet" – For All Those Sleeping (Fearless Records)
8. "Lost in Existence" – Scarlett O'Hara (Rise Records)
9. "Letters and Love Notes" - Go Radio (Fearless Records)
10. "Behind Locked Doors" - Ten After Two (Rise Records)
