= Punk Goes Pop Volume Two =

Compilation album by Punk Goes...
- Released: March 9, 2009
- Recorded: Various artists
- Genre: Post-hardcore; pop-punk; alternative rock; emo pop; metalcore; electronicore
- Length: 50:09
- Label: Fearless
- Producer: Various

Punk Goes... chronology
Punk Goes Crunk (2008)	Punk Goes Pop Volume Two (2009)	Punk Goes Classic Rock (2010)

Professional ratings
Review scores
Source	Rating
AbsolutePunk	(27%)
AllMusic	2.5/5 stars
Punknews.org	1.5/5 stars

Punk Goes Pop Volume Two is the eighth compilation album in the Punk Goes... series created by Fearless Records and the second installment in the Punk Goes Pop franchise to feature bands covering mainstream pop songs. It was released on March 9, 2009, in the United Kingdom and March 10, 2009, in the United States. The album debuted at number 15 on the Billboard 200, selling 21,000 copies in its first week.

The album's release was originally slated for February. However, due to the inclusion of the cover by Chiodos, the release date was pushed back a month. Those who pre-ordered the album from certain retailers received a free copy of the original Punk Goes Pop. The song "...Baby One More Time" was covered by Nicotine in the first Punk Goes Pop and by August Burns Red in this album. The album was posted on MTV's The Leak on March 3, 2009, where the full album was available for streaming.

== Track listing ==
A list of confirmed songs was released on December 17, 2008, revealing most of the artists that would appear on the compilation. On January 8, 2009, the official track listing was released.

#	Title	Artist	Original Artist(s)	Length
1.	"What Goes Around... Comes Around"	Alesana	Justin Timberlake	4:31
2.	"Apologize"	Silverstein	OneRepublic featuring Timbaland	2:55
3.	"...Baby One More Time"	August Burns Red	Britney Spears	3:10
4.	"When I Grow Up"	Mayday Parade	Pussycat Dolls	3:38
5.	"Over My Head (Cable Car)"	A Day to Remember	The Fray	3:31
6.	"Smooth"	Escape the Fate	Santana featuring Rob Thomas	3:58
7.	"Ice Box"	There for Tomorrow	Omarion featuring Timbaland	4:18
8.	"Flagpole Sitta"	Chiodos	Harvey Danger	3:39
9.	"Beautiful Girls"	Bayside	Sean Kingston	3:41
10.	"See You Again"	Breathe Carolina	Miley Cyrus	3:23
11.	"Disturbia"	The Cab	Rihanna	4:01
12.	"Toxic"	A Static Lullaby	Britney Spears	3:20
13.	"Love Song"	Four Year Strong	Sara Bareilles	3:03
14.	"I Kissed a Girl"	Attack Attack!	Katy Perry	3:00

== Charts ==
Chart	Peak position
The Billboard 200	15
