= Punk Goes 90s Vol. 2 =

Compilation album by "Punk Goes..."
- Released: April 1, 2014
- Recorded: Various
- Genre: Post-hardcore; pop-punk; alternative rock; metalcore; power pop
- Length: 47:42, (Japanese Edition) 41:41
- Label: Fearless
- Producer: Various

"Punk Goes..." chronology
Punk Goes Christmas (2013)	Punk Goes 90s Vol. 2 (2014)	Punk Goes Pop Vol. 6 (2014)

Singles from Punk Goes 90s Vol. 2
- 1. "My Own Worst Enemy" Released: January 7, 2014

Professional ratings
Review scores
Source	Rating
Alternative Press	3/5 stars
Punknews.org	2.5/5 stars

Punk Goes 90s Vol. 2 is the fifteenth compilation album in the Punk Goes... series and the second installment in the Punk Goes '90s series, the first being released in 2006. Each artist that appeared on the album was approached by Fearless Records to cover a song from the 1990s.

== Background and release ==
The album was announced by Fearless Records through a video teaser, posted on January 1, 2014, which also revealed that the first single from the album, to be released on January 7, would be Get Scared's cover of "My Own Worst Enemy" by Lit. It was announced on February 6 that the album would be released on April 1 the same year; the album's full track listing and artwork were released on the same day.

The next song released from the album was Asking Alexandria's cover of Nine Inch Nails' song "Closer", released on February 25. In March it was revealed that rock band Mayday Parade had been recording a music video for their cover of "Comedown" by Bush. The song itself was released on March 18, accompanied by its lyric video.

The album was officially released on April 1, along with the release of Chunk! No, Captain Chunk!'s music video for "All Star", originally by Smash Mouth. Smash Mouth themselves praised the band's cover and stated that they were excited for the new album. Music videos for Hands Like Houses' cover of "Torn" (Ednaswap) and Falling in Reverse's "Gangsta's Paradise" (Coolio) were also released.

Asking Alexandria chose to cover "Closer" due to its "gritty, dirty" sound. Guitarist Ben Bruce explained "Growing up in the '90s means that all of us have a soft spot for '90s jams from the weird and wonderful, to the cheesy boy bands to the dirty and grungy!" Falling in Reverse's cover of "Gangsta's Paradise" featured Ronnie Radke rapping.

Japan additionally received a second disk of Japanese artists covering American 90's songs. Artists featured included Artema, Before My Life Fails, Cleave, Fear From The Hate, A Ghost of Flare, Her Name In Blood, Lost, Make My Day, The Winking Owl, キバオブアキバ and ヒステリックパニック.

== Critical reception ==
Brian Kraus of the Alternative Press stated that not one song from the album sounded like it was recorded in the 1990s, going on to say that Chunk! No, Captain Chunk!'s "All Star" was one of the highlights of the album, despite it being "corny". He also praised The Color Morale's approach to the Foo Fighters song "Everlong" and gave the album 3/5 stars overall, stating "Vol. 2 is worth a visit, because with covers, sometimes even the trainwrecks are entertaining."

== Track listing ==
#	Title	Artist	Original artist(s)	Length
1.	"My Own Worst Enemy"	Get Scared	Lit	3:01
2.	"Interstate Love Song"	Memphis May Fire	Stone Temple Pilots	3:14
3.	"Closer"	Asking Alexandria	Nine Inch Nails	6:21
4.	"Everlong"	The Color Morale	Foo Fighters	4:02
5.	"All Star"	Chunk! No, Captain Chunk!	Smash Mouth	3:20
6.	"Comedown"	Mayday Parade	Bush	5:32
7.	"Du Hast"	Motionless in White	Rammstein	3:57
8.	"Today"	Yellowcard	The Smashing Pumpkins	3:22
9.	"Torn"	Hands Like Houses	Ednaswap (as covered by Natalie Imbruglia)	3:47
10.	"Southtown"	The Ghost Inside	P.O.D.	4:09
11.	"Gangsta’s Paradise"	Falling in Reverse	Coolio featuring L.V.	3:54
12.	"Good Riddance (Time of Your Life)"	Ice Nine Kills	Green Day	3:03

=== Japanese Edition ===
The Japan Edition contained a second CD which included 11 tracks by various Japanese bands covering American songs from the 1990s.

#	Title	Artist	Original Artist(s)	Length
1.	"Guerrilla Radio"	Before My Life Fails	Rage Against the Machine	3:32
2.	"Heart-Shaped Box"	The Winking Owl	Nirvana	3:57
3.	"Nookie"	Lost	Limp Bizkit	3:41
4.	"Pretty Fly (For a White Guy)"	Her Name in Blood	The Offspring	3:14
5.	"Believe"	Artema	Cher	3:27
6.	"Around the World"	Hysteric Panic	Red Hot Chili Peppers	3:30
7.	"I Don't Want To Miss A Thing"	Make My Day	Aerosmith	3:38
8.	"A Whole New World"	Kiba of Akiba	Regina Belle and Peabo Bryson	4:16
9.	"Rock Is Dead"	Fear from the Hate	Marilyn Manson	4:15
10.	"Falling Away from Me	A Ghost of Flare	Korn	4:00
11.	"Don't Look Back in Anger"	Cleave	Oasis	4:16

== Sampler Track listing ==
Punk Goes 90s Vol. 2 also included a bonus sampler CD with every physical copy of the album when bought through Alternative Press. The sampler CD contains 10 previous released songs by bands from the Fearless Records label.

#	Title	Artist	Album	Length
1.	"Savages"	Breathe Carolina	Savages	3:21
2.	"Hollow Bodies"	Blessthefall	Hollow Bodies	4:18
3.	"Badly Broken"	Get Scared	Everyone's Out To Get Me	3:24
4.	"Hold Onto Me"	Mayday Parade	Monsters in the Closet	3:14
5.	"Late Nights In My Car"	Real Friends	Put Yourself Back Together EP	3:21
6.	"Haters Gonna Hate"	Chunk! No, Captain Chunk!	Pardon My French	3:23
7.	"Some Place On Earth"	The Downtown Fiction	Losers & Kings	3:38
8.	"Sick From The Melt"	Motionless in White Featuring Trevor Friedrich of Combichrist	Infamous	3:23
9.	"(Everything) Is Debatable"	Hellogoodbye	Everything Is Debatable	3;59
10.	"The Power in Belief"	Ice Nine Kills	The Predator Becomes the Prey	3:39

== Charts and release history ==
Charts

Chart	Peak position
The Billboard 200	41
Top Hard Rock Albums	7
Top Independent Albums	8
Top Modern Rock/Alternative Albums	10
Top Rock Albums	13

Releases

Region	Date	Format
Worldwide	April 1, 2014	CD, CS, DL, LP
