= Weapons (Lostprophets album) =

Studio album by Lostprophets
- Released: June 19, 2012
- Recorded: May–November 2011
- Studio: NRG Recording Studios, Hollywood
- Genre: Alternative rock, alternative metal, hard rock
- Length: 51:07
- Label: Fearless
- Producer: Ken Andrews

Lostprophets chronology
The Betrayed (2010)	Weapons (2012)

Weapons is the fifth and final studio album by Welsh rock band Lostprophets. The album was released on June 19, 2012.

== Track listing ==
No.	Title	Length
1.	"Bring 'Em Down"	4:09
2.	"We Bring an Arsenal"	3:26
3.	"Another Shot"	4:08
4.	"Jesus Walks"	4:35
5.	"A Song for Where I'm From"	3:52
6.	"A Little Reminder That I'll Never Forget"	4:16
7.	"Better Off Dead"	3:37
8.	"Heart on Loan"	4:08
9.	"Somedays"	3:42
10.	"Can't Get Enough"	15:14
Total length:		51:07
