= Punk Goes Acoustic =

Compilation album by "Punk Goes..."
- Released: October 21, 2003
- Recorded: Various
- Genre: Acoustic rock; pop-punk; punk rock; emo
- Length: 76:40
- Label: Fearless
- Producer: Various

"Punk Goes..." chronology
Punk Goes Pop (2002)	Punk Goes Acoustic (2003)	Punk Goes 80's (2005)

Professional ratings
Review scores
Source	Rating
Allmusic	3/5 stars

Punk Goes Acoustic is the third album in the Punk Goes... series and the first installment in the Punk Goes Acoustic series created by Fearless Records. It contains a collection of both previously released and unreleased songs by various artists performing acoustically. It was packaged with a bonus CD showcasing acts on the Fearless and Victory record labels. The album was released on October 21, 2003. It was the first Punk Goes... album to deviate from the theme of performing cover songs, though it was not the first to feature an original song, following The Aquabats' "Why Rock?" on Punk Goes Metal. As of 2019, there are three albums in the franchise.

== Track listing ==
#	Title	Artist	Original album	Length
1.	"Time to Talk"	Open Hand		3:58
2.	"Trust"	Thrice	The Illusion of Safety	2:40
3.	"Firewater"	Yellowcard and Baron Bodnar		3:22
4.	"Memory"	Sugarcult	Palm Trees and Power Lines	3:43
5.	"Letters to You"	Finch	What It Is to Burn	3:46
6.	"A Hole In the World"	Thursday	Full Collapse	5:34
7.	"Playing Favorites"	The Starting Line	The Make Yourself at Home EP	4:03
8.	"Velvet Alley"	Strung Out	An American Paradox	4:17
9.	"Eight of Nine"	The Ataris	So Long, Astoria	2:45
10.	"Cute Without the 'E' (Cut from the Team)"	Taking Back Sunday	Tell All Your Friends	4:26
11.	"Chloroform Perfume"	From Autumn to Ashes	Too Bad You're Beautiful	5:00
12.	"Swing Life Away"	Rise Against		2:26
13.	"The King"	Piebald		4:36
14.	"Over It"	Rufio	MCMLXXXV	1:54
15.	"Chalk Line"	Strike Anywhere	Change Is a Sound	4:18
16.	"Away to the Heart"	Noise Ratchet	Till We Have Faces	3:39
17.	"Blue Collar Lullaby"	Coalesce		4:42
18.	"Gathering Darkness"	Grade		5:00
19.	"Alone In the World"	Glasseater		3:41
20.	"Knew It All Along"	Midtown	Save the World, Lose the Girl	2:51

=== Bonus CD ===
1. "Onto Morning Stars" – Anatomy of a Ghost (Fearless Records)
2. "Still Standing" – Rock Kills Kid (Fearless Records)
3. "New Way to Dance" – The Kinison (Fearless Records)
4. "Anything" – Plain White T's (Fearless Records)
5. "Taking It All Back" – Count the Stars (Victory Records)
6. "Shevanel Take 2" – Between the Buried and Me (Victory Records)
7. "I Loved the Way She Said L.A." – Spitalfield (Victory Records)
8. "Giving Up" – Silverstein (Victory Records)
