= Punk Goes X =

Punk Goes X: Songs from the 2011 Winter X Games

Compilation album by "Punk Goes..."
- Released: January 25, 2011
- Recorded: Various
- Genres: Post-hardcore; pop-punk; alternative rock; emo pop; metalcore; electronicore
- Length: 40:56
- Label: Fearless
- Producer: Various

"Punk Goes..." chronology
Punk Goes Pop Volume 03. (2010)	Punk Goes X: Songs from the 2011 Winter X Games (2011)	Punk Goes Pop Volume 4 (2011)

Punk Goes X: Songs from the 2011 Winter X Games is the eleventh compilation album released from the Punk Goes... series created by Fearless Records. It was released on January 25, 2011, and features cover songs that were featured at the 2011 Winter X Games.

All the songs on the compilation have previously appeared on either Punk Goes Classic Rock or Punk Goes Pop Volume 03., with the exception of the first 2 tracks by The Word Alive and Sparks the Rescue, which are new tracks recorded for this particular compilation.

== Track listing ==
#	Title	Artist	Original Artist(s)	Length
1.	"Over the Mountain"	The Word Alive	Ozzy Osbourne	4:21
2.	"Mountain Song"	Sparks the Rescue	Jane's Addiction	4:12
3.	"Down"	Breathe Carolina	Jay Sean featuring Lil Wayne	3:43
4.	"Pour Some Sugar on Me"	The Maine	Def Leppard	3:59
5.	"Paper Planes"	This Century	M.I.A.	3:23
6.	"More Than a Feeling"	Hit the Lights	Boston	2:43
7.	"Run This Town"	Miss May I	Jay-Z featuring Rihanna and Kanye West	3:49
8.	"Caught Up in You"	We the Kings	.38 Special	4:04
9.	"Heartless"	The Word Alive	Kanye West	4:00
10.	"Take Me Home Tonight"	Every Avenue featuring Juliet Simms formerly of Automatic Loveletter	Eddie Money featuring Ronnie Spector of The Ronettes	3:35
11.	"Hot n Cold"	Woe, Is Me	Katy Perry	3:07
