= Are You Nervous? =

Studio album by Rock Kills Kid
- Released: 25 April 2006
- Genres: Alternative rock; indie rock; electronic rock; art punk; pop rock
- Length: 37:33
- Labels: Fearless; Reprise
- Producer: Mark Trombino

Rock Kills Kid chronology
Rock Kills Kid EP (2003)	Are You Nervous? (2006)

Singles from Are You Nervous?
- 1. "Paralyzed" Released: 2006; 2. "Hideaway" Released: 2006

Professional ratings
Review scores
Source	Rating
AbsolutePunk	Recommended
Allmusic	4/5 stars

Are You Nervous? is the only studio album by Rock Kills Kid, released on 25 April 2006 in the United States. "Paralyzed" was released as a single and reached number 12 on the US Modern Rock Tracks chart.

== Track listing ==
1. "Paralyzed" – 3:04
2. "Hideaway" – 4:01
3. "Midnight" – 3:34
4. "Are You Nervous?" – 3:15
5. "Back to Life" – 4:32
6. "Life's a Bitch" – 3:57
7. "Run Like Hell" – 3:59
8. "Don't Want to Stay" – 3:18
9. "Hope Song" – 3:59
10. "Raise Your Hands" – 3:54
11. "I Need You" (bonus track) – 4:10
