= Punk Goes Pop Volume 4 =

Compilation album by "Punk Goes..."
- Released: November 22, 2011
- Recorded: Various
- Genre: Post-hardcore; pop-punk; alternative rock; metalcore; electronicore; easycore; melodic hardcore
- Length: 55:05
- Label: Fearless
- Producer: Various

"Punk Goes..." chronology
Punk Goes X (2011)	Punk Goes Pop Volume 4 (2011)	Punk Goes Pop Volume 5 (2012)

Singles from Punk Goes Pop Volume 4
- 1. "Just the Way You Are" Released: October 18, 2011; 2. "Last Friday Night (T.G.I.F.)" Released: November 8, 2011; 3. "Rolling in the Deep" Released: 2012

Professional ratings
Review scores
Source	Rating
AllMusic	2.5/5 stars
Alter the Press!	(2/5)
AltSounds	(Favourable)
Punknews.org	3/5 stars

Punk Goes Pop Volume 4 is the twelfth compilation album in the Punk Goes... series created by Fearless Records and the fourth installment in the Punk Goes Pop franchise to feature bands covering mainstream pop music. It was released on November 22, 2011 through Fearless Records. On September 22, 2011, MTV Buzzworthy announced the album's full track list. The album also included a second bonus sampler CD containing songs by bands from Fearless' record label.

Punk Goes Pop Volume 4 spawned three singles: Pierce the Veil's cover of "Just the Way You Are", Woe, Is Me's cover of "Last Friday Night (T.G.I.F.)", and Go Radio's cover of "Rolling in the Deep".

The album debuted at number 92 on the Billboard 200.

Additionally Japan's edition of the album contains three extra bonus tracks by Japanese bands covering pop songs.

== Track listing ==
#	Title	Artist	Original Artist(s)	Length
1.	"Just the Way You Are"	Pierce the Veil	Bruno Mars	3:43
2.	"Little Lion Man"	Tonight Alive	Mumford & Sons	3:53
3.	"Last Friday Night (T.G.I.F.)"	Woe, Is Me featuring Cameron Mizell of She Can't Breathe	Katy Perry	4:02
4.	"Roll Up"	The Ready Set featuring MOD SUN	Wiz Khalifa	3:22
5.	"F**k You!"	Sleeping with Sirens	Cee Lo Green	3:33
6.	"Rolling in the Deep"	Go Radio	Adele	3:56
7.	"You Belong with Me"	For All Those Sleeping	Taylor Swift	3:50
8.	"We R Who We R"	Chunk! No, Captain Chunk!	Ke$ha	3:26
9.	"Love the Way You Lie"	A Skylit Drive	Eminem featuring Rihanna	4:57
10.	"Yeah 3X"	Allstar Weekend	Chris Brown	3:58
11.	"Till the World Ends"	I See Stars	Britney Spears	4:05
12.	"Runaway"	Silverstein featuring Camm Hunter of Down with Webster	Kanye West featuring Pusha T	8:44
13.	"Super Bass"	The Downtown Fiction	Nicki Minaj	3:37

=== Japanese Edition ===
The Japanese version contains the following three bonus tracks.

#	Title	Artist	Original Artist(s)	Length
14.	"Raise Your Glass"	N E W B R E E D	P!nk	3:31
15.	"What the Hell"	Ashley Scared the Sky	Avril Lavigne	3:51
16.	"Poker Face"	HER NAME IN BLOOD	Lady Gaga	3:50

== Sampler Track listing ==
Punk Goes Pop Volume 4 also included a bonus sampler CD containing 8 previous released songs by bands from the Fearless Record label.

#	Title	Artist	Original Album	Length
1.	"Wooly"	Breathe Carolina	Hell Is What You Make It	3:51
2.	"Fall Apart"	Every Avenue	Bad Habits	3:21
3.	"Goodnight Moon"	Go Radio	Lucky Street	5:04
4.	"The Cali Buds"	A Skylit Drive	Identity on Fire	3:40
5.	"In Friends We Trust"	Chunk! No, Captain Chunk!	Something for Nothing	3:28
6.	"Promised Ones"	Blessthefall	Awakening	3:38
7.	"Immaculate Misconception"	Motionless in White	Creatures	3:56
8.	"Worst Thing I've Been Cursed With"	Sparks the Rescue	Worst Thing I've Been Cursed With	3:33
9.	"I'm Not Dead Yet"	For All Those Sleeping	Cross Your Fingers	3:14
10.	"2012"	The Word Alive	Deceiver	3:02
