= Punk Goes Pop Vol. 6 =

Compilation album by "Punk Goes..."
- Released: November 17, 2014
- Recorded: Various
- Genre: Post-hardcore; pop-punk; alternative rock; metalcore; deathcore; power pop
- Length: 48:21
- Label: Fearless
- Producer: Various

"Punk Goes..." chronology
Punk Goes 90s Vol. 2 (2014)	Punk Goes Pop Vol. 6 (2014)	Punk Goes Christmas: Deluxe Edition (2015)

Singles from Punk Goes Pop Vol. 6
- 1. "I Knew You Were Trouble" Released: October 13, 2014; 2. "Ain't It Fun" Released: November 4, 2014; 3. "Turn Down for What" Released: November 16, 2014

Punk Goes Pop Vol. 6 is a compilation album in the Punk Goes... series created by Fearless Records.

== Track listing ==
#	Title	Artist	Original artist(s)	Length
1.	"Ain't It Fun"	Tyler Carter featuring Luke Holland of The Evening	Paramore	3:48
2.	"Wrecking Ball"	August Burns Red	Miley Cyrus	4:13
3.	"I Knew You Were Trouble"	We Came as Romans	Taylor Swift	3:38
4.	"Turn Down for What"	Upon a Burning Body featuring Ice-T of Body Count	DJ Snake and Lil Jon	3:42
5.	"Problem"	Set It Off	Ariana Grande featuring Iggy Azalea	2:59
6.	"Burn"	Crown the Empire	Ellie Goulding	3:48
7.	"Drunk in Love"	Oceans Ate Alaska	Beyoncé featuring Jay-Z	3:24
8.	"Royals"	Youth in Revolt	Lorde	3:25
9.	"Hold On, We're Going Home"	VOLUMES	Drake featuring Majid Jordan	4:05
10.	"Chocolate"	Knuckle Puck	The 1975	3:52
11.	"Sweater Weather"	Slaves	The Neighbourhood	3:51
12.	"Stay the Night"	STATE CHAMPS	Zedd featuring Hayley Williams of Paramore	3:32
13.	"Happy"	Palisades	Pharrell Williams	4:09

- Set It Off's cover of "Problem" samples "No Scrubs" by TLC. This sample was removed in the 2015 re-release.
- Upon a Burning Body and Ice-T's cover of "Turn Down For What" is not included in the 2015 re-release.

2015 re-release

#	Title	Artist	Original artist(s)	Length
13.	"Blank Space"	I Prevail	Taylor Swift	4:01
14.	"Chandelier"	PVRIS	Sia	3:37
15.	"Animals"	Ice Nine Kills	Maroon 5	4:16

== Sampler Track listing ==
Punk Goes Pop Vol. 6 also included a bonus sampler CD with every physical copy of the album when bought through Alternative Press. The sampler CD contains 13 previous released songs by bands from the Fearless Records label.

#	Title	Artist	Album	Length
1.	"Blood Brothers"	Oceans Ate Alaska	Lost Isles	3:32
2.	"Prey for Me"	The Color Morale	Hold On Pain Ends	3:37
3.	"Unstoppable"	Motionless in White	Reincarnate	3:26
4.	"Stuck in Remission"	Mayday Parade	Monsters in the Closet	3:23
5.	"My Nightmare"	Get Scared	Everyone's Out To Get Me	3:54
6.	"Glass Castle"	The Word Alive	REAL.	3:50
7.	"Legendary"	The Summer Set	Legendary	5:08
8.	"Hollow Bodies"	Blessthefall	Hollow Bodies	4:18
9.	"I Don't Love You Anymore"	Real Friends	Maybe This Place Is the Same and We're Just Changing	3:25
10.	"Poison Party (Famous)"	For All Those Sleeping	Incomplete Me	4:02
11.	"Kids"	Chunk! No, Captain Chunk!	Pardon My French (Deluxe Edition)	3:35
12.	"The Power in Belief"	Ice Nine Kills	The Predator Becomes the Prey	3:39
13.	"Love Is a Liar's Game"	Youth In Revolt	Love Is A Liar's Game	3:14

== Chart performance ==
=== Year-end charts ===
Chart (2015)	Position
U.S. Billboard Hard Rock Albums	29
