= Bedlight for Blue Eyes =

American alternative rock band

- Origin: New Jersey
- Genres: Alternative rock; pop rock; emo (early)
- Years active: 2004–2009
- Label: Trustkill Records
- Members: Daniel Rinaldi; Derek Weber; Itzhak Bishburg; Dan Taylor
- Past members: James Granuzzo; Christian Guerrero; Justin Ortiz; Joe Oliger

Bedlight for Blue Eyes (stylized as BEDlight For BlueEYES) was an alternative rock band from Berkeley Heights, New Jersey signed to Trustkill Records.

The band's musical style is post-hardcore with vocals that are influenced by glam metal. They are considered by some to be a "scene band".

== History ==
In June and July 2005, the band embarked on their first headlining tour, with support from the Higher, My Epiphany and Secret Lives of the Freemasons. Their debut album, The Dawn, was released in August 2005; the album reached No. 45 on the Billboard Heatseekers chart. In September and October 2005, they went on tour with labelmates Roses Are Red, alongside Stutterfly and Bleed the Dream. In October 2005, guitarist Justin Ortiz left the band to pursue alternative rock project Boy vs. Ghost. Not too long after, original vocalist Christian Guerrero left as well. Most recently, Bedlight's bassist and founding member James Granuzzo also left the band.

They went on an East Coast tour with Scary Kids Scaring Kids in November 2005. They also contributed to the Punk Goes 90's album, doing a version of Third Eye Blind's "Jumper" with their original band lineup. It prominently features a piano played by Sebastian Davin of Dropping Daylight throughout the song, and less guitar than the original.

As of 2007, the band has reformed with several new members, and recorded a second album, Life on Life's Terms, at Tree Sound Studios in the United States state of Georgia. The band's 2007 effort, Life on Life's Terms, leaked onto the Internet on July 4, 2007 from an unknown source six days before it was officially released. The record was released on Trustkill on July 10, 2007.

Life on Life's Terms marked a change in musical style which differentiated from their previous work. Whereas The Dawn was more influenced by emo lyrics and singing/screaming styles, Life on Life's Terms took a more straight-up rock and pop-rock approach. Life on Life's Terms, while not as widely acknowledged as a release as The Dawn, did garner much more positive reviews. Both CDs feature mild guitar solos in various songs despite the somewhat significant changes in musical stylings.

Beginning in October 2007, the band began touring with well-known alternative bands New Found Glory and Senses Fail, and in November Bedlight for Blue Eyes toured with Sullivan and Kenotia.

In April 2008, the band supported Kaddisfly on their headlining tour of the US. On November 1, 2008, the band announced that they were on indefinite hiatus.

On January 23, 2009, at The School of Rock in Hackensack, NJ, the band played their last show.

Daniel Rinaldi has since been filling in for the group Lannen Fall as their lead vocalist and has hinted at a new band coming soon.

== Members ==
Current members

- Daniel Rinaldi - vocals (2006-2009)
- Derek Weber - guitar, vocals (2004-2009)
- Dan Taylor - guitar, vocals (2006-2009)
- Itzhak Bishburg - drums (2004-2009)
- Chris Stiles - drums (2008-2009)

Past members

- Christian Andre Guerrero - vocals (2004-2006)
- James Granuzzo - bass guitar (2004-2006)
- Justin Ortiz - guitar, vocals (2004-2005)
- Joe Oliger - bass guitar, vocals (2005-2007)

== Discography ==
- The Dawn (Trustkill, 2005)
  "Ephemeral Addictions" 3:10
  "Midnight Symphony" 3:57
  "The Nature of the Ghost" 2:37
  "Leaving Berkeley Heights" 3:35
  "Dig on This" 4:53
  "Soundscapes and Lullabies" 2:39
  "Faith" 4:42
  "The Promise" 3:31
  "Reciprocal" 3:49
  "Ligeia" 4:52
- Waste My Time Digital EP (Trustkill, 2006)
  "Waste My Time" 2:51
  "Ephemeral Addictions" 3:13
  "Hindsight" 4:09
  "Livin' on a Prayer" 3:46
- Life on Life's Terms (Trustkill, 2007)
  "The City and the Ghost" 4:00
  "Waste My Time" 2:46
  "Ms. Shapes" 3:10
  "Whole Again" 3:58
  "Walk with Me" 4:16
  "Life on Life's Terms" 3:33
  "Too Late for Us" 3:42
  "Broken Door" 3:36
  "Without You We Are Everything" 2:25
  "Meant to Be" 3:45
  "Michael" 4:33
- 'Punk Goes 90's' (2006)
  "Jumper" 4:05
- 'Taste of Christmas' (2005)
  "Christmas Song" 3:03
- 'Masters of Horror (soundtrack)' (2005)
  "Hindsight" 4:03
- 'Taste of Chaos'(2005)
  "Hindsight" 4:03
