= Punk Goes Acoustic 2 =

Compilation album by "Punk Goes..."
- Released: May 8, 2007
- Recorded: Various
- Genre: Acoustic rock; pop-punk; alternative rock; emo
- Length: 55:00
- Label: Fearless
- Producer: Various

"Punk Goes..." chronology
Punk Goes 90's (2006)	Punk Goes Acoustic 2 (2007)	Punk Goes Crunk (2008)

Professional ratings
Review scores
Source	Rating
Allmusic	3/5 stars

Punk Goes Acoustic 2 is the sixth compilation in the Punk Goes... series and the second installment in the Punk Goes Acoustic series created by Fearless Records. Like the first album it features previously unreleased and acoustic versions of songs from various pop punk bands.

== Track listing ==
#	Title	Artist	Length
1.	"Bruised"	Jack's Mannequin	4:27
2.	"Don't Be So Hard"	The Audition	3:43
3.	"Baby Come On"	+44	2:52
4.	"Sun"	Daphne Loves Derby	3:18
5.	"Woe"	Say Anything	4:07
6.	"Apology"	Alesana	4:00
7.	"Jasey Rae"	All Time Low	3:34
8.	"Red Light Pledge"	Silverstein	3:46
9.	"Night Drive"	The All-American Rejects	3:48
10.	"Three Cheers for Five Years"	Mayday Parade	4:51
11.	"Staplegunned"	The Spill Canvas	3:08
12.	"Who I Am Hates Who I've Been"	Relient K	3:22
13.	"Welcome to 1984"	Anti-Flag	2:28
14.	"The Only Song"	Sherwood	3:12
15.	"Echoes"	Set Your Goals	4:32
