= My Michelle =

Promotional single by Guns N' Roses

from the album Appetite for Destruction
- Released: July 21, 1987
- Genre: Hard rock, punk rock
- Length: 3:39
- Label: Geffen
- Songwriter: Guns N' Roses
- Producer: Mike Clink

"My Michelle" is a song by American rock band Guns N' Roses, featured on the band's 1987 debut studio album Appetite for Destruction.

== Recording ==
For the recording of this song, guitarist Slash used a slightly different setup. For the rest of the album, he used a Gibson Les Paul copy through a modified Marshall amplifier on the same settings for each song. However, for this song, he swapped to a 1960s Gibson SG because he felt it had a darker sound.

== Composition and lyrical intent ==
There are two versions of how the song came to existence.

One version says the song is about a friend of the band, a girl named Michelle Young who is thanked in the Appetite for Destruction cover sleeve. Slash knew Young throughout junior high, as she was a friend of Slash's first girlfriend. According to Axl Rose, he and Young were in a car together when "Your Song" by Elton John came on the radio and Young happened to mention that she had always wanted someone to write a song about her.

Rose's first attempt was a sweet, almost romantic song, but one that had absolutely nothing to do with the reality of Michelle's life. He was unhappy with this version and re-wrote it, this time seeking to be completely honest. Several members of the band expressed concern over this version of the song, especially Slash, fearing it would upset Young. Rose himself then became hesitant, but finally decided to show it to her. She liked the song and the attention it brought to her, and was especially pleased with its honesty, most notably regarding her drug addiction, the death of her mother and her father's work in the pornography industry, all of which are mentioned within the first verse. According to The Autobiography of Slash, Young managed to clean up and move across the country to escape her lifestyle.

The other version has the song being written about an incident going back to before the band became famous, involving a young girl who was breaking the band's equipment during a practice session, and ending with Axl going on the run from the police.

During the 2006 New York and European tours, Axl Rose shared the vocal duties with former Skid Row singer Sebastian Bach.

== Personnel ==
- W. Axl Rose – lead vocals
- Slash – lead guitar
- Izzy Stradlin – rhythm guitar, backing vocals
- Duff "Rose" McKagan – bass guitar, backing vocals
- Steven Adler – drums

== Covers ==
- The song was covered by the punk group AFI for the compilation called Punk Goes Metal.
- In the Super NES, Sega Saturn, and PlayStation versions of the game Mega Man X3, Neon Tiger's stage theme music is extremely similar to this song. Surprisingly, Capcom confirmed this is a coincidence.
- The song was also covered by The Dillinger Escape Plan for the controversial tribute album Bring You to Your Knees: A Tribute to Guns N' Roses. Members of the DEP now admit in interviews that the album was terribly recorded, but they were happy with their song.
