= Punk Goes... =

Compilation album series

Punk Goes... is a series of albums released by Fearless Records in which punk rock bands perform covers of songs from other genres. The series consists of nineteen compilation albums released from 2000 to 2019.

Though predominantly a series of cover albums, Punk Goes Acoustic, Punk Goes Acoustic 2, and Punk Goes Acoustic Vol. 3 deviate from this theme, featuring acoustic versions of original songs by the featured bands. 2013's Punk Goes Christmas and 2015 rerelease of Punk Goes Christmas titled Punk Goes Christmas: Deluxe Edition features a mix of both Christmas-themed original songs and covers. Similarly, the series' first installment, 2000's Punk Goes Metal, consists of covers, with the exception of "Why Rock?" performed by The Aquabats, which was an original song credited to a fictitious band called "Leather Pyrate".

== Albums ==
Year	Title	Chart positions	
Year	Title	U.S.	U.S. Comp
2000	Punk Goes Metal: Released: August 1, 2000	—	—
2002	Punk Goes Pop: Released: April 3, 2002	—	—
2003	Punk Goes Acoustic: Released: October 21, 2003	—	—
2005	Punk Goes 80's: Released: June 7, 2005	—	18
2006	Punk Goes 90's: Released: May 9, 2006	186	10
2007	Punk Goes Acoustic 2: Released: May 8, 2007	125	5
2008	Punk Goes Crunk: Released: May 9, 2008	86	7
2009	Punk Goes Pop 2: Released: March 10, 2009	15	—
2010	Punk Goes Classic Rock: Released: April 27, 2010	23	—
2010	Punk Goes Pop 3: Released: November 2, 2010	26	—
2011	Punk Goes X: Released: January 25, 2011	—	—
2011	Punk Goes Pop 4: Released: November 21, 2011	92	—
2012	Punk Goes Pop 5: Released: November 6, 2012	16	—
2013	Punk Goes Christmas: Released: November 5, 2013	95	—
2014	Punk Goes 90's 2: Released: April 1, 2014	41	—
2014	Punk Goes Pop 6: Released: November 17, 2014	19	—
2015	Punk Goes Christmas: Deluxe Edition: Released: November 27, 2015	—	—
2017	Punk Goes Pop 7: Released: July 14, 2017	79	—
2019	Punk Goes Acoustic Vol. 3: Released: July 26, 2019	—	—

== See also ==
- 'Tis the Season to Be Fearless, a Fearless Records album of Christmas songs by punk artists
