= Dynamite Boy (album) =

Studio album by Dynamite Boy
- Released: May 18, 2004
- Genre: Pop punk
- Label: Fearless

Dynamite Boy chronology
Dynamite Boy vs. Cruiserweight (2003)	Dynamite Boy (2004)

Professional ratings
Review scores
Source	Rating
Allmusic	3.5/5 stars

Dynamite Boy is the fourth studio album by pop punk band Dynamite Boy. Released 2004, it was also their last album before the band's three-year breakup from 2005 to 2008.

== Track listing ==
1. "Suspended Animation"
2. "Satellite"
3. "Man of the Year"
4. "Photograph"
5. "Promise"
6. "Harmonic"
7. "Zap"
8. "Waiting for Erin"
9. "Sky's the Limit"
10. "Bring the Rock"
11. "Accepted"
12. "Long Since Forgotten"
