= Amely =

American rock band

- Origin: Orlando, Florida, U.S.
- Genres: Rock, punk rock, alternative rock, pop
- Years active: 2008–2011
- Label: Fearless Records
- Spinoffs: Sovereign Soldiers
- Past members: Petie Pizarro; Brandon Walden; Patrick Ridgen; Nate Parsell; Jason Seife
- Website: www.myspace.com/amely

Amely was an American rock band from Orlando, Florida, United States, formed in 2008. The band comprised four members; Petie Pizarro (vocals/guitar), Brandon Walden (guitar), Patrick Ridgen (bass) and Nate Parsell (drums). The sound of the band was a mix of rock with power pop elements. Having been a band for a short period of time, Amely managed to be signed to an independent record label, for this genre of music, Fearless Records.

== History ==
Amely did not start out as a fully formed band. It started in 2008 with a studio project for the singer and rhythm guitarist Petie Pizarro (24 years old), who was moving forward as a soloist after the breakup of his previous band. He began writing songs that he would afterwards choose from, for the recording of an EP. Later on, he dubbed "On My Own," at Vision Sound Studios Vision Sound Studios in Jacksonville, Florida with producer Daryl Phennager (Red Jumpsuit Apparatus). Even though Pizarro played most of the instruments on the recording, including guitar, bass, piano and synths, he brought Nate Parsell in to record some complicated drum parts, since they had previously been together in a band. Upon the completion of this EP, in June 2008, Pizarro and Parsell realized they had something worth further exploring musically and agreed to form a band. Bassist, Patrick Ridgen, was soon found and lead guitarist, Brandon Walden, joined them a little later and so Amely was formed. Parsell started as a drummer in the basement of his old house in rural Ohio. He studied percussion privately throughout his high school career, while also playing in marching band, concert band, jazz ensemble, pep band, and pit orchestra for four years, as well as a handful of fruitless "rock bands." He then studied in a music conservatory and earned a degree in recording arts and music business from Full Sail University. Some of his early influences were John Bonham and Charlie Watts along with some more modern influences such as Dave Grohl, Travis Barker, Carter Beauford, and Zac Farro from Paramore.

== Touring, unsigned ==
A blend of rock combined with a dose of power pop influences, Amely started making their mark on the music scene, despite only having been formed after Petie Pizarro's project/EP, for a year. Since playing their first show in March 2009, Amely had completed three national tours, opened for All Time Low, played at the Unsilent Night Festival, with A Day to Remember, Red Jumpsuit Apparatus and Breathe Carolina, and performed on the Kevin Says Stage at the Florida dates of Vans Warped Tour 2009. The band had such a success, that they played in American Samoa in the South Pacific, in front of 5000 people, for Blue Sky's 10 Year Bash. Regarding the geared used in their live shows, the drummer, Parsell, used a four-piece Tama Starclassic Birch kit: 10×12 rack, 16×16 floor, and 18×22 kick—one of the best-sounding kick drums out there, according to him. Also, he's been using Zildjian cymbals, a 24″ K Light ride, a 21″ Brilliant Sweet ride (as a left-side crash), a 20″ A Custom Projection crash, and 14″ A Custom Mastersound hats. In addition to their touring, the band reached nearly a million plays on their MySpace page and was named one of PureVolume's Top 20 Unsigned bands of 2009.

== Recording ==
After touring, and their success, they caught a major recording label's eye. Although they had only been formed as a band for less than a year, in January 2010, Amely was signed by Fearless Records. After being signed, the band headed immediately into the studio with Zack Odem, Kenneth Mount (All Time Low, Mayday Parade), and Mike Green (Paramore, Breathe Carolina) to record their debut EP Hello World, which was released on May 25, 2010. The EP consisted of eight catchy tracks that introduced the band's melodic, pop rock-influenced sound. At this point, lead singer Pizzaro, compared their music to pop-rock bands such as The All American Rejects and Jimmy Eat World and wanted his band to have mass appeal without any age range, gender, or mindset restrictions. "We want to be a mature pop/rock band with a sound that kids can get into, but adults will also enjoy," Pizarro notes. Apart from their EP, the first holiday-themed compilation album series created by Fearless Records called 'Tis the Season to Be Fearless featuring eight Christmas-themed songs was released on November 22, 2010, including Amely's cover of the song "It's Christmas Time Again" originally by Backstreet Boys. The band has also covered the famous song "The Climb" by Miley Cyrus. The song was originally in the soundtrack of the Walt Disney Pictures's movie Hannah Montana and the album was released by Walt Disney Records, but the purpose of the band recording it was to be in the Fearless Records compilation album Punk Goes Pop 3. However, their cover was not on the album and, instead, one their original songs ("Come Back to Me") was included on the bonus CD of Punk Goes Pop 3. Apart from recording, the band went on "Let's Be Animals Tour" with The Downtown Fiction, He Is We and Cady Groves in spring 2011.

== Break-up ==
On November 1, 2011 Amely announced via webchat that they would be breaking up. In addition, before the official break up, the band announced the release of another EP titled Raleigh Sessions, which was self recorded, produced, and mixed. The entire process from start to finish was created by the band alone in Raleigh, North Carolina. The EP was released on November 21, 2011. However, it was released only in a digital form and can be found on iTunes and Spotify. Despite the sad news for the fans, Pizarro, Parsell and Ridgen also announced that they will be forming a new band called Sovereign Soldiers, and Walden would be moving forward as a solo artist. The band's announcement stated:

This decision did not come lightly and was the effect of a great number of things that seemed beyond our control. It has been a more than amazing journey with our best friends and this destination we've now reached is not an end, it is a new beginning. Although we have been extremely discouraged by the discourse that fell upon us, we have not let it knock us down and we hope that you can stay strong with all of us. Since the start of this year and even before that we have been writing for what we intended to be our first full-length album. As the chance to professionally produce our music appeared to grow further in distance we took it upon ourselves to record the songs that we had poured our hearts into. After combining the diverse and plenty skills of all 4 of us, these home recordings are all that's left of Amely. We believe this is some of our greatest work and we want to be able to share it with you. Though it may come as a parting gift, we hope this collection of songs finds you well. It may be the remains of Amely, but we hope it reminds you, this is not the end.

== Band members ==
- Petie Pizarro - Lead Vocalist/Rhythm Guitarist
- Brandon Walden – Lead Guitarist
- Patrick Ridgen - Bassist
- Nate Parsell - Drummer
- Jason Seife Guitarist

== Discography ==
- The Raleigh Sessions (2011)
- Live Under Lights (Live) EP (2011)
- 'Tis The Season To Be Fearless (2010)
- Hello World (2010)
- Amely EP (2009)
