= Jason Seife =

American visual artist

- Born: 1989 (age 36–37); Miami, Florida, U.S.
- Occupations: Visual artist, musician
- Known for: Painting, drawing, sculpture, installation, digital animation, generative art
- Movement: Contemporary art

Jason Seife (born 1989) is an American visual artist and musician from South Florida. He works across painting, drawing, sculpture, installation, site-specific projects, digital animation and generative art. In his paintings and objects, Seife's work explores Middle Eastern heritage and culture through a contemporary lens, and investigates the designs of Persian carpets.

== Background and career ==
Jason Seife was born in 1989 in Miami, Florida, to a Cuban mother and a Syrian father.

To deepen his study and research of traditional textiles, he also travelled to Morocco, Turkey, Iran and Syria to meet carpet weavers and local artists.

=== Artistic process ===
Seife, who has worked as a graphic designer, began painting at the age of seven. His artistic process typically commences with the digital design of elements and the combination of colours that can then be translated into compositions, which he subsequently draws and paints by hand onto canvas, often using acrylic on canvas and occasionally acrylic on concrete. A single painting may take weeks or months to complete.

=== Digital artworks ===
In 2021, Seife developed, alongside Andrew Cassetti, an algorithmic code that transformed eleven hand-drawn artworks into endlessly iterative designs. Seife's algorithmic model is configured to juxtapose and reflect the units within the patterns, thereby creating new versions of his designs.

=== Music industry ===
In his early twenties, Seife performed and toured with bands before returning to the visual arts. "After playing with bands for so long, I realized how much I miss drawing," the artist told Harper's Bazaar magazine in 2020. Prior to pursuing his artistic career, he collaborated with well-established figures in the music industry, including Nicki Minaj, Pharrell Williams and Big Sean.

== Critical reception ==
Following Seife's solo show in London, Mark Westall, founding editor of FAD Magazine, commented on his work:

"This physical-digital-physical process not only allows Seife to create a more powerful visual experience, it also stresses the notion that craftsmanship remains at the centre of the artistic process."

== Solo exhibitions ==
Jason Seife has held solo exhibitions at venues in the United States, the Middle East and Europe.

- 2023 – Coming to Fruition, Pérez Art Museum Miami, Florida
- 2022 – Generascope, ICD Brookfield Place at Dubai International Financial Centre, Dubai
- 2021 – Museo Carlo Bilotti, Rome
- 2021 – A Small Spark vs a Great Forest, Unit London, United Kingdom
- 2018 – Writing on the Walls, Montoro12 Gallery, Brussels
- 2018 – Nucleus, Sharjah Art Museum, United Arab Emirates

== Public collections ==
Seife's work is held in a number of museum and institutional collections, including the Fort Wayne Museum of Art, Indiana; the Mosaic Art Foundation, Istanbul; the Goss-Michael Foundation, Dallas; the Dean Collection, Los Angeles; the Contemporary Art Platform Kuwait; and the Tribal Art Foundation, Raipur, India.
