= Until I Wake =

American post-hardcore band

- Origin: Buffalo, New York, United States
- Genres: Post-hardcore; metalcore; melodic metalcore
- Years active: 2019–present
- Label: Fearless
- Members: August Geitner; Ryan Ridley; Cody Jamison
- Past members: Jaali Cypher; Niko Karras; Alex Curtin

Until I Wake is an American post-hardcore band based out of Buffalo, New York formed in 2019.

== History ==
The band started in 2019 with singer and frontman Cody Jamison, guitarist August Geitner, bassist Ryan Ridley, and drummer Alex Curtain. In 2021, the band signed with Fearless Records in which they released their first self-titled Ep and made their first music video "Nightmares". The following year in 2023, before releasing the first album, they released a single titled "Forsaken" which was set to be on upcoming album. Sometime after, they released their first major album titled "Inside My Head" and released a music video from the album titled "Octane". They then went on tour with fellow US-based bands Attack Attack! and Conquer Divide. In 2022, Until I Wake added a new addition to their band, fellow guitarist Niko Karras, and in June they performed at the Canal Club in Richmond, Virginia alongside Versus Me, If Not For Me, Vilified, and Solarset. In July 2023, they went on tour in the States with Thousand Below as a special guest band. In September 2023, Until I Wake released the music video for their song "Fool's Paradise", and during that time, they were on tour with Attila, Gideon, and Ten56. In November that year, Until I Wake released a deluxe version of "Inside My Head". In 2024, frontman Jamison departed from the band to pursue another project and was replaced later with new singer Jaali Cypher. At the end of 2024 in December, Until I Wake with their new singer released their second album title "Renovate". On January 31, 2025, the band parted ways with Jaali Cypher and announced the return of Cody Jamison.

== Style ==
Until I Wake's music tackles mental health and addiction, with the hope of bringing attention to these issues and encouraging people to speak up. Frontman Cody Jamison discussed the importance of addressing mental health in today's society, as so many people struggle with it as he had first hand experience with the issues.

== Band Members ==
Current

- August Geitner – guitar (2019–present)
- Ryan Ridley – bass (2019–present)
- Cody Jamison – vocals (2019–2023, 2025–present)

Former

- Jaali Cypher – vocals (2023–2025)
- Niko Karras – guitar (2023–2025)
- Alex Curtin – drums (2019–2025)

== Discography ==
Album

- Inside My Head (2022)
- Renovate (2024)

EP

- Until I Wake (2021)
