= Punk Goes Crunk =

Compilation album by "Punk Goes..."
- Released: April 8, 2008
- Recorded: Various
- Genre: Post-hardcore; pop-punk; alternative rock; metalcore; rapcore; rap rock; crunkcore
- Length: 59:13
- Label: Fearless
- Producer: Various

"Punk Goes..." chronology
Punk Goes Acoustic 2 (2007)	Punk Goes Crunk (2008)	Punk Goes Pop Volume Two (2009)

Singles from Punk Goes Crunk
- 1. "Umbrella" Released: April 8, 2008

Professional ratings
Review scores
Source	Rating
AbsolutePunk	(53%)
AllMusic	2/5 stars
Melodic	2.5/5 stars

Punk Goes Crunk is the seventh compilation album in the Punk Goes... series released by Fearless Records. The album is composed of popular hip hop songs performed by various post-hardcore, metalcore and pop punk bands. This is the first and (as of 2017) only Punk Goes... album to carry a Parental Advisory for the sexual, vulgar and sometimes violent nature of the songs. Both All Time Low's cover of "Umbrella" and Forever the Sickest Kids' cover of "Men in Black" were made available for streaming on March 6.

== Track listing ==
#	Title	Artist	Original Artist(s)	Length
1.	"Put Yo Hood Up"	Set Your Goals	Lil Jon & The Eastside Boyz	4:59
2.	"Got Your Money"	Say Anything	Ol' Dirty Bastard featuring Kelis	4:15
3.	"I Wish"	The Secret Handshake	Skee-Lo	2:52
4.	"Men in Black"	Forever the Sickest Kids	Will Smith featuring Coko of SWV	3:05
5.	"California Love"	My American Heart	2Pac featuring Dr. Dre & Roger Troutman	4:16
6.	"I Wanna Love You"	The Maine	Akon featuring Snoop Dogg	3:03
7.	"Kryptonite (I'm on It)"	Emanuel	Purple Ribbon All-Stars	4:30
8.	"The Seed (2.0)"	Person L	The Roots featuring Cody ChesnuTT	4:22
9.	"Still Fly"	The Devil Wears Prada	Big Tymers	4:55
10.	"Umbrella"	All Time Low	Rihanna featuring Jay-Z	3:50
11.	"Notorious Thugs"	Scary Kids Scaring Kids	The Notorious B.I.G. featuring Bone Thugs-n-Harmony	7:23
12.	"Nuthin' but a 'G' Thang"	The Escape Frame	Dr. Dre featuring Snoop Dogg	3:30
13.	"Gin and Juice"	Hot Rod Circuit	Snoop Dogg	3:44
14.	"Hey Ya!"	Lorene Drive	OutKast	4:24
15.	"Tennessee"	New Found Glory	Arrested Development	4:05
