= Punk Goes 80's =

Compilation album by "Punk Goes..."
- Released: June 7, 2005
- Recorded: Various
- Genres: Post-hardcore; pop-punk; alternative rock; emo pop; punk rock
- Length: 57:49
- Label: Fearless
- Producer: Various

"Punk Goes..." chronology
Punk Goes Acoustic (2003)	Punk Goes 80's (2005)	Punk Goes 90's (2006)

Professional ratings
Review scores
Source	Rating
Allmusic	3/5 stars

Punk Goes 80's is the fourth in album in the Punk Goes... series created by Fearless Records. It contains covers of songs that were popular in the 1980s covered by various alternative rock, and pop punk bands. This is also the first album to feature the song "Your Love" by The Outfield being covered by the band Midtown. The song would later appear again on the compilation Punk Goes Classic Rock being covered then by electronicore band I See Stars.

== Track listing ==
#	Title	Artist	Original Artist(s)	Length
1.	"Manic Monday"	Relient K	The Bangles	2:44
2.	"I Ran (So Far Away)"	Hidden In Plain View	A Flock of Seagulls	4:25
3.	"I Melt with You"	Sugarcult	Modern English	3:47
4.	"Your Love"	Midtown	The Outfield	4:23
5.	"Don't You (Forget About Me)"	Rufio	Simple Minds	4:13
6.	"Pop Song 89"	Motion City Soundtrack	R.E.M.	3:05
7.	"Holding Out for a Hero"	Emery	Bonnie Tyler	4:16
8.	"Just Like Heaven"	Gatsbys American Dream	The Cure	3:01
9.	"The Power of Love"	The Early November	Huey Lewis and the News	5:19
10.	"Straight Up"	Halifax	Paula Abdul	4:35
11.	"Dead Man's Party"	A Thorn for Every Heart	Oingo Boingo	3:36
12.	"Wrapped Around Your Finger"	Brazil	The Police	5:09
13.	"Forever Young"	So They Say	Rod Stewart	3:19
14.	"Everybody Wants to Rule the World"	JamisonParker	Tears for Fears	3:33
15.	"Video Killed the Radio Star"	Amber Pacific	Bruce Woolley and the Camera Club/The Buggles	2:30
