= Punk Goes Pop Volume 5 =

Compilation album by "Punk Goes..."
- Released: 1 November 2012
- Recorded: Various
- Genre: Post-hardcore; pop-punk; alternative rock; emo pop; metalcore; electronicore; easycore
- Length: 52:09, (Japanese Edition) 33:29
- Label: Fearless
- Producer: Various

"Punk Goes..." chronology
Punk Goes Pop Volume 4 (2011)	Punk Goes Pop Volume 5 (2012)	Punk Goes Christmas (2013)

Singles from Punk Goes Pop Volume 5
- 1. "Grenade" Released: 2 October 2012; 2. "Somebody That I Used to Know" Released: 16 October 2012; 3. "Ass Back Home" Released: 12 December 2012

Professional ratings
Review scores
Source	Rating
Punknews.org	0.5/5 stars

Punk Goes Pop Volume 5 is the thirteenth compilation album in the Punk Goes... series created by Fearless Records and the fifth installment in the Punk Goes Pop series to contain bands covering mainstream pop music. It was released on November 6, 2012 through Fearless Records. The album debuted at number sixteen on the Billboard 200, selling more than 21,000 copies within its first week. The album spawned three singles to date. The first single off the album was Memphis May Fire's cover of Grenade by Bruno Mars, which was released on October 2, 2012. The album's second single off the album was Mayday Parade's cover of Somebody That I Used to Know by Gotye featuring New Zealand artist Kimbra, which also featured guest vocals by Vic Fuentes of the band Pierce The Veil, it sold more than 15,000 copies within the album's first week of release, debuting at numbers eighteen and nineteen on the Billboard Rock Songs and Heatseekers Songs charts, respectively., it was released on October 16, 2012. The third single off the album was SECRETS cover of Ass Back Home by Gym Class Heroes featuring English artist Neon Hitch, which was released on December 12, 2012.

Additionally Japan's edition contains a second CD featuring Japanese bands covering American pop songs.

== Track listing ==
#	Title	Artist	Original Artist(s)	Length
1.	"Grenade"	Memphis May Fire	Bruno Mars	3:41
2.	"Call Me Maybe"	Upon This Dawning	Carly Rae Jepsen	3:28
3.	"Somebody That I Used to Know"	Mayday Parade featuring Pierce the Veil's Vic Fuentes	Gotye featuring Kimbra	3:25
4.	"Glad You Came"	We Came as Romans	The Wanted	3:03
5.	"Some Nights"	Like Moths to Flames	Fun	4:40
6.	"Billie Jean"	Breathe Carolina	Michael Jackson	4:02
7.	"We Found Love"	Forever the Sickest Kids	Rihanna featuring Calvin Harris	4:21
8.	"Boyfriend"	Issues	Justin Bieber	3:15
9.	"Girls Just Want to Have Fun"	The Maine featuring Taking Back Sunday's Adam Lazzara	Cyndi Lauper	4:50
10.	"Payphone"	Crown the Empire	Maroon 5 featuring Wiz Khalifa	4:17
11.	"Paradise"	Craig Owens	Coldplay	3:55
12.	"Mercy"	The Word Alive	Kanye West featuring Big Sean, Pusha T, and 2 Chainz	5:24
13.	"Ass Back Home"	Secrets	Gym Class Heroes featuring Neon Hitch	3:48

== Sampler Track listing ==
Punk Goes Pop Volume 5 also included a bonus sampler CD featuring 11 previously released songs by bands from the Fearless Records label.

#	Title	Artist	Album	Length
1.	"Devil's Night"	Motionless in White	Infamous	3:55
2.	"Mark My Words"	For All Those Sleeping	Outspoken	3:30
3.	"Go To Hell"	Go Radio	Close the Distance	3:31
4.	"Listening"	Tonight Alive	What Are You So Scared Of?	2:53
5.	"Life Cycles"	The Word Alive	Life Cycles	4:20
6.	"A New Beginning"	Upon This Dawning featuring Chris Motionless of Motionless in White	To Keep Us Safe	3:31
7.	"Hell Above"	Pierce the Veil	Collide with the Sky	3:44
8.	"We Bring an Arsenal"	Lostprophets	Weapons	3:27
9.	"In Friends We Trust"	Chunk! No, Captain Chunk!	Something for Nothing	3:27
10.	"40 Days..."	Blessthefall	Awakening	4:17
11.	"Tempt Me, Temptation"	A Skylit Drive	Identity on Fire	3:31

== Punk Goes Pop Volume 5 (Japanese Edition) ==
Additionally Punk Goes Pop Volume 5 was released in Japan by Triple Vision Entertainment with a bonus CD containing 9 songs by Japanese bands Noisemaker, New Breed, Lost, Ashley Scared The Sky, Her Name In Blood, Secret 7 Line, The Game Shop, Your Last Diary, and Fake Face covering mainstream Pop songs by artists such as Rihanna, Ne-Yo, Daft Punk, and Owl City & Carly Rae Jepsen.

=== Track listing ===
The Japanese Edition included a second CD with the following bonus tracks.

#	Title	Artist	Original Artist(s)	Length
1.	"Rude Boy"	Noisemaker	Rihanna	3:56
2.	"Marry You"	New Breed	Bruno Mars	3:48
3.	"Live While We're Young"	Lost	One Direction	3:34
4.	"Party Rock Anthem"	Ashley Scared The Sky	LMFAO featuring GoonRock and Lauren Bennett	4:19
5.	"This Love"	Her Name In Blood	Maroon 5	3:28
6.	"Baby"	Secret 7 Line	Justin Bieber featuring Ludacris	3:12
7.	"One More Time"	The Game Shop	Daft Punk	4:24
8.	"Good Time"	Your Last Diary	Owl City and Carly Rae Jepsen	3:39
9.	"So Sick"	Fake Face	Ne-Yo	3:03

== Charts and release history ==
Charts

Chart	Peak position
The Billboard 200	16
Top Digital Albums	6
Top Independent Albums	4
Top Modern Rock/Alternative Albums	2
Top Rock Albums	5

Releases

Region	Date	Format
World Wide	November 1, 2012	CD, digital
