= Junction 18 =

American punk rock band

- Origin: Abington, MA, USA
- Genres: Rock, pop punk, alternative rock, punk rock, hard rock
- Years active: 1995–2006
- Past members: Chris Kelley, Andy Bristol, Ryan Spencer, Nick Mele, Scott Morganella, Ryan McHugh, Ricky Cardona, John Menton Jr., Jeff Lavallee, Andrew Abramowitz

Junction 18 was a punk rock band out of Abington, Massachusetts from 1995 – 2006 signed to Fearless Records.

== History ==
Junction 18 toured all the United States and Canada with bands such as New Found Glory, Midtown, Piebald, Big in Japan, Simple Plan, The Receiving End of Sirens, Hot Rod Circuit, The Stryder, Dynamite Boy, Smackin Isiah, Plain White T's, Brazil, BigWig and many more.

After performing as part of the Vans Warped Tour, the band was signed by Fearless Records who released the debut album This Vicious Cycle in 2000. The Heroes from the Future EP followed in 2002, with the split album with Over It, The Acoustic Split, released in 2003. In the same year, they were featured on the tribute album Smoking Popes Tribute. In 2004, it was announced that work had started on a new album, with eventual hopes to have it released sometime in Summer 2005. However, its release was ultimately canceled for unknown reasons.

Past members of the band were Chris Kelley (drums), Andy Bristol (vocals), Ryan Spencer (bass), Nick Mele (bass), Scott Morganella (guitar), Ryan McHugh (guitar), Ricky Cardona (guitar/bass), John Menton Jr (guitar), and Jeff Lavallee (guitar).

The original lineup reunited to play a three-song set at A Loss For Words' final show at the Palladium in Worcester MA on December 27, 2015.

On June 2nd, 2025 it was announced that This Vicious Cycle would be released for the first time on Vinyl by Sand of Time Recording.

On December 12th, 2025, the original band members reunited for a mini-tour, starting with a show at Brighton Music Hall in Boston. Additional shows in New Jersey, Pennsylvania, and New York would follow. On December 20th, 2025 the tour concluded with a show at TV Eye in Queens, NY.

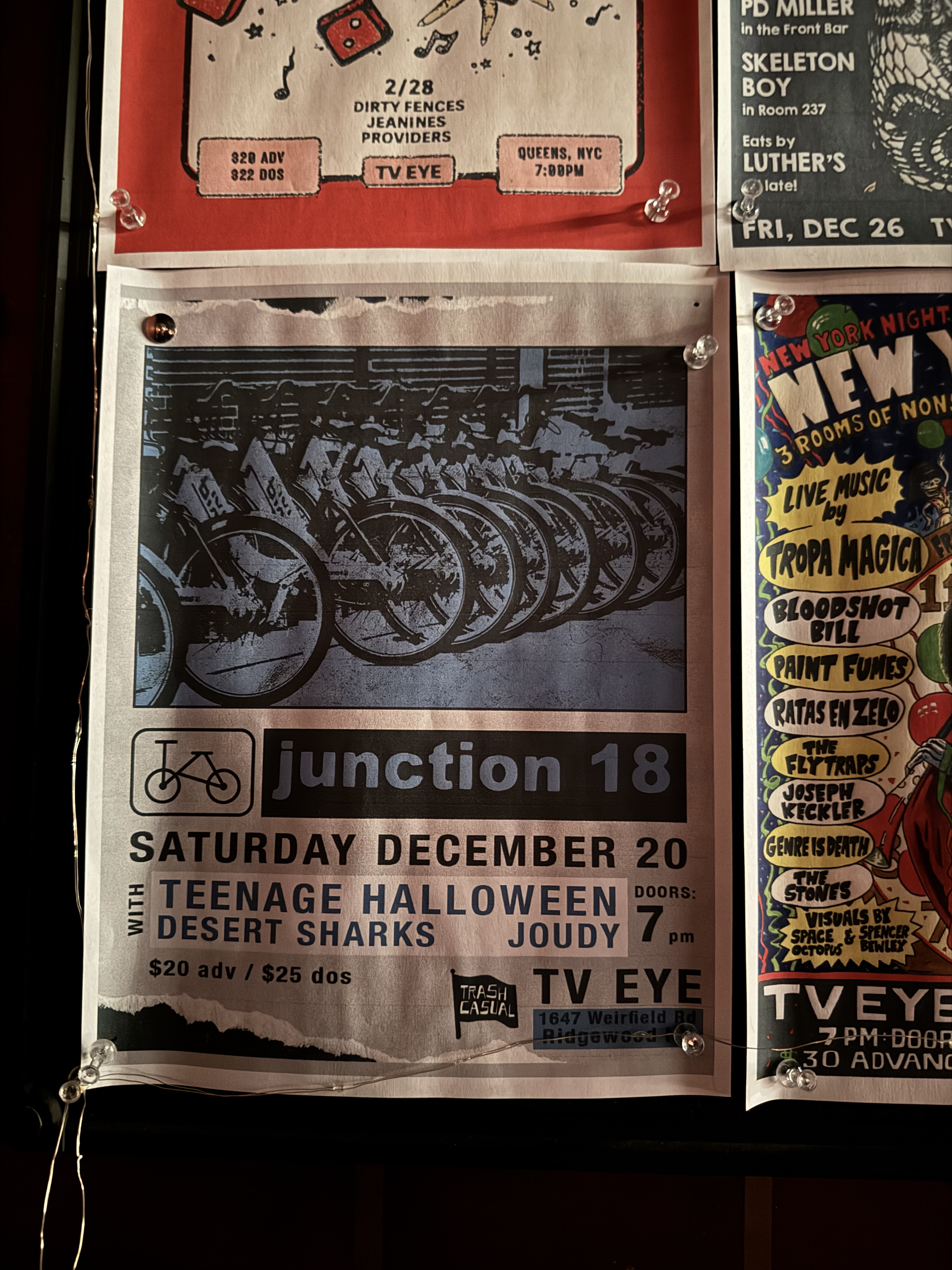
Show poster from the December 20, 2025 Junction 18 show at TV Eye in Queens, NY.

== Discography ==
=== Albums ===
- This Vicious Cycle (2000), Fearless
- The Acoustic Split (2003), Top Notch - with Over It

=== EPs ===
- Heroes from the Future (2002), Fearless

=== Compilations ===
- Don't Be Scared: A Fearless Records Sampler(2001), Fearless
