= My Enemies & I =

US musical group

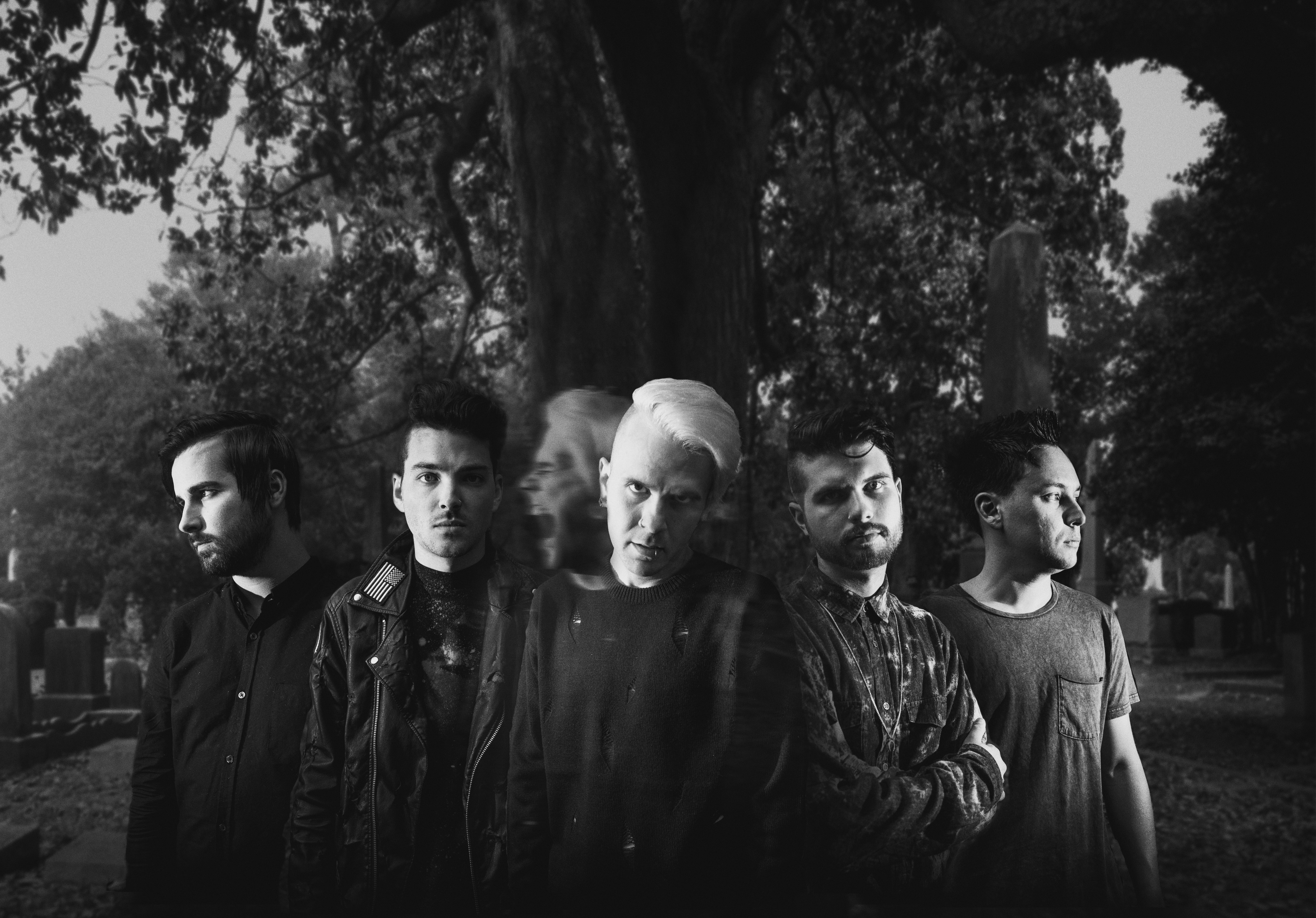
- My Enemies & I in 2017.

Background information
- Origin: Richmond, Virginia, U.S.
- Genres: Metalcore, nu metal
- Years active: 2010-2018, 2020-present
- Labels: Fearless
- Members: Jeff Hill; Zach Jones; Brandon Sellitti; Cameron Perry; Ryan Ganster
- Past members: Joseph Byers; Griffin Kentner; Evon Dixon; Ryan Hounshell

My Enemies & I was an American metalcore band formed in Richmond, Virginia in 2010. Currently signed to Fearless Records, the band's lineup consists of Jeff Hill (vocals), Zach Jones (lead guitar), Brandon Sellitti (rhythm guitar), Ryan Ganster (drums), and Cameron Perry (bass). They have released two EPs, We Will Become Ghosts and Sick World as well as one studio album The Beast Inside.

== History ==
The band signed with Fearless Records in September 2015. Shortly afterwards, they released their Sick World EP.

In November 2016, the band announced they would be entering the studio with Johnny K to record their debut full-length album. On October 13, 2017, the band announced that their debut album, The Beast Inside, will be released on November 3, 2017. Along with this announcement, the band released a music video for their single "Perfect". Upon release of The Beast Inside, the band released a music video for the song of the same name.

On December 31, 2019, the band posted their first social media post since June 2018, teasing new music and a return.

== Musical style ==
The band's style has been described as metalcore, and nu metal.

== Band Members ==
=== Current members ===
- Jeff Hill – lead vocals (2013–present)
- Zach Jones – lead guitar (2010–present), bass (2010–2011)
- Brandon Sellitti – rhythm guitar (2015–present)
- Cameron Perry – bass (2017–present)
- Ryan Ganster – drums (2010–present)

=== Former members ===
- Joseph Byers – lead vocals (2010–2012)
- Griffin Kentner – bass (2015–2017)
- Ryan Hounshell – rhythm guitar (2010–2012, 2013–2015), bass (2010–2011)
- Evon Dixon –bass (2011–2015)

== Discography ==
Studio Albums

- The Beast Inside (2017)

Extended Plays

- We Will Become Ghosts (2012)
- Sick World (2015)

Singles

- "All Roads Lead to Roam" (2011)
- "Mary O'Nett" (2013)
- "Parasite" (2013)
- "Carbon Copy" (2015)
- "Wolves Teeth" (2015)
- "Toxic" (2016)
- "Reborn" (2016)
- "Riot" (2017)
- "Perfect" (2017)
- "The Beast Inside" (2017)

== Music videos ==
- "Wolves Teeth" (2015)
- "Toxic" (2016)
- "Reborn" (2016)
- "Fiends" (2016)
- "Perfect" (2017)
- "The Beast Inside" (2017)
