= Keepsake (band) =

American band

- Origin: Coral Springs, Florida, U.S.
- Genres: Emo, screamo
- Years active: 1997–2003
- Labels: Eulogy Recordings; Fearless Records
- Past members: Paul Geller; Shane Halpern; Colby Hooper; Jesse Kriz; Dan Mazin; Trevor Short; Rob Yapkowitz; Justin Manlove

Keepsake was an American emo/screamo band formed in 1997 by Paul Geller, Mark Silva and Duane Hosein in Coral Springs, Florida. Hosein joined the band An Acre Lost (which changed name to Poison the Well in 1998) and ultimately had to quit Keepsake. He was replaced by Shane Halpern, former vocalist of An Acre Lost. After releasing three albums and EP on the independent label, Eulogy Recordings and Fearless Records, Geller left the band for personal reasons. He also produced three records for RED Music-distributed Undecided Records artists Shindig, Hearts Over Rome and Cru Jones. Geller moved into digital music and worked as EVP of Information Products at Grooveshark.

Jesse Kriz was later a part of Actions Speak Louder and Until the End. They also appeared on Punk Goes Pop with the song "The Way You Love Me".

They cited influences including Boysetsfire, the Get Up Kids and Sepultura. In advertisements, their label Eulogy Recordings described their sound as "Cross[ing] Grade with New Day Rising".

== Members ==
Final lineup

- Shane Halpern – lead vocals (1998–2003), guitar, synths (2001–2003)
- Robert Yapkowitz – guitar (2000–2003), bass (2003)
- Jesse Kriz – drums, background vocals (2000–2003)
- Derek Carty – bass (2003)

Former members and touring musicians

- Duane Hosein – lead vocals (1997–1998)
- Dan Mazin – bass (1997–1998)
- Trevor Short – bass (1998–1999)
- Tommy Trimble – bass (2000–2001)
- Justin Manlove – bass (2001–2002)
- Brian Pugh – bass (2002–2003)
- Jesse Steele – bass (2003)
- Paul Geller – lead guitar, bass, backing vocals (1997–2001)
- Mark Silva – rhythm guitar (1997–2000)
- Mykee Shaffer – guitar (2003)
- Colby Hooper – drums (1998–2000)
- Chris Hornbrook – drums (2000)
- Adam Gobble
- Richard O'Neil

== Discography ==
- The Things I Would Say (1998, Eulogy Recordings)
- She Hums Like a Radio (EP, 2000, Red Dawn Records; re-issued by Eulogy Recordings)
- The End of Sound (2001, Eulogy Recordings)
- Black Dress in a B Movie (2003, Fearless Records)

== Related bands ==
- Until the End - Dan Mazin, Jesse Kriz
- The Cartoon Life - Shane Halpern
- Harbour Lights - Shane Halpern
- A Jealousy Issue -Duane Hosein
- Poison The Well - Shane Halpern
