= Eat Your Heart Out (band) =

Australian rock band

- Origin: Newcastle, New South Wales, Australia
- Genres: Pop punk; grunge
- Years active: 2012–present
- Labels: Fearless
- Members: Caitlin Henry; Will Moore; Jake Cronin
- Past members: Andrew Anderson; Dom Cant
- Website: Eat Your Heart Out on fearlessrecords.com

Eat Your Heart Out are an Australian rock band formed in Newcastle in 2012. After playing on the Snake Or Die Tour in 2016, they signed to label Fearless Records in 2017 and headlined their own Carried Away Tour. In 2018, they toured with Movements, whose member Patrick Miranda has also collaborated with the band on the tracks "Conscience" and "Carousel".

== Members ==
Current

- Caitlin Henry – lead vocals (2012–present)
- Will Moore – guitar/vocals (2012–present)
- Jake Cronin – drums (2012–present)

Additional

- Isaac Moses-Considine – bass/vocals (2022–present)
- Tim Driver – guitar (2022–present)

Former

- Andrew Anderson – guitar (2012–2022)
- Dom Cant – bass (2012–2022)

== Discography ==
=== Albums ===
- Florescence (2019), under Fearless Records
- Can't Stay Forever (2022) under Fearless Records

=== EPs ===
- Distance Between Us (2015)
- Carried Away (2017), under Fearless Records
- Mind Games (2017), under Fearless Records

=== Singles ===
- "Carousel" (2019), on Florescence
- "Spinning" (2019), on Florescence
- "Closer to the Sun" (2019), on Florescence
