= Dynamite Boy =

American pop punk band

- Dynamite Boy

Background information
- Origin: Austin, Texas
- Genres: Pop punk
- Years active: 1995 – 2005 (Partial reunions: 2006, 2007, 2008, 2010, 2012, 2014
- Labels: Offtime Records (1997–1998); Fearless Records (1999–2004)
- Members: Sean Neil; Dusty Kohn; Adrian Munoz; Sam Rich
- Past members: Andrew Leeper; Scott Williams; Daniel Cavazos; Matt Greco; John Huckleba; Lester Chiu; Craig Tweedy; Urny Maxwell
- Website: myspace.com/dynamiteboy/

Dynamite Boy was a pop punk band from Austin, Texas. Their final and longest lasting line-up included Sean Neil, Dusty Kohn, Adrian Munoz and Sam Rich. They disbanded in 2005 after a ten-year career, with several reunions between then and 2014, where they celebrated the 10th anniversary of the release of their final record. They have been inactive since.

== History ==
Dynamite Boy were formed in 1995 in Austin by Andrew Leeper, Matt Greco, Lester Chiu, and John Huckleba after shifting to a more pop punk style from their previous punk and funk incarnation known as Yoda's Love Child. Original singer Lester Chiu left a few months in and was replaced by Sean Neil, then of the Contradicks. Sean originally joined just as a singer but started playing guitar after facing crippling stage fright during his first show with the band. They recorded a demo tape in 1996, along with a split 7-inch with The Impossibles made to coincide with an ill-fated tour to the West Coast in the summer of 1996. Not long after the tour, drummer John Huckleba left and was replaced by Scott Williams, formerly of 4th Grade Nothing and Spill. This line-up recorded their first full-length album, Hell is Other People in December 1996 and January 1997. Before that record was released through Offtime Records late in 1997, bassist Matt Greco left. He was briefly replaced by Craig Tweedy of the Impossibles, before the band found a permanent replacement with Adrian Munoz in 1998.

The band played shows primarily in Texas for their first few years, before signing to Fearless Records in 1999, recording and releasing their second full-length album, Finder's Keepers and a contractually obligated EP for Offtime Records called Devoted, which went unreleased until 2001. The final original member, Andrew Leeper, announced his intention to leave during the recording of Finder's Keepers as he did not want to tour. He was replaced by Daniel Cavazos, who played with the band through the recording of their third album Somewhere in America, released in 2001. That year drummer Scott Williams left and was replaced by Sam Rich. Guitarist Daniel Cavazos was ultimately replaced by Dusty Kohn, while Urny Maxwell of Cruiserweight filled in when possible in between. Maxwell appears playing guitar with the band in the Satellite music video.

During their existence, Dynamite Boy toured with bands such as The Ataris, The Offspring, The Mighty Mighty Bosstones, Further Seems Forever, Riddlin' Kids, Cruiserweight, Fall Out Boy, Mest, and Lost City Angels.

After releasing their last album in 2004, Dynamite Boy disbanded in 2005, after Sean Neil expressed his desire to quit touring and start a family.

Also in 2004, the band wrote and recorded the title track (same name as the film) for the short film Gay By Dawn, under the moniker of the band name 'Loincloth'.

On April 21, 2008, Punkbands.com reported that Dynamite Boy had reformed and would be playing at the Emo's in Austin on April 26, although this was not the band's first reunion show; they had previously got together for one-off shows in both 2006 and 2007 in Austin. The 2008 show was in celebration of a release of a digital only rarities collection called Time Flies. Dynamite Boy played further reunion shows in 2008, 2010, 2012, and 2014.

In 2002 Dynamite Boy did a cover of "I Want It That Way" made famous by the Backstreet Boys for the album Punk Goes Pop created by Fearless Records, they also did a cover for another album for the Punk Goes... series: "T.N.T" by AC/DC for the Punk Goes Metal album. Also in 2003 the band lent its music to be used to in the Disney film "MXP: Most Extreme Primate." The songs "AV99", "Kaleidoscope", and "Little Bobby" are featured in the film with "AV99" mimed by Trevor Wright's character Jay's band as a celebration for his little brother and a chimp winning a snowboard race.

== Discography ==
=== Albums ===
- Hell Is Other People (Offtime Records; 1997)
- Finder's Keeper's (Fearless Records; 1999)
- Somewhere in America (Fearless Records; 2001)
- Dynamite Boy (Fearless Records; 2004)

=== EPs ===
- Devoted EP (Offtime Records, 2001)
- Dynamite Boy vs. Cruiserweight split EP with Cruiserweight (Stab Me Recordings, 2003)

=== Compilations ===
- Time Flies (Stab Me Recordings; 2008)
- Punk til ya Promote (Bad Stain Records; 2000)

=== Singles ===
- "Only God Can Stop Us Now" split 7-inch with The Impossibles (Rollo Records, 1996)
- "Red Envelope" 7-inch (Stab Me Recordings, 2003)
