= The Morning Light =

- Origin: Pittsburgh, Pennsylvania, United States
- Genres: Pop rock
- Years active: 2006 – October 2009
- Label: Fearless Records
- Spinoff of: Transition
- Members: Bobby Garver; Harrison Wargo; Matt Colussy; Nick Baxter; Andrew McDonald
- Past members: Jason Mitsch

The Morning Light was an American pop rock band based in Pittsburgh, Pennsylvania, United States. The group was signed to Fearless Records.

== History ==
The Morning Light formed in 2006 after the breakup of local group Transition. Transition's bassist, Harrison Wargo, formed a band with singer Bobby Garver, soon after adding Transition's former guitarist, Matt Colussy. Nick Baxter also joined on drums and Andrew McDonald on bass. The group toured throughout most of 2007 with Wargo and Garver as dual lead vocalists. In December 2007, the band signed to Fearless Records. In February 2008, the band began recording their debut album with producer Matt Goldman. They released their debut EP, The Sounds of Love in March 2008. Following its release the group toured with All Time Low and appeared at Bamboozle Left. In June and August 2008, the band performed on the Warped Tour. Their self-titled full-length album was released September 23, 2008 and hit #27 on the Billboard Heatseekers chart. The album featured upbeat tunes with prominent piano and vocal harmonies, and garnered comparisons to Panic! at the Disco and Steel Train. In September and October 2008, the band went on a cross-country US tour with the Rocket Summer. Wargo left the group in January 2009. Harrison Wargo now is making music solo and just released his first album titled "Speckled". Even though the band promised a new release, they broke up in October 2009. Andy has returned to school at Penn State and Matt went on to work with Maryland-based pop punk band All Time Low, with everybody else possibly moving on to other projects. The band released a final song, "Colors", which would have appeared on the new release, on their Myspace.

== Members ==
- Bobby Garver - Vocals
- Matt Colussy - Guitar
- Nick Baxter - Drums
- Andrew McDonald - Bass
- Harrison Wargo - Keyboards, vocals, songwriter
- Jason Mitsch - Bass guitar, bass

== Discography ==
- The Sounds of Love EP (Fearless Records, March 2008)
- The Morning Light (Fearless Records, September 2008)
