= Classic Case =

American rock band

- Origin: Chapel Hill, North Carolina, U.S.
- Genres: Alternative rock
- Years active: 2002–2007
- Labels: Fearless, Help, Fiddler
- Members: Jared Draughon; Josh Moore; Durijah Lang; Eric Mendelson
- Past members: Stephan Linde; Mitchell Marlow

Classic Case was an American rock band from Chapel Hill, North Carolina, formed in 2002.

== History ==
Vocalist/guitarist Jared Draughon and guitarist Mitchell Marlow formed the band in the early months of 2002 in their hometown of Chapel Hill, North Carolina. They had played in a punk band together before but had been separated for two years, with Marlow living and studying in Brooklyn, NY. Marlow persuaded Draughon to relocate the band to Brooklyn where they would begin rehearsing with Marlow's former Sound of Speed drummer, Stephan Linde. Shortly afterward, they recruited bassist Eric Mendelson, a cohort from New Jersey, who rounded out the initial lineup of the band.

The four recorded and released an EP dubbed It's Been Business Doing Pleasure With You. The band then played with Puddle of Mudd and Orgy to Taking Back Sunday and The Used.

In 2004, original drummer Stephan Linde, was replaced by his longtime friend and fellow Long Islander, Durijah Lang (Saves the Day, Glassjaw, The Stryder). After several months of touring and writing, the band delved into a Manhattan recording studio for 3 months to record their debut full-length, Dress to Depress.

Classic Case spent 2005 with the addition of former Beloved vocalist/guitarist Josh Moore being brought into the fold, and the band packing up and returning to its birthplace in North Carolina. Dress to Depress was released October 18, 2005, on Help/Fiddler Records. Fiddler Records dissolved shortly after the record was released.

Their follow-up record, Losing at Life, was produced by the lead singer and guitarist of the band Helmet, Page Hamilton. The album was released on Fearless Records on February 20, 2007.

As of mid-January, Mitchell Marlow was no longer listed as a guitarist on the band's Myspace page. Classic Case has since announced publicly that though Mitchell is no longer in Classic Case, it is an amicable split and they are still good friends. He later joined fellow North Carolina band He Is Legend and also played guitar for Filter. In addition, Durijah Lang is currently playing with Glassjaw and Saves the Day.

Jared Draughon is currently performing in Must Be the Holy Ghost. Must Be the Holy Ghost signed with Cardigan Records in January 2014. Must Be the Holy Ghost released his debut album, Get Off, on April 1, 2014. Must Be The Holy Ghost was direct support for The XX for their album release show at Lincoln Theater in Raleigh, North Carolina.

== Discography ==
=== Albums ===
- Dress to Depress (Fiddler Records, October 18, 2005)
- Losing at Life (Fearless Records, February 20, 2007)

=== EPs/singles ===
- It's Been Business Doing Pleasure with You (EP, 2003)
- Black Unicorn Split (split with He Is Legend) (2006)
