= Punk Goes 90's =

Compilation album by "Punk Goes..."
- Released: May 9, 2006
- Recorded: Various
- Genre: Post-hardcore; pop-punk; alternative rock; metalcore; pop rock; punk rock
- Length: 55:34
- Label: Fearless

"Punk Goes..." chronology
Punk Goes 80's (2005)	Punk Goes 90's (2006)	Punk Goes Acoustic 2 (2007)

Professional ratings
Review scores
Source	Rating
AbsolutePunk	(26%)
Allmusic	2.5/5 stars

Punk Goes 90's is the fifth album in the Punk Goes... series and the first installment in the Punk Goes 90's series created by Fearless Records. It contains popular songs from the 1990s covered by various alternative rock bands. The cover art references the iconic cover of Nirvana's Nevermind, on which "In Bloom" originally appeared. As of 2017 there have been a total of two albums in the franchise.

== Track listing ==
#	Title	Artist	Original Artist(s)	Length
1.	"March of the Pigs"	Mae	Nine Inch Nails	2:45
2.	"Song 2"	Plain White T's	Blur	2:07
3.	"Under the Bridge"	Gym Class Heroes	Red Hot Chili Peppers	3:25
4.	"Black Hole Sun"	Copeland	Soundgarden	4:31
5.	"Hey Jealousy"	Hit the Lights	Gin Blossoms	2:58
6.	"All I Want"	Emery	Toad the Wet Sprocket	3:49
7.	"Losing My Religion"	Scary Kids Scaring Kids	R.E.M.	3:57
8.	"Wonderwall"	Cartel	Oasis	4:53
9.	"You Oughta Know"	The Killing Moon	Alanis Morissette	3:41
10.	"Stars"	Bleeding Through	Hum	5:21
11.	"Enjoy the Silence"	Anberlin	Depeche Mode	3:32
12.	"The Beautiful People"	Eighteen Visions	Marilyn Manson	3:35
13.	"Big Time Sensuality"	The Starting Line	Björk	3:12
14.	"In Bloom"	So They Say	Nirvana	3:48
15.	"Jumper"	BEDlight for BlueEYES featuring Sebastian Davin of Dropping Daylight	Third Eye Blind	4:04
