= Punk Goes Metal =

Compilation album by "Punk Goes..."
- Released: August 1, 2000
- Recorded: Various
- Genres: Melodic hardcore; punk rock; pop-punk; skate punk; hardcore punk; heavy metal; crossover thrash
- Length: 64:57
- Label: Fearless
- Producer: Various

"Punk Goes..." chronology
| Punk Goes Metal (2000) | Punk Goes Pop (2002) |

Professional ratings
Review scores
| Source | Rating |
|---|---|
| AllMusic | 4/5 stars |
| Ox-Fanzine | Unfavorable |

Punk Goes Metal is the first compilation album to be released as part of the Punk Goes... series created by Fearless Records. It features covers of hard rock and heavy metal songs by punk rock bands and was released on August 1, 2000.

The Aquabats!' contribution, "Why Rock?", is actually an original composition, credited to fictional band "Leather Pyrate".

== Track listing ==
| # | Title | Artist | Original Artist(s) | Length |
|---|---|---|---|---|
| 1. | "Breakin' the Law" | Divit | Judas Priest | 2:09 |
| 2. | "Talk Dirty to Me" | Jughead's Revenge | Poison | 3:26 |
| 3. | "My Michelle" | AFI | Guns N' Roses | 3:33 |
| 4. | "War Ensemble" | Bigwig | Slayer | 5:10 |
| 5. | "Heaven" | New Found Glory | Warrant | 3:30 |
| 6. | "Bark at the Moon" | Strung Out | Ozzy Osbourne | 3:32 |
| 7. | "I Remember You" | The Ataris | Skid Row | 3:38 |
| 8. | "Harvester of Sorrow" | Link 80 | Metallica | 4:31 |
| 9. | "Sexual Abuse" | Guttermouth | St. Madness | 3:56 |
| 10. | "T.N.T." | Dynamite Boy | AC/DC | 3:19 |
| 11. | "Little Fighter" | Death By Stereo | White Lion | 4:09 |
| 12. | "Youth Gone Wild" | Mad Caddies | Skid Row | 3:02 |
| 13. | "I Don't Know" | Turnedown | Ozzy Osbourne | 4:38 |
| 14. | "Looks That Kill" | Diesel Boy | Mötley Crüe | 3:46 |
| 15. | "Holy Wars...The Punishment Due" | Rx Bandits | Megadeth | 5:10 |
| 16. | "Love Song" | Ten Foot Pole | Tesla | 2:36 |
| 17. | "Why Rock?" | The Aquabats! | Leather Pyrate (The Aquabats!) | 4:52 |
