= Punk Goes Classic Rock =

Compilation album by "Punk Goes..."
- Released: (United States) April 27, 2010
- Recorded: Various
- Genre: Post-hardcore; pop-punk; alternative rock; hard rock; power pop; alternative metal; easycore
- Length: 58:35
- Label: Fearless
- Producer: Various

"Punk Goes..." chronology
| Punk Goes Pop Volume Two (2009) | Punk Goes Classic Rock (2010) | Punk Goes Pop Volume 03. (2010) |

Professional ratings
Review scores
| Source | Rating |
|---|---|
| Bloody-disgusting | 2/5 stars |
| Kikaxemusic | 3.5/5 stars |
| Sputnikmusic | 2/5 stars |
| The Tune | (2.9/5) |

Punk Goes Classic Rock is the ninth album in the Punk Goes... series, released by Fearless Records on April 27, 2010. The album contains another cover of the Outfield's "Your Love", this time by I See Stars, which was first covered by Midtown on Punk Goes 80's in 2005. Also included with the album is an additional Bonus CD Sampler with each physical copy.

The Japan edition of the album contains two extra bonus tracks of covers by Japanese bands.

== Track listing ==
On February 23, 2010, the official track listing was released on the Punk Goes Classic Rock Myspace.

| # | Title | Artist | Original Artist(s) | Length |
|---|---|---|---|---|
| 1. | "More than a Feeling" | Hit the Lights | Boston | 2:44 |
| 2. | "Paint It Black" | VersaEmerge | The Rolling Stones | 3:39 |
| 3. | "Free Fallin'" | The Almost | Tom Petty & The Heartbreakers | 4:31 |
| 4. | "We Are the Champions" | Mayday Parade | Queen | 3:14 |
| 5. | "Rock and Roll All Nite" | The Summer Set | Kiss | 4:02 |
| 6. | "Caught Up in You" | We the Kings | .38 Special | 4:05 |
| 7. | "Separate Ways (Worlds Apart)" | A Skylit Drive | Journey | 4:09 |
| 8. | "Your Love" | I See Stars | The Outfield | 3:13 |
| 9. | "(Don't Fear) The Reaper" | Pierce the Veil | Blue Öyster Cult | 4:20 |
| 10. | "Crazy Train" | Forever the Sickest Kids | Ozzy Osbourne | 4:57 |
| 11. | "Pour Some Sugar on Me" | The Maine | Def Leppard | 3:58 |
| 12. | "All Along the Watchtower" | Envy on the Coast | Bob Dylan (as covered by Jimi Hendrix) | 3:52 |
| 13. | "Take Me Home Tonight" | Every Avenue featuring Juliet Simms formerly of Automatic Loveletter | Eddie Money featuring Ronnie Spector of The Ronettes | 3:35 |
| 14. | "Bohemian Rhapsody" | Never Shout Never | Queen | 6:06 |
| 15. | "Dream On" | Blessthefall | Aerosmith | 4:50 |

=== Japanese Edition ===
The Japanese version contains the following two bonus tracks.

| # | Title | Artist | Original Artist(s) | Length |
|---|---|---|---|---|
| 16. | "Runaway" | LOST | Bon Jovi | 3:29 |
| 17. | "Walk This Way" | New Strike Zipper | Aerosmith | 3:05 |
