= Rock Kills Kid =

- Origin: Los Angeles, California, U.S.
- Genres: Art punk, alternative rock
- Years active: 2001–2010
- Labels: Fearless, Reprise
- Members: Jeff Tucker; Shawn Dailey; Mike Balboa; Sean Stopnik; Reed Calhoun
- Past members: Sam Kearney; Ian Hendrickson; Devin Kelly; Kirk Huffman; Chris Poulson; Danny Extravaganza

Rock Kills Kid was an American art punk/alternative rock band from Los Angeles, California that consisted of Jeff Tucker (guitar and vocals), Shawn Dailey (bass), Sean Stopnik (guitar), Reed Calhoun (keyboards/vocals), and Mike Balboa (drums). Their music often drew comparisons to new wave/post-punk bands such as the Cure, Echo & the Bunnymen, Duran Duran, Modern English and U2, as well as new bands such as the Killers and Franz Ferdinand. They were named one of Rolling Stone magazine's "10 Artists to Watch in 2006". The group disbanded in 2010, ending their short-lived career.

== History ==
Although there was a period when Jeff Tucker, Kirk Huffman, and Danny "Extravaganza" played under the moniker "The Jeff Tucker Extravaganza", the initial incarnation of "Rock Kills Kid" consisted of Jeff Tucker (vocals, guitar, song-writing), Kirk Huffman (bass), Devin Kelly (guitar, b/g vocals, piano), and Chris Poulson (drums, b/g vocals). This version of Rock Kills Kid toured moderately across the United States in support of the debut self-titled 5-song EP released in early 2003 by Fearless Records.

During the end of the self-titled EP tour, the band also recorded two songs with producer/engineer Ariel Rechtshaid (formerly of "The Hippos"). The songs were titled "Still Standing" and "Farewell." The former track "Still Standing" appeared on a Fearless Records Promotional CD: 2003 And Beyond... and was remade later on the album Are You Nervous? and retitled the track, "Hope Song". The latter was included with a bonus disc inside select copies of the Fearless Records Punk Goes Acoustic compilation.

Following this period, with no money and no place to live, Tucker began sleeping at the recording studio Fearless was paying for in Los Angeles while writing songs for the first-coming full-length album. During this time, the group had a slight line-up change, and they regrouped with a newer line-up consisting of drummer Poulson, bassist Dailey, and guitarist Stopnik. The band shortly added keyboardist/guitar/bg-vox Reed Calhoun, to the line-up, while Poulson parted ways with the band in mid/late 2005. After the full-length album wrapped in the studio, the band added on drummer Sam Kearney for a fall 2005 tour with the band, Electric Six. Near the end of the tour the band parted with Kearney, and brought drummer Ian Hendrickson on board, and toured in 2006 with She Wants Revenge, which further boosted their profile, as did the use of "Hideaway" on an episode of Fox television drama The O.C..

They signed to Reprise Records and toured extensively in support of their debut album, Are You Nervous (with drums played by Kenny Livingston of Sugarcult and production/engineering tasks given to Mark Trombino) who recorded drums at Hollywood Recording and the rest at Doug Messenger's hard drive analog and digital in North Hollywood.

"Hideaway" was an iTunes free download in April 2006. "Paralyzed" is the first single off "Are You Nervous" and was sent to radio that same month. "Paralyzed" was played during the credits of the 2008 feature film Prom Night.

In the summer of 2006 the band entered the recording studio again and recorded an acoustic EP with producer Marc Jordan. The band also began recording songs for a sophomore record with Marc Jordan and additional tracks with Michael Beinhorn.

== Discography ==
=== Albums ===
- Rock Kills Kid EP (2003), Fearless
- Are You Nervous? (2006), Fearless/Reprise - US Heatseekers #10

=== Singles ===
Year	Single	Peak chart positions		Album
Year	Single	US Adult	US Alt	Album
2006	"Paralyzed"	35	12	Are You Nervous?
2006	"Hideaway"	—	—	Are You Nervous?
"—" denotes that a recording did not chart.
