= Punk Goes Christmas =

Compilation album by "Punk Goes..."
- Released: 5 November 2013
- Recorded: Various
- Genre: Christmas music; pop-punk; alternative rock; electropop; pop rock; metalcore
- Length: 41:27 (original release); 54:17 (Deluxe Edition)
- Label: Fearless
- Producer: Various

"Punk Goes..." chronology
Punk Goes Pop Volume 5 (2012)	Punk Goes Christmas (2013)	Punk Goes 90s Vol. 2 (2014)

Punk Goes Christmas is the fourteenth compilation album of the Punk Goes... series. It was released on 5 November 2013, through Fearless Records.

== Background and release ==
This album, compared to the other albums in the Punk Goes... series received little press. The album was announced in a trailer posted online by Fearless Records in October 2013, along with the album's artwork and full track listing. A thirty second network television commercial was produced and directed by Bobby Czzowitz to promote the album’s release. The album was released and available to stream online on November 4 the same year. It is also one of the only Punk Goes... albums to contain original songs, however it does still contain cover songs.

== Critical reception ==
Professional ratings
Review scores
Source	Rating
AllMusic	3/5 stars
Alter the Press	4/5

Mark Deming from AllMusic praised the album's range of sounds, ranging from pop punk to metalcore. Edward Strickson of Alter the Press! gave the album a 4/5 score, praising its surprisingly festive characteristics and went on to say that "Fool's Holiday" by All Time Low may be one of the best songs they have made.

== Deluxe edition ==
In November 2015, Fearless Records released a deluxe edition of Punk Goes Christmas with four additional tracks added to the original Punk Goes Christmas album. The songs on the album that were added were three additional covers and one new original song titled "12 Days of a Pop-Punk Christmas" performed by YouTube comedian Jarrod Alonge, credited to his fictitious YouTube band Sunrise Skater Kids. The first song from the deluxe edition is August Burns Red's cover of the Home Alone Theme, originally composed by John Williams.

== Track listing ==
#	Title	Artist	Original artist(s)	Length
1.	"Nothing for Christmas"	New Found Glory		3:36
2.	"Fool's Holiday"	All Time Low		3:43
3.	"I Had a Heart"	Real Friends		2:39
4.	"Father Christmas"	Man Overboard	The Kinks	3:29
5.	"This Christmas"	The Summer Set	Donny Hathaway	3:03
6.	"There Will Be No Christmas"	Crown the Empire		3:08
7.	"Christmas Lights"	Yellowcard	Coldplay	4:02
8.	"Merry Christmas, Happy Holidays"	Issues	NSYNC	3:48
9.	"All I Can Give You"	Jason Lancaster		4:02
10.	"I Don't Wanna Spend Another Christmas Without You"	The Ready Set		3:19
11.	"This Christmas (I'll Burn It To The Ground)"	Set It Off		3:27
12.	"Do You Hear What I Hear?"	William Beckett	The Harry Simeone Chorale	3:11

Deluxe Edition

#	Title	Artist	Original artist(s)	Length
4.	"12 Days of Pop-Punk Christmas"	Sunrise Skater Kids		3:27
9.	"Home Alone Theme"	August Burns Red	John Williams	3:50
12.	"Have Yourself A Merry Little Christmas"	Being as an Ocean	Judy Garland	2:37
14.	"Sleigh Ride"	This Wild Life	Arthur Fiedler and the Boston Pops Orchestra	2:56

== Sampler track listing ==
Punk Goes Christmas also included a sampler CD containing eight previously released songs by bands from the Fearless Record label.

#	Title	Artist	Album	Length
1.	"Déjà Vu"	Blessthefall	Hollow Bodies	4:17
2.	"Lightning in a Bottle"	The Summer Set	Legendary	4:07
3.	"Haters Gonna Hate"	Chunk! No, Captain Chunk!	Pardon My French	3:21
4.	"Told Ya So"	Get Scared	Everyone's Out To Get Me	3:31
5.	"I Won't Lie"	Go Radio	Close the Distance	3:38
6.	"Nikki"	Forever the Sickest Kids	J.A.C.K.	3:43
7.	"Mark My Words"	For All Those Sleeping	Outspoken	3:30
8.	"12 Through 15"	Mayday Parade	Monsters in the Closet	4:58

== Charts and release history ==
Charts

Chart	Peak position
US Billboard 200	95
US Alternative Albums	16
US Rock Albums	22
US Independent Albums	15
US Top Holiday Albums	9

Release history

Region	Date	Format
World Wide	November 4, 2013	CD, digital
