= Punk Goes Pop =

Compilation album by "Punk Goes..."
- Released: April 2, 2002
- Recorded: Various
- Genres: Pop-punk; melodic hardcore; punk rock; skate punk; emo pop; hardcore punk
- Length: 56:49
- Label: Fearless
- Producer: Various

"Punk Goes..." chronology
Punk Goes Metal (2000)	Punk Goes Pop (2002)	Punk Goes Acoustic (2003)

Punk Goes Pop is the second album in the Punk Goes... series and the first installment in the long running Punk Goes Pop series created by Fearless Records. It contains a collection of songs by various artists performing covers of pop songs. It was released on April 2, 2002. Its success caused Fearless to release more pop cover albums. As of 2017 there have been seven total Punk Goes Pop albums, more than any other in the franchise.

== Track listing ==
#	Title	Artist	Original Artist(s)	Length
1.	"I Want It That Way"	Dynamite Boy	The Backstreet Boys	3:32
2.	"Candy"	Slick Shoes	Mandy Moore	3:31
3.	"Everywhere"	Yellowcard	Michelle Branch	3:35
4.	"Get This Party Started"	Stretch Arm Strong	P!nk	2:04
5.	"Like a Prayer"	Rufio	Madonna	3:49
6.	"Bye Bye Bye"	Further Seems Forever	NSYNC	3:25
7.	"Crush"	Noise Ratchet	Mandy Moore	3:02
8.	"I'm Like a Bird"	Element 101	Nelly Furtado	3:50
9.	"Survivor"	Knockout	Destiny's Child featuring Da Brat	2:24
10.	"I'm Real"	The Starting Line	Jennifer Lopez featuring Ja Rule	3:28
11.	"The Way You Love Me"	Keepsake	Faith Hill	4:12
12.	"Sometimes"	Reach the Sky	Britney Spears	3:34
13.	"All or Nothing"	Fake ID	O-Town	3:20
14.	"Borderline"	Showoff	Madonna	3:39
15.	"Send Me an Angel"	Thrice	Real Life	3:24
16.	"...Baby One More Time"	NICOTINE	Britney Spears	2:33
17.	"Heaven Is a Place on Earth"	Student Rick	Belinda Carlisle	3:27
