= So They Say =

American rock band

- Also known as: STS
- Origin: St. Louis, Missouri, United States
- Genres: Alternative rock; pop rock; post-hardcore; pop punk
- Years active: 2005–present
- Label: Fearless
- Members: David Schroeder; Joseph Hamilton; Cory Laneman; Mike Guffey; Alan Meyer
- Past members: Nicholas Walters; Joe Hoermann; Justin Hanson; Alex Wilkinson

So They Say is an American rock band based in St. Louis, Missouri, United States. They released their self-titled debut EP in 2005. Shortly after, in 2006, they released their debut studio album, Antidote for Irony on Fearless Records. They recorded the follow-up album, Life In Surveillance with Matt Hyde (No Doubt, Slayer, Parkway Drive, Deftones),released on October 9, 2007. So They Say appeared on Warped Tour 2007, 2006 and one week on Warped Tour 2005. In April 2008 the band decided to take some time off to pursue other musical tastes. Justin Hanson is currently playing drums in the band 3TEETH, Nicholas Walters is currently working in the music industry. David and Joseph went on to play in a band called Me Verse You. In late 2010, David and Joseph put out a statement saying: "After taking some time off to clear our heads, and pursue various musical projects, Dave and I have realized when we were listening to our newest batch of demos that it was So They Say." The band then added Cory Laneman on drums, and Alex Wilkinson on lead guitar. In late 2024, the band announced its decision to reunite, bringing back former members Justin Hanson and Mike Guffey, alongside a new addition to the lineup, Alan Meyer on rhythm guitar. As of 2025 they are writing new material with plans to release it later in the year.

== Band members ==
- David Schroeder: vocals, rhythm guitar (2005–2010, 2010–present)
- Joseph Hamilton: bass (2010–present), lead vocals (2005–present)
- Cory Laneman: drums (2008–present)
- Mike Guffey: lead guitar (2005–present)
- Alan Meyer: rhythm guitar (2024-present)

Former members:

- Nicholas Walters: lead guitar (2005-2008)
- Joe Hoermann: bass (2006–2010)
- Chris Dickey: bass (2005–2006)
- Alex Wilkinson: lead guitar (2008–present)
- Justin Hanson: drums (2005–2008)

== Discography ==
- So They Say (2005)
- Antidote for Irony (2006)
- Life in Surveillance (2007)
- "Untitled E.P." (2011)
