= Fearless Records =

American independent record label

- Parent company: BMG Rights Management
- Founded: 1994
- Founder: Bob Becker
- Distributors: Universal Music Group; RED Distribution (former); Craft Recordings (reissues)
- Genre: Post-hardcore; pop-punk; alternative rock; metalcore; punk rock; pop rock
- Country of origin: United States
- Location: Culver City, California
- Official website: fearlessrecords.com

Fearless Records is an American independent record label that was founded in 1994. Fearless is based in Culver City, California, and is best known for its early pop punk moments captured in the Fearless Flush Sampler and Punk Bites releases, as well as additional releases by bands such as Bigwig and Dynamite Boy; and later Sugarcult; Plain White T's; the Aquabats; Amely; and post-hardcore releases by At the Drive-In and Anatomy of a Ghost. However, the label has experimented with different styles in recent years. Acts such as Blessthefall, Bloodywood, the Word Alive, Ice Nine Kills, Mayday Parade, Pierce the Veil, Starset, the Pretty Reckless, Underoath and the Color Morale have showcased post-hardcore, metalcore, hard rock and alternative rock bands that have emerged in recent years. Fearless Records' releases were distributed in the US by RED Distribution, but since Concord Music Group's purchase of the label in 2015 (who would later merge with BMG Rights Management) it has been distributed by Universal Music Group worldwide.

== History ==
Bob Becker started Fearless Records when he was selling his friends records at their shows. He would also go to record stores and put their records on consignment. The record label name came from Becker not knowing what he was doing at the time and "not being afraid to jump in head first." Fearless Records was officially formed in 1994.

In 2000, Fearless Records released Punk Goes Metal, the first compilation album from the Punk Goes... series. Since then the Punk Goes... series has expanded. It has included seven Punk Goes Pop releases, two Punk Goes Acoustic releases, Punk Goes 80's and 90's, Punk Goes Crunk, Punk Goes Classic Rock, and Punk Goes X which features cover songs that were featured at the 2011 Winter X Games. Punk Goes Pop 5 was released on November 6, 2012. On January 1, 2014, Fearless Records released a video on their page on YouTube announcing bands that will be releasing albums in 2014 and also announced Fearless Records' compilation of Punk Goes 90's 2.

In 2005, Fearless Records released the studio album All That We Needed by Plain White T's, a thirteen-song collection that proved to be a breakthrough for both the label and the Illinois-based band. "Hey There Delilah", a single from that album, reached No. 1 on the Billboard Hot 100, became a success for the label and was certified as a multi-platinum single.

On November 8, 2010, Fearless announced the release of a Christmas-themed compilation album, titled 'Tis the Season to Be Fearless. It would feature eight of their signed artists recording original songs. The album was available for pre-ordering on iTunes the same day, and was released on November 22, 2010. Three years later, Fearless Records released Punk Goes Christmas featuring original & cover tracks from All Time Low, Issues, New Found Glory, and more.

In 2011, Fearless Records released Breathe Carolina's album Hell Is What You Make It. "Blackout", a single from the album, became another success for the label. It debuted at No. 32 on the Billboard Hot 100 and was certified as a gold single.

In October 2012, Fearless Records announced that they had launched a sister label called "Old Friends Records", which would sign more indie rock artists including Hellogoodbye. In November 2013, Fearless Records announced a second imprint label called "Outerloop Records", along with their first signing Ice Nine Kills.

The label, with a back-catalog of about 150 albums, was acquired by Concord Bicycle Music in May 2015 for an estimated $10,000,000.

== Artists ==
- American Teeth
- Archetypes Collide
- August Burns Red
- Beartooth
- Boys Like Girls
- Bloodywood
- Capstan
- Carlie Hanson
- Cenobia
- Chase Atlantic
- chokecherry
- Don Broco
- Eat Your Heart Out
- Flat Black
- From First to Last
- I Prevail
- Ice Nine Kills
- Locket
- LØLØ
- Lost Souls
- Movements
- My Enemies & I (Unknown status)
- My Kid Brother
- NOT A TOY
- Kill the Lights
- Parting Gift
- Pierce the Veil
- Plain White T's
- The Plot in You
- The Pretty Reckless
- The Requiem
- Starset
- Taylor Acorn
- TSS
- Until I Wake
- Varials
- Volumes
- Wage War
- Windwaker
- Wind Walkers
- Young the Giant

=== Old Friends Records artists ===
- Carousel
- Hellogoodbye
- The Static Jacks
- Wild Party

=== Former ===
- 30 Foot Fall (on It's Opposite Day And I Love You Records)
- Alesana (on Revival Recordings)
- The Almighty Trigger Happy
- The Almost
- Anatomy of a Ghost (disbanded)
- Amely (disbanded)
- The Aquabats (unsigned)
- Artist vs. Poet (unsigned)
- As It Is (on Slam Dunk Records)
- A Skylit Drive (disbanded)
- A Static Lullaby (inactive)
- At the Drive-In (on Rise)
- Bazookas Go Bang! (inactive)
- Beefcake (inactive)
- Bickley
- Bigwig (unsigned)
- Blessthefall (on Rise)
- Blount (inactive)
- Brazil (disbanded)
- Breathe Carolina (on Spinnin)
- Brightwell (inactive)
- Chuck
- Chunk! No, Captain Chunk! (unsigned)
- Classic Case
- The Color Morale (hiatus)
- Cruiserweight (disbanded)
- Dead Lazlo's Place
- The Downtown Fiction (unsigned)
- Drunk In Public
- Dynamite Boy
- Every Avenue (hiatus)
- Eve 6 (on Velocity Records)
- Eye Alaska (disbanded)
- Family Values
- Fed Up
- Follow My Lead (unsigned)
- For All Those Sleeping (disbanded)
- Forever the Sickest Kids (hiatus)
- The Fully Down (disbanded)
- Gatsbys American Dream (inactive)
- Get Scared (unsigned)
- Glasseater (disbanded)
- Glue Gun
- Gob (on New Damage)
- Go Radio (disbanded)
- Grabbers
- Grayscale
- I Dont Know How but They Found Me (on Concord)
- Invisible Boss
- Jason Lancaster
- Junction 18
- Jakiro
- Keepsake
- The Killing Moon
- The Kinison
- Knockout
- Let's Get It
- Logan Square
- Lonely Kings
- Lostprophets (disbanded)
- The Maine (on Photo Finish/8123 Records)
- Mayday Parade (on Many Hats Endeavors)
- Milestones (disbanded)
- The Morning Light
- Motionless in White (on Roadrunner)
- Motherfist
- Near Miss
- Nipdrivers
- Oceans Ate Alaska (independent)
- The Outline (disbanded)
- Patton Thomas
- Portugal. The Man (on Atlantic)
- Real Friends (on Pure Noise)
- Red Fish
- Rock Kills Kid (disbanded)
- RPM
- Set It Off (unsigned)
- So They Say
- Sparks the Rescue (unsigned)
- The Starting Line
- Straight Faced
- Sugarcult (hiatus)
- Superman Please Don't
- The Summer Set (on LAB Records)
- Sworn In (disbanded)
- Tonight Alive (inactive)
- Trevor Daniel
- Underoath (on MNRK Music Group)
- Upon This Dawning (disbanded)
- The White Noise (disbanded)
- The Word Alive (on Thriller)
- Whitekaps (also known as White Caps)
- Yesterdays Rising (disbanded)

== See also ==
- List of record labels
