= Breathe Carolina discography =

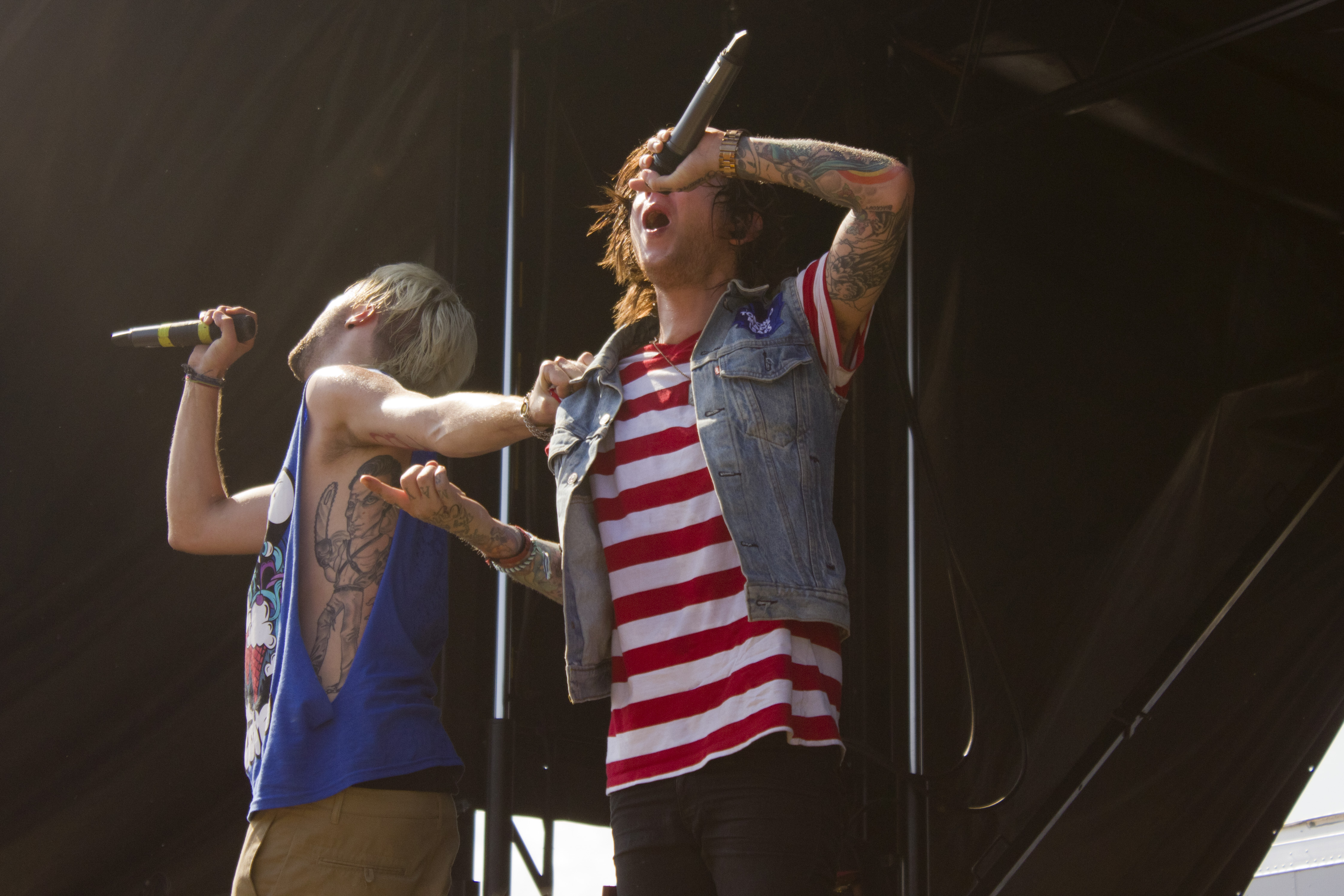
- Breathe Carolina at Warped Tour in 2012
- Studio albums: 5
- Extended plays: 11
- Singles: 79
- Music videos: 56
- Remix albums: 1

Breathe Carolina is an American electronic dance music duo, formed in Denver, Colorado, in 2007. They have released five studio albums, eleven extended plays and seventy-nine singles. Their debut studio album, It's Classy, Not Classic was released on September 16, 2008, and peaked at No. 186 on the Billboard 200. Their second studio album, Hello Fascination was released on August 18, 2009, and peaked at No. 43 on the Billboard 200. Their third studio album, Hell Is What You Make It was released on July 12, 2011, and peaked at No. 42, selling 64,000 copies to date. Their fourth studio album, Savages was released on April 15, 2014, and peaked at No. 22 on the Billboard 200. The album also topped the US Top Dance Albums chart. Their fifth studio album, Deadthealbum was released on November 15, 2019.

They released a cover of Jay Sean's "Down" for the Punk Goes Pop Volume 03. album. The song peaked at No. 31 on the Billboard Rock Digital Song Sales chart. The album's lead single from Hell Is What You Make It and their breakout hit "Blackout" was released on June 14, 2011. The song peaked at No. 32 on the Billboard Hot 100 and was certified Platinum by the Recording Industry Association of America. Additionally, "Hit and Run", "Savages", "Bang It Out" and "Stars & Moon" have reached the Billboard Dance Songs charts.

== Albums ==
=== Studio albums ===
List of studio albums, with selected chart positions and sales figures
Title	Album details	Peak chart positions							Sales
Title	Album details	US	US Alt	US Dance	US Heat	US Indie	US Rock	AUS	Sales
It's Classy, Not Classic	Released: September 16, 2008; Label: Rise; Format: CD, digital download	186	—	5	6	24	—	—	US: 50,000
Hello Fascination	Released: August 18, 2009; Label: Fearless; Format: CD, digital download	43	8	2	—	5	11	—	US: 60,000
Hell Is What You Make It	Released: July 12, 2011; Label: Fearless; Format: CD, digital download	42	8	2	—	9	10	—	US: 64,000
Savages	Released: April 15, 2014; Label: Fearless; Format: CD, digital download	22	4	1	—	3	5	— (Note: Savages did not enter the ARIA Albums Chart, but peaked at number nine on the ARIA Hitseekers Albums Chart.)	US: 14,000
Deadthealbum	Released: November 15, 2019; Label: Spinnin'; Format: Digital download, streaming	—	—	— (Note: Deadthealbum did not enter the Billboard Top Dance/Electronic Albums chart, but peaked at number 6 on the Dance/Electronic Album Sales chart.)	—	—	—	—	
"—" denotes a recording that did not chart or was not released in that territory.

=== Remix albums ===
List of remix albums
Title	Details
Deadtheremixes	Released: April 24, 2020; Label: Spinnin'; Format: Digital download, streaming

=== Mixtapes ===
List of mixtapes
Title	Details
Bangers	Released: July 6, 2013; Label: Sol Republic; Format: Digital download

== Extended plays ==
List of extended plays, with selected chart positions and sales figures
Title	Album details	Peak chart positions		Sales
Title	Album details	US Dance	US Indie	Sales
Gossip	Released: November 26, 2007; Label: Self-released; Format: Digital download	―	―	
Acoustic	Released: August 31, 2015; Label: Self-released; Format: Digital download	―	―	
Thank You	Released: September 28, 2015; Label: Self-released; Format: Digital download	―	―	
More Than Ever: The Thank You	Released: November 22, 2015; Label: Spinnin' Records; Format: Digital download	―	―	
Ruins: The Thank You	Released: January 2, 2016; Label: Spinnin' Records / Doorn Records; Format: Digital download	―	―	
Sleepless	Released: September 16, 2016; Label: Spinnin' Records; Format: Digital download	4	36	US: 2,000
Oh So Hard	Released: December 23, 2016; Label: Spinnin' Records; Format: Digital download	―	―	
Coma	Released: July 14, 2017; Label: Spinnin' Records; Format: Digital download	―	―	
Oh So Hard: Part 2	Released: February 9, 2018; Label: Spinnin' Records; Format: Digital download	―	―	
Deadtheacoustic	Released: December 20, 2019; Label: Spinnin' Records; Format: Digital download, streaming	―	―	
Raindrops	Released: March 8, 2024; Label: Self-released (distributed by Collabhouse)	—	—	
"—" denotes a recording that did not chart or was not released in that territory.

== Singles ==
List of singles, with selected chart positions, sales figures and certifications
Title	Year	Peak chart positions										Sales	Certifications	Album
Title	Year	US	US Dance	US Rock Dig.	AUT	CAN	GER	NZ	SCO	SVK	UK	Sales	Certifications	Album
"Diamonds"	2009	—	—	—	—	—	—	—	—	—	—			It's Classy, Not Classic
"Hello Fascination"	2009	—	—	—	—	—	—	—	—	—	—			Hello Fascination
"I.D.G.A.F."	2010	—	—	—	—	—	—	—	—	—	—			Hello Fascination
"Down"	2010	—	—	31	—	—	—	—	—	—	—			Punk Goes Pop Volume 03.
"Blackout"	2011	32	25	4	66	94	76	32	20	56	21	US: 400,000; WW: 1,000,000+	RIAA: Platinum	Hell Is What You Make It
"Hit and Run"	2012	—	— (Note: "Hit and Run" did not enter the Billboard Hot Dance/Electronic Songs chart, but peaked at number 19 on the Dance/Electronic Digital Song Sales chart.)	—	—	—	—	—	—	—	—	US: 20,000		Hell Is What You Make It
"Savages"	2013	—	47	—	—	—	—	—	—	—	—			Savages
"Sellouts"	2014	—	—	—	—	—	—	—	—	—	—			Savages
"Bang It Out"	2014	—	— (Note: "Bang It Out" did not enter the Billboard Hot Dance/Electronic Songs chart, but peaked at number 44 on the Dance/Electronic Digital Song Sales chart.)	—	—	—	—	—	—	—	—			Savages
"Chasing Hearts"	2014	—	—	—	—	—	—	—	—	—	—			Savages
"Collide"	2014	—	—	—	—	—	—	—	—	—	—			Savages
"I Don't Know What I'm Doing"	2014	—	—	—	—	—	—	—	—	—	—			Savages
"Anywhere But Home" (with APEK)	2015	—	—	—	—	—	—	—	—	—	—			Non-album singles
"Hero (Satellite)"	2015	—	—	—	—	—	—	—	—	—	—			Non-album singles
"Platinum Hearts" (featuring KARRA)	2015	—	—	—	—	—	—	—	—	—	—			Non-album singles
"More Than Ever" (with Ryos)	2015	—	—	—	—	—	—	—	—	—	—			Sleepless
"Stars & Moon" (with Shanahan featuring Haliene)	2015	—	— (Note: "Stars & Moon" did not enter the Billboard Hot Dance/Electronic Songs chart, but peaked at number 26 on the Dance/Mix Show Airplay chart.)	—	—	—	—	—	—	—	—			Non-album singles
"Ruins" (featuring Angelika Vee)	2016	—	—	—	—	—	—	—	—	—	—			Non-album singles
"Lovin" (with APEK featuring Neon Hitch)	2016	—	—	—	—	—	—	—	—	—	—			Non-album singles
"Soldier" (with Blasterjaxx)	2016	—	—	—	—	—	—	—	—	—	—			Non-album singles
"Marco Polo" (with Bassjackers and REEZ)	2016	—	—	—	—	—	—	—	—	—	—			Non-album singles
"Giants" (with Husman featuring Carah Faye)	2016	—	—	—	—	—	—	—	—	—	—			Non-album singles
"See the Sky" (with Jay Cosmic featuring Haliene)	2016	—	—	—	—	—	—	—	—	—	—			Sleepless
"Stable" (with Crossnaders)	2016	—	—	—	—	—	—	—	—	—	—			Sleepless
"Echo (Let Go)" (with IZII)	2016	—	—	—	—	—	—	—	—	—	—			Non-album single
"Atlantis"	2016	—	—	—	—	—	—	—	—	—	—			Oh So Hard
"Break of Dawn"	2016	—	—	—	—	—	—	—	—	—	—			Oh So Hard
"Can't Take It" (with Bassjackers featuring CADE)	2017	—	—	—	—	—	—	—	—	—	—			Non-album singles
"Up All Night" (with Streex)	2017	—	—	—	—	—	—	—	—	—	—			Non-album singles
"Rhythm Is a Dancer" (with Dropgun featuring Kaleena Zanders)	2017	—	—	—	—	—	—	—	—	—	—			Non-album singles
"Glue"	2017	—	—	—	—	—	—	—	—	—	—			Coma
"This Again"	2017	—	—	—	—	—	—	—	—	—	—			Coma
"For U"	2017	—	—	—	—	—	—	—	—	—	—			Coma
"Hotel" (with Flatdisk)	2017	—	—	—	—	—	—	—	—	—	—			Non-album singles
"The Fever"	2017	—	—	—	—	—	—	—	—	—	—			Non-album singles
"DYSYLM" (with Sunstar)	2018	—	—	—	—	—	—	—	—	—	—			Non-album singles
"Long Live House Music" (with Delayers)	2018	—	—	—	—	—	—	—	—	—	—			Non-album singles
"Sweet Dreams" (with Dropgun featuring Kaleena Zanders)	2018	—	—	—	—	—	—	—	—	—	—			Non-album singles
"Feel It" (with Sunstars)	2018	—	—	—	—	—	—	—	—	—	—			Non-album singles
"Do It Right" (with Lucas & Steve and Sunstars)	2018	—	—	—	—	—	—	—	—	—	—			Non-album singles
"My Love" (with Robert Falcon)	2018	—	—	—	—	—	—	—	—	—	—			Non-album singles
"Headshot" (with SLVR featuring TITUS)	2018	—	—	—	—	—	—	—	—	—	—			Non-album singles
"Stronger" (with Raven and Kreyn)	2019	—	—	—	—	—	—	—	—	—	—			Non-album singles
"All I Need" (with Jordan Jay)	2019	—	—	—	—	—	—	—	—	—	—			Non-album singles
"Get Away" (with Asketa and Natan Chaim featuring Rama Duke)	2019	—	—	—	—	—	—	—	—	—	—			Non-album singles
"Too Good"	2019	—	—	—	—	—	—	—	—	—	—			Dead: The Album
"Like This"	2019	—	—	—	—	—	—	—	—	—	—			Dead: The Album
"Drive"	2019	—	—	—	—	—	—	—	—	—	—			Dead: The Album
"July"	2019	—	—	—	—	—	—	—	—	—	—			Dead: The Album
"That's My Music"	2020	—	—	—	—	—	—	—	—	—	—			Non-album singles
"Higher" (with Jordan Jay)	2020	—	—	—	—	—	—	—	—	—	—			Non-album singles
"If U" (with Robert Falcon and Conor Maynard)	2020	—	—	—	—	—	—	—	—	—	—			Non-album singles
"Promises" (with Dropgun featuring Reigns)	2020	—	— (Note: "Promises" did not enter the Billboard Dance/Electronic Songs chart, but peaked at number eight on the Dance/Electronic Digital Song Sales chart.)	—	—	—	—	—	—	—	—			Non-album singles
"23"	2021	—	—	—	—	—	—	—	—	—	—			Non-album singles
"Vibes" (with Raven and Kreyn)	2021	—	—	—	—	—	—	—	—	—	—			Non-album singles
"Crossfire" (featuring SMBDY)	2021	—	—	—	—	—	—	—	—	—	—			Non-album singles
"Get Back" (with SMACK featuring TITUS)	2021	—	—	—	—	—	—	—	—	—	—			Non-album singles
"I Do It to Myself"	2021	—	—	—	—	—	—	—	—	—	—			Non-album singles
"Ridiculous"	2022	—	—	—	—	—	—	—	—	—	—			Non-album singles
"Something" (with Martin Garrix)	2022	—	—	—	—	—	—	—	—	—	—			STMPD RCRDS & Tomorrowland Music EP
"The Ride"	2022	—	—	—	—	—	—	—	—	—	—			Non-album singles
"Nobody Loves You" (with farfetch'd)	2022	—	—	—	—	—	—	—	—	—	—			Non-album singles
"Dancing in the Dark" (with ManyFew)	2023	—	—	—	—	—	—	—	—	—	—			Non-album singles
"Wifi"	2023	—	—	—	—	—	—	—	—	—	—			Non-album singles
"Sick"	2023	—	—	—	—	—	—	—	—	—	—			Non-album singles
"Dimensions"	2023	—	—	—	—	—	—	—	—	—	—			Non-album singles
"Safe & Sound" (with ARKINS)	2023	—	—	—	—	—	—	—	—	—	—			Non-album singles
"Novocaine" (with Ryos and SGNLS)	2023	—	—	—	—	—	—	—	—	—	—			Non-album singles
"Finally" (with Abi Flynn)	2024	—	—	—	—	—	—	—	—	—	—			Non-album singles
"Drag Me Down"	2024	—	—	—	—	—	—	—	—	—	—			Raindrops
"Alone Tonight"	2024	—	—	—	—	—	—	—	—	—	—			Raindrops
"Dumb" (with Nikki Vianna)	2024	—	—	—	—	—	—	—	—	—	—			Non-album singles
"Long Night" (with STVW)	2024	—	—	—	—	—	—	—	—	—	—			Non-album singles
"Somebody"	2024	—	—	—	—	—	—	—	—	—	—			Non-album singles
"New Sound"	2024	—	—	—	—	—	—	—	—	—	—			Non-album singles
"Dance All Night"	2024	—	—	—	—	—	—	—	—	—	—			Non-album singles
"Scream"	2024	—	—	—	—	—	—	—	—	—	—			Non-album singles
"Lightspeed"	2024	—	—	—	—	—	—	—	—	—	—			Non-album singles
"Miracle"	2025	—	—	—	—	—	—	—	—	—	—			Non-album singles
"—" denotes a recording that did not chart or was not released in that territory.

=== Promotional singles ===
Title	Year	Album
"Welcome to Savannah"	2009	Hello Fascination
"Wooly"	2011	Hell Is What You Make It
"Sweat It Out"	2011	Hell Is What You Make It
"Reaching for the Floor"	2012	Hell Is What You Make It: Reloaded

== Music videos ==
Title	Year	Director(s)	Ref.
"Diamonds"	2008	Robby Starbuck	
"Hello Fascination"	2010	Spence Nicholson	
"I.D.G.A.F."	2010	Hannah Lux Davis	
"Down" (Jay Sean cover)	2010	MOTIONarmy	
"Blackout"	2011	Travis Kopach	
"Hit and Run"	2012	Travis Kopach	
"Sellouts" (featuring Danny Worsnop)	2014	Dan Centrone	
"Bang It Out" (featuring Karmin)	2014	Drew Russ	
"Chasing Hearts" (featuring Tyler Carter)	2014	Jade Elher	
"Collide"	2014	Tony Tomasino	
"I Don't Know What I'm Doing (Reboot)" (with Oscar Olivo)	2014	Unknown	
"Shadows"	2014	Tony Tomasino	
"Anywhere But Home" (with APEK)	2015	Unknown	
"Hero (Satellite)" (with Y&V)	2015	Tony Tomasino	
"Platinum Hearts" (featuring Karra)	2015	Tony Tomasino	
"More Than Ever" (with Ryos)	2015	Tony Tomasino	
"Ruins" (featuring Angelica Vee)	2016	Unknown	
"Soldier" (with Blasterjaxx)	2016	Unknown	
"Marco Polo" (with Bassjackers and Reez)	2016	Unknown	
"See the Sky" (with Jay Cosmic and Haliene)	2016	Unknown	
"Stable" (with Crossnaders)	2016	Unknown	
"Nights" (with Inukshuk)	2016	Unknown	
"Echo (Let Go)" (with IZII)	2016	Ethan Jacob	
"Atlantis" (with Dropgun)	2016	Unknown	
"Break Of Dawn" (with Swede Dreams)	2016	Unknown	
"Can't Take It" (with Bassjackers featuring Cade)	2017	Unknown	
"Up All Night" (with Streex)	2017	Ridge Production	
"Rhythm Is A Dancer" (with Dropgun featuring Kaleena Zanders)	2017	Unknown	
"Glue"	2017	Unknown	
"This Again"	2017	Unknown	
"For U"	2017	Unknown	
"Hotel" (with Flatdisk)	2017	Unknown	
"The Fever" (with Bassjackers and APEK)	2017	Vincent Vianen	
"DYSYLM" (with Sunstars)	2018	Unknown	
"Ravers" (with KEVU)	2018	Unknown	
"F*ck It Up" (with Tynan featuring Crichy Crich)	2018	Unknown	
"Long Live House Music" (with Delayers)	2018	Unknown	
"Sweet Dreams" (with Dropgun featuring Kaleena Zanders)	2018	Unknown	
"Feel It" (with Sunstars)	2018	Unknown	
"Do It Right" (with Lucas & Steve and Sunstars)	2018	Unknown	
"My Love" (with Robert Falcon)	2018	Unknown	
"Headshot" (with SLVR featuring TITUS)	2018	Unknown	
"Stronger" (with Raven and Kreyn)	2019	Unknown	
"All I Need" (with Jordan Jay)	2019	Unknown	
"Get Away" (with Asketa and Natan Chaim featuring Rama Duke)	2019	Unknown	
"Too Good"	2019	Jade Ehlers and Ryan Watanabe	
"Like This"	2019	Jade Ehlers and Ryan Watanabe	
"Drive"	2019	Jade Ehlers and Ryan Watanabe	
"July"	2019	Jade Ehlers and Ryan Watanabe	
"That's My Music"	2020	Unknown	
"Higher" (with Jordan Jay)	2020	Unknown	
"Promises" (with Dropgun featuring Reigns)	2020	Unknown	
"23"	2021	Unknown	
"Vibes" (with Raven and Kreyn)	2021	Unknown	
"Get Back" (with SMACK featuring TITUS)	2021	Unknown	
"Something" (with Martin Garrix)	2022	Unknown	

== Other appearances ==
Year	Title	Album
2008	"The 1st and Last Time" (with Electric Valentine)	Friends With Benefits EP
2009	"See You Again" (Miley Cyrus cover)	Punk Goes Pop 2
2009	"Fame & Riches, Rehab Bitches" (with Jeffree Star)	Beauty Killer
2009	"All For You" (with Kill Paradise)	The Second Effect
2010	"I Live High" (T. Mills featuring David Schmitt)	Ready, Fire, Aim!
2010	"Mile High Christmas"	'Tis the Season to Be Fearless
2010	"Down" (Jay Sean cover)	Punk Goes Pop 3
2012	"Dream" (with Before Their Eyes)	Redemption
2012	"Billie Jean" (Michael Jackson cover)	Punk Goes Pop 5
2012	"Start the Party" (It Boys! featuring David Schmitt)	Non-album single
2013	"Wake Up" (Kill Paradise featuring David Schmitt)	Cover Your Eyes
2013	"Make Her Wait" (The Broadway featuring David Schmitt)	Snow White
2014	"Find Someone" (with Candyland)	Non-album singles
2014	"I Don't Know What I'm Doing (Reboot)" (with Oscar Olivo)	Non-album singles
2015	"All I Wanna" (with Disco Fries)	Autonomous
2015	"This Is How We Do It" (Montell Jordan cover)	Thank You EP

== Remixes ==
Year	Song	Original artist	Other remixer(s)
2014	"Get On It"	The Kin	Andrew Goldstein
2014	"Blue (Da Ba Dee)"	Eiffel 65	Andrew Goldstein
2014	"Mosh Pit"	Flosstradamus (featuring Casino)	—N/a
2014	"Sleepless"	Cazzette	—N/a
2014	"End of an Empire"	Celldweller	—N/a
2014	"Vermillion"	Sofi De La Torre	—N/a
2014	"Pyramids"	DVBBS and Dropgun (featuring Sanjin)	—N/a
2015	"X"	Dyro and Bassjackers	Charity Strike
2015	"Blood"	Archis	Apek
2015	"Steal Your Heart"	Brklyn (featuring Lenachka)	—N/a
2016	"Safe"	Cuebrick and Apek (featuring Linney)	—N/a
2016	"La La Land"	DVBBS and Shaun Frank (featuring Delaney Jane)	—N/a
2016	"Back 2 U"	Steve Aoki and Boehm (featuring Walk the Moon)	—N/a
2016	"The Moment (Novell)"	Nicky Romero	—N/a
2016	"Love Me Crazy"	Sultan + Shepard (featuring Gia)	—N/a
2016	"Cold Water"	Major Lazer (featuring Justin Bieber and MØ)	Apek
2016	"Lover in Dark"	Benta	—N/a
2016	"Can't Fight It"	Quintino and Cheat Codes	—N/a
2017	"Heaven"	Mokita	—N/a
2017	"Fade Away"	Sam Feldt and Lush & Simon (featuring Inna)	—N/a
2017	"Goodbye"	Mokita and Maty Noyes	—N/a
2017	"In The Music"	Liquid Todd and Disco Killerz (featuring Hannah Rose)	—N/a
2017	"You Could Be"	R3hab and Khrebto	—N/a
2018	"High And Low"	Sam Feldt (featuring Joshua Radin)	—N/a
2018	"We Are The Night"	Madison Mars (featuring Sanjana Ghosh)	—N/a
2018	"Happier"	Marshmello (featuring Bastille)	—N/a
2018	"Booyah"	Showtek (featuring We Are Loud and Sonny Wilson)	—N/a
2019	"Just To Feel Alive"	Sam Feldt (featuring Jrm)	—N/a
2019	"Call You"	Cash Cash (featuring Nasri)	—N/a
2019	"When You Leave"	Nikki Vianna and Matoma	—N/a
2019	"I Don't Belong in This Club"	Why Don't We and Macklemore	—N/a
2019	"All Star"	Smash Mouth	—N/a
2020	"Nobody"	Kelsey Coleman	—N/a
2020	"Who's Laughing Now"	Ava Max	—N/a
2020	"Funny"	Zedd and Jasmine Thompson	—N/a
2021	"The One That Got Away"	Hunter Hayes	
