= List of Spinnin' Records artists =

This is a list of artists who have either been signed to Spinnin' Records or had material released through the label or its sub-labels.

== 0–9 ==
- 4 Strings

== A ==
- Adventure Club
- Afrojack
- Alok
- Alvaro
- Rene Amesz
- Cato Anaya
- Steve Angello
- Anjulie
- Ansol
- Steve Aoki
- Stevie Appleton
- Arty
- Audien
- Audio Bullys
- Autograf
- Autolaser
- Danny Ávila

== B ==
- Bassjackers
- Bassnectar
- Basto
- Beauz
- Marc Benjamin
- Bingo Players
- Blasterjaxx
- BLR
- Leon Bolier
- Borgeous
- Borgore
- Bougenvilla
- Breathe Carolina
- Brohug
- Byor

== C ==
- Michael Calfan
- Candyland
- Carnage
- Cash Cash
- The Chainsmokers
- Cheat Codes
- Chemical Surf
- Chocolate Puma
- John Christian
- Chuckie
- Cid
- CMC$
- Crossnaders
- Curbi

== D ==
- Daddy's Groove
- John Dahlbäck
- Dannic
- Ferreck Dawn
- Daya
- Jordy Dazz
- Declain
- Deepend
- Don Diablo
- Dimitri Vegas & Like Mike
- Dirty Disco Youth
- DJ Bl3nd
- DJ Diesel
- Norman Doray
- Dropgun
- DubVision
- Dvbbs
- Dyro

== E ==
- EDX
- Egzod
- Nora En Pure
- Ephwurd
- Eptic

== F ==
- Sam Feldt
- Felguk
- Firebeatz
- Sam Fischer
- Joel Fletcher
- Sophie Francis
- Shaun Frank
- Funkin Matt

== G ==
- Garmiani
- Martin Garrix
- Cedric Gervais
- Thomas Gold
- Good Times Ahead
- Toby Green
- David Guetta

== H ==
- Hard Rock Sofa
- Jay Hardway
- Hardwell
- Mike Hawkins
- Headhunterz
- Oliver Heldens
- The Him
- Hook n Sling
- Marten Hørger

== I ==
- Iceleak
- Inna
- i_o

== J ==
- Felix Jaehn
- Jauz
- Julian Jordan

== K ==
- Kaiz
- Kaskade
- Alex Kenji
- Dante Klein
- Sander Kleinenberg
- Mathieu Koss
- Kratex
- Kris Kross Amsterdam
- Kryder
- Kshmr

== L ==
- Fedde Le Grand
- Lifelike
- Lost Stories
- Lucas & Steve
- Lucky Charmes
- Lumix
- Lvndscape

== M ==
- Makj
- Bruno Martini
- Marf
- Matisse & Sadko
- Conor Maynard
- Kris Menace
- Merk & Kremont
- Mightyfools
- Moguai
- Moti
- Möwe
- Mr. Belt & Wezol

== N ==
- Matt Nash
- Nervo
- Nitti

== O ==
- Winona Oak
- Ofenbach
- Öwnboss
- Ummet Ozcan

== P ==
- Para One
- Parkah & Durzo
- Pep & Rash
- Pickle
- Gabry Ponte
- Anton Powers
- Justin Prime
- Promise Land

== Q ==
- Quarterhead
- Quintino

== R ==
- R3hab
- Rave & Crave
- Nicky Romero
- Chico Rose
- Dave Ruthwell
- Rune RK

== S ==
- Gregor Salto
- Sidney Samson
- SayMyName
- Robin Schulz
- Showtek
- Shreyas
- Sick Individuals
- Mr. Sid
- Sikdope
- Skytech
- Sleepy Tom
- Soltan
- Martin Solveig
- Will Sparks
- Tom Staar
- Stadiumx
- Starkillers
- Fox Stevenson
- Joe Stone
- Subshock & Evangelos
- Swanky Tunes
- Tom Swoon

== T ==
- Tchami
- TheFatRat
- Throttle
- Tiësto
- Tigerlily
- TJR
- David Tort
- Timmy Trumpet
- Tujamo
- Tungevaag
- Two Friends

== V ==
- Sander van Doorn
- Armand van Helden
- Vassy
- Vicetone
- Vinai
- Vintage Culture

== W ==
- Watermät
- Wave Wave
- Mike Williams
- Wiwek

== Y ==
- Yellow Claw
- Yultron
- Yves V

== Z ==
- Zaeden
- Zeds Dead
- Zeeba
- Ziggy
- ZROQ
