= Gossip (disambiguation) =

Gossip is idle talk about the personal affairs of others.

Gossip may also refer to:

== Film and television ==
- Gossip (1923 film), an American silent film directed by King Baggot
- Gossip (unfinished film), an unfinished 1982 British drama directed by Don Boyd
- Gossip (2000 American film), a teen drama directed by Davis Guggenheim
- Gossip (2000 Swedish film), a comedy/drama directed by Colin Nutley
- Gossip (2026 film), an Indian Telugu-language drama film
- Gossip (TV series), a 2021 American documentary series
- "Gossip" (Desperate Housewives), a television episode
- "Gossip" (The Office), an American television episode
- Gayle Gossip, a character in the animated series Ninjago

== Music ==
=== Bands ===
- Gossip (band), an American indie rock band

=== Albums ===
- Gossip (Paul Kelly and the Coloured Girls album) or the title song, 1986
- Gossip (Sleeping with Sirens album) or the title song, 2017
- Gossip, an EP by Breathe Carolina, 2007
- The Gossip, an EP by Gossip, 2000

=== Songs ===
- "Gossip" (Confidence Man and Jade Thirlwall song), 2025
- "Gossip" (Lil Wayne song), 2007
- "Gossip" (Måneskin song), 2023
- "Gossip" (Vanessa Amorosi song), 2011
- "Gossip", by Nadine Coyle from Nadine, 2018
- "Gossip", by Tame Impala from Currents, 2015
- "Gossip", by You Me at Six from Take Off Your Colours, 2008
- "Gossip", from the musical Once on This Island, 1990

== People ==
- Alex Gossip (1862–1952), Scottish trade union leader and political activist
- George H. D. Gossip (1841–1907), American-English chess master and writer

== Other uses ==
- Gossip (video game), a 1983 experimental Atari 400 game by Chris Crawford
- Chinese whispers, or gossip, a party game
- Gossip, a 2002 nonfiction book by Lori Palatnik
- Gossip: A Journal of Lesbian Feminist Ethics, published by Onlywomen Press 1986–1988

== See also ==
- Gossip protocol, a structured interchange of messages between agents running on a set of computers in a network
