= Fly By Midnight =

American indie-pop duo

- Origin: New York City, U.S.
- Genres: Indie pop, synth-pop
- Years active: 2014–present
- Members: Justin Bryte; Justin Slaven

Fly By Midnight is an American indie pop musical duo composed of singers Justin Bryte (born January 30, 1993) and Justin Slaven. It was created in 2014 in New York City.

== Early life ==
Bryte is from Arden Heights, Staten Island, while Slaven is from Florida. Bryte graduated from Tottenville High School.

== Career ==
After making music individually, Bryte and Slaven met in 2014 while writing music in the studio, and subsequently decided to make music together. They started out performing covers of songs, before deciding to make original music.

In July 2015, Fly By Midnight released their first original single, "Brooklyn". They released a second single, "Karaoke", in August 2016. Also in 2016, Fly By Midnight released a cover of "We Don't Talk Anymore" by Charlie Puth and Selena Gomez, and Maroon 5's "Don't Wanna Know" with Brielle Von Hugel.

In 2018, Fly By Midnight released two albums, New York Nostalgia and Rerunning. They also performed at the Firefly Music Festival in Dover, Delaware.

In early 2020, Bryte and Slaven moved to Los Angeles. That year, they released "Lost Without You", a single featuring Clara Mae. In 2021, Fly By Midnight released an EP titled Plus One, which features collaborations with Clara Mae, Shoffy, Cailin Russo and Jake Miller, and their fifth album Silver Crane. In 2023, Fly By Midnight released Fictional Illustrations, their sixth studio album.

In July 2025, Fly By Midnight released their seventh album, The Fastest Times of Our Lives. They also went on tour in Asia and Australia in January 2026.

== Influences ==
Bryte and Slaven have named Boys Like Girls, The Outfield, Hall & Oates, Billy Joel and A Day to Remember as being among their influences.

== Discography ==
=== Albums ===
Year	Album title	Release details
2017	Cover Change	Released: June 20, 2017; Format: Digital
2018	New York Nostalgia	Released: March 23, 2018; Format: Digital
2018	Rerunning	Released: November 16, 2018; Format: Digital
2019	Happy About Everything Else...	Released: November 22, 2019; Format: Digital
2021	Silver Crane	Released: November 19, 2021; Format: Digital
2023	Fictional Illustrations	Released: March 24, 2023; Format: Digital
2025	The Fastest Times of Our Lives	Released: July 11, 2025; Format: Digital
