= RKCB =

RKCB may refer to:

- RKCB, a Los Angeles–based alt-pop duo featured in "Speechless" (Candyland song)
- Roman Key Card Blackwood, a bridge convention
