= Murda (song) =

Single by Candyland
- Released: May 19, 2015
- Recorded: 2015
- Genre: Trap; dancehall; hip hop; moombahton
- Length: 2:59
- Label: SMOG Records
- Songwriter: Josephine Martin
- Producer: Candyland

Candyland singles chronology
"Rage In Love" (2015)	"Murda" (2015)	"Speechless" (2015)

"Murda" is the single recorded by American DJ and music producer Candyland. The single was released as Candyland's third single as a solo act on May 19, 2015, although the song premiered exclusively via Billboard one day prior.

== Critical reception ==
"Murda" gained generally positive reviews. Amanda Mesa of Dancing Astronaut complimented the single's "shock value," and stated that the track brought "more than a good dose of intensity." Matthew Meadow of Your EDM also viewed the single positively, calling it "simultaneously infectious." Meadow later claimed that the single would be likely to induce "everyone in the audience to make their best thizz face," as he culminated his review of the single.

== Track listing ==
Digital download
No.	Title	Length
1.	"Murda"	2:59
