= Dropgun =

Russian electronic musician

- Origin: Tomsk, Russia
- Genres: Progressive house, big room house, electro house, future house, future bass, psytrance, dubstep
- Years active: 2013–present
- Labels: Prophecy, Spinnin' Records, Metanoia Music, Dharma Worldwide, Hexagon
- Members: Ilyas Kozhahanov
- Past members: Mike Martinov
- Website: cubedmusic.com

Dropgun was a Russian DJ and production duo from Tomsk, formed by Ilyas Kozhahanov (in Russian Ильяс Кожаханов) and Mike Martinov (in Russian Майк Мартинов). In 2020 Martinov left, leaving the first one to continue the project alone.

He is best known for his 2014 singles Pyramids (with DVBBS brothers and Sanjin) and Amsterdam. The first one reached 39th place on the Belgian charts.

== Discography ==
=== Charting singles ===
Title	Year	Peak chart positions		Album
Title	Year	BEL (Vl)	BEL (Wa)	Album
"Pyramids" (with DVBBS and Sanjin)	2014	39	—	Non-album singles
"Together As One"	2015	—	30^{[A]}	Non-album singles
"—" denotes a recording that did not chart or was not released in that territory.

=== Other singles ===
Only singles and remixes released since October 2012 are listed below:

- 2014: "Shout"
- 2014: "Hayao" (with Ralvero) [DOORN (Spinnin')]
- 2014: "Amsterdam" [Oxygen (Spinnin')]
- 2014: "Angst" [Metanoia Music (Arisa Audio)]
- 2014: "Pyramids" (with DVBBS) [Spinnin' Records]
- 2015: "Cobra" (with Tony Junior) [DOORN (Spinnin')]
- 2015: "Ninja" [Skink (Spinnin')]
- 2015: "Together As One" [Flamingo]
- 2016: "Chronos" (with Jaggs) [Revealed]
- 2016: "One World" (with Swanky Tunes) [Armada Music]
- 2016: "Fever" (with Farleon) [HEXAGON (Spinnin')]
- 2016: "Nobody" [HEXAGON (Spinnin')]
- 2016: "A Better Love" (with Lenx & Denx) [Flamingo]
- 2016: "Atlantis" (with Breathe Carolina) [Spinnin' Premium]
- 2017: "Rhythm Is A Dancer" (with Breathe Carolina) [Spinnin' Records]
- 2017: "All I Want" (with XORR) [Flamingo]
- 2017: "Little Drop" [Spinnin' Premium]
- 2017: "Nothing New" [HEXAGON (Spinnin')]
- 2017: "Really Mine" (with Natan Chaim) [Thrive]
- 2018: "My Way" (with Asketa) [Enhanced]
- 2018: "Krishna" [Dharma (Spinnin')]
- 2018: "Dark Sky" [HEXAGON (Spinnin')]
- 2018: "Next To Me" (with Aspyer) [Musical Freedom (Spinnin')]
- 2018: "Sweet Dreams" (with Breathe Carolina) [Spinnin' Records]
- 2018: "Uluwatu" (with Jesse Wilde) [Dharma (Spinnin')]
- 2018: "Somebody" [Spinnin' Copyright Free]
- 2018: "Island" (with Asketa) [Thrive Music]
- 2018: "Fire Blazing" [Spinnin' Copyright Free]
- 2018: "Earthquake" [Spinnin' Records]
- 2018: "Tomorrow Never Comes" [Future House Music]
- 2018: "Drought" [Hexagon (Spinnin')]
- 2019: "Spirit Of Freedom" [Spinnin' Premium]
- 2019: "I'm On My Way" (with Sebastian Wibe) [Hexagon]
- 2019: "A Little More Like You" [Dharma (Spinnin')]
- 2019: "Same Things" (with Røguenethvn and Pillows) [CYB3RPVNK]
- 2019: "Falling" (with Asketa & Natan Chaim) [Hexagon]
- 2019: "Darkside" (with Do It Big and Arikakito) [Dharma (Spinnin')]
- 2020: "Sanctuary" (with Bassrox) [Dharma (Spinnin')]
- 2020: "Confession" [Generation Hex (Hexagon)]
- 2020: "Annihilation" [Prophecy (Hexagon)]
- 2020: "Chicken Run" [Prophecy (Hexagon)]
- 2020: "Tantsui" [Prophecy (Hexagon)]
- 2020: "Control" [Prophecy (Hexagon)]
- 2020: "Bai Bai Bai" (featuring Dimma Urih) [Prophecy (Hexagon)]
- 2020: "H2S04" [Heldeep]
- 2020: "U&I" (with Christopher Damas) [Hexagon]
- 2020: "Burnt Tires" (featuring Dimma Urih) [Hexagon]
- 2020: "Promises" (with Breathe Carolina featuring Reigns) [Spinnin']
- 2021: "Fisher" (featuring Dimma Urih) [Hexagon]
- 2021: "Open Up Your Mind" (featuring Boba Sheshera and Kíki) [Doorn Records]
- 2021: "Stay" (with Boba Sheshera) [Hexagon]

=== Remixes ===
- 2014: Major Lazer — Aerosol Can (Dropgun Bootleg)
- 2017: Pegboard Nerds & Spyker — Extraordinary (Dropgun Remix)
- 2017: Taku-Hero & Funk Machine — Fun Lovin' (Dropgun Remix) [Revealed Recordings]
- 2017: Breathe Carolina — This Again (Dropgun and Taku-Hero Remix) [Spinnin' Remixes]
- 2017: Brklyn — I'm On Somethin' (Dropgun Remix) [Enhanced Music]
- 2017: Galantis & Throttle — Tell Me You Love Me (Dropgun Remix) [Big Beat]
- 2018: Gryffin — Winnebago (Dropgun Remix) [Darkroom (Geffen)]
- 2019: Grey — Want You Back (Dropgun Remix) [Island]
- 2019: Superspecial — Heroes (Dropgun Remix) [Desirmont]
- 2019: Funk Machine & Taku-Hero — Something (Dropgun Remix) [Revealed Recordings]
- 2019: Armin van Buuren — Turn It Up (Dropgun Remix) [Armind (Armada)]
- 2019: Funk Machine & Taku-Hero — It Ain't Over (Dropgun Remix) [Revealed Recordings]

=== Prophecy recordings discography ===
In March 2020, Dropgun launched their own record label - Prophecy - as a sub-label of Don Diablo's Hexagon label, as part of the label's expansion, which also included the launch of sublabels run by King Arthur, RetroVision and JLV.

- 2020: Dropgun - Annihilation
- 2020: Savage Kids & Lørean - Dark Side
- 2020: Dropgun - Chicken Run
- 2020: Gosha - Get Busy
- 2020: Dropgun - Tantsui
- 2020: Vedde - Best Bud
- 2020: Dropgun - Control
- 2020: Lakros - Quadra
- 2020: Dropgun feat. Dimma Urih - Bai Bai Bai
- 2020: Noiz Van Grane - Re-Education
- 2020: Colourveins & Evernone - Tell Me
- 2020: Dropgun feat. Dimma Urih - Burnt Tires
- 2020: CØDE - Get A Taste
- 2020: Lakros - Cyberland

== Notes ==
- A Did not enter the Ultratop 50, but peaked on the Walloon Ultratip chart.
