= Hannah Rose (album) =

Studio album by Hannah Rose
- Released: May 7, 2013
- Genres: CCM, electropop
- Length: 35:06
- Label: Dream

Hannah Rose is the first studio album by Hannah Rose. Dream Records released the album on May 7, 2013.

== Critical reception ==
Professional ratings
Review scores
Source	Rating
Christian Music Zine	4.25/5
CM Addict	4/5 stars
Indie Vision Music	3/5 stars
Louder Than the Music	3.5/5 stars
New Release Tuesday	3/5 stars

Awarding the album three stars from New Release Tuesday, Sarah Fine states, "while this might not be a perfect album, her enthusiasm for creating something substantial is to be applauded." Jonathan Andre, rating the album three stars for Indie Vision Music, writes, "Well done Hannah for such a well-rounded album full of moments of hope, peace, encouragement and motivation!" Giving the album three and a half stars at Louder Than the Music, Jono Davies says, "If you know someone who enjoys listening to female pop vocalists, then Hannah Rose is a brilliant choice of album for them to get into." Grace Thorson, awarding the album four stars from CM Addict, states, "Keep writing, Hannah Rose. You’re off to an awesome beginning!" Rating the album 4.25 out of five for Christian Music Zine, Joshua Andre writes, "Hannah Rose’s debut is reflective and contemplative, yet fun, bubbly and refreshing as well."

== Track listing ==
All tracks are written by Hannah Rose.

No.	Title	Length
1.	"Sea of Love"	3:50
2.	"It's a Good Life"	3:33
3.	"Eye of the Storm"	3:13
4.	"Permanent Love Scar"	3:30
5.	"You and Me"	3:34
6.	"Keep Moving Forward"	4:15
7.	"When the Music Stops"	2:52
8.	"I Love You for That"	3:40
9.	"Wasting Time"	3:25
10.	"So and So"	3:14
Total length:		35:06
