= Savages (Breathe Carolina album) =

Studio album by Breathe Carolina
- Released: April 15, 2014
- Recorded: 2013
- Genres: Electronic rock; electropop; EDM; post-hardcore; emo pop
- Length: 44:51
- Label: Fearless
- Producer: Ian Kirkpatrick

Breathe Carolina chronology
Hell Is What You Make It (2011)	Savages (2014)	Dead: The Album (2019)

Singles from Savages
- 1. "Savages" Released: November 25, 2013; 2. "Sellouts" Released: February 18, 2014; 3. "Bang It Out" Released: March 18, 2014; 4. "Chasing Hearts" Released: April 15, 2014; 5. "Collide" Released: April 21, 2014; 6. "I Don't Know What I'm Doing" Released: July 1, 2014

Savages is the fourth studio album by electronic band Breathe Carolina released on April 15, 2014, through Fearless Records in the United States. Upon the album's release, it debuted at No. 22 on the US Billboard 200, No. 4 on the Alternative Albums chart, and topped the Dance/Electronic Albums chart, selling 14,000 copies in its first week. The album spawned six singles: "Savages", "Bang It Out" featuring pop duo Karmin, "Sellouts" featuring Danny Worsnop of the metalcore band Asking Alexandria, "Chasing Hearts" featuring Tyler Carter of metalcore group Issues, "Collide" and "I Don't Know What I'm Doing". The album features a more electronic and dance influence rather than the electronic rock and post-hardcore influences seen on the group's previous albums. This is the first album released without former member Kyle Even.

== Background ==
In August 2012, the band confirmed with AbsolutePunk.net that they had started writing material for their fourth studio album. On March 25, 2013, it was announced that the title of the album would be called Savages. In the mean time, the duo announced a free mixtape would be released as soon as early summer. The mixtape, entitled Bangers, was released for free download on July 6, 2013, via Sol Republic. Although it was intended to contain material that was being written for the upcoming album, the departure of Kyle and addition of Tommy prompted a change in track list. Only one song from the Bangers mixtape, "Mistakes", made it onto the album.

The group announced via Facebook and Twitter that a song recorded by the new lineup, called "Savages", would be released soon. In January 2014, the band began releasing studio updates for what fans should expect from the album. The group embarked on the "We Are Savages Tour" in 2014 with supporting acts from Mod Sun, Jonny Craig, Ghost Town, Lionfight and Divided By Friday. The group also performed at the 2014 Warped Tour event. In October and November 2014, they co-headlined a tour with Candyland called "The Friend Zone Tour".

== Composition ==
The album has been described as electropop and emo-pop. David Schmitt spoke about the concept of the album:

Savages isn't a bad thing, it's just about how you live your life and chasing your dreams, I want people to get out of this record that they feel like they are a part of the band when they are done listening to it... It's very futuristic what we are doing for this record. It's a lot of new sounds that we have never done that we haven't heard at all.

And about the sound: "It's super electronic and [filled with] EDM."

Breathe Carolina has hinted that Savages will be a mixture of their musical roots and a new electronic sound, different from all three of their previous full-length albums.

== Release ==
The lead single of the album with the same name was streamed via Fearless's official SoundCloud account and made available for digital download on November 25, 2013. A lyric video for the song was released the following week in Fearless's official YouTube account. On February 18, 2014, the official second single "Sellouts" featuring Danny Worsnop from the band Asking Alexandria was released along with its music video. The third single "Bang It Out", which features Karmin, was streamed and released on March 18, 2014. Another featuring track with Tyler Carter from the metalcore band Issues called "Chasing Hearts" was also streamed on April 7 and its music video was premiered by Billboard on April 15, 2014. A live music video from the song "Collide" was released on April 21, 2014. "Bang It Out" was sent to US dance radio on July 1, 2014 by Fearless Records. "I Don't Know What I'm Doing" followed the next week. A reboot version of the song with Oscar Olivo was released on October 17, 2014 along with its music video. On October 29, 2014, the group premiered a music video for "Shadows" via PopCrush.

== Critical reception ==
Professional ratings
Review scores
Source	Rating
AllMusic	3/5 stars
Alternative Press	3.5/5 stars
The Music	1/5 stars
USA Today	2.5/4 stars

The album generally received positive reviews. At Alternative Press, Dan Leroy rated the album three-and-a-half stars out of four, saying that "if you are looking for largely a guiltless guilty pleasure for the summer of 2014, you're in the right place". Elysa Gardner of USA Today rated the album two-and-a-half stars out of four, writing that "Breathe Carolina's sound is processed and pumped-up", however "some of the band's strongest grooves to date and canny atmospheric (and acoustic) touches make a number of tracks diverting". Tim Sendra from AllMusic rated the album with three stars out of five and noted the genre shift, praising the tracks "Bang It Out", "Collide", "Shadows" and "Bury Me"; describing it as an "emo-pop album that delivers plenty of frothy fun" if you pick the songs that work. The Music wrote a negative review on the album, remarking, "unfortunately the album is an overall lackluster and doesn't provide anything inventive. Another big swing and a miss from a band that has rarely made any contact in the past."

== Track listing ==
No.	Title	Writer(s)	Length
1.	"Bury Me"	David Schmitt; Ian Kirkpatrick; Eric Armenta; Tommy Cooperman; Luis Bonet	3:51
2.	"Bang It Out" (featuring Karmin)	Schmitt; Kyle Even; Luis Bonet; Eric Armenta; Joshua Aragon; Kirkpatrick; Lindy Robbins	4:12
3.	"Sellouts" (featuring Danny Worsnop)	Schmitt; Even; Kirkpatrick; Armenta; Cooperman; Bonet; Danny Worsnop	4:48
4.	"Shots Fired"	Schmitt; Kirkpatrick; Armenta; Cooperman; Bonet; Simon Wilcox	4:19
5.	"Collide"	Schmitt; Kirkpatrick; Armenta; Cooperman; Bonet; Andrew Goldstein	3:44
6.	"Please Don't Say"	Schmitt; Even; Kirkpatrick; Armenta; Cooperman; Bone; Justin Tranter	3:52
7.	"Shadows"	Schmitt; Kirkpatrick; Armenta; Cooperman; Bonet; Wilcox	4:16
8.	"Savages"	Schmitt; Even; Kirkpatrick; Armenta; Cooperman; Bonet	3:21
9.	"Chasing Hearts" (featuring Tyler Carter)	Schmitt; Kirkpatrick; Armenta; Cooperman; Bonet; Tyler Carter	3:57
10.	"I Don't Know What I'm Doing"	Schmitt; Kirkpatrick; Armenta; Cooperman; Bonet; Goldstein	4:26
11.	"Mistakes"	Schmitt; Kirkpatrick; Armenta; Cooperman; Bonet; Tranter	4:05
Total length:			44:51

== Personnel ==
Credits for Savages adapted from AllMusic.

Breathe Carolina

- Eric Armenta – drums, percussion
- Luis Bonet – keyboards
- Tommy Cooperman – guitar, programming, keyboards, synthesizer, bass
- David Schmitt – clean vocals, synthesizers, keyboards, programming, guitar, drums, percussions

Additional musicians

- Tyler Carter – featured artist
- Karmin – featured artist
- Danny Worsnop – featured artist

Production

- Brad Blackwood – mastering
- Mike Farrell – layout
- Chris Foitle – A&R
- Ian Kirkpatrick – engineer, mixing, producer
- Zeb Love – cover editing, photo editing
- Jenny Reader – product manager
- Sal Torres – A&R
- Jonathan Weiner – photography

== Charts ==
=== Weekly charts ===
Weekly chart performance for Savages
Chart (2014)	Peak position
Australian Hitseekers Albums (ARIA)	9
US Billboard 200	22
US Top Alternative Albums (Billboard)	4
US Top Dance Albums (Billboard)	1
US Independent Albums (Billboard)	3
US Top Rock Albums (Billboard)	5

=== Year-end charts ===
Year-end chart performance for Savages
Chart (2014)	Position
US Top Dance/Electronic Albums (Billboard)	22
