= Hell Is What You Make It =

Studio album by Breathe Carolina
- Released: July 12, 2011
- Recorded: 2010–2011
- Studios: NRG Studios (North Hollywood), The Lair (Los Angeles), Zenseven Studios (Woodland Hills)
- Genres: Electronicore; electropop; trance; post-hardcore
- Length: 47:06
- Label: Fearless
- Producers: Ian Kirkpatrick; Matt Squire

Breathe Carolina chronology
Hello Fascination (2009)	Hell Is What You Make It (2011)	Savages (2014)

Alternative covers
- Hell Is What You Make It: Reloaded cover

Singles from Hell Is What You Make It
- 1. "Blackout" Released: June 14, 2011; 2. "Hit and Run" Released: May 22, 2012

Hell Is What You Make It is the third studio album by electronic rock duo Breathe Carolina. It was released on July 12, 2011, through Fearless Records. Recording for the album took place in Los Angeles, California between 2010-2011 whilst production was handled by Ian Kirkpatrick. Musically, the album is mainly rooted in dance, pop, trance and post-hardcore genres but also uses elements of electronic music and dubstep. The album received generally positive reviews from music critics, who commended its "catchiness" and "radio-friendly" songs. It debuted at number 42 on the Billboard 200, as well as the top 10 of the Dance/Electronic, Rock, Alternative and Independent Albums charts. Promotion of the album was primarily through live concerts and television performances, such as Jimmy Kimmel Live! and The Daily Habit. Its lead single, "Blackout", has since become a commercial success, peaking within the charts in Canada, New Zealand, Scotland, the United Kingdom and United States, while being certified Platinum by the Recording Industry Association of America (RIAA) for selling more than 1 million copies. A deluxe edition titled Hell Is What You Make It: RELOADED was scheduled to be released on July 10, 2012, including two new original tracks, one remix, and a new version of "Last Night (Vegas)". It is their final release with founding member Kyle Even.

== Background and recording ==
On December 22, 2010, Fearless Records posted a video featuring a 30-second preview of the track "Blackout". Recording took place in Los Angeles, California in early 2011. Recorded at NRG Studios, The Lair and Zenseven Studios, it is the first album in which Breathe Carolina recorded as a full band. It was officially announced on April 28, 2011, when the band launched a website to promote the album. The website contained a video featuring a forty-second preview of the track "Wooly" whilst displaying the album's title and release date in flash animation. On May 15, 2011, a demo of the track "Sweat It Out" was temporarily posted on YouTube before being shortly taken down. On May 19, the promotional website was updated, containing the album's cover art and track listing.

The album is a slight departure from the band's earlier sound presented on their first two albums, focusing less on scream vocals and more emphasis on clean vocals. It is described as dance, pop, trance and post-hardcore, blending elements of electronic music and dubstep. The album's songs are also described as "radio friendly" and a result, some labelled the duo as "selling out." In response, Kyle Even said, "We didn't really do that for the radio. We just wrote a song that they play on the radio. If people didn't want to hear it, it wouldn't be where it's at." In December 2011, the duo signed with Columbia Records. They spent ten days in California, in January 2012, to write and record new material for a deluxe edition of the album. Kyle Even also confirmed that a new single would be released off the deluxe edition.

In an interview with Alternative Press, Kyle Even explained each song track by track. He described the opening track "Rebirth: An Introduction", as one that "comes full circle at the end of the album," having the same refrain from the album's last track "Lauren's Song". "Wooly" is a song about trying to save someone, but understanding that only they can save themselves. "Edge of Heaven" was the last song completed for the album and references the seven deadly sins. Songs such as "Blackout", "Sweat It Out" and "Last Night (Vegas)" are party tracks. According to Even, "Gone So Long" is a message to their families and friends, about being on the road and realizing "how much home means to us." The album's closing track, "Lauren's Song" is a tribute to their friend who died.

== Release and promotion ==
A preview of Hell Is What You Make It was streamed on June 17, 2011. The album was released on July 12, 2011, through Fearless Records. The duo participated in the 2011 Scream It Like You Mean It Tour to promote the album. The group embarked on a co-headlining tour called the Blackout Forever Tour in early 2012, with the Ready Set. Breathe Carolina also performed at the 2012 Warped Tour that summer.

Prior to the album's release, "Wooly" and "Sweat It Out" were available for streaming on the duo's official social networking sites. A deluxe edition of the album titled, Hell Is What You Make It: RELOADED was released on July 10, 2012, featuring the single "Hit and Run", a remix version of the song and "Reaching for the Floor".

== Singles ==
The album's lead single, "Blackout", was available for streaming via MTV Buzzworthy on June 13, 2011, and was released for digital download the following day. It has since become the duo's most commercially successful single to date, charting within Canada, New Zealand, Scotland, the United Kingdom and United States, while also being certified Platinum by the Recording Industry Association of America (RIAA) for selling more than 1,000,000 copies. It has also received generally favorable reviews from music critics, with Alternative Press calling it an "irresistible synth-pop song". A lyric video was uploaded onto the duo's official YouTube account on June 24. An accompanying music video was released onto the duo's official Vevo page on YouTube on September 20, and has since garnered more than 1 million views. The video features shots of the duo partying and getting into trouble, as well as performing the song at a live event. It was shot during summer 2011 in Los Angeles, California. The duo also performed the song live on Jimmy Kimmel Live! in their first televised performance ever. An extended play titled Blackout: The Remixes EP was released on September 27 via iTunes. "Hit and Run" exclusively premiered via Alternative Press on May 21, 2012, while being available for digital download the following day. It is featured on the deluxe edition of the album.

== Critical reception ==
Professional ratings
Review scores
Source	Rating
AllMusic	3.5/5 stars
Alternative Press	3.5/5 stars
Alter the Press!	3/5 stars
The Music	3/5 stars

The album has received generally positive reviews from music critics. Tim Sendra of AllMusic gave a positive review, scoring the album 3 and a half stars out of 5, saying, "Hell Is What You Make It finds the duo of Kyle Even and David Schmitt refining their amalgamation of sounds into something both slicker and more powerful than past efforts". The album's singles, "Blackout", "Last Night (Vegas)", and "Take It Back" were indicated as the AMG Track Picks. Alternative Press also gave a positive review, scoring the album 3 and a half stars out of 5, saying, "The band—and producer Ian Kirkpatrick—bring a lot of dishes to this sonic buffet—and most of them are to be consumed on the dancefloor". While praising "Blackout", an "irresistible synth-pop song", "Wooly", the opening track "where house-techno sequencers and melodic vocals parry with screamo-metal breakdowns and growling", and "Waiting", "the head-nod initiator" that "would sound sweet bumping at a hipster club at 4 a.m," they criticized the tracks "Last Night (Vegas)", "Take It Back", and "Chemicals", calling them a "smack of blatant careerism". A staff writer from The Music stated the album "is a mixed bag of tracks [...] It was only a matter of time before the band's two distinct musical styles came to a head, pulling the band's sound more in one direction than the other, losing the balance they had seemed to find with their previous releases. However, it cannot be said that this album isn't catchy, because it definitely is." Jon Caramanica of The New York Times called the album, "one of the year's best pure pop albums." He stated, "Rivulets of teen pop, pop-punk, screamo and club music all feed these songs, which are propulsive and cheerful even when the subject matter is grim."

In December 2011, Hell Is What You Make It earned them a nomination for Favorite Breakthrough Band by MTV.

== Commercial performance ==
It debuted and peaked at number 42 on the Billboard 200, only one number higher than their previous album, Hello Fascination. It also charted on the Billboard Top Rock Albums at number ten, Top Alternative Albums at number eight, Top Dance/Electronic Albums at number two and Independent Albums at number nine. As of March 2014, the album has sold 64,000 copies in the United States.

== Track listing ==
All songs produced by Ian Kirkpatrick except "Chemicals", produced by Matt Squire.

Standard edition
No.	Title	Writer(s)	Length
1.	"Rebirth: An Introduction"	David Schmitt; Kyle Even; Eric Armenta; Joshua Aragon; Luis Bonet; Ian Kirkpatrick	0:59
2.	"Wooly"	Schmitt; Even; Armenta; Aragon; Bonet; Kirkpatrick	3:53
3.	"Blackout"	Schmitt; Even; Armenta; Aragon; Bonet; Kirkpatrick; Simon Wilcox	3:28
4.	"Edge of Heaven"	Schmitt; Even; Kirkpatrick; Daniel R. Monahan; Augie Schmidt	3:39
5.	"Last Night (Vegas)"	Schmitt; Even; Armenta; Aragon; Bonet; Kirkpatrick; David L. Quinones	3:34
6.	"Sweat It Out"	Schmitt; Even; Armenta; Aragon; Bonet; Kirkpatrick	3:50
7.	"Gone So Long"	Schmitt; Even; Armenta; Aragon; Bonet; Kirkpatrick	4:07
8.	"They Say You Won't Come Back"	Schmitt; Even; Armenta; Aragon; Bonet; Kirkpatrick	4:15
9.	"Get Off Easy"	Schmitt; Even; Armenta; Aragon; Bonet; Kirkpatrick; Wilcox	3:45
10.	"Waiting"	Schmitt; Even; Armenta; Aragon; Bonet; Kirkpatrick; Quinones	4:24
11.	"Take It Back"	Schmitt; Even; Armenta; Aragon; Bonet; Kirkpatrick	3:29
12.	"Chemicals"	Schmitt; Even; Matt Squire	3:31
13.	"Lauren's Song"	Schmitt; Even; Armenta; Aragon; Bonet; Kirkpatrick	4:10
Total length:			47:06

Reloaded
No.	Title	Writer(s)	Length
14.	"Hit and Run"	Schmitt; Even; Armenta; Aragon; Bonet; Kirkpatrick; Lindy Robbins	3:12
15.	"Reaching for the Floor"	Schmitt; Even; Kirkpatrick	3:30
16.	"Hit and Run" (Wideboys remix)	Schmitt; Even; Armenta; Aragon; Bonet; Kirkpatrick; Robbins	3:31
Total length:			57:14

== Personnel ==
Breathe Carolina

- Kyle Even – unclean vocals, clean vocals
- David Schmitt – clean vocals, keyboards, guitars, bass, drums

Additional musicians

- Eric Armenta – drums, percussion
- Joshua Aragon – keyboards, guitars, background vocals
- Luis Bonet – keyboards

Production

- Matt Squire – production, engineering, mixing
- Ian Kirkpatrick – programming, production, engineering, mixing
- Carlos De Garza – drum engineering
- Sol Amstutz – artwork
- Shervon Esfahani – A&R
- Chris Foitle – A&R

== Charts ==
Chart performance for Hell Is What You Make It
Chart (2011)	Peak position
US Billboard 200	42
US Top Alternative Albums (Billboard)	8
US Top Dance Albums (Billboard)	2
US Independent Albums (Billboard)	9
US Top Rock Albums (Billboard)	10
