= Sleepless (EP) =

EP by Breathe Carolina
- Released: September 16, 2016
- Genre: EDM
- Length: 32:31
- Label: Spinnin'
- Producer: Breathe Carolina; Crossnaders; Jay Cosmic; Outwild; Reez; Riggi & Piros; Ryos

Breathe Carolina chronology
| Ruins: The Thank You (2016) | Sleepless (2016) | Oh So Hard (2016) |

Singles from Sleepless
- 1. "More Than Ever" Released: November 20, 2015; 2. "See the Sky" Released: July 22, 2016; 3. "Stable" Released: August 26, 2016

Sleepless is the sixth extended play recorded by American electronic music duo Breathe Carolina. It was released on September 16, 2016 through Spinnin' Records. The EP debuted at No. 4 on the Dance/Electronic Albums chart selling 2,000 copies first week.

== Background and composition ==
Sleepless showcases the group with a new direction of their sound with some roots of their early "emo" sounding vocals according to member David Schmitt. Speaking about the process of putting the EP together, Schmitt said, "the process was a bit different as we worked with so many different artist. In the dance world it’s special because collaborating and sharing ideas isn’t as rare as say a 'rock or warped' type of world so it was different and a lot of fun." The EP features a melodically driven sound, taking advantage of current dance music trends to deliver mainstream friendly productions.

== Singles ==
"More Than Ever" was released as the first single from the EP on November 20, 2015. The duo collaborated with Ryos on the song. "See the Sky" was released as the second single from the EP on July 22, 2016. "Stable" was released on August 26, 2016 as the third single.

== Track listing ==
Standard edition
| No. | Title | Length |
|---|---|---|
| 1. | "Nights" | 3:59 |
| 2. | "Stable" | 3:50 |
| 3. | "See the Sky" | 3:24 |
| 4. | "Vanish" | 3:44 |
| 5. | "Stay" | 3:23 |
| 6. | "Getaway Car" | 2:46 |
| 7. | "More Than Ever" | 3:43 |
| 8. | "Sleepless" | 3:22 |
| Total length: | | 32:31 |

Japanese edition
| No. | Title | Length |
|---|---|---|
| 7. | "More Than Ever" (Club Mix) | 4:20 |
| 8. | "Sleepless" | 3:22 |
| 9. | "More Than Ever" | 3:43 |

== Personnel ==
Credits for Sleepless adapted from AllMusic.

Breathe Carolina

- Tommy Cooperman – composer, producer
- Luis Bonet – composer
- David Schmitt – composer, producer

Production

- Kyle F. Anderson – producer
- Dan Book – composer
- Jamie Corbishley – producer
- Siem Henskens – producer
- Kara Madden – composer
- Renze Michels – producer
- Shane Muller – producer
- James Piros – producer
- Anthony Riggi – producer
- Elizabeth Russo – composer
- Ryos – producer
- Brandon Sammons – composer
- Bob Sandee – producer
- Matthew Steeper – composer
- Sophie Stern – producer
- Kelly Melissa Sweet – composer
- Phillip Wessels – producer

== Charts ==
Chart performance for Sleepless
| Chart (2016) | Peak position |
|---|---|
| US Top Dance/Electronic Albums (Billboard) | 4 |
| US Independent Albums (Billboard) | 36 |

== Release history ==
Release history for Sleepless
| Region | Date | Format | Label | Ref. |
|---|---|---|---|---|
| Various | September 16, 2016 | Digital download | Spinnin' | |
| Japan | October 19, 2016 | Digital download | Spinnin' | |
