= Blackout (Breathe Carolina song) =

2011 single by Breathe Carolina

Single by Breathe Carolina

from the album Hell Is What You Make It
- B-side: "Sweat It Out"
- Released: June 14, 2011
- Recorded: 2010
- Genre: Synthpop; dance-pop
- Length: 3:30
- Label: Columbia; Fearless
- Songwriters: David Schmitt; Kyle Even; Luis Bonet; Joshua Aragon; Eric Armenta; Ian Kirkpatrick; Simon Wilcox
- Producer: Ian Kirkpatrick

Breathe Carolina singles chronology
"Down" (2010)	"Blackout" (2011)	"Hit and Run" (2012)

Music video
- "Blackout" on YouTube

"Blackout" is a song by American electronic rock duo Breathe Carolina. It is the lead single from their third studio album Hell Is What You Make It. It was written by David Schmitt, Kyle Even, Eric Armenta, Joshua Aragon, and Luis Bonet, whilst production was handled by Ian Kirkpatrick. Recorded between late 2010 and early 2011, it was one of the first tracks recorded for the album. On December 22, 2010, a snippet of the song was previewed in a YouTube video by Fearless Records. It premiered via MTV Buzzworthy on June 13, 2011, while it was available for digital download the following day.

The song received generally positive reviews from music critics, with some commending its catchiness. The song has since become the duo's most successful single to date, peaking within the charts of Canada, New Zealand, Scotland, the United Kingdom and United States. It was also certified platinum by the Recording Industry Association of America (RIAA), selling more than 1 million copies. A music video directed by MOTIONarmy premiered via Vevo on September 20, 2011. A remix EP titled Blackout: The Remixes EP was also released on September 27, 2011, featuring remixes done by Big Chocolate, Wideboys, Tommy Noble and Tek-One. The song has since been performed on Jimmy Kimmel Live! as well as The Daily Habit.

== Background and composition ==
The song was written by David Schmitt, Kyle Even, Eric Armenta, Joshua Aragon, Luis Bonet, and Simon Wilcox while production was handled by Ian Kirkpatrick, and was the first song written for the album. While describing the writing process of the song, Even said the song is "one song that we created. We're very eclectic, and we definitely do whatever we want." It was recorded in Los Angeles, California in 2010. On December 22, 2010, a snippet of the song was previewed by Fearless Records, however, the name of the song was not given. It premiered via MTV Buzzworthy on June 13, 2011, while being available for digital download the following day.

Musically, "Blackout" is a synthpop and dance-pop song that also blends house, Italo disco and electro genres and features a "chugging bassline" and "punchy beats", while Schmitt's vocals have been described as "nasal". The song has also been said to be reminiscent of pop music from the late-1980s. It has also been described as having heavy influences of pop punk, and has been compared to the music of Cobra Starship. Lyrically, the song mentions references to alcohol intoxication and partying, singing "I'm only getting started/I won't blackout" throughout the chorus.

The song earned the duo, MTV Push Artist of the Week on November 7, 2011.

== Critical reception ==
"Blackout" received generally positive reviews from music critics. Jason Newman of MTV called the track, "anthemic" stating, "The heavily effected vocals mask the motivational hook, which is perfectly suited to a night out." Alternative Press called the tune, "an irresistible synth-pop song." Lewis Corner of Digital Spy compared the song to Kesha and You Me at Six stating, "The cut is a rebellious combo of '80s power synths and rock-ready beats."

== Music video ==
The music video for the song premiered on September 20, 2011 on the duo's official VEVO channel via YouTube. The music video garnered over 850,000 views within the first five days of its release. It was shot during the summer of 2011 in Los Angeles, California. It includes shots of the duo performing live with their band whilst also including sequences of the group "partying" and "getting into trouble". It has since ranked on MTV's 10 On Top list.

A lyric video was also uploaded onto the duo's official YouTube channel and has since garnered more than 16 million views.

== Commercial performance ==
"Blackout" debuted on the Billboard Hot 100 on November 19, 2011 at number 92. The song later peaked at number 32 on the Billboard Hot 100. The song sold 175,000 digital downloads in December 2011. On the week of January 8, 2012, "Blackout" saw its highest sales week yet with over 75,000 copies sold. As of January 2012, the song has sold over 400,000 copies in the US. Outside of the United States, the song also charted in Canada, New Zealand and Scotland. In the UK, the song peaked at number 21 on the UK Singles Chart and number 1 on the UK Independent Singles Chart.

== Live performances ==
The duo performed "Blackout" on Jimmy Kimmel Live! on June 16, 2011 in their first televised performance ever. The duo also performed it on The Daily Habit.

== Other media ==
The song was played during the 2011 WWE Slammy Awards.

== Track listing ==
Digital download

1. "Blackout" - 3:30

CD single

1. "Blackout" - 3:32
2. "Sweat It Out" - 3:53

Maxi CD single

1. "Blackout" - 3:28
2. "Blackout (Wideboys Remix)" – 6:17

Blackout: The Remixes EP

1. "Blackout (Wideboys Remix)" – 6:17
2. "Blackout (Tommy Noble Remix)" – 4:08
3. "Blackout (Big Chocolate Remix)" – 5:06
4. "Blackout (Tek-One Remix)" - 3:46

== Charts ==
=== Weekly charts ===
Weekly chart performance for "Blackout"
Chart (2011–12)	Peak position
Austria (Ö3 Austria Top 40)	66
Canada Hot 100 (Billboard)	94
Canada CHR/Top 40 (Billboard)	39
Canada Hot AC (Billboard)	50
Germany (GfK)	76
Latvia (European Hit Radio)	10
New Zealand (Recorded Music NZ)	32
Scotland Singles (Official Charts)	20
Slovakia Airplay (ČNS IFPI)	56
UK Dance (Official Charts)	3
UK Indie (Official Charts)	1
UK Singles (Official Charts)	21
US Billboard Hot 100	32
US Adult Pop Airplay (Billboard)	39
US Dance Club Songs (Billboard)	25
US Pop Airplay (Billboard)	17
US Rock Digital Song Sales (Billboard)	4

=== Year-end charts ===
Year-end chart performance for "Blackout"
Chart (2012)	Position
Latvia (European Hit Radio)	48
US Alternative Digital Song Sales (Billboard)	19
US Rock Digital Song Sales (Billboard)	24

== Certifications ==
Certifications for "Blackout"
Region	Certification	Certified units/sales
United States (RIAA)	Platinum	1,000,000^{^}
^{^} Shipments figures based on certification alone.

== Release history ==
Release history for "Blackout"
Region	Date	Format	Version	Label	Ref.
United States	June 14, 2011	Digital download	Main	Fearless	
Various	September 27, 2011	Digital download	Remixes	Fearless	
Australia	January 27, 2012	Digital download	Main	Fearless	
New Zealand	January 27, 2012	Digital download	Main	Fearless	
United Kingdom	April 1, 2012	Contemporary hit radio	Main	Fearless	

== See also ==
- List of UK Independent Singles Chart number ones of 2012
