= Dead: The Album =

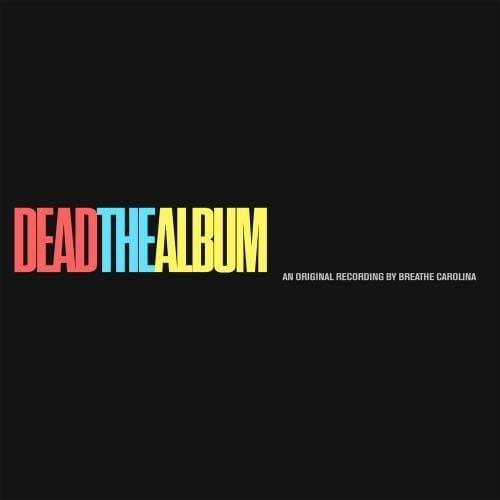

Studio album by Breathe Carolina
- Released: November 15, 2019
- Recorded: 2019
- Genre: Dance-pop; EDM; electropop
- Length: 28:20
- Label: Spinnin'; Big Beat
- Producer: Alberto Gelati; Andrea Bussoletti; Andrew Goldstein; David Schmitt; Jack Brady; Jordan Roman; Luigi Bordi; Tommy Cooperman

Breathe Carolina chronology
Savages (2014)	Dead: The Album (2019)

Singles from DEADTHEALBUM
- 1. "Too Good" Released: September 13, 2019; 2. "Like This" Released: September 20, 2019; 3. "Drive" Released: November 8, 2019; 4. "July" Released: November 14, 2019

Dead: The Album (stylized as DEADTHEALBUM) is the fifth studio album by American electronic music group Breathe Carolina. Released on November 15, 2019, on Spinnin' Records and Big Beat, it serves as a follow-up to the group's fourth studio album, Savages (2014). It is their first studio album released as a duo and also their first to be released since their departure from Fearless Records. The album has been described as EDM, including elements of pop and R&B. The album debuted at No. 6 on the Billboard Dance Album Sales chart.

== Background ==
Inspiration behind Breathe Carolina releasing their next studio album came about from the completion of the album's first single, "Too Good". "It ignited a spark in us," producer and member Tom Cooperman says, "the energy we both felt with this record was undeniable and there was this palpable enthusiasm in the studio. We very quickly came to the decision that we needed to make an entire album that had the feeling and mood of this first song." Singer and producer David Schmitt added, "it felt like a breath of fresh air and a vibe we haven’t heard come from anyone." Musically, the album is a blend of electro-pop, EDM and pop punk.

== Promotion ==
On September 13, 2019, Breathe Carolina released the album's lead single, "Too Good". The song amassed nearly 2 million streams since its release. The second single "Like This" was released on September 20. "Drive" followed on November 8 as the third single. One day before the album came out, on November 14, the track "July" was released as a single along with its music video.

The duo embarked on a headlining tour called, Dead: The Tour. They also released an acoustic EP, Dead: The Acoustic and a remix album, Dead: The Remixes.

== Track listing ==
No.	Title	Writer(s)	Producer	Length
1.	"Too Good"	Tommy Cooperman; David Schmitt; Andrea Bussoletti; Alberto Gelati; Luigi Bordi; Jack Brady; Jordan Roman	Breathe Carolina; Bussoletti; Gelati; Bordi; Brady; Roman	2:12
2.	"Like This"	Cooperman; Schmitt; Bussoletti; Gelati; Bordi; Brady; Roman	Breathe Carolina; Bussoletti; Gelati; Bordi; Brady; Roman	2:35
3.	"July"	Cooperman; Schmitt; Bussoletti; Gelati; Bordi; Brady; Roman; Andrew Goldstein	Breathe Carolina; Bussoletti; Gelati; Bordi; Brady; Roman; Goldstein	3:15
4.	"Better"	Cooperman; Schmitt; Bussoletti; Gelati; Bordi; Brady; Roman	Breathe Carolina; Bussoletti; Gelati; Bordi; Brady; Roman	3:16
5.	"Interlude"	Cooperman; Schmitt; Bussoletti; Gelati; Bordi; Brady; Roman	Breathe Carolina; Bussoletti; Gelati; Bordi	1:51
6.	"Drive"	Cooperman; Schmitt; Bussoletti; Gelati; Bordi; Brady; Roman	Breathe Carolina; Bussoletti; Gelati; Bordi; Brady; Roman	3:29
7.	"In The Dark"	Cooperman; Schmitt; Bussoletti; Jordan Witzigreuter; Gelati; Bordi	Breathe Carolina; Bussoletti; Gelati; Bordi	2:43
8.	"Dead"	Cooperman; Schmitt; Bussoletti; Gelati; Bordi; Brady; Roman	Breathe Carolina; Bussoletti; Gelati; Bordi; Brady; Roman	3:29
9.	"Find It"	Cooperman; Schmitt; Bussoletti; Gelati; Bordi; Brady; Roman	Breathe Carolina; Bussoletti; Gelati; Bordi; Brady; Roman	2:26
10.	"Think About You"	Cooperman; Schmitt; Bussoletti; Gelati; Bordi; Brady; Roman	Breathe Carolina; Bussoletti; Gelati; Bordi; Brady; Roman	3:05
Total length:				28:20

== Personnel ==
Credits for Dead: The Album adapted from AllMusic.

Breathe Carolina

- Tom "Tommy" Cooperman – programming, producer, composer, vocals, keyboards, synthesizers, percussion
- David Schmitt – lead vocals, programming, producer, composer, keyboards, synthesizers, percussion

Production

- Alberto Gelati, Andrea Bussoletti, David Schmitt, Jack Brady, Jordan Roman, Luigi Bordi, Tom Cooperman, Andrew Goldstein – producers
- Jordan Witzigreuter – co-writer ("In the Dark")

== Charts ==
Chart performance for Dead: The Album
Chart (2019)	Peak position
US Dance/Electronic Album Sales (Billboard)	6
