= Chasing Hearts =

Single by Breathe Carolina featuring Tyler Carter

from the album Savages
- Released: April 15, 2014
- Recorded: 2013
- Genre: Electropop
- Length: 3:57
- Label: Fearless
- Songwriters: David Schmitt; Ian Kirkpatrick; Eric Armenta; Tommy Cooperman; Luis Bonet; Tyler Carter
- Producer: Ian Kirkpatrick

Breathe Carolina singles chronology
"Bang It Out" (2014)	"Chasing Hearts" (2014)	"Collide" (2014)

Tyler Carter singles chronology
"Never Lose Your Flames" (2014)	"Chasing Hearts" (2014)

"Chasing Hearts" is a song by American electronic rock group Breathe Carolina, featuring vocals from Tyler Carter of the metalcore band Issues. It was released as the fourth single from Breathe Carolina's fourth studio album Savages, on April 15, 2014, via Fearless Records. Written by the band, it features Carter as a guest vocalist, and was produced by Ian Kirkpatrick. The music video for this song premiered on Billboard on April 15, 2014, and was directed by Jade Elher.

== Background ==
In January 2014, it was announced that Breathe Carolina's fourth studio album Savages would be released in April, featuring guest vocals from multiple artists, including Tyler Carter. It was later revealed that Carter would be featured on the song "Chasing Hearts". The song premiered exclusively via Alternative Press on April 7, 2014. Speaking about the song, David Schmitt stated, "Hooligans meets the romantics. We just wanted to make a song that everyone relates to." He also added, "This isn't a new band, but it is a new sound. I grew up listening to electronic music, and I wanted to embrace that influence wholeheartedly this time around."

== Composition ==
"Chasing Hearts" was written by David Schmitt, Ian Kirkpatrick, Eric Armenta, Tommy Cooperman, Luis Bonet and Tyler Carter, while production was handled by Ian Kirkpatrick. It has been described as an electropop track, with electronic and R&B influences. Tim Sendra of AllMusic said the song has Drake's "styled hip-hop."

== Music video ==
Billboard premiered the music video on April 15, 2014. Directed by Jade Elher, the video features Breathe Carolina venturing out to an abandoned part of town in the California desert. It's a mixture of filming from Elher and footage caught from hand-held Go Pro cameras.

== Personnel ==
Credits for "Chasing Hearts" adapted from the album's liner notes.

Breathe Carolina

- Eric Armenta – drums, percussion
- Luis Bonet – keyboards
- Tommy Cooperman – guitar, programming, keyboards, synthesizer, bass
- David Schmitt – clean vocals, synthesizers, keyboards, programming, guitar, drums, percussions

Additional musicians

- Tyler Carter – featured artist

Production

- Brad Blackwood – mastering
- Ian Kirkpatrick – engineer, mixing, producer

== Release history ==
Release dates and history for "Chasing Hearts"
Region	Date	Format	Label	Ref.
Various	April 15, 2014	Digital download; streaming	Fearless	
