= Parkah & Durzo =

Italian DJ and producer duo

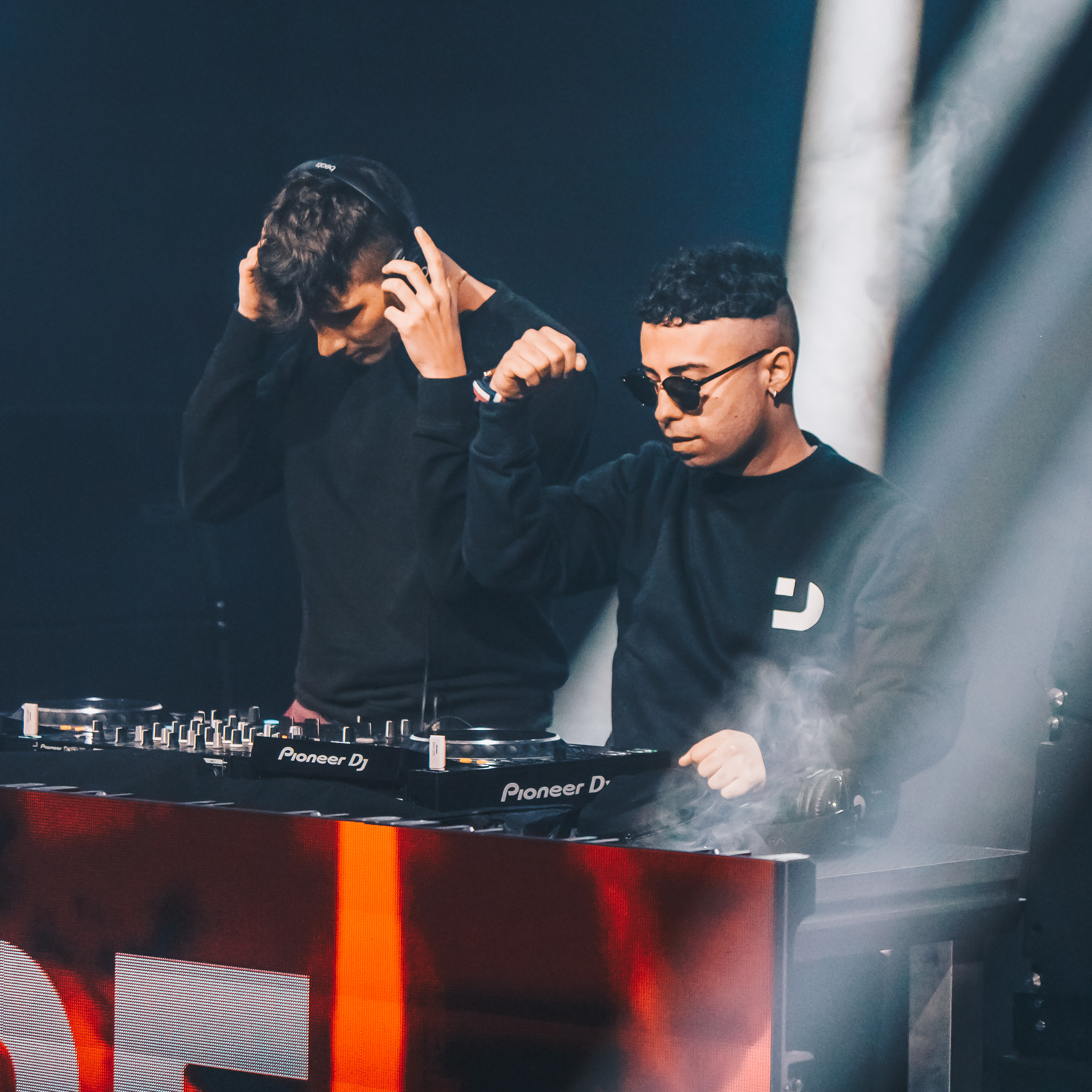
- Parkah (left) and Durzo in 2021

Background information
- Also known as: Parkah, Durzo, R4GE
- Origin: Italy
- Genres: Dance, electro house, dance pop, techno
- Occupations: DJs, producers
- Years active: 2019–present
- Labels: Spinnin' Records, Sony Music, Warner Music Italy, Ultra Records
- Members: Alessandro Grasso, Gabriele D'Urzo
- Website: www.parkahdj.it

Parkah & Durzo are an Italian DJ and record production duo composed of Alessandro Grasso and Gabriele D'Urzo.

== Personal life ==
Known by their stage names, Parkah (Alessandro Grasso) and Durzo (Gabriele D'Urzo) were born in Italy on 8 October 1997 and 25 September 1996, respectively.

== Career ==
In spring 2020, the duo were approached by DJ Matrix to collaborate on "Sono arrivati i caramba," along with DJ Matrix, Matt Joe and Amedeo Preziosi, which was then released on Musica da giostra - Volume 7. Later that year, the duo were contacted by Burak Yeter to officially release the remix of his song "Friday Night." Then, in March 2021, Parkah & Durzo won a Spinnin' Records Talent Pool competition which resulted in an official Amazon Music release of Timmy Trumpet's "Cold" through Spinnin' Records. The duo has performed live at Altromondo Studios and Aquafan.

In 2021 the duo signed a contract with Sony Music Germany to release under the alias of R4GE a track called "Para Paradise" in collaboration with VIZE. In 2024, they collaborated with the 64th artist of the Top100 DJMag, Burak Yeter, on the track "Say My Name" on Ultra Records. The same year, they also collaborated with Gaullin on the track "Last Friday Night".

== Discography ==
Releases
Release year	Title	Featured artists	Release type
2024	Last Friday Night	Gaullin, Parkah & Durzo	Cover
2024	Say My Name	Burak Yeter, Parkah & Durzo	Original
2021	Para Paradise	R4GE, VIZE, & Emie	Original
2021	Payphone	Benlon, Golden Wizards	Cover
2021	Cold (Remix)	Timmy Trumpet, Parkah & Durzo, MET	Remix
2021	Friday Night (Remix)	Burak Yeter, Emie, Lusia Chebotina, & Everthe8	Remix
2020	Squad	Parkah & Durzo, Kris Kiss	Single
2020	Sono arrivati i caramba	Dj Matrix, Amedeo Preziosi, Parkah & Durzo	Single
2020	Fly Away (Remix)	Burak Yeter, Emie, Lusia Chebotina, Everthe8, Rudeejay & Da Brozz	Remix
