= Speechless (Candyland song) =

Single by Candyland featuring RKCB
- Released: 30 October 2015
- Recorded: 2015
- Genre: Future house; deep house
- Length: 3:14
- Label: Seeking Blue
- Songwriter(s): Casey Barth; Christopher James Garrett; Riley Knapp; Josephine Martin
- Producer(s): Candyland

Candyland singles chronology
"Murda" (2015)	"Speechless" (2015)	"Faces" (2016)

RKCB singles chronology
"Daydream" (2015)	"Speechless" (2015)	"Lights Low" (2016)

"Speechless" is a song recorded by American DJ and music producer Candyland. It features Los Angeles based musical duo RKCB.

== Release ==
"Speechless" was released as the fourth single by Candyland, as a solo act on 13 October 2015, exclusively through Spotify. The song was later released for all platforms on 30 October.

The song's cover art was originally designed by Indonesian illustrator Yuschav Arly.

== Music video ==
On 30 October, the official audio for "Speechless" was uploaded onto Mr. Suicide Sheep's YouTube channel. As of October 2016 the video has over 2 million views.

== Track listing ==
Digital download
No.	Title	Length
1.	"Speechless" (featuring RKCB)	3:14
2.	"Speechless" (Instrumental)	3:14

== Charts ==
Chart (2015)	Peak position
US Hot Dance/Electronic Songs (Billboard)	46
