= Hit and Run (Breathe Carolina song) =

Single by Breathe Carolina

from the album Hell Is What You Make It
- Released: May 22, 2012
- Genre: Electronic rock; electropop
- Length: 3:12
- Label: Fearless
- Songwriters: Ian Kirkpatrick; Lindy Robbins; David Schmitt; Kyle Even; Joshua Aragon; Luis Bonet; Eric Armenta
- Producers: Kirkpatrick; Matt Squire

Breathe Carolina singles chronology
"Blackout" (2011)	"Hit and Run" (2012)	"Savages" (2013)

Music video
- "Hit and Run" on YouTube

"Hit and Run" is a song by American electronic music group Breathe Carolina. It was released on May 22, 2012, as the second single from the deluxe edition of their third studio album Hell Is What You Make It: RELOADED. A music video directed by Travis Kopach was released in promotion of the single on June 13, 2012. The song peaked at number 19 on the US Dance/Electronic Digital Song Sales chart.

== Background and composition ==
In December 2011, Breathe Carolia signed with Columbia Records and began preparing to write and record new material in January 2012, for a deluxe edition of Hell Is What You Make It, expected to be released later that year. According to Kyle Even, it was to "help us drive a next single." Even later confirmed the new single titled "Hit and Run", was expected to be released sometime in April.

The band released the cover art for "Hit and Run" on May 16, 2012. They first performed the song live on May 19, 2012. The song premiered on Alternative Press on May 21, 2012, and was released digitally the following day. A lyric video was released that same day. A remix to the song made by Wideboys was included in the reloaded version of Hell Is What You Make It, released in July 2012. Another remix to the song made by Beat Thrillerz was released separately on October 18, 2012, via SoundCloud. The song sold 20,000 digital downloads in its first week.

The song was written by David Schmitt, Kyle Even, Eric Armenta, Joshua Aragon, Luis Bonet, and Lindy Robbins, while production was handled by Ian Kirkpatrick and Matt Squire. Band member Kyle Even said that the song was one of his favorites from the album. Even said that the song is about, "wanting things to stay the same, but wanting them to be different, too."

== Reception ==
MTV's David Greenwald said, "'Hit and Run' goes all T-Pain-meets-Skrillex on us, smoothing out the duo's vocals with auto-tune and adding rave-ready bass to Breathe Carolina's beat arsenal."

== Music video ==
The band released a music video teaser for "Hit and Run" on June 8. It was officially released on June 13, 2012, and was directed by Travis Kopach. Speaking about the music video, Kyle Even said, "The whole idea behind the video was that we live in this black and white world, but there was one girl who knew what color was and she shows us that it's ok to be different. It starts a contagious array and now the whole world is in color."

== Track listing ==
Digital download
No.	Title	Length
1.	"Hit and Run"	3:12

CD single
No.	Title	Length
1.	"Hit and Run"	3:11
2.	"Hit and Run" (Instrumental)	3:11

Remix version
No.	Title	Length
1.	"Hit and Run" (Wideboys Remix)	3:31

== Charts ==
Chart performance for "Hit and Run"
Chart (2012)	Peak position
CIS Airplay (TopHit) Alex Grand and Glazunov Remix	204
Lithuania (EHR)	32
US Dance/Electronic Digital Song Sales (Billboard)	19

== Release history ==
Release dates and formats for "Hit and Run"
Region	Date	Format	Label	Ref.
Various	May 22, 2012	Digital download; streaming	Fearless	
United States	June 5, 2012	Contemporary hit radio	Fearless	
