= Hello Fascination =

Studio album by Breathe Carolina
- Released: August 18, 2009
- Recorded: 2009
- Studios: The Lair (Los Angeles), The Green Room (Los Angeles)
- Genres: Electropop; post-hardcore; electronic rock
- Length: 49:20
- Labels: Fearless; Universal
- Producers: Mike Green; Matt Squire

Breathe Carolina chronology
It's Classy, Not Classic (2008)	Hello Fascination (2009)	Hell Is What You Make It (2011)

Singles from Hello Fascination
- 1. "Hello Fascination" Released: August 2, 2009; 2. "I.D.G.A.F." Released: June 8, 2010

Original artwork
- Original artwork which was later revoked due to copyright

Hello Fascination is the second studio album by electronic rock duo Breathe Carolina. It was released on August 18, 2009, through Fearless Records. It was produced by Mike Green and Matt Squire.

Two singles were released in support of the album: "Hello Fasciation" and "I.D.G.A.F.". The album was met with mixed reviews from music critics and debuted at number 43 on the Billboard 200.

== Background and release ==
After extensively touring in support of their debut album It's Classy, Not Classic (2008), the duo signed with Fearless Records in April 2009. "This is our vision of everything we are – and we are so excited to share this huge piece of ourselves," Kyle Even explains.

Pre-orders for the album were made available on August 8, 2009. The album was released on August 18, 2009. A deluxe edition was released exclusively via iTunes on July 6, 2010, including five bonus tracks, three remixes, and a music video. The duo also streamed the bonus track, "Have You Ever Danced" on their MySpace page the following day. "Hello Fascination" and "The Dressing Room" are available as downloadable content for the iPhone application Tap Tap Revenge. The title track was also used for television promotional use in The Hills and The City.

In support of the album, the band made performances at the 2009 Vans Warped Tour. Breathe Carolina later joined Family Force 5 on their Dance Rawr Dance 3 tour from September to October 2009. The duo also toured in the UK in January 2010. After performing at the 2010 Vans Warped Tour, they embarked on the Fearless Friends tour with Mayday Parade, Every Avenue, Artist Vs Poet and Go Radio in the fall.

== Composition and recording ==
Recorded at The Lair and The Green Room in Los Angeles, it was produced and recorded by Mike Green and Matt Squire. It was recorded around May 2009. For Hello Fascination, the band moved away from just strictly using electronic beats like they did on their debut It's Classy, Not Classic and opted to add real instruments in their music. Musically, the album's sound remains the same as their previous, featuring screamo vocals, electronic/synth beats and blends pop, rock and electronica. The album is classified as crunkcore, electropop and neon pop. Songs such as "Welcome to Savnnah" and "The Dressing Room" were described as "dance-oriented", while "I.D.G.A.F." is described as neon pop-punk. It is also the first album the band recorded with their then-touring drummer, Eric Armenta.

== Singles ==
"Hello Fascination" premiered via the duo's MySpace page on July 24, 2009, before it was released for digital download on August 2, as the first single from the album. A trailer for the accompanying music video was released on January 27. The video was directed by Spence Nicholson and premiered on the duo's official MySpace page on February 3, 2010, whilst premiering on Fearless's YouTube channel on February 8. The song earned an MTV nomination for Best Freshman Video. The album's second single, "I.D.G.A.F.", was available for free download on the duo's Twitter page on June 8, 2010. An accompanying music video was shot in Los Angeles, California and was released on July 28. Directed by Hannah Lux Davis, it is a "confetti-filled" party video. A clean version of the track was released on the deluxe edition of the album. The duo released "Welcome to Savannah" for a free download as a promotional single on June 30, 2009.

A limited vinyl edition of the album was released on February 3, 2010. It was re-pressed in 2026, exclusively via Alternative Press.

== Reception ==
Professional ratings
Review scores
Source	Rating
AllMusic	3.5/5 stars
AbsolutePunk	2.3/10

Tim Sendra of AllMusic gave the album 3 and a half stars out of 5, positively saying the album "won't top any year-end critics polls, but while it is playing, the goofy lyrics, bubblegum snappy melodies, and overall feeling of joyousness will make you feel good. What could be better than that?." However, Drew Beringer of AbsolutePunk gave the album a highly negative review, saying that "Breathe Carolina will sell a lot of copies, so good for them, but that doesn't make this band any less despicable to self-respecting fans of music". Alternative Press said of the album in retrospect, "Breathe Carolina's signing to Fearless in 2009 arrived just in time for their make-or-break sophomore album, Hello Fascination. Luckily for them, the move paid off at the height of the scene craze where the electronic outfit quickly became hot property."

The album debuted at No. 43 on the Billboard 200 and sold 11,000 copies in its first week. The album spent two weeks on the chart. It also peaked at number 43 on the Billboard 200 and spent approximately two weeks on the chart. It also peaked at number eight on the US Top Alternative Albums, number two on the US Top Dance Albums, number 11 on the US Top Rock Albums and number five on the US Independent Albums charts. The album sold over 60,000 copies in the US to date.

== Track listing ==
Standard edition
No.	Title	Writer(s)	Producer	Length
1.	"Hello Fascination"	David Schmitt; Kyle Even; Mike Green; Simon Wilcox	Mike Green	3:21
2.	"I'm the Type of Person to Take It Personal"	Schmitt; Even; Green; Wilcox	Green	4:14
3.	"Take Me to Infinity"	Schmitt; Even; Green; Wilcox	Green	3:35
4.	"Dressed Up to Undress"	Schmitt; Even; Matt Squire	Matt Squire	3:40
5.	"I.D.G.A.F."	Schmitt; Even; Green; Wilcox	Green	3:14
6.	"Welcome to Savannah"	Schmitt; Even; Squire	Squire	3:36
7.	"I Have to Go Return Some Video Tapes"	Schmitt; Even; Green; Wilcox	Green	3:43
8.	"The Dressing Room"	Schmitt; Even; Green	Green	3:28
9.	"Tripped and Fell in Portland"	Schmitt; Even; Green; Wilcox	Green	3:56
10.	"Can I Take You Home?"	Schmitt; Even; Green; Wilcox	Green	3:53
11.	"My Obsession"	Schmitt; Even; Squire	Squire	4:22
12.	"Velvet"	Schmitt; Even; Green; Wilcox; Shawn Harris	Green	3:15
13.	"Rescue"	Schmitt; Even; Green; Harris	Green	4:57
Total length:				49:20

Japanese bonus track
No.	Title	Writer(s)	Producer	Length
14.	"Have You Ever Danced?" (featuring Jeffree Star, Austin Carlile and Dave Strauchman)	Schmitt; Even; Green; Wilcox; Jeffree Star	Green	4:34

Deluxe edition bonus tracks
No.	Title	Writer(s)	Length
14.	"Have You Ever Danced?" (featuring Jeffree Star, Austin Carlile and Dave Strauchman)	Schmitt; Even; Green; Wilcox; Star	4:34
15.	"Don't Forget: Lock the Doors" (Originally appeared on the Gossip EP)	Schmitt; Even	3:51
16.	"I.D.G.A.F." (Radio Edit)	Schmitt; Even; Green; Wilcox	3:14
17.	"Hello Fascination" (Sex Machine Remix)	Schmitt; Even; Green; Wilcox	3:22
18.	"Hello Fascination" (DJ Sucio Remix)	Schmitt; Even; Green; Wilcox	3:22
19.	"Can I Take You Home?" (Smile Future Remix)	Schmitt; Even; Green; Wilcox	5:14
20.	"With or Without You" (U2 cover)	Brian Eno; Daniel Lanois	3:56
21.	"See You Again" (Miley Cyrus cover, originally released on Punk Goes Pop 2)	Destiny Hope Cyrus; Antonina Armato; Tim James	3:23

== Personnel ==
Credits for Hello Fascination adapted from AllMusic.

Breathe Carolina

- Kyle Even – screamed vocals, clean vocals, synthesizers, keyboards, programming, guitar, bass
- David Schmitt – clean vocals, synthesizers, keyboards, programming, guitar, drums, percussions

Additional musicians

- Eric Armenta – drums, percussion

Production

- Matt Squire – production, engineering, mixing
- Mike Green – production, engineering, mixing
- Alan Douches – mastering
- Jason Paul Roberts – photography

== Charts ==
Chart performance for Hello Fascination
Chart (2009)	Peak position
US Billboard 200	43
US Top Alternative Albums (Billboard)	8
US Top Dance Albums (Billboard)	2
US Independent Albums (Billboard)	5
US Top Rock Albums (Billboard)	11
