= Savages (Breathe Carolina song) =

Single by Breathe Carolina

from the album Savages
- Released: November 25, 2013
- Genre: Dance-pop; EDM; electropop
- Length: 3:20
- Label: Fearless
- Songwriters: Ian Kirkpatrick; David Schmitt; Kyle Even; Tommy Cooperman; Luis Bonet; Eric Armenta
- Producer: Kirkpatrick

Breathe Carolina singles chronology
"Hit and Run" (2012)	"Savages" (2013)	"Sellouts" (2014)

Music video
- "Savages" (lyrics video) on YouTube

"Savages" is a song by American electronic music group Breathe Carolina. It was released on November 25, 2013, as the lead single from their fourth studio album Savages. It is the first song released by the band since Kyle Even's departure.

== Composition ==
"Savages" was written by David Schmitt, Kyle Even, Eric Armenta, Tommy Cooperman and Luis Bonet whilst production was handled by Ian Kirkpatrick, who also co-wrote the song. Musically, it is described as dance-pop, EDM and electro-pop. The track incorporates mixes of a house-influenced drop, focusing heavily on the bass, with lyrics about youth and living life to its fullest. The group premiered a lyrics video to the song on November 26, 2013. The track runs at 126 BPM and is in the key of D major. In 2016, the group released a mashup remix to "Savages" for free along with another single "Giants" on Beatport.

== Reception ==
"Savages" was received with mostly positive reviews. Andrew Wendowski of Music Mayhem Magazine gave a positive review calling the song "catchy and fun." He stated, "'Savages', I feel is very balanced vocally and instrumentally; there isn’t too much of one thing. I do like the song lyrically as well." Kriston McConnell of Under the Gun Review gave a mixed review complimenting the song for its "catchy, repetitive chorus," however was critical of the songs creativity. She ended off stating, "it's definitely fun and I certainly look forward to hearing what else they have in store for us, but I do not feel this is the best song they have put out in recent years." A staff writer at The Music magazine wrote that it is "a safe place for EDM lovers." However, criticized the overall execution and called the track "bland and boring."

== Track listing ==
Digital download
No.	Title	Length
1.	"Savages"	3:20

Mashup version
No.	Title	Length
1.	"Savages x Louder" (Breathe Carolina Remix)

== Charts ==
Chart performance for "Savages"
Chart (2013)	Peak position
US Hot Dance/Electronic Songs (Billboard)	47

== Release history ==
Release history for "Savages"
Region	Date	Format	Label	Ref.
Various	November 25, 2013	Digital download; streaming	Fearless	
