= Sanjin =

Sanjin is a given name. Notable people with the name include:

- Sanjin Alagić (born 1977), Bosnian football manager and former player
- Sanjin Bezdrob (born 1979), Bosnian volleyball player
- Sanjin Halimović (born 1969), Bosnian politician
- Sanjin Kalaica (born 1969), Croatian basketball player
- Sanjin Lelić (born 1997), Bosnian-Herzegovinian footballer
- Sanjin Pehlivanović (born 2001), Bosnian pool player
- Sanjin Pintul (born 1970), Bosnia and Herzegovina footballer
- Sanjin Prcić (born 1993), French footballer
- Sanjin Vrebac (born 2000), Austrian footballer

== See also ==
- Watatsumi Sanjin, legendary deity in Japanese mythology
- Sumiyoshi sanjin, generic name for the three deities in Japan
