= Stars & Moon =

Single by Breathe Carolina with Shanahan featuring Haliene
- Released: December 14, 2015
- Genre: Progressive house
- Length: 5:00
- Label: Enhanced Music
- Songwriter(s): Keith Varon; Kelly Sweet; Jake Shanahan; Tommy Cooperman
- Producer(s): Breathe Carolina; Shanahan

Breathe Carolina singles chronology
"Platinum Hearts" (2015)	"Stars & Moon" (2015)	"Ruins" (2016)

"Stars & Moon" is a song by American electronic music group Breathe Carolina and EDM artist Shanahan. The song features American electropop singer Haliene and was released on December 14, 2015 via Enhanced Music.

== Background and composition ==
"Stars & Moon" was written by Keith Varon, Kelly Sweet, Jake Shanahan and Tommy Cooperman while production was handled by Breathe Carolina and Shanahan. The track runs at 128 BPM and is in the key of B major. A remixes EP was released digitally on February 26, 2016.

== Reception ==
Rehan Luthra of We Rave You stated, "this production is bolstered by unmatchable new and creative sounds, glossed with the stellar vocals of Haliene." Brian Bonavoglia of ThisSongSlaps called the track a "euphoric progressive anthem."

The song went on to receive over 5 million streams on Spotify and has received heavy rotation on BPM (Sirius XM) Dance radio. The track went on to be featured in Enhanced Best of 2015, a compilation album released by Enhanced.

== Track listing ==
Digital download
No.	Title	Length
1.	"Stars & Moon"	5:00
2.	"Stars & Moon" (Radio Mix)	3:21

Stars & Moon Remixes
No.	Title	Length
1.	"Stars & Moon" (APEK Remix)	3:24
2.	"Stars & Moon" (Xilent Remix)	3:17
3.	"Stars & Moon" (LTN Remix)	3:20
4.	"Stars & Moon" (Y&V Remix)	3:50

== Charts ==
Chart performance for "Stars & Moon"
Chart (2016)	Peak position
US Dance/Mix Show Airplay (Billboard)	26

== Release history ==
Release history for "Stars & Moon"
Region	Date	Format	Label	Ref.
Various	December 14, 2015	Digital download; streaming	Enhanced	
United States	February 17, 2016	Dance radio	Enhanced	
