= It's Classy, Not Classic =

Studio album by Breathe Carolina
- Released: September 16, 2008
- Genre: Synth-pop; power pop; electronica
- Length: 37:14
- Label: Rise
- Producer: David Schmitt

Breathe Carolina chronology
Gossip (2007)	It's Classy, Not Classic (2008)	Hello Fascination (2009)

Singles from It's Classy, Not Classic
- 1. "Diamonds" Released: February 4, 2009

It's Classy, Not Classic is the debut album by American electronic rock duo Breathe Carolina. It was released on September 16, 2008 through Rise Records. Recorded in 2008 using GarageBand by Apple Inc., lead vocalist David Schmitt also used a MIDI controller and several beat programs to create the tracks. It contains all of the tracks from their EP, Gossip (2007), excluding "Don't Forget: Lock the Door", which was later included on the deluxe edition of their second studio album, Hello Fascination (2009).

== Composition ==
Like the Gossip EP, It's Classy, Not Classic was written, recorded and produced by member David Schmitt at his home in Denver, Colorado using the GarageBand software on his PC. Unlike the group's other records, the album features no traditional instruments such as guitars, instead the music is composed entirely of GarageBand synthesizers and samples.

== Promotion ==
"Diamonds" was released as the lead single from the album on February 4, 2009. A music video directed by Robby Starbuck was released that same day and features guest appearances by the American electropop group Millionaires and Josh White from Umbrella Clothing and This City Is Burning Records. In support of the album, the group went on the Take Action Tour with Cute Is What We Aim For, Meg & Dia, Every Avenue and Anarbor in 2009.

== Reception ==
Professional ratings
Review scores
Source	Rating
Melodic	2/5 stars

It's Classy, Not Classic was met with mixed reviews from music critics. Charity Stafford of AllMusic gave the album a positive review stating, "It's Classy, Not Classic, is a largely synthesized album of sleek electronic pop songs filled with catchy dance beats and an incongruous blend of pitch-altered processed vocals and hectoring screamo howls. The combination works surprisingly well, making It's Classy, Not Classic a unique new take on modern indie rock without falling into the trap of being just a novelty."

Kaj Roth of Melodic gave a negative review criticizing the album for "the domination of drum machines and computer programmed synthesizers" and the lack of real instruments. He also added, "the mix of screamo, techno beats and pop choruses sounds like something that could've been interesting – it's such a shame Breathe Carolina doesn't want to use real drums and guitars."

== Chart performance ==
It's Classy, Not Classic reached number 186 on the Billboard 200, as well as number six on the Billboard Heatseekers Albums chart. As of August 2015, the album has sold 50,000 copies in the US.

== Track listing ==
No.	Title	Length
1.	"The Introduction"	2:29
2.	"No Vacancy"	3:24
3.	"Show Me Yours"	3:50
4.	"The Birds and the Bees"	4:03
5.	"Classified"	3:14
6.	"Gossip"	3:32
7.	"That's Classy"	3:37
8.	"Diamonds"	3:55
9.	"You Wish" (Interlude)	1:33
10.	"Lovely"	3:54
11.	"Put Some Clothes On" (hidden track)	3:50
Total length:		37:14

Japanese bonus track
No.	Title	Length
12.	"Don't Forget: Lock the Door"	3:49
Total length:		41:03

== Personnel ==
Credits for It's Classy, Not Classic adapted from the enclosed album booklet.

Breathe Carolina

- Kyle Even – screamed vocals
- David Schmitt – clean vocals, electronics

Additional musicians

- Alex J. – additional vocals on track 4
- Mandy M – additional vocals on track 4
- Sonny Mazotti – keyboards on track 8

Production

- David Schmitt – recording, mixing, and production
- Kyle Even – co-production
- Kris Crummett – mastering
- Craig Ericson – A&R

== Charts ==
Chart performance for It's Classy, Not Classic
Chart (2008)	Peak position
US Billboard 200	186
US Top Dance Albums (Billboard)	5
US Independent Albums (Billboard)	24
