= Sellouts (song) =

Single by Breathe Carolina

from the album Savages
- Released: February 18, 2014
- Genre: Electronicore; emo; rock
- Length: 4:48
- Label: Fearless
- Songwriters: Ian Kirkpatrick; Danny Worsnop; David Schmitt; Kyle Even; Eric Armenta; Tommy Cooperman; Luis Bonet
- Producer: Kirkpatrick

Breathe Carolina singles chronology
"Savages" (2013)	"Sellouts" (2014)	"Bang It Out" (2014)

Music video
- "Sellouts" on YouTube

"Sellouts" is a song by American electronic music group Breathe Carolina. It was released on February 18, 2014, as the second single from their fourth studio album Savages via Fearless Records. The song features Asking Alexandria vocalist, Danny Worsnop.

== Background and composition ==
"Sellouts" was written by David Schmitt, Kyle Even, Tommy Cooperman, Luis Bonet, Eric Armenta and Danny Worsnop while production was handled by Ian Kirkpatrick, who also co-wrote the song. The track runs at 160 BPM and is in the key of B minor. Featuring guest vocals from Danny Worsnop of Asking Alexandria, the song was available for instant download for fans who pre-ordered the album. Musically, the track is described as electronicore, emo and rock.

The song is about people who criticized the group for "changing their sound" and "selling out." When asked about the song on Twitter, David Schmitt stated, "'Sellouts' is about stupid people with stupid thoughts and zero knowledge."

A dubstep version of the song was featured in their 2015 EP Thank You.

== Reception ==
"Sellouts" was met with generally positive reviews. The Rooster called the song, "a blatant disregard for the proverbial haters in each of the musician's lives and follows a dark and heavy tone through Worsnop's blistering vocals." Music Junkie Press praised the intro for its engaging opening as well as Worsnop's vocal performance. They also stated, "It is a hard driving song to get you pumped up and takes you on a vocal journey." Tim Sendra of AllMusic called it a "very clichéd power emo" track.

== Live performances ==
The group performed "Sellouts" at their Savages release show at the El Rey Theatre in Los Angeles, California with guest vocals from Michael Bohn of Issues. They also performed the song at Warped Tour in 2014 along with The Word Alive singer Telle Smith.

== Music video ==
The music video for "Sellouts" premiered on February 18, 2014 and was directed by Dan Centrone.

== Track listing ==
Digital download
No.	Title	Length
1.	"Sellouts"	4:48

Dubstep remix
No.	Title	Length
1.	"Sellouts" (Dubstep Version)	1:45

== Release history ==
Release history for "Sellouts"
Region	Date	Format	Label	Ref.
Various	February 18, 2014	Digital download; streaming	Fearless	
United Kingdom	June 2, 2014	CD	Fearless	
