= Bang It Out =

Single by Breathe Carolina featuring Karmin

from the album Savages
- Released: March 18, 2014
- Genre: Electropop • electronic rock • dance-pop • electro house
- Length: 4:12
- Label: Fearless
- Songwriters: Ian Kirkpatrick; Lindy Robbins; David Schmitt; Kyle Even; Luis Bonet; Eric Armenta; Joshua Aragon
- Producer: Kirkpatrick

Breathe Carolina singles chronology
"Sellouts" (2014)	"Bang It Out" (2014)	"Chasing Hearts" (2014)

Karmin singles chronology
"I Want It All" (2014)	"Bang It Out" (2014)	"Sugar" (2014)

Music video
- "Bang It Out" on YouTube

"Bang It Out" is a song by American electronic music group Breathe Carolina. The song features American pop duo, Karmin. It was released digitally on March 18, 2014 as the third single from their fourth studio album Savages. "Bang It Out" was sent to US dance radio on July 1, 2014 by Fearless Records.

== Background and composition ==
"Bang It Out" was written by Ian Kirkpatrick, Lindy Robbins, David Schmitt, Kyle Even, Luis Bonet, Eric Armenta and Joshua Aragon while Kirkpatrick also handled the production of the song. The track runs at 130 BPM and is in the key of A-sharp minor. The song was featured in the 2014 film soundtrack Earth to Echo. The group also released several remixes to the song in 2014.

== Music video ==
The band released a teaser video for "Bang It Out" on April 16, 2014. The music video was officially released on May 6 and was directed by Drew Russ. It was filmed in Los Angeles, California. Speaking about the video, Schmitt stated, "This video was my favorite one to film, mainly because we got to hang with some famous dogs. It was a lot of fun, Amy is such a good performer and an awesome friend. We're so excited to have it out!"

== Track listing ==
Digital download
No.	Title	Length
1.	"Bang It Out"	4:12

The Remixes
No.	Title	Length
1.	"Bang It Out" (WAWA's Rich Girl Anthem Mix)	6:28
2.	"Bang It Out" (WAWA's Hot and Numb Club Mix)	6:28
3.	"Bang It Out" (Dirty Pop Remix)	5:36
4.	"Bang It Out" (DJ Dove & Alex Seda Remix)	6:33
5.	"Bang It Out" (CJay Swayne Deep House Mix)	5:58
6.	"Bang It Out" (John Lock Remix)	5:12
7.	"Bang It Out" (Alvar & Millas Remix)	4:57
8.	"Bang It Out" (John J-C Carr Remix)	5:37
9.	"Bang It Out" (Alex Guesta Remix)	5:17

== Charts ==
Chart performance for "Bang It Out"
Chart (2014)	Peak position
US Dance/Electronic Digital Song Sales (Billboard)	44

== Release history ==
Release history for "Bang It Out"
Region	Date	Format	Label	Ref.
Various	March 18, 2014	Digital download; streaming	Fearless	
Australia	April 1, 2014	Dance radio	Fearless	
United States	July 1, 2014	Dance radio	Fearless	
