= Hannah Rose =

- Also known as: Hannah Rose
- Born: Hannah Rose Cox; May 17, 1995 (age 31); Great Falls, Montana
- Origin: Simi Valley, California
- Genres: Pop; Country music; CCM
- Occupations: Singer, songwriter
- Instruments: Vocals, keyboards, guitar
- Years active: 2011- present
- Label: Dream Records 2011-2014
- Website: onehannahrose.com

Hannah Rose Cox (born May 17, 1995), who goes by the stage name Hannah Rose, is an American Pop musician. She released a studio album, Hannah Rose, with Dream Records, in 2013. She won the NashNext competition as a country-music artist. In 2020, Hannah Rose returned to her pop music roots and in 2021 released her first single “Tidal Wave” on all streaming platforms. She has since released five other singles including “Karma”, “Everything”, and “Tears on a Saturday”, which Hannah Rose produced herself.

== Early life ==
Hannah Rose was born on May 17, 1995, as Hannah Rose Cox, in Great Falls, Montana, whose father is a pastor, John Joseph Cox, and mother is Wendy Lee Cox (née, Bonewitz). She grew up in Santa Barbara, California, where she was raised with her two siblings, an older sister, Shaina, and a younger sister, Nikki. She is a 2013 graduate of Grace Brethren High School.

== Music career ==
Her music recording career commenced in 2013, with the studio album, Hannah Rose, released by Dream Records on May 7, 2013, just days before her eighteenth birthday. The album was reviewed by Christian Music Zine, CM Addict, Indie Vision Music, Louder Than the Music, and New Release Tuesday.

== Personal life ==
She currently resides in Simi Valley, California, where she attends worship services at New Hope Christian Fellowship.

== Discography ==
Studio albums

- Hannah Rose (May 7, 2013, DREAM)
