= Faces (Candyland and Shoffy song) =

Single by Candyland & Shoffy

from the album Monstercat 028 – Uproar
- Released: August 5, 2016
- Recorded: 2016
- Genre: Trip hop; R&B; trap; bass house
- Length: 4:00
- Label: Monstercat
- Songwriter(s): Alex Shofler; Josephine Martin
- Producer(s): Candyland

Candyland singles chronology
"Speechless" (2015)	"Faces" (2016)	"Touch Me" (2016)

Shoffy singles chronology
"Villains" (2016)	"Faces" (2016)	"Home" (2016)

"Faces" is a song recorded by American DJ and music producer Candyland and Southern California based singer-songwriter Shoffy.

"Faces" was released as the follow-up to Candyland's prior single, "Speechless," on August 5, 2016.

== Critical reception ==
"Faces" achieved a handful of critical acclaim; and out of that, the song gained generally positive reviews.

In a review Neelu Mohaghegh wrote for Good Music All Day, Mohaghegh complemented Shoffy's "seductive" vocals, as she compared them to that of the famous R&B singer, Miguel. Mohaghegh later on, cleped the song, "a revolutionary chant sprinkled with sexy undertones." Earmilk's Ry Smith also viewed the song positively, as he referred to the song as a "match made in house heaven," and subsequently praised the song's "massive amount of heart and soul".

== Track listing ==
Digital download
No.	Title	Length
1.	"Faces" (with Shoffy)	4:00
