= Breathe Carolina =

American electronic music duo

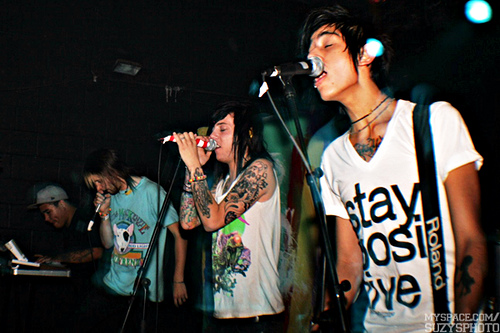
- Breathe Carolina at the Launchpad in Albuquerque, New Mexico, June 2009

Background information
- Origin: Denver, Colorado, U.S.
- Genres: Electronic rock; EDM; electropop; crunkcore; post-hardcore; emo
- Works: Discography
- Years active: 2007–present
- Labels: Armada Music; Columbia; Fearless; Rise; Spinnin'
- Members: David Schmitt; Tommy Cooperman
- Past members: Kyle Even; Joshua Aragon; Luis Bonet; Eric Armenta
- Website: breathecarolinamusic.com

Breathe Carolina is an American electronic music duo from Denver. The duo formed in 2007 consisting of David Schmitt and Kyle Even. They later expanded to a full band whose best-known lineup was Schmitt, Even, drummer Eric Armenta, keytarist Joshua Aragon, and DJ Luis Bonet. In 2013, Even left the group, while Tommy Cooperman joined that year.

Breathe Carolina is composed of Schmitt and Cooperman. The band has released five studio albums: It's Classy, Not Classic (2008), Hello Fascination (2009), Hell Is What You Make It (2011), Savages (2014) and Dead: The Album (2019). Their hit single "Blackout" was certified platinum in the United States.

== History ==
=== Beginnings (2007) ===
Kyle Even, born on September 21, 1985, and David Schmitt, born on March 26, 1988, spent their early years playing in various local Colorado musical groups. After being introduced to alternative rock by an older stepbrother, Even moved towards vocals as a teen. Before joining Breathe Carolina, Even performed in the band Rivendale. They produced an extended play called Portrait of Shadows. Schmitt, on the other hand, started on bass at the age of 12 and then branched out to guitar performing in Colorado with As the Flood Waters Rose (later called the Autobiography).

Both bands played together often. As the Flood Waters Rose opened for Rivendale at Rivendale's album release at Grandpa's Music Box in Thornton, Colorado. After leaving As the Flood Waters Rose, Schmitt started recording his own song on GarageBand, which he later asked Even to participate in creating. As both bands broke up for the members' departure for college, Even and Schmitt began Breathe Carolina.

=== It's Classy, Not Classic (2007–2009) ===
Breathe Carolina started in 2007 with Even and Schmitt recording songs on the music-creating software GarageBand for fun. They created a MySpace profile, gaining over 10,000 song plays in 2008 and accumulating over 30 million plays during 2009. The name Breathe Carolina came from a dream which Schmitt had in 9th grade, about calming down a woman named Carolina. Soon afterwards, Even quit his job as a photographer to tour with the group full-time. Their first EP, Gossip, was released via iTunes on November 26, 2007. In May 2008, the duo signed with Rise Records and announced the release date of their debut studio album, It's Classy, Not Classic. Breathe Carolina performed at the Bamboozle Left in April 2008.

Breathe Carolina recorded their first album using GarageBand. The album introduced a few new songs that were not featured on Gossip, including "The Introduction", "No Vacancy", "Show Me Yours", "Classified", "That's Classy", and "You Wish". The album was written, recorded and produced by Schmitt in his home studio in Denver. The album was available for streaming on their PureVolume page on September 1, 2008, before it was officially released on September 16. It's Classy, Not Classic debuted on the Billboard 200 at number 186. Breathe Carolina headlined their fall 2008 tour with Every Avenue, Brokencyde, and The Morning Of. They also supported Pierce the Veil on their "The Delicious Tour" in November 2008. Breathe Carolina released the lead single from the album, "Diamonds" on February 4, 2009, along with its music video. The video features appearances made by Millionaires, as well as Josh White from Umbrella Clothing and This City Is Burning Records. In February 2009, they embarked on the Take Action tour with support from Cute Is What We Aim For, Meg & Dia, Every Avenue, and Anarbor. Breathe Carolina was featured on Punk Goes Pop 2 performing the track, "See You Again", which was released in March 2009.

=== Hello Fascination (2009–2010) ===
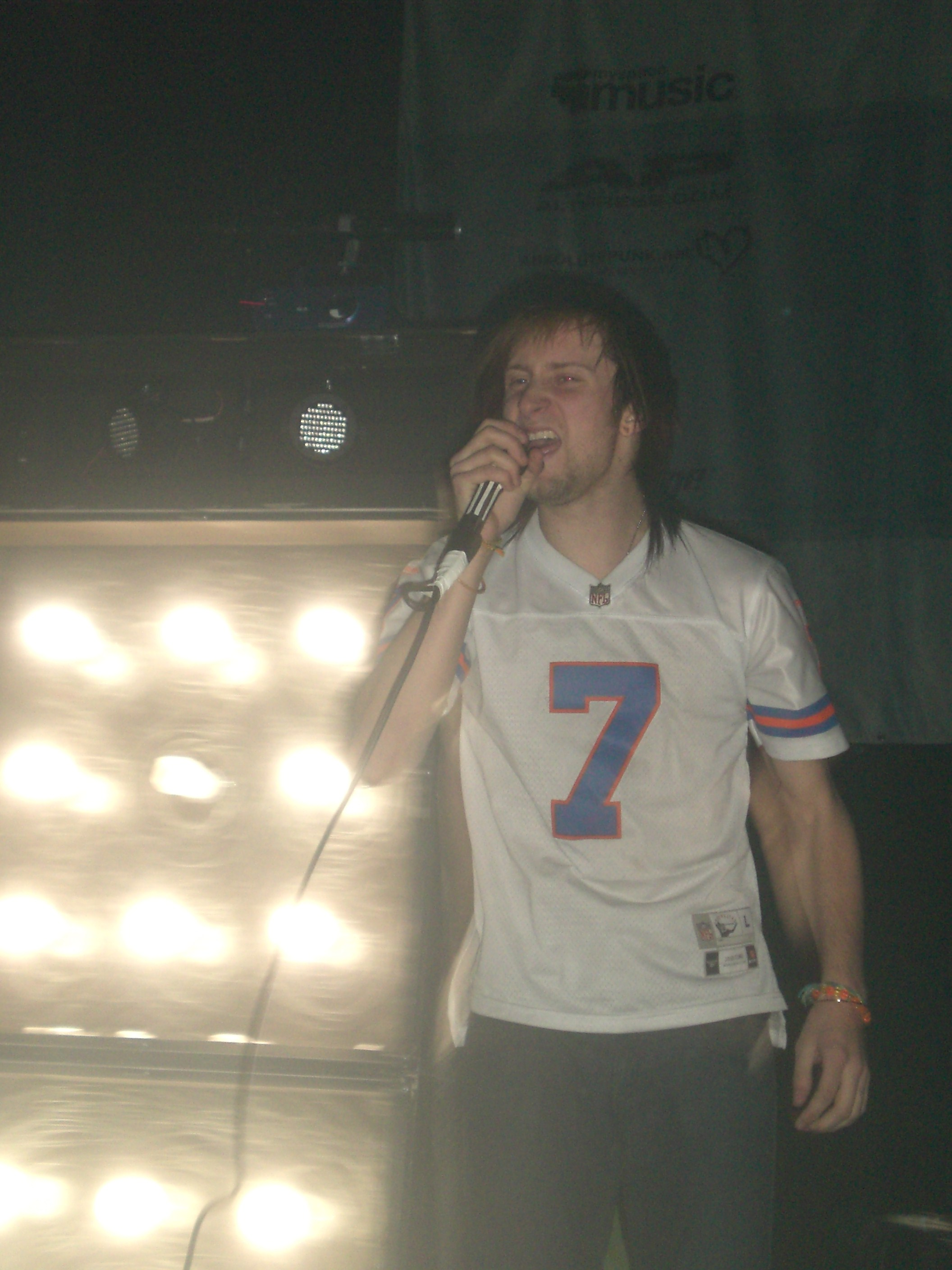
Even performing in February 2009

In April 2009, Breathe Carolina left Rise Records and signed with Fearless Records. The duo began working on their second studio album that same month with producer Mike Green. According to Even, the album describes their "vision of everything we are." On June 29, 2009, the first song from Hello Fascination was released: "Welcome To Savannah". The duo premiered the lead single from the album, "Hello Fascination" on their MySpace page on July 25, 2009. Hello Fascination was released on August 18, 2009. The album peaked at number 43 on the Billboard 200 and sold 11,000 copies in its first week. They performed on the Vans Warped Tour in 2009 and Breathe Carolina also joined Family Force 5 on their Dance Rawr Dance 3 tour from September to October 2009.

Breathe Carolina toured in the UK in January 2010. The deluxe edition of Hello Fascination was released on July 6, 2010. On June 23, Schmitt and Even launched a clothing line called Blush. "I.D.G.A.F." was released as the second single from the album, with the music video being released on July 30, 2010. The duo performed at Vans Warped Tour in 2010. In the fall of 2010, they joined Mayday Parade on the Fearless Friends tour. They covered the song "Down" by Jay Sean for the compilation album Punk Goes Pop 3 that was released on November 2, 2010. Their cover peaked at number 31 on the US Rock Digital Song Sales chart.

On November 21, 2010, Breathe Carolina released their second ever Christmas-themed song for a part on the 'Tis the Season to Be Fearless compilation album. The song is titled "Mile-High Christmas".

=== Hell Is What You Make It (2011–2012) ===
Recording for the third studio album took place in early 2011 in Los Angeles. It is the first album in which Breathe Carolina recorded as a full band. They worked producers with Ian Kirkpatrick and Matt Squire on the album. The album's lead single, "Blackout", was available for streaming via MTV Buzzworthy on June 13, 2011, and was released for digital download the following day. On June 16, the duo performed "Blackout" for a nationwide television presentation on Jimmy Kimmel Live. The song became a commercial success, peaking at number 32 on the Billboard Hot 100. The song was certified platinum by the RIAA. "Blackout" also peaked at number one on the UK Independent Singles chart. A music video for the track was shot in Los Angeles on July 1 and 2, and was released on the duo's official Vevo page on YouTube on September 20.

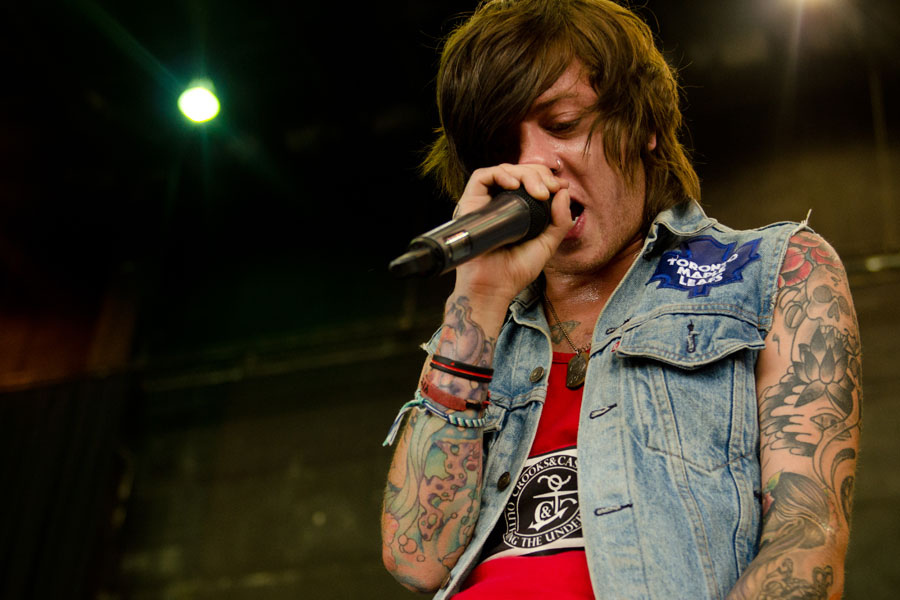
Schmitt performing with Breathe Carolina at Aaron's Amphitheatre in Lakewood on Warped Tour 2012, Atlanta

Their third studio album, Hell Is What You Make It was released on July 12, 2011. The album peaked at number 41 on the Billboard 200. The group participated on the Scream It Like You Mean It 2011 tour during the summer to promote the album. An extended play titled Blackout: The Remixes EP was released on September 27 via iTunes. In November 2011, the duo was named MTV Push Artist of the Week. They were nominated for Favorite Breakthrough Band by MTV in December 2011.

On December 23, 2011, it was announced that the duo signed with Columbia Records. In 2012, the duo re-entered the studio and began writing and recording new tracks. Throughout early 2012, the duo participated in the Blackout Forever tour alongside the Ready Set with guest appearances by Ashland HIGH and Matt Toka. A new single, "Hit and Run", premiered via Alternative Press on May 21. The song reached number 19 on the US Dance/Electronic Digital Song Sales chart and sold 20,000 copies in its first week. A deluxe edition of the album titled, Hell Is What You Make It: RELOADED was released on July 10, 2012, featuring the single "Hit and Run", a remix version of the song and "Reaching for the Floor". Breathe Carolina performed at the 2012 Warped Tour. The duo contributed to the compilation album Punk Goes Pop 5 with their cover of Michael Jackson's "Billie Jean".

=== Savages (2013–2014) ===
On March 25, 2013, it was announced that the title of their fourth studio album would be called Savages. According to Schmitt, the album is "about just being a free spirit and doing what you want to do." He also added that the album was EDM-influenced. On July 6, 2013, the duo released their first mixtape Bangers for free download via Sol Republic. The mixtape is composed of three unreleased songs: "Skeletons", "Riot" and "Mistakes", which the latter was included on the album Savages. Following its release the band toured in North America with the Ready Set and rapper T. Mills. From October to November 2013, Breathe Carolina joined Sleeping with Sirens on their headlining Feel This tour. On October 15, 2013, it was announced that founding member Kyle Even departed the band, due to his new responsibilities as a father. The group also announced Tommy Cooperman as an official member, who served as a touring member earlier in the year.

Following Even's departure, the group released the lead single from their fourth studio album "Savages" on November 25, 2013, along with a lyrics video. The band embarked on the We Are Savages tour, touring with Jonny Craig, Mod Sun, and Ghost Town in early 2014. The album's second single, "Sellouts" featuring Danny Worsnop from Asking Alexandria, was released on February 18, 2014, along with its music video. "Bang It Out" was released on March 18, 2014, as the album's third single and features Amy Renee Noonan (Queen Herby) of Karmin.

A music video for their fourth single "Chasing Hearts" featuring Tyler Carter from metalcore band Issues was released on April 15, 2014, followed by another for their fifth single "Collide" featuring clips from their album's release party in Los Angeles. On April 15, 2014, Savages was released selling 14,000 copies in its first week, topping the Billboard Dance/Electronic Albums chart and peaked at No. 22 on the Billboard 200. The group performed at Warped Tour in the summer of 2014. On September 9, 2014, Breathe Carolina released a collaboration with Candyland, "Find Someone", on SoundCloud. In October and November 2014, they co-headlined a tour with Candyland on "The Friend Zone Tour". A reboot version of the sixth and final single from the album, "I Don't Know What I'm Doing" was released on October 17, 2014, with Oscar Olivo. On October 29, 2014, the group premiered a music video for "Shadows" via PopCrush.

=== Sleepless, Coma and Oh So Hard (2015–2018) ===
In 2015, Breathe Carolina was featured on the track "All I Wanna" by Disco Fries from their Autonomous EP. On June 9, 2015, the band released a new single with producer APEK, titled "Anywhere But Home" via Zouk Recordings. On November 20, 2015, the band premiered a new single in collaboration with artist Ryos, featuring uncredited vocals from Karra, titled "More Than Ever", and was released via Spinnin' Records. On November 22, they released a free two-track EP, titled More Than Ever: The Thank You EP. The EP comprised the acoustic version of "More Than Ever" and a remix of "Anywhere But Home" by American DJ Landis. On December 14, 2015, the duo released Stars & Moon, a collaboration with producer Shanahan and American singer Haliene. The single went on to receive five million Spotify streams and enjoyed heavy rotation on BPM (Sirius XM) Dance radio. The song peaked at number 26 on the Billboard Dance/Mix Show Airplay chart. The track was featured in Enhanced Best of 2015, a compilation album released by Enhanced Music.

On February 1, 2016, the band released another free EP called Ruins: The Thank You EP. A new EP titled Sleepless was released on September 16, 2016. The group collaborated with different artists on the EP including Jay Cosmic, Haliene and Crossnaders. Schmitt stated that they went back to their early emo roots while also experimenting with a new direction in sound. The EP debuted at number four on the US Dance/Electronic Albums chart selling 2,000 copies first week. It also reached number 36 on the US Independent Albums chart. On November 25, 2016, they premiered a new single, "Echo (Let Go)", with IZII.

On December 23, 2016, they released their Oh So Hard EP. Another EP titled, Coma was released on July 14, 2017. On February 9, 2018, they released Pt. 2 of their Oh So Hard EP. In 2018, the duo released a remix to the song "Happier" by Marshmello and Bastille.

=== Dead: The Album (2019–2023) ===
The band released their fifth studio album, Dead: The Album, on November 15, 2019, on Spinnin' Records and Big Beat. Schmitt stated that the album is "like a breath of fresh air" and had a vibe they haven't heard come from anyone. "Too Good" was released on September 13, 2019, as the lead single from the album. The album also spawned two other singles: "Like This" and "Drive". A day before the album was released, Breathe Carolina premiered the fourth single "July" along with its music video. They also released an acoustic EP, Dead: The Acoustic and a remix album, Dead: The Remixes. The album debuted at number six on the Billboard Dance Album Sales chart. The duo embarked on a headlining tour called, Dead: The Tour. In 2019, Breathe Carolina released a remix to Smash Mouth's "All Star" to celebrate the 20th anniversary of the song.

Since Dead: The Album, Breathe Carolina released numerous non-album singles, including "Promises" with Dropgun and Reigns. The song peaked at number eight on the US Dance/Electronic Digital Song Sales chart. In 2022, they collaborated with Martin Garrix and released the single, "Something". The duo performed at the 2023 So What Music Festival.

=== Raindrops (2024) ===
On March 8, 2024, the duo released the EP, Raindrops. Prior to its release, they released two singles in promotion, "Drag Me Down" and "Alone Tonight", with Schmitt returning on lead vocals.

Breathe Carolina performed at the When We Were Young Festival in Winchester, Nevada from October 18–19, 2025 with Even performing for the first time since 2013. On December 4, 2025, Breathe Carolina performed in Anaheim, California with Millionaires and 3OH!3 celebrating the 15-year anniversary of Streets of Gold.

The band are confirmed to be making an appearance at Welcome to Rockville, which will take place in Daytona Beach, Florida in May 2026.

== Musical style and arrangement ==
Breathe Carolina has mainly been categorized as electropop, EDM and electronic rock. Post-hardcore influence also existed in the majority of earlier work by the band, evident by the use of screamed vocals and breakdowns. These elements, however, were usually kept to a minimum while electronic elements took precedence. This fusion of post-hardcore characteristics and dance-oriented electronica had once led the group to be labeled crunkcore as well. Also typical of crunkcore is the prevalent use of Auto-Tune and vocoders on Schmitt's vocals.

Their debut studio album, It's Classy, Not Classic has been described as electropop, emo and dance music that also blends hardcore-influence of screamo. Their second studio album, Hello Fascination features electronica and emo pop sounds with elements of crunkcore and screamo. The vocoder vocals on the album drew comparison to Daft Punk and Roxette. Their third studio album Hell Is What You Make It is mainly rooted in dance, pop, rock and electronic music. The album also experiments with trance and dubstep music. Their fourth studio album, Savages has been described as electropop and emo pop, with influences of EDM and rock music. Their fifth studio album, Dead: The Album has been described as EDM, including elements of pop and R&B.

Although much instrumentation is added through programming, typical instruments were also present in their music in select songs; Schmitt provided lead singing vocals for the duo along with playing the guitar and drums while Even provided unclean vocals and occasional cleans in their newer material. Live performances by Breathe Carolina usually consisted of an arrangement of three extra members providing keyboards, keytars, drums, guitars and bass. During most live sets, Joshua Aragon played guitar (when necessary) and performs backing vocals while Eric Armenta provided drums on a standard drum kit all while Schmitt and Even performed the clean and unclean vocal positions respectively.

Since the departure of Kyle Even and the addition of DJ/guitarist Tommy Cooperman, Breathe Carolina became a four piece band. Live performances consisted of the four members and occasional extra musicians like Michael Naran (currently in the Ready Set and Sparks the Rescue). When they performed the song "Sellouts" live, Breathe Carolina is joined by a screaming vocalist, usually the lead vocalist from another band, while Luis Bonet and Tommy Cooperman performed guitar parts. After the departure of Bonet in 2015 and Armenta in 2017, Breathe Carolina is now a duo focusing mainly on a variety of styles within the EDM genre.

== Controversies ==
On December 14, 2022, Breathe Carolina member Tommy Cooperman was arrested and charged for engaging in a $114 million "pump and dump" scheme along with several others by the Justice Department and the SEC. According to reports, Cooperman along with others, "allegedly engaged in a wide-ranging securities fraud conspiracy" in which the defendants used their social media presence on Twitter and Discord. The incident took place from around January 2020 to April 2022 and Cooperman was charged with two counts of securities fraud.

In March 2024, a federal judge dismissed the Justice Department's criminal indictment against Cooperman, saying, "The key question is whether one statement by one of the co-defendants that 'we're robbing ... idiots of their money,' which is alleged in the Indictment, is sufficient. This statement sufficiently alleges 'intent to defraud' ... but does not on its own sufficiently allege that Defendants executed, or conspired to execute, a 'scheme to defraud'". The SEC's case is still pending.

== Members ==
Current members

- David Schmitt – lead vocals, guitars, bass, keyboards, synthesizer, drums, percussion, DJ, production, programming, mixing, mastering (2007–present)
- Tommy Cooperman – lead guitar, vocals, keyboards, synthesizer, bass, drums, percussion, DJ, production, programming, mixing, mastering (2013–present)

Former members

- Kyle Even – unclean vocals, clean vocals, backing vocals, programming, guitars, bass (2007–2013, guest 2025)
- Joshua Aragon – keyboards, lead guitar, keytar, bass, backing vocals (2007–2013)
- Luis Bonet – keyboards, keytar, guitar, bass, DJ, production programming, mixing, mastering (2008–2015)
- Eric Armenta – drums, percussion, production (2008–2017)

Timeline

== Discography ==
Studio albums

- It's Classy, Not Classic (2008)
- Hello Fascination (2009)
- Hell Is What You Make It (2011)
- Savages (2014)
- Dead: The Album (2019)

== Awards and nominations ==
=== DJ Mag ===
==== Top 100 DJs ====
Year	Position	Movement	Source
2017	121	New Entry	
2018	77	Up 44	
2019	62	Up 15	
2020	63	Down 1	
2021	62	Up 1	
2022	79	Down 17	

=== MTV Buzzworthy ===
Year	Nominated	Award	Result	Ref.
2010	"Hello Fascination"	Best Freshmen Video	Nominated	
2011	Breathe Carolina	Favorite Breakthrough Band	Nominated	

== Tours ==
Headlining

- Fearless Friends Tour (2010)
- The Spring Break Your Heart Tour (2011)
- Scream It Like You Mean It Tour (2011)
- We Are Savages Tour (2014)
- Dead: The Tour (2019)

Co-headlining

- Blackout Forever Tour (with the Ready Set) (2012)
- The Friend Zone Tour (with Candyland) (2014)

Opening act

- Feel This Tour (Sleeping with Sirens) (2013)
