= The Daily Habit =

- Genre: Extreme sports
- Starring: Pat Parnell
- Country of origin: United States
- No. of seasons: 7
- No. of episodes: 960

Production
- Running time: 30 minutes

Original release
- Network: Fuel TV
- Release: October 3, 2005

The Daily Habit is a sports telecast airing on Fuel TV hosted by Pat Parnell. The show features personalities in the world of extreme sports, including surfboarding, skateboarding, snowboarding, as well as other personalities from entertainment and popular music such as rock bands from the 1990s and today. The Daily Habit began airing on October 3, 2005. Its seventh season began airing on September 1, 2011. In October 2011, ESPN reported that the show had been cancelled. The final taping was scheduled for November 22, and the show was set to air until the end of the year.
