= Crossnaders =

Dutch electronic music producer

- Origin: Breda, Netherlands
- Genres: Electro house; progressive house; trap; future bass; big room house; breakbeat; bass house
- Years active: 2014–present
- Labels: Smash The House; Spinnin' Records; Revealed Recordings; Wolv Records; Stmpd Rcrds; Metanoia Music; CYB3RPVNK; Dharma Worldwide; Skink Records; Musical Freedom; CLUBTRXX; BIP Records
- Members: Shane Muller; Bob Sandee

Crossnaders are a Dutch electronic music producer and DJ duo who include Shane Muller and Bob Sandee.

== Career ==
In 2014 Crossnaders released their first track "Karambit" on BIP Records. After a year they made a debut on CLUBTRXX with their new single "Akimbo". During 2015 they became a part of Metanoia Music and released a collaboration with Joe Ghost "Frostfire". In 2016 Dyro signed Crossnaders on his music label Wolv Records and the Dutch duo released a collaboration with Tom Ferro "Terror". That year they also worked with Skink Records and released "Cray". The year 2017 was extremely important for Crossnaders. First of all, they signed a contract with Spinnin' Records. Then they released a collaboration with KSHMR "Back To Me". 2018 saw their debut on Smash The House (collaboration with Bassjackers "Last Fight") and Stmpd Rcrds (collaboration with CMC$ "Baller"). Their solo track "Damn Homie" was released on Dharma Worldwide on 31 August 2018.

== Discography ==
=== Extended plays ===
Title	Year	Record label
Episode 1 - Into Hyperspace	2017	Spinnin' Premium
World Party	2020	Mixmash Deep

=== Singles ===
Title	Released	Record label	Additional information
"Karambit"	2014	BIP Records	
"Akimbo"	2015	CLUBTRXX	
"Frostfire"	2015	Metanoia Music	with Joe Ghost
"Terror"	2016	Wolv Records	with Tom Ferro
"Cray"	2016	Skink Records	with Tom Ferro - included in "Skinkalation Vol.2 EP"
"Stable"	2016	Spinnin' Records	with Breathe Carolina - included in Breathe Carolina "Sleepless EP"
"Vanish"	2016	Spinnin' Records	with Breathe Carolina featuring KARRA - included in Breathe Carolina "Sleepless EP"
"EMF"	2016	Spinnin' Records	with Quintino - included in Quintino "Go Harded EP Part 2"
"That Freak"	2016	Wolv Records	with Ale Mora featuring MC Gunner
"Back To Me"	2017	Spinnin' Records	with KSHMR featuring Micky Blue
"Drop It Low"	2017	Wolv Records	with D-Wayne
"Pound That"	2017	Spinnin' Records	with VOVIII
"Last Fight"	2018	Smash The House	vs. Bassjackers
"Baller"	2018	Stmpd Rcrds	with CMC$
"Beat U Back"	2019	Smash The House	
"Bring It Back"	2019	CYB3RPVNK	with SMACK
"Tarantino"	2019	Dharma Worldwide	with 22Bullets
"Tecno"	2019	Revealed Recordings	
"Destress"	2020	Revealed Recordings	included in "Revealed Recordings presents Miami Festival EP 2020"
"Soul"	2020	Nyx / Future House Music	
"Pump Up"	2020	Future House Music	
"Movin You"	2020	Smash Deep	

=== Remixes ===
Title	Released	Record label	Additional information
"Cheat Codes and Dante Klein - Let Me Hold You (Turn Me On)"	2016	Spinnin' Remixes	with Lost Stories
"Quintino and Cheat Codes - Can't Fight It"	2016	Spinnin' Remixes	
"Bassjackers - Fireflies"	2017	Spinnin' Records	included in Bassjackers "Les Pays Bass EP"
"Bassjackers and Lucas & Steve featuring Caroline Pennell – These Heights"	2017	Spinnin' Remixes	
"APEK - Upside Down featuring Carly Paige"	2018	Musical Freedom	
"R3hab featuring Lia Marie Johnson – The Wave"	2018	CYB3RPVNK	
"Cash Cash featuring Nasri - Call Me"	2019	Big Beat Records	

=== Free Tracks ===
Title	Released	Additional information
"D.BEAM & GIOSER - Pulse (Crossnaders Remix)"	2015	
"Headhunterz & KSHMR - Dharma (Crossnaders Remix)"	2016	
"Crossnaders - Spear"	2016	
"Nero – Two Minds (KSHMR & Crossnaders Remix)"	2017	with KSHMR
