= Candyland (group) =

American musical duo

- Genres: Electro house, EDM
- Occupation(s): Producer, musician
- Years active: 2011–present
- Labels: Sweet Shop Records; Monstercat; Smog Records; Seeking Blue; Spinnin'
- Members: Josie Martin (2011–present); Ethan Davis (2011–2014), (2021–present)
- Website: soundcloud.com/candylanddjs/

Candyland is an American electronic music duo consisting of Josephine "Josie" Mary Martin (born December 17, 1988) and Ethan Davis.

In 2014, Ethan Davis officially left the project, therefore transforming Candyland into a solo act. However, in July 2021, Ethan and Josie announced that they had reunited as a duo, and they released their comeback single "Nirvana" in 2022.

== Critical reception ==
Matthew Meadow of Your EDM described "Speechless" as having "a fresh groove to it that definitely heats up the dancefloor" with "a strong house vibe that combines with flutes and synths from tropical house, creating a pleasant combination that works for any setting."

EDM Sauce stated that the "new Candyland gem brings infectious vocals, punchy basslines, melody-rich flute and synth elements, as well as an overall feel-good vibe."

Alexander Davis of EDMTunes said "While 'Speechless' is a clear departure from banging big room, it still has a refined groove that is sure to ignite the dance floor", going on to comment that "Candyland deftly fuses indie-leaning vocals with strong electronic textures that give the tune a deep groove that will have you moving before you know it."

== Discography ==
=== Singles ===
List of singles as lead artist, showing year released and album name
Title	Year	Peak chart positions	Album
Title	Year	US Dance	Album
"NSFW" (with REVOKE)	2014	—	Non-album singles
"Find Someone" (with Breathe Carolina)	2014	―	Non-album singles
"Rage in Love"	2015	—	Non-album singles
"Murda"	2015	—	Non-album singles
"Speechless" (featuring RKCB)	2015	46	Non-album singles
"Faces" (with Shoffy)	2016	—	Non-album singles
"Touch Me" (with Ricci)	2016	—	Non-album singles
"Just Fro with It"	2017	—	Non-album singles
"Nirvana"	2022	—	TBA
