= As You Are (album) =

Studio album by Jason Lancaster
- Released: June 23, 2014
- Recorded: Late 2013–early 2014
- Genre: Alternative rock, pop rock
- Length: 39:38
- Label: Outerloop
- Producer: Zack Odom, Kenneth Mount

Singles from As You Are
- 1. "Come Back" Released: May 13, 2014

As You Are is the debut album of former Go Radio and Mayday Parade frontman Jason Lancaster. It is the first new release from Lancaster after he left Go Radio in 2013. It was released on June 23, 2014, under Outerloop Records, an imprint of Fearless Records, and it peaked at 183 on Billboard Top 200.

== Background ==
After Go Radio's breakup, vocalist/guitarist Jason Lancaster immediately made it clear that he was not done with music. Within days of Go Radio announcing their breakup, Lancaster revealed in an Instagram post that he would be contributing an original song entitled "All I Can Give You" to the Fearless compilation Punk Goes Christmas. When the compilation was released on November 4, 2013, it became the first officially released song of Lancaster's solo career.

On December 17, 2013 Lancaster announced a campaign on the crowdfunding site Indiegogo to support the production of a new solo album, confirming that he would be embarking on a solo career. He also announced that the title of the record would be As You Are. He appeared very excited about the record, saying, "My new effort “As You Are" is going to be a pure and honest endeavor of who I am as a person and a solo musician." Perks included a private solo performance, handwritten lyrics, and an exclusive mixtape containing the song "If". The campaign ended on February 14, 2014, having gone on for almost three months and having raised $36,320 of its $40,000 goal.

== Production ==
The album was produced by Zack Odom and Kenneth Mount. Lancaster previously worked with Odom and Mount on A Lesson in Romantics (2007) (with Mayday Parade), and Do Overs and Second Chances (2010) (with Go Radio). Lancaster spoke positively about working with the team, saying, "Being able to take this record all the way from A to Z is something I've always wanted and being able to do it with Zack and Kenneth really pushed it to a new level," and, "Making the record with these guys was an amazing experience for me." Odum and Mount have spoken positively about Jason in return, with Mount citing how impressed he was with Jason's musical skill. Odum has stated that his favorite song from the album was "Climb Up to My Window".

=== Composition ===
Lancaster has stated that his primary inspirations for this album were his Christian faith, and his wife and child. The overall theme of this album is "Be yourself". The song "Save Me", for example, is about the night Lancaster reaffirmed his faith in God. Lancaster has stated that this song is the song that best represents his basic style for this album, and that it's the most personal and meaningful to him of all the songs on the record. "Just In Time" is about Lancaster's love for his wife, and it was released to celebrate the couple's anniversary. "Change" is a song giving thanks to Lancaster's fans and supporters. "Do I" is a song about Lancaster's stubbornness in arguments – it was written as an apology to his wife after a minor dispute that they had.

Odom has said that he enjoyed the creative freedom that he, Lancaster, and Mount were given. Because of this freedom, Odom has said that musically, the album isn't defined by genre – Lancaster was allowed to experiment with whatever genre he wants.

In regard to how the writing process works without the support of a band, Lancaster has said, "It's so much easier," celebrating that there was little arguing or fighting over how the album should sound. He has stated that he began his solo career because he, "wanted to be in a position where he could do whatever I wanted to do with the music."

In an interview Lancaster told the story of why he decided to cover The Beatles' "Hey Jude". The cover was another song dedicated to Lancaster's wife, Dee Lancaster. Before the two had gotten married, Dee had dated several musicians, and every year for her birthday, someone would play the song for her. So, Jason decided to "one-up" her previous boyfriends by doing a professional cover.

=== Title and artwork ===
The album's title comes from a phrase that Lancaster and his wife said to each other, to signify that they love each other "as they are". Lancaster has said that this phrase applies to his songwriting process for this album, because for the first time, he didn't feel limited by any genre – he could just write songs as they were.

The album cover was created and designed by Bethany Grace White.

== Release ==
A demo version of the song "Just in Time" was made available on YouTube on November 11, 2013, before As You Are was officially announced. The demo was accompanied by a video featuring pictures of Lancaster with his family – in particular, his wife, Dee Lancaster – to celebrate the anniversary of Lancaster's marriage. Later, on January 2, 2014, a demo version of the song "Change" was made available on YouTube, and it was tentatively announced that this would be the first song on As You Are. (This was later confirmed, when the official track listing was released.) The video was accompanied by a message from Lancaster thanking his fans and supporters. However, neither song was officially released as a single.

The first and only single from the album, "Come Back", was officially released on May 13, 2014, in a premier hosted by Alternative Press. An official lyric video was posted to YouTube by Outerloop Records on this date. Also on this date, As You Are became available for pre-order through iTunes and Alternative Press.

The album was released on June 23, 2014. It peaked at 182 on Billboard Top 200. After the release of the album, Lancaster briefly joined Warped Tour 2014, but mostly played local shows in Tallahassee and Orlando. Zack Odom and Kenneth Mount, the album's producers, played backup for Jason during these shows, along with Maxx Danziger from Set It Off. Later, he toured with SayWeCanFly, Rookie of the Year, and Joel Faviere to support the album. Lancaster has spoken about his immense satisfaction with the process of making and releasing this album, calling the first show of Warped Tour 2014, "The highlight of my career."

== Critical reception ==
Professional ratings
Review scores
Source	Rating
AbsolutePunk	9.2/10
Allmusic	3.5/5 stars
Infectious Magazine	favorable
Kill Your Stereo	73/100
New Noise Magazine	favorable
RichardThinks	6/10 stars

Reception to this album from critics was generally positive, with critics praising Lancaster's vocals and songwriting. For example, Sami Marshall of Infectious Magazine agreed, saying, "He has the perfect opener and closer, and everything in between works like a well-oiled machine." Devin M. Durbin of AbsolutePunk agreed as well, saying, "Jason’s creativity and passion shines through on each and every track," and that, "This album stands out as the most fine-tuned and exciting album of Jason Lancaster’s career." However, Michael Bird of Richard Thinks was more mixed in his opinion, calling the album, "A good opening step in a solo career, then, but not the bound that could have been."

Critics universally praised Lancaster's vocal performance on the album. Kill Your Stereo's review calls his vocals, "blisteringly powerful". Bird of Richard Thinks agreed, saying, "The musical tapestries of the album are often intricate but don’t feel overblown, this providing the ideal backing to Lancaster’s distinctive impassioned vocal delivery." The Kill Your Stereo review wasn't quite as positive on this front, saying, "It is apparent As You Are may be unwaveringly familiar and at times a little monochromatic in flavour."

Critics were more divided on Lancaster's cover of "Hey Jude". Some liked it, such as Marshall of Infectious Magazine who said, "[Lancaster] stays true to The Beatles, but adds his own rock influences in to [sic] the mix, giving it a modern feel." However, Michael Bird of Richard Thinks disagreed, saying, "A near note-for-note cover of the classic ‘Hey Jude’, meanwhile, is a pointless and disappointing note to end on." Durbin of AbsolutePunk, however, disagreed, praising the "beautiful honesty" in songs such as "The Cause" and "Save Me". Of the latter, he said, "The passion in which he plays and sings during this song sent chills down my spine and with each listen it grew and grew on me." Marshall of Infectious Magazine also enjoyed "Save Me", and he praised its honesty.

Many critics noted similarities between this album and Lancaster's previous releases. Durbin of Absolute Punk in particular noticed many similarities, saying, "Not much has changed overall in his songbook." Durbin says that influences from Mayday Parade and Go Radio can be heard in songs such as "The Cause", "Growing Up", and "Save Me" – in particular, he felt "The Cause" was very similar to "Redemption in the Verse" from Lucky Street. However, he notes that the lyrical content of the songs have changed, saying, "Gone are the bitter songs about ex-girlfriends, and wrongdoings."

== Track listing ==
All tracks are written by Jason Lancaster except where noted.

No.	Title	Length
1.	"Change"	1:23
2.	"Growing Up"	2:51
3.	"Save Me"	3:19
4.	"Come Back"	3:23
5.	"You 'N' Me"	4:10
6.	"Climb Up to My Window"	3:10
7.	"Adam"	2:28
8.	"Do I"	3:40
9.	"Just in Time"	3:47
10.	"Shine"	3:22
11.	"The Cause"	3:16
12.	"Hey Jude" (The Beatles cover – written by John Lennon and Paul McCartney)	4:59
Total length:		39:38

Indiegogo exclusive
No.	Title	Length
13.	"If"	–

== Personnel ==
- Jason Lancaster – Vocals, Guitar, Piano, Bass guitar, Drums
- Zack Odom – Producer
- Kenneth Mount – Producer
- Bethany Grace White – cover artwork

== Commercial performance ==
Chart (2014)	Peak position
U.S. Billboard 200	182
U.S. Billboard Heatseekers Albums	4
U.S. Billboard Independent Albums	37
U.S. Billboard Top Rock Albums	44
