= Ian Kirkpatrick (music producer) =

American record producer and songwriter (born 1982)

- Born: Ian Eric Kirkpatrick; September 20, 1982 (age 44)
- Occupations: Record producer; songwriter
- Years active: 2006–present

Ian Eric Kirkpatrick (born September 20, 1982) is an American record producer and songwriter based in Los Angeles. He has produced and written music for many high-profile artists such as Backstreet Boys, Britney Spears, Dua Lipa, Jason Derulo, Justin Bieber, Katy Perry, Nick Jonas, Pitbull, Sabrina Carpenter, Selena Gomez, Shakira, and The Chainsmokers. Kirkpatrick's writing catalogue includes songs which have amassed over a billion streams individually on streaming platform Spotify.

Kirkpatrick is managed by Dan Petel of This Is Noise Management.

== Early life ==
Kirkpatrick identifies as an "Irish Moroccan Jew" due to his mother's Casablanca roots and his father's Irish origins.

Kirkpatrick grew up in Encino, Los Angeles. He was first introduced to music at the age of 5 years, when he received a drum set for his birthday. Throughout his teenage years, Kirkpatrick played in some small bands in junior high and high school. He briefly studied economics at the University of California, Santa Cruz while simultaneously producing music, before pursuing music full-time.

== Career ==
In 1997, the Aphex Twin song "Girl/Boy Song" drove Kirkpatrick to use computerised production methods to make similar electronic music. At the start of his career, Kirkpatrick started a recording studio in the garage of Petel's parents where he recorded for local bands before moving to bands on labels such as Hollywood Records, Fearless Records and Drive-Thru Records.

Initially, Kirkpatrick also produced music for Warped Tour groups such as Breathe Carolina, Neon Trees, Young the Giant, and the Plain White T’s, before signing a publishing deal with Warner Chappell Music.

Kirkpatrick’s early success as a producer led to him co-writing with other songwriters and musical artists. In 2015, he met major breakthrough with writing and production involvement in singer Jason Derulo's “Want to Want Me” and went on to collaborate with singer Selena Gomez starting in 2017.

Kirkpatrick has incorporated Steinberg Cubase into his production workflow, utilizing this software on projects such as Dua Lipa's "Don't Start Now". He is able to play keys and guitar, but expresses more familiarity in drums. He cites Aphex Twin, Squarepusher, and Autechre as some of his artistic influences. He is based in Los Angeles.

== Discography ==
=== Singles ===
List of singles written or produced by Ian Kirkpatrick, with selected chart positions, year released and certifications.
Year	Title	Peak chart positions								Certifications
Year	Title	US	US Pop	US Hot AC	AUS	CAN	NZ	SWE	UK	Certifications
2023	"Knockoff" Poppy	–	–	–	–	–	–	–	–	
2020	"Matches"; Britney Spears and Backstreet Boys	–	–	–	–	–	–	–	—	
2019	"Don't Start Now" Dua Lipa	2	1	1	2	3	3	12	2	US: 3× Platinum; UK (BPI): 2× Platinum; Italy (FIMI): Platinum; NZ: Platinum
2019	"Look at Her Now" Selena Gomez	27	–	–	29	13	23	20	26	
2018	"Back to You"; Selena Gomez	18	4	9	4	4	8	14	13	US: 2× Platinum; Aus (ARIA): 2× Platinum; UK (BPI): Platinum; NZ: Gold
2017	"New Rules"; Dua Lipa	6	1	13	2	7	3	7	1	US: 5× Platinum; Aus (ARIA): 3× Platinum; UK (BPI): 2× Platinum; BVMI: Gold; Canada: Platinum; NZ: 2× Platinum
2017	"Bad Liar"; Selena Gomez	20	16	–	13	15	17	23	23	US: Platinum; Aus (ARIA): Platinum; Canada: Platinum; Italy (FIMI): Gold; UK (BPI): Gold
2017	"Options"; Pitbull ft. Stephen Marley	–	–	–	–	–	3	–	—	NZ: Gold
2016	"If It Ain't Love"; Jason Derulo	67	18	–	34	37	–	44	49	
2016	"Fresh Eyes"; Andy Grammer	59	–	9	5	59	8	33	50	Aus (ARIA): 2× Platinum; Canada: Platinum; NZ: Gold
2016	"Now and Later"; Sage the Gemini	93	–	–	19	45	12	12	17	Aus (ARIA): Platinum; Canada: Platinum; Germany (BVMI): Gold; Italy (FIMI): Gold; IFPI Denmark: Gold; NZ: Gold; UK (BPI): Silver
2015	"Want to Want Me; Jason Derulo	5	1	3	4	5	3	13	1	US: 3× Platinum; Aus (ARIA): 2× Platinum; UK (BPI): Platinum; BVMI: Platinum; IFPI AUT: Gold; IFPI SWI: Platinum; Canada: Gold; NZ: Platinum
2015	"Cheyenne"; Jason Derulo	66	18	39	25	42	–	–	184	Aus (ARIA): Gold
2015	"The Feeling" ft. Halsey; Justin Bieber	31	–	–	22	25	20	34	34	IFPI SWE: Gold; US: Gold
2015	"Levels"; Nick Jonas	44	14	–	79	23	16	–	46	US: Gold; Canada: Gold; NZ: Gold
2015	"Good to Be Alive (Hallelujah)"; Andy Grammer	62	12	20	–	–	–	–	—	US: Gold
2011	"Blackout"; Breathe Carolina	32	17	–	–	94	–	–	32	US: Platinum
2010	"Rhythm of Love"; Plain White T's	38	20	5	–	98	–	–	—	US: Platinum

=== Full discography ===
Year	Artist	Title	Label	Role
2026	Miley Cyrus	Nobody Wants This: Season 3 (Soundtrack from the Netflix Series) ("You (Demo)")	Atlantic Records	Writer
2026	KILIMANJARO & Dyo	THE ASCENSION (INKAWAMI) ("Not like You")	Capitol Records	Writer
2026	Ravyn Lenae	Blue Island ("Sew Me Back Together")	Atlantic Records	Writer, producer, drums, vocal sound effects
2026	Tyla	A*POP ("KISS")	Epic Records	Writer, producer, programmer
2026	Chantal Kreviazuk	In My Own Voice ("If I'm Dancing")	Wax Records	Writer
2026	December 10	On Your Side ("Infinity (123)")	Syco Records	Writer, drums, synthesizer
2025	Beny Jr & El Guincho	SAMURAI II ("Lotus Emira")	Nuevo Rico LLC	Writer, producer, keyboards
2025	Tyla	A*POP ("CHANEL")	Epic Records	Writer, producer
2025	The Chainsmokers	Breathe ("Breathe")	Columbia Records	Writer
2025	Zerb, Odeal & Victor Ray	"Space"	TH3RD BRAIN Records	Writer, producer
2025	Nine Inch Nails	TRON: Ares (Original Motion Picture Soundtrack) (All songs)	Interscope Records	Additional producer, additional programmer
2025	Jessie Reyez	PAID IN MEMORIES ("**BEGGIN 4 LUV**", "*****FREE*****")	Island Records	Writer, producer, bass, drum kit, recording engineer, guitar, keyboards, percussion, programmer
2025	Selena Gomez & benny blanco	I Said I Love You First ("Talk", "That's When I'll Care")	Interscope Records	Writer, producer
2025	Backstreet Boys	Millennium 2.0 ("Hey")	RCA Records	Writer
2025	Isabel LaRosa	Raven ("Home")	RCA Records	Writer, producer
2025	Sabrina Carpenter	Short n' Sweet (Deluxe) ("Bad Reviews")	Island Records	Writer, producer, bass programmer, piano, recording engineer
2024	Natali Noor & Shadi G	"Pari Mon Cheri"	Create Music Group	Writer, producer, arranger
2024	Sabrina Carpenter	Short n' Sweet ("Taste", "Coincidence", "Bed Chem", "Needless to Say")	Island Records	Writer, producer, background vocalist, bass, drums, guitar, keyboards, percussion, programmer, recording engineer
2024	The Chainsmokers & ELIO	No Hard Feelings ("Bad Advice")	Columbia Records	Writer, producer
2024	Dua Lipa	Radical Optimism ("Falling Forever", "Anything for Love")	Warner Records	Writer, producer, drums, programmer, guitar
2024	Leigh-Anne	No Hard Feelings ("Stealin' Love")	Warner Records	Writer, producer, programmer
2023	Troye Sivan	Something to Give Each Other ("Got Me Started", "Silly")	EMI Records	Writer, producer
2023	Olivia Rodrigo	Guts ("get him back!")	Geffen Records	Co-producer, drum programmer, engineer, synthesizer
2023	U-KNOW	Reality Show - The 3rd Mini Album ("Spotlight")	SM Entertainment	Writer
2023	Poppy	Zig ("Knockoff")	Sumerian Records	Writer
2023	Kim Petras	Feed the Beast ("uhoh")	Republic Records	Writer, producer, programmer
2023	Faouzia	"Plastic Therapy"	Atlantic Records	Writer
2023	Céline Dion	Love Again ("I'll Be")	Sony Music Canada	Writer
2023	The Chainsmokers & 347aidan	Summertime Friends ("Up & Down")	Columbia Records	Writer, producer
2023	Miley Cyrus	Endless Summer Vacation ("You")	Columbia Records	Writer
2023	Lizzo & SZA	"Special (Remix)"	Atlantic Records	Writer, producer, engineer, keyboards, programmer, instrumentation
2023	Philmon Lee & Young Thug	"Baby Don't Cry"	Epic Records	Writer, producer
2022	Olivia O'Brien	A Means to an End ("What Are We")	Island Records	Writer, producer, programmer, recording engineer
2022	Julia Michaels	"Sorry to Me Too"	Republic Records	Writer, producer
2022	Phoenix	Alpha Zulu ("Alpha Zulu")	Glassnote Records	Producer
2022	KEY & JENO	Gasoline ("Villain")	SM Entertainment	Writer
2022	Lauv	All 4 Nothing ("Time After Time")	Virgin Records	Writer
2022	Lizzo	Special ("Special", "Everybody's Gay", "Naked")	Atlantic Records	Writer, producer, engineer, keyboards, programmer, instrumentation
2022	John Legend & JID	LEGEND ("Dope")	Republic Records	Writer, producer, bass, keyboards, percussion, programmer
2022	The Chainsmokers	So Far so Good ("Riptide", "iPad", "Maradona", "Solo Mission", "Something Different", "I Love U", "If You're Serious", "Channel 1", "I Hope You Change Your Mind", "Cyanide", "The Fall" with Ship Wrek)	Columbia Records	Writer, producer
2022	Charli XCX	"Sweat"	Atlantic Records	Writer, producer
2022	Charli XCX	CRASH ("Move Me")	Atlantic Records	Writer, producer
2022	Charli XCX	CRASH ("Move Me")	Atlantic Records	Writer, producer, recording engineer
2021	Leah Kate	What Just Happened? ("Veronica")	Independent	Writer
2021	Ben Platt	Reverie ("childhood bedroom", "leave my mind")	Atlantic Records	Writer, producer, programmer
2021	Shakira	"Don't Wait Up"	Sony Music Latin	Writer, producer, recording engineer
2021	Teddy Swims	Unlearning ("Will It Find Me")	Warner Records	Writer
2021	Zara Larsson	Poster Girl ("FFF")	Epic Records	Writer, producer, engineer
2021	Sophia Messa	Ice Cream & Cigarettes ("Not That Kind of Love")	Arista Records	Writer, producer, programmer
2020	Britney Spears & Backstreet Boys	Glory (2020 Deluxe Edition) ("Matches")	RCA Records	Writer, producer
2020	Connor Bvrns	"WRECK MY NIGHT"	Create Music Group	Writer
2020	Dua Lipa & Angèle	"Fever"	Warner Records	Writer, producer
2020	Katy Perry	Smile ("Champagne Problems")	Capitol Records	Writer
2020	The Chicks	Gaslighter ("March March")	Columbia Records	Writer
2020	Jasmin Abraha	"Make It like It Was"	Famouz Records	Writer
2020	MAX CHANGMIN	Chocolate - The 1st Mini Album ("Chocolate")	SM Entertainment	Writer
2020	Dua Lipa	Future Nostalgia ("Don't Start Now", "Pretty Please")	Warner Records	Writer, producer, vocal producer, engineer, programmer, background vocalist, guitar, keyboards
2020	Kelsea Ballerini	kelsea ("the way i used to")	Black River Entertainment	Writer
2020	Selena Gomez	Rare ("Look at Her Now", "A Sweeter Place" ft. Kid Cudi, "Souvenir", "Bad Liar", "Back to You")	Interscope Records	Writer, producer, co-producer, vocal producer, arranger, engineer, background vocalist, instrumentation
2019	The Chainsmokers	World War Joy ("Push My Luck")	Columbia Records	Producer
2019	Tove Lo	Sunshine Kitty ("Really don't like u" ft. Kylie Minogue)	Universal	Writer, producer, programming
2019	Sean Paul	"When It Comes to You"	Island Records	Writer, producer, engineer
2019	DJ Snake	Carte Blanche ("No More" ft. ZHU)	Geffen Records	Writer
2019	Julia Michaels	Inner Monologue Part 2 ("Hurt Again")	Republic Records	Producer
2019	Austin Mahone	"Dancing with Nobody"	Elektra Records	Writer, producer
2019	JHart	"Temporary"		Writer
2019	Kiiara	"Open My Mouth"	Atlantic Records	Writer, producer
2019	Ellie Goulding	Brightest Blue ("Sixteen")	Polydor Records	Co-producer
2019	Ally Brooke	"Low Key" ft. Tyga	Atlantic Records	Writer, producer
2019	Backstreet Boys	DNA ("Is It Just Me")	RCA Records	Writer, producer
2019	Julia Michaels	Inner Monologue Part 1 ("Anxiety" ft. Selena Gomez, "Happy", "Deep", "Apple", "What a Time" ft. Niall Horan)	Republic Records	Writer, producer
2018	Steve Aoki	Neon Future III ("Why Are We so Broken" ft. blink-182)	Ultra Records	Writer
2018	Lauv	"There's No Way" ft. Julia Michaels	AWAL	Writer
2018	L Devine	Peer Pressure ("Runnin'")	Warner Bros. Records	Writer, producer
2018	Julia Michaels	"In This Place"	Walt Disney Records	Producer
2018	Abir	MINT ("Lose Me" ft. Buddy)		Writer
2018	New Hope Club	"Crazy"	Virgin EMI Records	Writer, producer
2018	Vice and Jason Derulo	"Make Up" ft. Ava Max	Atlantic Records	Writer, producer
2018	Chromeo	Head Over Heels ("Count Me Out", "Slumming It")		Writer, producer
2018	Shawn Mendes	Shawn Mendes ("Mutual")	Island Records	Writer, producer
2018	Kimbra	Primal Heart ("Like They Do on the TV")	Warner Bros. Records	Writer
2018	Keith Urban	Graffiti U ("Gemini")	Capitol Records	Writer, producer
2017	Jacob Sartorius	"Skateboard"	RCA Records	Writer, producer
2017	Rachel Platten	Waves ("Loveback", "Hands", "Fooling You")	Columbia Records	Writer, producer
2017	Fifth Harmony	Fifth Harmony ("Don't Say You Love Me")	Epic Records	Writer, producer
2017	Dua Lipa	Dua Lipa ("New Rules")	Warner Music Group	Writer, producer
2017	Andy Grammer	The Good Parts ("Spaceship", "Fresh Eyes")	S-Curve Records	Writer, producer, arranger
2017	Pitbull	Climate Change ("Options" ft. Stephen Marley, "Educate Ya" ft. Jason Derulo)	RCA Records	Writer, producer
2017	The Band Perry	"One Last Look"	Interscope Records	Writer
2016	Jason Derulo	"If It Ain't Love"	Warner Bros. Records	Writer, producer
2016	Jon Bellion	The Human Condition ("Morning in America")	Capitol Records	Writer, producer
2016	Britney Spears	Glory ("Hard to Forget Ya" and "If I'm Dancing")	RCA Records	Writer, producer
2016	Gavin DeGraw	Something Worth Saving ("Thank You", "Technicolor")	RCA Records	Producer
2016	Sage the Gemini	Bachelor Party ("Now and Later")	Atlantic Records	Producer
2016	Fleur East	"More and More"	Syco Music	Producer
2015	Hilary Duff	Breathe In. Breathe Out. ("Night like This" ft. Kendall Schmidt, "Outlaw")	RCA Records	Producer, writer
2015	Nick Jonas	Nick Jonas X2 ("Levels", "Area Code")	Island Records	Writer, producer
2015	Justin Bieber	Purpose ("The Feeling featuring Halsey")	Def Jam Recordings	Writer, producer
2015	Chris Brown	Royalty ("Fine by Me")	RCA Records	Writer, producer
2015	Jason Derulo	Everything Is 4 ("Want to Want Me", "Cheyenne" and "Love Me Down")	Warner Bros. Records	Writer, producer
2015	Andy Grammer	"Good to Be Alive (Hallelujah)"	S-Curve Records	Writer, producer
2015	Plain White T's	American Nights ("You Belong")	Megaforce Records	Writer, producer
2015	Nico & Vinz	Cornerstone ("Our Love")	Warner Records	Writer, producer
2015	Jake Miller	Rumors ("Yellow Lights")	Warner Records	Writer, producer, programmer, instrumentation
2015	Olly Murs	Never Been Better ("Stevie Knows")	Syco Music, Epic Records	Writer, producer
2015	Prince Royce	Double Vision ("Handcuffs")	RCA Records	Writer, producer
2015	Ace Wilder	The Wild Card ("Do U Like")	Warner Records	Writer
2015	Bebe Rexha	"24/7"	Warner Records	Writer
2014	Bella Thorne	Jersey ("Paperweight")	Hollywood Records	Writer, producer
2014	SHINee	I'm Your Boy ("Boys Meet U")	Universal	Writer, programming, instrumentation
2014	Nick Jonas	Nick Jonas ("Nothing Would Be Better," "Wilderness")	Island Records	Producer, writer
2014	Tanner Patrick	The Waiting Home ("Sideways Figure Eights")		Producer, writer, mixer
2014	Jaymes Young	Habits of My Heart ("What Should I Do")	Atlantic Records	Writer
2014	Colton Dixon	Anchor ("Fool's Gold")	Sparrow Records	Writer
2014	iSH	Up & Up ("Light Up" ft. Daniel Richter)	Warner Music Canada	Writer, producer, mixer
2014	Breathe Carolina	Savages (all tracks)	Fearless Records	Producer, engineer, mixer
2014	The Ready Set	The Bad & The Better	Razor and Tie Records	Producer
2013	Simple Plan	Get Your Heart On - The Second Coming! ("Outta My System")	Atlantic Records	Writer, additional producer, additional engineer
2013	Plain White T's	Should've Gone to Bed ("Helium")	Hollywood Records	Writer
2013	Blake Shelton	Based on a True Story... ("Do You Remember")	Warner Bros. Nashville	Writer
2013	The Summer Set	Legendary ("Lightning in a Bottle", "7 Days")	Fearless Records	Writer, producer
2013	Carly Paige	"Too Good", "Tell Me", "It's over Now"		Writer, producer
2013	Kris Allen	"All We Need Is the Love"	RCA Records	Writer
2012	William Beckett	Winds Will Change ("Warriors", "Scarlett (Tokyo)")	YIKE Records	Writer
2012	Breathe Carolina	Punk Goes Pop Volume 5 ("Billie Jean")	Fearless Records	Producer, engineer, mixer
2012	Go Radio	Close the Distance ("Over Me", "Live, Learn, Let Go")	Fearless Records	Writer
2012	GOLDHOUSE	All Night Long (all songs)		Producer, writer, mixer
2011	Breathe Carolina	Hell Is What You Make It (all tracks except "Chemicals")	Fearless Records	Producer, engineer, mixer
2011	Stephen Jerzak	Miles and Miles ("Miles N' Miles", "Cute", "Hot over Summer", "Queen", "She Said" ft. Leighton Meester, "Peace Out")	Universal Republic Records	Producer, writer, engineer
2011	The Ready Set	Feel Good Now	Sire Records	Producer, writer, mixer
2011	Plain White T's	"The House on Shady Lane"	Hollywood Records	Writer, producer
2011	Let's Get It	Masters of the Universe ("Audacity of Dope")	Fearless Records	Writer
2011	Dia Frampton	Red ("Walk Away")	Universal Republic Records	Producer
2011	Young the Giant	Young the Giant	Roadrunner Records	Engineer, additional production
2010	This Century	Hopeful Romantic Sampler ("Young Love")	Sire Records	Writer, producer, mixer
2010	Valencia	Dancing with a Ghost ("Days Go By")	I Surrender Records	Writer
2010	IAMMEDIC	The Tale of Abigale Withers (all songs)	Authentik Artists	Writer, producer, engineer
2010	Breathe Electric	Lovestruck (all songs)		Producer, writer
2010	Almost Alice (Alice in Wonderland soundtrack)	"Welcome to Mystery" (Plain White T's song)	Buena Vista Records	Producer
2010	Artist Vs Poet	Favorite Fix ("Favorite Fix")	Fearless Records	Writer
2010	Neon Trees	Habits ("1983," "Girls and Boys in School" and "In the Next Room")	Mercury Records	Producer, engineer, mixer
2010	Call the Cops	Call the Cops (all songs)	MySpace Records	Writer, producer, engineer
2010	Plain White T's	Wonders of the Younger (all songs)	Hollywood Records	Producer, engineer
2010	The Scissors	You Can Make It Dangerous (all songs)		Mastering
2009	Mitchel Musso	Mitchel Musso ("Hey")	Walt Disney Records	Keyboards, programming, vocal editing
2009	Call the Cops	Motion Sickness (all songs)		Writer, producer, engineer
2009	Bidwell	Something Real (all songs)		Writer, producer
2009	Vogue in the Movement	Vogue in the Movement ("Head over Heels", "Get It", "Attire on Fire", "Guilty Pleasure")		Writer, producer
2009	Sink to See	2012 ("2012")		Writer
2008	Plain White T's	Disneymania 6 ("When I See an Elephant Fly")	Walt Disney Records	Producer, mixer
2008	Them Terribles	Rock, Paper, Terribles (all songs)		Producer
2008	Plain White T's	Big Bad World ("1234," "Natural Disaster")	Hollywood Records	Writer, producer, horn arranger
2007	Stacy Clark	Apples & Oranges (all songs)		Writer, producer, arranger
2006	Stacy Clark	Unusual ("Never")		Writer, producer, arranger
2005	Stephen Cohen, Novica Bozunovich & Ian Kirkpatrick	"Never Get Out Alive" (From the Motion Picture Mortuary)	Swollen Foot Music	Writer, performer

== Awards and nominations ==
=== Grammy Awards ===
Year	Category	Work	Original artist(s)	Result	Ref.
2017	Album of the Year	Purpose	Justin Bieber	Nominated	
2019	Best Engineered Album, Non-Classical	Head over Heels	Chromeo	Nominated	
2021	Record of the Year	"Don't Start Now"	Dua Lipa	Nominated	
2021	Song of the Year	"Don't Start Now"	Dua Lipa	Nominated	
2023	Album of the Year	Special	Lizzo	Nominated	
2025	Album of the Year	Short n' Sweet	Sabrina Carpenter	Nominated	
2025	Best Engineered Album, Non-Classical	Short n' Sweet	Sabrina Carpenter	Nominated	
2025	Best Dance Pop Recording	"Got Me Started"	Troye Sivan	Nominated	
