= If It Ain't Love (disambiguation) =

"If It Ain't Love" is a song by Jason Derulo.

If It Ain't Love may also refer to:

- "If It Ain't Love (Let's Leave It Alone)", a 1972 song by Connie Smith, also covered by The Whites (1985)
- "If It Ain't Love", a 2016 song by K. Michelle from More Issues Than Vogue
