= My Girl (Isabel LaRosa song) =

Single by Isabel LaRosa
- Released: July 25, 2025
- Length: 2:57
- Label: RCA; Slumbo Labs
- Songwriters: Isabel LaRosa; Ari Abdul; Thomas LaRosa
- Producer: Thomas LaRosa

Isabel LaRosa singles chronology
"Cry for You" (2025)	"My Girl" (2025)	"Her Face" (2025)

Lyric video
- Video on YouTube

"My Girl" is a song by Cuban-American singer and songwriter Isabel LaRosa. It was released on July 25, 2025, through RCA Records and Slumbo Labs.

== Background and lyrics ==
"My Girl' was released on July 25, 2025. The lyrics of the song describes LaRosa wanting someone that she can't have and being able to love without caring about consequences. It blends LaRosa's storytelling along with ambient soundscapes and LaRosa's breathy vocals. The song showcases LaRosa in a state of vulnerability.

== Charts ==
Chart performance for "My Girl"
Chart (2025)	Peak position
Lithuania Airplay (TopHit)	90
New Zealand Hot Singles (RMNZ)	38
