= Raven (Isabel LaRosa album) =

Studio album by Isabel LaRosa
- Released: April 18, 2025
- Length: 35:07
- Labels: RCA; Slumbo Labs
- Producers: David Katz; German; Ian Kirkpatrick; Linus; Lucas Sim; Ojivolta; The Monsters & Strangerz; Thomas LaRosa

Isabel LaRosa chronology
You Fear the God That Loves You (2023)	Raven (2025)	Promising Young Woman (2026)

Singles from Raven
- 1. "Favorite" Released: March 29, 2024; 2. "Pretty Boy" Released: August 16, 2024; 3. "Muse" Released: October 18, 2024; 4. "Home" Released: February 14, 2025; 5. "Cry for You" Released: March 21, 2025

Raven is the debut studio album by American singer-songwriter Isabel LaRosa. It was released on April 18, 2025, through RCA Records and Slumbo Labs. The album was supported by several singles: "Favorite", "Pretty Boy", "Muse", "Home" and "Cry for You".

== Background and composition ==
"There's just so much more that goes into putting together an entire body of work… I wanted the order to be really specific".

LaRosa announced her album when she released "Home", on February 14, 2025. The album is about LaRosa's journey from teenager to adulthood. The album talks about heartbreaks and coping with loss, and was described as "sensual yet vulnerable". In an earlier interview with Rolling Stone Australia, when asked about plans for a debut album, LaRosa responded, "Well I have lots of plans for many things. I'm keeping lots of secrets let's just say that."

"The album title Raven represents something deeply personal to me, I've been obsessed with ravens and crows since I was little. There's also a sports team from my hometown in Maryland called the Ravens, so in many ways they represent where I grew up. Raven to me feels like it captures the feeling of the album, which is dark and moody, while still maintaining a personal and emotional aspect. It feels like a perfect representation of me".

In a statement about the album, LaRosa explained the personal significance behind its title, Raven. She expressed a longstanding fascination with ravens and crows, noting that the bird also holds regional importance due to the Baltimore Ravens, a sports team from her hometown in Maryland. According to LaRosa, the title encapsulates the album's overall tone, describing it as "dark and moody," while also maintaining a personal and emotional resonance. She described Raven as "a perfect representation" of herself.

== Promotion ==
To support the album, LaRosa embarked on her headlining Psychopomp Tour, with scheduled performances in cities including Boston, Nashville, Los Angeles, and Dallas. She was also slated to perform at major music festivals such as Lollapalooza in Chicago and Governor's Ball in New York City.

== Critical reception ==
Jason Lipshutz of Billboard praised Raven as a strong debut, noting that LaRosa "makes good on the promise of her early singles." Highlighting her "breathy vocal delivery" and a talent for selecting "propulsive, alternative-leaning production," he wrote that LaRosa distinguishes herself in a crowded pop landscape and "should be moving upward from here."

== Track listing ==
Raven track listing
No.	Title	Writer(s)	Producer(s)	Length
1.	"Famous"	Isabel LaRosa; Thomas LaRosa; Raul Cubina; Mark Williams	Ojivolta; T. LaRosa	2:58
2.	"Good Girl"	I. LaRosa; T. LaRosa	T. LaRosa; Lucas Sim^{[a]}	2:05
3.	"Pretty Boy"	I. LaRosa; T. LaRosa	T. LaRosa	2:03
4.	"Girl of Your Dreams"	I. LaRosa; T. LaRosa; Dave White Tricker; Johnny Medora	T. LaRosa; Sim^{[a]}; Daivd Katz	2:31
5.	"Cry for You"	I. LaRosa; T. LaRosa; Jordan K. Johnson; Stefan Johnson; Delacey; Oliver Peterhof	The Monsters & Strangerz; T. LaRosa; German	2:23
6.	"Home"	I. LaRosa; Ian Kirkpatrick; T. LaRosa	Kirkpatrick; T. LaRosa	2:15
7.	"Hope It Hurts"	I. LaRosa; T. LaRosa; Noonie Bao; Linus Wiklund	Linus; T. LaRosa; Vitals	2:29
8.	"See You Again"	I. LaRosa; Sim	Sim	3:26
9.	"Good for You"	I. LaRosa; T. LaRosa; Amy Allen	T. LaRosa; Sim	2:35
10.	"Favorite"	I. LaRosa; T. LaRosa; Elena Rose	T. LaRosa	2:14
11.	"Muse"	I. LaRosa; T. LaRosa	T. LaRosa; Sim^{[a]}	2:24
12.	"Destroy Myself for You"	I. LaRosa; T. LaRosa; Delacey	T. LaRosa; Sim^{[a]}	2:23
13.	"Piece of My Life"	I. LaRosa; T. LaRosa; Allen	T. LaRosa; Sim^{[a]}	2:53
14.	"Burning"	I. LaRosa; T. LaRosa	T. LaRosa	2:20
Total length:				35:07

=== Notes ===
- ^{^{[a]}} signifies an additional producer.

== Personnel ==
Credits were adapted from Tidal.

- Isabel LaRosa – vocals (all tracks), background vocals (track 1)
- Lucas Sim – mixing, mastering (2–4, 8, 9, 11–14); background vocals, programming (1); guitar (11)
- Jon Castelli – mixing (1)
- Thomas LaRosa – mixing (4, 6, 8, 10), mastering (6, 10)
- Mitch McCarthy – mixing (5, 7)
- Dave Kutch – mastering (1, 5, 7)
- Ojivolta – background vocals, drums, guitar, piano, programming (1)

== Certifications ==
Certifications for Raven
Region	Certification	Certified units/sales
Brazil (Pro-Música Brasil)	Gold	20,000^{‡}
^{‡} Sales+streaming figures based on certification alone.
