= Tanner Patrick =

American singer-songwriter

- Born: Tanner Patrick Howe; May 24, 1991 (age 35); Los Angeles, CA
- Genres: Rock/pop, pop, acoustic
- Occupations: Singer, songwriter, musician, producer
- Instruments: Vocals, acoustic guitar, electric guitar, bass guitar, piano, saxophone
- Years active: 2008/2009–present
- Label: Tanner Patrick LLC
- Formerly of: Disco Curtis

Tanner Patrick Howe (born May 24, 1991) is an American singer-songwriter and multi-instrumentalist from Dallas, Texas. In August 2011, Howe began uploading videos to his YouTube channel and was selected by Nigel Lythgoe Productions to star in Opening Act shortly after. In April 2014, he released his debut album The Waiting Home. Around this time, Howe also began uploading videos to Vine.

== Early life ==
Tanner Patrick Howe was born in Los Angeles, California on May 24, 1991.

At the age of 17, Howe was diagnosed with Type 1 diabetes. Following his diagnosis, he founded the band Disco Curtis with longtime friends Garrett Perales and AJ Novak. After gaining popularity through independent touring, the band signed a record deal with MySpace Records{{Citation needed}}, joined the 2010 Vans Warped Tour, performed at Bamboozle West{{Citation needed}} and played shows with Boys Like Girls and Forever The Sickest Kids.

Upon the conclusion of the Warped Tour, Tanner announced Disco Curtis' disbandment, as the other members were leaving the band to focus on their university studies.{{Citation needed}} Shortly after, Tanner moved to Los Angeles to write, refocus, and demo new songs as a solo artist.

== Music career ==
After several months of working with various producers around the Los Angeles area, Patrick moved back to Dallas to continue writing and producing demos on his own. In spring 2011, Tanner tweeted that he had written and demoed more than 80 songs over the past six months.

On July 23, 2011, Tanner announced the official beginning of "Tanner Patrick" via live web chat.{{citation needed|date=January 2023}} That following month, he uploaded an introduction video to launch his YouTube channel. In September 2011, he posted his first cover video to YouTube. Less than 3 months after uploading his first video, his YouTube channel had received over 3,000,000 total views. On December 8, Patrick released the teaser video for his debut single, "Merry Go Round". Soon thereafter, he performed his debut show at Centennial Hall in Fair Park in December 2011 with All Time Low and The Maine as part of the Unsilent Night Music Festival. On April 10, 2012, Patrick released the video for his debut single, "Merry Go Round", which received over 1.6 million views.

In mid-2012, he was selected by Nigel Lythgoe as one of eight artists to be featured on E!'s "Opening Act" where he shared the stage with country superstars, Brad Paisley and The Band Perry. His appearance on the show included a session with Nick Jonas and the recording of an original song (written by Keith Urban and Darrell Brown) at the Capitol Records Recording Studio. After his television debut, he was hired to write, produce, and record the original song, "Progress" and play the lead role in Logitech's new advertisement campaign. He successfully completed the project in the first quarter of 2013. A few months later, Patrick made his international debut, performing as a featured artist on the "YouTube Sensations: Under The Stars Concert" at The Coliseum in Singapore.

Patrick recently completed writing and recording his debut album, "The Waiting Home", produced by Carlos de la Garza (Paramore, M83, Young The Giant), Ian Kirkpatrick (Blake Shelton, Breathe Carolina, Plain White T's), Mark Maxwell (producer) (3OH!3, Boys Like Girls) and Grant Harris aka Goldhouse. On the day of its release, the album charted in the iTunes Top 200 albums in multiple countries.

As a songwriter, Tanner has co-written with several accomplished songwriters including, Jimmy Harry, Tim Myers, Damon Sharpe, Cisco Adler, Ian Kirkpatrick, Matt Squire, and RedOne Productions.

== Music style and influence ==
Tanner's music has been influenced by Chris Carrabba (Dashboard Confessional, Twin Forks), Max Bemis (Say Anything), Kenny Vasoli (The Starting Line, Person L, Vacationer), Adam Young (Owl City), Mark Hoppus and his favorite film, Fight Club.

== Discography ==
=== LPs ===
Year	Title	Label	Chart Positions	
Year	Title	Label	Top 200	US Heat
2014	The Waiting Home	Tanner Patrick		
2024	The Vintage Vault	Tanner Patrick		

=== Singles ===
Year	Title	Label	Chart Positions	
Year	Title	Label	Top 200	US Pop
2012	Merry Go Round	Tanner Patrick		
2013	Sideways Figure Eights	Tanner Patrick		
2014	Satellites	Tanner Patrick		
2017	I Want To	Tanner Patrick		
2024	Ready or Not	Tanner Patrick		
2024	Running Away	Tanner Patrick		
2024	Flatline	Tanner Patrick		
2024	Reasons	Tanner Patrick		
2024	Breaking Up	Tanner Patrick		
