= Older (Isabel LaRosa song) =

Single by Isabel LaRosa
- Released: September 15, 2023
- Length: 2:17
- Label: RCA; Slumbo Labs
- Songwriters: Thomas LaRosa; Isabel LaRosa
- Producer: Thomas LaRosa

Isabel LaRosa singles chronology
"Eyes Don't Lie" (2023)	"Older" (2023)	"Favorite" (2024)

Music video
- "Older" on YouTube

"Older" (stylised in all lower case) is a song released by Cuban-American singer and songwriter Isabel LaRosa on September 15, 2023, through RCA Records and Slumbo Labs.

== Background and promotion ==
The song has been described as an "addictive alt-pop song which draws you in with its sultry sound and heavy instrumentals" by Pop Passion. LaRosa's vocals has also been described as "airy and sultry". Lyrically, the song is about wanting to be with a more colder and older man. On September 29, the music video for the song was released.

== Chart performance ==
"Older" entered Germany's GfK Entertainment charts and New Zealand's Official Aotearoa Music Charts, peaking at 100 and 16 respectively.

== Certifications ==
Certifications for "Older"
Region	Certification	Certified units/sales
Austria (IFPI Austria)	Gold	15,000^{‡}
Hungary (MAHASZ)	Platinum	4,000^{‡}
New Zealand (RMNZ)	Gold	15,000^{‡}
Poland (ZPAV)	Platinum	50,000^{‡}
United Kingdom (BPI)	Silver	200,000^{‡}
^{‡} Sales+streaming figures based on certification alone.
