= Home (Isabel LaRosa song) =

Single by Isabel LaRosa

from the album Raven
- Released: February 14, 2025
- Length: 2:16
- Label: RCA; Slumbo Labs
- Songwriters: Isabel LaRosa; Thomas LaRosa; Ian Kirkpatrick
- Producers: Ian Kirkpatrick; Thomas LaRosa

Isabel LaRosa singles chronology
"Muse" (2024)	"Home" (2025)	"Cry for You" (2025)

Lyric video
- "Home" on YouTube

"Home" is a song released by Cuban-American singer and songwriter Isabel LaRosa on February 14, 2025, through RCA Records and Slumbo Labs, serving as the fourth single from her debut album Raven.

== Background and lyrics ==
"Home" talks about nostalgia and not wanting to leave a familiar place, featuring LaRosa's emotionally charged lyrics with her unique storytelling and dreamy instrumentals. It also talks about her sister as well and being protective of her.
