= I'm Yours (Isabel LaRosa song) =

Single by Isabel LaRosa
- Released: October 28, 2022
- Length: 2:25
- Label: RCA; Slumbo Labs
- Songwriters: Isabel LaRosa; Thomas LaRosa
- Producer: Thomas LaRosa

Isabel LaRosa singles chronology
"Heartbeat" (2022)	"I'm Yours" (2022)	"Eyes Don't Lie" (2023)

Music video
- "I'm Yours" on YouTube

"I'm Yours" (stylized in all lower case) is a song by Cuban-American singer and songwriter Isabel LaRosa. It was released on October 28, 2022, through RCA Records and Slumbo Labs. The song had appeared on international music charts and streamed more than 420 million times on Spotify. "I'm Yours" peaked number 84 on UK Singles Chart and number 10 on Sweden.

== Background and composition ==
LaRosa stated in an interview that she wrote the song to give the listener a feeling to lower their inhibitions. Lyrically, the song talks about the feeling of liking someone and expressing interest in being with them.

== Music video ==
LaRosa released a music video for the song in December 2022. The video reached over 1.5 million likes on YouTube.

== Personnel ==
Credits were adapted from Tidal.

- Isabel LaRosa – composer, lyricist, performer
- Thomas LaRosa – producer, composer, mastering, mixing, recording engineer

== Charts ==
"I'm Yours" chart performance
Chart	Peak position
Lithuania (AGATA)	88
New Zealand (Recorded Music NZ)	19
Sweden (Sverigetopplistan)	10
UK Singles (OCC)	84
US Bubbling Under Hot 100 (Billboard)	22
US Global 200 (Billboard)	133

== Certifications ==
"I'm Yours" certifications
Region	Certification	Certified units/sales
Austria (IFPI Austria)	Gold	15,000^{‡}
New Zealand (RMNZ)	4× Gold	60,000^{‡}
United Kingdom (BPI)	Silver	200,000^{‡}
United States (RIAA)	Platinum	1,000,000^{‡}
^{‡} Sales+streaming figures based on certification alone.
