= Pretty Boy (song) =

Single by Isabel LaRosa

from the album Raven
- Released: August 16, 2024
- Length: 2:03
- Label: RCA; Slumbo Labs
- Songwriters: Isabel LaRosa; Thomas LaRosa
- Producers: Thomas LaRosa; Lucas Sim

Isabel LaRosa singles chronology
| "Favorite" (2024) | "Pretty Boy" (2024) | "Muse" (2024) |

Audio video
- "Pretty Boy" on YouTube

"Pretty Boy" is a song released by American singer and songwriter Isabel LaRosa on August 16, 2024, through RCA Records and Slumbo Labs. It is the second single from her debut studio album, Raven.

== Background and lyrics ==
Before the song's official release, a viral clip of circulated on social media and had over 24K creates on TikTok. The lyrics of the song describes LaRosa's desire to be possessive over the person she loves. Clash described the song as an electropop song where LaRosa pleads for a second chance with her lost lover.
