= Isabel LaRosa =

American singer-songwriter (born 2004)

- LaRosa at the 2024 MTV Video Music Awards

Background information
- Born: Isabel Sofia LaRosa; September 18, 2004 (age 22); Annapolis, Maryland, U.S
- Genres: Alt-pop; dark pop; electropop
- Occupations: Singer; songwriter
- Years active: 2021–present
- Labels: RCA; Slumbo Labs
- Website: isabel-larosa.com

Isabel Sofia LaRosa (born September 18, 2004), is a Cuban-American singer, songwriter and video director from Annapolis, Maryland. She signed to RCA Records in 2021 and released her debut EP, I'm Watching You, in 2022. She rose to prominence after releasing her 2022 single "I'm Yours", which went viral on the social media platform TikTok. Her debut studio album, Raven, was released on April 18, 2025.

== Life ==
Isabel Sofia LaRosa was born in the US, Annapolis, MD to a Cuban mother and an American father. She is Cuban-American and grew up with music around her from a young age, attending jazz clubs with her father where he played the saxophone, her brother playing the guitar, and she singing alongside them. Isabel started writing songs with her brother, Thomas LaRosa, while she was in elementary school which led them to form a creative duo. They co-write all of her musics, while Thomas produces them.

== Career ==
=== 2021–2022: Debut and "I'm Yours" ===
On September 8, 2021, Isabel LaRosa released her debut single "16 Candles". She released the following singles in 2021, "Closer" and "Gameboy". On January 26, 2022, LaRosa released the single "Therapy". The next month, she released the single "Haunted", the lead single from her debut EP, I'm Watching You. The song was released alongside her first music video, which served as the first part of a three part series which together form a short film. The EP's second single, "Help", was released on April 15, 2022. I'm Watching You was released on June 24, alongside a short film written and co-directed by LaRosa herself. Another single, "Heartbeat" was released on August 26. LaRosa also co-wrote three songs from label-mate Ari Abdul's EP, Fallen Angel. On October 28, LaRosa released the single "I'm Yours", which became her breakthrough song after going viral on TikTok. It was released alongside a sped up version of the song and the music video released on November 11. On December 13, it was announced that she would be the opening act for Nessa Barrett's Young Forever Tour.

=== 2023–present: Commercial success of "Favorite", Raven, and Promising Young Woman ===
On March 24, 2023, LaRosa released her second extended play, You Fear the God That Loves You. On September 13, she released the song "Older". In January 2024, Ari Abdul announced that she would perform God's Watching Tour with LaRosa. On March 29, she released the single "Favorite". Before its official release, it gained more than 400 million views from the content which some users had created in social media. LaRosa announced Heaven Doesn't Wait Tour in April, starting at Glasgow, UK on October 21 and concluding at Köle, DE on November 7. On June 7, she released the music video for "Favorite". In September, LaRosa announced additional Australian set for Heaven Doesn't Wait Tour, set to begin in February 2025.

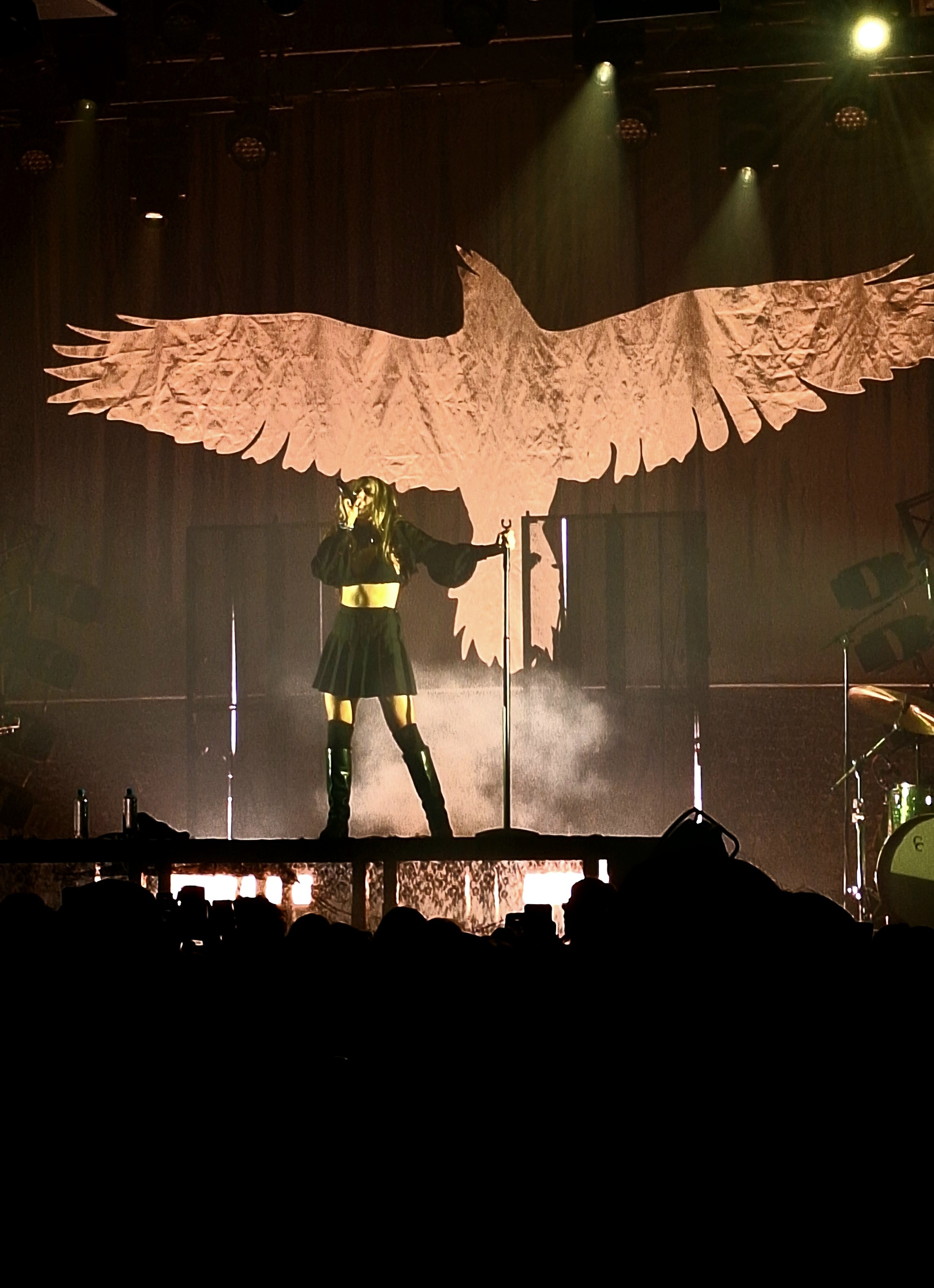
LaRosa at Psychopomp Tour, performing at Melkweg in Amsterdam, Netherlands

She announced her debut studio album, Raven, on February 14, 2025, the same day she released the single "Home". She also performed the tour, titled Psychopomp Tour, from April 18 at the Observatory North Park to May 23 at Belasco Theatre. She later released her single "Cry for You" on March 21, 2025, and announced that Raven would be released on April 18, 2025. On July 25, she released "My Girl". In the summer of 2025, she performed on the main stage of both the Governors Ball in New York City, and Sziget Festival in Budapest, Hungary. In 2026, it was announced that LaRosa would support American singer Madison Beer's tour, the Locket Tour, from May 11 to May 31. She will perform on its European and UK tour. She also released her single "Hallucination" and announced a new EP called Promising Young Woman. Same year, it was announced that Larosa will be an opener for English singer Artemas, in his upcoming tour, Lovecore tour. In June, she released her EP, Promising Young Woman. She also co-wrote "Still" by Karol G which was released in August along with Karol, Bruno Mars, Sasha Alex Sloan, and her brother, Thomas LaRosa.

== Artistry ==
LaRosa wrote the treatments and co-directed each visual for her debut EP, I'm Watching You. The music video for "I'm Yours" was written and directed by LaRosa herself. Her music has been described as being alt-pop, dark pop, and electropop.

== Discography ==
=== Studio albums ===
List of studio albums, with selected details
| Title | Album details |
|---|---|
| Raven | Released: April 18, 2025; Label: RCA, Slumbo Labs; Format: Digital download, streaming |

=== Extended plays ===
List of extended plays, with selected details
| Title | Extended play details |
|---|---|
| I'm Watching You | Released: June 24, 2022; Label: RCA, Slumbo Labs; Format: Digital download, streaming |
| You Fear the God That Loves You | Released: March 24, 2023; Label: RCA, Slumbo Labs; Format: Digital download, streaming |
| Promising Young Woman | Released: June 5, 2026; Label: RCA, Slumbo Labs; Format: Digital download, streaming |

=== Singles ===
List of singles as lead artist, with selected chart positions and certifications
| Title | Year | Peak chart positions | | | | | | | | | | Certifications | Album |
| Title | Year | US Bub. | US Pop | AUT | GER | LTU | NZ Hot | SWE Heat. | SWI | UK | WW | Certifications | Album |
|---|---|---|---|---|---|---|---|---|---|---|---|---|---|
| "16 Candles" | 2021 | — | — | — | — | — | — | — | — | — | — | | Non-album singles |
| "Closer" | 2021 | — | — | — | — | — | — | — | — | — | — | | Non-album singles |
| "Gameboy" | 2021 | — | — | — | — | — | — | — | — | — | — | | Non-album singles |
| "Therapy" | 2022 | — | — | — | — | — | — | — | — | — | — | | Non-album singles |
| "Haunted" | 2022 | — | — | — | — | — | — | — | — | — | — | | I'm Watching You |
| "Help" | 2022 | — | — | — | — | — | — | — | — | — | — | | I'm Watching You |
| "Heartbeat" | 2022 | — | — | — | — | — | — | — | — | — | — | | Non-album singles |
| "I'm Yours" | 2022 | 22 | — | — | — | 88 | 19 | 10 | — | 84 | 133 | RIAA: Platinum; BPI: Silver; IFPI AUT: Gold; RMNZ: Gold | Non-album singles |
| "Eyes Don't Lie" | 2023 | — | — | — | — | — (Note: "Eyes Don't Lie" did not enter the AGATA Singlų Top 100, but peaked at number 76 on the TopHit Lithuanian Airplay.) | — | — | — | — | — | | Non-album singles |
| "Older" | 2023 | — | — | — | 100 | — | 16 | — | — | — | — | BPI: Silver; IFPI AUT: Gold; RMNZ: Gold | Non-album singles |
| "Favorite" | 2024 | — | 26 | 58 | 68 | — | 19 | — | 83 | — | 120 | | Raven |
| "Pretty Boy" | 2024 | — | — | — | — | — | — | — | — | — | — | | Raven |
| "Muse" | 2024 | — | — | — | — | — | — | — | — | — | — | | Raven |
| "Home" | 2025 | — | — | — | — | — | — | — | — | — | — | | Raven |
| "Cry for You" | 2025 | — | — | — | — | — | — | — | — | — | — | | Raven |
| "My Girl" | 2025 | — | — | — | — | — (Note: "My Girl" did not enter the AGATA Singlų Top 100, but peaked at number 90 on the TopHit Lithuanian Airplay.) | 38 | — | — | — | — | | Non-album single |
| "Her Face" | 2025 | — | — | — | — | — (Note: "Her Face" did not enter the AGATA Singlų Top 100, but peaked at number 76 on the TopHit Lithuanian Airplay.) | — | — | — | — | — | | Non-album single |
| "Hallucination" | 2026 | — | — | — | — | — | — | — | — | — | — | | Promising Young Woman |
"—" denotes a recording that did not chart or was not released in that territory.

=== Other charted songs ===
List of other charted songs with selected chart positions
| Title | Year | Peak chart positions | Album |
| Title | Year | LAT Air. | Album |
|---|---|---|---|
| "Hope It Hurts" | 2025 | 14 | Raven |

== Tours ==
=== Headlining ===
- God's Watching Tour (with Ari Abdul) (2024)
- Heaven Doesn't Wait Tour (2024–2025)
- Psychopomp Tour (2025)
- Dollparts Tour (2026)

=== Supporting act ===
- Young Forever Tour (Nessa Barrett) (2023)
- The Locket Tour (Madison Beer) (2026)
- Hades: The Sacrifice Tour (Melanie Martinez) (2026)
