= Favorite (Isabel LaRosa song) =

Single by Isabel LaRosa

from the album Raven
- Released: March 29, 2024
- Length: 2:13
- Label: RCA; Slumbo Labs
- Songwriters: Elena Rose; Thomas LaRosa; Isabel LaRosa
- Producer: Thomas LaRosa

Isabel LaRosa singles chronology
"Older" (2023)	"Favorite" (2024)	"Pretty Boy" (2024)

Music video
- "Favorite" on YouTube

"Favorite" is a song released by American singer-songwriter and video director Isabel LaRosa on March 29, 2024, through RCA Records and Slumbo Labs, as the lead single from her debut studio album, Raven.

== Background and promotion ==
Before the official release of "Favorite", a clip of the song was used in over 80K creations across different social media platforms with over 400 million views. The song explores about to be someone's desire and yearning to be the center of their affection. It features both Spanish and English lyrics.

On June 8, 2024, she revealed her music video for "Favorite", which was directed by her and featured Ethan Cutkosky.

== Charts performance ==
In the United States, "Favorite" peaked at No. 26 on the Billboard Pop Airplay chart. It charted in various other countries such as Austria's singles chart at 58, Germany's GfK Entertainment charts at 68, New Zealand's official music chart at 19, Switzerland's official music chart at 83, and worldwide on the Billboard Global 200 at 120.
