= Promising Young Woman (EP) =

2026 EP by Isabel LaRosa

EP by Isabel LaRosa
- Released: June 26, 2026
- Length: 21:21
- Labels: RCA; Slumbo Labs
- Producers: Thomas LaRosa; TimFromTheHouse; Albin Clern; Tommy English; Zhone

Isabel LaRosa chronology
Raven (2025)	Promising Young Woman (2026)

Singles from Promising Young Woman
- 1. "Hallucination" Released: May 1, 2026

Promising Young Woman is the third extended play (EP) by American singer and songwriter Isabel LaRosa. It was released on June 26, 2026, through RCA Records and Slumbo Labs. The EP was supported by the only single "Hallucination".

== Background and composition ==
"This project touches a lot on self-imposed pressure, feeling like you're living up to your own potential. Issues with self-esteem and the way it plays out in relationships. The name is almost comical to me."

LaRosa announced she would be releasing her EP, after its lead single "Hallucination" was released on May 1, 2026.

The EP has six tracks; which explores the feeling of losing yourself while listening to it. The EP romanticises love while recognizing its potential for destruction.

== Promotion ==
To promote the EP, LaRosa has embarked on Melanie Martinez's HADES: The Sacrifice Tour as an opening act.

== Track listing ==
Promising Young Woman track listing
No.	Title	Writer(s)	Producer(s)	Length
1.	"The Things That I Would Do To Be Enough For You"	Isabel LaRosa; Thomas LaRosa; Tim Nelson; Albin Clern; Chloe Angelides	T. LaRosa; Clern; TimFromTheHouse	2:46
2.	"Hallucination"	I. LaRosa; T. LaRosa; Tommy English; Kristine Flaherty	T. LaRosa; English	3:22
3.	"Hate Myself For Loving You"	I. LaRosa; T. LaRosa; Kevin Hickey; Sasha Alex Sloan	T. LaRosa; Zhone	3:02
4.	"Every Life"	I. LaRosa; T. LaRosa	T. LaRosa	3:18
5.	"Porcelain"	I. LaRosa; T. LaRosa; English; Flaherty	T. LaRosa; English	2:48
6.	"Claw Marks"	I. LaRosa; T. LaRosa	T. LaRosa	2:51
7.	"American Wedding"	I. LaRosa; T. LaRosa	T. LaRosa	3:10
Total length:				21:21
