= Close the Distance =

Studio album by Go Radio
- Released: September 18, 2012
- Recorded: Early 2012
- Genre: Pop rock
- Length: 42:09
- Label: Fearless
- Producer: James Paul Wisner

Go Radio chronology
Lucky Street (2011)	Close the Distance (2012)

Singles from Close the Distance
- 1. "Go to Hell" Released: August 7, 2012

Close the Distance is the second and final studio album by American rock band Go Radio. It was released on September 18, 2012, through record label Fearless Records. Guitarist Alex Reed was located in Philadelphia, while the remainder of Go Radio was in Florida. They sent each other song ideas, before meeting up, and working on the songs for several weeks. In early 2012, the band recorded their next album with producer James Paul Wisner. Described as a pop rock album, Close the Distance was compared to Counting Crows.

Preceded by a headlining US tour, "Go to Hell" was released as the lead single in August 2012, with its music video following later in the month. To promote the album, the band went on two further headlining US tours until the end of the year. In 2013, they had a support slot for the Summer Set, and appeared on that year's Warped Tour, prior to breaking up.

Close the Distance received generally positive reviews from music critics, some of whom commented on frontman Jason Lancaster's vocals, and its pop rock sound. In the US, the album peaked at number 54 on the Billboard 200, as well as charting highly on three Billboard component charts, Alternative Albums, Independent Albums, and Rock Albums.

== Background and production ==
In the early stages of writing for a new album, guitarist Alex Reed was in Philadelphia while the remainder of Go Radio were based across Florida. The band built upon ideas and wrote individually before sending the ideas over email; this process lasted around a month. They later met up again in Tallahassee, Florida in a home studio and evolved the ideas into songs. They did this ten hours a day, six days a week for four weeks straight. Pre-production followed a month later with James Paul Wisner, where they whittled down 35 demos to 11 for the final album. In January 2012, the band entered the studio to start work on Close the Distance. They worked on one song at a time, and moved on to another when the preceding one was completed. They decided to follow this method after seeing documentaries on U2 and Foo Fighters working on their albums.

Opting away from the large guitar sounds of their contemporaries, the band brought in different amps and guitars, and aimed on getting purer tones. In late February, three-quarters through the sessions, the band started working with instrument manufacturer New Vintage Amps, and upon them sending a test model amplifier to the band, they started re-recording a number of sections. Reed played a Gibson Les Paul Standard guitar through a New Vintage H&B 50 amp, which was connected to a New Vintage 4x12 cabinet. Lancaster played various Fender and Gibson guitars, also through a New Vintage H&B 50 amp. Wisner mixed all of the recordings except for "I Won't Lie" and "Go to Hell", which were done by Mark Endert.

== Composition ==
Close the Distance has been described as a pop rock release, with elements of indie folk, and drew comparisons to Counting Crows. The record is more piano-and-string focused, which Reed attributed to his classical musician parents and orchestra teachers growing up. All of the songs were written by Go Radio, with the exception of "The Ending" (co-written with Mike Jansen) and "Hear Me Out" (co-written with Ian Kirkpatrick). It continues the lyric themes found on Lucky Street, which centred around events in the band members' day-to-day lives, but with the added concept of hope. Lancaster found it stressful working on "Baltimore", adding that he felt the song wasn't "'finished,' because I was always scared of cutting it short and not doing it justice." It features a lighter pop soundscape while retaining the high energy of the previous track, and showcases Lancaster's vocal abilities. The guitar riff in "Collide" was one of the first pieces written for the album, having its origins during the Lucky Street sessions.

"Go to Hell" was one of the last tracks written for the album, and the easiest written for it overall. It starts with Lancaster's vocal and a piano, before changing tempos and incorporated guitars. Most of "Lost and Found" was written by guitarist Alex Reed after returning from a trip to Philadelphia, Pennsylvania. According to Lancaster, the album's title-track is an accumulation of the previous year for the band. "What If You Don't" talks about moving with one's life and looking forward to the future. It consists of piano, vocals, and a violin played by Sean Mackin of Yellowcard. "Over Me" was one of the first tracks the band worked on in the studio, collectively spending four days on it, before scrapping it and starting again. Lancaster said "Hear Me Out" initially started as a tribute to Reed's grandmother who had died recently, before evolving into "something that we're all emotionally attached to." It opens with an acoustic guitar, before building with a piano into a full-band sound; it was compared to one of the band's earlier tracks "Goodnight Moon".

== Release ==
Between March and May 2012, Go Radio embarked on a headlining US tour, dubbed the Lucky Street Tour. They were supported by There for Tomorrow, Tyler Carter, Simple as Surgery, Ivory Lights and This Providence. On April 20, Close the Distance was announced for release in August. On July 12, it was pushed back from its original date to September as the band wanted to "make sure everything was as perfect as we know you guys deserve." Four days later, the album's artwork was released, designed by Alex Sheldon at Match & Kerosene studio. On July 17, a teaser video was released; after it was shared 20,000 times, "Collide" was premiered through Alternative Press's website the following day. A lyric video for the song premiered through AbsolutePunk at the end of the month. "Go to Hell" was released as a single on August 7.

A music video for "Go to Hell" premiered through Entertainment Weekly on August 29, 2012. The clips sees a man running through Los Angeles, California's public transport system to meet his partner. In September and October, the band went on a US tour. On September 13, the entire album was streamed on Billboard's website, before being released on September 18 through independent record label Fearless Records. The iTunes deluxe edition included "If That’s Tonight", "Live, Learn, Let Go", and acoustic versions of "Go to Hell" and "I Won't Lie" as bonus tracks. "Go to Hell" was released to alternative radio on October 16. In November and December, the band went on the #GoToHell Tour in the US with Paradise Fears and Stages & Stereos. In February and March 2013, the band supported the Summer Set on their headlining US tour. Following this, the band performed on the 2013 Warped Tour, before breaking up in October.

== Reception ==
Professional ratings
Aggregate scores
Source	Rating
Metacritic	74/100
Review scores
Source	Rating
AbsolutePunk	90%
AllMusic	3/5 stars
idobi	3/5
Melodic	3.5/5 stars
Rock Sound	6/10 stars
Sputnikmusic	3/5

Close the Distance was met with generally positive reviews from music critics. At Metacritic, the album received an average score of 74, based on 4 reviews.

AbsolutePunk staff member Ryan Gardner said Close the Distance was the album that "defines Go Radio as a band deserving of stardom." He noted that that pushed past the two extremes of Lucky Street, "gritty pop-punk ... and mid-tempo rockers", in favor of "solely mid-tempo pop-rock." Melodic's Pär Winberg called it "a good album" that had "a lot of great melodies and a nice solid production" from Wisner. The album's music had "a twist of a more bombastic edge" with Lancaster's piano work. AllMusic reviewer Gregory Heaney said Lucky Street "felt like the promise", and with Close the Distance, Go Radio "makes good on that promise." He found the album to have a "mellow, more plaintive vibe" than Lucky Street, "attempting to wash over listeners rather than simply bowl them over."

Rock Sound writer Andy Ritchie wrote that Lancaster's vocals were "again the focal point, draping itself across a background of super-American piano rock," with the "gentler moments" being where the band "really excel." idobi's Tori Bilcik wrote that the record "still makes for a solid, lighter pop rock album that fans of a variety of different music can enjoy." The frequency of Lancaster's piano "not only ties the tracks together but also ties the album together with their past releases, and the band also maintain their traditionally powerful lyrics." Sputnikmusic staff member Atari said Close the Distance didn't measure up to Lucky Street, with Lancaster's voice aiding in "carry[ing] the album even through its weaker moments." It wasn't "as consistent or as enjoyable as its predecessor," while there was a few "outstanding" tracks, the filler songs "in between keep it from reaching its true potential."

Commercially, Close the Distance reached number 54 on the US Billboard 200. It appeared on three other Billboard component charts: number 12 on Independent Albums, number 13 on Alternative Albums, and number 22 on Rock Albums.

== Track listing ==
All songs written by Go Radio, except where noted. All recordings produced by James Paul Wisner.

Close the Distance standard edition
No.	Title	Writer(s)	Length
1.	"I Won't Lie"		3:38
2.	"Baltimore"		3:55
3.	"Collide"		3:34
4.	"Go to Hell"		3:29
5.	"Lost and Found"		3:23
6.	"Close the Distance"		4:01
7.	"What If You Don't"		3:50
8.	"Things I Don't See"		3:51
9.	"The Ending"	Go Radio; Mike Jansen	3:43
10.	"Over Me"	Go Radio; Ian Kirkpatrick	3:51
11.	"Hear Me Out"		4:55
Total length:			42:09

iTunes deluxe edition
No.	Title	Length
12.	"If That's Tonight"	3:59
13.	"Live, Learn, Let Go"	3:09
14.	"Go to Hell" (piano version)	3:35
15.	"I Won't Lie" (acoustic)	3:48
Total length:		56:31

== Personnel ==
Personnel per booklet.

Go Radio

- Jason Lancaster – lead vocals, rhythm guitar
- Alex Reed – lead guitar, vocals
- Matt "Burns" Poulos – bass guitar, backing vocals
- Steven Kopacz – drums, backing vocals

Additional musicians

- Sean Mackin – violin (track 7)

Production and design

- James Paul Wisner – recording, producer, mixing (except tracks 1 and 4)
- Mark Endert – mixing (tracks 1 and 4)
- Alex Sheldon – design

== Charts ==
Chart performance for Close the Distance
Chart (2012)	Peak position
US Billboard 200	54
US Top Alternative Albums (Billboard)	13
US Independent Albums (Billboard)	12
US Top Rock Albums (Billboard)	22
