= Muse (Isabel LaRosa song) =

Single by Isabel LaRosa

from the album Raven
- Released: October 18, 2024
- Length: 2:24
- Label: RCA; Slumbo Labs
- Songwriters: Thomas LaRosa; Isabel LaRosa
- Producer: Thomas LaRosa

Isabel LaRosa singles chronology
"Pretty Boy" (2024)	"Muse" (2024)	"Home" (2024)

Lyric video
- "Muse" on YouTube

"Muse" is a song released by American singer and songwriter Isabel LaRosa on October 18, 2024, through RCA Records and Slumbo Labs, as the third single from her debut studio album, Raven.

== Background and promotion ==
LaRosa teased a snippet of "Muse" on her social media ten months prior to the official release of it. The snippet of the song started to rack up numbers as many people made videos using the sound.

== Composition ==
Cage Riot described the song as an alt-pop anthem with dark, haunting lyricism and magnetic sonics. The song explores themes of infatuation and admiration.
