= Kiss the Sky (Jason Derulo song) =

Single by Jason Derulo

from the album Platinum Hits
- Released: July 29, 2016
- Recorded: 2016
- Genre: Pop; funk
- Length: 3:42
- Label: Beluga Heights; Warner Bros.
- Songwriters: Thomas Troelsen; Sam Martin; Bonnie McKee; Jason Desrouleaux; Madison Love; Michael Caren; Terius Nash
- Producers: Thomas Troelsen; Thomas Eriksen

Jason Derulo singles chronology
"If It Ain't Love" (2016)	"Kiss the Sky" (2016)	"Swalla" (2017)

"Kiss the Sky" is a song by the American singer and songwriter Jason Derulo from his first greatest hits album, Platinum Hits. It was released as the album's lead single on July 19, 2016. It was also originally intended to appear on the soundtrack of the 2016 animated film Storks, but did not eventually make it on the album, despite being featured in the film. "Kiss the Sky" was written by Thomas Troelsen, Bonnie McKee, Jason Derulo, Madison Love, Michael Caren, and Terius Nash, and it was produced by Thomas Troelsen and Thomas Eriksen.

== Composition ==
"Kiss the Sky" is a pop song with includes funk influences and "a roving bass line".

== Live performances ==
On August 5, 2016, Derulo performed "Kiss the Sky" on The Tonight Show Starring Jimmy Fallon with The Roots as backing band.

== Music video ==
The video features Derulo and his friends partying and dancing in a hotel that appears to be in Miami, his home town. Derulo has a Haitian flag tied around his leg. The video concludes with a large, poolside dance scene at the aforementioned hotel.

== Personnel ==
- Bonnie McKee – songwriting
- Jason Derulo – songwriting, vocals
- Madison Love – songwriting
- Michael Caren – songwriting
- Terius Nash – songwriting
- Thomas Troelsen – songwriting, additional vocals, instruments, producer
- Thomas Eriksen – producer
- Chuck Gibson – guitar
- David Parks – bass
- Jonny Sjo – bass guitar
- Nate Merchant – backing vocals, vocal producer
- Sam Martin – backing vocals, vocal producer
- Connor Martin – backing vocals
- Jeremy Strong – backing vocals
- Joy Martin – backing vocals
- Olly Sheppard – backing vocals
- Sean "Movie" Charles – backing vocals
- Andre Tyler – backing vocals
- Gustav Rasmussen – trombone
- Ketil Duckert – trumpet
- Thomas Edinger – saxophone
- Frank Ramirez – engineer
- Jeff Jackson – engineer
- Josh Ra Collins – engineer
- Lorenzo Cardona – engineer
- Robin Florent – engineer
- Sasha Sirota – engineer
- Manny Marroquin – mixer
- Chris Galland – mix engineer
- Chris Gehringer – mastering

== Charts ==
Chart performance for "Kiss the Sky"
Chart (2016–2017)	Peak position
Belgium (Ultratip Bubbling Under Flanders)	43
Belgium Urban (Ultratop Flanders)	31
Belgium (Ultratip Bubbling Under Wallonia)	50
Netherlands (Dutch Top 40)	31
Netherlands (Single Top 100)	96
New Zealand Heatseekers (Recorded Music NZ)	9
Scottish Singles Sales (Official Charts)	38
Spain (Promusicae)	31
UK Singles (Official Charts)	87

== Certifications ==
Certifications for "Kiss the Sky"
Region	Certification	Certified units/sales
Italy (FIMI)	Gold	25,000^{‡}
^{‡} Sales+streaming figures based on certification alone.
