= IAMMEDIC =

Electropop band

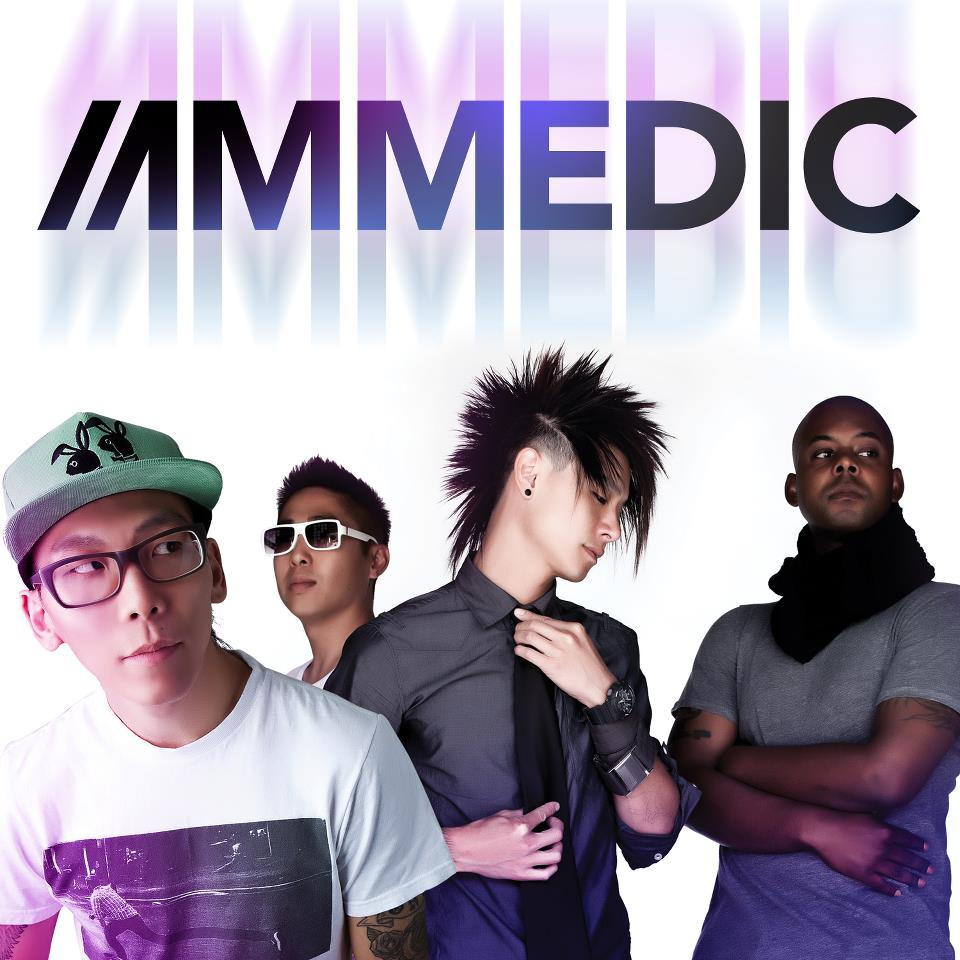
- From left : DJ Yup, Danny, Enik, Andre

Background information
- Genre: Glitch / Electro / Pop
- Years active: 2010–2018
- Label: Authentik Artists (2010–2011)
- Members: Enik Lin; Danny Park; Andre Harris; DJ Yup
- Website: iammedic.com

IAMMEDIC was an electropop band originally formed in 2010 by leader, Enik Lin as a solo side project following the dissolution of his previous band and enlisted former Burning Tree Project co-member Andre Harris, and lifelong friend Danny Park. The band got its name from Lin's personal struggles through which he came to believe humanity is sick and God is the only healer. The ‘IAM’ beginning is the name God refers to Himself as when talking to Moses in Exodus 3:14; the 'MEDIC' part identifies God as the ultimate healer though not to be mistaken as a religious musical group.

== Early Start ==
After uploading a demo recording of track "Unexplained" on Myspace, the band was scouted and signed to Los Angeles-based record label, Authentik Artists. On October 5, 2010, Authentik Artists released IAMMEDIC's debut EP entitled "A Tale of Abigale Withers". The EP was recorded, and produced by Enik Lin, Mark Maxwell (Millionaires (group), Boys Like Girls, Call The Cops), and Ian Kirkpatrick (Call the Cops). Mixed by Grammy nominated engineer, Mark Needham (The Killers, Neon Trees, Sick Puppies, Cobra Starship) the EP was featured on the front pages of iTunes, iLike, Purevolume, and Clear Channels New and Discover. In December 2010, IAMMEDIC locked an endorsement deal with Heydey Footwear.

Later in 2010, Lin decided to take the band full-time and enlisted members Danny Park and Andre Harris, and Dj Yup. The group quickly gained notoriety after being asked to open up for K-Pop sensations, JYJ, while on their New York City tour date, which ultimately did not press through due to JYJ's P1 visas being denied for their US tour.

== Recent Activities ==
- IAMMEDIC's social media presence grew so rapidly that the band charted No. 11 on Billboard.com's NEXT BIG SOUND 25 in April 2011.
- In June 2011, IAMMEDIC, self-released their debut full-length record, Perfect.
- On June 24, 2011, the group opened up for Korean-American and K-Pop singer, Brian Joo, during his 2010 US "Unveiled Tour" Los Angeles date and gained overwhelming support from the K-Pop community.
- On July 5, IAMMEDIC was featured on Korea Times
- On August 23, 2011, IAMMEDIC released their first official music video off Perfect, titled '"Spaceship," through their official YouTube channel, IAMMEDICTV.
- On October 30, 2011, IAMMEDIC was featured on Hallyu Magazine.

As of 2018, the majority of digital releases of previous albums have been taken down.

=== Enik Lin ===
Enik is the lead vocals, producer, main writer, programming, sequencing, piano, keyboards, guitars, drums, violin, keyboards for IAMMEDIC. Before starting IAMMEDIC, Lin was in a band called Burning Tree Project (Tragic Hero/East West/Warner). Enik has also released two singles off his forthcoming solo album.

=== Danny Park ===
Danny contributes as the background vocals and producer. Park is also a DJ on 1TYM Danny's (Taebin) "Danny From LA" on Mnet (TV channel). Park also produced Mnet's docu-reality TV show "Alpha Girls" and "KTOWN Night Market" event in Los Angeles, California.

=== Andre Harris ===
Also known as Dre. Started rapping at the age of 11, then joined several local hip-hop groups. A little after, he learned to play piano from jazz player, Peter Deneff, and songwriter, Joseph Gallo. He also played keyboards and vocals for Burning Tree Project. In charge of vocals, keyboards and also as a co-writer for IAMMEDIC.

=== DJ Yup ===
Also known as Sangyup Jeon, Yup is the newest member and the official DJ for IAMMEDIC. Contributes as live dj and live sequencing. DJ Yup is a popular DJ in South Korea who has had stints in Seattle, Los Angeles, Las Vegas, and Kansas. He can fill clubs of 1,500 as he is a regular DJ in top clubs in Seoul. He is also sponsored by H&M of Korea. Upon meeting and joining IAMMEDIC, DJ Yup toured with Korean-American and K-Pop singer, Brian Joo, for his 4-city "Unveiled" US Club Tour. DJ Yup and Brian Joo collaborated with Seattle-based pop-rock band, New Height's newest single, "Nightmare."

== Discography ==
=== Extended Play ===
Year	Album Information	Track List
2010	The Tale of Abigale Withers (Authentik Artists): Released Date : October 5, 2010; Language : English; Genre : Alternative, Music; Written, Produced, and Recorded by Enik Lin, Mark Maxwell (Co-writer for Cut Me Up), and Ian Kirkpatrick (Co-writer for Unexplained); Mixed by Mark Needham; Mastered by Big Bass Brian Gardner	1. Lose Yourself; 2. Unexplained; 3. A Tale of a Traveling Man; 4. Cut Me Up; 5. Start Over Again; 6. Don't Let Go

=== Studio album ===
Year	Album Information	Track List
2011	Perfect: Released Date : August 30, 2011; Language : English; Genre : Electro / Pop / Glitch; Written, Produced, Recorded and Mixed by Enik Lin; Co-written by Andre Harris; Executive Producer: Danny Park	1. Spaceship; 2. Losing Sleep; 3. Let's Go; 4. Perfect; 5. Life's Little Tragedy; 6. Parachute; 7. Chasing Phantoms; 8. Dangerous; 9. #WELOVEYOULA

=== Singles ===
Year	Track Information
2014	Title : Get Back Home; Genres: Electronic, Music, Dance; Released: Mar 25, 2014
2011	Title : Shake It; Genres: Pop, Music, Electronic; Released: Nov 01, 2011
2011	Title : Burn It Down; Genres: Electronic, Music, Dance; Released: Mar 08, 2011

=== Remixes ===
Year	Remixed Song	Original Artist	Appears On	Remixed by
2010	Like A G6	Far East Movement	FM SATELLITES Episode 22	Enik Lin

== Concerts and tours ==
- JYJ's "The Beginning Showcase World Tour 2010" (US Opening Act) (2010)
- Kollaboration (talent show) New York (2011)
- 2014 Corolla Launch Concert (Opening Act) Los Angeles (2014)
