= Dark culture =

Umbrella term for dark subcultures

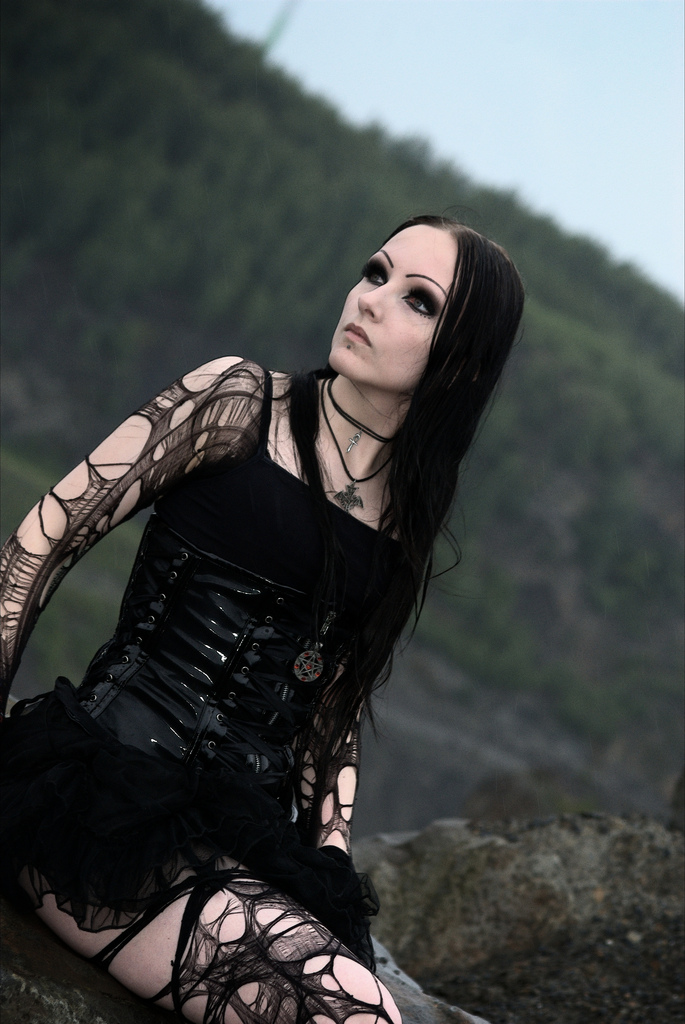
Against the background of various internal fashion trends, the color black is the core element of the self-promoting and individualistic concept of the dark scene.

Dark culture (German Schwarze Szene), also called dark alternative scene, is an umbrella term for thematically related subcultures including the goth and dark wave subculture, the dark neoclassical/dark ambient scene, parts of the post-industrial scene (with the genres electro-industrial, EBM, aggrotech and dark electro) parts of neofolk and the early gothic metal scene. Dark culture's origin lies in followers of dark wave and independent music, but over the decades it has developed to a social network held together by a common concept of aesthetics, self-representation, and individualism. The musical preferences of the dark scene are characterized by a mix of styles ranging from gothic metal, to industrial dance music and dark ambient, to dark neoclassical, neo-medieval and dark folk music, to gothic rock, dark wave and post-punk, the darker ends of electropop.

== History ==
Although the significant movement of 'dark culture' only emerged in the late 1980s, a deeper history exists that inspired this movement dating back to the 1600s during the emergence of witchcraft and witches in Early Modern Europe, as well as the influence from Victorian iconographies.

The term was used initially to target a specific group of magazine readers who shared similar interests in the dark scene, the magazine Zillo considered the most important media platform for dark culture and was at the forefront of anchoring the term 'dark culture' into modern language. Mostly used as a generic term for all sub-scenes and trends in the black scene, nowadays the term is preferred by a large number of scene followers. By 2010, it can be said that the term had properly established itself, particularly in sociology and youth culture research. Due to its emergence in Germany, an assessment was done to conduct the size of German dark culture in 2004, resulting in an estimation of around 50,000 to 100,000 members of people.

== Characteristics ==
Dark culture has historically been used as an umbrella term to describe several subcultures, only emerging as its own movement in the late 1980s. Dark culture includes goth and dark wave culture, electro subculture and parts of the neofolk and post-industrial subcultures. Sometimes referred to as 'dark alternative scene', the term is rarely used in the English language, despite its significance in shaping several other movements and subcultures that emerged throughout history. In this context, the "culture" should not be understood as closed subculture, but as a social environment, consisting of people with similar preferences. Dark culture is regarded as a community defined by common interests such as art, fashion, philosophy, and arguably most significantly, by music. Originating from the shared appreciation of dark wave and independent music, the term now collectively used as 'dark music', dark culture emerged to represent a group of people who define themselves through internal symbols and alternate forms of media. In the 21st century, the culture is appreciated as a heterogeneous collection of different subcultural currents.

The scene is not a musically or aesthetically closed and homogeneous group but rather it is composed of many different currents, some of which may be diametrically opposed in their musical or fashion ideals. The anchor that holds all elements of dark culture together can be viewed as the color black with all its associated symbolism. It is seen as an expression of seriousness, darkness and mysticism, but also of hopelessness and emptiness, melancholy, as well as its association with mourning and death.

=== Music ===
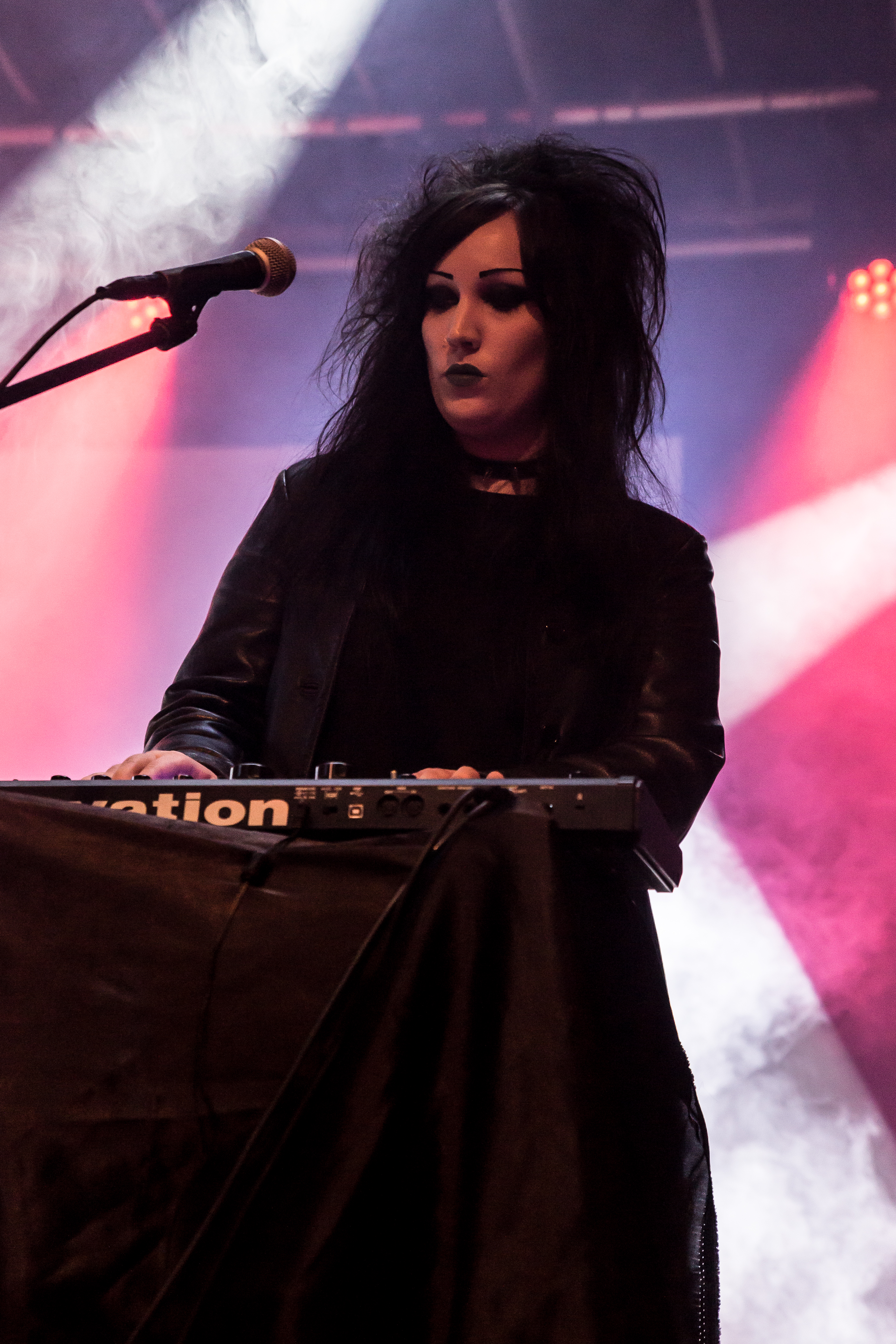
The Italian dark wave band Dark Door at the Nocturnal Culture Night 12 2017 in Deutzen, Germany

Dark culture is divided into different currents, some of which are in stark contrast to one another in their musical and fashion ideas. The musical preferences of the different supporters of the black scene are characterized by a style mix that covers a broad spectrum from avant-garde to electronic pop music, early music, neo-classical and folk to punk rock, techno and ambient.

Due to its internationally recognized events and the high proportion of music produced in Germany, the German subculture is perceived as outstanding and special. Much of dark culture's foundations can be attributed to beginning in Germany, where the movement is celebrated by many, particularly visible in the element of music. Throughout Germany, dark music is very popular and each year the country hosts a number of festivals that celebrate this musical genre. 'Wave-Gotik-Treffen' is an annual festival held in Leipzig, Germany, which honours 'dark music' and 'dark culture', attracting between 18,000 - 20,000 attendees each year.

=== Fashion ===
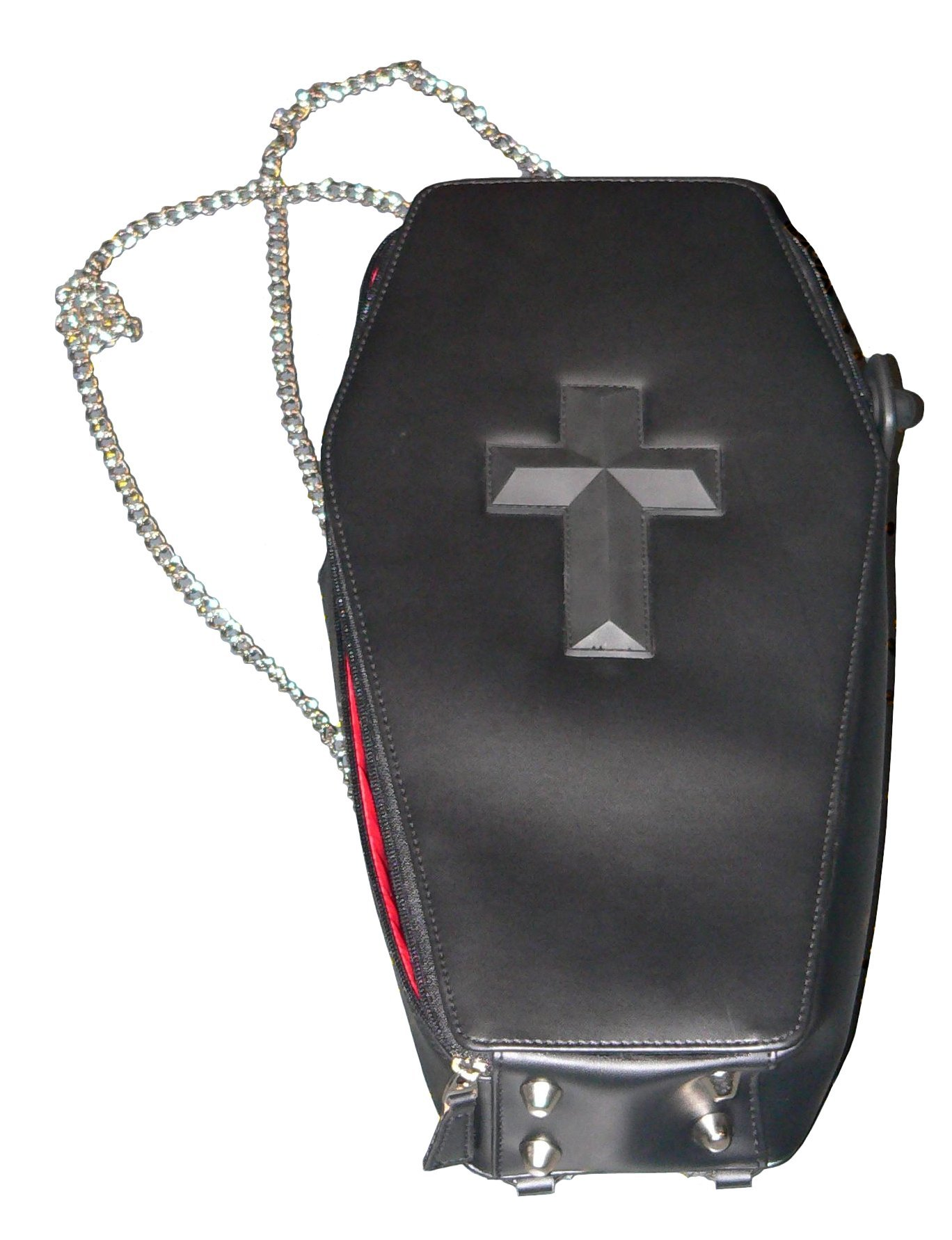
Common accessory worn by members of dark culture: a backpack in the shape of a coffin

Since its emergence, dark culture has differentiated a range of sub-scenes, resulting in a variation of emerging styles, all independent however in close similarity to a general 'gothic style'. The different currents of dark culture often intrinsically influenced one another throughout the gradual development of the movement.

The colour black and the rise of consciousness surrounding aesthetics and visual self expression have been developed through the stylistic elements that dark culture represents. Although the fashion of the movement cannot be narrowed down to one particular style, there are notable common aesthetic choices made by members of the scene. Body jewelry such as piercings and tattoos are just as common as clothing in the realm of self-expression in dark culture. Jewelry is mostly worn in silver and steel and often include animal symbols in the form of spiders, snakes and scorpions as well as religious and mythological symbols.

== Gothic subculture ==
Although the term dark culture has been used in scene media and the press since the 1990s, the misleading title Gothic, referring to a sub-flow of the scene, is wrongly used to describe elements specifically linked to dark culture. Since around 2004 the term "Gothic" has been inaccurately used by non-members to refer to members of dark culture, leading to much confusion and controversy regarding all sub-cultures and sub-flows of dark culture. The "Gothic subculture" is specifically linked to the post-punk, gothic metal and dark neoclassical subsets within the scene, while the term "goth subculture represents an even more narrowed down subset, specifically linked to dark offshoots of post-punk music," and thus only represents a small portion of the large spectrum of dark culture, despite Gothicism being used as an overarching term to name all members of the dark scene.

== Events ==
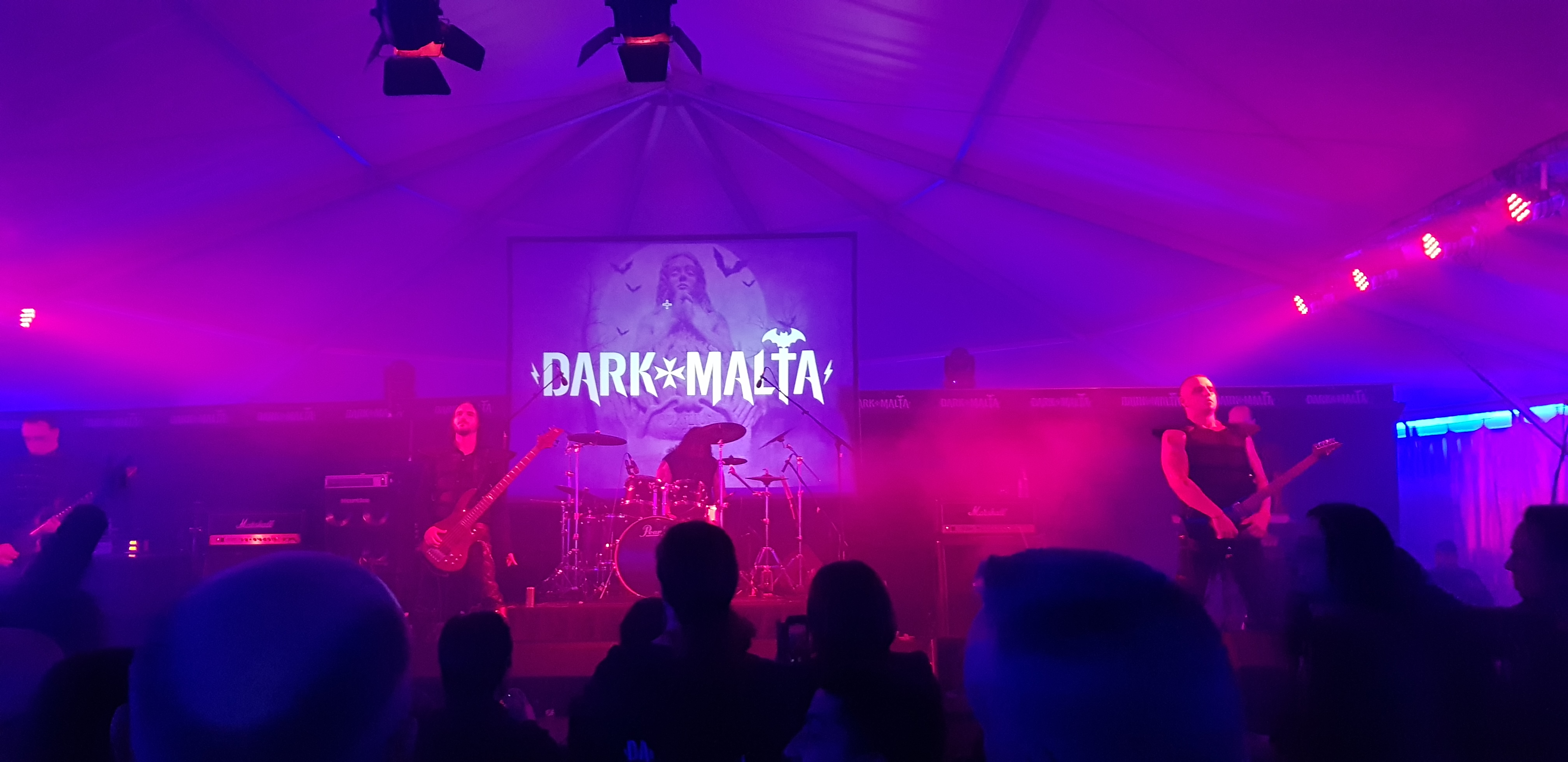
Dark Malta Festival 2019. Event held in Southern Europe that offers international gothic/metal/industrial bands

Throughout history, highly significant events have evolved in the celebration and acknowledgement of movements surrounding dark culture. A significant event is World Goth Day, which originated in the United Kingdom in 2009; held on 22 May, its observance has spread internationally. Aspects of dark culture's fashion, music, and art are celebrated on this day and combine to honour the history of this movement and the inclusivity and dark expression that it represents.

== See also ==
- Dark academia
