= If It Ain't Love =

Single by Jason Derulo
- Released: April 1, 2016
- Recorded: 2015
- Genre: Dance-pop
- Length: 3:23
- Label: Beluga Heights; Warner Bros.
- Songwriters: Jason Desrouleaux; Stefan Johnson; Jordan K. Johnson; Marcus Lomax; Ian Kirkpatrick; Talay Riley; Lindy Robbins
- Producers: Kirkpatrick; The Monsters and the Strangerz

Jason Derulo singles chronology
"Hello Friday" (2016)	"If It Ain't Love" (2016)	"Kiss the Sky" (2016)

"If It Ain't Love" is a song by American singer and songwriter Jason Derulo. It was released as a single on April 1, 2016. The song was produced by Ian Kirkpatrick and The Monsters and the Strangerz. On April 3, 2016, Derulo performed the song for the first time on television at the 3rd iHeartRadio Music Awards. The artwork of the single features Derulo in a violet suit and a fedora hat covering his eyes.

== Music video ==
The music video for "If It Ain't Love" premiered via social video network musical.ly on May 9, 2016. It was directed by Joe Labisi and Derulo.

== Charts ==
=== Weekly charts ===
Chart (2016)	Peak position
Australia (ARIA)	34
Belgium (Ultratip Bubbling Under Flanders)	34
Belgium (Ultratip Bubbling Under Wallonia)	19
Canada Hot 100 (Billboard)	37
Czech Republic Airplay (ČNS IFPI)	33
Denmark (Tracklisten)	21
Germany (GfK)	80
Ireland (IRMA)	35
Italy (FIMI)	65
Netherlands (Single Top 100)	37
Netherlands (Dutch Top 40)	33
New Zealand Heatseekers (Recorded Music NZ)	2
Portugal (AFP)	67
Sweden (Sverigetopplistan)	44
Switzerland (Schweizer Hitparade)	58
UK Singles (OCC)	49
US Billboard Hot 100	67
US Pop Airplay (Billboard)	18

=== Year-end charts ===
Chart (2016)	Position
Denmark (Tracklisten)	74

== Certifications ==
Region	Certification	Certified units/sales
Australia (ARIA)	Platinum	70,000^{‡}
Denmark (IFPI Danmark)	Platinum	90,000^{‡}
Italy (FIMI)	Gold	25,000^{‡}
New Zealand (RMNZ)	Gold	15,000^{‡}
United Kingdom (BPI)	Silver	200,000^{‡}
^{‡} Sales+streaming figures based on certification alone.
