= Do Overs and Second Chances =

EP by Go Radio
- Released: April 20, 2010
- Recorded: 2009–2010
- Genre: Alternative rock, pop punk
- Label: Fearless
- Producer: Zack Odom, Kenneth Mount

Go Radio chronology
Welcome to Life (2008)	Do Overs and Second Chances (2010)	Lucky Street (2011)

Singles from Do Overs and Second Chances
- 1. "Goodnight Moon" Released: November 25, 2019

Professional ratings
Review scores
Source	Rating
idobi	4/5 stars

Do Overs and Second Chances is the second EP by American rock band Go Radio. It was released April 20, 2010 on Fearless. The EP was originally planned to be only 5 tracks; however, Go Radio returned to the studio in early 2010 to record two additional tracks.

In 2010, Do Overs and Second Chances sold more than 15,000 copies in the U.S. The single "Goodnight Moon" is a reference to the children's book, Goodnight Moon, and the track was later included in the deluxe edition of Lucky Street (2011).

== Track listing ==
All tracks written by Jason Lancaster, except where noted.

1. "When Dreaming Gets Drastic" (Jason Lancaster, Zack Odom, Kenneth Mount) – 3:17
2. "Thanks for Nothing" – 3:24
3. "Letters and Love Notes" (Alex Reed) – 3:20
4. "It's Not a Trap, I Promise" – 3:20
5. "In Our Final Hour" – 3:21
6. "You Hold Your Breath, I'll Hold My Liquor" – 3:14
7. "Goodnight Moon" – 5:06

== Chart positions ==
Chart (2010)	Peak position
U.S. Billboard 200	179
U.S. Billboard Top Heatseekers	8
U.S. Billboard Independent Albums	36
U.S. Billboard Alternative New Artist	4

== Personnel ==
- Jason Lancaster – Lead vocals, piano, rhythm guitar
- Alex Reed – Lead guitar, vocals
- Matt Burns – Bass guitar, backing vocals
- Steven Kopacz – Drums, percussion, backing vocals
