= Go Radio =

American rock band

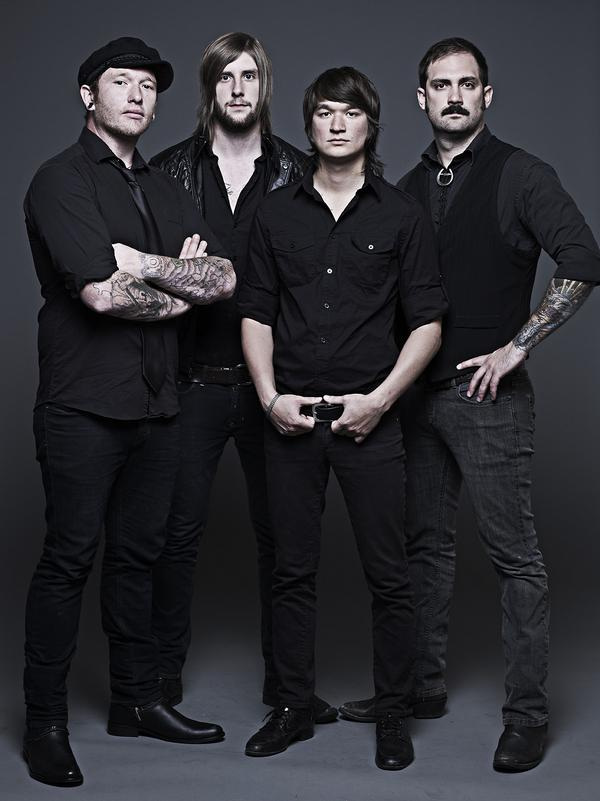

Background information
- Origin: Tallahassee, Florida, U.S.
- Genres: Alternative rock, pop rock, pop punk
- Years active: 2007–2013, 2019–2023
- Label: Fearless
- Spinoff of: Mayday Parade, Don’t Die Cindy
- Past members: Jason Lancaster; Alex Reed; Matt 'Burns' Poulos; Steven Kopacz; Tony Planas; Patrick Hosey
- Website: goradiomusic.com

Go Radio was an American rock band from Tallahassee, Florida, formed by former Mayday Parade vocalist, guitarist and lyricist Jason Lancaster in April 2007.

The band toured with The Red Jumpsuit Apparatus, A Day to Remember, as well as Mayday Parade. They played the entire Vans Warped Tour in 2011, and again during 2013, which was their last tour as a band.

The band announced that they would break up on October 6, 2013. The disbandment was apparently due to the lead singer, Jason Lancaster, setting priorities and putting his family first. Lancaster said in an interview on The Gunz Show that the reason for the band's break up was completely false. Jason has no intention of stopping with his music and is writing new music. Lancaster said that he felt Go Radio had run its course as a band and it was time to move on to the next chapter of his life. When they parted, each of the band members planned to continue making music on their own.

In September 2019, the band announced they had re-united and would begin making music again and were "sharing ideas and working on songs."

In June 2023, it was announced that all members of Go Radio except for Lancaster had started a new band and Go Radio had "dissipated".

== History ==
=== Formation and Welcome to Life (2007–09) ===
Go Radio was formed in January 2007 before Jason Lancaster left Mayday Parade. Together with Matt 'Burns' Poulos, as well as Steven Kopacz and Patrick Hosey of the Florida band Don't Die Cindy, Lancaster started Go Radio. The name "Go Radio" was originally going to be the name of a Mayday Parade side project of Lancaster's. Hosey left the band in early 2008 and was replaced by Tony Planas.

In 2008 Go Radio released their debut EP Welcome to Life. Planas left the band in late 2008, and was replaced by Alex Reed, formerly of the Michigan band "Carawae". Reed contacted the band through Myspace and originally joined only as a touring guitarist, but was later promoted to a full-time member.

=== Do Overs and Second Chances (2009–10) ===
On September 8, 2009 the band released their first studio update. They revealed that they were in the process of recording a new EP with producers Zack Odom and Kenneth Mount, both of whom produced Mayday Parade's A Lesson in Romantics (2007). On October 5, 2009, Go Radio released two of the songs from the EP on their Myspace. The band then signed to Fearless on January 21, 2010, and went on to release Do Overs and Second Chances as their Fearless debut on April 20, 2010.

=== Lucky Street (2010–11) ===
In the July 2010 issue of Alternative Press Lancaster revealed that he had begun writing for Go Radio's debut album for Fearless. On August 31, 2010 in Brooklyn, NY the band headed into the studio with Tim O'Heir. They finished recording on September 29, 2010. The resulting album, Lucky Street was released on March 1, 2011. The album was very well received by critics, and debuted at number 77 on the US Billboard 200 and debuted within the top 20 of the US Billboard Rock, Independent, and Alternative Albums charts. On June 6, 2011, a music video for the single "Any Other Heart" premiered on Vevo.

In the summer of 2011, they played the entire Vans Warped Tour on the Nintendo 3DS Stage. Their next tour will be the first one that takes them overseas as they head to Australia to take part in the Soundwave Counter-Revolution mini-festival from September 24, 2011 until October 12, 2011.

Go Radio announced the release of a deluxe edition of Lucky Street on October 24, 2011. It contains 8 tracks not seen on the original version of the album.

=== Close the Distance (2012–13) ===
In early 2012 the band began demoing new songs for their second studio full-length.

On March 1, 2012 Jason Lancaster announced that the band had finished recording. On April 20, 2012, the album Close the Distance was announced with a release date of August 14, 2012. The release date was pushed back to September 18, 2012. On July 16 the new release date was confirmed and the band announced their album art and track listing along with a preview for their first song "Collide.". To promote their album, Go Radio started a sharing contest in which fans had the chance to unlock the new song off Close the Distance when the number of views, shares, and newsletter signups in total reached 20,000. On July 18, two days after the contest started, fans had already reached the goal and the song premiered on Alternative Press magazine's website The band joined the Vans Warped Tour for all of its 2013 tenure. This was their last major tour prior to their break up in October.

=== Hiatus (2013-19) ===
On October 6, 2013, the band announced their breakup, the band cited Lancaster's desire to settle down with his wife. Lancaster has stated that he will continue to make music on his own, releasing his solo album, As You Are in mid-2014. Kopacz joined Anarbor as a touring drummer. Alex Reed joined another band from Tallahassee, Stages & Stereos as a guitarist.

=== Reunion and eventual breakup (2019-present) ===
On September 29, 2019, the band announced that they have reunited and are currently working on new music. On November 25, 2019, the band released "Goodnight Moon", a fan favorite from Do Overs and Second Chances, as a single to celebrate their reunion. Paired with it was "Say It Again", their first new recording since their breakup in 2013. On July 24, 2020, the band released another single entitled "So Love". On July 15, 2022, the band released the single "Lighter". This is the last single the band released before Reed, Kopacz, and Poulos announced their new band, Be Nice to People, on June 24, 2023. On the Spotify bio for Be Nice to People, it is stated that the band members "formed BNTP to continue creating together as other projects they were involved in dissipated", implying Go Radio is no longer together.

== Band members ==
- Jason Lancaster – lead vocals, piano, rhythm guitar (2007–2013, 2019–2023)
- Matt "Burns" Poulos – bass guitar, backing vocals (2007–2013, 2019–2023)
- Steven Kopacz – drums, percussion (2007–2013, 2019–2023)
- Alex Reed – lead guitar, vocals (2009–2013, 2019–2023)
- Patrick Hosey – lead guitar, backing vocals (2007)
- Tony Planas – lead guitar, backing vocals (2007–2008)

== Discography ==
=== Studio albums ===
Year	Album	Chart Positions			
Year	Album	Billboard 200	Rock Albums	Independent Albums	Alternative Albums
2011	Lucky Street: Released: March 1, 2011; Label: Fearless	77	18	10	13
2012	Close the Distance: Release: September 18, 2012; Label: Fearless	54	22	12	13

=== EPs ===
Year	Album	Chart Positions			
Year	Album	Billboard 200	Heatseekers	Independent Albums	Alternative New Artist
2008	Welcome to Life (EP): Released: August 13, 2008; Label: Self-released	–	–	–	–
2010	Do Overs and Second Chances: Released: April 20, 2010; Label: Fearless	179	8	36	4

=== Singles ===
Year	Song	Released	From
2009	"Why I'm Home"	February 2, 2009	non-album single
2009	"Stay Gone"	May 29, 2009	non-album single
2011	"Any Other Heart"	January 31, 2011	Lucky Street
2011	"The Truth Is"	February 15, 2011	Lucky Street
2012	"Go to Hell"	August 7, 2012	Closing the Distance
2019	"Goodnight Moon"	November 25, 2019	Do Overs and Second Chances
2020	"So Love"	July 24, 2020	Non-album single
2022	"Lighter"	July 15, 2022	Non-album single

=== Early unreleased demos ===
- "Hollie Ollie Oxen Free"
- "That California Song"
- "I Wish It Would Snow"
- "Beautiful Man"
- "Slow Motion"

=== Compilation appearances ===
- 'Tis The Season To Be Fearless with "O Holy Night", originally composed by Adolphe Adam.
- Punk Goes Pop 4 with "Rolling in the Deep" (Adele cover)

== Tours ==
2008

- The Scenic, Lannen Fall, The July Week – To Catch a Preda-Tour (supporting act, U.S.)

2009

- The Red Jumpsuit Apparatus – Kick Your Own Ass Tour (opening act, 5/5 - 5/28 and 8/02 - 8/22 and 9/18, U.S.)

2010

- A Day to Remember – Toursick 2010 (opening act, 4/19 - 5/16, U.S.)
- The Dangerous Summer – Reach for the Sun Tour 2010 (supporting act, 7/10 - 7/17, U.S.)
- Secondhand Serenade – Summer Tour (opening act, 7/20 - 8/8, U.S.)
- Mayday Parade – Fearless Friends Tour (opening act, supporting act on select dates, 10/13 – 11/28, U.S.)

2011

- Emarosa w/ Chiodos, Go Radio, Decoder (supporting act, 2/15 - 3/5, U.S.)
- A Rocket to the Moon – On Your Side Tour (supporting act, 3/15 - 4/23, U.S.)
- Go Radio w/ Sparks the Rescue, This Century, Select Start – District Lines Tour (headliner, 5/5 - 5/28, U.S.)
- Warped Tour 2011 – Warped Tour 2011 (6/24 - 8/14, U.S. and Canada)
- Counter-Revolution - Counter-Revolution - (9/24, 9/25, 9/30, 10/2, 10/3, Australia)
- Yellowcard - Yellowcard Fall Tour (supporting act, 10/8 - 11/18, U.S and Canada)

2012

- Go Radio w/ This Providence, Tyler Carter (ex-Woe, Is Me), Simple As Surgery, and Ivory Lights - Lucky Street Tour (headliner, 3/20 - 5/13, U.S)
- SafetySuit - Fall Tour (direct support, 9/7 - 10/5, U.S)
- Go Radio w/ Paradise Fears and Stages and Stereos - #GoToHell Tour (headliner, 11/2 - 12/4, U.S)

2013

- The Summer Set w/ We Are the In Crowd, Go Radio and For the Foxes - Wake Up & Be Awesome Tour (supporting act, 2/21 - 3/30, U.S)
- Warped Tour 2013 – Warped Tour 2013 (6/15 - 8/4, U.S. and Canada)
