= Lucky Street (album) =

Studio album by Go Radio
- Released: March 1, 2011
- Recorded: August 31 – September 29, 2010
- Studio: Mission Sound, Headgear, Brooklyn, New York
- Genre: Alternative rock, pop rock
- Length: 53:08
- Label: Fearless
- Producer: Tim O'Heir

Go Radio chronology
Do Overs and Second Chances (2010)	Lucky Street (2011)	Close the Distance (2012)

Singles from Lucky Street
- 1. "Any Other Heart" Released: January 31, 2011; 2. "The Truth Is" Released: February 15, 2011

Lucky Street is the debut studio album by American rock band Go Radio. Produced by Tim O'Heir and mixed by James Paul Wisner, Lucky Street was released March 1, 2011 on Fearless Records.

== Background ==
Vocalist/guitarist Jason Lancaster was a member of Mayday Parade since their 2005 formation, which resulted from a merger between local acts Kid Named Chicago (which featured Lancaster) and Defining Moment. While recording their debut album A Lesson in Romantics, Lancaster left the band in March 2007 citing a lack of writing credit on the band's releases. Sometime afterwards, he formed Go Radio and was joined by bassist Matt Burns, drummer Steven Kopacz and guitarist Tony Planas. They released the Welcome to Life EP in August 2008, which was followed by the addition of guitarist Alex Reed and a tour with the Red Jumpsuit Apparatus. In January 2010, they signed to independent label Fearless Records and released the Do Overs and Second Chances EP. The EP had minor success, charting on the lower-end of the Billboard 200 chart; it was promoted with supporting slots for A Day to Remember, the Dangerous Summer and Secondhand Serenade across North America.

In the July 2010 Issue of Alternative Press Jason Lancaster revealed that he had begun writing for Go Radio's debut LP. In August, the band entered the studio with Tim O'Heir and finished recording on September 29, 2010.

== Composition ==
Lucky Street has been described as an alternative rock and pop rock release, with elements of pop punk and punk rock. Lancaster's voice was compared to Rob Thomas of Matchbox Twenty. Lyrically, the album talks about events in the band members' lives, alongside the themes of life, death, faith and religion, and the lack of these concepts. The title-track was initially written for Do Overs and Second Chances, though the band felt it stood out amongst the rest of the material. It was inspired by a dream Lancaster had revolving around the end of the world; he was on Lucky Street in New York City, witnessing "everything crumble around me." There were a few survivors staring up, observing balloons filling the skyline. The track drew comparisons to punk rock bands the Ataris and the Swellers. "Any Other Heart" was compared to the poppy tracks of Rise Against; it was inspired by his stepmother Janet abandoning him two weeks after his father's death.

"Singing with the King" is about celebrating life in the face of death amongst friends and family. The Muse-esque "Strength to Stay" was written after Lancaster's grandmother died and a friend of the band was fighting through terminal cancer. "Swear It Like You Mean It" dates back to when Reed moved to Tallahassee, Florida; while the band was working on demos, he played the chord progression on piano and they began working on it. "Why I'm Home" was previously released as an iTunes single in February 2009. For its inclusion on Lucky Street, the band added strings to give the track a bigger sound. "Kill the Beast" talks about being happy where a person is, and the journey they've taken to get there. It was a bass-driven track with parts of it being reminiscent of the Starting Line and the Dangerous Summer. Lancaster said "Hold On" sees a person use every fibre of their strength and being unable to continue their journey, yet "somehow summoning enough energy from somewhere deep inside of you to carry on." The acoustic-based song incorporated strings, and was in the style of "Swing Life Away" by Rise Against.

"Forever My Father" is dedicated to Lancaster's father and serves as a plea for something to feel the hole left by him. It was original recorded for the Welcome to Life EP with his sister Erin and brother Daniel; an electric version was recorded for Lucky Street. "Fight, Fight (Reach for the Sky)" initially existed as a verse idea for the vocals, which the group felt was too different compared to the rest of the record. O'Heir insisted it wasn't far removed and that they should keep it on the album. "House of Hallways" was the first track written for the album, and talks about find one's self in situations we're afraid of. According to Lancaster, "Redemption in the Verse" is a "rainy day "we can endure" story." "The Truth Is" has its origins in a song Poulos wrote while he was dating his wife. It acted as the last track they recorded for the album, and the one they fully intended to be the closer.

== Release ==
On December 21, 2010, Lucky Street was announced for release in March 2011. "Any Other Heart" was released as a single on January 31, 2011. "The Truth Is" premiered on Ragged.com before being released as a single on February 15. Following this, the group supported Chiodos on their US tour in February and March. Partway through the tour on February 25, the album was made available for streaming through the group's Myspace, before being released through Fearless Records on March 1. Some versions included the original version of "Forever My Father" as an extra track. They promoted its release supporting A Rocket to the Moon in March and April on their On Your Side tour.

In May, the group went on their first US headlining tour, with support from Sparks the Rescue, This Century and Select Start. On June 6, a music video for "Any Other Heart" premiered on Vevo. Between June and August, the band performed as part of the Warped Tour. In late September and early October, the band toured Australia as part of the Soundwave Counter-Revolution festival. They supported Yellowcard on their headlining US tour in October and November. On October 25, a deluxe edition of the album was released featuring bonus tracks, such as "Goodnight Moon" and a cover of Adele's "Rolling in the Deep"; the digital version included additional bonus tracks. Prior to the release, a music video for "Goodnight Moon" premiered on Vevo.

== Reception ==
Professional ratings
Review scores
Source	Rating
AbsolutePunk	80%
AllMusic	3/5 stars
The Aquarian Weekly	Favorable
Cityview	Mixed
Dead Press!	7/10 stars
Sputnikmusic	4/5

Lucky Street was very well received by critics, with Drew Beringer of AbsolutePunk saying "From the soaring opener to the powerful closing number, Lucky Street bleeds with emotion. Add in Jason Lancaster's one-of-kind vocals, and it should come as no surprise that Go Radio has created one of the best rock records of 2011."

Lucky Street charted number 73 on the Billboard 200, selling over 7,000 copies within its first week of release.

== Track listing ==
No.	Title	Length
1.	"Lucky Street"	4:13
2.	"Any Other Heart"	3:51
3.	"Singing With the King"	3:17
4.	"Strength to Stay"	3:22
5.	"Swear It Like You Mean It"	3:07
6.	"Why I'm Home"	3:36
7.	"Kill the Beast"	3:15
8.	"Hold On"	3:09
9.	"Forever My Father"	4:03
10.	"Fight, Fight (Reach for the Sky)"	3:17
11.	"House of Hallways"	3:34
12.	"Redemption in the Verse"	4:28
13.	"The Truth Is"	5:01

Deluxe edition
No.	Title	Length
1.	"Lucky Street"	4:14
2.	"Any Other Heart"	3:52
3.	"Singing with the King"	3:17
4.	"Goodnight Moon" (from Do Overs and Second Chances)	5:02
5.	"Strength to Stay"	3:23
6.	"Swear It Like You Mean It"	3:08
7.	"Why I'm Home"	3:36
8.	"Kill the Beast"	3:16
9.	"Hold On"	3:10
10.	"Forever My Father"	4:04
11.	"Fight, Fight (Reach for the Sky)"	3:18
12.	"House of Hallways"	3:35
13.	"Redemption in the Verse"	4:28
14.	"The Truth Is"	4:57
15.	"Ready or Not" (remix; original version on Welcome to Life)	4:30
16.	"Stay Gone"	3:56
17.	"Worth It All the While"	3:19
18.	"Any Other Heart" (Demo)	2:51
19.	"Rolling in the Deep" (Adele cover from Punk Goes Pop 4)	3:55
20.	"Forever My Father (feat. Erin and Daniel Lancaster)" (from Welcome to Life)	4:45
Total length:		66:41

iTunes bonus tracks
No.	Title	Length
21.	"Goodnight Moon" (demo)	3:58
22.	"Thanks for Nothing" (acoustic)	3:43
23.	"Any Other Heart" (music video)	3:57
24.	"Goodnight Moon" (music video)	5:10
Total length:		93:24

== Personnel ==
Personnel per digital deluxe booklet.

Go Radio

- Jason Lancaster – lead vocals, guitar
- Alex Reed – guitar, vocals
- Matt "Burns" Poulos – bass
- Steven Kopacz – drums

Additional musicians

- Strings on "Why I'm Home", "Hold On", and "House of Hallways":
  - Garo Yellin – cello
  - Hiroko Taguchi – violin / viola
  - Amy Kimball – violin
- Horns on "Fight, Fight (Reach for the Sky)":
  - Matt Agrella – arrangement / trumpet / trombone

Production

- Dave Pinkham – recording horns
- Tim O'Heir – producer
- James Paul Wisner – mixing, additional tracking
- Tony Noriega - Assistant mixer
- Ue Nastasi – mastering
- Lee The Terminator Dyess – engineer, mixing on "Ready or Not"
- James Wisner – producer, mixing on "Worth It all the While" and "Rolling in the Deep"
- Alex Sheldon – artwork

== Chart positions ==
Charts (2011)	Peak position
U.S. Billboard 200	77
U.S. Billboard Rock Albums	18
U.S. Billboard Independent Albums	10
U.S. Billboard Alternative Albums	13
