= Forever the Sickest Kids discography =

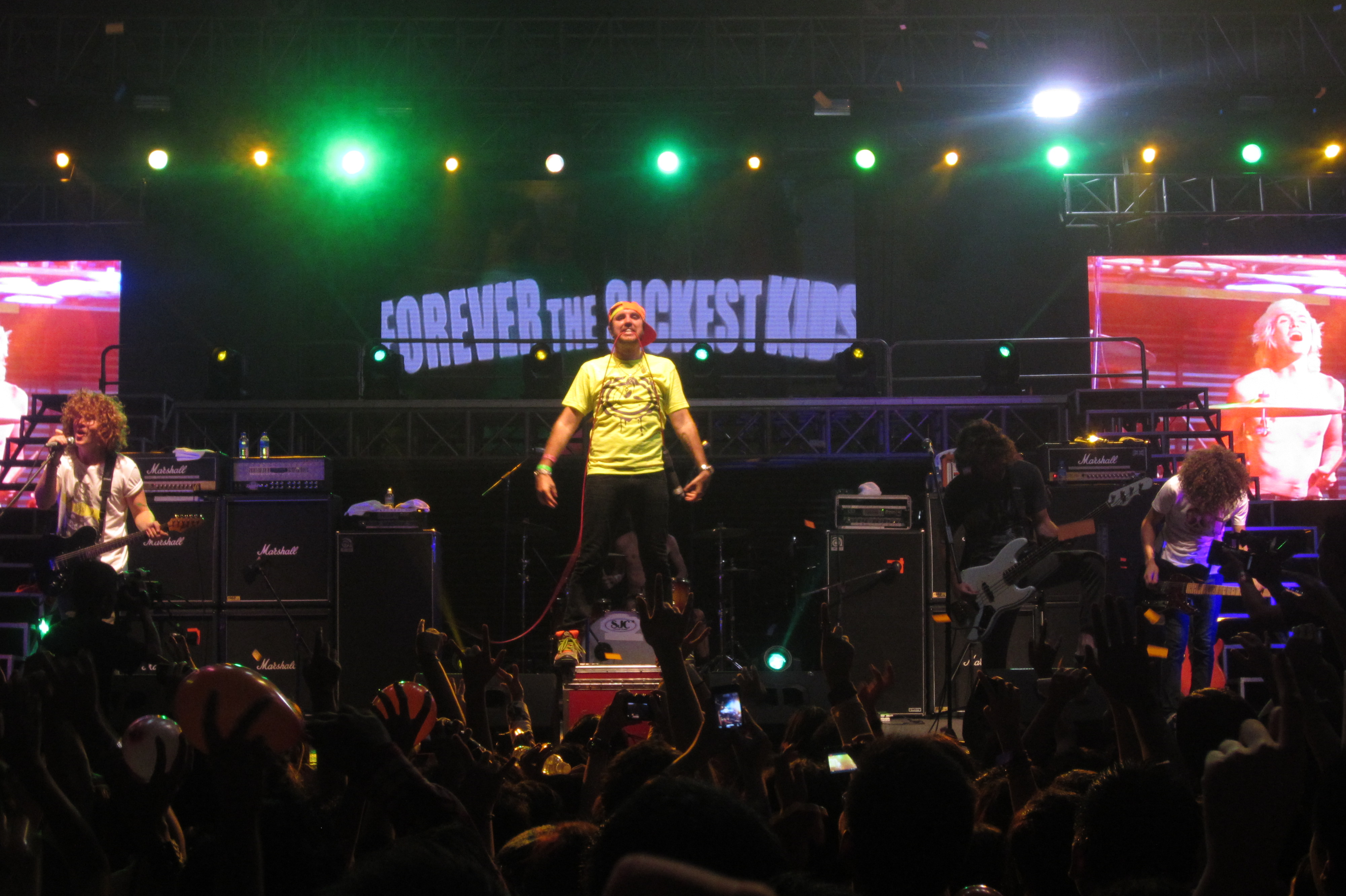
- Forever the Sickest Kids performing at Bazooka Rocks 2012
- Studio albums: 3
- Extended plays: 4
- Singles: 12
- Music videos: 10

The discography of American pop-punk band Forever the Sickest Kids consists of three studio albums, four extended plays, twelve singles and ten music videos.

The group signed with Universal Motown Records in June 2007, and released their debut EP, Television Off, Party On the following month. They released their debut studio album, Underdog Alma Mater on April 29, 2008, peaking at number 45 on the Billboard 200. The album features two singles, "Whoa Oh! (Me vs. Everyone)" and "She's a Lady". On November 17, 2009, the band released the EP, The Weekend: Friday. The EP contained two singles, "What Do You Want from Me" and "She Likes (Bittersweet Love)", with the first being featured on Diary of a Wimpy Kid.

Their second studio album, Forever the Sickest Kids was released on March 1, 2011. Three singles were released in promotion: "Keep On Bringing Me Down", "I Guess You Can Say Things Are Getting Pretty Serious" and "Summer Song". The album peaked at number 33 on the Billboard 200. Their third studio album, J.A.C.K. was released via Fearless Records on June 24, 2013, debuting at number 94 on the Billboard 200. "Chin Up Kid", "Nice to Meet You" and "Nikki" were released as singles from the album.

"Whoa Oh! (Me vs. Everyone)" became the group's most popular song, gaining moderate radio airplay and charting on the US Pop Airplay chart at number 38, and becoming the band's top downloaded song.

== Albums ==
=== Studio albums ===
List of studio albums, with selected chart positions
Title	Album details	Peak chart positions				
Title	Album details	US	US Alt.	US Indie	US Rock	CAN
Underdog Alma Mater	Released: April 29, 2008; Label: Universal Motown; Format: CD, digital download	45	9	—	13	—
Forever the Sickest Kids	Released: March 1, 2011; Label: Universal Motown; Format: CD, digital download	33	5	—	8	92
J.A.C.K.	Released: June 24, 2013; Label: Fearless; Format: CD, LP, digital download	94	23	28	33	—
"—" denotes a recording that did not chart or was not released in that territory.

== Extended plays ==
List of extended plays, with selected chart positions
Title	Album details	Peak chart positions		
Title	Album details	US	US Alt.	US Rock
Television Off, Party On	Released: July 3, 2007; Label: Universal Motown; Format: CD, digital download	—	—	—
The Sickest Warped Tour EP	Released: July 16, 2007; Label: Universal Motown; Format: CD, digital download	—	—	—
Hot Party Jamz	Released: March 22, 2008; Label: Universal Motown; Format: CD, digital download	—	—	—
The Weekend: Friday	Released: November 17, 2009; Label: Universal Motown; Format: CD, digital download	107	23	33
"—" denotes a recording that did not chart or was not released in that territory.

== Singles ==
List of singles as lead artist, with selected chart positions
Title	Year	Peak chart positions			Album
Title	Year	US Pop	JPN	UK	Album
"Whoa Oh! (Me vs. Everyone)"	2008	38	1	—	Underdog Alma Mater
"She's a Lady"	2008	—	—	—	Underdog Alma Mater
"What Do You Want from Me"	2009	—	—	—	The Weekend: Friday
"She Likes (Bittersweet Love)"	2010	—	—	— (Note: "She Likes (Bittersweet Love)" did not enter the UK Singles Chart, but peaked at number one on the UK Kerrang Top 10 chart.)	The Weekend: Friday
"Keep On Bringing Me Down"	2010	—	—	—	Forever the Sickest Kids
"I Guess You Can Say Things Are Getting Pretty Serious"	2011	—	—	—	Forever the Sickest Kids
"Summer Song"	2011	—	—	—	Forever the Sickest Kids
"Shut the Front Door (Too Young for This)"	2011	—	—	—	Non-album singles
"Mistletoe is for Quitters"	2011	—	—	—	Non-album singles
"Chin Up Kid"	2013	—	—	—	J.A.C.K.
"Nikki"	2013	—	—	—	J.A.C.K.
"Nice to Meet You"	2013	—	—	—	J.A.C.K.
"—" denotes releases that did not chart

=== Promotional singles ===
Title	Year	Album
"I Don't Know About You, But I Came to Dance"	2008	Underdog Alma Mater
"Believe Me, I'm Lying"	2008	Underdog Alma Mater
"King for a Day"	2011	Forever the Sickest Kids

== Music videos ==
Title	Year	Director(s)	Ref.
"Whoa Oh! (Me vs. Everyone)"	2008	Shane Drake	
"She's a Lady"	2008	Phil Ruland, Ryan Ruland and Kyle Burns	
"What Do You Want from Me"	2009	David Brodsky	
"She Likes (Bittersweet Love)"	2010	Danny Drysdale	
"I Guess You Can Say Things Are Getting Pretty Serious"	2011	Forever the Sickest Kids	
"Summer Song"	2011	Forever the Sickest Kids	
"Shut the Front Door (Too Young for This)"	2012	Danny Drysdale	
"Chin Up Kid"	2013	Dougie Harvey and Ivo Duran	
"Nikki"	2013	Danny Drysdale	
"Nice To Meet You"	2013	Unknown	

== Other appearances ==
Year	Title	Album	Ref.
2008	"Men in Black" (Originally performed by Will Smith featuring Coko)	Punk Goes Crunk	
2009	"Jumping (Out the Window) (The Remix)" (with Ron Browz)	Non-album single	
2010	"Um Lance, Não Um Romance" (with Cine)	As Cores Ao Vivo	
2010	"Damn Rough Night" (Artist vs. Poet featuring Austin Bello)	Favorite Fix	
2010	"Crazy Train" (Originally performed by Ozzy Osbourne)	Punk Goes Classic Rock	
2012	"We Found Love" (Originally performed by Rihanna featuring Calvin Harris	Punk Goes Pop Volume 5	
