= Ian Scott (producer) =

American record producer and songwriter

- Also known as: iRok
- Born: Ian Brendon Scott; 1982 (age 43–44)
- Origin: United States
- Genres: Pop; dance; electric; hip hop; rock
- Occupations: Record producer; songwriter
- Instruments: Keyboard; sampler; guitar
- Years active: 1995–present
- Label: Rondor/Universal
- Website: www.umusicpub.com

Ian Brendon Scott (born 1982), also known by the pseudonym iRok, is an American record producer and songwriter. In 2006, Scott joined Mark Jackson to produce and license songs and underscore for hit MTV shows such as The Hills, Laguna Beach, The City, Real World/Road Rules Challenge and many others. Later in 2006 Ian along with his partner Mark produced and co-wrote the hit single Yeah performed by famed Korean Artist Park Jung-ah. The song hit the top of Korean charts and launched Ian's career. The partnership between Jackson and Scott later formed the music production team MJ&iRoK.

== Biography ==
Together MJ&iRoK have produced tracks for artists and groups such as Bishop Briggs, OneRepublic, Forever The Sickest Kids, Brandyn H*Wood Bordeaux, Josh Kelley, Pete Yorn, Ice Cube, Snoop Dogg, Park Jung-ah, Girls Aloud, Brenda Song, Alyson Stoner, Colette Carr, Cody Wise and Brinn Nicole, among others.

== Publishing company ==
In 2010, Scott inked an exclusive publishing deal with Rondor Music Publishing, a division UMPG.

== Discography ==
=== Songwriting credits ===
Year	Song	Artist	Album
2006	Yeah'	Park Jung-ah	So Amazin' Park Jung-ah CJ Music
2006	If You Feel Me'	Suga Free	Just Add Water Bunalo Records
2007	Strong'	Jordyn Taylor	Jordyn Taylor (Single) Strong Interscope Records
2008	Girl Like Me'	Brenda Song	Demo track
2008	Break It Down'	Alyson Stoner	Demo track
2010	Could It Be You "Punk Rock Chick"'	Brandyn H*Wood Bordeaux	Could It Be You (Punk Rock Chick) Ep
2010	Parents Worst Nightmare'	Brandyn H*Wood Bordeaux	Could It Be You (Punk Rock Chick) Ep
2011	Life Of The Party'	Forever The Sickest Kids	Forever the Sickest Kids Universal Motown
2011	Forever Girl'	Forever The Sickest Kids	Forever the Sickest Kids Universal Motown
