= Nice to Meet You =

Nice to Meet You may refer to:

== Music ==
=== Albums ===
- Nice to Meet You (Seeb EP), 2018
- Nice to Meet You (Acoustic Live Solo), an EP by Francesca Michielin, 2016
- Nice to Meet You, by Allen McKenzie, 2000

=== Songs ===
- "Nice to Meet You" (Forever the Sickest Kids song), 2013
- "Nice to Meet You" (Imagine Dragons song), 2024
- "Nice to Meet You" (Myles Smith song), 2024
- "Nice to Meet You" (PinkPantheress song), 2023
- "Nice to Meet You", by Dean Geyer, 2006
- "Nice to Meet You", by G.NA from Black & White, 2011
- "Nice to Meet You", by Vigiland, 2018
- "Nice to Meet You!!", from the anime series Ojamajo Doremi; see Ojamajo Doremi discography

=== Concerts ===
- Nice to Meet You (concert), a one-off concert by Yoasobi, 2021

== Manga ==
- "Nice to Meet You!", chapter 191 of Kuroko's Basketball; see List of Kuroko's Basketball chapters
- "Nice to Meet You", volume 10 and chapter 88 of Medaka Box; see List of Medaka Box chapters

== See also ==
- Greeting
- Nice to Meet Ya (disambiguation)
