= Nikki (song) =

Single by Forever the Sickest Kids

from the album J.A.C.K.
- Released: September 24, 2013
- Genre: Pop punk; power pop; pop rock
- Length: 3:43
- Label: Fearless
- Songwriters: Jonathan Cook; Austin Bello; Caleb Turman; Kyle Burns; Mike Green; Patrick Stump; Neal Avron
- Producer: Mike Green

Forever the Sickest Kids singles chronology
"Nice to Meet You" (2013)	"Nikki" (2013)

Music video
- "Nikki" on YouTube

"Nikki" is a song recorded by American pop punk band Forever the Sickest Kids from their third studio album, J.A.C.K.. The song was released as the album's third and final single on September 24, 2013. It was written by Jonathan Cook, Austin Bello, Caleb Turman, Kyle Burns, Mike Green, Patrick Stump, and Neal Avron.

== Writing and inspiration ==
In an interview with Artistdirect, vocalist and rhythm guitarist Caleb Turman first spoke of the song, "This song was written about a close friend of the band. Needless to say, he has had some very high highs and very low lows. His wife and he have been through it all and Nikki has been his voice of reason, his purpose to make it better and the reason he is where he is now." Regarding the band's friend and his wife, vocalist and bassist Austin Bello said, "I think the song really shows the battle between, I guess, love and hate. It's interesting 'cause they always seem to make it together in the end. That's kind of what the song shows."

Upon co-writing the song with Stump, Turman said the band was originally unaware that he would be working with them, "It was actually one of the most impressive experiences in my life. We sat there and we analyzed every single lyric, every single melody and every single chord progression to the point that we were almost exhausted. We kind of stepped away from it for a little bit. We came back and thought, 'This is really really good.' It was really fun. That guy knows what he is talking about and it was an absolute privilege to work alongside him."

Vocalist Jonathan Cook stated that the band had reached out to Stump to see if he wanted to be a part of the song, with him responding that he was interested in singing on the track. However, it was later confirmed that Stump did not sing on the track.

"Nikki" is among many of the songs that are written and named after a woman that the band personally knows. Other songs by the band include "Becky Starz" from Television Off, Party On, "Hey Brittany" and "Hurricane Haley" from Underdog Alma Mater, and "La La Lainey", from J.A.C.K.

== Music video ==
A music video for the song was announced on August 8, 2013, and premiered September 24 on Vevo. The video was directed by Danny Drysdale and shot in the Dallas–Fort Worth metroplex and Burleson, Texas.

The music video is composed of three scenes involving different couples. The scenes depict a man and woman running toward each other but are blocked by an ongoing train, a young man and woman competing against each other on treadmills at a fitness center, and a man and woman at a horse pen who struggle to open a gate that separates them. The band is shown performing the song in the fitness center, as well as Bello singing his verses by the railroad tracks.

Speaking about the video, Drysdale said, "People are always falling in love and running at each other in slow motion, but all kinds of stuff can get in the way of love, the trick is to still keep it together once the obstacles pass. This video poses the questions and let’s the fans figure it out on their own."

== Reception ==
"Nikki" was met with much praise, with many critics claiming it stood out in a positive way and that it was one of the strongest songs from the album. Matthew Sievers of SF Media compared it to the band's song "Hey Brittany", saying it had "tasteful synth and [an] upbeat melody." Catherine Yi of idobi said that it "presents a potential direction the band could grow in". Tim Sendra of AllMusic claimed the song was one of the few from the album that showed "some ambition and inspiration", saying it had a "Bon Jovi stadium rock chorus".

== Personnel ==
Forever the Sickest Kids

- Jonathan Cook – vocals, songwriter
- Austin Bello – bass guitar, vocals, songwriter
- Caleb Turman – rhythm guitar, vocals, songwriter
- Kyle Burns – drums, percussion, songwriter

Additional personnel

- Patrick Stump – songwriter
- Neal Avron – songwriter
- Mike Green – producer, mixer, songwriter

== Release history ==
Release dates and formats for "Nikki"
Region	Date	Format	Label	Ref.
United States	September 24, 2013	Digital download; stream	Fearless Records	
