= Could It Be You =

Could It Be You may refer to:

- "Could It Be You (Punk Rock Chick)", a song by H*Wood, 2010
- "Could It Be You?", a song by Cascada from Perfect Day, 2007
- "Could It Be You?", a song by the Four Tops, 1956
- "Could It Be You", a song by NSYNC, B-side of "Bye Bye Bye", 2000
- "Could It Be You", a song written by Cole Porter for the musical Something for the Boys, 1943
