= J.A.C.K. =

Studio album by Forever the Sickest Kids
- Released: June 24, 2013
- Recorded: November 2012 – April 2013
- Studio: Dallas, Texas and Los Angeles, California
- Genre: Pop-punk; pop rock; emo pop
- Length: 40:22
- Label: Fearless
- Producer: Mike Green

Forever the Sickest Kids chronology
Forever the Sickest Kids (2011)	J.A.C.K. (2013)

Singles from J.A.C.K.
- 1. "Chin Up Kid" Released: May 7, 2013; 2. "Nice to Meet You" Released: May 28, 2013; 3. "Nikki" Released: September 24, 2013

J.A.C.K. is the third studio album by American pop punk band Forever the Sickest Kids. It is their first release through Fearless Records since their former label, Universal Motown, was shut down, which resulted in the regular Motown being a separate label that still operates as of 2019. It is also the first release not to feature keyboardist Kent Garrison and lead guitarist Marc Stewart. The album was produced by Mike Green and was released on June 25, 2013.

With the departure of their past members and the label switch, the album reflects how the remaining members of the band came together and made positive changes when they were faced with negative challenges in their career and lives. Unlike their previous album, which featured numerous producers and co-writers outside of the band, the majority of the songs on J.A.C.K. were written solely by the members of the band. Mike Green was the main producer for the album, marking the first time the band had ever worked with only one producer for any of their releases.

Lyrically, the album deals with relationships, growing up, self-examination, the importance and values of friendship, stereotypes of America, and staying true to oneself. Like all of their songs, the lyrics are based on the band members' personal lives and experiences.

== Background ==
Only a few months after the release of their self-titled album, Forever the Sickest Kids lost their lead guitarist Marc Stewart due to his then-recent marriage and desire to go back and finish college. The band's keyboardist, Kent Garrison, had also departed from the band earlier in the year to also finish college. In an interview with Alternative Press, vocalist Jonathan Cook stated on their departure, "It's a situation that when we signed, we were all in college anyway. It was inevitable that some of the guys would eventually want to go back to college... So Kent and Marc told us that they wanted to go back to college and they gave us plenty of heads up. Kent texted me last night and Marc texted me last week. It was all on good terms."

Along with losing Garrison and Stewart, the band's label Universal Motown Records was shut down in August 2011 due to the relaunch of Motown Records, which left the band unsigned. Cook admitted in an interview, "It wasn't easy getting rid of band members and our label in one year. It wasn't easy. I'm not going to lie and say there weren't moments where we had to figure out whether or not we wanted to continue. But last year we decided that this all happened for a reason. And we're stronger because of it." The band self-produced the music videos for their singles "I Guess You Can Say Things Are Getting Pretty Serious", "Summer Song", and "Shut the Front Door (Too Young for This)".

During the majority of 2012, it was stated in multiple interviews that the band was offered to sign to numerous record labels. Finally, on September 10, 2012 it was announced that the band had signed to Fearless Records. Under the new label, the band released a cover song of "We Found Love" by Rihanna for the compilation album Punk Goes Pop 5.

Several interviews surfaced revolving around a third studio album, with multiple of them stating how the album would be similar to the band's first album, Underdog Alma Mater, and return to its roots. In an interview with idobi Radio, Cook revealed that the album would be released on June 25, 2013 and one of the tracks was titled "Chin Up Kid". In another interview with Alternative Press, Cook revealed the titles of two more tracks called "My Friends Save Me" and "Nikki". On April 25, a preview of "Chin Up Kid" was released, along with the cover art, track listing, and title of the album, J.A.C.K. A lyric video of "Chin Up Kid" was released on YouTube on May 6, along with the digital download of the song being released the following day. On May 24, the track "Nice to Meet You" was posted on Billboard, with the digital download later being released on May 28.

Pre-order bundles were also released on May 28, which included the album, T-shirts, shorts, autographed posters, stickers, a skateboard deck, wristbands, special made barbecue sauce, and the album on a 12″ transparent red vinyl record, which were limited to 1,000 copies. The first five hundred orders were shipped in a customized pizza box with the band drawn as cartoons on the cover. The band later streamed the entire album on their Facebook page on June 21. On June 24, one day before the album's release, the band posted lyric videos for each song from the album.

== Recording and production ==
Mike Green, who has worked with bands such as Paramore and All Time Low, was the sole producer of J.A.C.K. This was the band's first time working with only one producer on any of their releases and staying in mainly one studio. Cook stated, "...there was a [part] of the album process where we did a couple co-writes in other studios, but a majority of those songs didn't get used." Vocalist and bassist Austin Bello stated that he, Cook, and drummer Kyle Burns all have their own home studios, with Cook later stating that "a good portion of the songs" were written at his home. They began writing the album in May 2012.

Cook revealed that the track "Nikki" was co-written by Patrick Stump of Fall Out Boy, and Stump had expressed interest in singing on the track. However, the band later confirmed that Stump did not sing on the track. Another track, "My Friends Save Me", was revealed to be an acoustic song, having similarities to the band's previous tracks "Coffee Break" and "Forever Girl", from Underdog Alma Mater and Forever the Sickest Kids, respectively.

Vocalist and rhythm guitarist Caleb Turman stated that he and Bello were the primary songwriters, saying, "We would come up with the song concepts, the core melodies and even a lot of the lyrics." Turman spoke of the track "Ritalin (Born in America)", revealing that it was written the night Stewart had departed from the band. He stated, "...We were just feeling very vulnerable as a band... We needed it. It was a venting song." "Playing with Fire" was the group's "most controversial" song on the album between them and their label. According to Bello, there was friction with the intro and tempo change midway through the song, which the label thought it was "too unorthodox for a 'single'-type song."

Before the production of the album, Bello stated, "This is a really cool time for the four of us, because we are about to record, mix, produce and just do everything ourselves. This album is going to have our four opinions only in it. We're actually going to be recording it all and mixing it ourselves with our sounds. It's the most freeing feeling that we've ever had." Cook later commented, "This will be something that if it goes the way we planned, our fans will say that this is the best album we've ever put out. We feel like it's the best record we've ever made."

A total of forty-six songs were written during production, with Cook claiming that the album would consist of twelve songs. However, only eleven were revealed in the track listing. When the album was listed on Amazon, it was revealed that a twelfth track, "Over the Moon", would be included as a bonus track. Another bonus track, "Rebel", was revealed when the album was listed on iTunes. A hidden track was also included on each physical copy of the album. The track is in the pregap and is a short introduction to "Chin Up Kid".

== Singles ==
"Chin Up Kid" was released as the album's lead single on May 7, 2013. A lyric video was originally posted on YouTube by Fearless Records on May 6, with the song being officially released as a digital download and available for purchase on iTunes the following day. The music video premiered on August 15 on fuse and consists of live footage of the band performing on Warped Tour 2013.

"Nice to Meet You" was released as the album's second single on May 28. Billboard originally posted a lyric video of the song on May 24, which was later posted on YouTube by Fearless Records on May 27. A thirty second network television commercial was produced and directed by Bobby Czzowitz to promote the single, and the album’s release. The music video premiered on December 16 on Vevo.

"Nikki" was released as the album's third and final single. The song received a music video, which premiered on September 24 on Vevo.

=== Other songs ===
"Playing With Fire" and "Cross My Heart" were both featured in episodes of the ABC Family series The Vineyard.

"Ritalin (Born in America)" was featured in an episode of the MTV series The Challenge.

== Title and artwork ==
The title of the album, J.A.C.K., was thought of by Cook and is an acronym of the four band members' first names: Jonathan, Austin, Caleb, Kyle. While the band was being interviewed, it was offered that the title should be named J.A.C.K., which compelled the band to reveal that the name had previously been suggested by Cook two days earlier.

As with the band's previous albums, the album cover, artwork, and packaging were all drawn and designed by Burns. He was inspired by the covers of the video game series Grand Theft Auto and had the intention to make the band look like comic book action heroes. Burns originally photographed the band and added his own designs with Photoshop. The woman featured on the back cover of the album was originally an image of Cook, but was changed after Burns added different effects to it.

== Reception ==
Professional ratings
Review scores
Source	Rating
AbsolutePunk	86%
AllMusic	2.5/5 stars
Hit the Floor Magazine	6/10
idobi	2/5 stars
The Music	3.5/5 stars
SF Media	4/5 stars

J.A.C.K. received generally positive reviews. AbsolutePunk praised the album, saying it is "really solid as a whole" and a "very enjoyable listen." Catherine Yi of idobi commended a few tracks, but felt that the album is "unclear about the message it wants to convey" and that it is incomparable to the band's past material. Tim Sendra from AllMusic skewered the lyrics and said the album was overwhelmed with "lightweight pop tunes". Hit the Floor Magazine said the album was a "good release" and that the band "[has] definitely grown and matured", but concluded that "the group [seems] a bit too comfortable with their sound..." The Music wrote, "Some may say that J.A.C.K. is a more mature sound for Forever The Sickest Kids, some may say it is too sweet or even out-dated. The production values keep things interesting however and there are plenty of melodies to get stuck in your head, which is what you would probably expect from a band like this." Matthew Sievers of SF Media remarked, "The album's musicianship is pretty tight and won't make you fall over from its complexity but it is by no means mediocre."

== Track listing ==
All songs produced by Mike Green. All vocals by Jonathan Cook, Austin Bello, and Caleb Turman, except where noted.

No.	Title	Writer(s)	Length
0.	Untitled (pre-gap track)
1.	"Chin Up Kid" (Cook/Turman)	Cook; Bello; Turman; Kyle Burns; Rico Garcia	3:34
2.	"Keep Calm and Don't Let Me Go" (Bello/Cook)	Cook; Bello; Turman; Burns; Garcia	3:33
3.	"Nice to Meet You"	Cook; Bello; Turman; Burns; Garcia; Marc Stewart	3:32
4.	"Nikki" (Bello/Cook)	Cook; Bello; Turman; Burns; Green; Patrick Stump; Neal Avron	3:43
5.	"Ritalin (Born in America)"	Cook; Bello; Turman; Burns	4:50
6.	"Kick It!"	Cook; Bello; Turman; Burns; Green	3:36
7.	"Playing With Fire"	Cook; Bello; Turman; Burns; Green	3:43
8.	"Count On Me (For Nothing)"	Cook; Bello; Turman; Burns; Green	4:02
9.	"La La Lainey"	Cook; Bello; Turman; Burns; Michael McGarity	2:52
10.	"My Friends Save Me" (Cook/Turman)	Cook; Bello; Turman; Burns; Green	3:45
11.	"Cross My Heart" (Bello/Cook)	Cook; Bello; Turman; Burns; Green	3:12
Total length:			40:22

Bonus tracks

Amazon bonus track
No.	Title	Writer(s)	Length
12.	"Over the Moon" (Bello/Cook)	Cook; Bello; Turman; Burns	2:55
Total length:			43:17

iTunes bonus track
No.	Title	Writer(s)	Length
12.	"Rebel" (Cook/Turman)	Cook; Bello; Turman; Burns	3:09
Total length:			43:31

Notes

- A brief introduction track, included as a hidden track, is available on physical copies of the album and can be heard if manually rewound past the beginning of "Chin Up Kid".
- "Ritalin (Born in America)" contains a brief interpolation of "Keep Calm and Don't Let Me Go" in the outro.

== Personnel ==
Forever the Sickest Kids

- Jonathan Cook – vocals, keyboards, synthesizer, piano
- Austin Bello – bass guitar, vocals
- Caleb Turman – guitar, vocals
- Kyle Burns – drums, percussion

Additional musicians

- Lori Bizor – vocals on "Count On Me (For Nothing)"
- Leonnus Franklin – vocals on "Count On Me (For Nothing)"

Production and artwork

- Mike Green – producer, mixer
- Brad Blackwood – mastering engineer at Euphonic Masters
- Chris Foitle – A&R
- Jenny Reader – manager
- Tommy Kwan – manager
- Robi Minies – manager
- Mike Marquis – booking agent at Paradigm Talent Agency
- Micha Breedlove – additional engineer on "Count On Me (For Nothing)" at Wavelight Studios
- Album art and packaging by Kyle Burns

== Charts ==
Chart performance for J.A.C.K.
Chart (2013)	Peak position
US Billboard 200 (Billboard)	94
US Top Alternative Albums (Billboard)	23
US Independent Albums (Billboard)	28
US Top Rock Albums (Billboard)	33

== Release history ==
Release dates and formats for J.A.C.K.
Region	Date	Format	Label	Ref.
United States	June 24, 2013	CD	Fearless	
Various	June 25, 2013	Digital download	Fearless	
Japan	June 26, 2013	CD	Fearless	
Australia	June 28, 2013	CD; digital download	Fearless	
