= Bring It On: Fight to the Finish =

- DVD cover
- Directed by: Bille Woodruff
- Written by: Alyson Fouse; Elena Song
- Produced by: David Brookwell; Sean McNamara; David Buelow
- Starring: Christina Milian
- Cinematography: David Claessen
- Edited by: Michael Jablow; Richard Halsey
- Music by: Andrew Gross
- Production companies: Beacon Pictures; Brookwell McNamara Entertainment
- Distributed by: Universal Studios Home Entertainment
- Release dates: July 31, 2009 (New York International Latino Film Festival); September 1, 2009 (United States)
- Running time: 102 minutes
- Country: United States
- Language: English

Bring It On: Fight to the Finish is a 2009 American teen sports comedy film directed by Bille Woodruff and written by Alyson Fouse and Elena Song. It is the fifth installment in the Bring It On film series and the fourth installment to be released direct-to-video. The film stars Christina Milian, Rachele Brooke Smith, Cody Longo, Vanessa Born, Gabrielle Dennis and Holland Roden.

The story follows Catalina "Lina" Cruz (Milian), an East Los Angeles cheerleader who moves to Malibu and attempts to transform her new school's struggling squad by combining its members with cheerleaders from her former team. The film screened at the New York International Latino Film Festival on July 31, 2009, before Universal Studios Home Entertainment released it on DVD and Blu-ray on September 1. A soundtrack album followed on September 15. The film generated $20.4 million in domestic DVD and Blu-ray sales.

== Plot ==
Catalina "Lina" Cruz is a Cuban-American cheerleader from East Los Angeles who transfers to Malibu after her widowed mother, Isabel, remarries Henry, a wealthy widower. Lina becomes a rival to Avery, the all-star cheerleading captain of the Jaguars after the high school squad, the Sea Lions, did not vote for her to be Captain.

After Lina upsets Sky, her stepsister, she is forced to join The Sea Lions by her mother. She meets Evan, Avery’s brother, practicing basketball and impresses him. The Sea Lions immediately vote her Captain and she recruits Gloria, her friend from East L.A, to move to her house and help them.

After a team member from the Sea Lions quits, Lina calls her other friend, Treyvonetta ("Trey") to assist them. At a basketball game, the Sea Lions perform but fail and are outshined by The Jaguars, led by Avery. Lina takes the Sea Lions to East L.A. to practice their dancing. She later meets Evan waiting for her there, and Victor, Gloria's boyfriend, befriends him.

The next day, Lina suggests the Sea Lions compete in the All Star Championship. After the team agrees to double up their practices, The Sea Lions are invited to a Rodeo Drive Divas party. Following practice, Gloria and Trey are expelled when Avery goes to the principal and exposes them for joining the school without approval. Lina refuses to go to the dance, but is confronted by Sky. Evan takes Lina as his date to the party, where Gloria and Trey attend. Lina and Avery proceed to have a dance off and Avery hurls multiple racial slurs at her. As Lina leaves, she breaks up with Evan, and quits being captain of The Sea Lions.

Gloria and Trey encourage her to stay in Malibu and remain as captain. The following day, half of the Sea Lions squad quits because of Lina's routines and practices. After being taunted by Avery and Kayla, Lina and the remaining Sea Lions meet Gloria at a gym she convinced to sponsor the Sea Lions and some of the members of The East L.A. Rough Riders as an all star squad. By combining the Sea Lions and the Rough Riders, they become the Dream Team. The next day, Evan confesses his feelings and kisses her. Lina and her team make it to the final round of the All Star Championship and end up defeating The Jaguars, after which Avery breaks down. Lina returns home with Trey, Gloria, Christina and Sky, claiming all of them as her cheer sisters.

== Cast ==
- Christina Milian as Catalina "Lina" Cruz
- Rachele Brooke Smith as Avery Whitbourne
- Cody Longo as Evan Whitbourne
- Vanessa Born as Gloria
- Gabrielle Dennis as Treyvonetta (Trey)
- Holland Roden as Skye
- Nikki SooHoo as Christina
- Meagan Holder as Kayla
- Laura Cerón as Isabel Cruz
- David Starzyk as Henry
- Brandon Gonzales as Victor
- Prima J as Themselves

== Production ==
=== Casting and characterization ===
Milian said she accepted the role because she was already a fan of the Bring It On films and regarded Lina as a positive character for her younger female audience. She also wanted the character to address prejudice while retaining a confident personality. The film marked both Milian's first role as a Latina character and the first time she spoke Spanish in a film.

Milian had previously worked with Woodruff on a music video and did not audition for the film. She instead participated in casting sessions for some of the other roles, including Lina's love interest.

Costume designer Ruth E. Carter allowed the cast to give input on their characters' clothing. Born said that Milian also helped design some of the outfits and developed a particular visual style for Lina and her friends.

=== Training and choreography ===
Tony Gonzalez, who had worked on Bring It On: All or Nothing and Bring It On: In It to Win It, returned as choreographer and associate producer. Milian trained for one month, five days a week, and learned approximately 20 choreographed routines. She described the preparation as physically demanding and said the cast used the rehearsal period to bond.

=== Filming ===
Filming took place in both Malibu and Los Angeles in late 2008. Filming included Zuma Beach, the interior gymnasium scenes at California State University, Northridge, and the East Los Angeles scenes at Roosevelt High School in Boyle Heights. The Gavilan College cheerleading team and its coach, Rachel Becerra, were invited to appear after the casting director learned about the squad through a mutual acquaintance. The team performed one of its routines during the film's cheer-off sequence.

== Music ==
Bring It On: Fight to the Finish

Soundtrack album by various artists
- Released: September 15, 2009
- Genre: Dance-pop
- Length: 29:50
- Label: Arsenal Records
- Producer: Paul DiFranco (executive)

Andrew Gross composed the film's score. A 10-track soundtrack album was released by Arsenal Records on September 15, 2009. Milian contributed "I Gotta Get to You", which plays over the closing sequence; she also filmed a music video for the song specifically for the film.

Bring It On: Fight to the Finish: Music From and Inspired by the Motion Picture
No.	Title	Artist	Length
1.	"I Gotta Get to You"	Christina Milian	4:05
2.	"Popular"	The Veronicas	2:43
3.	"Corazon (You're Not Alone)"	Prima J	3:04
4.	"Bounce"	Fizz & Boog	3:59
5.	"Get It Girl"	World's First	4:00
6.	"Whine Up (Johnny Vicious Spanish Mix)"	Kat DeLuna featuring Elephant Man	3:18
7.	"Whoa Oh! (Me vs. Everyone)"	Forever the Sickest Kids	3:25
8.	"Dale"	L.A. Rouge	2:27
9.	"Mueve La Caderas"	Carmen Carter, Andrew Gross and Nelson Marquez	1:04
10.	"Viva La Celebration"	Andrew Gross	1:45
Total length:			29:50

== Release ==
The film held its world premiere at the New York International Latino Film Festival on July 31, 2009. It released in the United States on DVD and Blu-ray on September 1, 2009. The home-media editions included deleted scenes, a feature on the cast's cheerleading preparation, a behind-the-scenes featurette, a video diary hosted by Milian and an episode of The Chicas Project.

The film grossed $19.8 million from DVD and $596,335 from Blu-ray, for a combined total of approximately $20.4 million. The film made its television premiere on ABC Family on January 17, 2010, following a marathon of three earlier films in the series.

== Reception ==
Contemporary reviews were divided. Angela Tiene of Common Sense Media called it "predictable at best" and found its racial and class contrasts "a bit heavy-handed", but wrote that its themes of friendship, loyalty and hard work remained clear and that franchise fans would enjoy the Latin- and hip-hop-influenced cheer sequences. Kam Williams of BlackFilm.com called the story "predictable" but "well-enough executed to entertain the tweeners in the desired demographic". He considered the film better than the previous three sequels and praised its high-energy soundtrack.

Kenneth Brown of Blu-ray.com gave the film itself one star out of five and the Blu-ray release two out of five. He compared watching it to "watching a high school student-film" and criticized the performances and dialogue, although he found the disc's video presentation comparatively stronger.

=== Retrospective assessments ===
Later appraisals also differed over the film's handling of race and class. In a 2016 retrospective for Den of Geek, Kirsten Howard called it "a cut above the rest" and "probably the best" of the four direct-to-video sequels then released, praising Milian's casting, the more grounded story and its multicultural theme. By contrast, LaToya Ferguson of Complex described the sequels as "fuel and fire for stereotypes and racism galore" and criticized this film's racial insults and visual treatment of East Los Angeles. She nevertheless placed it third in her ranking of the five films released at that time, behind the original and All or Nothing.
