= Forever the Sickest Kids (album) =

Studio album by Forever the Sickest Kids
- Released: March 1, 2011
- Recorded: 2010–11
- Studio: The House of Loud Studios, Elmwood Park, New Jersey; Crystal Clear Studios, Dallas, Texas; This is Care Of Studios, New York City, New York
- Genre: Pop punk; pop rock; power pop; synthpop
- Length: 36:06
- Label: Universal Motown
- Producer: David Bendeth; Mark Jackson; Ian Scott; Aaron Accetta; Shep Goodman; Geoff Rockwell

Forever the Sickest Kids chronology
The Weekend: Friday (2009)	Forever the Sickest Kids (2011)	J.A.C.K. (2013)

Singles from Forever the Sickest Kids
- 1. "Keep On Bringing Me Down" Released: September 14, 2010; 2. "I Guess You Can Say Things Are Getting Pretty Serious" Released: April 5, 2011; 3. "Summer Song" Released: June 26, 2011

Forever the Sickest Kids is the second studio album by American pop punk band Forever the Sickest Kids, released on March 1, 2011. It is their last release through Universal Motown Records, and also last to feature members Kent Garrison and Marc Stewart. Following the release of their 2009 EP The Weekend: Friday, the band worked on material for what was originally a continuation of the EP but instead wrote more songs than intended, and scrapped the idea to work on a second full-length record. The album received mixed reviews from critics who commended the band's attempt at maturity with diverse musicianship and catchability but found it inconsistent. Forever the Sickest Kids debuted at number 33 on the Billboard 200 and spawned three singles: "Keep On Bringing Me Down", "I Guess You Can Say Things Are Getting Pretty Serious" and "Summer Song".

== Background ==
During the writing of the songs, a five-piece EP entitled The Weekend: Saturday was originally intended for the next release from the band, as part of their continuation of their previous release, The Weekend: Friday. In March 2010, guitarist Marc Stewart confirmed that the band finished writing material for the EP and began demoing songs for The Weekend: Sunday. Keyboardist Kent Garrison described the three part EP as "a modern day pop/rock concept record." On September 7, 2010, it was announced that The Weekend: Saturday would be released on October 19, and the band premiered a new track titled "Keep On Bringing Me Down" on September 14. However, after numerous songs were written, it was decided they release a full-length album instead of the EP. When speaking about the album, vocalist Jonathan Cook stated, "This is like, a year and a half in the making with some different planning. We thought we might put it out as an EP, five songs a piece. And then, we just started writing more and more songs, before you knew it we had eleven songs that we were passionate about. So, we're like, "Why not put it out as a full-length album?". Bassist Austin Bello told Indie Vision Music that the concept of the series of EPs could turn into an acoustic EP, while Cook added could be Christmas or covers EP. This album is the last to feature keyboardist Kent Garrison and guitarist Marc Stewart.

== Composition ==
The group began working on the album with producers David Bendeth and John Bender in 2010 in New Jersey, New York, Irving and Fort Worth. They worked with other producers including Mark Jackson, Ian Scott, Aaron Accetta, Shep Goodman and Geoff Rockwell. The band also had a hand in production, drummer Kyle Burns stated, "It's an emotional process, but also a physical one too [...] It's very well put together and tighter sounding; we've grown as a band in our instrumentation and showmanship, and you can hear it." The album starts out with "Keep On Bringing Me Down", which Alternative Press described as a "picture-perfect uptempo pop-punk" song, that deals with a crying out question as to why the world brings people down. Dallas Observer noted how the song "showcase a sort of early '80s Bon Jovi appeal." "I Guess You Can Say Things Are Getting Pretty Serious" has been described as a "high-voltage pop-tune", driven by Cook's addictive vocals and distorted guitars by Caleb Turman and Marc Stewart. "Life of the Party" is an electronic, upbeat, dance-influenced song. "Robots & Aliens" is an upbeat, feel-good song that deals with one waiting for another in a relationship, with AbsolutePunk stating the song could've been a "huge radio hit". "King for a Day" is a softer tune, equipped with synth and a catchy chorus, dealing with the wish of being king for a day in order to give a girl anything. "Good Life" is a song that deals with the common subject of desiring the good life.

The seventh track, "Same Dumb Excuse (Nothing to Lose)", is another electronic, dance-influenced song with Cook singing about how one in a relationship should be brave and confident instead of feeling they have anything to lose. Cook has stated this is his favorite song from the album. "Bipolar, Baby!" is an electronic pop-influenced song that deals with a girl who poorly treats a relationship. "Summer Song" is an upbeat, pop rock song revolving around the joy and happiness of summer. "Forever Girl", which was compared to the band's previous song "Coffee Break" from Underdog Alma Mater, is an acoustic song sung by Turman dedicating love to a girlfriend. The closing track, "What Happened to Emotion? (Killing Me)", is a big, powerful, ballad that deals with how one feels they deserve to be treated better. "This song defines our sound best," Cook stated.

== Release ==
The first single released from the album, "Keep On Bringing Me Down", was released on September 14, 2010. The track listing and album artwork were later revealed on the band's website when the album was made available for pre-order. On their tour during December, the band began to perform the songs "I Guess You Can Say Things Are Getting Pretty Serious" and "Life of the Party." On February 10, 2011, the band released an instrumental version of the track, "What Happened to Emotion? (Killing Me)" on their official YouTube account. Five days later, the track "Forever Girl" was also released from their YouTube account. On February 26, the group made their self-titled studio album available for streaming on MySpace. On April 5, "I Guess You Can Say Things Are Getting Pretty Serious" was released as the second single and was sent for radio airplay. A music video for the song was released by the band in June. On June 26, the track "Summer Song" was released as the third single and was also followed by a music video on July 5. The group released "King for a Day" for digital download as the first promotional single. A Japanese bonus track edition of the album features "Get Over Yourself", which was previously released on their MySpace page on March 23, 2010, as a free download.

Garrison's departure was announced on January 10, 2011, stating he wanted to "pursue other opportunities." Stewart's announcement of leaving the band was put on his Twitter account on September 22, 2011. The band later confirmed his departure, due to his recent marriage. The band's friend and crew member, Rico Garcia, became a touring member to replace Stewart during performances. The band later stated that Garrison and Stewart had both planned on heading back to college as further reasons for leaving the band. In October, the group headlined a tour in the UK. The group also supported Simple Plan on their headlining US tour in October and November. In September 2012, the group performed at the Bazooka Rocks Festival in the Philippines.

This would also be the group's last Motown album before the label was separated from Universal Motown Records, shutting down Universal Motown Republic Group in the process.

== Critical reception ==
Professional ratings
Review scores
Source	Rating
AbsolutePunk	(62%)
AllMusic	2.5/5 stars
Alternative Addiction	3.5/5 stars
Alternative Press	3/5 stars
The Music	1/5 stars
Rockfreaks.net	3/10 stars
Sputnikmusic	(2.3/5)

The album received mostly mixed reviews. While most music critics commended the diversity and catchiness of the album and at the more mature attempts made by the band, some still felt it wasn't consistent and contained clichéd lyrics and sound. Many reviewers praised Cook's vocals, calling them "assured and punchy" and were pleased with the absence of Auto-Tune, which was occasionally used in the band's previous releases. Tim Sendra of AllMusic wrote, "His impassioned yelping on the rockers and his twee crooning on the ballads are one of the album's highlights."

Many reviewers heavily criticized the song "Life of the Party". Davey Boy of Sputnikmusic stated that out of all the songs on the album, the song was "the most unbearable and childish". Sendra stated that it was "clichéd and clumsy." Ryan Gardner of AbsolutePunk wrote that the song was "littered with auto-tune, electronic drums, and synth over dosage. The result: arguably one of the worst songs FTSK have ever penned, channeling Good Morning Revival-era Good Charlotte, which is never a good thing." Pete Freedman of Dallas Observer called it "Far East Movement-Lite." Alternative Addiction was critical on "King for a Day" and "Forever Girl" stating the songs "miss badly." The Music wrote a negative response on the album, writing, "Once you accept the pop route the band have opted for with this record it is clear that they are actually quite good at forming radio friendly puffs of music [...] however, Forever The Sickest Kids are no longer potential creators of something worthwhile."

On a positive note, reviews claimed "Keep On Bringing Me Down", "I Guess You Can Say Things Are Getting Pretty Serious", and "What Happened to Emotion? (Killing Me)" were the best tracks on the album. Gardner said of "Keep On Bringing Me Down" and "I Guess You Can Say Things Are Getting Pretty Serious" that they "begin the record on a high note, leaving the listener bouncing around to poppy cravings." Evan Lucy of Alternative Press wrote of "Keep On Bringing Me Down" that it "might be their best song since 2008's Underdog Alma Mater." "What Happened to Emotion? (Killing Me)" was described by Gardner as "simply bombastic." He continued by saying, "Cook's melody over the soaring guitars makes the track huge; the changes from fast to slow make for a truly solid number, and easily one of the best tracks on the record." Freedman stated on the overall album that "these songs, as with the disc as a whole, show substantial musical growth on the band's part; there's an intricacy at play that never before existed in this outfit's new material, which proves more poppy than punky." Alternative Addiction praised the tracks "Keep on Bringing Me Down", "Aliens & Robots", and "Bipolar Baby!" calling them "early favorites."

== Track listing ==
All vocals by Bello, Cook, and Turman, except where noted.

No.	Title	Writer(s)	Producer(s)	Length
1.	"Keep On Bringing Me Down"	Jonathan Cook; Austin Bello; Caleb Turman; Kyle Burns; Marc Stewart; Kent Garrison	David Bendeth	3:37
2.	"I Guess You Can Say Things Are Getting Pretty Serious"	Cook; Bello; Turman; Burns; Stewart; Garrison	Bendeth	3:07
3.	"Life of the Party"	Cook; Bello; Turman; Stewart; Mark Jackson; Ian Scott	Shep Goodman; Aaron Accetta; Jackson; Scott	2:58
4.	"Robots & Aliens"	Cook; Bello; Turman; Stewart; Geoff Rockwell	Goodman; Accetta; Rockwell	3:12
5.	"King for a Day"	Bello; Turman; Zac Maloy	Goodman; Accetta; Rockwell	3:27
6.	"Good Life"	Cook; Bello; Turman; Stewart; Bendeth; Goodman	Bendeth	3:21
7.	"Same Dumb Excuse (Nothing to Lose)" (Cook)	Claude Kelly; Rasmus Bille Bahncke; Jared Scharff; Ross Golan; Daniel Wilenski	theSinglesClub	3:16
8.	"Bipolar, Baby!"	Cook; Bello; Turman; Stewart; Garrison; Bendeth	Bendeth	3:11
9.	"Summer Song" (Cook)	Cook; Bello; Turman; Stewart; Tim Pagnotta	Bendeth	3:01
10.	"Forever Girl" (Turman)	Bello; Turman; Jackson; Scott	Goodman; Jackson; Scott	3:13
11.	"What Happened to Emotion? (Killing Me)"	Cook; Bello; Turman; Stewart; Goodman	Goodman; Accetta	3:43
Total length:				36:06

Japanese bonus track
No.	Title	Writer(s)	Length
12.	"Get Over Yourself" (Cook/Turman)	Cook; Bello; Turman	3:26
Total length:			39:32

== Personnel ==
Credits adapted from AllMusic.

Forever the Sickest Kids

- Jonathan Cook – vocals, piano on "What Happened to Emotion? (Killing Me)"
- Austin Bello – bass guitar, vocals
- Caleb Turman – rhythm guitar, vocals, acoustic guitar on "Forever Girl"
- Marc Stewart – lead guitar
- Kent Garrison – keyboards, synthesizers
- Kyle Burns – drums, percussion

Production

- Aaron Accetta – producer, mixing, programming
- Dan Korneff – mixing
- David Bendeth – arrangement, mixing, producer
- Elizabeth Vago – A&R
- Femio Hernández – assistant mixing
- Geoff Rockwell – producer
- Ian Scott – producer
- Jennifer Beal – production direction
- Mark Jackson – producer
- Meredeth Oliver – A&R
- Mike Caffrey – engineering
- Miles Walker – mixing
- Mindy White – photography
- Shep Goodman – A&R, mixing, producer
- The Singles Club – engineering, producer
- Tom Coyne – mastering
- Tom Lord-Alge – mixing
- Album art and layout by Kyle Burns

== Charts ==
Chart performance for Forever the Sickest Kids
Chart (2011)	Peak position
Canadian Albums (Billboard)	92
US Billboard 200 (Billboard)	33
US Top Alternative Albums (Billboard)	5
US Top Rock Albums (Billboard)	8

== Release history ==
Release dates and formats for Forever the Sickest Kids
Region	Date	Edition	Format	Label	Ref.
Various	March 1, 2011	CD; digital download	Standard	Universal Motown	
Japan	March 2, 2011	CD	Bonus track	Universal Motown	
Japan	May 20, 2008	CD	Standard	Universal Motown	
