= Nice to Meet Ya =

Nice to Meet Ya may refer to:

- "Nice to Meet Ya" (Niall Horan song), 2019
- "Nice to Meet Ya" (Meghan Trainor song), featuring Nicki Minaj, 2020
- "Nice to Meet Ya", a 2021 song by Wes Nelson featuring Yxng Bane

== See also ==
- Nice to Meet You (disambiguation)
