= Whoa Oh! (Me vs. Everyone) =

Single by Forever the Sickest Kids

from the album Underdog Alma Mater
- B-side: "Hurricane Haley"
- Released: April 1, 2008
- Recorded: 2007
- Studio: Red Bull Studios, Santa Monica, California
- Genre: Pop punk
- Length: 3:24
- Label: Universal Motown; Island
- Songwriters: Austin Bello; Caleb Turman; Jonathan Cook
- Producers: Geoff Rockwell; Matt Squire

Forever the Sickest Kids singles chronology
"Whoa Oh! (Me vs. Everyone)" (2008)	"She's a Lady" (2008)

Music video
- "Whoa Oh! (Me vs. Everyone)" on YouTube

Remix featuring Selena Gomez cover

"Whoa Oh! (Me vs. Everyone)" is the debut single by Forever the Sickest Kids, released on April 1, 2008. It is from their debut album Underdog Alma Mater. The song's video aired on MTV's TRL on June 24. The song reached No. 38 on the Billboard Mainstream Top 40 chart. The remix version featuring Selena Gomez was released digitally on May 26, 2009. The song has been featured in numerous Nerf commercials, as well as on the American reality television series, The Hills and on the 2009 film, Bring It On: Fight to the Finish.

== Composition ==
"Whoa Oh! (Me vs. Everyone)" was written by Austin Bello, Caleb Turman and Jonathan Cook while production was handled by Geoff Rockwell and Matt Squire. In 2009, the band invited Selena Gomez to be on a duet version of the song. At the time of the track's recording session, Gomez had just started production on her debut album, Kiss & Tell, as a pop-rock project called Selena Gomez & the Scene. A behind the scenes video of the band and Gomez working on the song together was released on May 28, 2009.

== Release ==
"Whoa Oh! (Me vs. Everyone)" was made available for streaming on the band's MySpace page on March 18, 2008. The song was released digitally as a single on April 1, 2008. The song was serviced to contemporary hit radio in the US on April 15. The European release of the single features a B-Side track, "Hurricane Haley", and it was released in the United Kingdom on October 13, via Island Records.

== Accolades ==
Accolades for "Whoa Oh! (Me vs. Everyone)"
Publication	Country	Accolade	Year	Rank	Ref.
ALTop 20	United States	Top 20 Songs of 2008	2008	10	

== Music video ==
The music video for "Whoa Oh! (Me vs. Everyone)" premiered on April 10, 2008, and was directed by Shane Drake. The video shows the band playing near a drag strip with an airplane in the background. The video goes through showing vocalist Jonathan Cook, falling for a race car girl. Jonathan then sneaks into a trailer of a race car driver and gets into uniform. Jonathan gets into a car, precedes to race but crashes. As he exits the race car, the girl rushes to his side to give him a kiss. He then leans in and gives a thumbs up. The video ends with the band walking away into the sunset.

== Live performances ==
The group performed the track live on Late Night with Conan O'Brien, on June 12, 2008.

== Chart performance ==
"Whoa Oh! (Me vs. Everyone)" debuted on the US Mainstream Top 40 at number 40. The following week later, the song rose up by two positions, peaking at number 38 on the chart.

== Track listing ==
CD single
No.	Title	Length
1.	"Whoa Oh! (Me vs. Everyone)"	3:24

European single
No.	Title	Length
1.	"Whoa Oh! (Me vs. Everyone)"	3:24
2.	"Hurricane Haley"	3:42

Digital download
No.	Title	Length
1.	"Whoa Oh! (Me vs. Everyone)" (featuring Selena Gomez)	3:29
2.	"Whoa Oh! (Me vs. Everyone)" (The Making Of featuring Selena Gomez)	3:45

== Personnel ==
Credits adapted from CD liner notes.

Forever the Sickest Kids

- Jonathan Cook – vocals
- Austin Bello – bass guitar, vocals
- Caleb Turman – rhythm guitar, vocals
- Marc Stewart – lead guitar
- Kent Garrison – keyboards, synthesizers
- Kyle Burns – drums, percussion

Production

- Matt Squire – producer, engineering
- Geoff Rockwell – producer
- Tom Lord-Alge – mixing
- Tom Coyne – mastering
- Eric Stenman – engineering
- Femio Hernandez – assist mixing engineering

== Charts ==
=== Weekly charts ===
Weekly chart performance for "Whoa Oh! (Me vs. Everyone)"
Chart (2008)	Peak position
Japan (Hot 100 Airplay)	1
US Mainstream Top 40 (Billboard)	38

=== Year-end charts ===
Year-end chart performance for "Whoa Oh! (Me vs. Everyone)"
Chart (2008)	Position
Singapore Airplay (Mediacorp)	57

== Release history ==
Release dates and formats for "Whoa Oh! (Me vs. Everyone)"
Region	Date	Version	Format	Label	Ref.
United States	April 1, 2008	Original	Digital download	Universal Motown	
United States	April 15, 2008	Original	Contemporary hit radio	Universal Motown	
United Kingdom	October 13, 2008	Original	CD	Island	
Ireland	October 27, 2008	Original	CD	Island	
United Kingdom	October 27, 2008	Original	Digital download	Island	
Various	May 26, 2009	Remix	Digital download	Universal Motown	
