= What Do You Want from Me (Forever the Sickest Kids song) =

- Cover of the single's 2010 Diary of a Wimpy Kid re-release

Single by Forever the Sickest Kids

from the album The Weekend: Friday and Diary of a Wimpy Kid soundtrack
- Released: October 30, 2009
- Recorded: 2009
- Genre: Pop punk; power pop; pop rock; pop; neon pop
- Length: 2:37
- Label: Universal Republic
- Songwriters: Austin Bello; Caleb Turman; Shep Goodman
- Producer: Matt Squire

Forever the Sickest Kids singles chronology
"She's a Lady" (2008)	"What Do You Want from Me" (2009)	"She Likes (Bittersweet Love)" (2010)

"What Do You Want from Me" is a single by the American band Forever the Sickest Kids. It is the lead single from their EP The Weekend: Friday. The song was first released on October 30, 2009, via the group's MySpace page.

It has been featured in numerous Nerf commercials and in the ending credits of the film Diary of a Wimpy Kid, where it was re-released with minor changes in the lyrics. The song was featured on Apple's QuickTime media player application.

== Composition and lyrics ==
"What Do You Want From Me" was written by Austin Bello, Caleb Turman and Shep Goodman, while Michael Goodman handled production. Guitarist Marc Stewart spoke about the song's meaning with Alternative Press. He stated, "This song is about not listening to everyone around you and realizing it's about you and not what others think you should be. We wrote it during a time in our lives when everyone was trying to push us in different ways."

On March 19, 2010, the single was re-released for the film Diary of a Wimpy Kid, entitled "What Do You Want from Me (Diary of a Wimpy Kid Mix)". This version features slight changes in the lyrics from the original version to make the song more kid-oriented. The verse "I don't wanna waste my time again/By getting wasted with so-called friends", was changed to "I don't wanna waste my time again/By getting crazy with so-called friends." The second verse, "And I've been thinking that we've been drinking in hopes to maintain our sanity", was changed to, "And I've been thinking that we've been sinking in hopes to maintain our sanity." The lyric "Ripped my heart out of my chest" is changed to "Wear my heart out of my chest."

== Music video ==
The music video for the song was filmed on November 12, 2009, at the Starland Ballroom and released on December 14, 2009, via MTV. The band's manager (played by Verne Troyer) informs the band that they need a change in their image. The band is skeptical at first, but goes along with the idea. The manager has them perform their song in many different fashions, such as hip-hop, goth, and being dressed in neon colors, all of which fail among their audience. The band then decides to perform with their original style. When this finally gains the audience's approval, the manager claims to the band, "See? I told you guys. Just be yourself." David Brodsky directed the music video.

== Track listing ==
Album version
No.	Title	Length
1.	"What Do You Want From Me"	2:37

Digital download
No.	Title	Length
1.	"What Do You Want From Me" (Diary of a Wimpy Kid Mix)	2:39

== Personnel ==
Credits for "What Do You Want from Me" adapted from the album's liner notes.

Forever the Sickest Kids

- Jonathan Cook – lead vocals
- Austin Bello – bass, vocals
- Caleb Turman – rhythm guitar
- Kyle Burns – drums
- Marc Stewart – lead guitar
- Kent Garrison – keyboards, synthesizers

Production

- Matt Squire – producer
- Eric Stenman – recording engineer
- Travis Huff – engineer
- Tom Lord-Alge – mixing
- Femio Hernandez – assistant mixing

== Release history ==
Release dates and formats for "What Do You Want from Me"
Region	Date	Format	Label	Ref.
Various	March 19, 2010	Digital download	Universal Motown	
