= List of Medaka Box chapters =

The manga series Medaka Box is written by Nisio Isin and illustrated by Akira Akatsuki. Medaka Box was published in Shueisha's Weekly Shōnen Jump magazine between May 11, 2009, and April 27, 2013. As of June 4, 2013, Shueisha has compiled its chapters into 22 tankōbon volumes.

== Volume list ==
No.	Title	Japanese release date	Japanese ISBN
1	The School Council in Action; Seitokai o Shikkōsuru (生徒会を執行する)	October 2, 2009	978-4-08-874776-7
001. "The School Council in Action" (生徒会を執行する, Seitokai o Shikkōsuru); 002. "That Will Suffice" (それでよいのだ, Sore de Yoi no da); 003. "I Guess You're the Right One" (確かにお前は, Tashika ni Omae wa); 004. "That's Unnecessary Attitude" (余計な真似だよ, Yokei na Mane da yo); 005. "If You Want To Express Your Gratitude" (感謝していると言うのならば, Kanshashiteiru to Iu no Naraba); 006. "I Won't Tell You Not To Lose" (負けるなとは言わん, Makeruna to wa Iwan); 007. "In the Middle of It All" (途中からでも, Tochuu Kara Demo)
2	I Never Expected You to Understand; Wakatte Moraō Nante Omottenai yo (わかってもらおーなんて思ってないよ)	December 4, 2009	978-4-08-874778-1
008. "Stole the Show" (もっていかれた, Motte Ikareta); 009. "Go Ahead And Eat" (食ってよい, Kutte Yoi); 010. "You Could've Drowned" (溺死確実の危険な行為だ, Dekishi Kakujitsu no Kiken na Kōi da); 011. "I Never Expected You to Understand" (わかってもらおーなんて思ってないよ, Wakatte Moraō Nante Omottenai yo); 012. "I Like You More Than Money" (お金より好き, Okane Yori Suki); 013. "Do You Do This With Everyone?" (誰にでもこういうことするの？, Dare ni Demo Kōiu Koto suru no?); 014. "It's Just Clothing" (たかが服だろ, Taka ga Fuku daro); 015. "Butting Heads" (相容れねえ, Aiirenē); 016. "Looking Down on People as Fundamentally Depraved" (見下し性悪説だ, Mikudashi Seiakusetsu da)
3	I Am The Student Council President; Watashi wa Seito Kaichō da zo (私は生徒会長だぞ)	February 4, 2010	978-4-08-874799-6
017. "Because I Decided to Try Hard" (私はがんばると決めた, Watashi wa Ganbaru to Kimeta); 018. "That's Not Fair" (それはズルイぜ, Sore wa Zuruize); 019. "Kurokami Medaka's 4th Trump Card" (黒神めだかの真骨頂その④, Kurokami Medaka no Shinkocchō Sono Yon); 020. "I Am The Student Council President" (私は生徒会長だぞ, Watashi wa Seito Kaichō da zo); 021. "You Went Overboard" (やり過ぎだ, Yarisugi da); 022. "What Do You Guys Think?" (君たちはどう思いました？, Kimitachi wa Dō Omoimashita?); 023. "4136163735641?" ("Did You Think You Were the Strongest Here or Something?" (お前最強ってなんだと思う？, Omae Saikyō tte Nanda to Omou?) in Myouga Unzen's self-created language); 024. "Everyone Says That" (みんなそう言うのさ, Minna Sō Iu no sa); 025. "It's Never Been Done to Me" (されたことはなかったから, Sareta Koto wa Nakatta Kara)
4	My Sister, My Sister, My Sister! Imōto, Imōto, Imōto da! (妹・妹・妹だ！)	April 2, 2010	978-4-08-870026-7
026. "My Sister, My Sister, My Sister!" (妹・妹・妹だ！, Imōto, Imōto, Imōto da!); 027. "The Things That Happen At The School I Attend" (私の通う学園での出来事だ, Watashi no Kayō Gakuen de no Dekigoto da); 028. "We're Waiting For You" (君を待ってくれてるさ, Kimi o Matte Kureteru sa); 029. "LA" (あん, An); 030. "Sigh, What a Pain" (いやあ困った困った, Iyā Komatta Komatta); 031. "I Won't Increase" (増えるーーのではなく, Fueru -- no de wa naku); 032. "This is a Touching Session!" (とても楽しい触れ合いだ, Totemo Tanoshĩ Fureai da); 033. "So I'll Kill You" (だから殺す, Dakara Korosu); 034. "Wont Kill Your Life" (君の命は殺せない, Kimi no Inochi wa Korosenai)
5	He is Normal Cool; Futsū ni Kakkō Ii (普通に格好いい)	August 12, 2010	978-4-08-870076-2
035. "He is Normal Cool" (普通に格好いい, Futsū ni Kakkō Ii); 036. "Lets Be Wary of Bad Skin" (肌荒れには気をつけましょう, Hadaare ni wa Kiotsukemashō); 037. "I'm Sorry But I'm Making It My Business!" (悪いが関知させてもらうよ, Warui ga Kanchisasete Morau yo); 038. "Both Being Bad, And Destroying Things" (不良さも破壊さも, Warusa mo Kowasa mo); 039. "For Abnormals To Be Free" (異常の自由のために, Abunōmaru no Jiyū no Tame ni); 040. "I'll Be There!" (どこにだって現れる, Doko ni Datte Arawareru); 041. "The Only Thing Greater Than I" (俺より上なのは, Ore Yori Ue na no wa); 042. "Searching The World Over" (世界中探したって, Sekaijū Sagashitatte); 043. "But The You Of The Past" (だけど昔のあなたは, Dakedo Mukashi no Anata wa)
6	Why Were You Born? Omae wa Nanno Tame ni Umaretekita? (お前は何のために生まれてきた？)	September 3, 2010	978-4-08-870106-6
044. "We Have To Run" (もう逃げるしかねーぜ, Mō Nigeru Shikanēze); 045. "Take The Shortcut" (ショートカットできるんだから, Shōtokatto Dekirun Dakara); 046. "Who Are You?" (誰だお前, Dare da Omae); 047. "You're All Idiots" (みんなばかだ, Minna Baka da); 048. "Within The Entire Party, You're..." (「十三組」の中で誰よりも, Pāti no Naka de Dare Yori mo); 049. "I am Not" (ではありません, De wa Arimasen); 050. "You're Medaka-chan's Enemy" (めだかちゃんの敵だ, Medaka-chan no Teki da); 051. "Then You Tell Me" (だったら私に教えるがよい, Dattara Watashi ni Oshieru ga Yoi); 052. "Why Were You Born?" (お前は何のために生まれてきた？, Omae wa Nanno Tame ni Umaretekita?)
7	This is The Flask Plan; Kore ga Furasuko Keikaku da (これがフラスコ計画だ)	November 4, 2010	978-4-08-870129-5
053. "This is The Flask Plan" (これがフラスコ計画だ, Kore ga Furasuko Keikaku da); 054. "What on Earth Are You?" (お前は一体何なんだ, Omae wa Ittai Nannanda); 055. You Did Something Bad (悪いことをしたら, Warui Koto o Shitara); 056. "I am Your Superior From Middle School" (中学時代の先輩ですよ, Chūgaku Jidai no Senpai desu yo); 057. "I Dislike Being Frank" (ぶっちゃけ嫌いだよな, Bucchake Kirai da yo na); 058. "Let's Be Friends Everyone" (みんな友達になってね, Minna Tomodachi ni Natte ne); 059. "Being Loved is Better Than Being Hated" (嫌われるより好かれる方が, Kirawareru Yori Sukareru Hō ga); 060. "Because A Girl's Love is..." (だって女の子の愛は, Datte Onna no Ko no Ai wa); 061. "Don't You Dare Talk About Love" (愛だの恋だのほざくのは, Ai da no Koi da no Hozaku no wa)
8	I Like It; Suki daze (好きだぜ)	December 29, 2010	978-4-08-870166-0
062. "I'm not a Hero" (英雄じゃないんだぜ, Eiyū ja naindaze); 063. "The Minus 13's Class Motto" (マイナス十三組のモットーだよ, Mainasu Jūsan Kumi no Mottō da yo); 064. "I'll Do It" (やってみるか, Yatte Miru ka); 065. "The Student Body President of Hakoniwa Academy is" (箱庭学園の生徒会長は, Hakoniwa Gakuen no Seito Kaichō wa); 066. "What of it?" (だったらどうだって言うのさ, Dattara Dōdatte Iu no sa); 067. "We Are The Student Council" (生徒会は私達だ, Seitokai wa Watashitachi da); 068. "I Accept" (受け入れることだよ, Ukeireru Koto da yo); 069. "I Became Stronger" (強くなったね, Tsuyoku Natta ne); 070. "I Like It" (好きだぜ, Suki daze)
9	My Older Sister Kurokami Kujira; Kurokami Kujira to Iu Ane wa (黒神くじらという姉は)	March 4, 2011	978-4-08-870194-3
071. "Come Again When It's Over" (終わった頃にまたおいで, Owatta Koro ni Mata Oide); 072. "Even If Everyone Forgets Me" (みんなが俺を忘れても, Minna ga Ore o Wasuretemo); 073. "From Now On, I Will..." (今から俺は, Ima Kara Ore wa); 074. "Please Win For Sure" (絶対に勝って, Zettai ni Katte); 075. "It's Not A Reason To Give Up Fighting" (戦わない理由にはならない, Tatakawanai Riyū ni wa Naranai); 076. "My Older Sister Kurokami Kujira" (黒神くじらという姉は, Kurokami Kujira to Iu Ane wa); 077. "There's No Way I Can Win Against This" (敵うはずがねえだろう, Kanau Hazu ga nē darō); 078. "I Want You To Show Me" (私は見せてほしいんだ, Watashi wa Misete Hoshīnda); 079. "Just The Right Handicap" (ちょうどいいハンデでしょ, Chōdo Ii Hande Desho)
10	Nice to Meet You; Hajimemashite (初めまして)	May 2, 2011	978-4-08-870224-7
080. "He'll Return" (帰ってきてくれるから, Kaettekite Kureru Kara); 081. "My Love Was Real" (僕の恋は本物だったんだ, Boku no Koi wa Honmono Dattanda); 082. "I'm Your Son" (あんたの息子だぜ, Anta no Musuko daze); 083. "He Loves His Comrades" (仲間思いな男なんですよ, Nakama Omoi na Otoko Nandesu yo); 084. "I Wonder If We Could Understand Each Other" (わかりあうことができたのかなあ, Wakariau Koto ga Dekita no Kanā); 085. "I've Been Looking Forward To It" (私はずっと楽しみにしていました, Watashi wa Zutto Tanoshimi ni Shiteimashita); 086. "It Was an Unexpected Accident After All" (不慮の事故ですから, Furyo no Jiko desu kara); 087. "Obvious Popularity" (当たり前の人望です, Atarimae no Jinbō desu); 088. "Nice to Meet You" (初めまして, Hajimemashite)
11	Now and Long Ago; Ima mo Mukashi mo Sonna Kimi ga (今も昔もそんな君が)	August 4, 2011	978-4-08-870274-2
089. "And There Is Only One Rule" (そしてルールはただ一つ, Soshite Rūru wa Tada Hitotsu); 090. "Now and Long Ago" (今も昔もそんな君が, Ima mo Mukashi mo Sonna Kimi ga); 091. "Even If There Are Mistakes" (違いがあるとすれば, Chigai ga Aru to Sureba); 092. "I Was Told We'd Be Equals Someday" (永遠に揃わないと言われていた, Eien ni Sorowanai to Iwareteita); 093. "We're Just Impartial Non-Humans" (平等なだけの人外だよ, Byōdō na Dake no Jingai da yo); 094. "The Making of Kurokami Medaka's Successor" (黒神めだかの後継者作り, Kurokami Medaka no Kōkeisha-zukuri); 095. "If You Were Alone..." (ひとりでもいるのなら, Hitori Demo Iru no Nara); 096. "Because It's My Job!" (僕の仕事だからね, Boku no Shigoto Dakara ne); 097. "Please Don't Laugh" (笑ってやてください, Waratteyate Kudasai)
12	The Level of Difficulty is B Daiichi Kanmon wa Nan'ido Bī (第一関門は難易度B)	October 4, 2011	978-4-08-870296-4
098. "The Level of Difficulty is B" (第一関門は難易度B, Daiichi Kanmon wa Nan'ido Bī); 099. "Please Tell Me Just One More Thing" (もうひとつだけ聞かせてください, Mō Hitotsu Dake Kikasete Kudasai); 100. "Create A Themed Quiz, Please" (クイズを出して頂戴, Kuizu o Dashite Chōdai); 101. "Good Luck Then" (それではグッドラック, Sore de wa Guddo Rakku); 102. "Do Not Desire Anything" (何も欲しくない, Nanimo Hoshikunai); 103. "If I Am Able To Do That There Will Be No Problems" (それができれば文句なく, Sore ga Dekireba Monku naku); 104. "A Skill Holder And an Unskilled" (能力所有者が無力に, Sukiru Horudā ga Nō Sukiru ni); 105. "I Just Like It" (僕はただ好きなだけさ, Boku wa Tada Suki na Dake sa); 106. "I Don't Have a Heart" (私には心がありません, Watashi ni wa Kokoro ga Arimasen)
13	Meda Trial; Meda Kanmon (めだ関門)	December 2, 2011	978-4-08-870319-0
107. "I Don't Know Any Other Way To Live" (生き方を知らんのだ, Ikikata o Shiran no da); 108. "There's Nothing More Magnificent Then That" (これ以上なく最高に, Kore Ijō naku Saikō ni); 109. "I Think You Should Be Thankful To Those People Too" (こういう人間でありたい, Kōiu Ningen de Aritai); 110. "You Can't See It But" (見えないかもしれませんけれど, Mienai Kamo Shiremasen Keredo); 111. "Playing Around Is The Right Idea" (ふざけられたらいいんだけどね, Fuzakeraretara Iindakedo ne); 112. "To Say That You're Special" (特別な存在だなんて, Tokubetsu na Sonzai da Nante); 113. "Meda Trial" (めだ関門, Meda Kanmon); 114. "We Might Beat Kurokami Medaka" (黒神めだかに勝てるかも, Kurokami Medaka ni Kateru Kamo); 115. "This Is Where You Say" (これがきみ達の言うところの, Kore ga Kimitachi no Iu Tokoro no)
14	Before the Fight with Zenkichi; Zenkichi-kun to Tatakau Mae ni (善吉くんと戦う前に)	March 2, 2012	978-4-08-870374-9
116. "I" (俺は, Ore wa); 117. "You Are..." (お前は, Omae wa); 118. "I'm Trying To Change" (変わろうとしているんだ, Kawarō to Shiteirunda); 119. "Tsurubami Kamome" (鶴喰鴎, Tsurubami Kamome); 120. "Not Even a Smile" (にこりともしない, Nikori to mo Shinai); 121. "A Person Killing Another" (人を一人殺しておいて, Hito o Hitori Koroshiteoite); 122. "I Heard About it, but..." (話には聞いていたが, Hanashi ni wa Kiiteita ga); 123. "Before the Fight with Zenkichi" (善吉くんと戦う前に, Zenkichi-kun to Tatakau Mae ni); 124. "But The Cost Was Great" (代償も大きかった, Daishō mo Ōkikatta)
15	What is a Win? Kachi to wa Nanda? (勝ちとはなんだ？)	April 4, 2012	978-4-08-870421-0
125. "What is a Win?" (勝ちとはなんだ？, Kachi to wa Nanda?); 126. "What's Important in Someone's Heart is" (人の心に大切なのは, Hito no Kokoro ni Taisetsu na no wa); 127. "That's Why, Next Year, Medaka-chan Will" (だからめだかちゃんには, Dakara Medaka-chan ni wa); 128. "Unlike Justice Which Must Prevail" (正義と違って必ずしも, Seigi to Chigatte Kanarazushi mo); 129. "For That Reason This Game Is Most Definitely..." (ゆえにこのゲーム間違いなく, Yue ni Kono Gēmu Machigai naku); 130. "I Want Them to Have Fun" (楽しんで欲しいじゃん, Tanoshinde Hoshī jan); 131. "You Can Set A Trap" (罠を張ればいい, Wana o Hareba Ii); Special Chapter: "Good Loser Kumagawa" (グッドルーザー球磨川, Guddo Rūzā Kumagawa)
16	Life Is Epic; Ikiru Koto wa Gekiteki da (生きることは劇的だ)	July 4, 2012	978-4-08-870467-8
132. "This is the Springtime of Youth" (これぞ青春, Korezo Seishun); 133. "You Are No One But Yourself" (他の誰でもない, Hoka no Dare Demonai); 134. "You Are The Main Character" (お前が主役だ, Omae ga Shuyaku da); 135. "Shout" (叫べ, Sakebe); 136. "That Song is Definitely" (あの曲はきっと, Ano Kyoku wa Kitto); 137. "We Will Use The Suggestion Box" (目安箱を使用する, Meyasubako o Shiyōsuru); 138. "If I Want to Change Medaka-chan" (もしもめだかちゃんを変えたいのなら, Moshimo Medaka-chan o Kaetai no Nara); 139. "I Thought That It Was Wrong For Me to Live" (生きてちゃ駄目だと思っていた, Ikitecha Dame da to Omotteita); 140. "Life Is Epic" (生きることは劇的だ, Ikiru Koto wa Gekiteki da)
17	Hakoniwa Academy's 100th Student Council Committee; Hakoniwa Gakuen dai hyaku Seitokai Shikkoubu (箱庭学園第百生徒会執行部)	September 4, 2012	978-4-08-870501-9
141. "Before I Can Be Happy" (幸せになる前に, Shiawase ni Naru Mae ni); 142. "My Opponents Lack Nothing" (相手にとって不足なし, Aite Nitotte Fusoku Nashi); 143. "No, It's Not For That Reason" (そんな理由じゃないんてすよ, Sonna Riyuu Jya Nain Desu yo); 144. "Hakoniwa Academy's 100th Student Council Committee" (箱庭学園第百生徒会執行部, Hakoniwa Gakuen dai hyaku Seitokai Shikkoubu); 145. "Will Still Be Alive Tomorrow" (明日も絶対生きてるから, Ashita mo Zettai iki Terukara); 146. "I Didn't Mean to Laugh" (笑うつもりはなかったんです, Warau Tsumorihanakattandesu); 147. "Feels Like Your Luck is at an All Time Low" (不幸のどん底ゆう感じ, Fukou Nodon soko yuu Kanji); 148. "I am Medaka-chan's Older Sister" (めだかちゃんのお姉ちゃんだ, Medaka-Chan no Onee-Chan Da); 149. "Why Did I Come Here?" (何しにここに来たんだろう, Nani Shinikokoni Kitan Darou)
18	After The End of This Battle; Kono Tatakai ga Owattara (この戦いが終わったら)	December 4, 2012	978-4-08-870536-1
150. "I Want To Be Like That" (あんな風になりたいなあ, Anna Kaze Ninaritainaa); 151. "We Don't Run Away" (僕達は逃げない, Bokutachi ha Nige nai); 152. "This Seems Like a Price Worth Paying, Doesn't It?" (これで割は合うであろ？, Korede Wari ha au Dearo?); 153. "After The End of This Battle" (この戦いが終わったら, Kono Tatakai ga Owattara); 154. "What is Important to Me Now" (今の私に大事なものは, Ima no Watashi ni Daiji Namonoha); 155. "For The Sake of Zenkichi" (善吉のために, Zenkichi no Tameni); 156. "I am Kurokami Medaka" (私は黒神めだか, Watashi wa Kurokami Medaka); 157. "My Loss Would Have Been Decided" (私の負けは決まっていたよ, Watashi no Make ha Kimatteitayo); 158. "I Have no Words to Say" (言葉もない, Kotoba Monai)
19	Welcome to Shiranui Village; Yōkoso Shiranui no Sato e (ようこそ不知火の里へ)	February 4, 2013	978-4-08-870620-7
159. "Shiranui Hansode is..." (不知火半袖って, Shiranui Hansode tte); 160. "Welcome to Shiranui Village" (ようこそ不知火の里へ, Youkoso Shiranui no Sato he); 161. "What We're Really Protecting is" (俺達が守っているのは, Oretachi ga Mamotte Irunoha); 162. "Everything About Hakoniwa Academy" (箱庭学園のすべてが, Hakoniwa Gakuen no Subetega); 163. "Fresh" (新しい, Atarashii); 164. "Born to Destroy the World" (世界を滅ぼすために生まれてきた, Sekai o Horobo Sutameni umare Tekita); 165. "The Thirteen Party" (十三組の十三人, Sātein Pāti); 166. "I'll Crush Him Before The Day is Over" (今日中に叩き潰す, Kyoujuu ni Tataki Tsubusu); 167. "I Won't Definitely Tell You" (絶対に教えない, Zettai ni Oshie nai)
20	Fukurō Tsurubami; Tsurubami Fukurō (鶴喰梟)	April 4, 2013	978-4-08-870650-4
168. "The First and Only Bias Action" (たった一度の不公平だ, Tatta Ichido no Fukouhei da); 169. "Hakoniwa Academy Hospital Ruins" (箱庭病院跡地, Hakoniwa Byouin Atochi); 170. "Tsurubami Fukurou" (鶴喰 梟, Tsurubami Fukurō); 171. "I Lied Too Much" (あたしは嘘をつき過ぎた, Atashiha uso Wotsuki Sugi ta); 172. "Sleep My Baby, Sleep ♪" (ろりろりよ♪, Rori Rori yo ♪); 173. "What is a "Song"?" (歌とはなんだ？, Uta to Hananda?); 174. "I Hate Lies" (嘘が嫌いなんだ, Uso ga kirai nanda); 175. "Real Eater" (正喰者, Rearu Ītā); 176. "You're Forgiven" (許す, Yurusu)
21	I Love Human Beings; Watashi wa Ningen ga Daisuki desu (私は人間が大好きです)	June 4, 2013	978-4-08-870685-6
177. "Up Until Now, That Person" (この人は今まで, Kono nin ha imamade); 178. "I Cannot Promise That" (約束はできない, Yakusoku Hadekinai); 179. "I Love People" (私は人間が大好きです, Watashi ha Ningen ga Daisuki desu); 180. "Kurokami Final" (黒神ファイナル, Kurokami Fainaru); 181. "You Lost" (私達は負けたんだよ, Watashi Tachi ha make Tandayo); 182. "My Words Will Reach" (言葉は届く, Kotoba ha Todoku); 183. "His Heart Was Full" (心と共にあるような, Kokoro to Tomoni Aruyouna); 184. "And Medaka-chan" (そしてめだかちゃんは, Soshite Medaka-chan ha); 185. "One Plus One is" (いちたすいちは, Ichi Tasu Ichi ha)
22	Kurokami Medaka Is Still Well; Kurokami Medaka Kenzai Nari (黒神めだか健在なり)	September 4, 2013	978-4-08-870804-1
186. "It's Good-Bye Here" (ここでさよならだな, Kokode Sayonara Dana); 187. "The 100 Flowers Run" (百輪走, Hyaku wa Sou); 188. "Was it a Good Memory?" (思い出になれたかい, Omoide Ninaretakai); 189. "Now that I Think About It, Ever Since the Beginning" (思えば初めて会ったときから, Omoe ba Hajimete atta Tokikara); 190. "Once, at Hakoniwa Academy" (かつて箱庭学園には, Katsute Hakoniwa Gakuen niha); 191. "Ten Years Have Passed" (あれから十年, Arekara Juunen); 192. "Kurokami Medaka Is Still Well" (黒神めだか健在なり, Kurokami Medaka Kenzai Nari); Special Chapter: "Good Loser Kumagawa Final Chapter" (グッドルーザー球磨川 完結編, Guddo Rūzā Kumagawa Kanketsu Hen)
