= Chin Up Kid =

Single by Forever the Sickest Kids

from the album J.A.C.K.
- Released: May 7, 2013
- Genre: Pop punk; power pop; pop rock
- Length: 3:34
- Label: Fearless
- Songwriters: Jonathan Cook; Austin Bello; Caleb Turman; Kyle Burns; Rico Garcia
- Producer: Mike Green

Forever the Sickest Kids singles chronology
"Shut the Front Door (Too Young for This)" (2011)	"Chin Up Kid" (2013)	"Nice to Meet You" (2013)

"Chin Up Kid" is a song recorded by American pop punk band Forever the Sickest Kids for their third studio album J.A.C.K. It was released as the album's first official single on May 7, 2013, and is also the band's first single under the label Fearless Records. It was written by Jonathan Cook, Austin Bello, Caleb Turman, Kyle Burns, and Rico Garcia. A lyric video of the song was posted on the label's YouTube channel the day before the song was officially released.

== Writing and inspiration ==
The band explained about the song, "It's a feeling that anyone who's been through heartbreak will recognize. 'Chin Up Kid' can be a very relatable song to most. We wrote this song about keeping your head up through heartbreak and trying times. Young love can come and go before you realize you even had it. We hope this song motivates the listener to find inner strength to keep moving on and pressing forward." Rico Garcia, the band's touring lead guitarist, contributed to writing the song with the band.

Vocalist Jonathan Cook stated that this was one of his favorite songs from the album.

An introduction to the song was featured as a hidden track on the pregap of J.A.C.K. The track is only available on physical copies of the album and can be heard if the disc is manually rewound past the beginning of "Chin Up Kid". The intro is one minute long, with the first fifteen seconds remaining silent until a brief orchestra is heard along with a choir singing the chorus of the song.

== Music video ==
The music video was announced by the band on August 13, two days prior to its release. The video premiered on fuse on August 15 and contains live footage of the band performing on Warped Tour 2013.

== Reception ==
"Chin Up Kid" received positive reception from fans and critics among its release. Luke O'Neil of MTV Buzzworthy stated, "If you're looking for pop-punk's "it gets better" summer anthem, then you've found it... Meet your new soundtrack to soldiering on."

Matthew Sievers of SF Media said, "'Chin-Up Kid' is pretty much what one can expect from these guys. It's catchy, upbeat and about getting over heartbreak... It works really well and gets you excited for what's to come on the album like any opener should." Chris Cave from Reviews From The Cave claimed "Chin Up Kid" was one of the songs from the album that stood out, saying it is "one of the more catchier songs on the album."

Chase Walbaum at Undertow Press said, "The track is classic FTSK and boasts one of the catchiest chorus' on the record.

== Track listing ==
Digital download
No.	Title	Length
1.	"Chin Up Kid"	3:34

== Personnel ==
Forever the Sickest Kids

- Jonathan Cook – vocals, songwriter
- Austin Bello – bass guitar, vocals, songwriter
- Caleb Turman – rhythm guitar, vocals, songwriter
- Kyle Burns – drums, percussion, songwriter

Additional personnel

- Rico Garcia – songwriter
- Mike Green – producer, mixer

== Release history ==
Release dates and formats for "Chin Up Kid"
Region	Date	Format	Label	Ref.
United States	May 7, 2013	Digital download; stream	Fearless Records	
