= Forever the Sickest Kids =

American pop punk band

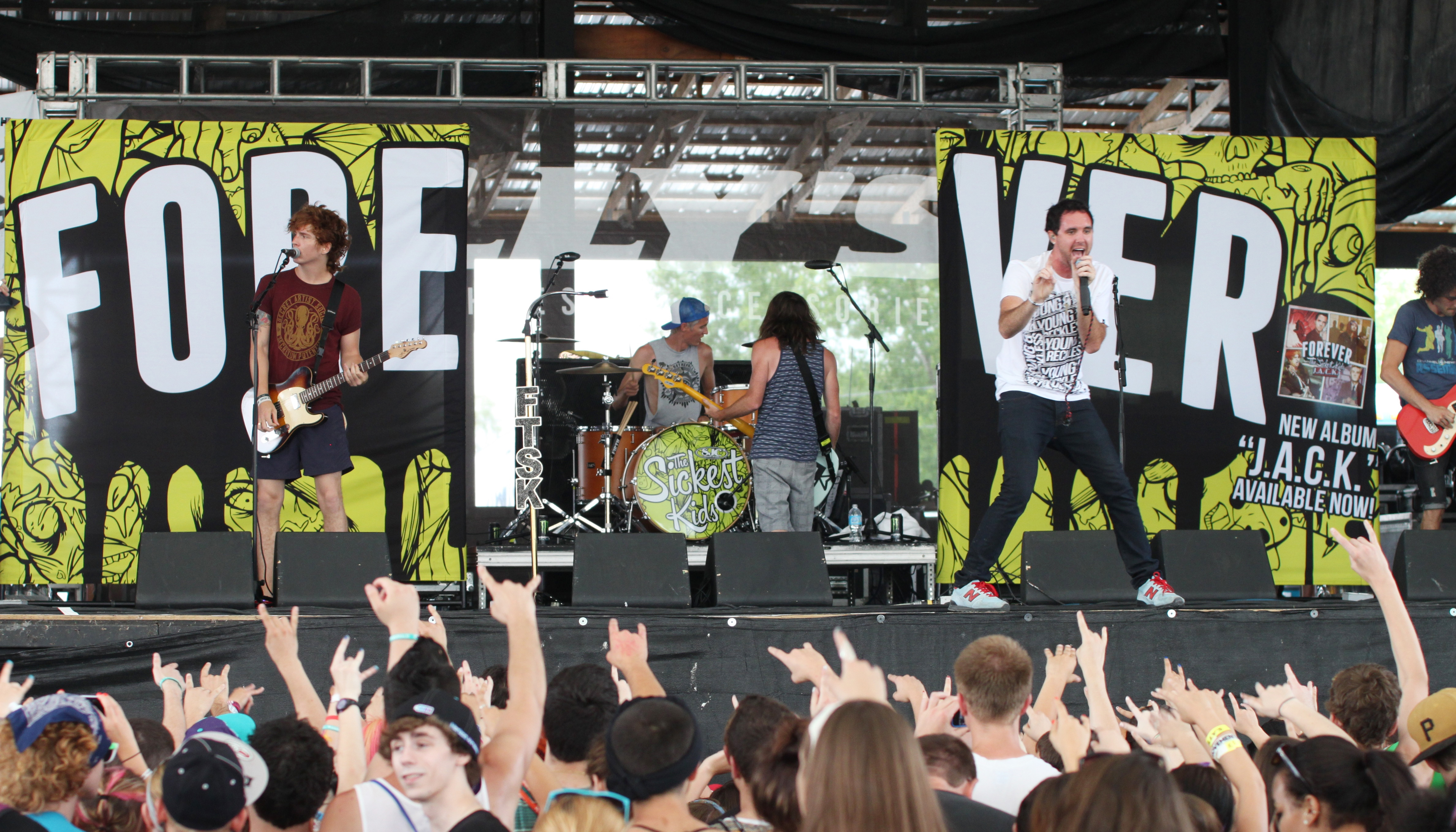
- Forever the Sickest Kids performing at Warped Tour in Darien, New York in 2013.

Background information
- Also known as: FTSK
- Origin: Dallas, Texas, United States
- Genres: Pop-punk; pop rock; neon pop-punk; power pop
- Years active: 2006–2013, 2017–present
- Labels: Universal Motown; Island; Fearless
- Members: Jonathan Cook; Austin Bello; Caleb Turman; Kyle Burns; Rico Andradi
- Past members: Marc Stewart; Kent Garrison
- Website: foreverthesickestkids.com

Forever the Sickest Kids (sometimes abbreviated as FTSK) is an American pop-punk band from Dallas, Texas. The band first signed with Universal Motown Records and released its debut album, Underdog Alma Mater, on April 29, 2008. The band's second album, Forever the Sickest Kids, was released on March 1, 2011. Universal Motown Records was later shut down in 2011 and the band was left unsigned for over a year until signing to Fearless Records in late 2012. The band released its third studio album, J.A.C.K., on June 24, 2013.

Following the release, the band went on hiatus and have made numerous reunions since then, including So What?! Music Festival in 2017 and 2023, Sad Summer Festival in 2019, and upcoming performances at the Sonic Temple Festival and Welcome to Rockville in 2027.

Their music has been used in the films The Flash, Diary of a Wimpy Kid and Bring It On: Fight to the Finish, as well as on the reality television series, The Hills. In an Alternative Press article, the band was placed number one of the "22 Best Underground Bands".

== History ==
=== 2001–2006: Early projects and formation ===
In 2001–2004, the members of Forever the Sickest Kids were brought together from separate paths. Drummer Kyle Burns and lead guitarist Marc Stewart are stepbrothers and shared many musical discoveries in their early lives. Stewart later met keyboardist Kent Garrison in high school. In Rockwall, Texas, guitarist Caleb Turman and bassist Austin Bello were in an acoustic pop band, Committed. The two had been playing in bands during their early teen years and started writing songs around the ages of 12-13. Garrison went to college, where he met singer Jonathan Cook. There, they formed the band called the Flipside with Burns and Stewart. Around the same time, Committed broke up, and Bello and Turman formed an acoustic/electronic project called Been Bradley.

When both bands, the Flipside and Been Bradley, ended in late 2006, Cook and Stewart came into contact with Bello and Turman, and it was suggested that the remaining members from both bands could form in a new band. Upon forming, Stewart recalled, "'Let's learn from our past mistakes in our other bands.' We were kind of convincing everyone to get in the band, and start everything, like 'we're gonna do this right, we're gonna put everything we have into it.' I think that was kind of like our attitude from day one."

Their new band, Forever the Sickest Kids, was formed. Cook remained on vocals, Turman took on rhythm guitar and vocals, Bello was on bass guitar and vocals, Stewart was on lead guitar, Burns was on drums, and Garrison switched to keyboard.

=== 2006–2009: Underdog Alma Mater ===
Days after the formation of Forever the Sickest Kids, Cook accidentally spent $350 that the band did not have on PureVolume to receive a front-page placement of a song. The band also did not have any songs written yet. The band wrote the song "Hey Brittany" and recorded it in two days. The band landed a record deal with Universal Motown Records in April 2007 and released their first EP, Television Off, Party On on July 3, 2007. The EP was recorded within four months of the group's formation. Two more EPs, The Sickest Warped Tour EP and Hot Party Jamz followed, months afterward. After these releases, the group toured across America and appeared on that year's Warped Tour.

On March 18, 2008, the group released the song, "Whoa Oh! (Me vs. Everyone)" on their MySpace page. The song was released as the lead single on April 1, 2008, from their debut studio album. The music video for the song premiered on April 10, and was directed by Shane Drake. It reached number 38 on the US Pop Airplay chart. The song also peaked at number one on the Japan Hot 100 Airplay chart. Their debut studio album, Underdog Alma Mater was released on April 29. The album peaked at number 45 on the US Billboard 200. The album's second single, "She's a Lady", was released on July 11, 2008. The music video for "She's a Lady" was released on September 13, 2008. The band covered the song, "Men in Black" by Will Smith for the compilation album Punk Goes Crunk. In September 2008, the band signed a record deal for the United Kingdom with Island Records.

In support of the album, the band went on the 2008 Alternative Press tour along with All Time Low, The Rocket Summer, The Matches and Sonny. They went on a US tour alongside Metro Station, the Maine, the Cab and Danger Radio in May 2008. The band also performed on the 2008 Vans Warped Tour. The band appeared on Late Night with Conan O'Brien on June 12, performing "Whoa Oh! (Me vs. Everyone)". The band performed in Tokyo, Japan at the annual Summer Sonic Festival in 2008. In October and November, the band supported Cobra Starship on their Sassy Back (Tour) in the US.

In February 2009, the band toured across Europe, Australia and Japan with support from Artist vs. Poet. In April, the band performed on the Bamboozle Roadshow and appeared at The Bamboozle festival in early May. A duet version of "Whoa Oh! (Me vs. Everyone)" featuring Selena Gomez was released on May 26, 2009. The deluxe edition of Underdog Alma Mater was released on July 7, 2009, and features the original twelve songs from the album, seventeen additional tracks that were mainly demos and acoustics from the band's earlier days, and a DVD that included recorded live shows of the band and music videos. The band performed at the 2009 Vans Warped Tour in late June and late August.

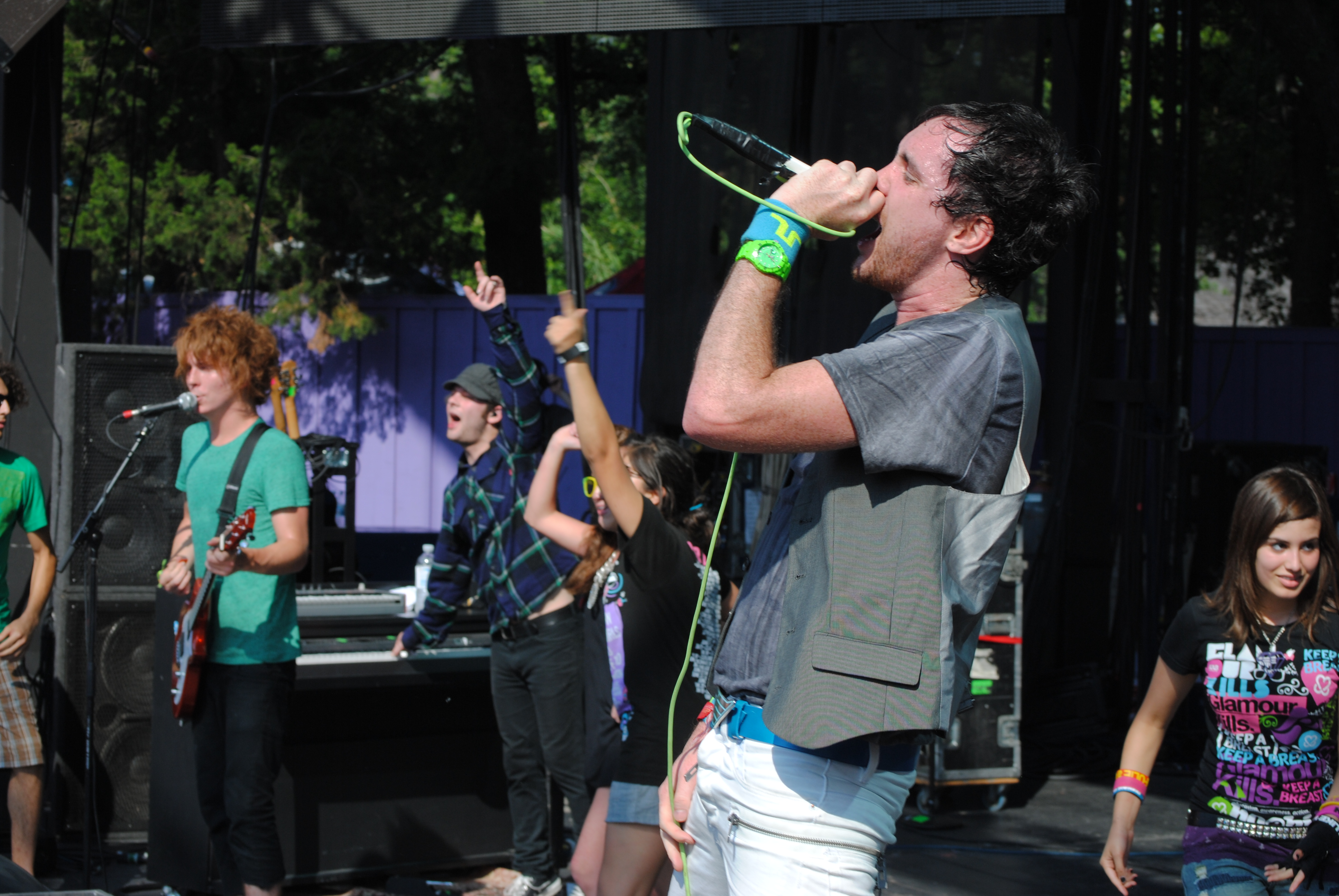
Forever the Sickest Kids performing at the Bamboozle Roadshow in 2010.

=== 2009–2011: The Weekend: Friday and self-titled album ===
On October 30, 2009, the band released a new single, "What Do You Want from Me". The song serves as the lead single from their fourth EP The Weekend: Friday, which was released on November 17, 2009. On November 12, the EP was made available for streaming on the band's MySpace profile. The EP was originally intended to be a mini-LP, and was to be the first part of The Weekend series, with Saturday and Sunday slated for 2010. The EP debuted at number 107 on the US Billboard 200. A music video for "What Do You Want from Me" premiered on December 14, 2009, via MTV.

On January 25, 2010, the band was featured on an episode of the MTV series Silent Library. In February, the compilation album Punk Goes Classic Rock was released, with the band covering "Crazy Train" by Ozzy Osbourne. In March, a version of "What Do You Want from Me" with slight editing of the lyrics was used in the ending credits of the film Diary of a Wimpy Kid. The band supported British band You Me at Six on their UK tour in March 2010.

The group released the EP's second single "She Likes (Bittersweet Love)" on January 14, 2010. The band released two teaser videos for the song on their YouTube channel in April 2010. The official music video was released on April 19. The song reached number one on Kerrang's Top 10 chart. The band then supported The Downtown Fiction, All Time Low, Boys Like Girls, Third Eye Blind, and LMFAO on The Bamboozle Roadshow 2010. Around this time, the band had finished writing material for The Weekend: Saturday and started demoing songs for The Weekend: Sunday.

On September 14, 2010, the band released a new single titled "Keep On Bringing Me Down". It was announced that this would be the lead single from The Weekend: Saturday, which was planned to be the continuation from the group's previous EP, The Weekend: Friday. The band went on "The Summer Camp for the Dope Awesome Kids Tour", which featured The Scene Aesthetic, The Ready Set, A Cursive Memory and Phone Calls from Home.

Garrison in 2010.

The group began working on their second studio album with producers David Bendeth and John Bender in 2010 in New Jersey, New York, Irving and Fort Worth. The band ultimately merged The Weekend: Saturday into their second album. They explained this decision was made because as they had gone into the studio with producer Bendeth, they continued to quickly write more than five songs for the EP and decided to release a full-length album instead. While touring, the band began to play a new track from the new album, called "Life of the Party".

On January 10, 2011, two months before the release of the self-titled album, Garrison posted on his blog that he was leaving the band, stating that he wanted to "pursue other opportunities." The group released their self-titled album, Forever the Sickest Kids for streaming on their MySpace page on February 27, 2011. The album was officially released on March 1. The album peaked at number 33 on the US Billboard 200.

Stewart in 2011.

The band headlined the "Spring Break Your Heart" tour with Breathe Carolina, We Are the In Crowd, This Century, Tonight Alive and Before Their Eyes from March to April 2011. They released "I Guess You Can Say Things Are Getting Pretty Serious" as the album's second single for radio airplay on April 5, 2011. "Summer Song" was released as the third single on June 26, 2011, from the album.

On September 22, Stewart announced that he had left the band. Rico Andradi served as a touring member for the band and became Stewart's replacement. The band later commented on both Garrison's and Stewart's departures, stating that both had left on great terms and wanted to go back to college, due to never finishing because of the formation of the band.

Due to the separation of Motown Records from Universal Motown Records and Universal Motown Republic Group and because of the cancellations with Universal Motown, the band was left unsigned. The band released a non-album single, "Shut the Front Door (Too Young for This)", October 28, 2011. On December 5, 2011, the group released a Christmas single titled, "Mistletoe is for Quitters".

=== 2012–2013: J.A.C.K. and hiatus ===
In February 2012, the group performed at the LIV5 event along with the Ready Set, the Summer Set, and A Rocket to the Moon in Manila, Philippines. The band performed at the Soundwave Festival in Australia from February to March 2012.

In May 2012, the group confirmed that they began writing their third studio album. On September 10, 2012, the band signed to Fearless Records. They contributed to the compilation album Punk Goes Pop 5, covering "We Found Love" by Rihanna. For the first time in the group's music, a short breakdown was included, which consisted of Bello screaming during his verse. Burns stated, "It's a time for us to get crazy without being worried about stepping out of our comfort zones, because they aren't our songs... So we thought it would be fun to mix it up a bit." The group performed the theme song "We Are the Guardians", for the Nicktoons show NFL Rush Zone: Guardians of the Core.

On January 29, 2013, the band revealed that they were working with producer Mike Green on their third studio album. The band performed at the NFL Play 60 Kids' Day Experience in New Orleans at the Ernest N. Morial Convention Center, ahead of the Super Bowl XLVII. On February 21, in an interview with idobi Radio, Cook revealed that the album would consist of twelve songs and would be released on June 25. Cook stated that the group wrote forty-six songs during the production of the album. On April 25, a preview of "Chin Up Kid" was released and the album's cover art and track listing were revealed, with its title confirmed as J.A.C.K. "Chin Up Kid" was officially released for digital download on May 7, 2013. On May 24, Billboard streamed the song "Nice to Meet You", with its official release date on May 28. Pre-order bundles for the album were also released on May 28, which included limited copies of the album on 12" vinyl. On June 21, the band streamed J.A.C.K. on its Facebook page. One day before the album's release, the band posted lyric videos for each song from the album. The album peaked at number 94 on the US Billboard 200. The band performed on Warped Tour 2013, which started on June 15 and ended on August 4. A live music video for "Chin Up Kid" premiered on August 15, 2013. On September 24, 2013, the group released the album's third single "Nikki". The song was co-written by Patrick Stump of Fall Out Boy.

In March 17, 2014, Turman said in an interview that he was unsure of the band's status and was moving on to focus on his own music. However, on the same day, the band announced that it was not breaking up and that no one was leaving the band. Turman and Andradi formed a band called TEAM*, along with Jay Vilardi of the Almost, and Bryan Donahue, formerly of Boys Like Girls. The following day, Bello and Burns released their own song "Cool", featuring Dusty Goode.

On August 20, 2015, the band posted on their Facebook page that they were "very much alive and well" and they had been taking the time to focus on their personal lives.

=== 2017–present: Return ===
In November 2016, the band confirmed that they would be performing again. The band returned to the stage and performed at the So What?! Music Festival in Grand Prairie, Texas from March 24 to 26, 2017. Their performance marked the first time they had played together since late 2013.

In an interview, Cook revealed the band has no plans to release new music or to hold any performances in the near future. However, he said if the timing is right the band will perform again, "even if it's just for one, fun show." As stated in the article, "The band isn't defunct, but dormant. The band [is] on pause until opportunity and availability align again." Cook concluded, "Keep following us on Facebook. That's where the updates will be."

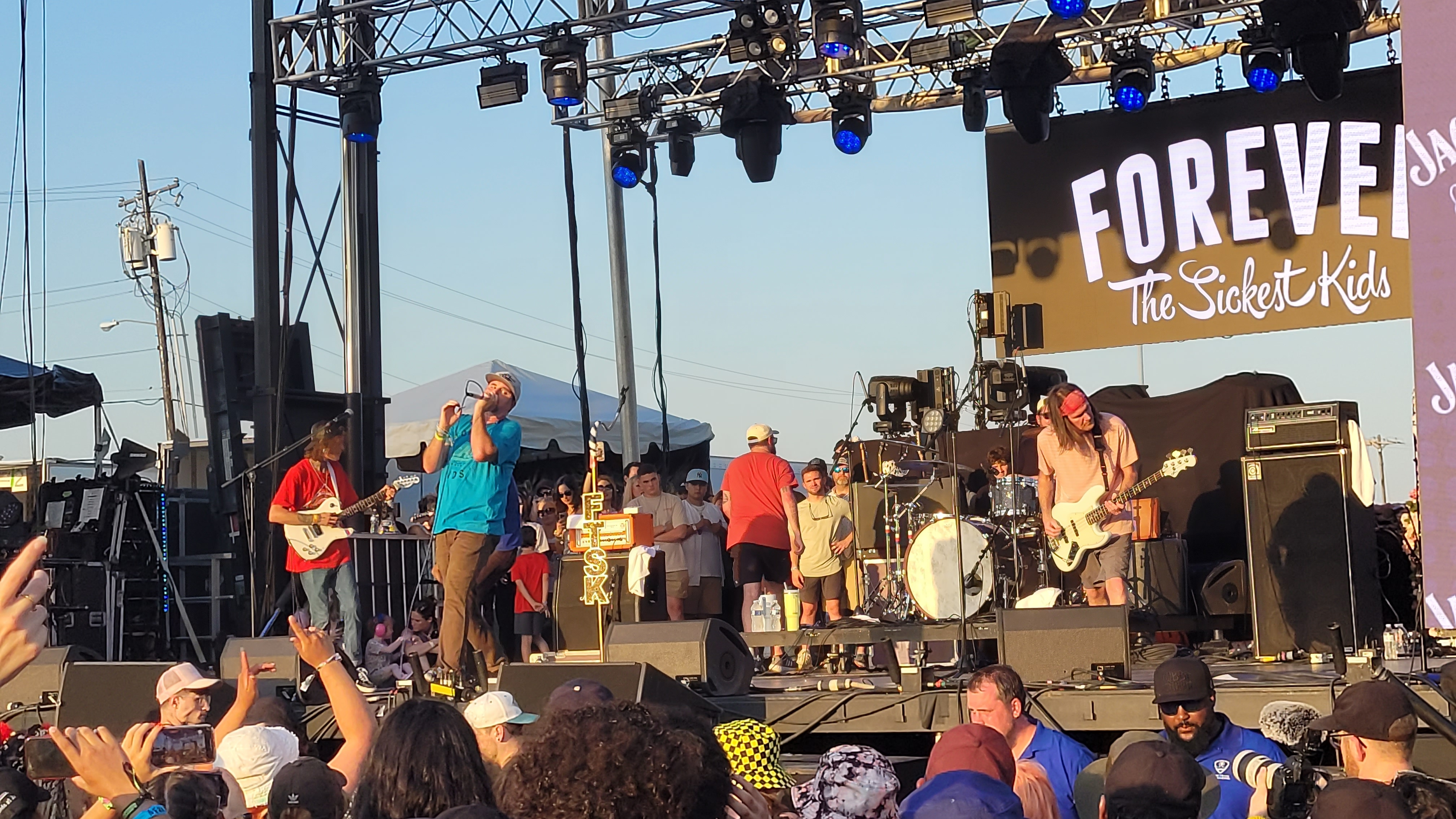
Forever the Sickest Kids performing at the So What Music Festival in 2023.

On April 29, 2018, the band celebrated the 10 year anniversary of Underdog Alma Mater by releasing limited vinyl editions of the album. The group performed in July 2019 in Texas as part of the Sad Summer Festival. On June 24, 2023, the band performed at the So What?! Music Festival in Dallas. They also performed a set at The Trees in Dallas on June 23, 2023, as a "pre-SoWhat" show. It was announced in October 2026, that the band will reunite, performing at the Sonic Temple Festival and Welcome to Rockville, scheduled for May 2027.

Outside of Forever the Sickest Kids, Cook works as a Texas realtor, Bello composes music for companies, TV shows and films such as Macy's, and Turman occasionally performs as an independent artist.

== Musical style and influences ==
Forever the Sickest Kids' main genres consist of pop punk, neon pop punk, pop rock, emo pop and power pop. Many of the band's songs feature synthesizers and have dance and electronic based influences, along with the piano and keyboard often being included. Acoustic and hip hop have also been utilized in the group's music. The band mainly has positive, upbeat sounds in its songs, which are typically structured with pop based hooks, both electronic and regular drum beats, and catchy guitar riffs that still maintain rock and punk elements to the music. A primary example that displays the band's structure, sound, and vocal arrangement is the song "I Don't Know About You, But I Came to Dance", found on the band's first release, Television Off, Party On.

Before his departure, Stewart stated, "Ultimately, when you hear the music, we want it to make you want to dance in your car while you're driving. We want it to be easy to sing along to but so catchy you don't wanna stop."

In nearly every song by the band, Cook, Bello, and Turman share lead vocals. Cook usually sings the chorus of the song, while Bello and Turman take on the verses, although it is not limited to this routine. Cook generally sings with a powerful, screeching voice and frequently ranges from a low to high pitch. Bello's vocals are similar to Cook's; however, Bello usually sings with a higher pitch and has a more distinct voice. Turman is known for taking the lead in the band's acoustic songs, such as "Coffee Break" and "Forever Girl", due to having a much softer voice than Cook and Bello. He also sang prominently in "What Happened to Emotion? (Killing Me)", with Cook and Bello only singing the bridge of the song.

Blink-182, Fall Out Boy, Weezer, Bowling for Soup, New Found Glory, and Fountains of Wayne have served as some of the main influences for the band.

== Band members ==
Current

- Jonathan Cook – co-lead vocals (2006–present), piano, keyboards, synthesizer (2011–present)
- Austin Bello – bass, co-lead vocals (2006–present)
- Caleb Turman – lead guitar (2011–present), rhythm guitar, co-lead vocals (2006–present)
- Kyle Burns – drums, percussion (2006–present)

Touring

- Rico Andradi – rhythm guitar, lead guitar (2011–present)

Former

- Marc Stewart – lead guitar (2006–2011)
- Kent Garrison – keyboards, synthesizers, piano (2006–2011)

Timeline

== Discography ==
Studio albums

- Underdog Alma Mater (2008)
- Forever the Sickest Kids (2011)
- J.A.C.K. (2013)
