= She Likes (Bittersweet Love) =

Single by Forever the Sickest Kids

from the album The Weekend: Friday
- Released: January 14, 2010
- Studio: Red Bull Studios, Santa Monica, California; The Lair Studio, Los Angeles, California
- Genre: Pop punk
- Length: 2:49
- Label: Universal Motown
- Songwriters: Austin Bello; Caleb Turman; Jonathan Cook; Michael Shimshack
- Producer: Matt Squire

Forever the Sickest Kids singles chronology
"What Do You Want from Me" (2009)	"She Likes (Bittersweet Love)" (2010)	"Keep On Bringing Me Down" (2010)

Music video
- "She Likes (Bittersweet Love)" on YouTube

"She Likes (Bittersweet Love)" is a song by American pop punk band Forever the Sickest Kids. The song was released on January 14, 2010, as the second and final single from the group's fourth EP The Weekend: Friday. The song reached number one on Kerrang's Top 10 chart.

== Composition ==
"She Likes (Bittersweet Love)" was written by Austin Bello, Caleb Turman, Jonathan Cook and Michael Shimshack while production was handled by Matt Squire. Guitarist Marc Stewart spoke about the song's meaning with Alternative Press. He stated, "This is about a girl who can't make up her mind. She likes one thing, but then she likes the opposite. We have all dated that type of girl, so it was easy to write about." The track was recorded at Red Bull Studios in Santa Monica, California and The Lair Studio in Los Angeles, while mixing was handled at Southbeach Studios in Miami by Tom Lord-Alge.

== Music video ==
The music video for "She Likes (Bittersweet Love)" premiered on April 19, 2010 and was directed by Danny Drysdale. The video features cameo appearances from television sportscaster Pat Summerall and drummer Kyle Burn's girlfriend Mindy White. Prior to its release, the band had posted multiple teaser videos on their YouTube account in preparation for the release of the full music video for the song.

The video sees the group competing in the PPPGA tour (a parody of the PGA Tour) in the hopes of winning the "Forever The Sickest Cup." At the end of the video, a couple members were disqualified and others were declared winners. The music video reached number 167 on the US iTunes music video chart.

== Personnel ==
Credits adapted from CD liner notes.

Forever the Sickest Kids

- Jonathan Cook – vocals
- Austin Bello – bass guitar, vocals
- Caleb Turman – rhythm guitar, vocals
- Marc Stewart – lead guitar
- Kent Garrison – keyboards, synthesizers
- Kyle Burns – drums, percussion

Production

- Matt Squire – producer
- Tom Lord-Alge – mixing
- Travis Huff – engineering
- Ric Stenman – engineering
- Michael Shimshack – composer

== Charts ==
Chart performance for "She Likes (Bittersweet Love)"
Chart (2010)	Peak position
UK Kerrang Top 10	1

== Release history ==
Release history for "She Likes (Bittersweet Love)"
Region	Date	Format	Label	Ref.
United States	January 14, 2010	Contemporary hit radio	Universal Motown	
United Kingdom	March 29, 2010	CD	Island	
United Kingdom	April 26, 2010	Contemporary hit radio	Island	
