= Yeah (Park Jung-ah album) =

Studio album by Park Jung-ah
- Released: August 25, 2006
- Genre: K-pop
- Length: 41:18
- Label: CJ Music

Yeah is the debut studio album, by South Korean singer Park Jung-ah it was released on August 25, 2006. It was the 95th-highest-selling Korean pop album in 2006.

== Track listing ==
1. My Time
2. 결국...사랑 (Eventually... Love) (featuring Jeon Jae-Deok)
3. Yeah...
4. 눈물을 멈추고 (Stop The Tears)
5. Fly Away
6. D-Day (하루만 더) (D-Day (Just One More Day))
7. Don't Let Me Go
8. Beautiful today
9. 이러지 마세요 (Don't Be This Way)
10. 약해질까봐 (Because I Might Get Weak)
11. You're my friend
