= The Weekend: Friday =

EP by Forever the Sickest Kids
- Released: November 17, 2009
- Recorded: 2008–2009
- Studio: Red Bull Studios, Santa Monica, California; The Lair Studio, Los Angeles, California; SKYlab, Fort Worth, Texas; Maximum Volume, New York City
- Genre: Pop punk; power pop; pop rock; neon pop punk
- Length: 20:52
- Label: Universal Republic
- Producer: Jonathan Cook; Kyle Burns; Matt Squire; Geoff Rockwell; Shep Goodman; Kyle Kelso

Forever the Sickest Kids chronology
Underdog Alma Mater (2008)	The Weekend: Friday (2009)	Forever the Sickest Kids (2011)

Singles from The Weekend: Friday
- 1. "What Do You Want from Me" Released: October 30, 2009; 2. "She Likes (Bittersweet Love)" Released: January 14, 2010

The Weekend: Friday is an EP by American pop punk band Forever the Sickest Kids. It was released on November 17, 2009, through Universal Republic. The EP peaked at number 107 on the Billboard 200. It was supported by two singles for its release: "What Do You Want from Me" and "She Likes (Bittersweet Love)".

== Background ==
The EP was originally intended to be a mini-LP, and was to be the first part of The Weekend series, with Saturday and Sunday following. Lead guitarist Marc Stewart explained that the idea was to "have a lot of music come out really quick [...] we'll be able to send out a CD with seven songs every six to nine months, or through the course of a year." However, as a large number of songs were written, the band decided to release a full-length self-titled album instead. On September 21, 2009, the group announced the release date of the EP. On November 13, the band streamed the entire EP on their Myspace page.

The first single from the EP, "What Do You Want from Me", was originally released on October 30, 2009. A music video was later released on YouTube in late December. On March 19, 2010, the single was re-released for the film Diary of a Wimpy Kid, entitled "What Do You Want from Me (Diary of a Wimpy Kid Mix)".

The second single from the EP, "She Likes (Bittersweet Love)" was released on January 14, 2010. In April 2010, the band had posted multiple teaser videos on their YouTube account in preparation for the release of the full music video for the song. The music video for the song premiered on April 19.

The band supported British band You Me at Six on their UK tour in March 2010. In May and June, the band went on the Bamboozle Road Show 2010 tour.

== Composition ==
Most of the songs on the EP were written about relationships, such as "Tough Love", "She Likes (Bittersweet Love)" and "Take It Slow", as told by Stewart to Alternative Press. The last track "What Do You Want from Me" is about thinking for yourself instead of listening to others, which Stewart said was written "during a time in our lives when everyone was trying to push us in different ways."

== Critical reception ==
Professional ratings
Review scores
Source	Rating
AbsolutePunk.net	(56%)
AllMusic	3/5 stars
Review, Rinse, Repeat	2/5 stars
Strange Glue	5/10 stars
The Skinny	1/5 stars

The Weekend: Friday was met with mixed reviews from music critics. Tim Sendra of AllMusic remarked, "The enthusiasm of the band and Cook, the hermetically sealed production techniques, and the overall catchiness of the tunes give the band and the EP a boost that helps them stay afloat in the still rising tide of emo-pop bands in the late 2000s." However, he was critical on the track "Hawkbot", as he called it a, "wrongheaded idea." Blake Solomon of AbsolutePunk.net gave a mixed review labelling songs like "Hawkbot" and "Hip Hop Chick", "pieces of absolute garbage." However, he did state, "A lot of attention has been correctly given to the choruses, and for the most part they end up stuck in your head." A negative review came from Ryan Drever of The Skinny criticizing the "auto-tune riddled vocals" and "sparkly synths." However, he praised the EP's production and harmonies.

== Track listing ==
All vocals by Jonathan Cook, Austin Bello, and Caleb Turman, except where noted.

No.	Title	Writer(s)	Producer(s)	Length
1.	"Do or Die"	Cook; Bello; Turman; Sam Hollander; Dave Katz	Matt Squire	3:17
2.	"Tough Love"	Bello; Turman	Squire	2:58
3.	"She Likes (Bittersweet Love)"	Cook; Bello; Turman; Michael Shimshack	Squire	2:49
4.	"Take It Slow"	Bello; Kent Garrison	Squire	2:45
5.	"Hip Hop Chick" (Cook)	Cook; Bello; Turman; Brian Kierulf; Josh Schwartz	Shep Goodman; Geoff Rockwell; Kyle Kelso	2:47
6.	"What Do You Want from Me" (Bello/Cook)	Bello; Turman; Goodman	Squire	2:37

Bonus track
No.	Title	Writer(s)	Producer(s)	Length
7.	"Hawkbot" (Bello/Cook, featuring Chae Hawk)	Cook; Bello; Kyle Burns; Turman; Marc Stewart; Garrison; Chae Hawk	Cook; Burns	3:38
Total length:				20:52

Notes

- "Do or Die" is a rewrite of the song "Stop Giving Your Love" by Been Bradley, the acoustic/electronic project Bello and Turman created before the formation of Forever the Sickest Kids.
- Chae Hawk, who was featured in "Hawkbot", was previously featured in a remix of the band's song "Believe Me, I'm Lying", which was included as a track on the band's deluxe edition of their previous release, Underdog Alma Mater.

== Personnel ==
Credits for The Weekend: Friday adapted from AllMusic.

Forever the Sickest Kids

- Jonathan Cook – vocals, drums, producer
- Austin Bello – bass guitar, vocals
- Caleb Turman – rhythm guitar, vocals
- Marc Stewart – lead guitar
- Kent Garrison – keyboards, synthesizers
- Kyle Burns – drums, percussion, mixing

Additional musicians

- Chae Hawk – guest vocals on "Hawkbot"

Production and artwork

- Matt Squire – producer
- Tom Coyne – mastering
- Tom Lord-Alge – mixing
- Shep Goodman – A&R
- Kevin Ou – photography
- Travis Huff – engineering
- Eric Stenman – engineering

== Charts ==
Chart performance for The Weekend: Friday
Chart (2009)	Peak position
US Billboard 200 (Billboard)	107
US Top Alternative Albums (Billboard)	23
US Top Rock Albums (Billboard)	33

== Release history ==
Release formats for The Weekend: Friday
Region	Date	Format(s)	Label	Ref.
Various	November 17, 2009	CD; digital download	Universal Motown	
United Kingdom	March 29, 2010	CD	Universal Motown	
