= She's a Lady (Forever the Sickest Kids song) =

Single by Forever the Sickest Kids

from the album Underdog Alma Mater
- Released: July 11, 2008
- Recorded: 2007
- Genre: Pop punk; power pop
- Length: 4:00 (Album Version); 3:42 (UK Radio Edit)
- Label: Universal Motown
- Songwriters: Austin Bello; Caleb Turman; Jonathan Cook; Marc Stewart
- Producers: Geoff Rockwell; Matt Squire

Forever the Sickest Kids singles chronology
"Whoa Oh! (Me vs. Everyone)" (2008)	"She's a Lady" (2008)	"What Do You Want from Me" (2010)

Alternative cover
- Front of picture disc

Music video
- "She's a Lady" on YouTube

"She's a Lady" is the second single from Underdog Alma Mater by American pop punk band Forever the Sickest Kids. It was released on July 11, 2008, in the United States. The song also serves as the group's debut single released in the UK on July 14, 2008, during the band's tour in the country.

== Composition and recording ==
"She's a Lady" was written by band members Austin Bello, Caleb Turman, Jonathan Cook and Marc Stewart, while production was handled by Geoff Rockwell and Matt Squire. Lyrically, the song speaks about a relationship gone bad. The song was originally recorded for their debut 2007 EP, Television Off, Party On. It was later re-record for their debut studio album, Underdog Alma Mater.

== Release ==
The song was chosen to be the next US single after beating out songs "Hey Brittany" and "Believe Me, I'm Lying" in a poll conducted on the band's website. It was released for digital download on July 11, 2008. A limited edition 7" picture disc was also made and sold temporarily in the UK on July 14, 2008.

== Critical reception ==
Katherine Fulton of AllMusic stated that the track "sounds like it could be an outtake from any number of groups (albeit one with a whining chorus and bland verses)." However, Joe DeAndrea of AbsolutePunk.net was more positive about the song remarking, "they manage to pack it with a harder punch that makes them irresistible."

== Music video ==
A music video was for the song premiered on September 13, 2008 and was directed by Phil Ruland, Ryan Ruland and the band's drummer, Kyle Burns. The music video is intercut of scenes of the band at a party, performing the song, and showing a girl who meets with her boyfriend.

An older, previous music video of when the band first started out also exists. This version of the video goes through the same basic concept as its successor. Another video was made that consists of live performances of the band performing the song in the United Kingdom.

== Track listing ==
Digital download
No.	Title	Length
1.	"She's a Lady"	4:00
2.	"Give and Take" (remix)	2:21

US CD single
No.	Title	Length
1.	"She's a Lady" (radio edit)	3:17
2.	"She's a Lady" (album version)	4:00

UK CD single
No.	Title	Length
1.	"She's a Lady" (radio edit)	3:42

== Personnel ==
Credits for "She's a Lady" adapted from album's liner notes.

Forever the Sickest Kids

- Jonathan Cook – lead vocals
- Austin Bello – bass, vocals
- Caleb Turman – rhythm guitar, vocals
- Kyle Burns – drums
- Marc Stewart – lead guitar
- Kent Garrison – keyboards, synthesizers

Production

- Matt Squire – producer
- Geoff Rockwell – producer
- Eric Stenman – engineer
- Tom Lord-Alge – mixing
- Femio Hernandez – assistant mixing

== Release history ==
Release dates and formats for "She's a Lady"
Region	Date	Format	Label	Ref.
Various	July 11, 2008	Digital download	Universal Motown	
United Kingdom	July 14, 2008	7" Vinyl	Universal Motown	
United States	December 2, 2008	Contemporary hit radio	Universal Motown	
