= Nice to Meet You (Forever the Sickest Kids song) =

Single by Forever the Sickest Kids

from the album J.A.C.K.
- Released: May 28, 2013
- Genre: Pop punk; power pop; pop rock
- Length: 3:32
- Label: Fearless
- Songwriters: Jonathan Cook; Austin Bello; Caleb Turman; Kyle Burns; Marc Stewart; Rico Garcia
- Producer: Mike Green

Forever the Sickest Kids singles chronology
"Chin Up Kid" (2013)	"Nice to Meet You" (2013)	"Nikki" (2013)

Music video
- "Nice to Meet You" on YouTube

"Nice to Meet You" is a song recorded by American pop punk band Forever the Sickest Kids for their third studio album J.A.C.K. It was released as the album's second single on May 28, 2013. It was written by Jonathan Cook, Austin Bello, Caleb Turman, Kyle Burns, Marc Stewart, and Rico Garcia. The song was originally posted as a lyric video on Billboard on May 24 and then later on YouTube by Fearless Records on May 27.

== Writing and inspiration ==
Vocalist Jonathan Cook explained about the song, "'Nice to Meet You' was a song we wrote about honest feelings about how the media is so filled with negativity nowadays. We live in the greatest country in the world and these lyrics are about how our country's stereotypes are perceived by outsiders looking in." The band's former lead guitarist Marc Stewart co-wrote the song, alongside Rico Garcia, who replaced Stewart as a touring member for the band.

The song also revamps the song "America" by Been Bradley, the acoustic/electronic project that band members Austin Bello and Caleb Turman had created before the formation of Forever the Sickest Kids. The lyric in the hook, "America, nice to meet you", is the same and the background vocals ("Ooh, ooh, ooh, ooh") imitate the instrumentation from "America".

In an interview with Turman, he said of the idea, "It was our chance to rebirth an idea that we really wanted to release. We were like 'Oh, we have this song that we were working on and I'm not entirely sure if it is going to work. But if it does work, it could be amazing.' We told the guys that and played that section of the song. That's how it happened. Everyone seemed to love it and we kind of moved on past it."

== Music video ==
Two clips previewing the music video for the song were uploaded on YouTube by Fearless Records on July 1. The official release of the video was not revealed until December 13, when the band announced it would be released three days later. The video premiered on December 16 on Vevo. The band shot the video with G&L.

The music video features the band performing the song in front of a large wall with graffiti on it, mainly displaying political illustrations and the lyrics of the song. The band's touring member, Rico Garcia, is seen performing with the band. The video also follows a group of men who spray paint graffiti of the illustrations and lyrics in the streets, as well.

== Reception ==
"Nice to Meet You" received a positive response among fans and critics, with one reviewer stating, "These guys continue to produce top quality music – instrumentally and lyrically. 'Nice To Meet You' is basically outlining everything that is wrong with society – from what we hear to what we do. Do yourself a favor and listen to 'Nice To Meet You'..." Catherine Yi of idobi Radio said the song has "a stronger structure and unique lyrics."

Matthew Sievers of SF Media said, "...this [song's] lyrical content is the best I've seen these guys achieve and that is a real testament. It's a laid back track and it'll make you smile, if it doesn't than you’re most likely not a fan of this music anyway." Chris Cave from Reviews From The Cave said "Nice to Meet You" has "strong memorable lyrics and [is] a really catchy song." Hit the Floor Magazine called it "one of the strongest on the album."

A less positive review said, "...it seems as though FTSK set the bar so high on their debut full length Underdog Alma Mater, no matter what they put out they can't seem to top it. While 'Nice To Meet You' isn't terrible by any means, it's incomparable to the band's earlier material."

== Track listing ==
Digital download
No.	Title	Length
1.	"Nice to Meet You"	3:32

== Personnel ==
Forever the Sickest Kids

- Jonathan Cook – vocals, songwriter
- Austin Bello – bass guitar, vocals, songwriter
- Caleb Turman – rhythm guitar, vocals, songwriter
- Kyle Burns – drums, percussion, songwriter

Additional personnel

- Rico Garcia – songwriter
- Marc Stewart – songwriter
- Mike Green – producer, mixer

== Release history ==
Release dates and formats for "Nice to Meet You"
Region	Date	Format	Label	Ref.
United States	May 28, 2013	Digital download; stream	Fearless Records	
