= Television Off, Party On =

EP by Forever the Sickest Kids
- Released: July 3, 2007
- Genre: Pop punk; power pop; pop rock; electronic
- Length: 18:00
- Label: Universal Motown Records
- Producer: Geoff Rockwell

Forever the Sickest Kids chronology
Television Off, Party On (2007)	The Sickest Warped Tour EP (2007)

Television Off, Party On is the debut extended play by American pop punk band Forever the Sickest Kids. It was released on July 3, 2007, via Universal Motown Records.

== Background ==
In 2006, Forever the Sickest Kids formed after lead vocalist Jonathan Cook spent several hundred dollars for a front-page song placement on PureVolume. Without having any songs written yet, the band wrote "Hey Brittany" and recorded it in two days. The song garned the attention of Universal Motown Records who signed them in April 2007, leading up to the release of Television Off, Party On.

== Composition ==
The group recorded Television Off, Party On four months after signing with Universal Motown Records. Working with producer Geoff Rockwell, the EP was recorded at Rockwell Audio, where Rockwell also engineered the EP, while mixing was handled by Dan Malsch. The tracks "Believe Me, I'm Lying", "She's a Lady", and "Breakdown" were later re-recorded for their 2008 debut studio album Underdog Alma Mater.

== Reception ==
Professional ratings
Review scores
Source	Rating
AbsolutePunk	(81%)
Melodic	3/5 stars
Punktastic	4/5 stars
Scene Trash	5/5 stars

Television Off, Party On was met with positive reviews from music critics. Joe DeAndrea of AbsolutePunk stated, "It's the type of feel good music that'll give you the urge to dance your little hearts out and even give people who are sick of the genre a reason to listen to." Kaj Roth of Melodic described the EP as "pretty good," with praise for the track "Hey Brittany". Roth ended the review by comparing the group to Hellogoodbye. Paul of Punktastic remarked, "The crux of the matter is by the summer of 2008 this lot will be Fall Out Boy big. So get on board now before your little brother or sister goes to see them at the local arena..." Scene Trash described it as "your new not so guilty pleasure, because you'll play it for everyone you meet."

== Track listing ==
All tracks are written by Forever the Sickest Kids.

No.	Title	Length
1.	"Believe Me, I'm Lying"	3:03
2.	"She's a Lady"	4:00
3.	"Becky Starz"	4:02
4.	"Breakdown"	3:34
5.	"I Don't Know About You, But I Came to Dance"	3:21
Total length:		18:00

== Personnel ==
Credits adapted from album's liner notes.

Forever the Sickest Kids

- Jonathan Cook – vocals
- Caleb Turman – vocals, rhythm guitar
- Austin Bello – vocals, bass
- Kyle Burns – drums
- Marc Stewart – lead guitar
- Kent Garrison – keyboards, sampler

Additional musicians

- Geoff Rockwell – percussion, keyboards, sampler
- Ali Sorensen – backing vocals (on "Breakdown")

Production

- Geoff Rockwell – producer, engineering, loops
- Kyle Burns – design, layout
- Dan Malsch – mixing

== Release history ==
Release dates and formats for Television Off, Party On
Region	Date	Format	Label	Ref.
Various	July 3, 2007	CD; digital download	Universal Motown	
United States	June 21, 2024	Vinyl	Field Day	
