= Could It Be You (Punk Rock Chick) =

Single by Brandyn H*Wood Bordeaux (H*Wood)

from the album Four on the Floor
- Released: April 15, 2010
- Recorded: 2009
- Studio: Mark Jackson Productions
- Genre: Pop
- Length: 3:54
- Label: Dark Child; E1; Universal
- Songwriter(s): Brandon Keith Bordeaux; Mark A Jackson; Ian Brendon Scott
- Producer(s): Mark Jackson Productions; Big Syphe

"Could It Be You (Punk Rock Chick)" is an original song that was written, performed, and recorded by American musician and songwriter Brandyn H*Wood Bordeaux (H*Wood). The song's chorus references musicians Rihanna and Lady Gaga.

== Track listing ==
Digital download
No.	Title	Length
1.	"Could It Be You (Punk Rock Chick)"	3:54

Digital EP
No.	Title	Length
1.	"Could It Be You"	3:49
2.	"Parents' Worst Nightmare"	3:31
3.	"Could It Be You (Punk Rock Chick)" (Big Syphe of the Vanguards remix)	4:51
4.	"Could It Be You (Punk Rock Chick)" (music video)	3:51

== Charts ==
Chart (2010–2011)	Peak position
US Bubbling Under Hot 100 (Billboard)	22
US Dance Singles Sales (Billboard)	2
US Heatseeker Songs (Billboard)	22
US Hot R&B/Hip-Hop Singles Sales (Billboard)	4
US Hot Singles Sales (Billboard)	10
US R&B/Hip-Hop Digital Songs (Billboard)	38
