= Underdog Alma Mater =

Studio album by Forever the Sickest Kids
- Released: April 29, 2008
- Recorded: 2007–08
- Studios: Red Bull, Santa Monica, California; Annetenna, Burbank, California
- Genre: Power pop
- Length: 39:50
- Label: Universal Motown
- Producers: Matt Squire; Geoff Rockwell; Matt Mahaffey; Jeff Turzo

Forever the Sickest Kids chronology
Hot Party Jamz (2008)	Underdog Alma Mater (2008)	The Weekend: Friday (2009)

Singles from Underdog Alma Mater
- 1. "Whoa Oh! (Me vs. Everyone)" Released: April 1, 2008; 2. "She's a Lady" Released: July 14, 2008

Underdog Alma Mater is the debut full-length studio album by the American pop punk band Forever the Sickest Kids. It was released on April 29, 2008, by Universal Motown. The album contains some re-recordings of tracks from their debut EP, Television Off, Party On, as well as the singles, "Whoa Oh! (Me vs. Everyone)" and "She's a Lady". The album peaked at number 45 on the Billboard 200. The album was described by music critic Alan Cross as the perfect example of power pop.

== Background ==
Forming in 2006, based in Dallas, Texas, Forever the Sickest Kids' singer Jonathan Cook accidentally spent $350 that the band did not have on PureVolume to receive a front-page placement of a song. The band also did not have any songs written yet. The group wrote the song "Hey Brittany" and recorded it in two days. Soon after, they were signed by Universal Motown. In the mid to late 2000s, a wave of electronic pop rock acts such as PlayRadioPlay!, The Secret Handshake, and Forever the Sickest Kids were rising within the Texas music scene, during a time when hardcore bands were thriving. Drummer Kyle Burns said about the local music scene, "We had to find a way to adapt; we were a pop band in a thriving hardcore scene." The band also signed with Island Records in September 2008.

== Composition ==
Many of the songs from Underdog Alma Mater had already been released in the band's previous EPs. The band's very first EP, Television Off, Party On, featured the tracks "Believe Me, I'm Lying", "She's a Lady", and "Breakdown". However, these tracks have a significantly different sound to them in their respective recordings from the EP and Underdog Alma Mater. On the band's release, The Sickest Warped Tour EP, "Hey Brittany" and "Coffee Break" were featured on it, but were also different from their respective recorded versions on the album. Unlike the other songs, on the band's EP, Hot Party Jamz, the track "That for Me" was featured, but its recording remained the same as it was on the album.

The band recorded the album in Annetenna Studio in Burbank, California and Red Bull Studios in Santa Monica. During the writing of the songs for the album, guitarist Marc Stewart stated, "Our songs are about real stuff that's happened to us because that's what kids want to hear about. They want to listen to stories about things that could happen to them as well, or that already have happened to them."

"Hey Brittney" was the first song the group ever wrote. The track "Believe Me, I'm Lying", written by Austin Bello and Caleb Turman, is based on how Turman once ran into trouble with his girlfriend after he lied to her and left her in tears. Turman stated, "I was hanging out with some other girls, but I told my girlfriend that I was going out by myself. So, the girls and I decided to get some coffee, and as we're walking to the car, my girlfriend pulled up and her headlights were right there in my face. I was totally busted."

"Believe Me, I'm Lying" and the track "My Worst Nightmare" were both written by Bello and Turman and both tracks had originally descended from the duo's former acoustic/electronic project Been Bradley. The original recordings of these two songs are featured on the deluxe edition of Underdog Alma Mater.

== Release ==
Between mid-March and early May 2008, the band participated in the Alternative Press Tour. "Whoa Oh! (Me vs. Everyone)" was released on the band's MySpace page on March 18, 2008. The following day, the track list to Underdog Alma Mater was revealed, which includes five re-recorded songs from their previous EP. "Whoa Oh! (Me vs. Everyone)" was released as the lead single from the album on April 1, 2008. On April 10, a music video was released for the song. Underdog Alma Mater was leaked online on April 17, before it was released on April 29, through Universal Motown Records. The album was made available for streaming on May 2 through Imeem. A couple of days later, the band appeared at the 2008 edition of the Bamboozle festival. Also in May, the group went on a US tour alongside Metro Station, the Maine, the Cab and Danger Radio. Between June and August, the band performed on the 2008 edition of Warped Tour. "She's a Lady" was released on July 11, 2008, as the second single from the album. A music video was released for the song on September 23. "Believe Me, I'm Lying" was released in the UK in 2008, as the group's first promotional single. A free download of "Hurricane Haley" was also made available exclusively in the country on August 25. In October and November, the band supported Cobra Starship on their Sassy Back (Tour) in the US. On October 13, "Whoa Oh (Me vs. Everyone)" was released in the UK and the album was released in the country on October 20, via Island Records.

On February 4, 2009, the band posted a cover of Taylor Swift's "Love Story" online. Later in February, the band went on a tour of Europe, followed by appearances at Soundwave festival in Australia and a tour of Japan, ending in early March. In April, the band performed on the Bamboozle Roadshow and appeared at The Bamboozle festival in early May. Between late June and late August, the band performed on the Warped Tour. On July 7, the deluxe edition of the album was released. It featured the twelve original songs from the album and seventeen additional tracks from the band, mainly from the band's earlier days. A DVD with live shows and other footage was also included, as well.

In 2018, the group released Underdog Alma Mater on vinyl to the celebrate the 10 year anniversary of the album.

== Promotion ==
Fans would receive special bonuses by pre-ordering the album from certain retailers.

- Best Buy
  - Two bonus tracks: "Give & Take (remix)" and "Hurricane Haley"
  - A bonus live video of the band's full set at SXSW
- Interpunk
  - Button, sticker, and signed poster
- iTunes (digital download)
  - Two bonus tracks: "Becky Starz (remix)" and "Indiana"
- Newbury Comics
  - Signed CD booklet
- SmartPunk
  - Autographed poster

== Critical reception ==
Professional ratings
Review scores
Source	Rating
AbsolutePunk.net	(78%)
AllMusic	2/5 stars
Alternative Addiction	3/5 stars
Punknews.org	3.5/5 stars

Underdog Alma Mater was met with generally positive reviews from music critics. Joe DeAndrea of AbsolutePunk.net praised the album for its catchy melodies, infectious chorus' and high production work. He stated, "it becomes obvious that not only does Forever the Sickest Kids have the ability to break through the mainstream, but completely burst through it." He called tracks such as "Hey Brittany" and "She's a Lady" a "harder punch that makes them irresistible." He also praised the song "Whoa Oh! (Me vs. Everyone)" for its simple lyrics and catchy chorus. However, he was critical on the tracks "Believe Me, I'm Lying" and "Coffee Break" calling them "watered down" and "out of place." Overall, he stated that the album would be "people's guiltiest pleasure of the year." Marian Phillips of Alternative Press stated, "They mix synthesizers, tightened guitar riffs and pop-punk lyrics into songs such as 'Hey Brittany' that are unlike any other. Each track on the album is unique in its own way." Alternative Addiction wrote that the album "isn't the break through debut album of the year, but it will definitely do for fans of quality pop-punk in 2008; something that's actually missing."

Jordan Rogowski of Punksnew.org also gave the album a positive review. He complimented the band's songwriting ability and lyrical themes on the album that make them stand out among their peers within the genre. However, Katherine Fulton of AllMusic stated the opposite of that, remarking; "The ultimate goal of a debut album should be to set a band apart from its peers, but it appears that Forever the Sickest Kids have missed that point with Underdog Alma Mater." Despite giving a negative review, she did praise the track "Uh Huh" calling it "light and bouncy." She ended off stating, "they're not enough to make up for what amounts to a shallow debut that shows Forever the Sickest Kids' talent for appropriation, not originality."

=== Accolades ===
Accolades for Underdog Alma Mater
Publication	Accolade	Year	Rank	Ref.
AWMusic	Best Power Pop Record of the Year	2008	3rd	

== Track listing ==
All music is composed by Forever the Sickest Kids, except "Catastrophe" by FTSK and Shep Goodman. All vocals by Jonathan Cook, Austin Bello, and Caleb Turman, except where noted.

No.	Title	Writer(s)	Producer(s)	Length
1.	"Whoa Oh! (Me vs. Everyone)"	Cook; Bello; Turman	Matt Squire; Geoff Rockwell	3:24
2.	"Hey Brittany" (Cook/Turman)	Cook; Bello; Turman	Squire; Rockwell	3:05
3.	"My Worst Nightmare"	Bello; Turman	Matt Mahaffey; Jeff Turzo; Rockwell	3:45
4.	"Believe Me I'm Lying"	Bello; Turman	Squire; Rockwell	3:05
5.	"The Way She Moves"	Bello; Turman	Mahaffey; Turzo; Rockwell	3:42
6.	"She's a Lady"	Cook; Bello; Turman; Marc Stewart	Squire; Rockwell	4:00
7.	"Uh Huh"	Bello; Turman	Mahaffey; Turzo; Rockwell	2:58
8.	"Phone Call"	Bello; Turman	Squire; Rockwell	3:18
9.	"Breakdown" (Cook/Turman)	Cook; Turman	Mahaffey; Turzo; Rockwell	3:37
10.	"That for Me"	Bello; Turman	Squire; Rockwell	2:56
11.	"Coffee Break" (Cook/Turman)	Cook; Turman	Squire; Rockwell	2:40
12.	"Catastrophe"	Bello; Turman; Goodman	Squire; Rockwell	3:18
Total length:				39:50

Best Buy bonus tracks
No.	Title	Writer(s)	Length
13.	"Give and Take (remix)"	Cook; Bello; Turman	2:19
14.	"Hurricane Haley"	Bello; Turman	3:42

iTunes bonus tracks
No.	Title	Writer(s)	Length
13.	"Indiana"	Bello; Turman	3:47
14.	"Becky Starz (remix)"	Cook; Bello; Turman	3:47

UK bonus track
No.	Title	Writer(s)	Length
13.	"The Party Song"	Cook; Bello; Turman	3:30

Deluxe edition track listing
No.	Title	Writer(s)	Length
1.	"Intro"	Cook; Bello; Turman; Burns; Stewart; Kent Garrison	0:19
2.	"Whoa Oh! (Me vs. Everyone)"	Cook; Bello; Turman	3:24
3.	"Hey Brittany" (Cook/Turman)	Cook; Bello; Turman	3:05
4.	"My Worst Nightmare"	Bello; Turman	3:45
5.	"Believe Me I'm Lying"	Bello; Turman	3:05
6.	"The Way She Moves"	Bello; Turman	3:42
7.	"She's a Lady"	Cook; Bello; Turman; Stewart	4:00
8.	"Uh Huh"	Bello; Turman	2:58
9.	"Phone Call"	Bello; Turman	3:18
10.	"Breakdown" (Cook/Turman)	Cook; Turman	3:37
11.	"That for Me"	Bello; Turman	2:56
12.	"Coffee Break" (Cook/Turman)	Cook; Turman	2:40
13.	"Catastrophe"	Bello; Turman; Goodman	3:18
14.	"Middletro"	Cook; Bello; Turman; Burns; Stewart; Garrison	0:15
15.	"Believe Me I'm Lying (original demo)" (Bello/Turman)	Bello; Turman	1:59
16.	"Indiana (hotel demo)" (Bello/Turman)	Bello; Turman	2:44
17.	"Who Invited the Monster" (Bello)	Bello	1:53
18.	"Bundled Up" (Cook)	Cook; Bello; Turman	2:47
19.	"Uh Huh (Demo)"	Bello; Turman	1:40
20.	"Catastrophe (acoustic demo)"	Bello; Turman; Goodman	2:53
21.	"Believe Me I'm Lying" (featuring Chae Hawk)	Bello; Turman; Chae Hawk; Geoff Rockwell	3:52
22.	"My Worst Nightmare (demo)" (Bello/Turman)	Bello; Turman	1:21
23.	"Give and Take (acoustic demo)"	Cook; Bello; Turman	1:22
24.	"Give and Take (remix)"	Cook; Bello; Turman	2:19
25.	"Heat Wave Jam Out" (Cook)	Cook	1:35
26.	"The Party Song"	Cook; Bello; Turman	3:30
27.	"Love Story" (Cook)	Taylor Swift	3:24
28.	"Cop Car (demo)"	Cook; Bello; Turman	3:14
29.	"Outro"	Cook; Bello; Turman; Burns; Stewart; Garrison	0:08

Deluxe edition bonus DVD
No.	Title	Length
1.	"To the Show"
2.	"Alien Encounters"
3.	"Battle of the Bands"
4.	"The Death of Scuz"
5.	"Forever the Sickest Epilogue"
6.	"1755 Live"
7.	"In the Mix"
8.	"She's a Lady" (music video)
9.	"She's a Lady" (UK music video)
10.	"Behind the Video of Whoa Oh! (Me vs. Everyone)"
11.	"Whoa Oh! (Me vs. Everyone)" (music video)
12.	"Jumping (Out the Window)" (music video)
13.	"London September 2008"
14.	"London September 2008 part 2"
15.	"London September 2008 part 3"
16.	"London September 2008 part 4 – 'Whoa Oh! (Me vs. Everyone)'"
17.	"London September 2008 part 5 – 'She's a Lady'"
18.	"London September 2008 part 6 – 'Hey Brittany'"

== Personnel ==
Credits for Underdog Alma Mater adapted from AllMusic.

Forever the Sickest Kids

- Jonathan Cook – vocals
- Austin Bello – bass guitar, vocals
- Caleb Turman – rhythm guitar, vocals
- Marc Stewart – lead guitar
- Kent Garrison – keyboards, synthesizers
- Kyle Burns – drums, percussion

Additional musicians

- Matt Mahaffey – backing vocals, keyboards
- Greg Suran – acoustic guitar
- Jeff Turzo – keyboards

Production

- Jennifer Beal – production director
- Tom Coyne – mastering
- Chris Graham – creative director
- Shep Goodman – A&R
- William Green – management
- Evan Hunt – photography
- Jessica Johnson – product manager
- Tom Lord-Alge – mixing
- Matt Mahaffey – engineering, producer
- Robi Menace – management
- Rosa Menkes – art direction
- Tommy Quon – management
- Geoff Rockwell – producer
- Matt Squire – engineering, producer
- Eric Stenman – digital editing, engineering
- Jeff Turzo – engineering, producer
- Cover concept and Underdog Alma Mater emblem illustration by Kyle Burns

== Charts ==
Chart performance for Underdog Alma Mater
Chart (2008)	Peak position
US Billboard 200 (Billboard)	45
US Top Alternative Albums (Billboard)	9
US Top Rock Albums (Billboard)	13

== Release history ==
Release dates and formats for Underdog Alma Mater
Region	Date	Edition	Format	Label	Ref.
United States	April 29, 2008	CD; digital download	Standard	Universal Motown	
Various	April 29, 2008	Digital download	Standard	Universal Motown	
Japan	July 2, 2008	CD	Standard	Universal Motown	
United Kingdom	October 20, 2008	CD; digital download	Standard	Universal Motown	
United States	July 7, 2009	CD; digital download	Deluxe	Universal Motown	
Various	July 7, 2009	Digital download	Deluxe	Universal Motown	
United States	October 19, 2018	LP; vinyl	Standard	Universal; Republic; Field Day	
