= Set It Off (Set It Off album) =

Studio album by Set It Off
- Released: November 7, 2025
- Genres: Alternative metal, nu metal, post hardcore
- Length: 37:05
- Producers: Jon Lundin; Erik Ron; Andrew Baylis

Set It Off chronology
Elsewhere (2022)	Set It Off (2025)

Singles from Set It Off
- 1. "Punching Bag" Released: March 24, 2023; 2. "Evil People" Released: October 27, 2023; 3. "Parasite" Released: December 8, 2023; 4. "Fake Ass Friends" Released: March 1, 2024; 5. "Creating Monsters" Released: September 13, 2024; 6. "Wolf In Sheep's Clothing [REBORN]" Released: November 1, 2024; 7. "Rotten" Released: June 27, 2025; 8. "Pathological" Released: October 17, 2025

Set It Off is the sixth studio album by American rock band Set It Off. The album was released on November 7, 2025, as their first self-released album since their departure from Fearless Records.

== Promotion and release ==
After becoming independent, Set It Off started to continuously release singles, with the first being "Punching Bag" on March 24, 2023. Another single, "Win Win", featuring Scene Queen was released on May 5, 2023, but didn't make it to the album. As time passed, the band kept releasing singles like "Fake Ass Friends" and "Creating Monsters" alongside a re-recording of their song "Wolf In Sheep's Clothing" from their album Duality without an album announcement on sight.

With the release of the album’s 7th single, "Rotten", on June 27, 2025, Set It Off announced their self-titled album. Finally, the eight and last single of the album, "Pathological", was released a few weeks before the album, on October 17, 2025.

While they made a lot of tours since their independence, only "The Self-titled Tour" was made to support the release of their self-titled album, with supporters Fame On Fire, Vana and The Pretty Wild.

== Critical reception ==
Professional ratings
Review scores
Source	Rating
Classic Rock	6/10
Distorted Sound	3/10
Kerrang!	4/5

The album received mixed reviews from critics. Emma Wilkes from Kerrang! wrote "Arguably, Set It Off are at their best when their past and present converge. Their orchestral-tinged theatricality of yore has been put down and picked up again but embracing it all over again feels like a conscious celebration of their individuality." In a more negative review, Ed Walton of Distorted Sound stated "If you do like this, then fair enough but to those who are a casual listener who dips in and out of any kind of music, this album is the musical equivalent of an opened, flat can of Monster that lost its taste quite some time ago."

== Track listing ==
All tracks are produced by Jon Lundin, except where noted.

All tracks are written by Cody Carson and Jon Lundin, except where noted.

Set It Off track listing
No.	Title	Writer(s)	Producer(s)	Length
1.	"Pathological"			2:53
2.	"Punching Bag"			2:58
3.	"Rotten"			3:33
4.	"Switch"	Carson; Cameron Walker; Dan Pellarin; Andrew Baylis	Baylis	2:50
5.	"Fake Ass Friends"			2:20
6.	"What's In It For Me?"	Carson; Erik Ron; Lundin	Ron	3:30
7.	"Evil People"			3:24
8.	"Wolf In Sheep's Clothing [REBORN]"	Carson; Brandon Paddock; Ron; Dan Clermont		3:20
9.	"Vicious Cycle"	Carson; Ron	Ron	2:48
10.	"Creating Monsters"	Carson; Bruce Wiegner; Lundin		2:50
11.	"Parasite"	Carson; Zach Jones; Lundin		2:46
12.	"Worst Case Scenarios"			3:53
Total length:				37:05

== Personnel ==
Credits adapted from Apple Music

Set It Off

- Cody Carson – Vocals
- Zach Dewall – Guitar
- Maxx Danziger – drums

Production

- Jon Lundin – Producer, engineer, mixing, co-producer (4, 6, 9)
- Andrew Baylis - Producer (4)
- Erik Ron - Producer (6, 9)
- Jordan Kulp - Assistant engineer (1, 4, 12)
- Anthony Reeder - Recording engineer (6, 9)
- Ted Jensen – Mastering
