= Elsewhere (Set It Off album) =

Studio album by Set It Off
- Released: March 11, 2022
- Genres: Pop; pop rock
- Length: 48:10
- Label: Fearless
- Producers: Brandon Paddock; Mike Green; Bruce Wiegner; Nico Hartikainen

Set It Off chronology
Midnight (2019)	Elsewhere (2022)	Set It Off (2025)

Singles from Elsewhere
- 1. "Skeleton" Released: October 29, 2021; 2. "Projector" Released: January 21, 2022; 3. "Who's in Control" Released: February 18, 2022; 4. "Why Do I" Released: April 26, 2022; 5. "Dangerous" Released: November 4, 2022

Elsewhere is the fifth studio album by American rock band Set It Off. The album was released on March 11, 2022, by record label Fearless Records, being their last album released under this label before going independent in 2023. It is also the band's first album after the departure of Dan Clermont, and as a three-piece group.

== Promotion and release ==
The first single of the album before its announcement was "Skeleton" on October 29, 2021, which was accompanied with a music video. The second single, "Projector", was released on January 21, 2022, along with a music video. That same day, the band announced the official album's track listing and cover art. The third single of the album, "Who's in Control", was released on February 18. The fourth single of the album, "Why Do I", was released on April 26, with a music video. The fifth and last single of the album, "Dangerous", was released on November 4, with a music video.

The band announced the "Welcome to Elsewhere tour" to promote the album in United States with special guests Stand Atlantic, As It Is and No Love for the Middle Child. The tour will take place on January and February 2022. In July, they announced the "Welcome to Elsewhere tour Part 2", hitting the road with Oximorrons, Rain City Drive, Concrete Castles and Weathers.

They also announced a European tour with supporters Weathers, Cemetery Sun and Lizzy Farrall.

== Critical reception ==
Professional ratings
Review scores
Source	Rating
Kerrang!	3/5
Distorted Sound	7/10
DIY	2/5 stars
Wall of Sound	8,5/10

The album received mixed reviews from critics. Aliya Chaudhry from Kerrang! wrote "This fifth album sees the band experimenting even more and wearing their varied influences on their sleeves, whether it's R&B, hip-hop or 2000s pop." Izzi Sheldon of Distorted Sound stated "There could have been more range in this album, but the songs themselves are all enjoyable and include fun elements such as the wind and string instruments and the rap sections." In a more negative review, Alisdair Grace of DIY stated that the album "feels like you're stuck on the spinning teacups at the local circus."

== Track listing ==
All tracks are written by Cody Carson.

"Elsewhere" track listing
No.	Title	Producer(s)	Length
1.	"Skeleton"	Bruce Wiegner	3:23
2.	"Projector"	Mike Green	3:12
3.	"Cut Off"	Green; Nico Hartikainen	3:07
4.	"Loose Cannon"	Brandon Paddock	2:47
5.	"Why Do I"	Paddock	2:35
6.	"As Good as It Gets"	Wiegner	2:57
7.	"Who's in Control"	Green; Hartikainen	3:05
8.	"Taste of the Good Life"	Green; Hartikainen	3:26
9.	"Why Not Me"	Green; Wiegnier	2:37
10.	"Dangerous"	Jordan Witzigreuter	2:04
11.	"Cordial"	Green; Hartikainen	3:06
12.	"The Magic 8"	Green; Hartikainen	3:04
13.	"Playing with Bad Luck"	Wiegner	2:58
14.	"Peekaboo"	Green	2:51
15.	"Catch a Break"	Green	3:06
16.	"Better Than This"	Paddock	3:45
Total length:			48:10

== Personnel ==
Credits adapted from Allmusic

Set It Off

- Cody Carson – Vocals
- Zach Dewall – Guitar
- Maxx Danziger – drums

Additional musicians

- Andrew Joslyn - String arrangements (Violin, Viola)
- Cameron Walker-Wright - Guitar
- Eli Weinberger - Cello

Production

- Brandon Paddock – producer, engineer
- Bruce Wiegner - Producer, engineer
- Clint Moody - Assistant engineer
- Niko Hartikainen - Producer, Keyboards
- Jordan Witzigreuter - Producer, Engineer (10)
- Seth Drake – mixing, mastering

Other

- Danin Jackuay – Photography
- Sage Lamonica – Package Design

== Charts ==
Chart (2019)	Peak position
UK Album Downloads Chart	80
UK Albums Sales Chart	82
UK Physical Albums Chart	96
US Top Current Album Sales (Billboard)	88
