= Upside Down (Set It Off album) =

2016 album by Set It Off

Studio album by Set It Off
- Released: October 7, 2016
- Studio: Grey Area Studios (North Hollywood, Los Angeles)
- Genre: Pop rock
- Length: 41:20
- Label: Equal Vision; Rude
- Producer: Brandon Paddock; Erik Ron; Rogét Chahayed; Mike Green; Andrew Goldstein

Set It Off chronology
Duality (2014)	Upside Down (2016)	Midnight (2019)

Singles from Upside Down
- 1. "Uncontainable" Released: March 18, 2016; 2. "Something New" Released: June 29, 2016; 3. "Life Afraid" Released: August 4, 2016; 4. "Hypnotized" Released: April 17, 2017

Upside Down is the third studio album by American rock band Set It Off. The album was released on October 7, 2016, through record labels Equal Vision Records and Rude Records. It is the first album of the band as a quartet after the departure of bassist Austin Kerr in 2015.

== Promotion and release ==
The first single from the album, "Uncontainable", was released on March 18, 2016, alongside the announcement of Upside Down. The second single of the album, "Something New", was released on June 29, with a music video. That same day, the band revealed the track listing and the art cover of the album. The third single of the album, "Life Afraid", was released on August 4, with a lyric video. A music video of the song was published in the band's official youtube channel the same day the album was released. The fourth and last single of the album, "Hypnotized", was released on April 17, 2017, with a music video.

== Critical reception ==
The album received average reviews from critics. Matt Collar from Allmusic wrote that the album "is another stylistically robust effort that finds Set it Off incorporating their love of hip-hop, R&B, and hooky pop into their infectious punk style."

Professional ratings
Review scores
Source	Rating
Spectrum Culture	3/5 stars
Upset	3/5 stars

== Track listing ==
Upside Down track listing
No.	Title	Writer(s)	Producer(s)	Length
1.	"Something New"	Cody Carson; Dan Clermont; Brandon Paddock; Alex Gaskarth	Paddock	3:25
2.	"Uncontainable"	Carson; Clermont; Erik Ron	Ron	2:59
3.	"Life Afraid"	Carson; Clermont; Paddock; Rogét Chahayed	Paddock; Chahayed	3:00
4.	"Upside Down"	Carson; Paddock	Paddock	3:35
5.	"Want"	Carson; Clermont; Paddock; Ron	Paddock; Ron	3:57
6.	"Diamond Girl"	Carson; Clermont; Paddock; Rami Jrade	Paddock	3:46
7.	"Tug of War"	Carson; Clermont; Green	Green	3:55
8.	"Admit It"	Carson; Clermont; Ron	Green	3:23
9.	"Hypnotized"	Carson; Clermont; Paddock; Chahayed	Paddock; Chahayed	3:44
10.	"Never Know"	Carson; Clermont; Ron	Ron	3:14
11.	"Crutch"	Carson; Andrew Goldstein; Kevin Fisher	Goldstein	3:04
12.	"Me w/o Us"	Carson; Clermont; Ron	Ron	3:18
Total length:				41:20

== Personnel ==
Credits adapted from Allmusic.

Set It Off

- Cody Carson – vocals, instruments, composition, arrangement, programming
- Zach Dewall – guitar
- Maxx Danziger – drums
- Dan Clermont – guitars, vocals, composition, arrangement, programming, instruments

Background vocals

- Ahmad Alkurabi
- Anna Fisher
- Brigitte Knowlson
- Callie Castillo
- Erin Reagan
- Henry Lunette
- Kirsten Collins
- Nick Morzov
- Paul Slater
- Sam Broucke

Production

- Brandon Paddock - arrangement, composition, producer, mixing, programming, instruments
- Erik Ron - arrangement, composition, producer, mixing, programming, instruments
- Mike Green - arrangement, composition, producer, programming, instruments
- Andrew Goldstein - arrangement, composition, producer, programing, instruments
- Rogét Chahayed - arrangement, composition, programming, instruments
- UE Nastasi - mastering

Additional composers

- Alex Gaskarth
- Kevin Fisher
- Rami Jrade

Other

- Jonathan Weiner – photography
- Bill Scoville – layout
- Francesa Caldara - A&R

== Charts ==
Chart (2016)	Peak position
UK Album Downloads Chart	91
US Billboard 200	51
US Top Album Sales (Billboard)	22
US Top Alternative Albums (Billboard)	11
US Top Rock Albums (Billboard)	13
