= Set It Off =

Set It Off may refer to:

== Albums ==
- Set It Off (Offset album), 2023
- Set It Off (Thousand Foot Krutch album) or the title song, 2000
- Set It Off (Set It Off album), 2025
- Set It Off, by Madball, 1994
- Set It Off, by Shuvel, or the title song, 2000
- Set It Off, by Shy FX and T Power, 2002

== Songs ==
- "Set It Off" (J. Williams song), 2008
- "Set It Off" (Juvenile song), 2001
- "Set It Off" (Peaches song), 2001
- "Set It Off" (Timomatic song), 2011
- "Set It Off" (Young Gunz song), 2005
- "Set It Off", by Audioslave from Audioslave, 2002
- "Set It Off", by Big Daddy Kane from Long Live the Kane, 1988
- "Set It Off", by Bryson Tiller from True to Self, 2017
- "Set It Off", by Evil Nine from They Live, 2008
- "Set It Off", by Jason Aldean from Rearview Town, 2018
- "Set It Off", by Kardinal Offishall from Not 4 Sale, 2008
- "Set It Off", by Main Source from Fuck What You Think, 1994
- "Set It Off", by Nicki Minaj from Sucka Free, 2008
- "Set It Off", by N.O.R.E from Noreality, 2007
- "Set It Off", by P.O.D. from Satellite, 2001
- "Set It Off", by Snoop Dogg from Tha Last Meal, 2000
- "Set It Off", by Strafe, 1984
- "Set It Off", from the Descendants film soundtrack, 2015

== Other uses ==
- Set It Off (band), an American multi-genre rock band
- Set It Off (film), a 1996 America crime action film
