= Midnight (Set It Off album) =

2019 album by Set It Off

Studio album by Set It Off
- Released: February 1, 2019
- Genre: Pop; pop rock; emo
- Length: 51:07
- Label: Fearless
- Producer: Mike Green; Brandon Paddock; Jordan Witzigreuter

Set It Off chronology
| Upside Down (2016) | Midnight (2019) | Elsewhere (2022) |

Expanded edition cover

Singles from Midnight
- 1. "Killer in the Mirror" Released: July 24, 2018; 2. "Lonely Dance" Released: November 19, 2018; 3. "Dancing With The Devil" Released: December 14, 2018; 4. "For You Forever" Released: December 14, 2018; 5. "Midnight Thoughts" Released: January 1, 2019; 6. "Hourglass" Released: June 21, 2019

Midnight is the fourth studio album by American rock band Set It Off. The album was released on February 1, 2019 by record label Fearless Records, being their album debut under this label and their last album as a quartet following Dan Clermont's departure after the album's release.

== Background ==
The band changed all of their social media profile photos to a solid blue hue on July 19, 2018. The next days, they posted more teasers heavily focused on: the color blue, the 12:00, an hourglass and the tick of a clock in the background.

== Promotion and release ==
=== Original release ===
The band announced their signing with Fearless Records with the release of "Killer in the Mirror", the first single of the album, on July 24, 2018. The second single of the album, "Lonely Dance", was released on November 19, with a music video. That same day, the band officially announced Midnight, revealing the track listing, the cover art and the release date. One month later, on December 14, they released the third and fourth singles of the album, "Dancing With The Devil" and "For You Forever". To celebrate the new year, they released "Midnight Thoughts", the fifth single of the album, on January 1, 2019. The sixth and last single of the album "Hourglass" was released on June 21 along with a new music video.

They announced "The Midnight World Tour" which consisted of four parts. The Part 1 took place in North America on February and March 2019, with supporters With Confidence and Super Whatevr. Part 2 took place in UK and Europe in April 2019. Part 3 took place in North America on June and July 2019, with supporters Emarosa, Broadside and Lizzy Farrall. Finally, the Part 4 of the tour, which took place in UK and Europe, had been rescheduled multiple times because of Cody Carson's vocal injury and Coronavirus pandemy.

=== The Final Chapter/Expanded Edition ===
After the release of the album the band released three Digital B-sides: "Catch Me If You Can" on December 13, 2019, "So Predictable" on January 3, 2020 and "One Single Second" on February 14. The three singles were taken from their EP After Midnight, which also released on February 14. The band later announced Midnight: The Final Chapter (which contained the contents of the original album and the EP), with the release of an acoustic version of "Killer in the mirror" on May 7, 2021, set to release on June 4 of the same year only by digital streaming. Two more acoustic versions were released: "Lonely Dance" on May 21 and "Happy All the Time" on the same day the expanded edition was released. A music video for the acoustic version of "Happy All the Time" was published on July 13.

== Critical reception ==
Professional ratings
Review scores
| Source | Rating |
|---|---|
| Distorted Sound | 6/10 |
| The Shape Of A Sound | 3.5/5 stars |
| Wall of Sound | 7/10 |

The album received positive reviews from critics. Walladmin from Wall of Sound stated that "As a pop album Midnight is a solid effort, with some amazing vocals and ridiculously catchy choruses." Matt Collar from Allmusic wrote that the album "finds the Florida outfit continuing to expand their emo and punk influences with hip-hop and dance influences."

== Track listing ==
All tracks are produced by Mike Green except were noted.

All tracks are written by Cody Carson, Dan Clermont and Mike Green, except otherwise noted.

Midnight track listing
| No. | Title | Writer(s) | Producer(s) | Length |
|---|---|---|---|---|
| 1. | "Killer in the Mirror" | Carson; Clermont; Green; Simon Wilcox | | 3:35 |
| 2. | "Hourglass" | Carson; Clermont; Green; Wilcox | | 2:57 |
| 3. | "Lonely Dance" | Carson; Clermont; Green; Cameron Walker-Wright | | 3:10 |
| 4. | "Different Songs" | Carson; Clermont; Green; her0ism; Eben Wares | Green; Brandon Paddock | 3:46 |
| 5. | "For You Forever" | Carson; Clermont; Green; Paddock | Paddock | 3:12 |
| 6. | "Dancing with the Devil" | Carson; Clermont; Green; John Gomez; Stephen Gomez | | 3:22 |
| 7. | "Go to Bed Angry" (featuring KC) | Carson; Clermont; Green; Erik Ron | | 3:11 |
| 8. | "Midnight Thoughts" | Carson; Clermont; Green; Paddock | Green; Paddock | 2:57 |
| 9. | "Criminal Minds" | Carson; Clermont; Green; Nico Hartikainen | Green; Paddock | 2:43 |
| 10. | "No Disrespect" | Carson; Clermont; Green; Hartikainen; Bruce Weigner | | 3:39 |
| 11. | "Stitch Me Up" | Carson; Clermont; Green; Jayden Seeley | | 3:19 |
| 12. | "Raise No Fool" | Carson; Clermont; Green; Hartikainen | Green; Paddock | 3:49 |
| 13. | "I Want You (Gone)" (featuring Matt Appleton) | Carson; Clermont; Green; Hartikainen | | 3:30 |
| 14. | "Unopened Windows" | | Green; Paddock | 4:18 |
| 15. | "Happy All the Time" (featuring Skyler Acord) | Carson; Clermont; Green; Skyler Acord | | 3:39 |
| Total length: | | | | 51:07 |

Expanded Edition bonus tracks
| No. | Title | Writer(s) | Producer(s) | Length |
|---|---|---|---|---|
| 16. | "One Single Second" | | | 3:42 |
| 17. | "So Predictable" | Carson; Clermont; Walker; Jordan Witzigreuter | Green; Witzigreuter | 3:01 |
| 18. | "Catch Me If You Can" | Carson; Clermont; Green; Wares | | 2:59 |
| 19. | "Killer in the Mirror - Acoustic" | Carson; Clermont; Green; Wilcox | | 4:22 |
| 20. | "Lonely Dance - Acoustic" | Carson; Clermont; Green; Walker | | 3:43 |
| 21. | "Happy All the Time - Acoustic" (featuring Skyler Acord & Compton Kidz Club) | Carson; Clermont; Green; Acord | | 3:38 |
| Total length: | | | | 1:12:32 |

== Personnel ==
Credits adapted from Allmusic.

Set It Off

- Cody Carson – Vocals, Composer
- Zach Dewall – Guitar
- Maxx Danziger – Drums, Percussion
- Dan Clermont – Guitar, Composer

Featured Artists

- KC - Vocals (7)
- Matt Appleton - Vocals (13)
- Skyler Acord - Vocals (15, 21)
- Compton Kidz Club - Chorus (21)

Production

- Mike Green - Composer, mastering, Producer, mixing, Recording, Recording Producer
- Brandon Paddock - Composer, Producer, mixing
- Jordan Witzigreuter - Composer, Producer, Recording Producer (17)

Additional Composers

- Bruce Wiegner (10)
- Cameron Walker (3, 17, 20)
- Eben Wares (4, 18)
- Erik Ron (7)
- Her0ism (4)
- Jayden Seeley (11)
- John Gomez (6)
- Nico Hartikainen (9, 10, 12, 13)
- Simon Wilcox (1, 2, 19)
- Skyler Acord (15, 21)
- Stephen Gomez (6)

== Charts ==
| Chart (2019) | Peak position |
|---|---|
| Scottish Albums (OCC) | 81 |
| UK Album Downloads Chart | 35 |
| UK Albums Sales Chart | 75 |
| US Billboard 200 | 86 |
| US Top Album Sales (Billboard) | 8 |
| US Top Alternative Albums (Billboard) | 8 |
| US Top Rock Albums (Billboard) | 11 |
