= Duality (Set It Off album) =

2014 album by Set It Off

Studio album by Set It Off
- Released: October 14, 2014
- Genre: Pop-punk; R&B
- Length: 37:35
- Label: Equal Vision; Rude
- Producer: Brandon Paddock; Tommy English; Matt Appleton

Set It Off chronology
| Cinematics (2012) | Duality (2014) | Upside Down (2016) |

Alternate album cover

Singles from Duality
- 1. "Why Worry" Released: September 9, 2014; 2. "N.M.E." Released: September 22, 2014; 3. "Tomorrow" Released: October 2, 2014; 4. "Ancient History" Released: March 2, 2015; 5. "Forever Stuck In Our Youth" Released: June 4, 2015; 6. "The Haunting" Released: December 17, 2015; 7. "Duality" Released: January 14, 2016

Duality is the second studio album by American rock band Set It Off. The album was released on October 14, 2014 through record labels Equal Vision Records and Rude Records.

The song "Wolf In Sheep's Clothing" has been certified Platinum by the RIAA, indicating equivalent sales of 1,000,000 copies in the United States, on June 14, 2024.

== Writing and recording ==
The band started recording the album with producer John Feldmann. Due to personal reasons that were completely out of their and Feldmann's hands, they had to switch producers and engineers. They ended up working with Brandon Paddock, Tommy English and Matt Appleton. All the tracks were written by Cody Carson and Dan Clermont, taking inspiration from Cody's past relationships and their experiences as a band.

== Promotion and release ==
The album was announced on August 13, 2014, alongside the announcement of a tour with rock bands Black Veil Brides and Falling in Reverse. The lead single of the album was "Why Worry" and it was released on September 9. The second single of the album, "N.M.E.", was released on 22 of the same month. The third single, "Tomorrow", was released on October 2. The day the album was released, the band premiered a music video for "Why Worry". The band also released a music video for "Tomorrow" on December 30, were some fans said why the band is so special for them. The fourth single, "Ancient History", was released on May 2, 2015, with a music video. The fifth single, "Forever Stuck In Our Youth" was released on June 4, with a music video. The sixth single "The Haunting" was released on December 17, alongside a music video of the band performing the song live. The seventh and last single of the album, "Duality", was released on January 14, 2016, with a music video.

== Critical reception ==
Professional ratings
Aggregate scores
| Source | Rating |
|---|---|
| Metacritic | 81/100 |
Review scores
| Source | Rating |
| AllMusic | 3.5/5 stars |
| Alternative Press | 3/5 stars |
| Kerrang! | 5/5 stars |
| Rock Sound | 9/10 |
| Sputnikmusic | 3/5 |

The album received generally positive reviews from critics. At Metacritic (a review aggregator site which assigns a normalised rating out of 100 from music critics), based on 4 critics, the album has received a score of 81/100, which indicates "universal acclaim".

Andy Ritchie of Rock Sound calls Duality "a full-blown orchestral dance-pop masterpiece that will make you throw your arms in the air with glee, even if you think you should know better." Gameofmetal of Sputnikmusic stated "While too many songs lack memorability, the ones that don’t are sure to be ingrained in your head."

== Track listing ==
All tracks are produced by Brandon Paddock, except where noted.

All tracks are written by Cody Carson, Dan Clermont and Brandon Paddock, except were noted.

Duality track listing
| No. | Title | Writer(s) | Producer(s) | Length |
|---|---|---|---|---|
| 1. | "The Haunting" | | | 2:52 |
| 2. | "N.M.E." | Carson; Clermont; Paddock; Neal Avron | | 3:28 |
| 3. | "Forever Stuck in Our Youth" | | | 3:13 |
| 4. | "Why Worry" | | | 3:19 |
| 5. | "Ancient History" | Carson; Clermont; Paddock; Tommy English; Nick Long | Paddock; English | 3:13 |
| 6. | "Bleak December" | | | 3:06 |
| 7. | "Duality" | Carson; Paddock | | 4:02 |
| 8. | "Wolf in Sheep's Clothing" (featuring William Beckett) | Carson; Clermont; Paddock; Erik Ron | | 3:07 |
| 9. | "Tomorrow" (featuring Jason Lancaster) | Carson; Clermont; Paddock; English | Paddock; English | 3:35 |
| 10. | "Bad Guy" | Carson; Clermont; Paddock; Khris Lorenz | | 3:09 |
| 11. | "Miss Mysterious" | Carson; Paddock | | 4:31 |
| Total length: | | | | 37:35 |

Notes

- The title of "N.M.E." when spoken aloud sounds identical to the word "enemy", and serves as an acronym for "no more excuses".

== Personnel ==
Credits adapted from Allmusic

Set It Off

- Cody Carson – Vocals, Backing Vocals, Composer
- Zach Dewall – Guitar
- Maxx Danziger – Drums
- Dan Clermont – Guitar, Composer,
- Austin Kerr - Bass

Background Vocals

- Amie Zimmerman
- Conrad Snyder
- Gabe Simon
- Holly Parker
- Jose Villanueva
- Kacie Yarnell
- Matt Morgan
- Stevie Aiello
- Tom Schleiter

Additional musicians

- Andy Cuadra - Piano
- William Beckett - Featured vocals (8)
- Jason Lancaster - Featured Vocals (9)

Production

- Brandon Paddock - Arranger, Composer, Producer, mixing, Programming, Instrumentation, Backing Vocals
- Matt Appleton - engineer, Horn Arrangements, Instrumentation
- Tommy English - Arranger, Composer, Producer, Mixing, Programming, Instrumentation, Guitar
- Joe LaPorta - mastering

Additional Production

- David Irish - Engineer
- Erik Ron - Composer
- Khris Lorenz - Composer
- Neal Avron - Composer
- Nick Long - Composer

Other

- Chris Martin – Photography
- Francesa Caldara - A&R

== Charts ==
| Chart (2014) | Peak position |
|---|---|
| US Billboard 200 | 86 |
| US Top Album Sales (Billboard) | 86 |
| US Top Alternative Albums (Billboard) | 14 |
| US Top Hard Rock Albums (Billboard) | 6 |
| US Top Rock Albums (Billboard) | 25 |
