= Erik Ron =

American record producer

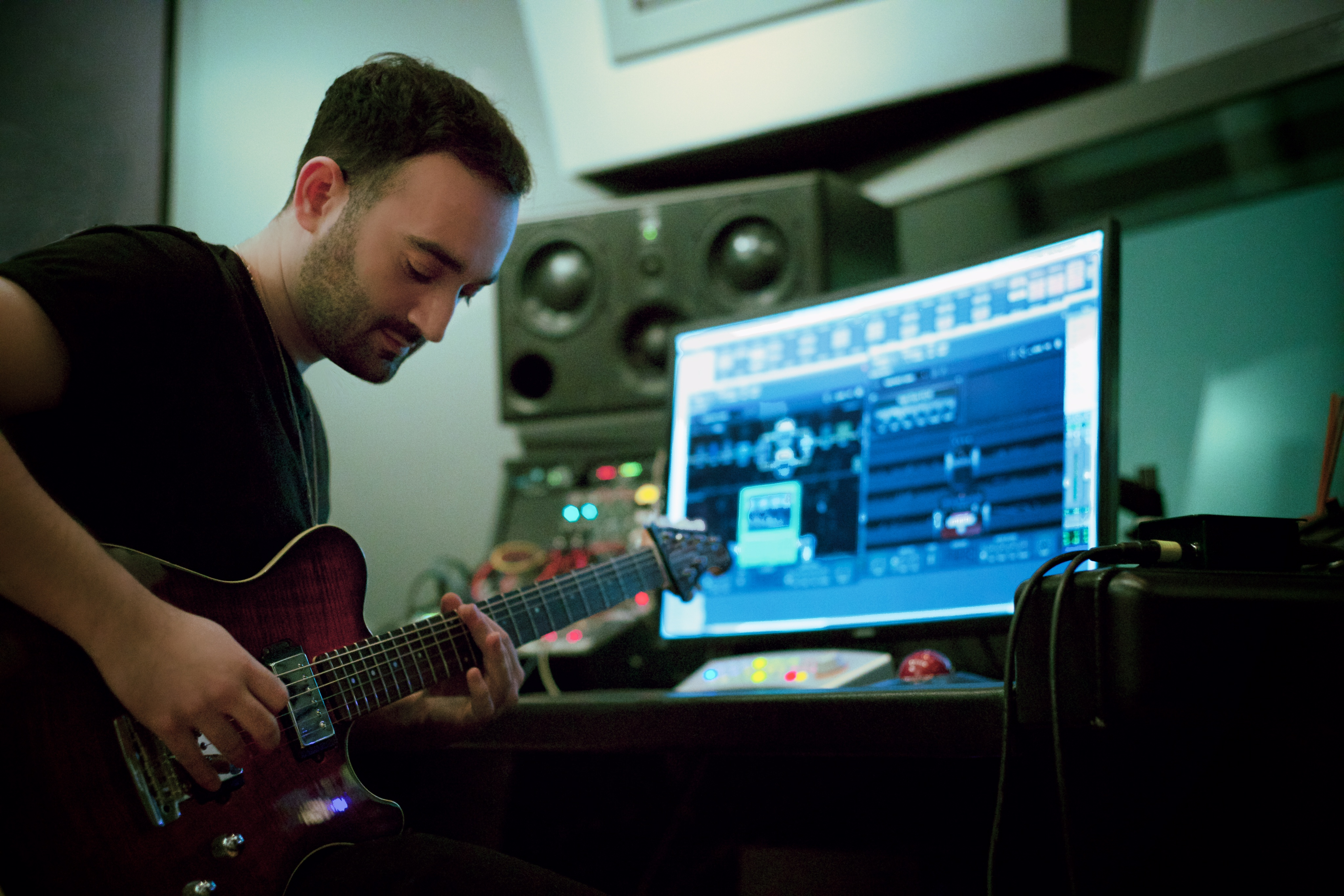
- Erik Ron in 2016

Background information
- Born: July 4, 1985 (age 41); San Carlos, California, U.S.
- Genres: Alternative rock; post-hardcore; metalcore; heavy metal; hard rock; pop punk; punk rock; hardcore punk; screamo
- Occupations: Record producer; songwriter; mixing engineer
- Years active: 2006–present
- Formerly of: Impel
- Website: erikron.com

Erik Ron (born July 4, 1985) is an American producer, mixer, and songwriter based in Los Angeles. He has worked with artists such as Panic! at the Disco, Set It Off, Issues, New Years Day, Too Close to Touch, I the Mighty, Motionless In White, I Wish We Were Robots, Blessthefall, I See Stars, Sylar, Attila, Godsmack, Staind, and Bush.

== Life and career ==
=== Early years ===
Erik Ron was born in San Francisco, California, and grew up in the suburb of San Carlos, California, where he attended Carlmont High School. As a teenager, Erik began his music career by playing in the alternative rock band Impel. After high school, he studied engineering at Musicians Institute College of Contemporary Music in Los Angeles. Erik worked as in-house engineer at Woodland Ranch Studio from 2005 to 2008. He then served as an engineer under producer and writer, John Feldmann in Bel Air, CA, from 2008 and 2011.

=== 2013–present ===
In 2013, Erik built and opened "Grey Area Studios" in North Hollywood. Since opening the studio to focus on his own production career, Erik has worked with Panic! at the Disco, Set It Off, Issues, New Years Day, Too Close to Touch, I Prevail, Motionless in White, This Wild Life, Young Guns, The Word Alive, Blessthefall, I See Stars, Palisades, Sylar, and Attila, and more. In early 2016, Erik Ron inked an exclusive publishing deal with BMG Rights Management.

In September 2017, it was announced that Ron will be at the helm of the seventh studio album of the rock band Godsmack.

== Production discography ==
Year	Artist	Album title	Label	Credits
2006	After Midnight Project	The Becoming (EP)	Self-released	Engineer (track 1)
2006	Gran Bel Fisher	Full Moon Cigarette	Hollywood Records	Editing
2006	Sparta	Threes	Hollywood, Anti-	Additional engineering
2007	Shannon Noll	Turn It Up	Sony BMG	Vocal engineer
2008	Undies Kissing Girls UKG	Private Room	Commercial Canada, RCA Records	Producer, engineer
2008	Edgar Winter	Rebel Road	Airline Records	Backing vocals, engineer
2009	After Midnight Project	Let's Build Something to Break	Universal Motown Records	Additional engineering
2009	Panic! at the Disco	Jennifer's Body (Music from the Motion Picture)	Fueled by Ramen, Fox Music	Backing vocals, engineer "New Perspective"
2009	Saosin	In Search of Solid Ground	Virgin Records	Engineer (tracks 2 and 10)
2009	Benevolent Tomorrow	Benevolent Tomorrow (EP)	Long Play Records	Producer, engineer, mixer
2009	Hedley	The Show Must Go	Universal Music Canada, Island Records	Engineer (tracks 4 and 9)
2010	Four Year Strong	Enemy of the World	Decaydance Records, I Surrender Records, Universal Motown	Additional mixing
2010	Foxy Shazam	Foxy Shazam	Sire Records	Backing vocals (track 5 and 7), engineer (tracks 1, 2, 4–11)
2010	VersaEmerge	Fixed at Zero	Fueled by Ramen	Engineer
2010	Intercept	Symphony for Somebody Else	Restless Music Group	Producer, mixer
2010	Beta State	Stars	Machine Shop Records	Producer, engineer, mixer, strings
2010	K.Flay	K.Flay (EP)	Self-released	Mixer
2010	Allstar Weekend	Suddenly Yours	Hollywood	Engineer
2011	Panic! at the Disco	Vices & Virtues	Decaydance, Fueled by Ramen	Engineer
2011	Culprit	Analogue (EP)	N/A	Producer, engineer, mixer
2011	Goodnight Caulfield	Taking Shape (EP)	N/A	Producer
2011	Get Scared	Best Kind of Mess	Universal Motown	Assistant engineer
2011	Allstar Weekend	All the Way	Hollywood	Engineer
2012	I the Mighty	Karma Never Sleeps (EP)	Equal Vision Records	Producer
2012	Attaloss	Attaloss	Rock Ridge Music	Producer
2012	Get Scared	Built for Blame, Laced with Shame (EP)	Grey Area Records	Producer, writer
2012	Screaming For Silence	Relentless (EP)	N/A	Producer (track 1)
2012	Set It Off	Cinematics	Equal Vision	Vocal producer, vocal engineer, programming, writer – "Swan Song", "The Grand Finale"
2012	Oh, the Irony	Within Reach	Burlingame Records	Producer, engineer, writer
2012	Motionless in White	Infamous	Fearless Records	Vocal engineer
2013	I the Mighty	Satori	Equal Vision	Producer, engineer, mixer
2013	New Years Day	Victim to Villain	Century Media Records	Producer, engineer, mixer, writer
2013	Hands Like Houses	Unimagine	Rise Records	Writer – "Developments", "Weight", "The House You Built", "Fountainhead", "Wisteria", "A Fire on a Hill"
2013	Secrets	Fragile Figures	Rise	Vocal producer, engineer, writer – "Maybe Next May"
2013	Culprit	Totem (EP)	Easy Killer Records & Apparel	Mixer, mastering
2013	Blameshift	Secrets	Executive Music Group	Bass guitar (tracks 3, 4, 6, 8, 10, 11), producer, mixer, strings
2013	Get Scared	Everyone's Out to Get Me	Fearless	Producer, engineer, mixer, writer (tracks 1, 3–12)
2014	Various	Punk Goes 90s Vol. 2	Fearless	Producer (track 1)
2014	The Word Alive	Real	Fearless	Writer (tracks 1–3, 5, 6 and 9)
2014	Sienna Skies	Seasons	InVogue Records	Writer – "Even Stronger"
2014	Heartist	Feeding Fiction	Roadrunner Records	Writer – "Pressure Point", "Manipulate"
2014	The Color Morale	Hold On Pain Ends	Fearless	Writer – "Outer Demons"
2014	Hands Like Houses	Reimagine (EP)	Rise	Producer, engineer, mixer
2014	Motionless in White	Reincarnate	Fearless	Additional production (track 6), programming (track 6), writer – "Unstoppable", "Contemptress", "Dark Passenger"
2014	Set It Off	Duality	Equal Vision, Rude Records	Writer – "Wolf in Sheep's Clothing"
2014	Too Close to Touch	Too Close to Touch (EP)	Epitaph Records	Producer, mixer, writer
2014	Taylor Swift	1989 (Deluxe)	Big Machine Records	Writer – "New Romantics"
2014	Various	Punk Goes Pop Vol. 6	Fearless	Additional vocal producer (track 8), producer, mixer (tracks 6 and 13)
2014	New Years Day	Epidemic (EP)	Grey Area	Producer, engineer, mixer, writer Owning the diseased parts of us and turning it into a strength."
2014	Picturesque	Picturesque (EP)	Equal Vision	Producer, mixer
2015	Palisades	Mind Games	Rise	Producer, engineer, writer
2015	Altessa	"Sara"	N/A	Producer
2015	Too Close to Touch	Nerve Endings	Epitaph	Producer, mixer, writer
2015	Chunk! No, Captain Chunk!	Get Lost, Find Yourself	Fearless	Writer – "Pull You Under", "What Goes Around", "Every Moment"
2015	I the Mighty	Connector	Equal Vision	Producer, mixer
2015	This Wild Life	Clouded (Atmosphere Edition)	Epitaph	Producer, engineer, writer
2015	Our Last Night	Younger Dreams	Self-released	Writer – "Imaginary Monster"
2015	Awaken the Empire	Aurora	Another Century Records	Producer, mixer
2015	Blessthefall	To Those Left Behind	Fearless	Vocal producer, vocal engineer, vocal editing, writer (tracks 1, 2, 5–7, 9–11)
2015	New Years Day	Malevolence	Another Century	Producer, engineer, mixer, writer (tracks 1–6, 8–12)
2015	Get Scared	Demons	Fearless	Producer, engineer, writer (tracks 1–4, 6–11)
2015	Myka, Relocate	The Young Souls	Artery Recordings	Writer – "Nerve", "Idle Hands"
2015	Picturesque	Monstrous Things (EP)	Equal Vision	Producer, mixer, writer – "Monstrous Things", "Just Exist", "Who We Are"
2016	Hands Like Houses	Dissonants	Rise	Co-producer, engineer, mixer, writer – "I Am", "Perspectives", "Stillwater"
2016	Rival Tides	New Rituals (EP)	Self-released	Producer, mixer
2016	Issues	Headspace	Rise	Co-producer, vocal engineer, writer (tracks 1–4, 7, 9, 11, 13)
2016	I See Stars	Treehouse	Sumerian Records	Producer (tracks 1–3, 5–8, 10–12), mixer (track 6), mastering, writer – "Calm Snow", "Everyone's Safe in the Treehouse", "Running With Scissors", "Two Hearted"
2016	The Color Morale	Desolate Divine	Fearless	Writer – "Lonesome Soul", "Version of Me", "Misery Loves Company", "Fauxtographic Memory"
2016	Sylar	Help!	Hopeless Records	Producer, engineer, mixer, writer
2016	Young Guns	Echoes	Wind-up Records	Additional programming, writer – "Careful What You Wish For", "Awakening"
2016	Too Close to Touch	Haven't Been Myself	Epitaph	Producer, mixer, writer (tracks 1–7, 9–11)
2016	Dayshell	Nexus	Spinefarm Records	Producer, engineer, mixer, writer – "A New Man"
2016	Set It Off	Upside Down	Equal Vision, Rude	Instrumentation, producer, mixer, programming, writer – "Uncontainable", "Want", "Admit It", "Never Know", "Me w/o Us"
2016	I Prevail	Lifelines	Fearless	Writer – "Chaos", "Worst Part of Me"
2016	Attila	Chaos	SharpTone Records	Producer, mixer, writer (tracks 1–9), lyrics
2016	badXchannels	WHYDFML EP	SharpTone	Producer, engineer, mixer, writer
2017	Palisades	Palisades	Rise	Producer
2017	Altessa	Demo EP	N/A	Producer, engineer, mixer (track 1)
2017	Picturesque	Back to Beautiful	Equal Vision	Producer, mixer
2017	The Color Wild	Clean (EP)	N/A	Producer, writer – "Brighter than the Moon"
2017	Too Close to Touch	"Leave You Lonely"	Epitaph	Producer, writer
2017	nothing,nowhere.	Reaper	DCD2 Records	Producer, mixer, programming, writer
2017	Like Moths to Flames	Dark Divine	Rise	Producer, engineer, writer
2017	Too Close to Touch	"Before I Cave In"	Epitaph	
2018	Too Close to Touch	"Burn"	Epitaph	Writer
2018	Slaves	Beautiful Death	SGB Records	Producer, mixer, writer
2018	Nerv	Bad Habits (EP)	Self-released	Producer (track 1)
2018	badXchannels	"Memory"	N/A	Producer, writer
2018	nothing,nowhere.	Ruiner	Fueled by Ramen	Producer, mixer (track 8)
2018	Godsmack	When Legends Rise	BMG	Producer, mixer, writer – "Bulletproof", "Take It to the Edge", "Eye of the Storm"
2018	Dance Gavin Dance	Artificial Selection	Rise	Backing vocals, vocal producer (tracks 1 & 2), mixer (track 2)>
2018	Ghost Town	In the Flesh (EP)	N/A	Producer
2018	Colorblind	"Parting Words"	N/A	Producer
2018	Tilian	The Skeptic	Future Friends, Rise	Producer "Right Side"
2018	Sylar	Seasons	Hopeless	Producer, engineer, mixer, mastering, writer (tracks 1–10)
2018	Hands Like Houses	Anon	UNFD, Hopeless	Producer, writer – "Tilt"
2018	Various	Songs That Saved My Life	Hopeless, Sub City Records	Producer (track 4), engineer
2018	Vigils	Spinning (EP)	N/A	Producer, engineer, mixer
2018	Karise Eden	Born to Fight	Island, Universal Music	Writer – "Ain’t Thinkin About You"
2019	Too Close to Touch	I'm Hard to Love, But So Are You, Vol. 1 (EP)	Epitaph	Producer (track 3), mixer (track 3), writer – "The Fear of Letting Go"
2019	Reece	I'm Not Sure Yet (EP)	Snafu Records	Producer, writer – "Patience"
2019	Set It Off	Midnight	Fearless	Writer – "Go to Bed Angry"
2019	Tyler Carter	Moonshine	Rise	Backing vocals (track 1), vocal producer (track 1), writer – "Moonshine", "Focus", "Glow"
2019	nothing,nowhere.	"Call Back"	Fueled by Ramen	Producer
2019	I Prevail	Trauma	Fearless	Writer – "Every Time You Leave", "Let Me Be Sad", "Deadweight"
2019	Motionless in White	Disguise	Roadrunner	Writer – "Legacy"
2019	Dante Klein & Greff	"Don’t Know Shit"	Spinnin' Records, Source Records	Writer
2019	guccihighwaters	"Amnesia"	N/A	Producer
2019	Too Close to Touch	I'm Hard to Love, But So Are You, Vol. 2 (EP)	Epitaph	Producer, mixer, writer – "F.I.N.E."
2019	Through Fire	All Animal	Sumerian	Writer – "If You Love Me, Leave Me"
2019	CrypticRarity	Riots of Renegades (EP)	New West Records	Producer
2019	Issues	Beautiful Oblivion	Rise	Programming, writer – "Tapping Out"
2019	Narrative	"No Color in Sight"	Self-released	Producer
2019	Thousand Below	Gone In Your Wake	Rise	Producer, engineer, writer – "Chemical"
2019	Fire from the Gods	American Sun	Eleven Seven	Backing vocals, guitar, producer, engineer, mixer, writer (tracks 1, 2, 4–8, 10, 12)
2019	Too Close to Touch	I'm Hard to Love, But So Are You, Vol. 3 (EP)	Epitaph	Producer
2019	UVERworld	Unser	Gr8! Records	Writer – "Oxymoron"
2020	Survive Said the Prophet	Inside Your Head	Sony Music Records	Mixer, writer – "Last Dance Lullaby"
2020	Bad Omens	Finding God Before God Finds Me (Deluxe)	Sumerian	Writer – "Limits"
2020	Clint Lowery	God Bless the Renegades	Rise	Writer – "Allowed to Run"
2020	The Word Alive	Monomania	Fearless	Bass guitar, producer, engineer, mixer, writer (tracks 2–11)
2020	Wake Me	"You'll Hate Me"	N/A	Producer, writer
2020	Johnny Craig	Find Your Home (EP)	SGB	Producer, writer – "Block Out The Noise", "Forelsket (Euphoria)"
2020	Wake Me	"Blood Moon"	N/A	Producer, writer
2020	Dead Lakes	New Language (EP)	SharpTone	Producer (track 3)
2020	Bush	The Kingdom	BMG	Producer (1 and 2), engineer, mixer (tracks 1, 2 and 4)
2020	Designer Disguise	Nowhere (EP)	Self-released	Producer
2020	From Ashes to New	Panic	Better Noise Music	Producer, mixer, writer – "Panic", "Wait for Me"
2020	Colorblind	"Stay"	N/A	Writer
2020	Wake Me	"Night Games"	N/A	Producer, writer
2020	lil aaron	808 Rock (EP)	Hazheart Records	Producer, writer – "Vans Untied"
2020	Saul	Rise as Equals	Spinefarm	Guitar, programming, writer – "Here and Now"
2021	Zero 9:36	...If You Don’t Save Yourself (EP)	ATCO Records, Atlantic Records, Prim8 Music, Warner Music Group	Producer, writer – "Take Me Instead"
2021	Diamante	American Dream	Anti-Heroine	Additional production, writer – "Wake Up Call"
2021	Osatia	"When Will I Learn"	N/A	Producer
2021	Pop Evil	Versatile	eOne Music	Writer, lyrics – "Set Me Free"
2021	Quinton Griggs	"Chaos!"	Demon Boy, LLC.	Producer, writer
2021	INAU, Karim & Sunsleep	"New Sensation"	Loud Memory	Producer
2021	Various	Falling into Your Smile Official Television Soundtrack	NSMG	Producer, writer, lyrics – "Everytime"
2021	ELKIE	"Gave My Heart Away"	NSMG	Writer
2021	From Ashes to New	Quarantine Chronicles, Vol. 1 (EP)	Better Noise	Producer, writer – "Enough"
2021	From Ashes to New	Quarantine Chronicles, Vol. 2 (EP)	Better Noise	Producer, writer – "Light Up the Sky"
2021	Grayscale	Umbra	Fearless	Writer – "Over Now"
2021	Pentakill	III: Lost Chapter	Riot Games	Engineer (tracks 4 and 5)
2021	From Ashes to New	Quarantine Chronicles, Vol. 3 (EP)	Better Noise	Producer (tracks 1 and 3), writer – "Wait for Me"
2021	Starset	Horizons	Fearless	Writer – "Alchemy"
2021	The Word Alive	"Wonderland"	N/A	Producer, writer
2021	Black Veil Brides	The Phantom Tomorrow	Sumerian	Producer, engineer, mixer, writer (tracks 2–4, 6–12)
2022	Bad Omens	The Death of Peace of Mind	Sumerian	Producer, writer – "Take Me First"
2022	Islander	It's Not Easy Being Human	Better Noise	Producer (track 9)
2022	Motionless in White	Scoring the End of the World	Roadrunner	Writer – "Masterpiece"
2022	Destroy Rebuild Until God Shows	Destroy Rebuild	Velocity Records, Equal Vision	Writer – "Outcasts vs Everyone"
2022	The Faim	Talk Talk	BMG	Producer (track 10)
2022	Rain City Drive	Rain City Drive	Thriller Records	Co-producer, writer (tracks 1–3, 7–10)
2022	Huddy	"All the Things I Hate About You"	Half Blood Records	Producer
2022	Chad Tepper	Never Stood A Chance	Epitaph	Producer, writer – "1-800-IDONTKNOWYOUANYMORE"
2022	Hollywood Undead	Hotel Kalifornia	BMG, Dove & Grenade Media	Co-producer, writer (tracks 6–8, 12, 15–18)
2022	I Prevail	True Power	Fearless	Writer – "Closure"
2022	Bush	The Art of Survival	BMG	Backing vocals, guitar, producer, engineer, mixer, writer – "More Than Machines", "All Things Must Change"
2022	Kat Leigh	Kat Leigh (EP)	BMG	Guitar, drums, producer, engineer, programming, writer – "U Know Where to Find Me"
2022	44phantom	"hurricane"	Columbia Records	Producer, writer
2022	Black Veil Brides	The Mourning (EP)	Sumerian	Producer, writer
2022	Fire from the Gods	Soul Revolution	Better Noise	Producer, engineer, mixer, writer (tracks 2, 4–7, 9, 12)
2022	Kailee Morgue	Girl Next Door	Thriller	Producer, writer – "Falling From the Sky"
2022	nobody likes you pat	imago	my dreams are dead, LLC.	Producer, engineer, writer – "maybe money"
2023	Godsmack	Lighting Up the Sky	BMG	Writer – "Surrender"
2023	Papa Roach	Ego Trip (Deluxe)	New Noize Records	Producer, writer – "Spotlight"
2023	Ellise	"brokenboys&bitterbitches"	N/A	Producer, mixer, writer – "Black Balloons"
2023	nothing,nowhere.	Void Eternal	Fueled by Ramen	Producer, mixer, writer – "VEN0M"
2023	93FEETOFSMOKE	ALTAR74	Photo Finish Records	Producer (tracks 3 and 4), mixer (track 3), writer – "conversations", "chewing on my tongue"
2023	Jutes	Ladybug	N/A	Producer, writer – "Do It To Myself"
2023	Honey Revenge	Retrovision	Thriller	Producer (track 2)
2023	Hot Milk	A Call to the Void	Music for Nations	Writer, lyrics – "OVER YOUR DEAD BODY"
2023	The Word Alive	Hard Reset	Thriller	Co-producer, writer – "Slow Burn", "A New Empty"
2023	Conquer Divide	Slow Burn	Mascot Records	Writer – "Wide Awake"
2023	Velvet Chains	"Stuck Against the Wall"	N/A	Producer
2023	Staind	Confessions of the Fallen	BMG	Producer, engineer, mixer, writer
2023	Ellise	Over Her Dead Body (EP)	N/A	Producer, writer – "Half a Heart", "Killer"
2023	Until I Wake	Inside My Head (Deluxe Edition)	Fearless	Co-producer, engineer, writer – "Cold", "Fool’s Paradise"
2023	Neoni	"KNIVES"	ELEV8MUSIC	Producer, writer
2023	Lilyisthatyou	POP MUSIC (EP)	Self-released	Producer, writer – "SIREN"
2023	Ellise	"She Ruins Everything"	N/A	Producer, writer
2024	Connor Kauffman	Two Hearts (EP)	Sounds Good	Producer, writer – "Far Too Late"
2024	david hugø	If I Could Read Minds (EP)	Self-released	Writer – "Sleepyhead"
2024	Too Close to Touch	For Keeps	Epitaph	Backing vocals (track 3), bass guitar (tracks 2, 3, 6, 8), producer (tracks 1, 2, 4–6, 8), mixer (tracks 2, 4–6, 8), writer – "Disappear", "Hopeless", "Heavy Hearts", "Control", "They Don't Even Know"
2024	Sophie Cates	SUPERNOVA	Independent	Writer – "maybe she was the one"
2024	Lilyisthatyou	"DIRTY LITTLE FANTASY"	Self-released	Producer, writer
2024	Stela Cole	"Feel It Again"	Stelavision Records	Producer, writer
2024	Chandler Leighton	Proof You Weren’t the Only One	Boom.Records	Producer, writer – "Fixer Upper"
2024	Keith Wallen	Infinity Now	Rise	Writer – "Nemesis"
2024	Various	Hopelessly Devoted To You: 30th Anniversary	Hopeless	Producer (track 13)
2024	Black Veil Brides	Bleeders (EP)	Spinefarm	Producer, writer – "Bleeders"
2024	jxdn	When the Music Stops	DTA Records, Elektra Records	Writer – "SH!T"
2024	The Home Team	The Crucible of Life	Thriller	Writer – "Honest", "Love When You're Used"
2024	Sarina	"Living in the Moment"	SyrenSong	Producer, writer
2024	Emblem3	"Looks to Kill"	Break Records	Producer, writer
2024	Fame on Fire	The Death Card	Hopeless	Producer, writer
2024	Zero 9:36	None of Us Are Getting Out (EP)	Self-released, ONErpm	Producer, writer – "Chasing Shadows"
2024	Loveless	Loveless II	Rise	Guitar, producer, engineer, mixer, writer
2024	Ashley Sienna	EDEN	Self-released	Producer, writer – "Temptation"
