= Cinematics (album) =

Studio album by Set It Off
- Released: September 18, 2012
- Studio: Vintage Song Studios, Atlanta
- Genre: Pop-punk; symphonic rock
- Length: 38:49
- Label: Equal Vision
- Producer: Zack Odom; Kenneth Mount

Set It Off chronology
| Cinematics (2012) | Duality (2014) |

Expanded edition cover

Singles from Cinematics
- 1. "I'll Sleep When I'm Dead" Released: 26 June 2012; 2. "Swan Song" Released: 28 August 2012; 3. "Partners In Crime" Released: 19 June 2013

Professional ratings
Review scores
| Source | Rating |
|---|---|
| Sputnikmusic | 4/5 |

Cinematics is the debut studio album by American rock band Set It Off. The album was released on September 18, 2012, by record label Equal Vision Records.

The song "Partners In Crime" was certified Gold by the RIAA, indicating equivalent sales of 500,000 copies in the United States, on March 6, 2023.

== Writing and recording ==
The band enter the studio in February to begin recording their debut album with producers Zack Odom and Kenneth Mount. All the tracks were written by Cody Carson, taking inspiration from his and his bandmates personal life experiences.

== Promotion and release ==
=== Original release ===
The band release the first single of the album,"I'll Sleep When I'm Dead", on June 26, 2012, along with a lyric video. The second single, "Swan Song", was released on August 28, with a lyric video. A music video for the song was released on October 29. The music video was published to the band's official YouTube channel on November 8.

=== Reissue/Expanded edition ===
The band announced a reissue of the album on April 23, 2013, set to release on June 25. They released a lyric video for the song "Kill the Lights" on May 31, without releasing it as a single. The first and only single of the reissue and third single of the album, "Partners In Crime", was released on June 19, with a music video being released the next day.

== Track listing ==
All tracks are produced by Zack Odom and Kenneth Mount

All tracks are written by Cody Carson.

"Cinematics" track listing
| No. | Title | Music | Length |
|---|---|---|---|
| 1. | "Thoughts That Breathe" | | 0:27 |
| 2. | "Nightmare" | | 3:21 |
| 3. | "Swan Song" | Set It Off; Erik Ron | 3:58 |
| 4. | "Plastic Promises" | | 3:17 |
| 5. | "I'll Sleep When I'm Dead" | | 3:22 |
| 6. | "No Control" | | 3:25 |
| 7. | "Dream Catcher" | | 3:59 |
| 8. | "Freak Show" | Set It Off; Bob Marlette; Shilloh Schramm; Daniel Ticotin | 2:53 |
| 9. | "Distance Disturbs Me" | Set It Off; Stacy Jones | 3:07 |
| 10. | "Dad's Song" | | 3:51 |
| 11. | "I'd Rather Drown" | | 3:23 |
| 12. | "The Grand Finale" | Set It Off; Ron | 3:46 |
| Total length: | | | 38:49 |

Deluxe version bonus tracks
| No. | Title | Length |
|---|---|---|
| 1. | "You Are Loved (Demo)" | 3:20 |
| 2. | "Swan Song (Acoustic Version)" | 3:55 |
| 3. | "I'll Sleep When I'm Dead (Acoustic Version)" | 3:24 |
| Total length: | | 49:28 |

Expanded Edition bonus tracks
| No. | Title | Length |
|---|---|---|
| 1. | "Partners In Crime" (featuring Ash Costello) | 3:31 |
| 2. | "Kill the Lights" | 2:48 |
| 3. | "Dream Catcher (Acoustic)" | 4:34 |
| 4. | "I'll Sleep When I'm Dead (Mira Remix)" | 5:02 |
| Total length: | | 54:44 |

== Personnel ==
Credits adapted from Allmusic.

Set It Off

- Cody Carson – Vocals, Clarinet, Composer
- Zach Dewall – Guitar, Composer
- Maxx Danziger – Drums, Percussion, Composer
- Dan Clermont – Guitar, Trumpet, Backing Vocals, Composer
- Austin Kerr – Bass, Composer

Additional Composers

- Bob Marlette
- Daniel Ticotin
- Erik Ron
- Shiloh Shcaramm
- Stacy Jones

Guest Vocals

- Ashley Costello

Production

- Kenneth Mouth – Producer, Engineer, Mixing
- Zack Odom – Producer, Engineer, Mixing
- Michael Fossenkemper – Mastering

Other

- Gabe Young – Photography
- Evan Lake – Art direction, Design
- Mike Mowery – Management
- Ryan Soroka – Booking
- Francesa Caldara – A&R

== Charts ==
| Chart (2012) | Peak position |
|---|---|
| US Billboard 200 | 174 |
| US Top Album Sales (Billboard) | 174 |
| US Independent Albums (Billboard) | 38 |
| US Heatseekers Albums (Billboard) | 4 |
