= Calisus =

American rock band

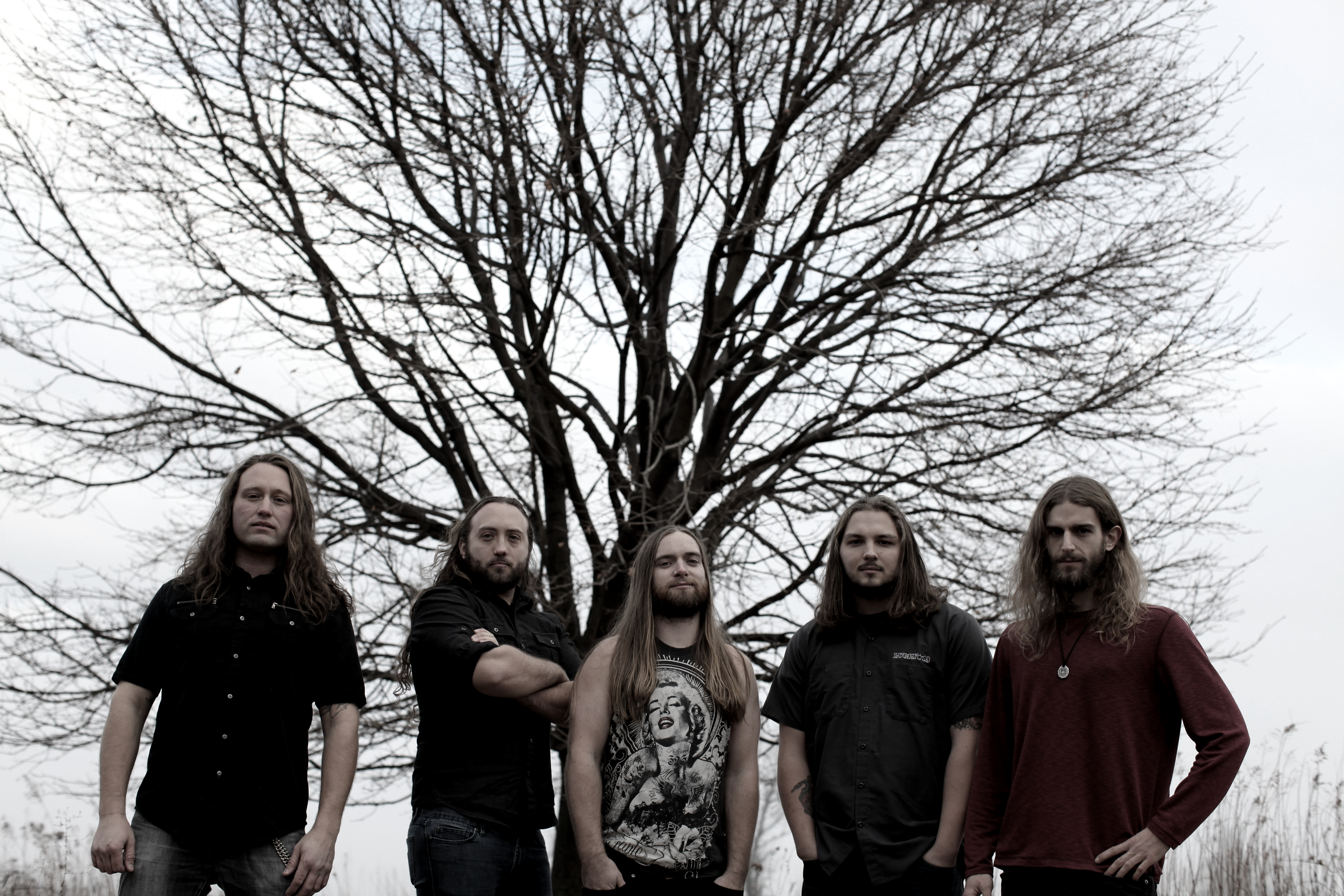
Calisus in 2016

Calisus (pronounced kha-lee-sus) is a six piece American rock band from Hagerstown, Maryland. Their worldwide releases include Skeleton Key (2012) and Human (2016) which are both EP's. The band currently consists of Zach Constable (Lead Vocals), Patrick Koch (Guitar/Backing Vocals), George Koch (Guitar/Backing Vocals), Matthew Alsop (Drums/Backing Vocals), David Shrader (bass), and Chris Nyack (Synth/Keys/Backing Vocals). Similar artists include Shinedown, Foo Fighters, Stone Temple Pilots, Linkin Park, Alter Bridge, Seether, and Nickelback. Other artists referenced in similarity are Three Days Grace and Alice In Chains.

== History ==
Calisus is a band that came to establish itself in Active Rock in 2009 when they reincarnated a previous band that was more pop/alternative rock. They wrote and recorded various rock tracks while independently booking a full tour. The band hit venues up and down the East Coast and Midwest of the US playing mostly originals as they tried to find what their footing and identity was going to be in the rock scene. The dates included stops in MD, VA, WV, PA, OH, NY, NC, SC, GA, and TN. Before this, the band had previously done a west coast tour up and down California, Washington State, and Portland, OR while rounding out a sound, including stops at North Beach Fest and the legendary Boom Boom Room in San Francisco.

== Releases ==
Calisus has two Official Worldwide multi-track releases. The first one titled Skeleton Key is an EP produced by Casey Sabol (formerly lead singer of Grammy nominated metal band Periphery), current singer and producer of New Guns of the Old West.

The second worldwide release is the 2016 EP titled Human. This ten song "Deluxe" EP featured nine new recordings plus one radio edit.

On February 1, 2018, Calisus released their new single "Now or Never" which debuted on 101.5 Bob Rocks FM (WBHB).

=== Skeleton Key (2012) ===
Unhappy with their completed 2011 LP (recorded in 2010) The Disposition, the band decided to scrap the entire $20k self funded recording; opting to write and record new material. The band took a trip to Memphis, TN for inspiration. In Memphis, they spent a lot of time with their friend and fellow musician Jason Hughes (from the charting band Dust For Life), member of the critically acclaimed Driving Into Eternity at that time. Rejuvenated with new tracks and a more focused musical direction, the band hired long time friend Justin Gosnell of Vestascension to engineer. It was shortly after which they decided to hire mutual friend Casey Sabol to produce the EP.

Mixed and Mastered by the commercially successful Brandon Paddock, the EP featured 6 songs marking a broad approach to modern rock, featuring two anthems, two ballads, and two heavy hitters. Post release included a music video for the title track, supporting show dates, and distribution of over 6,000 copies independently with no label support. The band garnered regional acclaim and consistent radio play of the singles Skeleton Key and Feeding the Strain from the likes of WBHB 101.5FM (Bob Rocks), WQCM 94.3FM and Jango Radio, Extreme Metal Works of the singles Better Part of Me and Dirt; as well as various other online and terrestrial radio stations (commercial and non-commercial) spinning the title track.

After the release of Skeleton Key, Matthew Alsop (aka Maat Himself) joined the band as a bassist after his sabbatical in Germany so that Zach could be more mobile during live performances. About six months later, they parted ways with their drummer and Maat took his place as the official drummer.

=== Human (2016) ===
In mid 2015, with Zach back on bass duties and Maat on the drums, Calisus announced they started the writing and recording process for their yet to be named EP between playing shows with bands like Hoobastank and Saving Abel. It was decided that co-founder/guitarist Patrick Koch was going to produce the record and they began drum sessions at The Acid Lab in Frederick, MD. Upon completion of the drum tracks, recording was moved to Hybrid Soundscape Studios (Patrick's studio) in Hagerstown, MD for the remaining sessions.

After updates of guitar and bass sessions (with Patrick, George Koch, & Zach Constable sharing engineering duties) via the band's Facebook page, they took a break from the studio and welcomed David Shrader to the band as their bassist so that Zach could be more mobile during live performances. It was during this time that the band worked on another new track to and booked a busy performance schedule.

It was announced in the summer of 2016 that the album was completed and would be released regionally in August 2016 and a worldwide release would follow in 2017.

=== Now or Never - Single (2018) ===
On February 1, 2018, Calisus debuted their new single "Now or Never" on 101.5 Bob Rocks FM (WBHB) with on air personality "Crazy Bob" with a sixth member present. It was also noted on their Facebook the addition of Chris Nyack as their keyboardist/synth player. According to the notes in the description of the Official Lyric Video, the track was written and composed by Calisus & Rob Figarola, Produced by Patrick Koch, and recorded at Patrick's studio Hybrid Soundscape Studios.

"Now or Never" was picked up in late February by Rock Rage Radio as well as 101.5 Bob Rocks FM for rotation.

== Music video ==
In 2012, Calisus shot and release an official music video for the title track Skeleton Key, coinciding with the EP's release. The video was directed by Christopher Poloni. Shot in the Hotel of Horror of Saylorsburg, PA (one of the locations of the film Six Degrees of Hell, starring Corey Feldman).

== Radio ==
In 2018 with the push of their single "Now or Never", the band posted on their website they have been receiving radio play on multiple formats of internet and terrestrial radio. In addition, "Now or Never" reached #1 on the Top 20 of 365 Radio Network, a radio company based out of Ohio which owns 17 stations (13 of which can be streamed via TuneIn).

Further independent success on radio for "Now or Never" as listed by the band on their website and social media include interviews on the MARR Rock Show and The Scene podcast, rotation on 104.7 KISS FM and Boston Rock Radio, as well as charting on indie stations around the world; such as Big Indie Giant where the single reached #1 in South Africa.

== Industry Significance ==
Rob Figarola (A&R of The Weeknd, Imagine Dragons, Mackelmore), posted on his YouTube page a recommendation video made by Patrick and Maat of Calisus where they announce they have been working together developing the band. This video was published after the release of the Human EP and prior to the release of the single Now or Never.

== Influences ==
The band has posted on Facebook and spoken in interviews streamed live on Facebook regarding their musical influences from more modern rock artists such as Stone Temple Pilots, Smashing Pumpkins, Foo Fighters, and Shinedown, as well as classic artists such as Dio, Def Leppard, and Bad Company. The band states in a video description on their YouTube that the Eagles and Glenn Frey are a big influence not only from a musical perspective, but a business perspective as well.

== Charitable efforts ==
Photos and events posted on the internet have shown the band to be consistently active in charitable contributions of their time and performances. Some of these charities include Blue Star Moms, Hep B awareness, Heroin rehabilitation, Helping Little Hands (Penn State Children's Hospital), Wounded Warriors, Cruisin' for a Cure (breast cancer), Gettysburg Rocks (Four Diamonds Childhood Cancer), and more. This also includes raising money locally with other bands for good causes, such as helping clean up the Potomac River, part of which runs through their area.
