= Set It Off (band) =

American rock band

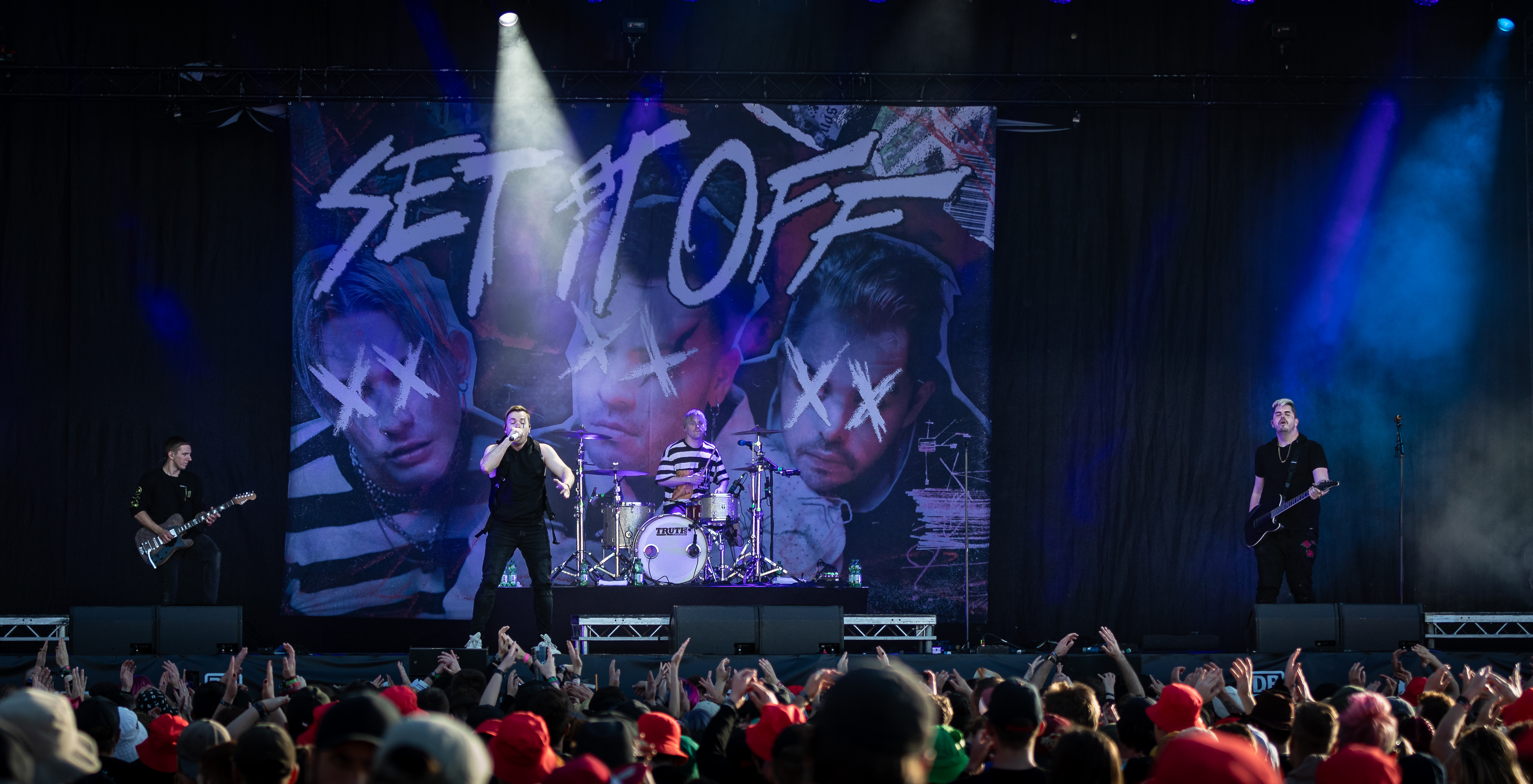
- Set It Off performing at Rock am Ring 2023 in Germany

Background information
- Origin: Tampa, Florida, U.S.
- Genres: Alternative rock; nu metal; rap rock; alternative metal; pop-punk; pop rock
- Years active: 2008–present
- Labels: Fearless; Equal Vision; Rude
- Members: Cody Carson; Maxx Danziger; Zach DeWall
- Past members: Blake Howell; Benji Panico; Dan Clermont; Austin Kerr; James Arran
- Website: setitoffband.com

Set It Off is an American rock band formed in 2008 in Tampa, Florida. The band consists of lead vocalist Cody Carson, guitarist and bassist Zach DeWall, and drummer Maxx Danziger.

The band initially gained a large following through singer Cody Carson's YouTube channel. Set It Off was signed by Equal Vision Records after releasing a string of successful extended-play albums. In 2018, they signed with Fearless Records, which in February 2019 released Midnight, their fourth studio album. In 2022, after they released their fifth studio album Elsewhere, in 2023, they announced that they had left Fearless Records and gone independent. They released their self-titled sixth studio album in November 2025.

== History ==
=== Formation (2008) ===
Cody Carson and Dan Clermont, who met in their high school marching band, formed a band, which brushed against another band created by Austin M. Kerr and Zach DeWall while playing local shows. After high school, Carson left for Ohio to attend the Oberlin Conservatory of Music as a classical clarinet student. In his first year, after exchanging a series of YouTube videos with All Time Low frontman Alex Gaskarth, Carson asked to sing "Coffee Shop Soundtrack" at the group's upcoming concert at the Cleveland House of Blues via a YouTube video. The performance led Carson to drop out of college and use his school money to start up the band.

Dewall and Kerr were among the first to join; Dan Clermont followed as the band's lead guitar player. James Arran was Set It Off's first drummer, but financial struggles made gas purchases difficult for him, and he resigned August 24, 2008. He was succeeded by Blake Howell, who soon left the band due to family difficulties. Howell was replaced by Benji Panico on October 30, 2009; he left to pursue his GED and, later, start his own photography studio. Howell introduced the band to their current drummer, Maxx Danziger.

=== Early releases (2008–2010) ===
- Released their first EP: Baby, You Don't Tripajaharda, on October 31, 2008.
- Self-released their EP: Calm Before the Storm on May 16, 2009.
- Self-released the single "Hush Hush" on September 6, 2010. A music video was made to accompany the song on October 4, 2010.
- Released the single "Together Forever" on November 16, 2010.
- Released the single "@Reply" on December 25, 2010. A music video was later made to accompany the song.
- Self-released their EP: Horrible Kids, which included "@Reply".

=== Horrible Kids (2011–2012) ===
In July 2011, the band announced its signing to Equal Vision Records and that the label would issue a remastered version of its self-released EP Horrible Kids, along with the single "Chase It!" on August 30, 2011.

Carson said, "Our main inspiration in writing this album was derived from personal experiences growing up. I loved being able to turn to songs that I could personally relate to. I want to provide that same kind of coping source for people. I want people to be able to turn on Horrible Kids and pick a song that pinpoints exactly what they're going through and allows them to vent through it."

The album debuted in the top 100 Alternative Albums on iTunes. Horrible Kids was recorded at Red Sparrow Studios in Wilson, North Carolina. It was produced, engineered, and mixed by Brandon Ham and John Harrell.

=== Cinematics (2012–2013) ===
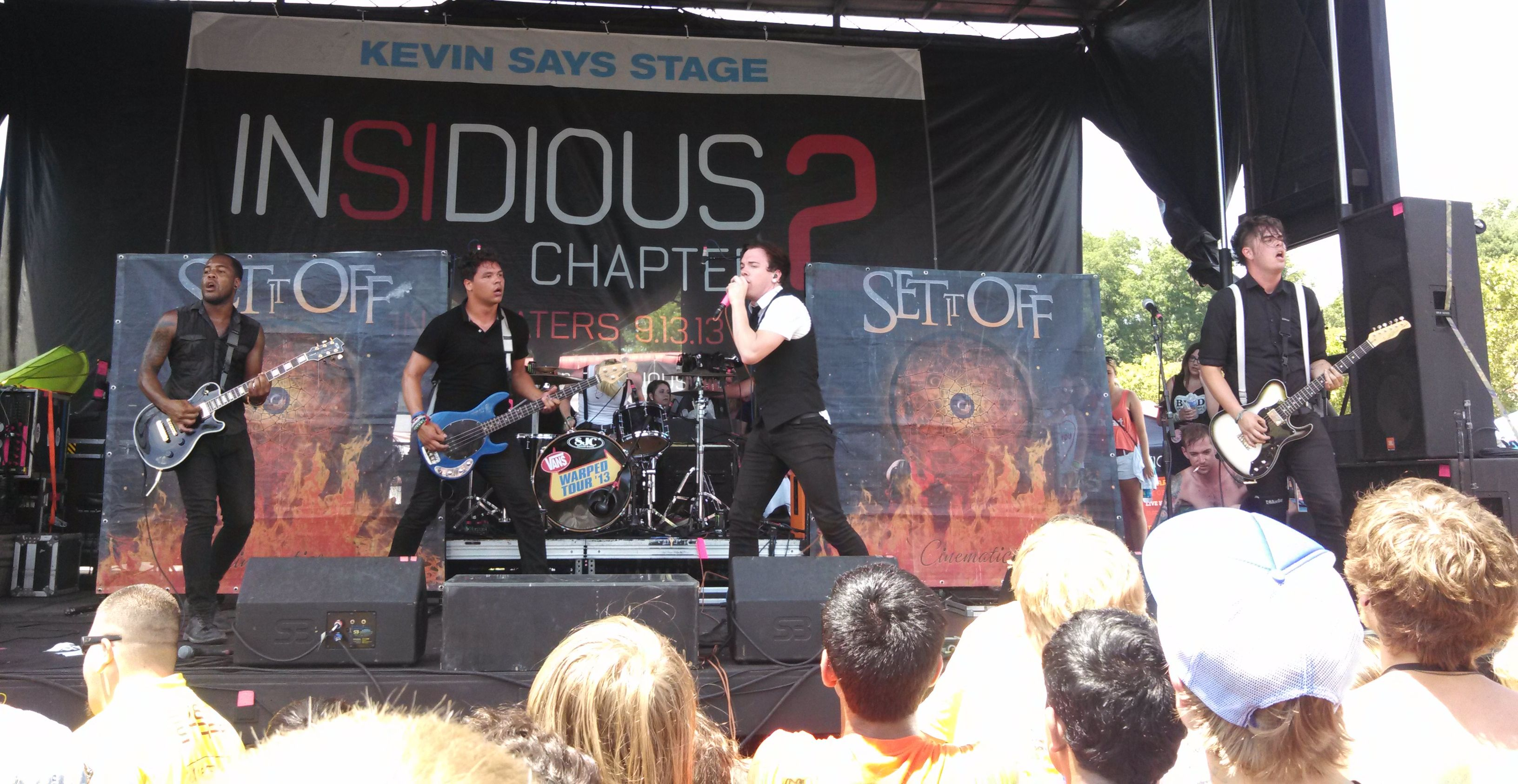
Band performing (2013) at Warped Tour

In July 2012, Set It Off announced the upcoming release of its debut full-length album Cinematics, On September 18, 2012. A deluxe version was released the same day exclusively on iTunes.

Through the VH1 Save the Music Foundation, the band donated $1 for every album sold before September 23 to support music programs in schools. The band also donated their bonus, generating a total donation of $5,000. Equal Vision Records agreed to match the band's donation if the band reached No. 1 on the Billboard Heatseekers Chart. Cody Carson said, "We're honored to be working with VH1 Save the Music. If it wasn't for the music education program in my high school, Set It Off would not exist. I would not have met our guitarist, Dan Clermont, I wouldn't have been directed toward Oberlin Music Conservatory, and I wouldn't end up with even half of the musical knowledge I possess now. More people need to be able to experience the unity, leadership skills, and work ethic taught by being involved in music education programs in schools. Set It Off strongly endorses this organization for these, among many other, reasons. We're so excited to raise money for them and help spread the word about the importance of music education."

The album, which was produced, mixed, and recorded by Zack Odom and Kenneth Mount at ZK Productions, debuted at No. 174 on the Billboard 200, No. 4 on the Top Heatseekers, and No. 38 on the Independent Albums chart.

The band released an expanded edition of the album with a new cover on June 25, 2013. In October, Fearless Records released the album Punk Goes Christmas, which featured an original Set It Off song, "This Christmas (I'll Burn It to the Ground)."

=== Duality and Kerr's departure (2014–2016) ===
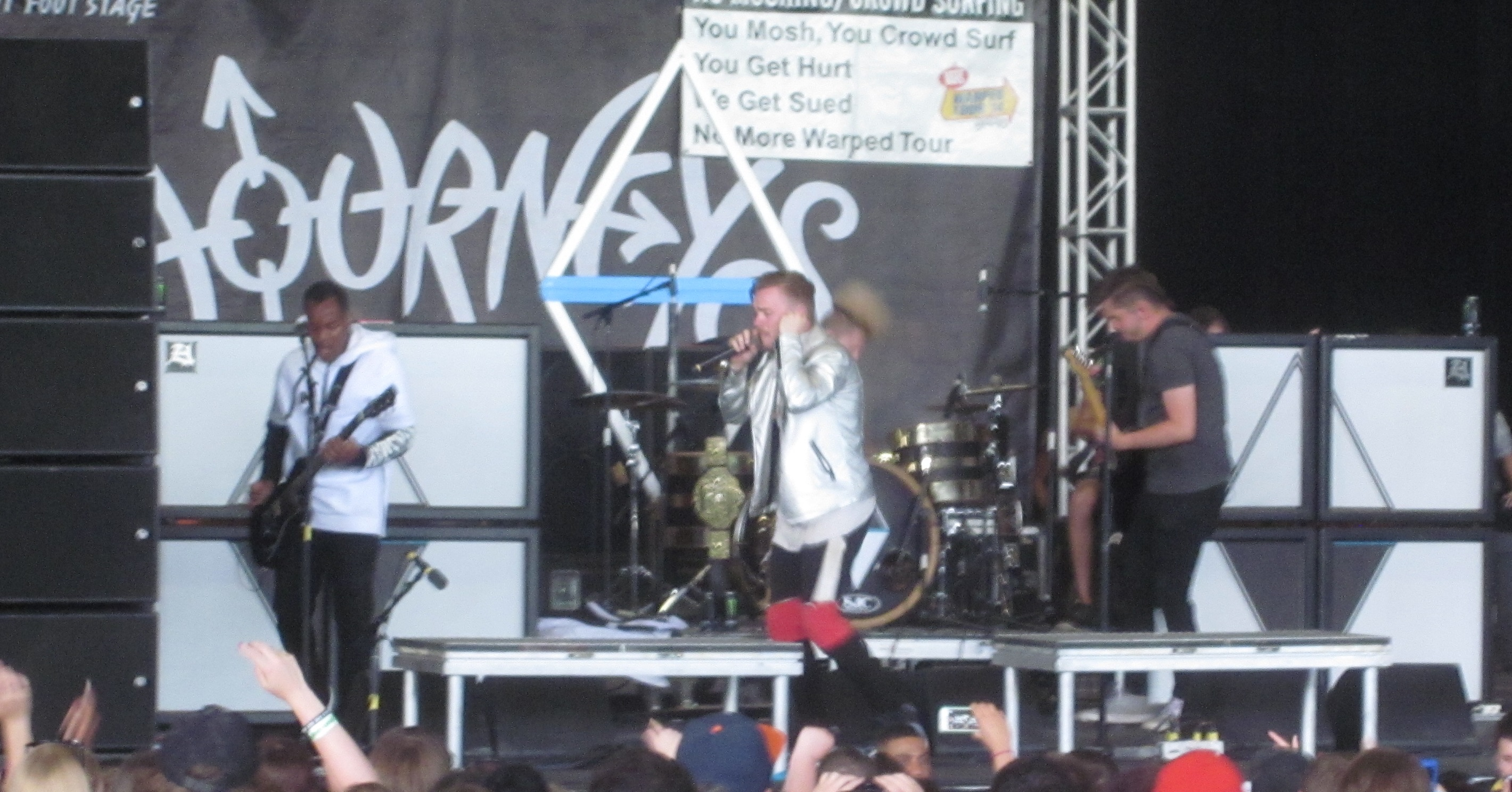
Set It Off performing in 2015 at Warped Tour in Connecticut

At the start of the year 2014, Equal Vision Records announced via YouTube that Set It Off would record an album with John Feldmann, which would be released on October 14. The band recorded the album in Los Angeles with several producers, including Brandon Paddock, Tommy English, and Matt Appleton. A music video for "Why Worry" was filmed at St. Mark's Church in-the-Bowery in Manhattan on August 21, using fans as extras. That August, it was announced that the band would be supporting Black Veil Brides on their headline Black Mass Tour through October and November, joining Falling in Reverse and Drama Club. The first single off the album was released on September 9. The album was included at number 5 on Rock Sound's "Top 50 Albums of the Year" list. The release of the album led to several music videos which, in order of release, are: "Tomorrow", "Ancient History", "Forever Stuck In Our Youth", "The Haunting", and the title track "Duality".

2014 also saw Set It Off featured on Fearless Records' Punk Goes Pop 6, on which the band covered Ariana Grande's "Problem".

The band announced in February 2015 that they would be playing at the Vans Warped Tour '15 on the Journeys shoe stage. In May, Set It Off announced that Austin Kerr would no longer be a part of the band following sexual assault claims. Kerr subsequently went on to pursue a solo hip hop career. One month later, Set It Off released their fourth EP Duality: Stories Unplugged, which contains 5 acoustic renditions of songs from Duality and one original song titled "Wild, Wild World".

Fearless Records released the album Punk Goes Christmas: Deluxe Edition in November 2015, still featuring Set It Off's original song "This Christmas (I'll Burn It to the Ground)".

The band announced in March 2016 that they would be playing at the Vans Warped Tour for the second year in a row, this time on the main stage.

=== Upside Down (2016–2017) ===
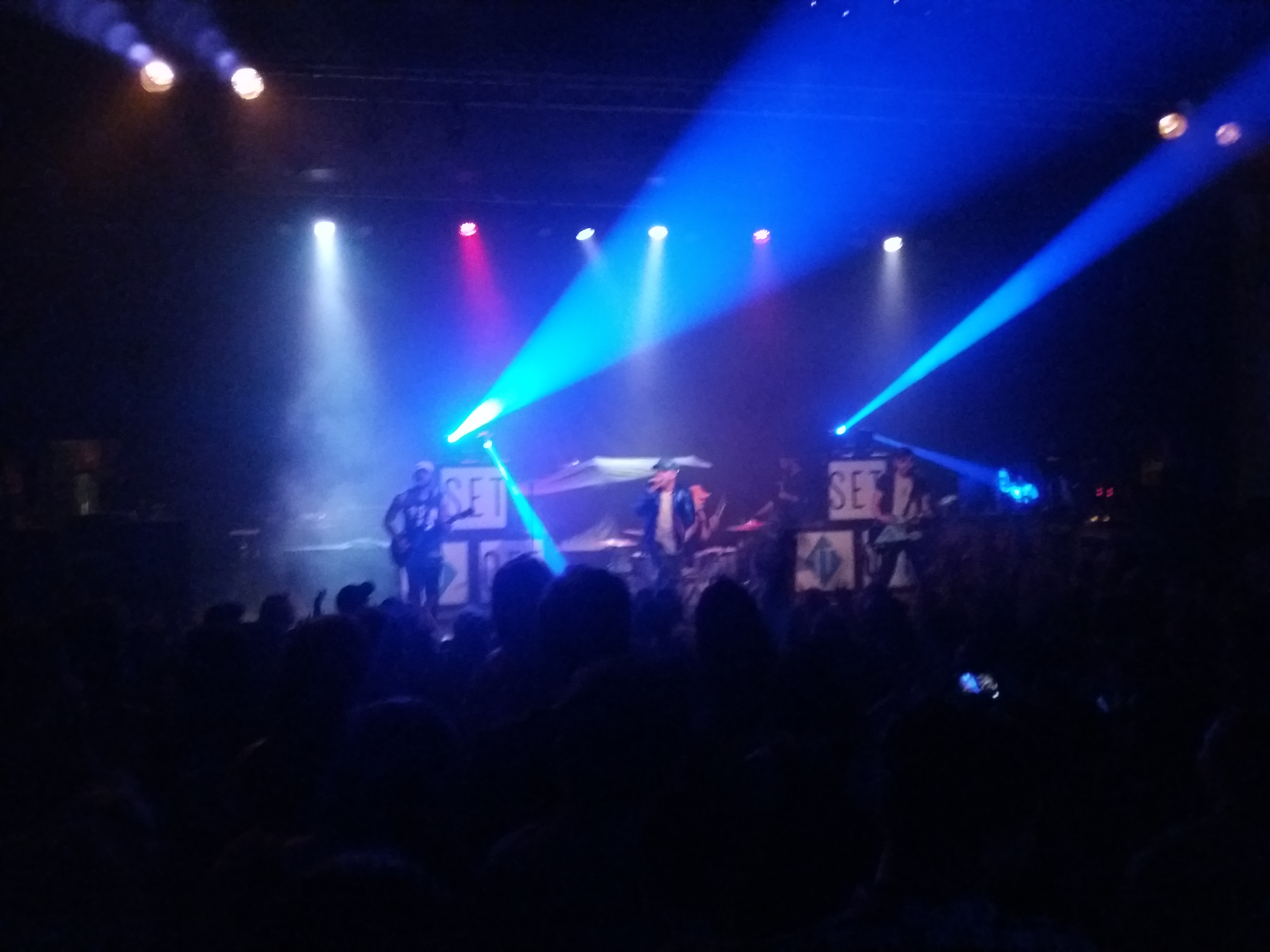
Set it Off playing live in 2017.

The band released its album Upside Down on October 7, 2016. It doubled Duality's first-week sales.

Additionally, the band released both music and lyric videos for their song "Life Afraid."

=== Signing to Fearless Records, Midnight and Dan's departure (2018–2021) ===
In 2018, Set It Off announced that they would be leaving Equal Vision and signing to Fearless Records.

At the beginning of the year, Set It Off did a livestream video on YouTube in order to write a song with its audience. Over 1,000 people came into the stream and submitted their lyric ideas. The band members took their favorite lyrics from those suggested and added guitar parts and melodies to create their single "Hourglass Love", released on YouTube soon after, on January 4.

On July 24, Set It Off released its single "Killer in the Mirror" with a music video. On November 19, they announced on Twitter that their fourth studio album Midnight, would be released on February 1, 2019. Also, on that same day, they released their single "Lonely Dance" including a music video. One month later, on December 14, they released two singles, "For You Forever" and "Dancing with the Devil", from Midnight.

They released "Midnight Thoughts" to celebrate the new year 2019. Allegations of sexual assault against Dan Clermont were released on an anonymous Twitter account in May. The band announced that Dan would be taking a hiatus from the band to be with his family while this matter is addressed. One month later, vocalist Cody Carson announced that he had a vocal haemorrhage, just after the final date of Part 2 of the Midnight World Tour. He continued with Part 3 of the tour despite this.

On June 28, an acoustic version of "Wolf in Sheep's Clothing" from Duality was featured on Punk Goes Acoustic Vol. 3.

On September 11, after Part 3 of the Midnight World Tour, vocalist Cody Carson announced that due to his vocal cord injury he had to have surgery. As a result, Part 4 of the tour was delayed to March 2020. At the end of the month, the band announced the departure of Dan Clermont in a Tweet. The Tweet mentions he left "in order to focus on other areas of his life". Subsequently, according to the same Tweet, the band announced they have decided to continue on as a three-piece group.

On February 14, 2020, they released their fifth EP titled After Midnight.

One year later, on June 4, 2021, they released an expanded edition of Midnight called Midnight: The Final Chapter. This expansion includes the songs of the After Midnight EP and three acoustic renditions of the original release of the album.

=== Elsewhere (2021–2022) ===
The band released a single titled "Skeleton" on October 29, 2021. On January 21, 2022, they released a song titled "Projector", alongside the announcement of the album. They released the third single "Who's In Control", on February 18.

The band's "Welcome to Elsewhere Tour" ran from January 14, 2022 to February 12 of the same year.

On March 11, 2022, the band released their fifth album, titled Elsewhere.

=== Going independent and Self-Titled (2023–present) ===
In 2023, Set It Off left Fearless Records and went independent. They announced their new era, "Dopamine", with a tour and a new single, "Punching Bag". The song premiered on March 23, 2023, and was officially released the following day. It was the first independent single by the band. They have since released the singles "Win Win" featuring Scene Queen, "Evil People" and "Parasite" and announced a new tour in November 2023, called "The Deathless Tour". On March 1, 2024, they released the single "Fake Ass Friends" and on September 13, 2024, the single "Creating Monsters" after starting a new leg of the Deathless Tour.

On October 14, 2024, shortly after releasing merch celebrating the 10 year anniversary of the "Duality" album, the official Set It Off Instagram account announced a re-recording of "Wolf in Sheep's Clothing", titled "Wolf in Sheep's Clothing [Reborn]". The caption for the Instagram post included "our version, on our terms, for you", referencing the fact that the original recording of the song was owned by Equal Vision, the band's previous record label. The re-recording had new and reprised lyrics; did not feature the appearance of William Beckett, who featured in the original recording; and took on a much heavier tone, following the trend of recent independent singles.

On the 7th of November, 2025, they released a new album titled 'Set It Off', featuring previously released songs 'Parasite' and 'Evil People', and new titles such as 'Pathological' and 'Switch'.

== Touring ==
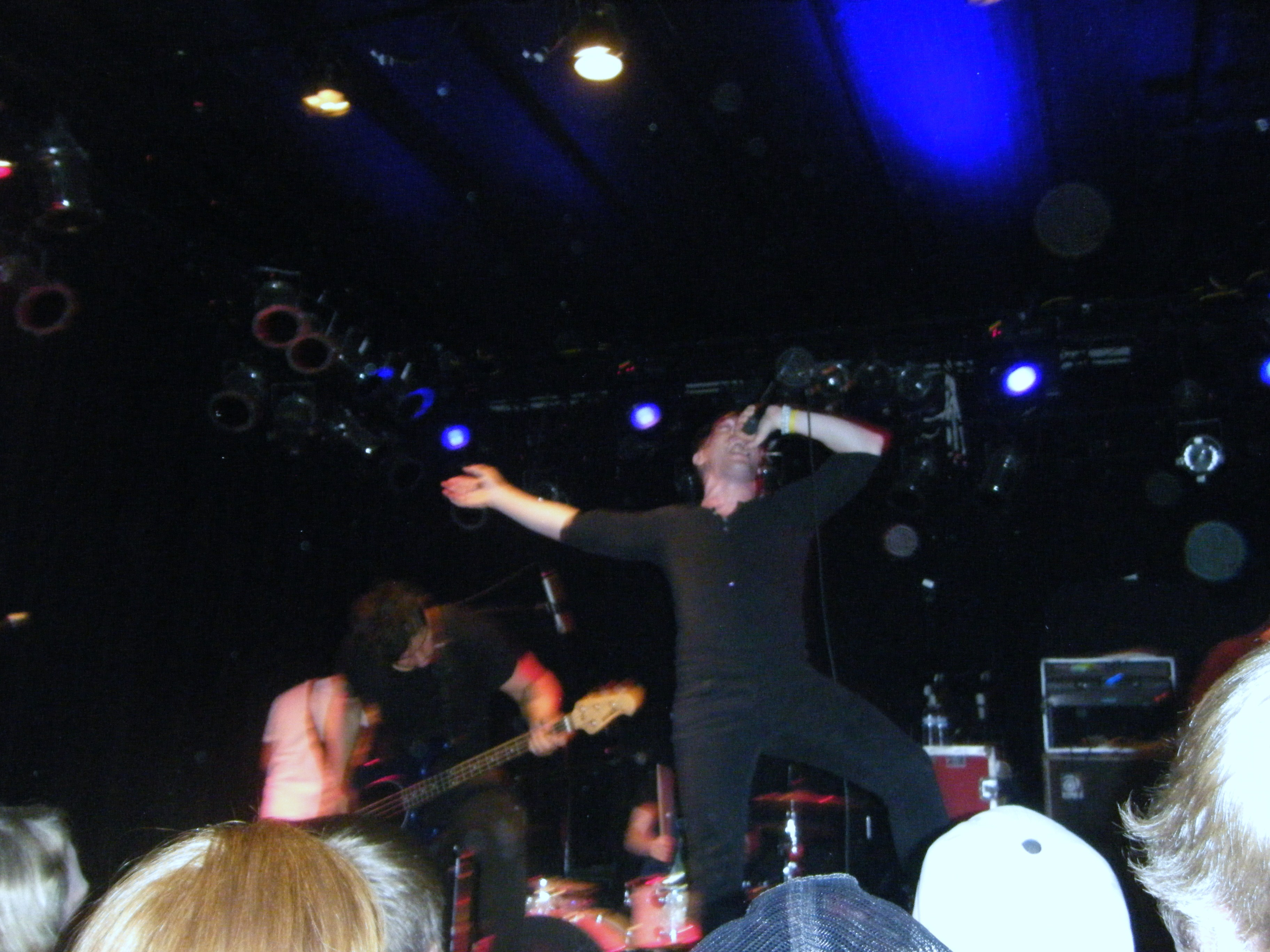
Set it Off performing at Vinyl Music Hall in Pensacola, FL

Up to November 2011, Set It Off played in over 19 tours. In 2013, Set It Off toured Europe with Yellowcard. In that same year, Set It Off supported Tonight Alive on its UK tour in October, along with Decade. The band played Warped Tour 2013 on dates 6/15-7/3 and 7/6-8/4 and played with Candy Hearts, State Champs, William Beckett, and We Are the In Crowd during WATIC's Reunion Tour in spring of 2014. The band also co-headlined the Come Alive Tour with Our Last Night, featuring Stages & Stereos and Heartist; supported Black Veil Brides and Falling in Reverse on the Black Mass Tour; and, beginning in February 2015, the group began its first USA headliner, The Glamour Kills Spring Break Tour, with support from Against The Current, As It Is, and Roam. The band played the entirety of the 2015 Vans Warped Tour. The band also played on the Rise of the Runaways Tour (January and February 2015), through various continents, with Crown the Empire and Alive Like Me.

From March 1 to March 28, 2016, Set It Off went on the Fight for Something Tour with Tonight Alive, and played the entirety of the 2016 Vans Warped Tour, except for the first show in Anchorage, Alaska. The band had since toured supporting Simple Plan and Sleeping With Sirens for some time after. This year, Set It Off went on their first headline tour from January 16 to February 16. Later, the band played at Vans Warped Tour, the last one ever, on July 27 in Mansfield, MA; July 28 in Wantagh, NY; and August 3 in Orlando, FL. In January and February 2020, the band headline-toured in the United States and Canada. In March 2020 they supported Japanese rock band ONE OK ROCK along with Brisbane-based band Stateside on the Australian leg of their Eye of the Storm world tour.

Their 2019 European tour (Midnight World Tour Part 4: UK/Europe) was postponed in September 2019 with rescheduled dates for March/April 2020 due to Cody Carson's vocal injury/vocal surgery. Broadside was to open for them at the rescheduled dates. However, these dates had to be postponed a second time due to the COVID-19 pandemic. The dates were moved to August/September 2020 with openers Broadside, Cemetery Sun, and Lizzy Farrall. They were then postponed again due to COVID, the tour was then renamed "Midnight Tour Part Four The Love Of God Don't Make Us Reschedule Again", it was then rescheduled two more times and renamed as the following "Midnight Tour Part Four The Love Of God Don't Make Us Reschedule Again, Again..." then ""Welcome to Elsewhere Tour", formally The Midnight World Tour Part Four The Love of God (Again) Please Don't Make Us Reschedule Again, Again", New dates for their EU/UK Tour were announced on March 25, 2022.

In January 2023, Set It Off announced a United States tour, the Dopamine Tour, with Scene Queen, In Her Own Words, and Rivals as special guests. They also participated in the following events: When We Were Young 2023, Download 2023, Rock am Ring and Rock im Park 2023 and Rock for People 2023. They went on the Truth Decay Australian Tour in July with Between You & Me supporting You Me at Six, and the Fear the Premiere Tour from August 15 to September 1 with The Plot in You supporting Ice Nine Kills. On November, Set It Off announced a new United States tour, the Deathless Tour, with Crown the Empire, Caskets and DeathbyRomy as special guests. The tour took place during March and April 2024.

After finishing the Deathless Tour on April 30, Set It Off went on to support I Prevail's European tour with musician Kid Bookie. They returned to United States and went to the Carnal Tour with From Ashes to New and Post Profit to support American rock band Nothing More. Set It Off played in the following festivals: Slam Dunk 2024, Aftershock 2024, Summerfest 2024 and Rocklahoma 2024. They were set to play at Louder Than Life 2024 but the show of that day was cancelled due to weather conditions. Due to the success of The Deathless Tour, Set It Off announced a part two with New Years Day, From Ashes to New and If Not For Me as special guests, taking place right after the end of the Carnal Tour. They went to their first headliner tour in Australia on November with supporters Chez and Friends of Friends.

At the start of 2025, Set It Off went to their Europe/UK tour with special guests Point North, TSS and Call Me Amour. Then they went to support American rap rock band Hollywood Undead and American rapper Tech N9ne in their "Hollywood & N9ne Returns" tour with Zero 9:36. This year, Set It Off played in the following festivals: Dead Pop Festival 2025, Louder Than Life 2025, Welcome to Rockville 2025 and Sonic Temple 2025. To support the release of their self-titled album, Set It Off announced "The Self-titled Tour" with supporters Fame On Fire, Vana and The Pretty Wild. However, unforeseen circumstances made The Pretty Wild departure from the tour, making the band announce new supporters Autumn Kings and Taken By Tides.

== Musical style ==
During Set It Off's early years the band fit into pop-punk and emo exclusively, but they added R&B elements with Duality in 2014. Vocalist Cody Carson cited Fall Out Boy, Panic! at the Disco, My Chemical Romance, and New Found Glory as their primary influences in the earlier years of the band. In 2015, Kerrang! summarized the band's genre as pop rock. The band introduced hip hop beginning with 2019's Midnight. In an interview at the end of 2022, Cody exclaimed that they wanted to dive into things the visited before or styles they haven't try yet. In 2025, Distorted Sound Magazine generalized the band sound as alternative metal.

== Band members ==
Set It Off live at Rock am Ring 2023

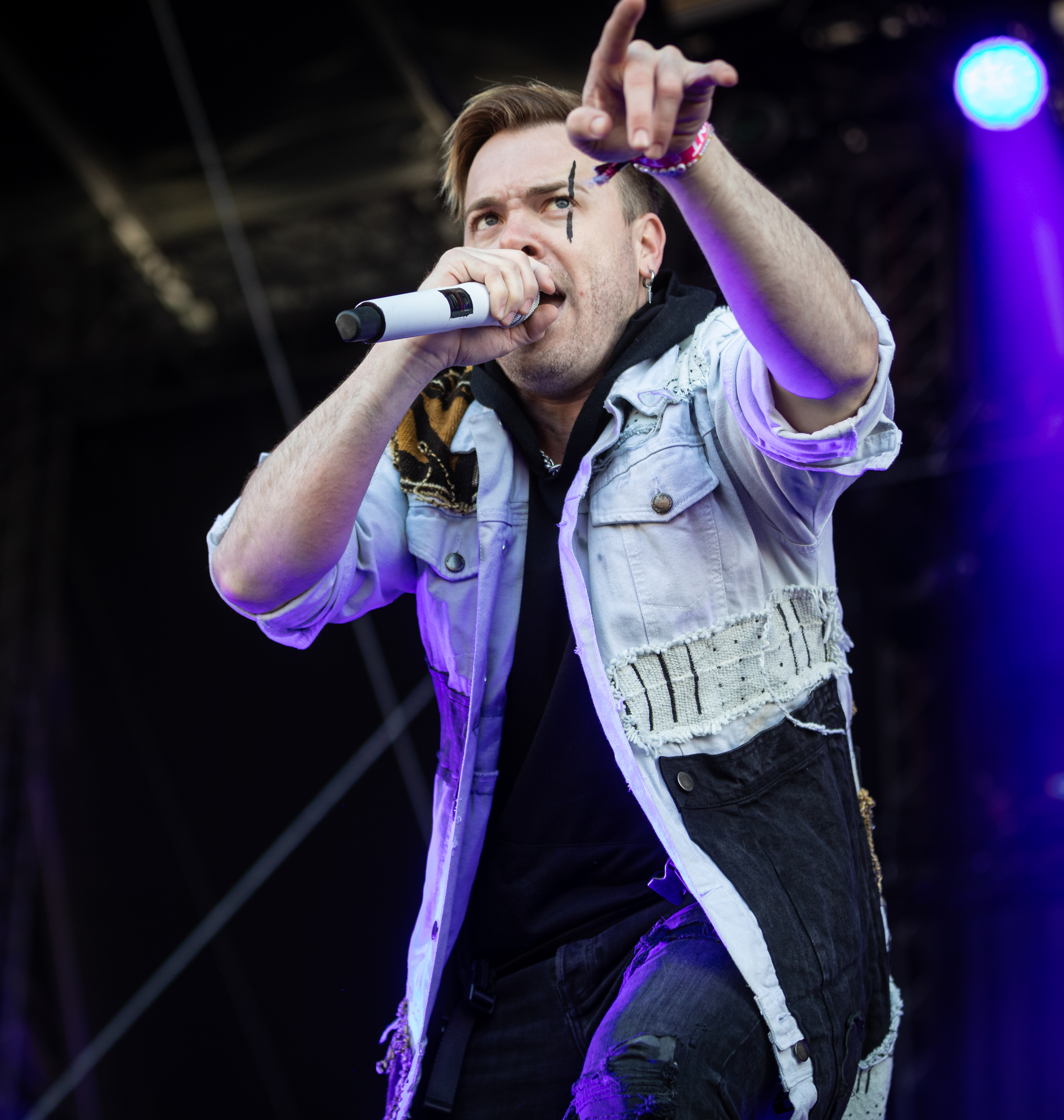
Cody Carson

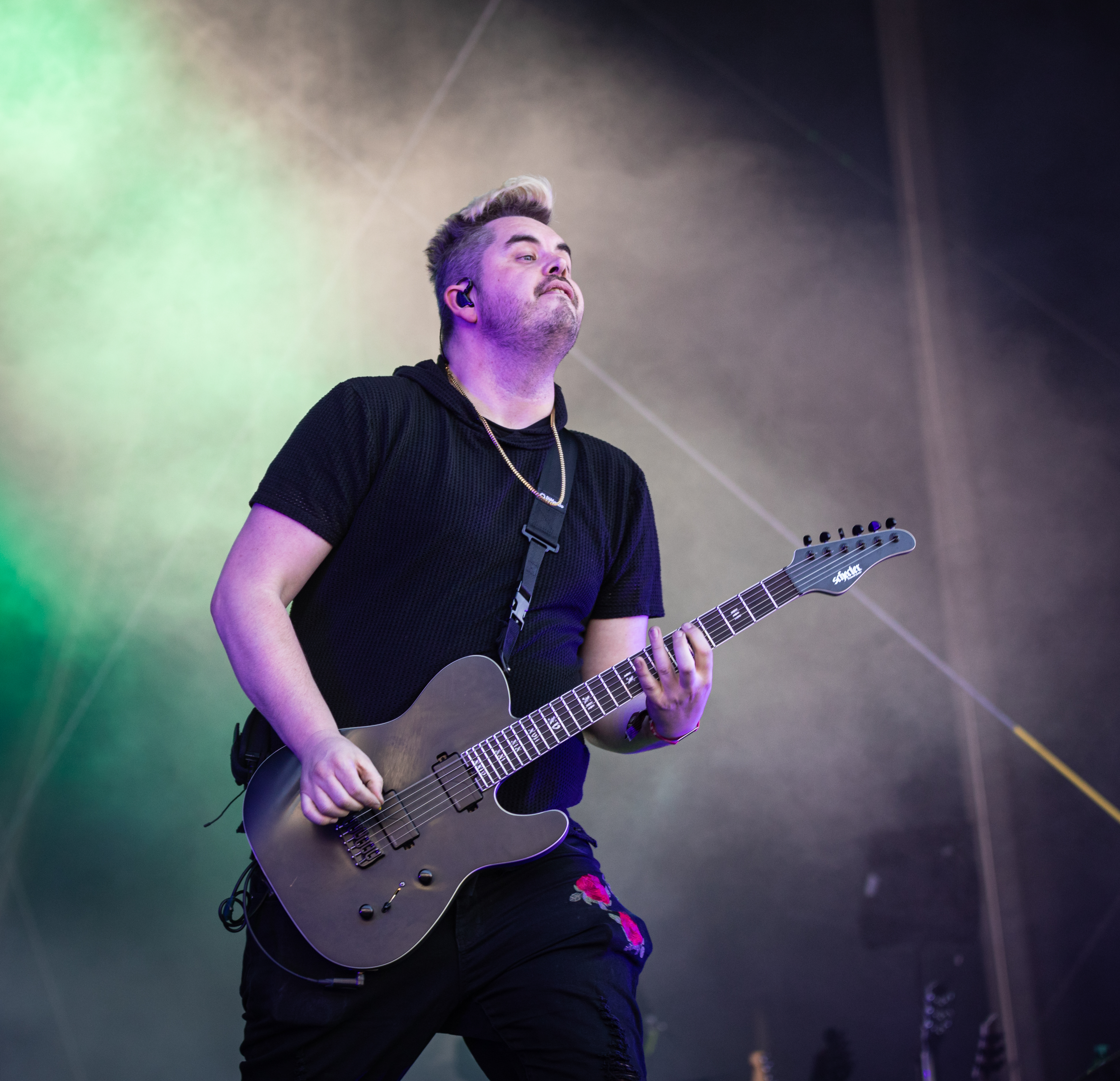
Zach Dewall

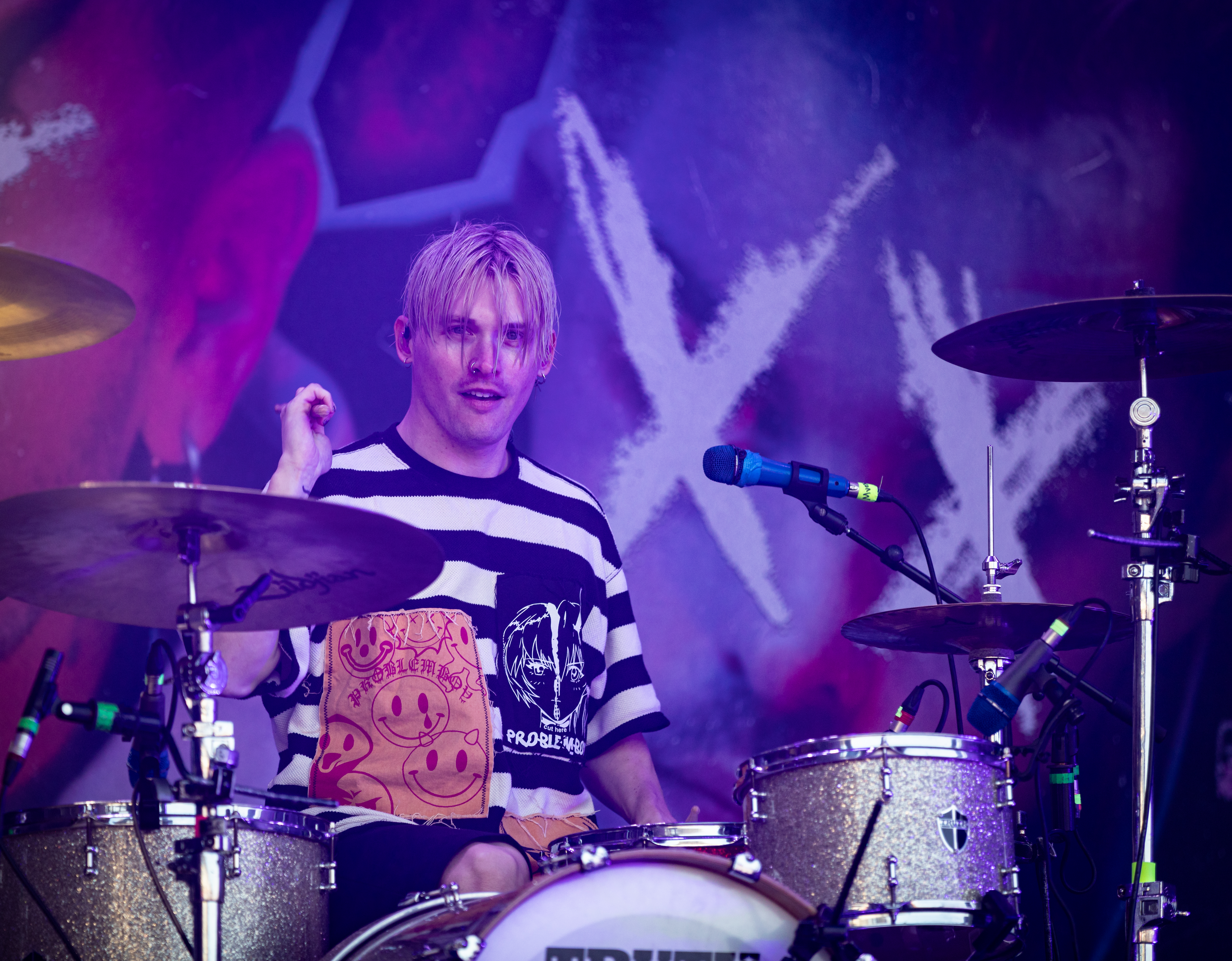
Maxx Danziger

Current

- Cody Carson – lead vocals, keyboards, piano, guitar, clarinet, alto saxophone (2008–present), drums, backing vocals (2023-present)
- Zach DeWall – guitar, backing vocals (2008–present), bass (2015–present)
- Maxx Danziger – drums (2010–present), backing and lead vocals (2023–present)

Former

- James Arran – drums (2008)
- Blake Howell – drums (2008)
- Benji Panico – drums (2008–2010)
- Austin Kerr – bass (2008–2015)
- Dan Clermont – guitar, keyboards, piano, trumpet, backing vocals (2008–2019)

Timeline

== Discography ==
=== Studio albums ===
List of studio albums with selected chart positions.
Title	Album details	Peak Charts Positions	
Title	Album details	US	SCO
Cinematics	Released: September 18, 2012; Label: Equal Vision; Formats: CD, DL	174	—
Duality	Released: October 14, 2014; Label: Equal Vision, Rude; Formats: CD, DL, LP	86	—
Upside Down	Released: October 7, 2016; Label: Equal Vision, Rude; Formats: CD, DL, LP	51	—
Midnight	Released: February 1, 2019; Label: Fearless; Formats: CD, DL, LP	86	81
Elsewhere	Released: March 11, 2022; Label: Fearless; Formats: CD, DL, LP	—	—
Set It Off	Released: November 7, 2025; Label: Self-released; Formats: CD, DL, LP	—	—

=== Extended plays ===
List of extended plays
Title	EP details
Baby, You Don't Tripajaharda	Released: October 31, 2008; Label: Self-Released; Formats: DL
Calm Before The Storm	Released: May 12, 2009; Label: Self-Released; Formats: DL
Horrible Kids	Released: August 30, 2011; Label: Equal Vision; Formats: CD, DL
Duality: Stories Unplugged	Released: June 23, 2015; Label: Equal Vision, Rude; Formats: CD, DL
After Midnight	Released: February 14, 2020; Label: Fearless; Formats: DL

=== Singles ===
List of singles, showing year released and album name
Title	Year	Peak chart positions				Certifications	Album
Title	Year	US Main.	US Hard Rock	US Rock	NZ Hot	Certifications	Album
"Hush Hush"	2010	—	×	—	—		Non-album singles
"Together Forever"	2010	—	×	—	—		Non-album singles
"@Reply"	2010	—	×	—	—		Horrible Kids
"I'll Sleep When I'm Dead"	2012	—	×	—	—		Cinematics
"Swan Song"	2012	—	×	—	—		Cinematics
"Partners in Crime" (featuring Ash Costello)	2013	—	×	—	—	RIAA: Gold	Cinematics: Expanded Edition
"Why Worry"	2014	—	×	—	—	RIAA: Gold	Duality
"N.M.E."	2014	—	×	—	—		Duality
"Tomorrow"	2014	—	×	—	—		Duality
"Wild Wild World"	2015	—	×	—	—		Duality: Stories Unplugged
"Something New"	2016	—	×	—	—		Upside Down
"Uncontainable"	2016	—	×	—	—		Upside Down
"Life Afraid"	2016	—	×	—	—		Upside Down
"Killer in the Mirror"	2018	—	×	—	—		Midnight
"Lonely Dance"	2018	—	×	—	—		Midnight
"Dancing with the Devil"	2018	—	×	—	—		Midnight
"For You Forever"	2018	—	×	—	—		Midnight
"Midnight Thoughts"	2019	—	×	—	—		Midnight
"Catch Me If You Can"	2019	—	×	—	—		After Midnight
"So Predictable"	2020	—	—	—	—		After Midnight
"One Single Second"	2020	—	—	—	—		After Midnight
"Skeleton"	2021	—	—	—	—		Elsewhere
"Skeleton" (Slowed & Reverb)	2022	—	—	—	—		Non-album single
"Projector"	2022	—	—	—	—		Elsewhere
"Who's in Control"	2022	—	—	—	—		Elsewhere
"Why Do I" (original or featuring Hatsune Miku)	2022	—	—	—	—		Elsewhere
"Punching Bag"	2023	26	—	—	—		Set It Off
"Win Win" (featuring Scene Queen)	2023	—	—	—	—		Non-album single
"Punching Bag" (Acoustic)	2023	—	—	—	—		Non-album single
"Evil People"	2023	—	—	—	—		Set It Off
"Parasite"	2023	—	—	—	—		Set It Off
"Fake Ass Friends"	2024	18	15	—	—		Set It Off
"Points of Authority" (Linkin Park cover)	2024	—	—	—	—		Non-album single
"Creating Monsters"	2024	—	—	—	—		Set It Off
"Wolf in Sheep's Clothing (Reborn)"	2024	25	—	39	26		Set It Off
"Rotten"	2025	30	—	—	—		Set It Off
"Pathological"	2025	—	—	—	—		Set It Off

=== Promotional singles ===
Title	Year	Album
"Pages & Paragraphs"	2009	Calm Before the Storm
"Breathe In, Breathe Out"	2011	Horrible Kids
"Horrible Kids"	2011	Horrible Kids
"Kill The Lights"	2013	Cinematics: Expanded Edition
"Ancient History"	2015	Duality
"Forever Stuck In Our Youth"	2015	Duality
"Bleak December - Acoustic"	2015	Duality: Stories Unplugged
"The Haunting"	2015	Duality
"Duality"	2016	Duality
"Hypnotized"	2017	Upside Down
"Hourglass"	2019	Midnight
"Happy All The Time - Acoustic"	2021	Midnight: The Final Chapter
"Dangerous"	2022	Elsewhere

==== As featured artist ====
Title	Year	Peak chart positions	Album
Title	Year	US Main.	Album
"IN THREES" (As It Is feat. Set It Off and JordyPurp)	2021	×	I Went to Hell and Back
"Older" (No Love For the Middle Child x Set It Off)	2021	×	Non-album single
"Barbie & Ken" (Scene Queen x Set It Off)	2022	×	Bimbocore, Vol. 2
"Below the Belt" (Point North feat. Set It Off)	2023	22	Non-album single

==== Other appearances ====
Title	Original Artist	Year	Album
"This Christmas (I'll Burn it to the Ground)"	Set It Off	2013	Punk Goes Christmas
"Problem"	Ariana Grande (feat. Iggy Azalea)	2014	Punk Goes Pop Vol. 6
"Wolf In Sheep's Clothing"	Set It Off	2019	Punk Goes Acoustic Vol. 3

=== Other certified songs ===
Title	Year	Certifications	Album
"Wolf In Sheep's Clothing" (feat. William Beckett)	2014	RIAA: Platinum; BPI: Silver	Duality

=== Music videos ===
List of official music videos, showing year released, album name and director
Title	Year	Album	Director	ref.
"Pages & Paragraphs"	2009	Calm Before the Storm	Mikey Ortiz	
"Hush Hush"	2011	Non-album single	Michael Patti	
"@Reply"	2011	Horrible Kids	Michael Patti	
"Breathe In, Breathe Out"	2011	Horrible Kids	Michael Patti	
"Horrible Kids"	2012	Horrible Kids	Unknown	
"Swan Song"	2012	Cinematics	Unknown	
"Partners in Crime"	2013	Cinematics: Expanded Edition	DJay Brawner	
"This Christmas (I'll Burn It To the Ground)"	2013	Punk Goes Christmas	TyJens Media	
"Why Worry"	2014	Duality	Rob Soucy	
"Tomorrow"	2014	Duality	Alex Wohleber	
"Ancient History"	2015	Duality	Freddy Marschall and Cody Carson	
"Bleak December - Acoustic"	2015	Duality: Stories Unplugged	Unknown	
"Forever Stuck In Our Youth"	2015	Duality	Freddy Marschall and Cody Carson	
"Wild Wild World"	2015	Duality: Stories Unplugged	Freddy Marschall and Cody Carson	
"The Haunting"	2015	Duality	Carlo Oppermann	
"Duality"	2016	Duality	Sam Schneider	
"Uncontainable"	2016	Upside Down	Robyn August	
"Something New"	2016	Upside Down	Unknown	
"Life Afraid"	2016	Upside Down	Matt Alonzo	
"Hypnotized"	2017	Upside Down	Matt Alonzo	
"Killer in the Mirror"	2018	Midnight	Shelby Lee Anne	
"Lonely Dance"	2018	Midnight	Shelby Lee Anne	
"Dancing with the Devil"	2019	Midnight	Shelby Lee Anne	
"Hourglass"	2019	Midnight	Shelby Lee Anne	
"Happy All The Time - Acoustic"	2021	Midnight: The Final Chapter	Samuel Hallen	
"Skeleton"	2021	Elsewhere	Deathcats	
"Projector"	2022	Elsewhere	Deathcats	
"Why Do I"	2022	Elsewhere	Deathcats	
"Dangerous"	2022	Elsewhere	Deathcats	
"Punching Bag"	2023	Set It Off	Sam Link	
"Win Win"	2023	Non-album single	Sam Link	
"Rotten"	2025	Set It Off	Yulia Shur	

=== Lyric videos ===
List of official lyric videos, showing year released and album name
Title	Year	Album	Type	Ref.
"I'll Sleep When I'm Dead"	2012	Cinematics	Imagery matches the lyrics	
"Swan Song"	2012	Cinematics	Imagery matches the lyrics	
"Kill The Lights"	2013	Cinematics: Expanded Edition	Imagery matches the lyrics	
"Bleak December"	2015	Duality	Lyrics are being written in a book	
"Life Afraid"	2016	Upside Down	Text and backgrounds changing between white and light blue	
"Punching Bag"	2023	Set It Off	Faceless man surrounded by a snake and televisions	
"Wolf In Sheep's Clothing"	2023	Duality	White text on changing background	
"Fake Ass Friends"	2024	Set It Off	Red and white text on purple background	
