= Point North =

American metal band

- Origin: Los Angeles, California, U.S.
- Genres: Pop-punk; alternative rock; pop rock; post hardcore; metalcore
- Years active: 2017–Present
- Labels: We Are Triumphant; Hopeless
- Members: Jon Lundin; Andy Hersey
- Past members: Benji Bryan; Sage Weeber; Brady Szuhaj; Timmy Rasmussen
- Website: pointnorthband.com

Point North is an American rock band from Los Angeles, California, formed in 2017 by lead singer Jon Lundin, guitarist/vocalist Benji Bryan, and guitarist Andy Hersey. Drummer Sage Weeber joined the band in 2019.

They have released three studio albums to date, and have collaborated on singles with The Ghost Inside and Set It Off. They have also toured with Set It Off and From Ashes to New.

== Discography ==
=== Studio albums ===
List of studio albums with selected chart positions.
Title	Album details	Peak Charts Positions	
Title	Album details	US	SCO
Brand New Vision	Released: August 21, 2020; Label: Hopeless Records; Formats: CD, DL, LP	—	—
Prepare For Despair	Released: August 18, 2023; Label: Hopeless Records; Formats: CD, DL, LP	—	—

=== Extended plays ===
List of extended plays
Title	EP details
A Light in a Dark Place	Released: July 6, 2018; Label: We Are Triumphant; Formats: CD, DL
Retrograde	Released: August 21, 2020; Label: Hopeless Records; Formats: CD, DL, LP

=== Singles ===
Title	Year	Peak chart positions	Album
Title	Year	US Main.	Album
"Hammer"(Nothing,Nowhere Cover)	2018	x	Non-album single
"Empathy"	2018	x	A Light in a Dark Place
"Paranoid" (Post Malone Cover)	2018	x	Non-album single
"Dearly Departed"	2018	x	A Light in a Dark Place
"Everybody Fades"	2018	x	A Light in a Dark Place
"Ghost In My Home"	2018	x	Non-album single
"Gasoline"	2019	x	Retrograde
"Heartbeat"	2019	x	Brand New vision
"Into The Dark"(with Kellin Quinn)	2020	x	Brand New vision
"Brand New Vision"	2020	x	Brand New vision
"No One's Listening"	2020	x	Brand New vision
"Nice Now"	2021	x	Non-album singles
"Erase You"	2021	x	Non-album singles
"STITCH ME UP"	2021	x	Non-album singles
"Dark Days" (with Jeris Johnson)	2022	x	Prepare for Despair
"RECOVER"	2022	x	Prepare for Despair
"Safe and Sound" (with The Ghost Inside)	2023	20	Prepare for Despair
"Someone You Don't Know"	2023	—	Prepare for Despair
"Psycho"	2023	—	Prepare for Despair
"Below the Belt" (original or with Set It Off)	2023	22	Prepare for Despair
"Unholy Confessions" (Avenged Sevenfold cover)	2024	—	Non-album single
"Bring Me Down"	2024	—	Non-album single
"World {vs} Peace"	2024	31	Non-album single
"2 Liter Spite"	2025	—	Non-album single
"Dead 2 Me"	2025	x	Non-album single
"—" denotes a recording that did not chart or was not released in that territory. "×" denotes periods where charts did not exist or were not archived.

==== As featured artist ====
Title	Year	Peak chart positions	Album
Title	Year	US Main.	Album
"Take Me Whenever" (Sincerely Me, Point North)	2020	—	Half Empty
"Lifeline" (Kayzo, Black Tiger Sex Machine, Point North)	2021	—	Non-album single
"This Will Be My Year" (Two Friends, Point North)	2021	—	Useless
"PARANOIA" (GARZI, FEVER 333, Jason Aalon Butler, Point North)	2022	—	Careful What You Wish For
"BODY BAG" (Fran Roz, Point North)	2022	—	Non-album single
"Shatterproof" (William Black, Mazare, Point North)	2023	—	The Nature of Hope
"on the outside" (Charlotte Sands, Point North)	2024	—	Non-album single
"Charlie Sheen" (FELICITY, Point North)	2024	—	Non-album single
"Not My Night" (Fairlane, Point North)	2024	—	Genesis
"Hellbound" (Autumn Kings, Point North)	2025	18	Epiphanies
"Not Giving Up" (Kai Wachi, Point North)	2025	—	NEKROSIS
"Careful What You Wish For" (Ray Volpe, Point North)	2025	—	FOREVER, VOLPETRON

=== Music Videos ===
Title	Year	Director	Album
"Ghost In My Home"	2018	Ryan Sheehy	Non-album single
"Never Coming Home"	2019	Unknown	Retrograde
"Heartbeat"	2019	BRAVERIJAH	Brand New Vision
"Into the Dark"	2020	Bryan Castellanos	Brand New Vision
"Brand New Vision"	2020	Ryan Sheehy	Brand New Vision
"No One's Listening"	2020	Erik Rojas	Brand New Vision
"Nice Now"	2021	Joe Striff	Non-album single
"Stitch Me Up"	2021	Bridget Craig and Niles Gregory	Non-album single
"Dark Days"	2022	Ryan Watanabe	Prepare for Despair
"Safe and Sound"	2023	Christian Lawrence	Prepare for Despair
"World {vs} Peace"	2024	SPVCE	Non-album single
"2 Liter Spite"	2025	Nick Riggs	Non-album single
