= Autumn Kings =

Band

- Origin: LaSalle, Ontario, Canada
- Genres: Hard rock; pop rock; alternative rock
- Years active: 2015–present
- Label: Hopeless Records
- Members: Jake Diab; Joseph Coccimiglio; Troy Dawd; Sky Werth (Touring)
- Past members: Tibor Bognar; Jeremie Brousseau
- Website: www.autumnkings.com

Autumn Kings is a Canadian rock band formed in LaSalle, Ontario, in 2015, who have since relocated to Detroit, Michigan, United States. They started as an independent band but signed with label Hopeless Records in August 2024. Their inspiration for their music stems from Linkin Park and Metallica. The band mixes alternative metal & post-hardcore with elements of hip-hop and catchy rythmes, giving the band a distinguished sound.

== Band Members ==
Current

- Jake Diab - Guitar, co-lead and rap vocals
- Joseph Coccimiglio - Lead vocals
- Troy Dawdy - Drums
- Sky Werth - bass

Former

- Tibor Bognar - bass
- Jeremie Brousseau - Drums

== Discography ==
=== Albums ===
- Silver Screens (2017)
- Book of the Broken (2022)
- Unplugged Sessions (2023)
- Epiphanies (2026)

=== EP ===
- Electrified (2019)

=== Singles ===
Title	Year	Peak chart positions				Album
Title	Year	US Hard Rock	US Main.	US Airplay	CAN Main. Rock	Album
"Sleep When I'm Dead"	2024	—	16	—	—	Epiphanies
"Hellbound" (original or with Point North)	2024	—	18	—	—	Epiphanies
"Gone, Gone, Gone"	2026	16	2	14	40	Epiphanies
"Only Human"	2026	—	—	—	—	Epiphanies

=== Promotional Singles ===
Year	Title	Album
2025	"Snake Charmer"	Epiphanies
2025	"Tongue Tied"	Epiphanies
2026	"Become Numb"	Epiphanies
2026	"Young Bloods" (feat. Howard Jones)	Epiphanies

=== Music videos ===
Title	Year	Album	Director(s)	Note(s)
"Livin' La Vida Loca"	2016	Silver Screens		Ricky Martin cover
"Illusion"	2017	Silver Screens		
"If I Leave Today"	2017	Silver Screens	Gene Schilling and Donny Rose	
"Fighting a Monster"	2018	Silver Screens	Travis Ross and Sam Ross	
"Devil In Disguise"	2018	Silver Screens	Travis Ross and Sam Ross	
"Want You to Stay"	2019	Electrified	Travis Ross and Sam Ross	
"Need Your Love"	2019	Electrified	Travis Ross	
"Asshole"	2020			
"Happy Xmas (War Is Over)"	2020			The Plastic Ono Band cover
"I Hates Goodbyes"	2021		Rafael Piñeros	
"Tension"	2021		Henry Nadasdi	
"Castles"	2022	Book of the Broken	Henry Nadasdi	
"Terrified"	2022	Book of the Broken	Cynx Media	
"One Last Breath"	2023	Book of the Broken	Henry Nadasdi	
"Clouds"	2023	Book of the Broken	Henry Nadasdi	
"Dream On"	2023	Book of the Broken	Henry Nadasdi	Aerosmith cover
"Go For Gold"	2023	Book of the Broken		Cynx Media
"Sleep When I'm Dead"	2024	Epiphanies	Justin Everest	
"Hellbound"	2024	Epiphanies	Henry Nadasdi	2 videos made
"Hellbound"	2024	Epiphanies	Justin Everest	2 videos made
"Gone, Gone, Gone"	2026	Epiphanies	Henry Nadasdi	
"Young Bloods"	2026	Epiphanies		
"Only Human"	2026	Epiphanies		
