= Wall of Sound (website) =

American music website

- Founded: Mid-1990s
- Website: www.wallofsound.com
- Current status: Defunct

Wall of Sound was an American music website that provided news, reviews, and information on musical artists. The site was launched and developed in the mid-1990s by Paul Allen's software and website company, Starwave, in Seattle, Washington. In April 1997, Starwave entered into a joint venture partnership with ABC News, which expanded the coverage of the company's internet services into the ABC domain. A year later, Wall of Sound – along with Starwave sites such as Mr. Showbiz, NBA.com and NASCAR Online – was part of a joint e-commerce initiative between ABC and ESPN.

The Wall of Sound offices were located in Smith Tower in central Seattle. The website was named after American producer Phil Spector's Wall of Sound production technique. Its editor was Erik Flannigan, who had previously written for The Rocket and co-authored a 1991 biography of Led Zeppelin.

The site's music reviews were often included in Metacritic's aggregate scores. A co-founder of Wall of Sound, Anders Wright served as news editor; over the same period, he also wrote for Mr. Showbiz and ESPN.com. Representing Wall of Sound in February 2000, Wright spoke out against the National Academy of Recording Arts and Sciences (NARAS), protesting its exclusion of online music journalists from the Grammy Awards ceremony after the Los Angeles Times had published a series of articles alleging corruption within NARAS. In reaction to NARAS' apparent failure to recognize the growing importance of the internet, Alders said: "All they're doing is making it harder for people to get information about the Grammys." Other regular contributors to the site included music critics Gary Graff and Daniel Durchholz, who together edited titles in the MusicHound album guide series.

By 2004, Wall of Sound was majority-owned by the The Walt Disney Company. The website's URL currently redirects to ABC's Go.com portal.
