= Austin Kerr =

American musician

- Also known as: PRGRSS
- Born: Austin Kerr; July 7, 1989 (age 37); Clearwater, Florida, U.S.
- Genres: Pop rock; hip hop
- Occupations: Musician, rapper
- Instrument: Bass guitar
- Years active: 2008–present
- Formerly of: Set It Off

Austin Kerr is an American musician, and business owner, best known for his role as a bassist in the American pop rock band Set It Off. He is also a rapper known by the stage name PRGRSS. and is the founder of the business software Humanagement.io

== Career ==
In 2008, Austin Kerr formed the rock band Set It Off with Cody Carson (vocalist/keyboardist/rhythm guitarist), Dan Clermont (lead guitarist/keyboardist), and Zach DeWall (rhythm/lead guitarist). Their first EP, Baby, You Don't Tripajaharda, was released on October 31, 2008. A subsequent EP, Calm Before the Storm, was released on May 12, 2009. In May 2015, Set It Off announced that Kerr would no longer be a part of the band following sexual harassment allegations.

After his career with Set It Off, Kerr then went on to become an independent rapper under the name PRGRSS, and also became a founding member of the real estate company Equity & Help.

In 2022, Kerr founded the business software company Humanagement.io

== Media ==
Kerr has been in interviewed on various media programs, including the Think Realty Radio Show.

== Selected publications ==
Kerr is also the author of the poetry book Dear Listener: I'm Breathing Are You, published in 2013.
