= Fame on Fire =

American rap rock musical group

- Origin: Palm Beach, Florida, United States
- Genres: Hard rock; pop metal; rap rock; metalcore
- Years active: 2013–present
- Label: Hopeless
- Members: Bryan Kuznitz; Alex Roman; Paul Spirou
- Past members: Blake Saul
- Website: fameonfireband.com

Fame on Fire is an American rock band from Palm Beach, Florida, United States.

== History ==
The band was formed by current members in 2013, and started out as a cover band, releasing metal covers for songs by famous artists such as XXXTentacion, Lil Uzi Vert, Ed Sheeran, Juice Wrld, The Weeknd, Halsey, and others. They received recognition in 2015, after releasing a cover of Adele's song, "Hello". In 2017, they released the EP Transitions, containing five original songs. In 2020 they released their debut studio album, Levels. The song "Her Eyes" reached number one on Sirius XM Octane. They released their second LP, Welcome to the Chaos, in 2022.

== Members ==
Current members

- Bryan Kuznitz - vocals (2013–present)
- Paul Spirou - bass (2013–present)
- Alex Roman - drums (2013–present)

Former members

- Blake Saul - guitar (2013–2025)

Touring members

- Niko Foxx - guitar (2025-present)

== Discography ==
=== Studio albums ===
- Levels (2020)
- Welcome to the Chaos (2022)
- The Death Card (2024)

=== Extended Plays ===
- Transitions (2016)

=== Singles ===
Year	Title	Peak chart positions			Album
Year	Title	US Airplay	US Hot Hard Rock	US Main. Rock	Album
2020	"Headspace" (feat. POORSTACY)	—	—	34	Levels
2022	"Plastic Heart"	—	16	29	Welcome To The Chaos
2022	"Welcome To the Chaos" (feat. Spencer Charnas)	—	—	16	Welcome To The Chaos
2024	"Nightmare (The Devil)"	—	—	12	The Death Card
2024	"Chains (The Tower)" (with SiM)	47	—	14	The Death Card

=== Promotional singles ===
Title	Year	Album
"I'm Fine"	2021	Levels
"Lost In Doubt"	2022	Welcome To the Chaos
"Cut Throat"	2022	Welcome To the Chaos
"Ketamine"	2022	Welcome To the Chaos
"Spiral (Justice)"	2024	The Death Card
"Suicide (The Lovers)"	2024	The Death Card
"Nothing Left (The Fool)"	2024	The Death Card

== Music videos ==
Title	Year	Director(s)
"Give Me It All"	2016	Unknown
"Another One"	2017	Joey Ambrose
"For You"	2017	Unknown
"Bussin' Pieces"	2018	Unknown
"One Night"	2018	Unknown
"Count It Up"	2018	Unknown
"Back To You"	2018	Afflux Studios
"Her Eyes"	2019	Unknown
"Not Dead Yet"	2019	Joey Ambrose
"Headspace"	2020	Fame on Fire
"I'm Fine"	2021	Fame on Fire
"It's Okay"	2021	Fame on Fire
"Plastic Heart"	2022	Manuel Soto and Roman Films
"Lost In Doubt"	2022	Unknown
"Cut Throat"	2022	Unknown
"Welcome To the Chaos"	2022	Manuel Soto and Roman Films
"Spiral (Justice)"	2024	Unknown
"Nightmare (The Devil)"	2024	Orie McGinness
"Suicide (The Lovers)"	2024	SPVCE
"Chains (The Tower)"	2024	Unknown
"Euphoria" (featuring Halocene)	2025	Bradley Amick and Bryan Kuznitz

== Cover songs ==
Fame on Fire has covered the following songs:

Song covered	Original artist
24K Magic	Bruno Mars
ABCDEFU	Gayle
All My Life	Lil Durk
All the Small Things	Blink-182
Anti-Hero	Taylor Swift
Black Beatles	Rae Sremmurd
Black Widow	Iggy Azalea
Blinding Lights	The Weeknd
Bye Bye	Marshmello
Calling	Metro Boomin
Can't Stop the Feeling	Justin Timberlake
Chemical	Post Malone
Congratulations	Post Malone
Creepin'	Metro Boomin
Cupid	Fifty Fifty
Dear Maria, Count Me In	All Time Low
Dirty Diana	Michael Jackson
Don't Let Me Down	The Chainsmokers
Everybody (Backstreet's Back)	Backstreet Boys
Fast Car	Luke Combs
Fireflies	Owl City
Flowers	Miley Cyrus
God's Plan	Drake
Golden Hour	JVKE
Greedy	Tate McRae
Gucci Gang	Lil Pump
Happier	Marshmello
Heavy	Linkin Park
Hello	Adele
Hello Friday	Flo Rida
Higher	Creed
The Hills	The Weeknd
I Love It	Kanye West
I Write Sins Not Tragedies	Panic! At the Disco
In My Feelings	Drake
It's Gonna Be Me	N*SYNC
Kryptonite	3 Doors Down
Last Night	Morgan Wallen
Lost	Linkin Park
Love Again	The Kid Laroi
Lovin On Me	Jack Harlow
Lucid Dreams	Juice WRLD
Misery Business	Paramore
Montero (Call Me By Your Name)	Lil Nas X
Mood	24kGoldn
Mr. Brightside	The Killers
Nightmare	Miley Cyrus
Numb	Linkin Park
Old Town Road	Lil Nas X
One Right Now	Post Malone
Paint the Town Red	Doja Cat
Pink Venom	BLACKPINK
Ransom	Lil Tecca
...Ready For It?	Taylor Swift
Religiously	Bailey Zimmerman
Rise	Katy Perry
Rockstar	Nickelback
Roxanne	Arizona Zervas
SAD!	XXXTentacion
Search and Rescue	Drake
Seven	Jung Kook
Shape of You	Ed Sheeran
Side to Side	Ariana Grande
Smells Like Teen Spirit	Nirvana
Stay	The Kid Laroi
Sugar	Maroon 5
Sugar, We're Going Down	Fall Out Boy
Sunroof	Nicky Youre
Sweetness	Jimmy Eat World
This Love	Maroon 5
Unconditionally	Katy Perry
Vampire	Olivia Rodrigo
Want to Want Me	Jason Derulo
Without Me	Halsey
XO TOUR Llif3	Lil Uzi Vert
Yeah!	Usher
You Proof	Morgan Wallen
Yummy	Justin Bieber
