= Brandon Paddock =

American musician, record producer

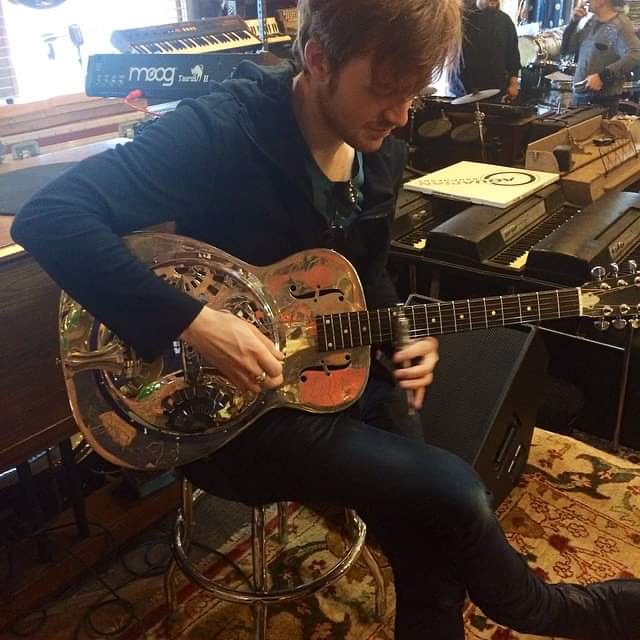

Brandon Paddock is an American pop and rock musician and producer and member of electronic pop/dance duo Fancy Cars.

== Commercial success ==
Paddock is an American pop and rock musician and producer. Paddock has received two RIAA Platinum Records (awarded for the shipment of 1,000,000 units) for his work on Avril Lavigne's "Here's to Never Growing Up" and Christina Perri's "Human". He also earned an RIAA Gold Record (awarded for the shipment of 500,000 units) for Karmin's "Acapella".

Paddock is also a member of electronic pop/dance duo Fancy Cars.

== Selected discography ==
Key: AP - Additional Production / P - producer / PRG - Programming / M - Mixer / E - Engineer / MA - Mastering / W - Writer / INST - other Instrumentation / VOX - Vocals / STRG - String Arrangement

Year	Artist	Title	Label	Role	Achievements
2019	Fancy Cars	Feel Alive/Promises	DiscoWax/Sony	ARTIST/W/P/M/MAS	
2019	Mackenzie Ziegler	Emoceans/Pieces		P/W/M/MAS	
2019	The Night Game	TBT upcoming LP		P/E/PRGM/GTR/BGV	
2019	Set It Off	Midnight	Fearless	P/W/M/MAS/AP/GTR/PRGM	
2018	Fancy Cars	Time Machine/Blue Moon/Brave/Get With Me	Virgin/Universal	ARTIST/W/P/M/MAS	
2018	Mackenzie Ziegler	Breathe		P/W/M/MAS	
2018	The Night Game	The Night Game	Interscope	P/AP/E/PRGM	
2017	Fancy Cars	Last Time Love/Belong To U/Stay The Same/I'll Follow	Virgin/Universal	ARTIST/W/P/M/MAS	
2017	Kirin J. Callinan	Bravado	Universal	PRGM	
2017	Volumes	Different Animals	Fearless	P/E/W/GTR	
2017	Veil of Maya	False Idol	Veil of Maya	VOX P/W	
2017	Echosmith	Inside a Dream	Warner Bros	AP/PRGM/KEYS	
2017	Palisades	Palisades	Rise	Producer, Mixing, Guitar, Programming	
2016	Fancy Cars	Set Me On Fire/Fun ft. Bazzi	Majestic Casual	ARTIST/W/P/M/MAS	
2016	Dan + Shay	Obsessed	Warner Bros	Banjo, Bass, Engineer, Mandolin, Programmer, Slide Guitar, Vocals	
2016	Set It Off	Upside Down	Equal Vision	P/E/PRG/M/INST/STRG/VOX	
2015	Pentatonix	Pentatonix	RCA	AP/E/BGV	
2015	Elle King	Love Stuff	RCA	AP/BASS/PIAN/PRGM	
2015	Coldrain	Vena	Hopeless Records/VAP, Inc	P/E/PRG/M/INST/STRG/VOX	
2015	Set It Off	Duality: Stories Unplugged	Equal Vision Records	P/E/PRG/W/M/INST/STRG/VOX	
2014	Set It Off	Duality	Equal Vision Records	P/E/PRG/W/M/INST/STRG/VOX	
2014	Timeflies	After Hours	Island Records	AP/E/PRG	
2014	Christina Perri	“Human” from Head or Heart	Atlantic Records	AP/E/PRG/INST	RIAA Platinum single “Human”
2014	Alex & Sierra	It's About Us	Syco/Columbia Records	AP/E/PRG/M(assist)/INST	
2014	Volumes	No Sleep	Mediaskare Records	P/E/M/PRG/INST/W	
2014	Karmin	Pulses	Epic Records	AP/E/PRG/VOX	RIAA Gold single “Acapella”
2014	Betty Who	Take Me When You Go	RCA	AP/E/PRG/INST/VOX	
2014	Gavin DeGraw	“You Got Me” from Finest Hour	RCA	AP/E/PRG/STRG/VOX	
2013	Natives	Indoor War	Transmission Recordings	P/E/M/W/PRG/INST/VOX	
2013	Avril Lavigne	Avril Lavigne	Epic	AP/E/PRG/INST/VOX	RIAA Platinum Single "Here's To Never Growing Up"
2013	Daughtry	Baptized	RCA	AP/E/PRG/INST/VOX	
2013	Heaven's Basement	Filthy Empire	Red Bull Records	E/M/PRG	
2013	Conditions	Full Of War	Good Fight Music	P/E/PRG/W/INST	
2013	Gavin DeGraw	Make A Move	RCA	AP/E/PRG/INST	
2013	Escape the Fate	Ungrateful	Eleven Seven Music	AP/E/PRG/INST	
2013	Life On Repeat	Blacklisted	Equal Vision Records	P/E/M/PRG/INST/W	
2012	Papa Roach	The Connection	Eleven Seven Music	E/PRG	
2012	Calisus	Skeleton Key	Mad Hatter Music	M/MA	
2012	The Used	Vulnerable	Hopeless Records	AP/E/PRGM/M/INST/VOX	#8 Billboard 200 Debut
2012	Throw the Fight	What Doesn’t Kill Us	Bullet Tooth Records	P/E/PRG/M/W/INST/VOX	
2011	The Cab	Symphony Soldier	Z Records	AP/E/PRGM/INST/M/VOX	#9 Billboard Top Rock Albums
2011	The Red Jumpsuit Apparatus	Am I the Enemy	Collective Sounds	AP/E/PRG/M/VOX	
2011	D.R.U.G.S.	Destroy Rebuild Until God Shows	Sire Records/Decaydance Records	AP/E/PRG/STRG//INST/VOX	
2011	Panic! at the Disco	Vices & Virtues	Fueled by Ramen/Decaydance Records	E	
2010	Four Year Strong	Enemy of the World	Universal Motown Records/Decaydance Records	M (assist)	
