= American Authors discography =

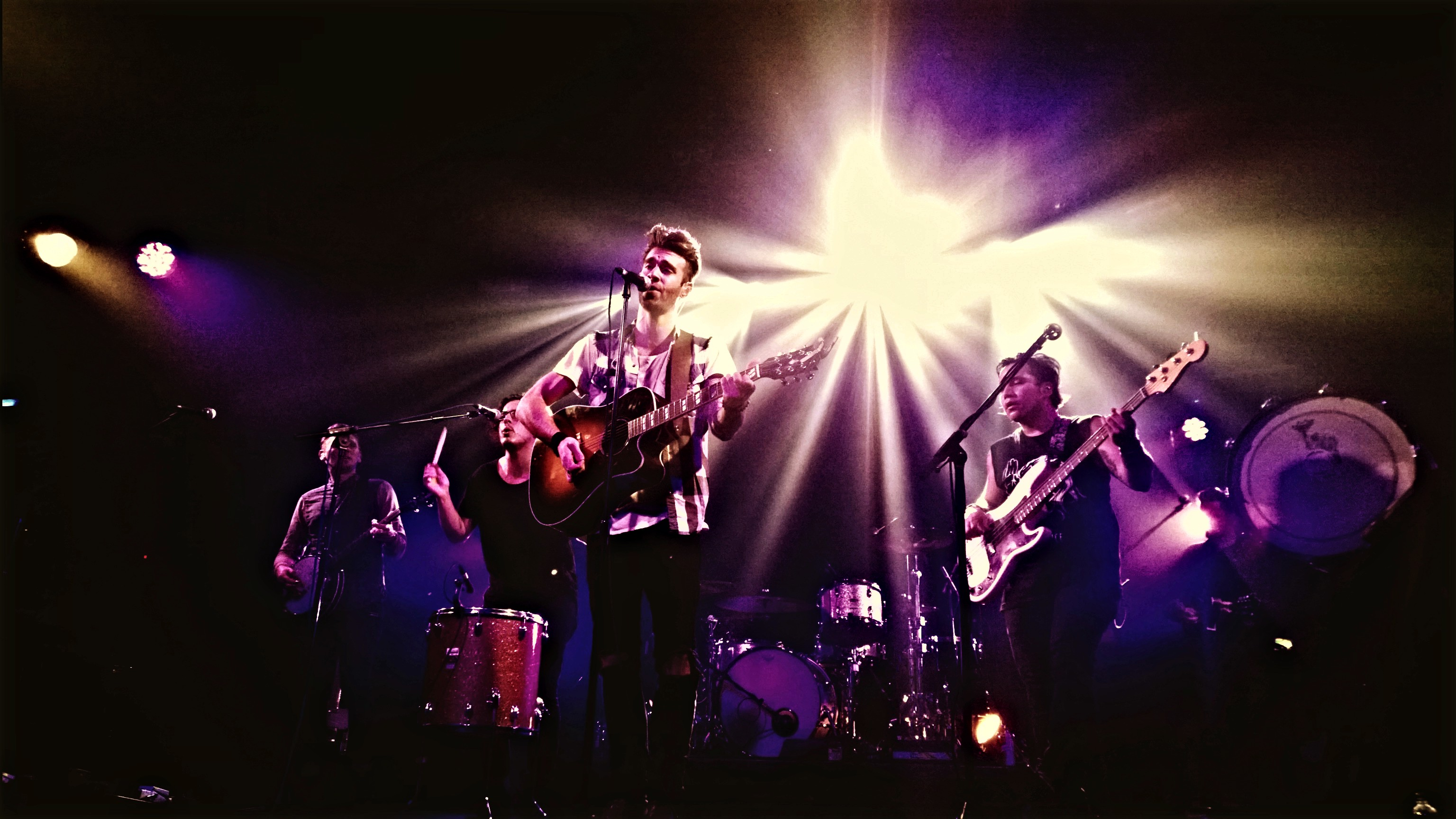
- American Authors performing at London's nightclub Heaven in November 2014
- Studio albums: 5
- EPs: 7
- Singles: 16
- Music videos: 19
- Promotional singles: 8

New York-based rock band American Authors have released 5 studio albums, 7 EPs, and 16 singles, 8 of which were promotional singles, in their 13-year tenure as a band. Their discography also includes 19 music videos, 3 headlining tours, and three supporting tours for OneRepublic, the Fray, and the Revivalists respectively.

The band's first EP and first two studio albums recorded under the name American Authors have been major label releases on Universal Music Group subsidiary, Island Records. However, much of the band's early material was released independently under the name the Blue Pages.

== Albums ==
=== Studio albums ===
List of studio albums, with selected details, chart positions, and certifications
Title	Details	Peak chart positions							Certifications	Sales
Title	Details	US	US Rock	AUS	AUT	CAN	GER	UK	Certifications	Sales
Oh, What a Life	Released: March 3, 2014; Label: Island, Dirty Canvas; Formats: CD, digital download, streaming	15	3	35	58	12	68	26	RIAA: Gold; MC: Gold	US: 115,000
What We Live For	Released: July 1, 2016; Label: Island, Dirty Canvas; Formats: CD, digital download, streaming	60	6	—	—	—	—	—		
Seasons	Released: February 1, 2019; Label: Island, Dirty Canvas; Formats: CD, digital download, LP, streaming	—	—	—	—	—	—	—		
Best Night of My Life	Released: February 10, 2023; Label: French Poet Society; Formats: CD, LP, digital download, streaming	—	—	—	—	—	—	—		
Call Your Mother	Released: October 18, 2024; Label: French Poet Society; Formats: LP, digital download, streaming	—	—	—	—	—	—	—		
"—" denotes a recording that did not chart or was not released in that territory.

== Extended plays ==
=== As the Blue Pages ===
List of extended plays, with selected details and chart positions
Title and details	Track listing
Surrounded by Wolves: Released: 2007; Label: N/A	No. / Title / Length; 1. / "Speed of Light" / 3:30; 2. / "It's a Shame" / 4:08; 3. / "10 Years Behind" / 3:27; 4. / "Love Like This" / 4:11
Bear Fight: Released: January 20, 2009; Label: Walking City	No. / Title / Length; 1. / "Away Away" / 3:51; 2. / "4 Out of 10" / 3:50; 3. / "Better Times" / 4:31; 4. / "Loverboy" (single) / 3:27; 5. / "There Will Be Blood" (feat. Kyle Patrick) / 4:19
Night Hawke: Released: 2010; Label: Walking City	No. / Title / Length; 1. / "That 850"; 2. / "Lil' Mama"; 3. / "Slow Down" / 3:30; 4. / "Breaking Me"; 5. / "True Blood"; 6. / "Say It Again"
Anthropology: Released: February 1, 2011; Label: C*Medice Productions	No. / Title / Length; 1. / "Run Back Home" (single) / 3:45; 2. / "Love You Fear" / 4:09; 3. / "Best I Could Do" / 3:08; 4. / "Keep Me Dreaming" (single) / 4:10; 5. / "Fight for You" / 3:33
Rich with Love: Released: December 22, 2012; Label: C*Medice Productions	No. / Title / Length; 1. / "Rich with Love" / 3:26; 2. / "Lonely Life" / 3:32; 3. / "Tell Me How You Feel" / 4:01; 4. / "All in the Fire" / 3:30; 5. / "Couldn't Get It Right" / 4:22; 6. / "Time and Time Again" / 3:54

=== As American Authors ===
Title	Details	Peak chart positions	
Title	Details	US	US Rock
American Authors	Released: August 27, 2013; Label: Island, Dirty Canvas; Formats: digital download	156	42
Counting Down	Released: September 18, 2020; Label: Island, Universal Music Group; Formats: digital download, streaming	—	—
"—" denotes a recording that did not chart or was not released in that territory.

== Singles ==
=== As lead artist ===
==== 2010s ====
List of singles, with selected chart positions and certifications, showing year released and album name
Title	Year	Peak chart positions										Certifications	Album
Title	Year	US	US Adult	US Rock	AUS	AUT	CAN	GER	NZ	SWE	UK	Certifications	Album
"Believer"	2013	— (Note: "Believer" did not enter the Billboard Hot 100, but peaked at number 21 on the Bubbling Under Hot 100 Singles chart, which acts as a quasi-extension to the Hot 100.)	12	12	—	—	—	—	—	—	—	RIAA: Gold	Oh, What a Life
"Best Day of My Life"	2013	11	1	2	10	20	5	34	13	10	17	RIAA: 6× Platinum; ARIA: 4× Platinum; BPI: 2× Platinum; BVMI: Platinum; GLF: 3× Platinum; MC: 7× Platinum	Oh, What a Life
"Luck"	2014	—	—	—	—	—	—	—	—	—	—		Oh, What a Life
"In a Big Country"	2014	—	—	—	—	—	—	—	—	—	—		Non-album single
"Go Big or Go Home"	2015	—	22	20	—	—	—	—	—	—	—	RIAA: Gold	What We Live For
"Pride"	2015	—	29	33	—	—	—	—	—	—	—		What We Live For
"What We Live For"	2016	—	26	40	—	—	—	—	—	—	—		What We Live For
"I'm Born to Run"	2017	—	—	—	—	—	—	—	—	—	—	RIAA: Gold	What We Live For
"Everything Everything"	2017	—	—	—	—	—	—	—	—	—	—		Born in China
"Good Ol' Boys" (with Gazzo)	2017	—	—	—	—	—	—	—	—	—	—		Non-album singles
"Do My Own Thing"	2018	—	—	—	—	—	—	—	—	—	—		Non-album singles
"Deep Water"	2018	—	—	—	—	—	—	—	—	—	—		Seasons
"Say Amen" (featuring Billy Raffoul)	2018	—	—	—	—	—	—	—	—	—	—		Seasons
"Bring It On Home" (original or featuring Phillip Phillips and Maddie Poppe)	2019	—	34	—	—	—	—	—	—	—	—		Seasons
"—" denotes a recording that did not chart or was not released in that territory.

==== 2020s ====
List of singles, with selected chart positions and certifications, showing year released and album name
Title	Year	Peak chart positions		Album
Title	Year	US Adult	US AC	Album
"Microphone"	2020	—	—	Counting Down
"Best I Can" (with Seeb)	2020	—	—	Counting Down
"Brick by Brick"	2020	—	—	Counting Down
"Counting Down"	2020	—	—	Counting Down
"Nice and Easy" (featuring Mark McGrath of Sugar Ray)	2021	23	—	Non-album singles
"Favorite Time of the Year"	2021	—	—	Non-album singles
"Timeless" (with Chad Tepper)	2022	—	—	Non-album singles
"One Way Up" (with Fedde Le Grand)	2022	—	—	Non-album singles
"Good 4 U" (Olivia Rodrigo cover)	2022	—	—	Non-album singles
"Circles" (Post Malone cover)	2022	—	—	Non-album singles
"Blind for Love"	2022	20	26	Best Night of My Life
"Christmas Karaoke"	2022	—	—	Non-album singles
"Sleigh Ride" (Leroy Anderson and Mitchell Parish cover)	2022	—	—	Non-album singles
"Best Night of My Life"	2023	—	—	Best Night of My Life
"We Happy Don't Worry"	2023	—	—	Best Night of My Life
"Perfectly Imperfect" (featuring Billy Raffoul)	2023	—	—	Non-album singles
"Sweet Caroline" (Neil Diamond cover)	2023	—	—	Non-album singles
"Come Home to Me"	2023	—	—	Non-album singles
"Christmas in Hollis" (Run-DMC cover)	2023	—	—	Non-album singles
"My Last Dime"	2024	—	—	Call Your Mother
"Daisies"	2024	—	—	Call Your Mother
"Save Tonight" (Eagle-Eye Cherry cover)	2024	—	—	Call Your Mother
"Can't Stand the Mourning"	2024	—	—	Call Your Mother
"Something Amazing" (featuring Rozes)	2024	—	—	Call Your Mother
"Come Too Far"	2024	—	—	Call Your Mother
"Bon Voyage"	2024	—	—	Call Your Mother
"This Christmas Eve"	2024	—	—	Non-album single
"Tumble Down (The Whistle Song)"	2025	—	—	Voz Extraña
"This Little Light of Mine"	2025	—	—	Voz Extraña
"Race Car"	2025	—	—	Voz Extraña
"—" denotes a recording that did not chart or was not released in that territory.

=== As featured artist ===
Title	Year	Album
"Rocketman" (MAGIC GIANT featuring American Authors)	2019	Non-album single
"Move" (Santana featuring Rob Thomas and American Authors)	2021	Blessings and Miracles
"This Time Is Right" (CVBZ featuring American Authors)	2021	Non-album singles
"One Way Up" (Fedde Le Grand featuring American Authors)	2022	Non-album singles
"The Life That I Got" (Lit featuring American Authors)	2022	Tastes Like Gold
"Island in the Sun" (Smallpools featuring American Authors)	2023	Cameras & Coastlines & Covers
"The Best" (EDVN featuring American Authors)	2024	Non-album singles
"Love & Drugs" (teamwork. featuring Kiiara and American Authors)	2025	Non-album singles

=== Promotional singles ===
List of promotional singles, with selected chart positions, showing year released and album name
Title	Year	Peak chart positions	Album
Title	Year	US Rock	Album
"Trouble"	2014	44	Oh, What a Life
"Right Here Right Now"	2016	—	What We Live For
"I Wanna Go Out"	2017	—	Seasons
"Do My Own Thing"	2018	—	Non-album single
"Say Amen" (featuring Billy Raffoul)	2018	—	Seasons
"Neighborhood" (featuring Bear Rinehart of Needtobreathe)	2018	—	Seasons
"Stay Around"	2019	—	Seasons
"Champion" (featuring Beau Young Prince)	2019	—	Non-album single
"—" denotes a recording that did not chart or was not released in that territory.

== Music videos ==
=== As lead artist ===
List of music videos, showing year released and directors
Title	Year	Director(s)
"Believer" (Brooklyn version)	2013	Anthony Leonardi III and Brendan Walter
"Best Day of My Life" (Dog version)	2013	Joshua Mikel
"Best Day of My Life"	2013	Mark Staubach
"Believer"	2014	Anthony Leonardi III, Brendan Walter and Chris Newhard
"Luck"	2014	Taylor Cohen
"Go Big or Go Home"	2015	Ethan Lader
"Pride"	2015	Rosco Guerrero
"Pride" (radio mix / American sign language video)	2016	Brendan Walter and Mel Soria
"What We Live For"	2016	Rosco Guerrero
"I'm Born to Run"	2017	Jesse DeFlorio
"Everything Everything"	2017	
"Good Ol' Boys"	2017	
"Deep Water" (Viral)	2018	Harrison Sanborn
"Deep Water"	2018	Lauren Sick
"Say Amen"	2018	Jesse DeFlorio and Seth Iliff
"Neighborhood"	2018	Rosco Guerrero
"Stay Around"	2019	Spencer Kohn
"Calm Me Down"	2019	Rosco Guerrero
"Before I Go"	2019	Jesse DeFlorio
"Bring It On Home"	2019	
"Microphone"	2020	Spencer Kohn
"Brick by Brick"	2020	Orlando Romero
"Nice and Easy"	2021	Chris Greider
"Favorite Time of the Year"	2021	Duncan Hatch
"Timeless"	2022	Janush Libicki
"Blind for Love"	2022	Matt Sanchez and Bianca Magick
"Best Night of My Life"	2023	Chris Greider
"We Happy Don't Worry"	2023	Chris Greider

=== As featured artist ===
Title	Year	Director(s)
"Rocketman"	2019	Magic Giant
"Move"	2021	Joshua Mikel
"This Time Is Right"	2021	Matt Wilds

== Tours ==
- Three of Clubs Tour (2013)
- 13th Annual Honda Civic Tours (2014)
- What We Live For Europe Spring Tour (2017)
- Best Night Of My Life Tour (2023)
- Call Your Mother Tour (2024)

Co-headlining

- The Mighty O.A.R. Summer Tour (2019) (with O.A.R.)
- Band of Brothers Road Show (2020) (with Magic Giant)

Supporting

- Native Summer Tour (2014) (with OneRepublic)
- North America Tour (2016) (with the Fray)
- Take Good Care Tour (2019) (with the Revivalists)
- Where We Came From Tour (2022) (with Phillip Phillips)
