= 13th Annual Honda Civic Tours =

2014 concert tour

13th Annual Honda Civic Tour
- Tour by Honda Civic Tour
- Associated album: Spreading Rumours; Evil Friends; Oh, What a Life
- Start date: August 10, 2014
- Legs: 3
- Website: civictour.honda.com

Honda Civic Tour concert chronology
- 12th Annual Honda Civic Tour (2013); 13th Annual Honda Civic Tours (2014); On the Road Again Tour (2015)

The 13th Annual Honda Civic Tours was a concert tour that showcasing three distinct genres of music, as well as becoming a significant pillar of the new Honda Stage music platform. Alternative rock bands Grouplove and Portugal. The Man co-headlined the first tour which kicked off on August 10, 2014, in Seattle. This tour included support acts Typhoon and Tokyo Police Club on various dates. The second of three tours with Brooklyn-based pop/rock band American Authors began on October 1, 2014. Support for the second tour included Echosmith, The Mowgli's and Oh Honey on select dates. Additionally, Latin DJ trio 3BallMTY headlined the final tour of the series which began in mid-November and ran through December 21, 2014.

== Opening acts ==
- Typhoon (August 10, September 2–16)
- Tokyo Police Club (August 11–17)
- Echosmith (October 1–19)
- The Mowgli's (October 1 – November 11)
- Oh Honey (October 21 – November 11)

== Set list ==
=== Grouplove ===
1. "I'm With You"
2. "Itchin' on a Photograph"
3. "Lovely Cup"
4. "Raspberry"
5. "Shark Attack"
6. "Hippy Hill"
7. "Schoolboy"
8. "Tongue Tied"
9. "Drunk in Love" (Beyoncé cover)
10. "Bitin' the Bullet"
11. "Slow"
12. "Borderlines and Aliens"
13. "Ways to Go"
14. "Colours"

Encore

15. "Baba O'Riley" (The Who cover) (with Portugal. The Man)

=== American Authors ===
1. "Home"
2. "Heart of Stone"
3. "Believer"
4. "Luck"
5. "Ghost"
6. "Trouble"
7. "Yellow" (Coldplay cover)
8. "Think About It"
9. "Nothing Better"
10. "Love"
11. "Stay with Me" (Sam Smith cover)
12. "Hit It"
13. "Best Day of My Life"

Encore

14. "Keep Me Dreaming"
15. "Oh, What a Life"

== Tour dates ==
Date	City	Country	Venue
Grouplove & Portugal. The Man
August 10, 2014	Seattle	United States	Marymoor Park
August 11, 2014	Portland	United States	Edgefield
August 13, 2014	San Luis Obispo	United States	Avila Beach
August 15, 2014	Los Angeles	United States	Greek Theatre
August 16, 2014	Las Vegas	United States	Brooklyn Bowl
August 17, 2014	San Diego	United States	Open Air Theater
August 19, 2014	Salt Lake City	United States	Red Butte Garden and Arboretum
August 21, 2014	Morrison	United States	Red Rocks Amphitheatre
August 22, 2014	Council Bluffs	United States	Harrah's Council Bluffs
August 24, 2014	Milwaukee	United States	Eagles Ballroom
August 27, 2014	Des Moines	United States	Simon Estes
August 29, 2014	Kansas City	United States	Crossroads
August 30, 2014	Dallas	United States	South Side Ballroom
September 2, 2014	Atlanta	United States	Masquerade Music Park
September 3, 2014	Charlotte	United States	Uptown Amphitheatre
September 5, 2014	Cincinnati	United States	Horseshoe Casino
September 10, 2014	Columbus	United States	LC Pavilion
September 12, 2014	Columbia	United States	Merriweather Post Pavilion
September 14, 2014	Boston	United States	Blue Hills Bank Pavilion
September 16, 2014	New York City	United States	Rumsey Playfield
American Authors
October 1, 2014	Reno	United States	Knitting Factory
October 2, 2014	San Diego	United States	House of Blues
October 3, 2014	Santa Ana	United States	The Observatory
October 4, 2014	Los Angeles	United States	Club Nokia L.A. Live
October 5, 2014	Santa Cruz	United States	The Catalyst
October 7, 2014	Portland	United States	Wonder Ballroom
October 9, 2014	Seattle	United States	Showbox at the Market
October 10, 2014	Spokane	United States	Knitting Factory
October 11, 2014	Boise	United States	Knitting Factory
October 13, 2014	Salt Lake City	United States	The Depot
October 14, 2014	Denver	United States	Ogden Theatre
October 16, 2014	Kansas City	United States	Uptown Theater
October 17, 2014	Dallas	United States	Granada Theater
October 18, 2014	Houston	United States	Warehouse Live – Ballroom
October 19, 2014	Austin	United States	Mohawk
October 21, 2014	Tallahassee	United States	The Moon
October 22, 2014	Orlando	United States	The Beacham
October 23, 2014	Fort Lauderdale	United States	Revolution Live
October 24, 2014	St. Petersburg	United States	Jannus Live
October 25, 2014	Atlanta	United States	Buckhead Theatre
October 27, 2014	Indianapolis	United States	Deluxe @ Old National Centre
October 28, 2014	Pontiac	United States	The Crofoot
October 29, 2014	Chicago	United States	Metro
October 31, 2014	Minneapolis	United States	Mill City Nights
November 2, 2014	Columbus	United States	Newport Music Hall
November 3, 2014	Buffalo	United States	The Waiting Room
November 4, 2014	Boston	United States	Paradise Rock Club
November 6, 2014	Pittsburgh	United States	Stage AE
November 7, 2014	New York City	United States	Best Buy Theater
November 8, 2014	Philadelphia	United States	Trocadero
November 10, 2014	Washington, D.C.	United States	9:30 Club
November 11, 2014	New Haven	United States	Toad's Place
