= What We Live For =

Studio album by American Authors
- Released: July 1, 2016
- Recorded: 2014–16
- Genres: Indie rock; alternative rock; pop rock
- Length: 42:21
- Label: Island
- Producers: Aaron Accetta; Shep Goodman; Frequency

American Authors chronology
Oh, What a Life (2014)	What We Live For (2016)	Seasons (2019)

Singles from What We Live For
- 1. "Go Big or Go Home" Released: May 18, 2015; 2. "Pride" Released: December 11, 2015; 3. "What We Live For" Released: April 1, 2016; 4. "I'm Born to Run" Released: February 14, 2017

What We Live For is the second studio album by American pop rock band American Authors, produced by returning collaborators Aaron Accetta and Shep Goodman. Running at 42 minutes and comprising twelve tracks, the album was released worldwide by Island Records on July 1, 2016. The album marks the third major release by the band under the American Authors moniker, and largely continues the sound of their debut album, Oh, What a Life.

What We Live For was a critical and commercial success debuting at number 60 on the Billboard 200 and spawned four singles: "Go Big or Go Home", "Pride", "What We Live For" and "I'm Born to Run". To promote the album, the band went on a U.S. tour to promote the record ahead of its release.

== Background and recording ==
We’re really feeling the pressure of, ‘OK, how do we take what people know and love about us from the first album, but really give it where we’re at today and kind of take it to the next level, for who we are as people, and who we are as musicians right now'

— Frontman Zac Barnett, discussing feelings about the band's second album.

In March 2014, American Authors released their debut studio album, Oh, What a Life, after many years releasing extended plays under the moniker The Blue Pages. American Authors enjoyed considerable success with the album, gaining significant exposure, especially through adult contemporary radio. Their success is largely due to the commercial boom of their hit single, "Best Day of My Life", which by April 2015 had been certified 3× Platinum by the Recording Industry Association of America, marking sales exceeding three million. Drummer Matt Sanchez described the band's achievements; "truthfully, most people don’t realize we’ve been a band for about eight years, so success seems like it’s come in marathon form and we still got a long way to go." Heading into the creative process for their follow-up album, the band expressed a preference to preserve most of the sound that made "Best Day of My Life" and Oh, What a Life commercially successful, but with a more mature feel, citing the need to reflect the growth of the band as artists.

Songwriting and early recording sessions for the band's follow-up to Oh, What a Life began as early as on tour in 2014. While serving as a supporting act on the Native Summer Tour, the band entertained the idea of co-writing a song with OneRepublic's frontman Ryan Tedder, hoping to add what American Authors frontman Zac Barnett as "the Ryan Tedder touch". The band continued to write and record new songs for the album during their time on the 13th Annual Honda Civic Tours and tours throughout 2015, with some songs even being premiered and exercised live in their tours, such as "Nothing Better" and "Pride". (Note: Citations for live performances of "Nothing Better" and "Pride") Principal recording commenced in early to mid 2015, and was primarily recorded with producers Aaron Accetta and Shep Goodman, who had previously worked with the band on their eponymous extended play and Oh, What a Life. While the band had an extensive set of songs at the beginning of the sessions, enough to create an album outright, the band exercised their material and continued to write and record new songs well into 2016.

== Composition ==
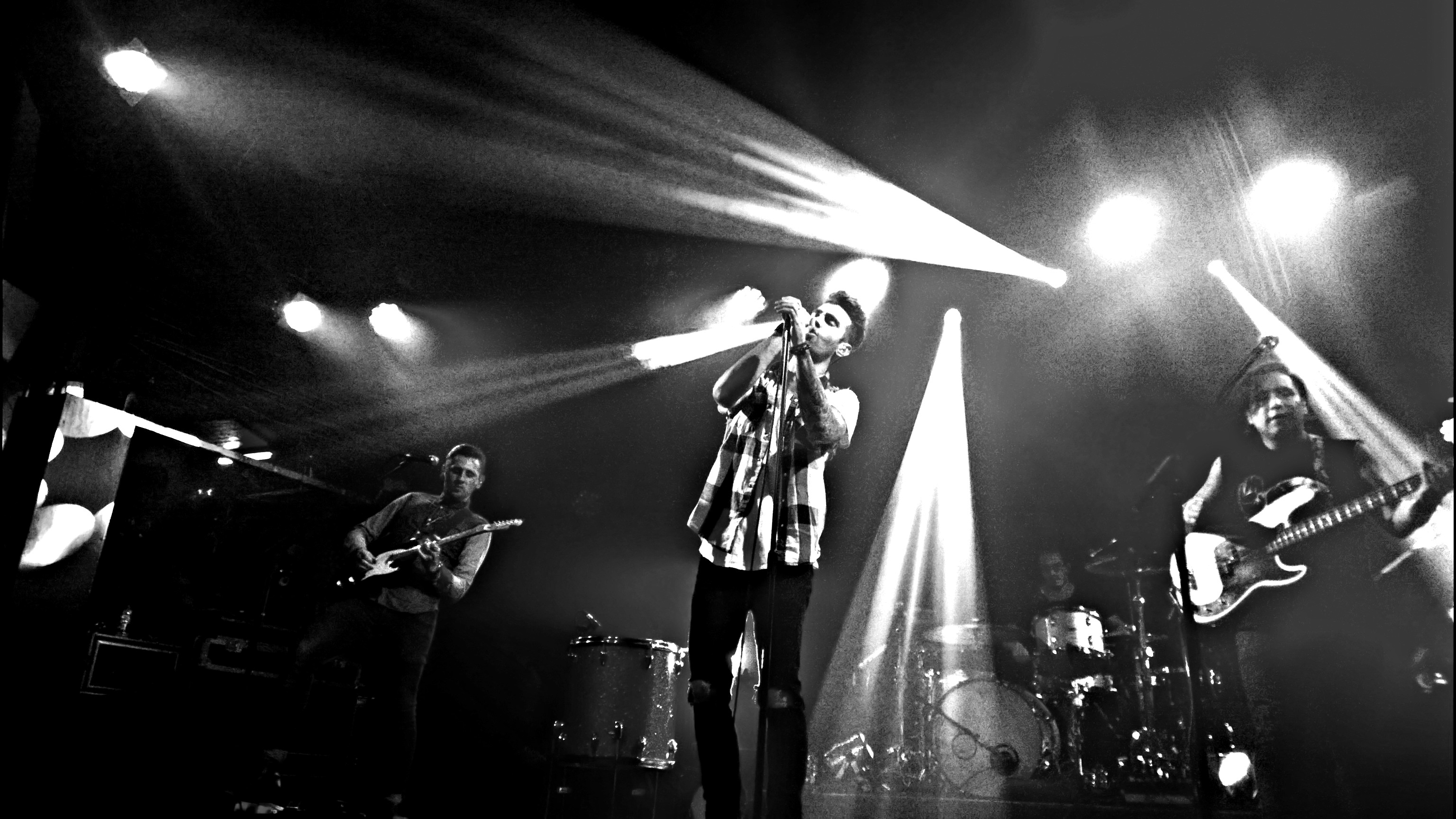
The album features biographical themes concerning the band's perspective on their present and future. (Pictured: American Authors performing in November 2014)

What We Live For largely continues the sound of the band's debut studio album, Oh, What a Life. Lead singer Zac Barnett stated that "we tried to take a lot of the stuff that our fans like and love about us from Oh, What a Life and take that to the next level as far as sounds go. [We] brought back some of the old instruments like mandolin and banjo, but also experimented with a lot of different sounds like vocal samples. We brought back a lot of piano [and] bigger harmonies." Lyrically, the album builds on Oh, What a Life's biographical themes, which followed the band's origins and journey; What We Live For documents the band's experiences during the present and their perspective on the future.

== Promotion ==
"Go Big or Go Home", which would ultimately appear as the seventh track on the final album, was released in May 2015 as a single, after the band's last single promoting Oh, What a Life, "Luck", was released a year previously. "Pride" also appeared on a single in December 2015, and was also solicited as a promotional single to United States adult contemporary radio thereafter. What We Live For was officially unveiled by the band and Island Records on March 2, 2016, with pre-orders for both a digital download and compact disc version of the album being made available the same day. The album's opening two tracks, "What We Live For" and "I'm Born to Run" were also made available to purchase in April 2016, on the album's page on iTunes. Supporting the album, the band embarked on a 19-date tour of the United States from March through to May 2015, performing songs appearing on the new album live, in the lead-up to its release. It was announced through the band's Facebook page that the album's release date was pushed nearly two months from their original date, saying they are "putting the finishing touches" on their album and planned to release new music videos before their album was available in stores.

== Critical reception ==
Professional ratings
Review scores
Source	Rating
AllMusic	3.5/5 stars

What We Live For received generally positive reviews from critics. Neil Yeung writing for AllMusic remarked of the album: “The sophomore set from New York-based American Authors doesn't stray too far from their debut Oh, What a Life, but they make up for the lack of freshness with scope.”

== Soundtrack appearances ==
- "Go Big or Go Home" was featured in NBA videos showing highlights from the 2015 playoffs.
- "Right Here Right Now" is featured on EA Sports game, Madden NFL 17.
- "What We Live For" was featured in 2016 World Cup of Hockey video packages.

== Track listing ==
No.	Title	Writer(s)	Length
1.	"What We Live For"	Zachary Michael Barnett; Benjamin Harris Berger; Ryan David Vincent McMahon; David M. Rublin; Matthew John Sanchez; James Adam Shelley (Note: The writing credits attributed to "What We Live For", "Right Here Right Now", "Nothing Better", and "Go Big or Go Home" are sourced from the American Society of Composers, Authors and Publishers' songwriting credits database, which can be found at this link.)	2:58
2.	"I'm Born to Run"	Barnett; Kevin Fisher; Rublin; Sanchez; Shelley (Note: The writing credits attributed to "I'm Born to Run", "Pride", "Replaced", "Mess with your Heart", "No Love", "Pocket Full of Gold", "Superman" and "Mind Body Soul" are sourced from the All Music' songwriting credits database, which can be found at this link.)	3:26
3.	"Pride"	Aaron Accetta; Barnett; Shep Goodman; Rublin; Sanchez; Shelley	3:11
4.	"Right Here Right Now"	Barnett; Berger; McMahon; Ryan Rabin; Rublin; Sanchez; Shelley	3:01
5.	"Nothing Better"	Accetta; Barnett; Goodman; Rublin; Sanchez; Shelley	3:38
6.	"Replaced"	Accetta; Barnett; Goodman; Rublin; Sanchez; Shelley	3:32
7.	"Go Big or Go Home"	Accetta; Barnett; Jonnie Davis; Goodman; Rublin; Sanchez; Shelley	2:49
8.	"Mess with Your Heart"	Accetta; Barnett; Goodman; Rublin; Sanchez; Shelley	4:03
9.	"No Love"	Accetta; Barnett; Goodman; Rublin; Sanchez; Shelley	3:33
10.	"Pocket Full of Gold"	Accetta; Barnett; Goodman; Rublin; Sanchez; Shelley	3:00
11.	"Superman"	Accetta; Barnett; Goodman; Rublin; Sanchez; Shelley	4:08
12.	"Mind Body Soul"	Barnett; Rublin; Sanchez; Shelley	5:02
Total length:			42:21

== Personnel ==
American Authors

- Zac Barnett – lead vocals, guitar
- James Adam Shelley – lead guitar, banjo, mandolin
- Dave Rublin – bass, keyboard
- Matt Sanchez – drums, percussion

Production

- Aaron Accetta – producer
- Shep Goodman – producer
- Frequency – producer of "Mess With Your Heart"

== Charts ==
Album
Chart (2016)	Peak position
US Billboard 200	60
US Digital Albums (Billboard)	10
US Top Rock Albums (Billboard)	6
US Top Alternative Albums (Billboard)	6

"What We Live For"
Chart (2016)	Peak position
US Hot Rock & Alternative Songs (Billboard)	40
US Adult Pop Airplay (Billboard)	26

== Release history ==
Region	Date	Label	Format	Catalog no.
Australia	July 1, 2016	Island	Digital download	—N/a
France	July 1, 2016	Island	Digital download	—N/a
United Kingdom	July 1, 2016	Island	Digital download	—N/a
United States (Note: Citations for United States release of What We Live For: Compact Disc, Digital)	July 1, 2016	Island	CD; digital download	SUK 5093901 (CD)
