= Pride (American Authors song) =

Single by American Authors

from the album What We Live For
- Released: December 11, 2015
- Recorded: 2014–15
- Genre: Indie rock; pop rock
- Length: 3:11
- Label: Island
- Songwriters: Aaron Accetta; Zachary Barnett; Shep Goodman; David Rublin; Matthew Sanchez; James Shelley
- Producers: Aaron Accetta; Shep Goodman

American Authors singles chronology
"Go Big or Go Home" (2015)	"Pride" (2015)	"What We Live For" (2016)

Music video
- "Pride" on YouTube

"Pride" is a song by American indie rock band American Authors. The song was written by band members Zachary Barnett, David Rublin, Matthew Sanchez and James Shelley with producers Aaron Accetta and Shep Goodman. The track was released by Mercury Records and Island Records as second single from their second album What We Live For.

== Promotion ==
After the huge success achieved with their latest single "Go Big or Go Home", American Authors returned with the awaited follow-up. "Pride" was released on digital retailers on December 11, 2015 via Island Records as the second single band's upcoming second studio album and follow-up to 2014's debut Oh, What a Life. The music video directed by Rosco Guerrero and filmed in Denver was premiered through Vevo later the same day of its release. "Pride" was written by Zachary Barnett, Matt Sanchez, James Adam Shelley, Shep Goodman, Aaron Accetta and Dave Rublin. A special American sign language video to support the radio mix version of the single was premiered through Vevo on March 11, 2016. It was directed by Brendan Walter and Mel Soria.

== Track listing ==
Digital download
No.	Title	Length
1.	"Pride"	3:11

== Charts ==
Chart (2015)	Peak position
US Hot Rock & Alternative Songs (Billboard)	33
US Adult Pop Airplay (Billboard)	29
US Rock Digital Songs (Billboard)	16
