= Best Night of My Life (American Authors album) =

Studio album by American Authors
- Released: February 10, 2023
- Studio: Mono Studio (Nashville), Zac's Living Room (Las Vegas), Arcade Studios New York City
- Genre: Alternative
- Length: 27:19
- Label: French Poet Society
- Producer: Matt Sanchez, American Authors, Gregg Wattenberg, Benzi

American Authors chronology
Seasons (2019)	Best Night of My Life (2023)	Call Your Mother (2024)

Singles from Best Night of My Life
- 1. "Blind For Love" Released: September 30, 2022; 2. "Best Night of My Life" Released: January 13, 2023; 3. "We Happy Don’t Worry" Released: February 3, 2023

Best Night of My Life is the fourth studio album by American pop rock band American Authors, primarily produced by the band’s own Matt Sanchez. Running at 27 minutes and comprising ten tracks, the album was released worldwide independently on February 10, 2023.

Best Night of My Life featured three singles, "Blind for Love", which reached No. 20 on the Adult Pop Airplay chart, "Best Night of My Life", and "We Happy Don't Worry". The band went on a tour in 2023 to promote the album, dubbed the Best Night of My Life Tour.

== Background and recording ==
We wanted to take it back and make the most American Authors sounding album we've ever done. We really wanted to go back to the roots and make something that would almost sound nostalgic to listeners. We want listeners to go, 'I love American Authors. I've heard their songs in TV commercials and at sporting events all over the place. I missed this sound.'

— Frontman Zac Barnett, discussing feelings about the band's fourth album.

On April 23, 2021, American Authors announced that they would be parting ways with former band member, James Adam Shelly. Later that year, they also left Island Records and started releasing music independently. Throughout the next two years, the band would release several collaborations and covers.

Nearly one decade after the release of their hit single, "Best Day of My Life", the band wanted to go back to their roots with their fourth album. During the COVID-19 pandemic, the band started doing writing retreats, where they would write together for an extended period of time, around the clock. With Best Night of My Life, the band came to Las Vegas and wrote and recorded twenty songs within the period of two weeks, and narrowed it down to the ten that were featured on the record.

== Composition ==
Sonically, Best Night of My Life continues the band’s style of pop from their original debut album, Oh, What a Life (album), and other music released by American Authors over the years. Lyrically, the album aims to be an optimistic album which builds on the themes of previous American Authors songs and records.

The sixth track “Live On” was written in memory of Rublin’s sister who passed away in December 2019.

== Promotion ==
“Blind For Love,” which was released on September 30, 2022, as an EP with 5 remixes, served as the lead single of this album. Additionally, a music video was released on November 28, 2022. The song ended up being positioned as Track 5 on the album.

In early 2023, the second single and title track, “Best Night of My Life” was released on January 13, 2023, along with the album announcement. The music video was released on YouTube on January 20th, 2023, which was designed as a sequel to the smash hit Best Day of My Life. The third and final single, “We Happy Don’t Worry” was released on February 3, 2023, with the official music video dropping later that day.

The album was released on February 10, 2023 and was promoted by the “Best Night of My Life” tour, which began that night and lasted until March 13, 2023. The band continued to promote the album through social media and with a live performance on the Today (American TV program) show.

== Track listing ==
All tracks are written by Dave Rublin, Matt Sanchez, Zac Barnett.

No.	Title	Writer(s)	Producer(s)	Length
1.	"Best Night of My Life"	Dave Rublin; Matt Sanchez; Zac Barnett	Matt Sanchez; American Authors	2:58
2.	"We Happy Don’t Worry"	Benzi Edelson; Bobby McFerrin; Rublin; Gregg Wattenberg; Sanchez; Barnett	Gregg Wattenberg; Benzi	2:30
3.	"One Step Back"	Rublin; Sanchez; Barnett	Sanchez; American Authors	2:26
4.	"Same Bed"	Rublin; Sanchez; Barnett	Sanchez; American Authors	2:55
5.	"Blind For Love"	Rublin; Sanchez; Barnett	Sanchez; American Authors	2:53
6.	"Live On"	Rublin; Sanchez; Barnett	Sanchez; American Authors	2:32
7.	"All Roads Lead to You"	Rublin; Sanchez; Barnett	Sanchez; American Authors	3:08
8.	"Good Times"	Rublin; Sanchez; Barnett	Sanchez; American Authors	2:24
9.	"Madness"	Rublin; Sanchez; Barnett	Sanchez; American Authors	2:54
10.	"Movin’ On"	Rublin; Sanchez; Barnett	Sanchez; American Authors	2:57
Total length:				27:19

== Personnel ==
American Authors

- Zac Barnett – lead vocals, guitar, banjo, mandolin
- Dave Rublin — vocals, bass, guitar, ukulele mandolin
- Matt Sanchez — vocals, drums, percussion, keyboards, guitar, whistles

Production

- Matt Sanchez — producer
- American Authors — producer
- Gregg Wattenberg – producer of “We Happy Don’t Worry”
- Benzi — producer of “We Happy Don’t Worry”

== Release history ==
Region	Date	Label	Format	Ref.
Various	February 13, 2023	French Poet Society	Digital download; streaming	
Various	2023	French Poet Society	CD; vinyl	
