= Trouble (American Authors song) =

Promotional single by American Authors

from the album Oh, What a Life
- Released: February 18, 2014
- Recorded: 2012–13
- Genre: Folk rock
- Length: 3:15
- Label: Island
- Songwriter(s): Aaron Accetta; Zachary Barnett; Shep Goodman; David Rublin; Matthew Sanchez; James Shelley
- Producer(s): Aaron Accetta; Shep Goodman

"Trouble" is a song by American pop rock band American Authors. The song was written by band members Zachary Barnett, David Rublin, Matthew Sanchez and James Shelley with producers Aaron Accetta and Shep Goodman and originally recorded for the band's debut studio album Oh, What a Life, appearing as the fifth track on the album. The track was released by Mercury Records and Island Records as a promotional single on February 18, 2014.

== Composition ==
"Trouble" has been described as a folk rock song, borrowing musical elements from Mumford & Sons, The Lumineers and Edward Sharpe and the Magnetic Zeros. Driven by the banjo as the lead instrument in the song, the track makes use of the voices of all four band members to create a crowd-like cheer that is used in the song's chorus and latter verses, an effect similar to the one used in "Best Day of My Life".

== Reception ==
The song was well-received by some critics. Justin Stanford of music website Indie Trendsetters wrote that "It isn’t massive like "Best Day of My Life" but it is nice and low key, a little more intimate and personal. No doubt it is a buildup to something huge in their new album". Anna Murphy of music website Earmilk also wrote positively of the song, stating "this song will be a hit. Enjoy it in its first fresh week before it's making the rounds on syndicated airwaves & your little sister's surround sound".

The line "I knew she was trouble from the first kiss" indirectly refers to Taylor Swift's 2012 smash hit "I Knew You Were Trouble".

== Track listing ==
Digital download
No.	Title	Writer(s)	Producer(s)	Length
1.	"Trouble"	Aaron Accetta; Zachary Barnett; Shep Goodman; David Rublin; Matthew Sanchez; James Shelley	Accetta; Goodman	3:15

== Personnel ==
Adapted from Oh, What a Life liner notes.

American Authors

- Zac Barnett – lead vocals, guitar
- James Adam Shelley – lead guitar, banjo
- Dave Rublin – bass
- Matt Sanchez – drums

Technical personnel

- Aaron Accetta – production
- Michael Goodman – production

== Charts ==
Chart (2014)	Peak position
US Hot Rock & Alternative Songs (Billboard)	44

== Release history ==
Country	Date	Format	Label
United Kingdom	February 18, 2014	Digital download	Island
United States	February 18, 2014	Digital download	Mercury
