= Best Kind of Mess =

Studio album by Get Scared
- Released: July 12, 2011
- Recorded: 2010–2011
- Genres: Post-hardcore; emo
- Length: 42:14
- Label: Universal Motown
- Producers: John Feldmann, Shep Goodman, Aaron Accetta

Get Scared chronology
Get Scared (2010)	Best Kind of Mess (2011)	Built for Blame, Laced With Shame (2012)

Singles from Best Kind of Mess
- 1. "Fail" Released: January 11, 2011; 2. "Sarcasm" Released: February 9, 2011; 3. "Whore" Released: June 27, 2011

Best Kind of Mess is the debut studio album by American post-hardcore band Get Scared, released on July 12, 2011 through Universal Motown Records. The album was preceded by singles "Fail", "Sarcasm" and "Whore". The album is a departure from the band's previous releases, which had more screaming and a dirtier sound to them. This is the band's only album released on Universal Motown.

== Overview ==
Best Kind of Mess is a departure from the band's previous releases, which had more screaming and a dirtier sound to them. Two songs from the Get Scared EP (Voodoo and Sarcasm) were included on the album. Best Kind of Mess was released on July 12, 2011. To promote the album, the band headlined the Fuck You All tour. Dr. Acula and Girl on Fire toured alongside the band.

Professional ratings
Review scores
Source	Rating
AllMusic	3.5/5 stars
Artistdirect	3.5/5 stars
LMP Magazine	8.5/10 stars

== Track listing ==
All tracks are written by Get Scared and John Feldmann.

No.	Title	Length
1.	"Scream"	3:39
2.	"Fail"	2:50
3.	"Mess"	4:03
4.	"Sarcasm" (featuring Craig Mabbitt, re-recorded from Cheap Tricks and Theatrics)	3:18
5.	"Whore"	2:56
6.	"Hurt"	4:00
7.	"Voodoo" (re-recorded from Cheap Tricks and Theatrics)	2:56
8.	"Wrong"	3:34
9.	"Moving"	3:36
10.	"Parade"	3:40
11.	"Hate"	3:45
12.	"Drown"	3:58
Total length:		42:14

== Personnel ==
Credits adapted from AllMusic.

Musicians

Get Scared

- Nicholas Matthews – lead vocals
- Johnny B – lead guitar, backing vocals
- Bradley Lloyd – rhythm guitar, bass, backing vocals
- Dan Juarez – drums, percussion

Additional musicians

- Craig Mabbitt – guest vocals on "Sarcasm"
- John Feldmann – backing vocals, percussion, string arrangements

Production

- Aaron Accetta – production, composer
- Fred Archambault – audio
- John Feldmann – production, additional production, composer, mixing, programming
- Seth Foster – mastering
- Joe Gastwirt – mastering
- Shep Goodman – A&R, production, composer
- Kevin Griffin – composer
- Jon Nicholson – drum technician
- Brandon Paddock – engineer
- Mikhail Pivovarov – assistant engineer
- Steve Poon – guitar technician
- Erik Ron – second engineer

== Chart positions ==
Chart (2011)	Peak position
US Top Heatseekers	21

== Release history ==
Region	Date	Label	Format	Ref
United States	July 12, 2011	CD, Digital download	B001133102	
