= Everyone's Out to Get Me =

Studio album by Get Scared
- Released: November 11, 2013
- Genre: Post-hardcore; emo
- Length: 42:48
- Label: Fearless Records
- Producer: Erik Ron

Get Scared chronology
Built for Blame, Laced With Shame (2012)	Everyone's Out to Get Me (2013)	Demons (2015)

Singles from Everyone's Out to Get Me
- 1. "At My Worst" Released: June 21, 2013; 2. "Told Ya So" Released: September 24, 2013; 3. "Badly Broken" Released: October 15, 2013

Everyone's Out to Get Me is the second studio album by American post-hardcore band Get Scared, released on November 11, 2013. It is the first release under their new label Fearless Records. The album was produced by Erik Ron, who also produced the band EP Built for Blame, Laced with Shame, and has worked with bands such as Panic! at the Disco, Foxy Shazam, Attaloss, Saosin, Allstar Weekend, and more. Alternative Press streamed their new album online on November 7. It is the first release from the band to feature original vocalist Nicholas Matthews since his departure in 2011 and return in late 2012; it is also the first to feature new rhythm guitarist Adam Virostko. The album debuted at No. 1 on the Billboard Heatseekers, selling 3,000 copies in its first week.

== Track listing ==
No.	Title	Length
1.	"Told Ya So"	3:31
2.	"For You"	3:40
3.	"My Nightmare"	3:54
4.	"Badly Broken"	3:23
5.	"At My Worst"	4:39
6.	"Get Out While You Can"	3:41
7.	"God Damn Liar"	3:09
8.	"Us In Motion"	4:02
9.	"Cunning, Not Convincing"	3:26
10.	"The Strangest Stranger"	3:36
11.	"Stumbling In Your Footsteps"	4:01
12.	"When We Were Strong"	3:46
Total length:		42:48

== Personnel ==
Get Scared

- Nicholas Matthews – lead vocals
- Jonathan "Johnny B" Braddock – lead guitar, backing vocals
- Bradley "Lloyd" Iverson – bass, backing vocals
- Dan Juarez – drums, percussion
- Adam Virostko – rhythm guitar

Additional

- Erik Ron – producer
- Ronnie Radke – co-writing on "For You"
