= Call Your Mother =

Call Your Mother may refer to:

- Call Your Mother (restaurant), American bagel and delicatessen chain
- Call Your Mother (TV series), American TV series
- Call Your Mother (album), American Authors album
