= Built for Blame, Laced with Shame =

EP by Get Scared
- Released: August 28, 2012
- Recorded: May–July 2012
- Genre: Post-hardcore; emo; alternative rock
- Length: 20:20
- Label: Grey Area
- Producer: Erik Ron

Get Scared chronology
Cheap Tricks and Theatrics B-Sides EP (2011)	Built for Blame, Laced with Shame (2012)	Everyone's Out to Get Me (2013)

Singles from Built for Blame, Laced with Shame
- 1. "Cynical Skin" Released: January 9, 2012; 2. "Built for Blame" Released: August 1, 2012; 3. "Don't You Dare Forget the Sun" Released: August 31, 2012

Built for Blame, Laced with Shame is the fourth and final EP by American post-hardcore band Get Scared, released on August 28, 2012, through Grey Area Records. The album was produced by Erik Ron. It is the only EP without lead vocalist Nicholas Matthews and the only album with Joel Faviere after Matthews departed in late 2011 but later rejoined the band in late 2012.

== Background ==
Since the release of their first studio album, Best Kind of Mess, the band had begun writing material for their tentative second studio album. However, in late 2011, lead vocalist Nick Matthews departed from group due to musical differences, later joining his now ex-wife in Blacklisted Me. The band announced they would hold auditions for a lead singer to give their fans a chance at the position, but later cancelled the auditions after ex-Woe, Is Me vocalist Tyler Carter introduced the band to former Dear Chandelier singer, Joel Faviere, who was later inducted into the band.

On January 9, the band released the track "Cynical Skin", the first release with Faviere, as a single. The track spawned mainly positive reactions from both critics and fans. It was later revealed that the single would be featured on Built for Blame, Laced With Shame. Faviere announced they were also working on a song titled "Equal to Bullets", but will instead be released on a full-length studio album.

The band entered the studio on May 23 to record what was originally thought to be their second studio album, but was later announced to be an EP. Erik Ron (Panic! at the Disco, VersaEmerge, Attaloss, I the Mighty) produced the EP and announced its release on a new label, Grey Area Records, which currently has Get Scared as its only band. Faviere commented on Erik Ron's invitation to produce the EP, "We quickly all became family, it was natural and it felt so much more personal to be with Erik and the Grey Area team".

On August 1, the band released another song from the EP titled "Built for Blame" on their YouTube page. Like Cynical Skin, the song received positive fan reactions. On the same day, the band announced the release date of Built for Blame, Laced With Shame, which is August 28, 2012. A tentative track listing was also revealed. On August 22, 2012, another new song was released from the EP titled "Problematic" on Altpress.

== Track listing ==
All tracks are written and performed by Get Scared.

No.	Title	Length
1.	"Built for Blame"	4:18
2.	"Problematic"	3:13
3.	"Cynical Skin"	3:10
4.	"Keep Myself Alive"	3:38
5.	"Start to Fall"	3:33
6.	"Don't You Dare Forget the Sun"	3:15
Total length:		20:20

Spotify bonus tracks
No.	Title	Length
7.	"Don't You Dare Forget the Sun (Acoustic)"	4:30
8.	"Cynical Skin (Acoustic)"	3:15
Total length:		27:50

== Personnel ==
Get Scared

- Joel Faviere – lead vocals
- Johnny B – lead guitar, backing vocals
- Bradley Lloyd – rhythm guitar, bass, backing vocals
- Dan Juarez – drums, percussion

== Release history ==
Region	Date	Label	Format
Worldwide	August 28, 2012	Grey Area Records	CD, digital download
