= Open Door (song) =

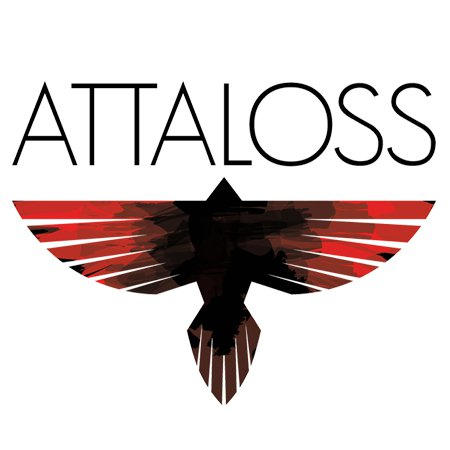

Single by Attaloss

from the album Attaloss
- Released: April 10, 2012
- Recorded: Winter 2011
- Genre: Alternative rock
- Length: 3:18 (Album version); 4:00 (Music video version)
- Label: Rock Ridge Music
- Songwriter(s): Attaloss, Erik Ron
- Producer(s): Erik Ron

"Open Door" is a song by American rock band Attaloss, released April 10, 2012 as the first single from the group's first album, Attaloss (2012).

== Music video ==
The video of "Open Door" was directed by Brian Henderson which was filmed at Big Bear Mountain, CA.

== Track listing ==
All tracks are written by Attaloss and Erik Ron

"Open Door" digital download
No.	Title	Length
1.	"Open Door"	3:18
Total length:		3:18
