= Go Big or Go Home (song) =

Single by American Authors

from the album What We Live For
- Released: May 18, 2015
- Recorded: 2014–15
- Genre: Pop rock; indie rock
- Length: 2:49
- Label: Island
- Songwriters: Aaron Accetta; Zachary Barnett; Jonnie Davis; Shep Goodman; David Rublin; Matthew Sanchez; James Shelley
- Producers: Aaron Accetta; Shep Goodman

American Authors singles chronology
"In a Big Country" (2014)	"Go Big or Go Home" (2015)	"Pride" (2015)

Music video
- "Go Big or Go Home" on YouTube

"Go Big or Go Home" is a song recorded by American pop rock band American Authors as the first single from their second studio album, What We Live For. The song was released on May 18, 2015.

The song received a Gold Certification by the RIAA in November 2025 alongside with “I’m, Born To Run” nearly ten years after its original release.

== Promotion ==
"Go Big or Go Home" was released on digital retailers on May 18, 2015. The new album is scheduled to be released later this year via Island Records. The official lyric video premiered via Vevo on June 27, 2015. The band filmed the proper music video directed by Ethan Lader, in late May and it was premiered on July 10, 2015. The single was written by Zachary Barnett, Matt Sanchez, James Adam Shelley, Shep Goodman, Aaron Accetta and Jonnie Davis.

== Usage in media ==
- The song was used in a promo for the 19th season of Bizarre Foods with Andrew Zimmern.
- The song is also used by CBS Sports in advertisements to promote their upcoming televised college football schedule.
- The song was used in the official trailer for Paramount's 2019 animated film, Wonder Park.

== Track listing ==
Digital download
No.	Title	Length
1.	"Go Big or Go Home"	2:49

Digital download – remix
No.	Title	Length
1.	"Go Big or Go Home" (Taylor Wise remix)	4:14

== Charts ==
=== Weekly charts ===
Chart (2015)	Peak position
US Hot Rock & Alternative Songs (Billboard)	20
US Adult Pop Airplay (Billboard)	22

=== Year-end charts ===
Chart (2015)	Position
US Hot Rock Songs (Billboard)	72

== Certifications ==
Region	Certification	Certified units/sales
United States (RIAA)	Gold	500,000^{‡}
^{‡} Sales+streaming figures based on certification alone.
