= My Forever =

Studio album by He Is We
- Released: December 11, 2010
- Recorded: 2010
- Genre: Indie pop, pop rock
- Label: Universal Motown
- Producer: Aaron Sprinkle, Aaron Accetta, Shep Goodman Casey Bates

He Is We chronology
My Forever (2010)	Skip to the Good Part

My Forever is the debut studio album by the indie pop band He Is We. It also features guest vocals from Aaron Gillespie.

== Critical reception ==
Professional ratings
Review scores
Source	Rating
AbsolutePunk	89%
AllMusic	3.5/5 stars
Alter the Press	4/5 stars
Review Rinse Repeat	3.5/5 stars
Sound Alarm	8.5/10 stars

Corey Apar of AllMusic said He is We "set the bar pretty high on their debut album", praising Rachel Taylor's vocals and the "simple pop music" replete "with sweet melody after sweet melody", but stated that "the music retains enough indie sensibility throughout to appeal to an audience wider than just the emo-pop crowd", highlighting the tracks "Everything You Do" and "Happily Ever After".

== Track listing ==
No.	Title	Length
1.	"Forever and Ever"	4:01
2.	"All About Us" (feat. Aaron Gillespie)	3:26
3.	"Everything You Do"	4:11
4.	"And Run"	3:42
5.	"Happily Ever After"	4:04
6.	"Kiss It All Better"	4:05
7.	"Prove You Wrong"	3:26
8.	"Blame It on the Rain"	3:07
9.	"Love Life"	3:32
10.	"Fall"	3:39
Total length:		37:13

== Charts ==
Chart (2010)	Peak position
US Heatseekers Albums	6
