= Demons (Get Scared album) =

Studio album by Get Scared
- Released: October 30, 2015
- Recorded: 2015
- Studios: Grey Area Studios, North Hollywood, California
- Genre: Post-hardcore
- Length: 40:25
- Label: Fearless
- Producer: Erik Ron

Get Scared chronology
Everyone's Out to Get Me (2013)	Demons (2015)	The Dead Days (2019)

Singles from Demons
- 1. "Buried Alive" Released: September 4, 2015; 2. "Suffer" Released: October 2, 2015; 3. "R.I.P" Released: October 23, 2015

Demons is the third album by the American post-hardcore band Get Scared, released on October 30, 2015, via Fearless Records. The album marks shift in style from previous releases, reported to be either more pop-oriented or harder and darker.

Demons was produced with Erik Ron who also worked with the band on Everyone's Out to Get Me and Built for Blame, Laced with Shame and received positive reviews upon release.

== Reception ==
New Noise Magazine gave the album a positive review and said "Get Scared has always been one of those bands that deserved way more credit than they were given". Shania Gassner of Strife Magazine gave a positive review and said "the album is very emotional and helps the band as well as the fans to deal with their problems". The album has a four and a half star rating from AllMusic.

== Track listing ==
All tracks are written by Get Scared.

No.	Title	Length
1.	"Buried Alive"	3:02
2.	"Suffer"	3:37
3.	"Addict"	3:23
4.	"Under My Skin"	3:38
5.	"Demons"	4:19
6.	"The Devil's In The Details"	3:38
7.	"What If I'm Right"	4:03
8.	"Take a Bow"	4:04
9.	"Relax, Relapse"	3:02
10.	"Second Guessing"	4:04
11.	"R.I.P."	3:35
Total length:		40:25

== Personnel ==
Credits adapted from album booklet.

Get Scared

- Nicholas Matthews – lead vocals
- Jonathan "Johnny B" Braddock – lead guitar, backing vocals
- Bradley "Lloyd" Iverson – bass, backing vocals
- Dan Juarez – drums, percussion
- Adam Virostko – rhythm guitar

Production

- Erik Ron – producer
- Anthony Reeder – engineer
- Bryce Umbel – assistant engineer
- Tim Beken – assistant engineer
- Taylor Larson – mixing, mastering
- Sal Torres – A&R
- Jon Cottam – album artwork
