= Get Scared (EP) =

EP by Get Scared
- Released: November 9, 2010
- Genre: Post-hardcore, emo
- Length: 9:37
- Label: Universal Motown

Get Scared chronology
Cheap Tricks and Theatrics (2009)	Get Scared (2010)	Best Kind of Mess (2011)

Singles from Get Scared
- 1. "Sarcasm" Released: February 9, 2011

Get Scared is the second EP by American post-hardcore band Get Scared, released on November 9, 2010, on Amazon and iTunes as a digital download only. Two of the songs from the EP, "Sarcasm" and "Voodoo", were re-released on Get Scared's debut album Best Kind of Mess. The third song, "Deepest Cut", is exclusive to this EP only.

== Reception ==
Erik Rojas from The Sound Alarm site gave the EP a 7.5/10 rating stating that, "This three song EP is overall solid, and it blends many forms of music together, to create a diverse sound, which can be hard to find in today's scene." Metal Odyssey reviewed the EP stating, "It's the multi-combination of this band's aggressive Hard Rock moments, moxie, unbridled relevance, harmonious vocals and the unfailing melodic nature of these three songs that makes this EP and Get Scared notably memorable" giving it a positive 4/5 rating. Cyndi Jo of Hardrock Haven gave another positive rating of 8/10 stating, "The songs are solid with elements of post-hardcore with the screamo-whatever-core that fans have maintained popular. As far as guitar work and hard hitting vocal tactics go, it's there, but it's definitely time for the whole thing."

== Track listing ==
No.	Title	Length
1.	"Sarcasm" (featuring Craig Mabbit)	3:20
2.	"Voodoo"	2:56
3.	"Deepest Cut"	3:21
Total length:		9:37

== Personnel ==
Get Scared

- Nicholas Matthews – lead vocals
- Jonathan "Johnny B" Braddock – lead guitar and bass
- Bradley "Lloyd" Iverson – rhythm guitar
- Dan Juarez – drums, percussion

Additional

- Craig Mabbit – guest vocals on "Sarcasm"
- Erik Ron – engineer
