= Believer (American Authors song) =

Single by American Authors

from the album Oh, What a Life
- Released: March 19, 2013
- Genre: Pop
- Length: 3:03
- Label: Mercury; Island
- Songwriter(s): Aaron Accetta; Zachary Barnett; Shep Goodman; David Rublin; Matthew Sanchez; James Shelley
- Producer(s): Aaron Accetta; Shep Goodman

American Authors singles chronology
"Believer" (2013)	"Best Day of My Life" (2013)

Music video
- "Believer" on YouTube

"Believer" is the debut single by American indie rock band American Authors. The song was written by band members Zac Barnett, Dave Rublin, Matt Sanchez, and James Adam Shelley, along with producers Aaron Accetta and Shep Goodman. "Believer" first appeared on their 2013 American Authors EP and was released as the band's debut single on March 19, 2013; it was later included on their debut studio album, Oh, What a Life (2014).

== Release ==
"Believer" was initially released for digital download as American Author’s debut single on March 19, 2013. It was released to US Triple-A radio on April 1, 2013 and to US modern rock radio the following day. On May 12, 2014, the song was released to US hot adult contemporary radio, and a month later, it was re-released to US modern rock radio. A remix of the song by Dutch DJ Tiësto was issued as a digital single on July 22, 2014. The song impacted US contemporary hit radio on September 2. There is an accompanying music video that shows two boys working together to build a time machine

== Track listing ==
Digital download

1. "Believer" – 3:04

Digital download (remix)

1. "Believer" (Tiësto Remix) – 3:35

== Personnel ==
Adapted from Oh, What a Life liner notes.

American Authors

- Zac Barnett – lead vocals, guitar
- James Adam Shelley – lead guitar, banjo, backing vocals
- Dave Rublin – bass guitar, backing vocals
- Matt Sanchez – drums, backing vocals

Technical personnel

- Aaron Accetta – production
- Michael Goodman – production

== Charts ==
=== Weekly charts ===
Chart (2014)	Peak position
US Bubbling Under Hot 100 Singles (Billboard)	21
US Hot Rock & Alternative Songs (Billboard)	12
US Adult Contemporary (Billboard)	20
US Adult Pop Airplay (Billboard)	12

=== Year-end charts ===
Chart (2014)	Position
US Hot Rock Songs (Billboard)	46
US Adult Top 40 (Billboard)	43

== Certifications ==
Region	Certification	Certified units/sales
United States (RIAA)	Gold	500,000^{‡}
^{‡} Sales+streaming figures based on certification alone.

== Release history ==
Country	Date	Format	Label	Ref.
Canada	March 19, 2013	Digital download	Mercury	
United States	March 19, 2013	Digital download	Mercury	
United States	April 1, 2013	Adult album alternative radio	Mercury; Island Def Jam	
United States	April 2, 2013	Modern rock radio	Mercury; Island Def Jam	
United States	May 12, 2014	Hot adult contemporary radio	Mercury; Island Def Jam	
United States	June 10, 2014	Modern rock radio	Mercury; Island Def Jam	
Canada	July 22, 2014	Digital download (Tiësto remix)	Island	
United States	July 22, 2014	Digital download (Tiësto remix)	Island	
United States	September 2, 2014	Contemporary hit radio	Mercury; Island Def Jam	
