= Attaloss (album) =

ATTALOSS
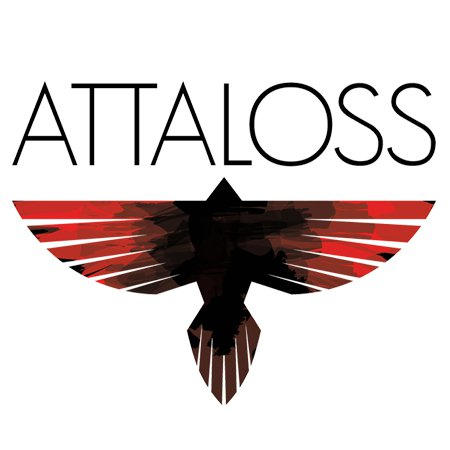

Studio album by Attaloss
- Released: (United States) April 10, 2012
- Recorded: Grey Area, North Hollywood, California (2011)
- Genre: Alternative rock
- Length: 35:26
- Label: Rock Ridge Music
- Producer: Erik Ron

Singles from ATTALOSS
- 1. "Open Door" Released: 2012

Professional ratings
Review scores
Source	Rating
Celebrity Cafe	4/5 stars
jitZu	4/5 stars

ATTALOSS is the first full-length album from the alternative rock band Attaloss, which was released by Rock Ridge Music/Warner Music Group/ADA. The self-titled debut hit number one on the Billboard Alternative New Artists chart, number five on the Billboard Heatseekers chart, number 38 on the Billboard Current Alternative Albums chart, and number 42 on the Billboard Indie chart. The album also cracked the Billboard 200 sales chart. The first single, "Open Door" is at alternative specialty radio with airplay at WEND (Charlotte), KPNT (St. Louis) and KCXX (Riverside), among others.

== Track listing ==
All songs by Attaloss

No.	Title	Length
1.	"Open Door"	3:18
2.	"Before You Let Me In"	3:44
3.	"Fate Will Only Know Tomorrow"	3:35
4.	"Move On"	2:59
5.	"Forward"	3:15
6.	"Open Door (Acoustic)"	3:25
7.	"Before You Let Me In (Acoustic)"	3:55
8.	"Fate Will Only Know Tomorrow (Acoustic)"	3:54
9.	"Move On (Acoustic)"	3:26
10.	"Forward (Acoustic)"	3:35

== Personnel ==
- Danny Aguiluz – vocals
- Lorenzo Perea – bass
- Chris Johansen – lead guitar
- Matt Geronimo – guitar, vocals
- Dakota Clark – drums
- Erik Ron – production, mixing, engineering
- Jens Funke – production
