= Mill City Nights =

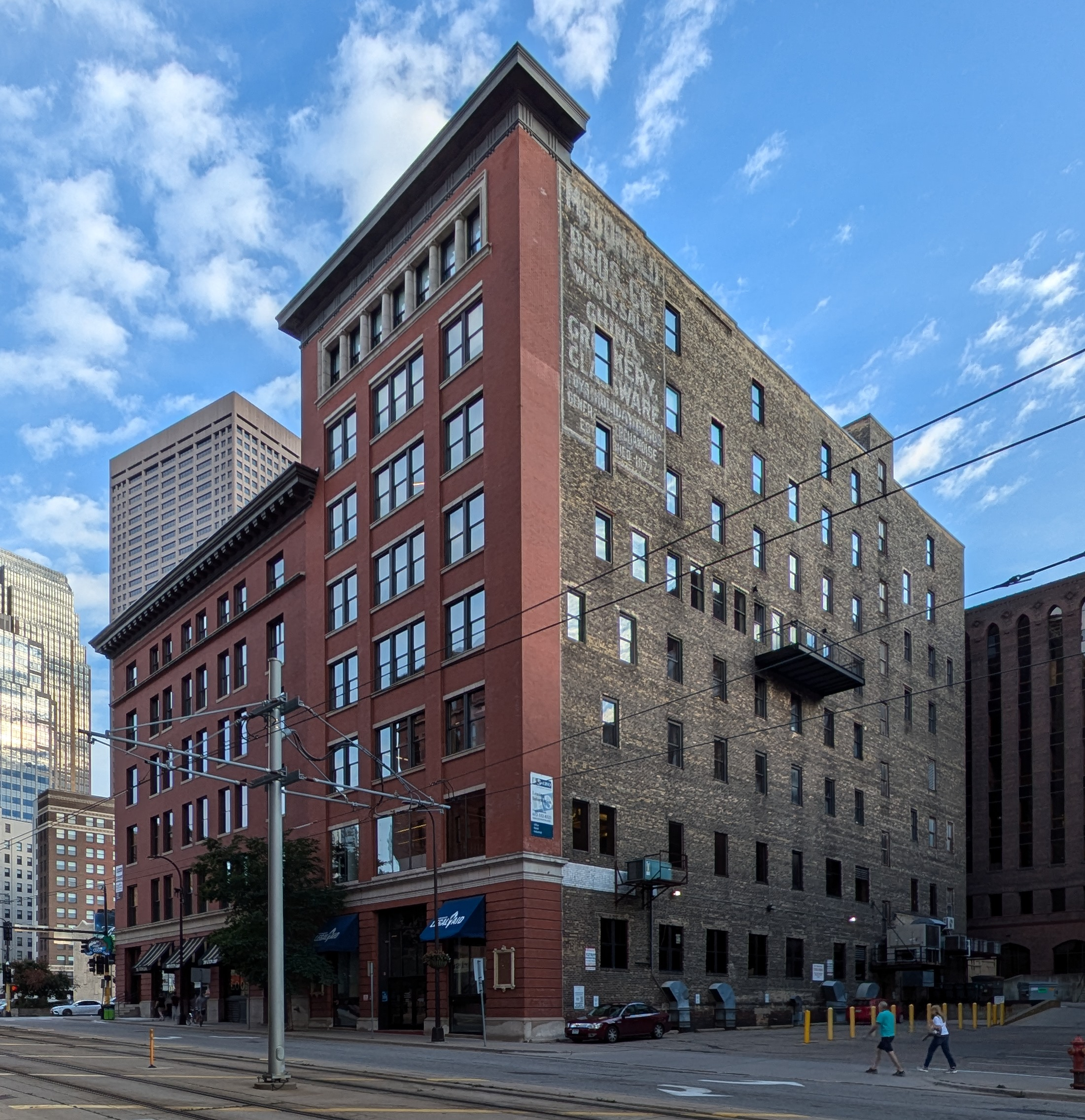
- 111 N 5th St, former location of Mill City Nights, pictured in 2024
- Interactive map of Mill City Nights
- Former names: The Brick (2012)
- Address: 111 5th St N Minneapolis, MN 55403
- Coordinates: 44°58′50″N 93°16′28″W
- Owner: AEG
- Capacity: 1,200
- Events: music, concerts

Construction
- Opened: March 19, 2012
- Closed: November 30, 2016

Website
- Venue Website

Mill City Nights (formerly known as The Brick) was a concert venue in downtown Minneapolis, Minnesota, United States, with a capacity of about 1200 that opened in 2012 and was operated by AEG Live.

It had no affiliation with the Mill City Museum or Mill City Live. Many national acts that are too small to pack an entire stadium came to Mill City Nights, including Cole Swindell, Eric Paslay, and Dan + Shay.

The venue had a partnership with AXS TV and several concerts were featured on AXSLive. The first act was Seether who performed on October 16, 2012.

The venue went out of business and closed its doors permanently on November 30, 2016, citing the high cost of rent. AEG is no longer operating the venue but there are reports of it reopening as MPLS Music Hall.

== Bars ==
There were three full-service bars located in Mill City Nights, with one being located on each level. The featured bar was The Nether Bar which is located in the basement. The Nether Bar could in itself be a separate venue, featuring live music for local up and coming bands, or could be used as a place for ticket holders to grab drinks before and after shows in the main room.

== MPLS Music Hall ==
In December of 2016, speculation ran wild as two acts were billed to appear at a mysterious new venue. It began its first major run of shows in September of 2017, as Damian Marley took the stage.

As of January 2, 2021 it’s questionable that this place has been open since 2018, as its website is no longer up and its social media has not posted anything since 2018. As of 2022 Google Maps reports it to be permanently closed.
