= Aaron Accetta =

- Born: May 11, 1971 (age 54)
- Origin: Mount Kisco, New York, United States
- Genres: Pop, R&B, dance-pop, electropop, pop rock
- Occupations: Musician, record producer, songwriter
- Years active: 2000–present
- Website: accetta.com

Aaron Accetta is an American New York–based multi-platinum record producer, songwriter, and musician. He is currently co-owner of Dirty Canvas Music, a full scale music production company focused on artist development. The first artist signed to Dirty Canvas was Brooklyn based alt rock band American Authors in 2011, who received a joint record deal with Island Records in 2012. Subsequent acts signed to Dirty Canvas include Young Rising Sons in early 2014, who received a joint record deal with Interscope records on June 17, 2014 and The Karma Killers.

Accetta has written and/or produced for such names as He is We, Forever The Sickest Kids, James Garfunkel, Brooke Hogan, Deborah Gibson, Jordan Knight, Rich Cronin, LFO, Keke Palmer, Aaron Carter, Nick Carter, and Jeff Timmons.

Born and raised in Bedford Hills, NY, a small town outside of New York City, Accetta began his music career at the early age of fourteen; writing his first song on his Fender Stratocaster. As a high school freshman, Aaron joined his first band, Perceptions, with Paul Tomassi, Stuart Ploss, Neil Minsky, and David Lay Williams. Also around this time, he recorded a single, "Mind Games," with Connecticut singer, Vinnie Macchio. By age sixteen, he started another band called, The Fuse.

After The Fuse parted ways, Accetta and lead vocalist, Dan Woods, put their efforts towards a new project: JBender, a melodic, hook-driven rock band produced by Sam Hollander. In February 2001, the band signed a major recording contract with Columbia Records. The band was later dropped in 2002.

Accetta began focusing solely on his producing and songwriting career after the fall of JBender. In 2002, he teamed up with pop artist, Mandy Ventrice, and began co-writing with the likes of Shep Goodman, Kenny Gioia, and Sam Hollander.

In 2003, Accetta was offered an in-house producer and songwriting position for Trans Continental Records based out of Orlando, FL. Shortly after, his credibility as a producer and songwriter grew tremendously; earning him rave reviews in Billboard Magazine, and an RIAA Certified Gold Record commemorating the sales of his production on Aaron Carter's single, Saturday Night.

== Selected discography ==
Year	Artist	Album	Song(s)	Credit	Record labels	Notes
2014	Young Rising Sons	High (Single)		Producer	Dirty Canvas Music	
2014	Brick+Mortar	Locked in a Cage (Single)		Composer	Anchor & Hope Music	"Locked in a Cage" reached #36 on Billboard Alternative Songs
2014	American Authors	Oh, What a Life	Entire album	Composer, Executive Producer, Mixing, producer, Vocals (Background)	Mercury Records	Oh, What a Life peaked at #15 on The Billboard 200
2014	American Authors	Best Day of My Life (Single)		Composer, engineer, Mixing, producer	Mercury Records	RIAA: Platinum, ARIA: Gold, MC: Platinum
2014	Bayside	Cult	Entire album	Producer	Hopeless Records	
2013	American Authors	American Authors (EP)	Entire album	Composer, engineer, Mixing, producer	Island Records	
2012	Lions Lions	To Carve Our Names	Entire album	Composer, producer	Hollywood Waste Records	
2011	Forever the Sickest Kids	Forever the Sickest Kids	Entire album	Mixing, producer, Programming	Universal Motown Records	
2011	Four Year Strong	In Some Way, Shape or Form	Entire album	Engineer, producer	Universal Motown Records	
2011	Get Scared	Best Kind of Mess	Entire album	Composer, producer	Universal Motown Records	
2011	He Is We	My Forever	Entire album	Guitar, Mixing, producer, Programming	Universal Motown Records	My Forever reached #33 on The Billboard 200
2009	Brooke Hogan	The Redemption	Entire album	Composer	Fontana Records	The Redemption debuted at number 144 on the Billboard 200
2006	Jordan Knight	Love Songs	"I Wish" "Say Goodbye" (coproduced by Jeff Timmons) "Where is Your Heart Tonight" (coproduced by Jeff Timmons) "No More Tears" (coproduced by Jeff Timmons)	Cowriter, Producer, Engineer, Guitarist, Programming	Trans Continental Records	The single "Say Goodbye" reached #24 in the US Billboard Adult Contemporary Chart.
2005	Aaron Carter	Saturday Night (Single)		Bass, Drums, engineer, Guitar, producer, Programming	Madacy	RIAA: Gold
2001	LFO	Life Is Good	Entire album	Guitarist	J Records	Life Is Good reached #75 on The Billboard 200.
