= Get Scared =

American rock band

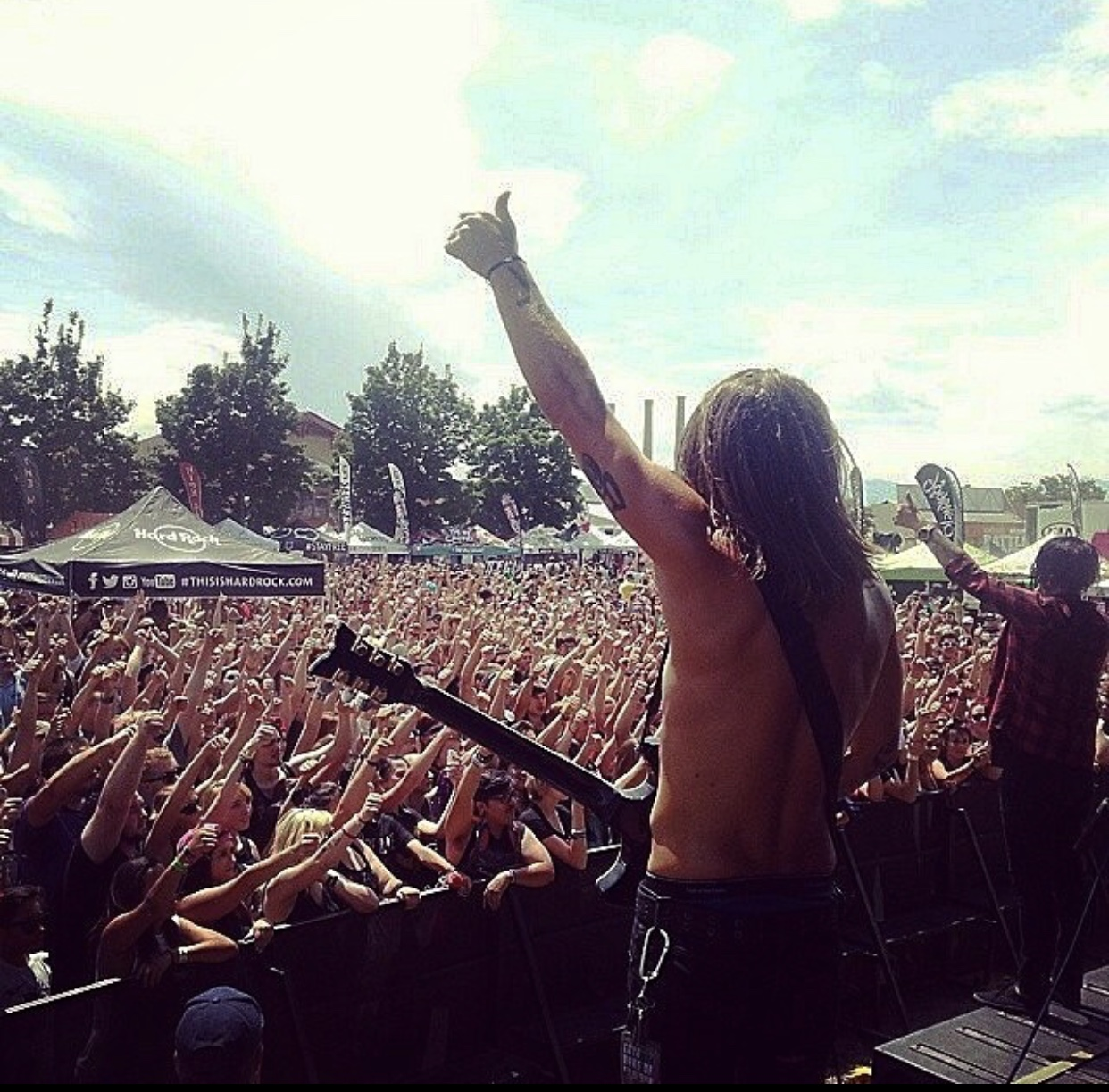
- Get Scared performing at the Warped Tour in Utah, 2014

Background information
- Origin: Layton, Utah, U.S.
- Genres: Post-hardcore; alternative rock; alternative metal; emo
- Years active: 2008–2019; 2022–present
- Labels: Fearless; Grey Area; Universal Motown
- Members: Nicholas Matthews; Johnny Braddock; Bradley "Lloyd" Iverson; Dan Juarez; Adam Virostko
- Past members: Warren Wilcock; Joel Faviere

Get Scared is an American rock band from Layton, Utah, formed in 2008. After their formation they released their first EP Cheap Tricks and Theatrics in 2009. A self-titled EP followed several months later in 2010. The band's debut studio album, Best Kind of Mess, was released in July 2011. Following Nicholas Matthews' first departure to join Blacklisted Me, the band released Cheap Tricks and Theatrics B-Sides in December 2011 without any previous announcements. Matthews was replaced by Joel Faviere near the end of 2011. The band's third EP and first with Faviere, Built for Blame, Laced With Shame, was released in 2012; Faviere was kicked out a few months after the EP's release when Matthews rejoined the band. Following Matthews' comeback, the band signed with Fearless Records and released their second full-length album, Everyone's Out to Get Me, in 2013. The band's third studio album, Demons, was released in 2015, and marked a departure from the band's post-hardcore sound featured on Built for Blame and Everyone's Out to Get Me in favor of a more polished production. Their fourth and final album, The Dead Days, was released in 2019 amidst a hiatus; it was later stated by vocalist Nicholas Matthews that the band had broken up due to multiple issues between the band members. Though the band announced a reunion in 2022, plans initially seemed to fall through; however in 2025 they stated that they had been writing new music since then.

== History ==
=== Early years, Best Kind of Mess and Built for Blame, Laced With Shame (2008–2013) ===
Before forming the band, Nicholas Matthews, Johnny Braddock, Bradley Iverson and Warren Wilcock were all in separate bands. The four came together to form the band and self-released their first EP, Cheap Tricks and Theatrics.

During summer 2010, the band went on Hot Topic's Sacred Ceremony tour with Black Veil Brides and Vampires Everywhere!, helping promote the band's music. The band then embarked on several tours, notably the first leg of The Dead Masquerade Tour (with Escape the Fate, Alesana, Drive A and Motionless in White) from January to March 2011 and an Aiden headliner including Eyes Set To Kill, Dr. Acula, Vampires Everywhere!, and Escape the Fate (only certain dates) in the spring of 2011. On July 12, 2011, they released their debut full-length album Best Kind of Mess, their first release through Universal Motown Records featuring mastered remakes of the songs "Setting Yourself Up for Sarcasm" and "If She Only Knew Voodoo Like I Do" with the shortened names "Sarcasm" and "Voodoo", with the remake of "Sarcasm" featuring Escape the Fate vocalist Craig Mabbit. The band embarked on the Fuck You All Tour with Dr. Acula and Girl On Fire in support of the album.

On November 30, 2011, the band announced that Matthews was leaving the band. They stated that Matthews wanted to pursue more options in his musical career with Blacklisted Me and that it was a surprise to the entire band. The band postponed any touring dates until further notice due to the sudden departure and lack of a lead vocalist. In the same message, they also announced that they would be holding auditions for lead vocalist.

The band re-entered the studio with the new lead vocalist on December 28. Although it was not officially announced who the new vocalist was, at the time there was much speculation that former Dear Chandelier singer Joel Faviere replaced Matthews, due to the tweets sent by Faviere and some of the members of Get Scared on Twitter. It was later made official that Faviere was the new lead vocalist. The team also welcomed new guitarist Adam Virostko to the band that following September 2012 to play The Pizza Party Tour with Dead Rabbits. Virostko became a permanent member that fall being formally announced on November 21, 2012. Faviere was the singer of the band for a short time until the return of Matthews on November 19, 2012. Only one EP, Built for Blame, Laced With Shame, was released during Faviere's tenure with the band.

=== Everyone's Out To Get Me (2013–2014) ===
On June 5, 2013, Get Scared announced their signing with Fearless Records and confirmed that their second studio album was coming later in the year. On June 21, they released a new song entitled, "At My Worst" on YouTube. Another song leaked on Twitter before any announcement had been made about a new album and was titled, "For You"; initially thought to be lost, it was revealed months later that it will appear on the new album.

On September 18, the band announced that their second studio album would be titled Everyone's Out To Get Me, and it would be released on November 11 via Fearless. Along with the announcement, they revealed the track list and also released a short preview of a new song, "Told Ya So". The full song was released on September 24.

On January 1, 2014, Fearless Records released a video on their page on YouTube announcing bands that will be releasing albums in 2014; they announced in the video that Get Scared would appear on the compilation Punk Goes 90s Vol. 2 with their cover of Lit's "My Own Worst Enemy".

=== Demons, The Dead Days and break-up (2015–2019) ===
The band announced their third studio album, Demons on September 3, 2015, along with the release of lead single "Buried Alive". A second single, titled "Suffer" was released on October 2. On October 22, a third single, "R.I.P." was released on iTunes and the new Apple Music. The album was officially released on October 30, 2015. To promote the album the band embarked on New Years Day's The Other Side Tour and all but three dates of I See Stars' Light In The Cave Tour in October 2015 and February 2016, respectively. The band also had a short headlining tour in Mexico and performances at Scream Out Festival in Japan and the South By So What Festival in Texas to support the album.

The band entered the studio in November 2017 with producer Kris Crummett to record their fourth studio album. The album had a tentative release date of 2018, but it did not come to pass. On January 9, 2019, guitarist Johnny Braddock announced the band was on a hiatus as vocalist Nicholas Matthews recovers from a heroin addiction. Several days later, Matthews announced he had left the band.

On April 10, 2019, Johnny Braddock announced The Dead Days would be released on April 19, 2019. On September 15, 2019, Nicholas Matthews posted an explanation video; after someone asked in the comments if the band had broken up, Matthews stated "unfortunately that is correct". He then went on to state

I know it's upsetting, you have no idea how hard it's been for me to accept. Especially because I had no choice in any of it. None of our band did, except for Johnny. He's got all of the log ins to all of our social media, bank account, phone bills, YouTube. Literally everything. Which is why I had to make an entirely new YouTube even to post this video. It's also the only reason why he was able to take complete control over Get Scared's fate and decide exactly what fans should and shouldn't hear. He then started using all of the accounts for get scared as his own personal promoting setting for his new solo album without any of us having any ounce of say or control over anything he has been posting about it. Everything he said about me, and Get scared was entirely done on his own without consulting any of us in the band before hand. There was a motive behind everything that he did. Which was to end get scared on his own recognizance to break off from us, and use get scareds success to promote his new solo career. (Which he has used my own personal templates to help create some of his songs) And as much as he wants to act like that's not true, I've got me and the rest of my band who can vouch for that. I've been texting him/calling him for almost an entire year now and he refuses to respond. So that's kind of an overview which still doesn't go into everything else he's done or is doing.

— Nicholas Matthews

=== Reunion (2022–present) ===
On April 1, 2022, the band made a post on their official Facebook and YouTube pages, hinting to a reunion.

It's been a while..somethings may or may not be happening BTS until further updates, Nick is on the front page of Cameo.. that's pretty damn cool go check it out

— Nicholas Matthews

A few months after this, on October 21, 2022, Matthews posted this to his Instagram page, hinting at Get Scared's final end.

"I'm no longer trying to mend Get Scared, nor am I their scapegoat. I've tried for years to keep Get Scared going, and the truth is it has nothing to do with me. I had my issues, but real brothers love you enough to help."

— Nicholas Matthews

However, on January 1, 2025, rhythm guitarist Adam Virostko stated that the band had been writing new music since a few years prior, and that "wheels have been turning and we've all been talking". After posting a teaser through Instagram stories on March 4, the band announced the following day that a reunion performance had been scheduled for the Aftershock Festival on October 3, 2025.

== Band members ==
Current

- Nicholas Matthews – lead vocals (2008–2011, 2012–2019, 2022–present)
- Johnny Braddock – lead guitar, backing vocals (2008–2019, 2022–present), bass (2008–2012)
- Bradley "Lloyd" Iverson – bass, backing vocals (2008–2019, 2022–present), rhythm guitar (2008–2012)
- Dan Juarez – drums, percussion (2009–2019, 2022–present)
- Adam Virostko – rhythm guitar (2012–2019, 2022–present)

Former

- Warren Wilcock – drums, percussion (2008–2009)
- Joel Faviere – lead vocals (2011–2012)

Touring

- Logan V – bass (2009)
- TJ Bell – bass (2011–2012)
- Matthew Nanes – bass (2025)

Timeline

== Discography ==
Studio albums

- Best Kind of Mess (2011)
- Everyone's Out to Get Me (2013)
- Demons (2015)
- The Dead Days (2019)

EPs

- Cheap Tricks and Theatrics (2009)
- Get Scared (2010)
- Cheap Tricks and Theatrics: B-Sides (2011)
- Built for Blame, Laced with Shame (2012)

Singles

- "Sarcasm" (2011)
- "Fail" (2011)
- "Whore" (2011)
- "Cynical Skin" (2012)
- "Built for Blame" (2012)
- "Don't You Dare Forget the Sun" (2012)
- "At My Worst" (2013)
- "Told Ya So" (2013)
- "Badly Broken" (2013)
- "My Own Worst Enemy" (2014)
- "Buried Alive" (2015)
- "Suffer" (2015)
- "R.I.P" (2015)

Music videos

- "If Only She Knew Voodoo Like I Do" (2009)
- "Sarcasm" (2011)
- "Don't You Dare Forget The Sun" (2012)
- "Badly Broken" (2013)
- "Buried Alive" (2015)
- "Suffer" (2015)
- "R.I.P" (2016)

== See also ==
- List of post-hardcore bands
- List of Utah musical groups
- Music of Utah
