= Billy Raffoul =

Canadian singer-songwriter

- Born: Leamington, Ontario, Canada
- Genre: Rock
- Occupation: Musician
- Instrument: Vocals
- Years active: 2018–present
- Website: billyraffoul.com

Billy Raffoul is a Canadian rock singer-songwriter from Leamington, Ontario, most noted as the winner of the 2021 SOCAN Songwriting Prize for his single "Western Skies".

The son of musician Jody Raffoul, he was introduced to the music business after accompanying his father on a session to perform on some Kid Rock demos in 2013, during which the producers invited him to perform vocals after hearing his singing voice. He signed to Interscope Records in 2017, releasing several EPs and performing as a guest vocalist on Avicii's song "You Be Love", before releasing his full-length debut album, International Hotel, in 2020.

In 2023, he participated in an all-star recording of Serena Ryder's song "What I Wouldn't Do", which was released as a charity single to benefit Kids Help Phone's Feel Out Loud campaign for youth mental health.

== Discography ==
EPs

- 1975 (2018)
- The Running Wild (2019)
- A Few More Hours at YYZ (2020)
- Born to Die with JJ Wilde (2021)
- I Wish You Were Here (2023)

Studio albums

- International Hotel (2020)
- Olympus (2021)
- For All These Years (2023)
- Billy Raffoul (2025)
- When I Cross the River (2025)

Live albums

- Live in June (2019)
- Live at Seacliff Park '25 (2026)
