= He Is We =

American indie pop band

- Origin: Tacoma, Washington
- Genre: Indie pop
- Years active: 2008–2014, 2016–present
- Labels: Universal Motown; Republic; InVogue; 16 Entertainment
- Members: Rachel Taylor
- Past members: Trevor Kelly; Stevie Scott (tour only); Wes Chamberlain (bass) (touring); Ben McBride (drums) (touring); Adam Mitchell (guitar) (touring)
- Website: https://www.facebook.com/heiswe.official/

He Is We is an American indie pop act formed in Tacoma, Washington, in 2008 by singer Rachel Taylor and guitarist Trevor Kelly, with Taylor being the sole constant member.

== Career ==
=== 2008–2011: Formation and early years ===
"The name He is We comes from the idea that Christ is in all of us", Trevor explains in an interview by Indievision Music. Previously the meaning was incorrectly stated as being about local bands with cocky auras

— Trevor Kelly

Rachel Taylor and Trevor Kelly met while working at Ted Brown Music Company, a music store in their hometown of Tacoma, Washington. Rachel and Trevor were the founding duo that comprised He Is We. The touring members initially included Harrison Allen (drums), Carman Kubanda (guitar), and Aaron Campbell (keyboard/guitar). Later, Jake Randle (bass guitar) replaced Aaron Campbell. He Is We initially relied on social networking, using websites such as Myspace and Facebook. This online presence and the release of an album of old demos in February 2010 led to their signing with Universal Motown Records. Prior to the release of My Forever, He Is We toured with The Rocket Summer. Their debut album My Forever hit number 6 on Billboard's Heatseekers Album Charts. A second version of their song All About Us, this time featuring Owl City, was released on August 30, 2011. On December 20, 2011, the duo released a 6-track EP entitled Skip To The Good Part.

=== 2012–2017: Lineup changes, She Is We, and other releases ===
In early 2012, Rachel Taylor was diagnosed with ankylosing spondylitis, and Stevie Scott filled in for the remainder of the tour. Despite being officially replaced by Scott in August, and having stated "Walking away from the label would mean that I would be walking away from the He Is We name but I would regain my freedom to be me. I would regain my ability to connect with you fans 100% with my words. I wouldn't feel like I can only release what THEY want me to. I could be the soul that longs to escape this dreary vessel.", she returned to the band at the end of October 2012, while Trevor Kelly departed to form his own band.

After Kelly left with Stevie Scott in 2012, Rachel continued to pursue the project herself. She said that she planned to release new music and tour in 2013. In 2013, their song "All About Us", with Owl City, was included on The Mortal Instruments: City of Bones soundtrack. Despite rumors surfacing of her changing the name of He Is We and moving in a new direction, she insisted that they were completely untrue and that she would do no such thing. However, on June 23, 2014, Rachel Taylor broke away as a solo artist with her debut EP, Come Alive.

In August 2015, Taylor announced she was launching "a He Is We 2.0" with Adam Mitchell entitled She Is We. On October 22, 2015, She Is We released their first single "Boomerang" and announced that their debut album War would be available for pre-order on October 23, 2015. It was released by Vanguard Records on March 18, 2016. War was made available to stream prior to release on Billboard's website on March 11, 2016.

In August 2016, Taylor announced that she had reunited with bandmate Trevor Kelly and that they were writing new songs. In September 2016, Taylor and Kelly announced that they would be touring together.

In August 2017, touring members McBride, Mitchell, and Chamberlain left the band and in September 2017, touring guitarist Macy Santa Maria accused Taylor of sexually assaulting her. Taylor responded with her own statement, denying that a sexual assault had occurred and alleging that Santa Maria's statement mischaracterized her actions and the nature of sexual assault. Following Santa Maria's allegations, He Is We were removed as support for Secondhand Serenade's fall 2017 tour. On June 4, 2019, Rachel Taylor was found not guilty of sexual assault following a one-day trial in Jamestown, North Dakota.

In March 2017, He is We released Fall out of Line to iTunes, which contains old demos and re-released songs. The band's "For the Runaways" tour (March and April 2017) promoted the album by focusing on older He Is We songs. Trevor Kelly did not tour with the band during the "For the Runaways" tour, with Hans Hessburg filling in on acoustic guitar.

=== 2018–2021: He Is We Chapter One and Hold My Heart ===
In March 2018, He is We released He Is We Chapter One digitally, which contains re-released songs. Rachel Taylor announced in February 2018 that she was back in the studio and that she would release a new He Is We EP in March or April 2018.

He Is We announced they would be touring with Vendetta Red in March 2018.

He Is We's new EP, Hold My Heart, was released on April 10, 2018.

=== 2022–present: Treehouse ===
He Is We's second studio album entitled Treehouse was released on February 11, 2022.

In December 2023, "I Wouldn't Mind" became the subject of a TikTok trend, causing the song's streams to increase by 294%. On January 11, 2024, a sped-up version of "I Wouldn't Mind" was released. A week later, the song debuted on the TikTok Billboard Top 50 chart and remained there for around a month.

== Discography ==
- A Mess it Grows (2009)
- Old Demos (2009)
- My Forever (2010)
- Acoustic/Live EP (2010)
- Skip To the Good Part - EP (2011)
- Fall Out Of Line - EP (2017)
- He Is We Chapter One - EP (2017)
- Hold My Heart - EP (2018)
- Treehouse (2022)

=== Singles ===
Title	Year	Certifications	Album
"A Mess It Grows"	2009		A Mess it Grows
Happily Ever After	2011		My Forever
"All About Us" (He Is We featuring Owl City)	2011	RIAA: Gold	My Forever
"I Wouldn't Mind"	2018		Fall Out Of Line - EP
"All I Need"	2018		Hold My Heart - EP
"Every Other Man"	2018		Hold My Heart - EP
"Amazing Grace"	2020		non-album singles
"Hear You Me"	2024		non-album singles
"Numb" (Linkin Park cover)	2024		non-album singles

=== Guest appearances ===
- Rockin' Romance 2 – "Replay" (Iyaz cover)
