= Oh, What a Life (album) =

Studio album by American Authors
- Released: March 3, 2014
- Recorded: 2011–13
- Genres: Indie rock; heartland rock; folk rock; rock; alternative rock
- Length: 37:03
- Labels: Mercury; Island
- Producers: Shep Goodman; Aaron Accetta

American Authors chronology
American Authors (2013)	Oh, What a Life (2014)	What We Live For (2016)

Singles from Oh, What a Life
- 1. "Believer" Released: March 19, 2013; 2. "Best Day of My Life" Released: March 19, 2013; 3. "Luck" Released: March 3, 2014

Oh, What a Life is the debut studio album by American indie rock band American Authors. The album was released by Island Def Jam label Mercury Records on March 3, 2014. The album serves as a replacement to the band's eponymous 2013 extended play, American Authors.

== Background ==
American Authors first formed in 2006 in Boston, Massachusetts as The Blue Pages. The members of the band first met at the Berklee College of Music. The Blue Pages, after relocating to New York City, New York, recorded and independently released two extended plays, Anthropology in February 2011, and Rich With Love in January 2012, as name-your-price albums on online music store Bandcamp.

In 2012, The Blue Pages changed their name to American Authors. Their debut single, "Believer," garnered attention through alternative rock radio. In January 2013, the band were signed to Mercury Records.

== Reception ==
=== Critical ===
Professional ratings
Review scores
Source	Rating
AllMusic	3/5 stars

Oh, What A Life received mixed to positive reviews from critics. James Christopher Monger writing for AllMusic said of the album: “Whether they're mining the handclap-happy "Hey Ho" antics of the aforementioned Lumineers ("Luck"), rounding off the already polished edges of pop-punk with a little banjo ("Heart of Stone"), or simply repurposing big-moment group vocal-led Arcade Fire-isms (everywhere), they're doing it on their own, very shrewd terms, and without the cruel restrictions of subtlety.”

Mark Grondin from Spectrum Pulse gave the album 7/10, singling out the tracks “Luck”, “Trouble”, “Love”, and “Heart Of Stone” for praise.

== Soundtrack appearances ==
- "Best Day of My Life" was featured in a Lowe's television advertisement in the United States, a Hyundai television advertisement in the United Kingdom, a Telecom New Zealand advertisement, a trailer for the film Delivery Man, an MLB Fan Cave commercial and is the title music of Sky Sports News' My Special Day feature. It is also featured in the movie The Secret Life of Walter Mitty, Konami video game Pro Evolution Soccer 2015 and the opening sequence for ESPN's 2013 World Series of Poker coverage.
- "Hit It" is featured on EA Sports game, FIFA 14.
- "Home" was featured in a movie trailer for the movie This Is Where I Leave You and in a video honoring troops and their families.
- "Oh, What a Life" was featured in the opening montage of the 2014 ESPY Awards.

== Track listing ==
All songs written by Zac Barnett, James Shelley, Dave Rublin, Matthew Sanchez, Shep Goodman, and Aaron Accetta, except where noted. All tracks produced by Goodman and Accetta.

Standard edition
No.	Title	Writer(s)	Length
1.	"Believer"		3:03
2.	"Think About It"		3:04
3.	"Best Day of My Life"		3:14
4.	"Luck"		3:40
5.	"Trouble"		3:15
6.	"Hit It"		3:27
7.	"Home"		4:09
8.	"Love"		3:18
9.	"Heart of Stone"		3:07
10.	"Ghost"		2:55
11.	"Oh, What a Life"	Barnett; Shelley; Rublin; Sanchez	3:41
Total length:			37:03

iTunes Store deluxe edition
No.	Title	Length
12.	"Best Day of My Life" (acoustic)	3:15
Total length:		40:18

== Personnel ==
American Authors

- Zac Barnett – lead and background vocals, guitar, additional production
- James Adam Shelley – guitar, banjo, mandolin, background vocals, additional production
- Dave Rublin – bass guitar, background vocals, additional production
- Matt Sanchez – drums, percussion, background vocals, additional production

Additional personnel

- Aaron Accetta – production, background vocals (all tracks); mixing (1, 3), engineering (1–7, 11)
- Shep Goodman – production, background vocals (all tracks); mixing (1, 3), engineering (1–7, 11)
- Mark Needham – mixing (2, 4–11)
- Chris Gehringer – mastering
- Joe Costable – engineering (8–10), engineering assistance (2, 4–7, 11)
- JC Santalis – engineering assistance (2, 5, 8–11)
- Jay Fallon – engineering assistance (2, 5, 8–11)
- Will Brierre – mixing assistance (2, 4–11)
- Steven Defino – art direction, design, cover photo
- Meredith Truax – cover photo, photography
- Sharon Lamb – photography, art coordination
- Andrew Zaeh – photography
- Andy Proctor – package production
- Peter Blume – horn arrangement (11)
- Erica Swindell – string arrangement (11)

== Charts ==
=== Weekly charts ===
Chart (2014)	Peak position
Australian Albums (ARIA)	35
Austrian Albums (Ö3 Austria)	58
Canadian Albums (Billboard)	12
German Albums (Offizielle Top 100)	68
Scottish Albums (Official Charts)	22
UK Albums (Official Charts)	26
US Billboard 200	15
US Top Rock Albums (Billboard)	3
US Top Alternative Albums (Billboard)	3

=== Year-end charts ===
Chart (2014)	Position
US Alternative Albums (Billboard)	49
US Top Rock Albums	63

== Certifications ==
Region	Certification	Certified units/sales
Canada (Music Canada)	Gold	40,000^{‡}
Norway (IFPI Norway)	Gold	10,000^{‡}
United States (RIAA)	Gold	500,000^{‡}
^{‡} Sales+streaming figures based on certification alone.
