= MLB Fan Cave =

Coordinates: 40.728249°N 73.994338°W

The MLB Fan Cave was a building on Fourth Street and Broadway in NoHo, Manhattan, New York City, designed by Paul DiMeo, where baseball fans, selected by Major League Baseball as part of its Dreamjob program, were tasked with watching every baseball game in the entire year. According to Major League Baseball,

The what makes it good Fan Cave grew out of our desire to address three specific areas in which we saw opportunity for growth: engaging with fans via social media, both at the league level and through players; reaching younger fans and converting casual baseball fans into more avid followers; and raising the profile of our players by showcasing their off-field personalities

— Tim Brosnan, MLB Executive Vice President of Business, Lost Remote

The "cave dwellers" (fans selected to live in the Fan Cave) were responsible for recording their experiences through social media, blogs, and videos (all online), as well as hosting concerts, fan events, and celebrity guests. It was located in the space formerly occupied by Tower Records’ famed Greenwich Village location.

== 2011 Season ==
The MLB Fan Cave first opened at the beginning of the 2011 season with two cave dwellers, Mike O'Hara, a 37-year-old Yankee fan and Ryan Wagner, a 25-year-old Orioles fan, selected to live in the Fan Cave from a pool of 10,000 applicants. The application process included a video submission, writing samples, and interviews with MLB Network and MLB executives.

== 2013 Season ==
In 2013, nine more cave dwellers joined the MLB Fan Cave. Also joining them in the Cave was a nine-armed octopus nicknamed, Nonopus. Throughout the season, a number of MLB All-Stars visited, including Josh Donaldson, José Bautista, David Ortiz, Andrew McCutchen and Cliff Lee. The season ended with three finalists watching the Boston Red Sox win the World Series with Los Angeles Angels fan Danny Farris being named the winner of the season.

== Closing ==
On February 9, 2015, it was reported that the Fan Cave would cease existence, and the building would be used for other promotional events.
