= American Authors =

American rock band

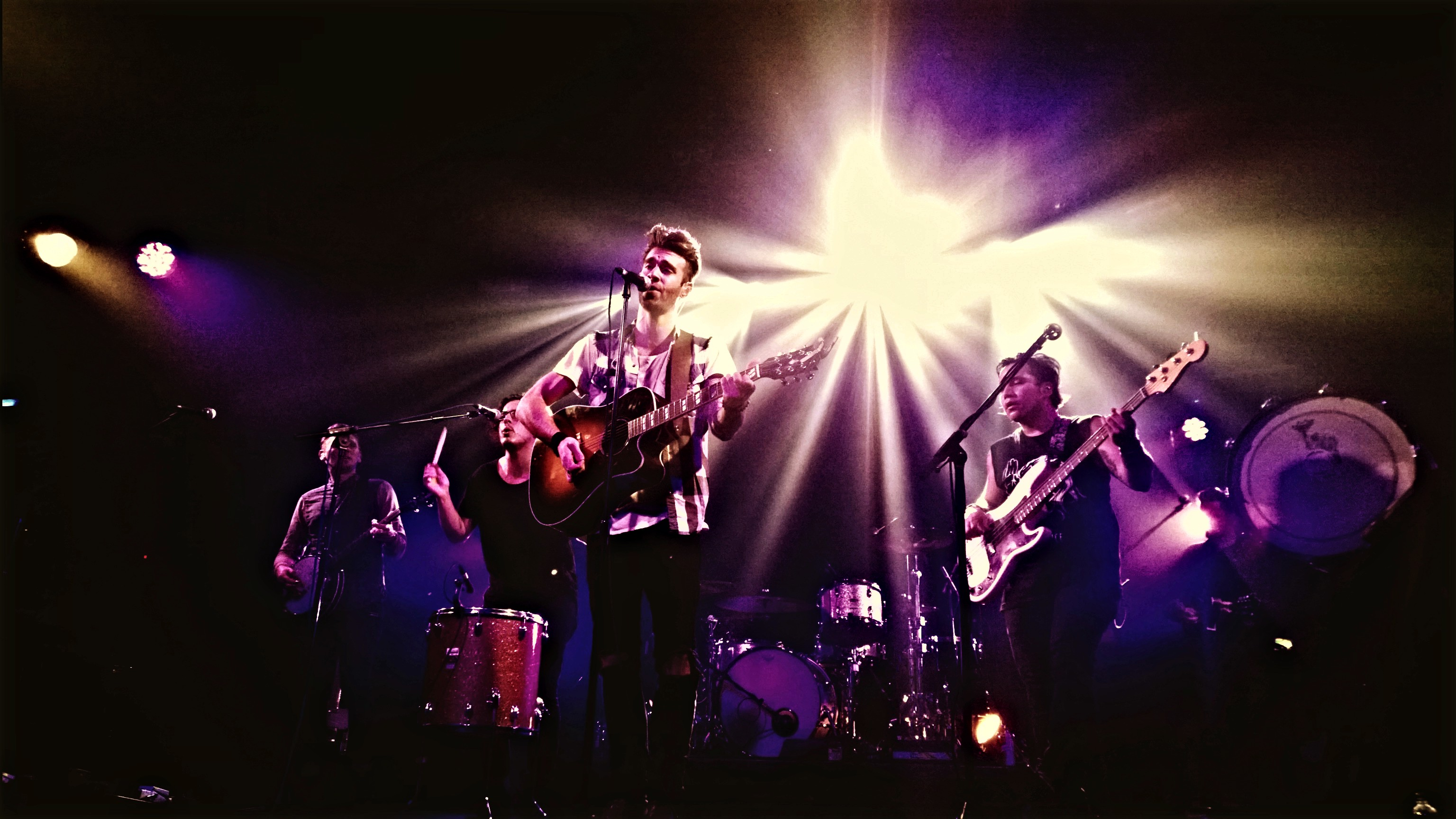
- American Authors performing in 2014

Background information
- Also known as: The Blue Pages (2006–2012)
- Origin: Boston, Massachusetts, US
- Genres: Pop rock; alternative rock; folk rock; indie rock
- Years active: 2006–present
- Labels: French Poet Society; Mercury; Island
- Members: Zac Barnett; Dave Rublin; Matt Sanchez
- Past members: James Adam Shelley
- Website: weareamericanauthors.com

American Authors, formerly known as the Blue Pages, are an American rock band originally from Boston, based in New York City, that consists of lead vocalist and guitarist Zac Barnett, bassist Dave Rublin, and drummer Matt Sanchez. Guitarist and banjoist James Adam Shelley is a former member. They are best known for their hit singles "Believer" and "Best Day of My Life", from their debut album, Oh, What a Life, as well as their top 20 hit "Go Big or Go Home", from their second album, What We Live For. The band, previously signed to Island Records, now releases music independently.

== History ==
=== 2006–2011: Early years ===
The members of American Authors met while attending Berklee College of Music in 2006. The quartet spent their first years in Boston recording and performing music under the name The Blue Pages. In May 2010, the band opened for Cash Cash on the Robots in High-Tops tour. In 2010, they relocated to Brooklyn. On December 1, 2010, the Blue Pages independently released their single "Run Back Home" on iTunes.

=== 2012–2015: Name change, debut album ===
In 2012, the group changed their name to American Authors. In January 2013, the band was signed to Mercury Records. Their debut single, "Believer", garnered attention through alternative rock radio. On March 19, 2013, they released their most successful single to date, "Best Day of My Life".

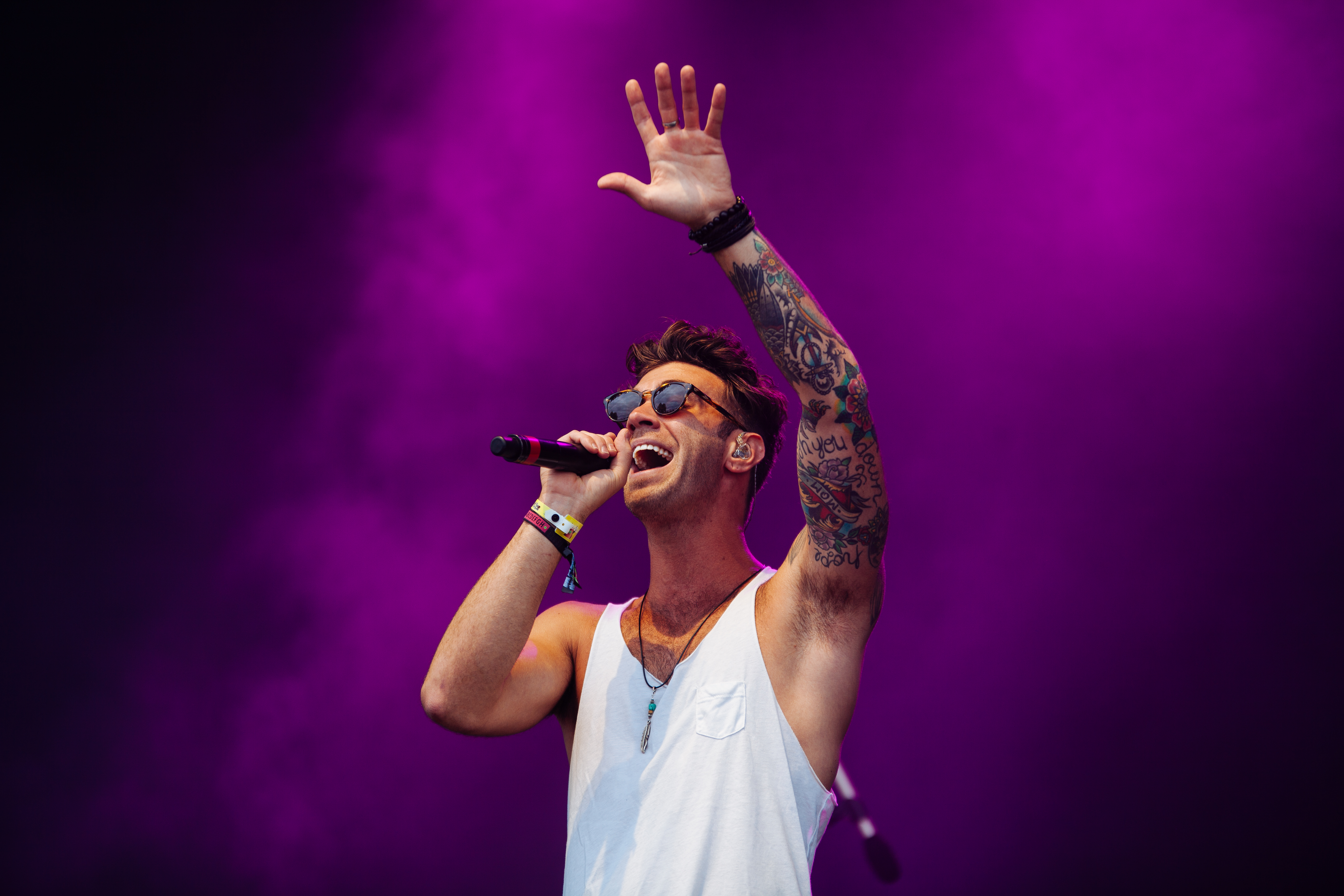
Vocalist Barnett at Highfield Festival 2014

American Authors released their self-titled debut EP on August 27, 2013. In 2013, the group won Overall Grand Prize in the 18th Annual USA Songwriting Competition with their song "Believer".

They released their debut studio album, Oh, What a Life, on March 3, 2014, and subsequently ranked at number nine on Billboard's chart of Top New Artists for that year. In July 2015, the band was picked as Elvis Duran's Artist of the Month and featured on NBC's Today show, performing the song "Best Day of My Life".

=== 2015–2019: What We Live For, Seasons ===
From 2015 to 2016, American Authors worked on their second album, What We Live For. The lead single, "Go Big or Go Home", was released on May 18, 2015, a year before the album's publication. On December 11, 2015, the band issued the single "Pride", and "What We Live For" followed on April 1, 2016. The album was released on July 1, 2016. "I'm Born to Run" was issued as the record's fourth and final single in 2017.

American Authors released the single "Deep Water" on May 17, 2018, preceding their third studio album. In December, they announced the record's title, Seasons. Its third single, "Say Amen", came out on November 16, 2018, followed by "Neighborhood" on December 7 and "Stay Around" on January 11, 2019. The song "Bring It on Home" was featured in an official trailer for the documentary film The Biggest Little Farm on January 29, 2019. Seasons was released on February 1, 2019.

=== 2020–2022: Counting Down, covers, and collaborations ===
On January 17, 2020, American Authors released a new single titled "Microphone". On February 28, they published a song with Seeb, titled "Best I Can". On September 18, 2020, they released the EP Counting Down.

On April 23, 2021, the band announced on Twitter that James Adam Shelley would no longer be part of the band and that American Authors would continue without him.

On June 25, 2021, American Authors released their first song as a trio, "Nice and Easy", which features Mark McGrath of Sugar Ray. They also announced that they would be moving forward with their own independent label. The band later teamed up with Rob Thomas and Santana for the song "Move", from the latter's most recent album, Blessings and Miracles. On October 29, 2021, they released an original Christmas song called 'Favorite Time of the Year".

In 2022, the band issued a cover of "Good 4 U" by Olivia Rodrigo and "Circles" by Post Malone, as well as two Christmas songs, "Christmas Karaoke" and "Sleigh Ride".

=== 2022–present: Best Night of My Life, Call Your Mother ===
On September 9, 2022, American Authors released "Blind for Love", the first single from their fourth studio album, Best Night of My Life, which came out on February 10, 2023. They followed it on January 13, 2023, with the single "Best Night of My Life". On February 3, 2023, the third and final single, "We Happy Don't Worry", was released.

After the release of Best Night of My Life, American Authors issued a few standalone songs online, beginning with a collaboration with Billy Raffoul, "Perfectly Imperfect", on August 18, 2023. On November 1, they published a cover of "Sweet Caroline" by Neil Diamond. They ended the year by releasing two holiday singles, including the original song "Come Home to Me" and a cover of "Christmas in Hollis" by Run-DMC.

On March 11, 2024, the band announced their fifth studio album, Call Your Mother. The lead single, "My Last Dime", came out on March 29 and was followed by "Daises" on April 19. The third single, issued on May 17, was a cover of "Save Tonight" by Eagle-Eye Cherry. The fourth single, "Can't Stand the Mourning", was released on June 21, 2024. The fifth single, "Something Amazing", which features Rozes, was issued on July 26, 2024, and was followed by the sixth single, "Come Too Far", on August 22, 2024. The seventh single, "Bon Voyage", came out on September 20, 2024. Call Your Mother came out on October 18, 2024.

== In other media ==
The American Authors song "Hit It" is featured in the EA Sports game FIFA 14. Their song "Best Day of My Life" was used in an MLB Fan Cave commercial and is the title music of Sky Sports News' My Special Day feature. It has also appeared in a television spot for the movie The Secret Life of Walter Mitty, in an episode of the television show The Vampire Diaries, and in the 2013 Boston Red Sox World Series championships. The song was ranked number one on Billboard's 2014 Adult Pop Songs chart. The song "Home" was featured in a trailer for the movie This Is Where I Leave You and in a video honoring troops and their families.

American Authors' second single, "Best Day of My Life", was featured in, among other things, a Lowe's television advertisement in the United States, a Hyundai television advertisement in the United Kingdom, an advertisement in South Africa for Castle Lager, and a Telecom New Zealand advertisement. It appears in a trailer for the film Delivery Man, in the Konami video game Pro Evolution Soccer 2015, in the opening sequence for ESPN's 2013 World Series of Poker coverage, in a trailer for Earth to Echo as well as How to Train Your Dragon 2, in the film Humpback Whales, and a trailer for St. Vincent. The track is also featured in the video game Guitar Hero Live. The song won the newly established Sync Music Award at the SESAC Pop Awards 2015. American Authors band members also had cameos in the TV show Bar Rescue.

== Festivals and events ==
The group has appeared at various music festivals and events, including Lollapalooza, SXSW Music Festival, Firefly Music Festival, Reading Festival, Leeds Festival, Bunbury Music Festival, Freakfest, Grammys on the Hill (an awards ceremony honoring artists and legislators who have improved the environment for music creators), BottleRock Napa Valley, Keloorah, Pukkelpop, and Polartec Big Air at Fenway.

== Band members ==
Current

- Zac Barnett – lead vocals, rhythm guitar (2006–present), lead guitar (2021–present)
- Dave Rublin – bass, backing vocals, keyboards (2006–present)
- Matt Sanchez – drums, percussion, backing vocals (2006–present)

Past

- James Adam Shelley – lead guitar, backing vocals, keyboards, banjo, mandolin (2006–2021)

== Discography ==
Studio albums

- Oh, What a Life (2014)
- What We Live For (2016)
- Seasons (2019)
- Best Night of My Life (2023)
- Call Your Mother (2024)

== See also ==
- List of alternative rock artists
- List of Berklee College of Music alumni
- List of Mercury Records artists
