= Attaloss =

American rock band

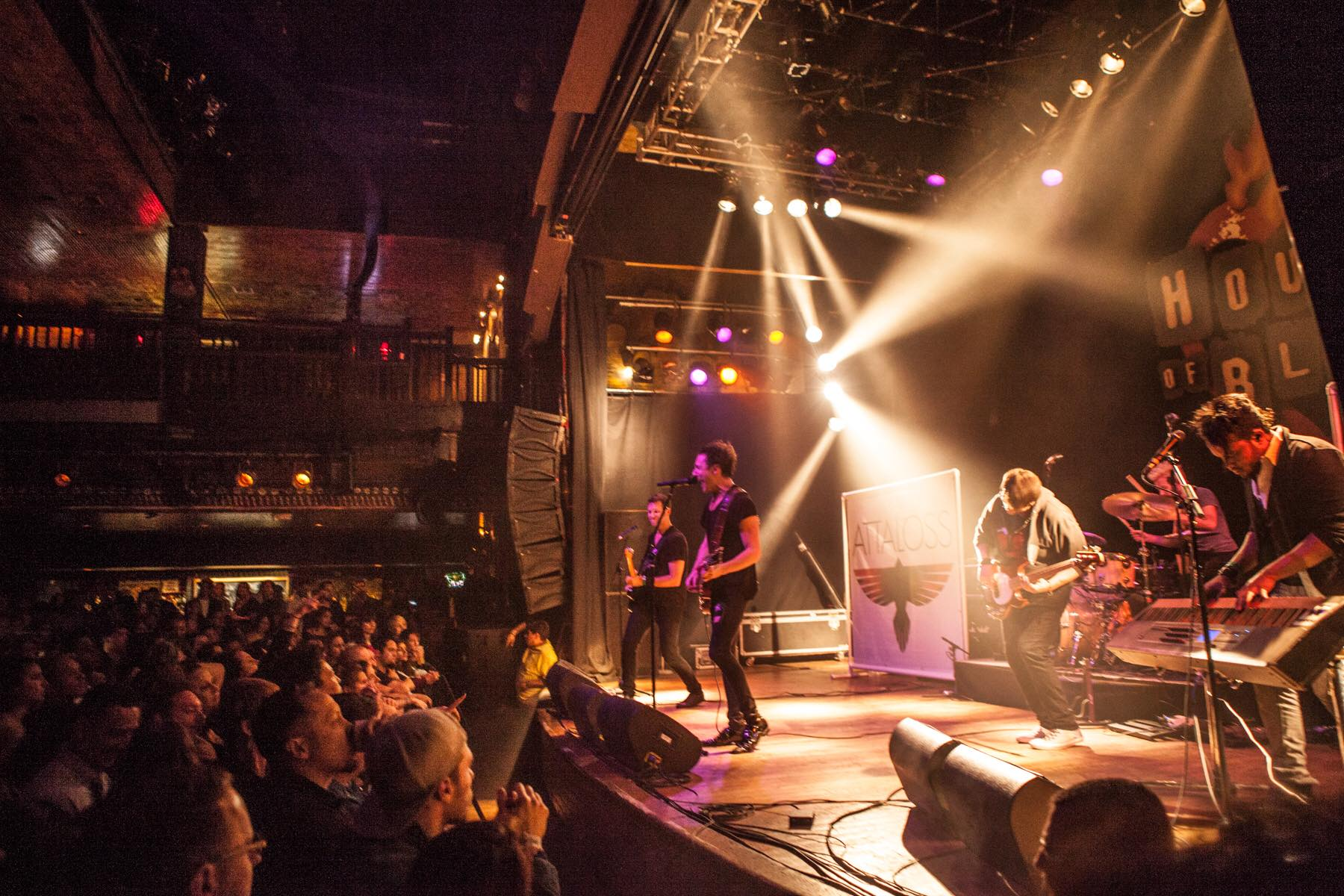
- Attaloss at House Of Blues

Background information
- Origin: Los Angeles, California, U.S.
- Genres: Alternative rock
- Years active: 2010–present
- Labels: Rock Ridge Music
- Members: Danny Aguiluz; Andre Ribeiro; Chris Johansen; Dakota Clark
- Past members: Matt Geronimo
- Website: www.attaloss.com

Attaloss is an American rock band from Los Angeles, California, United States, currently signed to Rock Ridge Music.

The band released their self-titled album on April 10, 2012, and first week sales have pushed the release onto four Billboard charts. The album, which was released by Rock Ridge Music/Warner Music Group/ADA, hit #1 on Billboard Alternative New Artists, #5 on Billboard Heatseekers, #25 on Billboard Hard Rock Albums, and #42 on Billboard Indie chart. The album also cracked the Billboard Top 200 sales chart.

== Discography ==
=== Studio albums ===
Year	Album details	Peak chart positions		
Year	Album details	Hard Rock	Top Heatseekers	Alt. New Artists
2012	ATTALOSS: Released: April 10, 2012; Label: Rock Ridge Music	25	5	1
