= Best Day of My Life =

2013 single by American Authors

Single by American Authors

from the album Oh, What a Life
- Released: March 19, 2013
- Recorded: 2012
- Studio: Dirty Canvas Studios (Mt. Kisco, New York); Raw Recording (Brewster, New York)
- Genre: Pop rock; indie folk; alternative rock
- Length: 3:14
- Label: Mercury; Island
- Songwriters: Aaron Accetta; Zachary Barnett; Shep Goodman; David Rublin; Matthew Sanchez; James Shelley
- Producers: Aaron Accetta; Shep Goodman

American Authors singles chronology
"Believer" (2013)	"Best Day of My Life" (2013)	"Luck" (2014)

Music video
- "Best Day of My Life" on YouTube

"Best Day of My Life" is a song by American pop rock band American Authors, released on March 19, 2013, by Mercury Records and Island Records as the lead single from their third extended play, American Authors (2013), and the second single from their debut studio album, Oh, What a Life (2014). The song was written by band members Zac Barnett, Dave Rublin, Matt Sanchez, and James Adam Shelley, along with producers Aaron Accetta and Shep Goodman.

== Composition ==
The song is written in D major with a tempo of 96 beats per minute.

== Music and lyrics ==
Dave Rublin spoke in a podcast of Songfacts where he disclosed that the song was being written when the Sandy Hook Elementary School shooting happened in 2012. They were inspired to write the song to "make people happy and make people feel positive because that was missing from rock and songwriting, just something so simplistic that can be an earworm, that can carry people."

Zac Barnett told an interviewer for Blueprint Magazine, "Recently we have been experimenting with a lot of different instruments including banjo, mandolin, and various percussion toys. Africa-influenced rhythms have been taking more of a prominent role in our songs which has then opened up our ideas on melodies. We're always open to trying new things and we get very excited to learn new instruments and experiment with new sounds. ... "Best Day of My Life" was an idea that James and I had been messing around with. We had the pre-chorus and chorus but once we showed the idea to the rest of the guys they came in and restructured the verses and added the stuttered "life" chorus. Looking back on it, the song changed a lot from the initial idea but that's what I love so much about it. I'll always remember that song being started on acoustic guitars in my tiny Bushwick bedroom, but all of us together as a band really took the song to a completely different place."

Barnett mentions "the stuttered 'life' chorus"—as in "the best day of my li-i-i-i-ife"; the "stuttering" also occurs in a recurrent "whoa-oh-oh-oh-oh-oh-oh"—by which he refers to a lyrical tradition of stuttering in rock music, popularized by Buddy Holly, David Bowie ("Changes"), Elton John ("Bennie and the Jets"), and others.

Bill Lamb, writing for About.com, praised the song's "opening banjo lick" as "a perfect first hook," its "irrepressibly upbeat lyrics," and "a blend of key elements from across a wide range of current successful pop music." He added, "The bass drum heavy backing percussion sounds a little like Imagine Dragons, and backed by a pop-punk style "Whoa Oh" chorus, "Best Day of My Life" takes some of the most distinctive elements of a variety of current pop hit genres and blends them into something new."

The song also uses the millennial whoop.

== Packaging ==
The single art for the "Best Day of My Life" single features a photograph of the skyline of Midtown Manhattan, with the Empire State Building in the center of the shot, from Brooklyn looking north. The photograph is overwritten by the American Authors logo on the majority of the photograph and the words "American Authors", with "Best Day of My Life" written underneath it.

== Commercial performance ==
The song received significant airplay on the radio for it to debut at No. 49 in the Hot Rock Songs and No. 40 in the Adult Top 40 for charts dated October 5, 2013. It began climbing the various rock charts and became a crossover hit on both alternative rock and top 40 stations, becoming big hits on those formats and peaking at No. 2, No. 18 and No. 4 on the Hot Rock Songs, Alternative Songs, and Mainstream Top 40 charts, and was a sleeper hit.

It debuted on the Billboard Hot 100 at No. 93 for the chart dated November 30, 2013, and eventually peaked at No. 11 on the charts dated April 19 and May 10, 2014. By March, 2014, it had reached No. 1 on the Adult Top 40. The song reached its first million sales mark in the United States in March 2014, and its second million in August 2014. The song was certified 2× Platinum on July 16, 2014, by the Recording Industry Association of America (RIAA). The song was ranked number one on Billboard's chart of Adult Pop Songs for 2014. To date, it remains the only single by the band to break the top 40 in the United States.

== Usage in media ==
=== Commercials ===
In media, the song has been featured in television advertisements for: retail home improvement store Lowe's in the United States, which were aired during the Super Bowl, automotive manufacturer Hyundai in the United Kingdom and France, an alcohol retailer in Australia and communications service provider Telecom New Zealand in New Zealand. The song is used in advertisements for Petron, Datsun Go, Lay's, Center Parcs and Graton Casinos. The song was used in commercials for Best Western hotels. The song was used in a Ford sales event commercial and is used by Alaska Communications in adverts. In the Philippines, back in 2017, this song is featured in the Petron commercial as their new jingle.

=== Film ===
It appears in the movie trailer for the films Delivery Man, Yes Day, The Secret Life of Walter Mitty in addition to the TV spots for St. Vincent. Portions of the song are played throughout the 2014 film "Moms Night Out" and in the 2015 film, Paul Blart: Mall Cop 2. The song was used in the 2015 film Top Cat Begins, and also plays during the credits. A 2024 cover of the song, a poppunk version by Ivyvox, has been used in the Dutch film Loving Bali made by movie director Johan Nijenhuis.

=== Television ===
The song has also been used in the Vampire Diaries episode "Total Eclipse of the Heart". The song was covered by Blaine Anderson (Darren Criss) and Sam Evans (Chord Overstreet) in the 2014 Glee episode "New New York". American Authors performed the song while in Human Centipede position on season four premiere of The Eric Andre Show. The BBC used the track during their closing montage for their 2016 United States presidential election coverage. An instrumental version of the song is used as the news theme for Tegna-owned stations.

=== Sports ===
The song was heard in the opening sequence for ESPN's coverage of the 2013 and 2014 World Series of Poker as well as during their coverage of the 2013 Little League World Series. NHL on NBC used this song as a theme song for the 2014 Stanley Cup Playoffs. The Oklahoma City Thunder (NBA) used the song in the 2014–15 pregame activities.

=== Video games ===
"Best Day of My Life" was part of the FIFA 14 soundtrack before being removed shortly after the game's release. "Best Day of My Life" also appeared as a playable track for the video game Guitar Hero Live. "Best Day of My Life" also appeared as a soundtrack in Konami video game Pro Evolution Soccer 2015 as the opening track.

=== Live ===
"Best Day of My Life", was the official song of the 2017 Maltese Labour Party's General Election Campaign, entitled "L-aqwa żmien ta' pajjiżna." (The Best time for our country). "Best Day of My Life" was played at the conclusion of the 2015 Miss America pageant, during Kira Kazantsev's crowning moment. The song was used as a fanfare to welcome the Singapore Armed Forces Parachute Team (better known as the Red Lions) during the National Day Celebrations of 2014 in Singapore.

== Music video ==
The music video was released on October 18, 2013, via YouTube. The video was filmed in Brooklyn, New York. It depicts a man engaging in various activities with a large furry monster, such as drinking in a bar called Sweet & Vicious in Nolita, playing basketball, looking at the Brooklyn Bridge, getting matching tattoos, visiting a strip club, and going to a playground. At the end of the video, it is implied that the monster is his imaginary friend, but then the puzzled bartender finds a photo of the two.

Zac Barnett, in an interview with the Jim & Kim Morning Show (Fresh 102.7 FM, New York City), explained that the video starts in Nolita and ends up in Brooklyn, and the journey of the man and his monster pal is the focus of the video. That journey is interweaved with shots of the band playing and singing as they also stroll through New York. "We started in Manhattan and walked across the bridge to the party which was down in Dumbo. What it was, we were kind of trying to do a reverse Where the Wild Things Are type thing. You know, instead of a human going into a monster dream world, what would it be like if a monster came into our world and experienced New York City and Brooklyn and all of these things. And playing off of that, it was kind of like an alter ego of a dude and these two, together, just showing each other the best days of their lives."

Common Sense Media reviewed the video for parents: "There's nothing iffy to worry about in the song's upbeat, clean lyrics about having a positive outlook on life and never giving up, but the official music video shows a man and his furry monster friend drinking in a bar, going to a strip club, and getting tattoos. Kids will be more entertained by the adorable dog-version music video for "Best Day of My Life", which shows one lucky bulldog's adoption day in an effort to promote pet adoption."

== Track listing ==
Digital download
No.	Title	Writer(s)	Producer(s)	Length
1.	"Best Day of My Life"	Aaron Accetta; Zachary Barnett; Shep Goodman; David Rublin; Matthew Sanchez; James Shelley	Accetta; Goodman	3:14

== Personnel ==
Adapted from Oh, What a Life liner notes.

American Authors

- Zac Barnett – lead vocals, guitar
- James Adam Shelley – banjo
- Dave Rublin – bass
- Matt Sanchez – drums

Technical personnel

- Aaron Accetta – production
- Michael Goodman – production

== Charts ==
=== Weekly charts ===
Weekly chart performance for "Best Day of My Life"
Chart (2013–2014)	Peak position
Australia (ARIA)	10
Austria (Ö3 Austria Top 40)	20
Belgium (Ultratop 50 Flanders)	36
Belgium (Ultratip Bubbling Under Wallonia)	15
Canada Hot 100 (Billboard)	5
Canada AC (Billboard)	3
Canada CHR/Top 40 (Billboard)	7
Canada Hot AC (Billboard)	3
Czech Republic Airplay (ČNS IFPI)	21
Czech Republic Singles Digital (ČNS IFPI)	13
Germany (GfK)	34
Ireland (IRMA)	28
Japan Hot 100 (Billboard)	95
Mexico (Billboard Ingles Airplay)	1
Mexico Anglo (Monitor Latino)	1
Netherlands (Dutch Top 40)	34
Netherlands (Single Top 100)	44
New Zealand (Recorded Music NZ)	13
Poland Airplay (ZPAV)	8
Scottish Singles Sales (Official Charts)	15
Slovakia Airplay (ČNS IFPI)	17
Slovakia Singles Digital (ČNS IFPI)	13
Slovenia (SloTop50)	6
Sweden (Sverigetopplistan)	10
Switzerland (Schweizer Hitparade)	65
UK Singles (Official Charts)	17
US Billboard Hot 100	11
US Hot Rock & Alternative Songs (Billboard)	2
US Rock & Alternative Airplay (Billboard)	15
US Adult Contemporary (Billboard)	2
US Adult Pop Airplay (Billboard)	1
US Dance Airplay (Billboard)	25
US Pop Airplay (Billboard)	4

=== Year-end charts ===
2013 year-end chart performance for "Best Day of My Life"
Chart (2013)	Position
US Hot Rock Songs (Billboard)	77

2014 year-end chart performance for "Best Day of My Life"
Chart (2014)	Position
Australia (ARIA)	58
Canada (Canadian Hot 100)	24
Italy (FIMI)	65
Netherlands (Single Top 100)	89
Slovenia (SloTop50)	24
Sweden (Sverigetopplistan)	24
US Billboard Hot 100	31
US Hot Rock Songs (Billboard)	5
US Adult Alternative Songs (Billboard)	22
US Adult Contemporary (Billboard)	4
US Adult Top 40 (Billboard)	1
US Mainstream Top 40 (Billboard)	28

2015 year-end chart performance for "Best Day of My Life"
Chart (2015)	Position
US Adult Contemporary (Billboard)	50

=== Decade-end charts ===
2010s-end chart performance for "Best Day of My Life"
Chart (2010–2019)	Position
US Hot Rock Songs (Billboard)	39

=== All-time charts ===
All-time chart performance for "Best Day of My Life"
Chart	Position
US Adult Top 40 (Billboard)	18

== Certifications ==
Certifications and sales for "Best Day of My Life"
Region	Certification	Certified units/sales
Australia (ARIA)	4× Platinum	280,000^{‡}
Brazil (Pro-Música Brasil)	3× Platinum	180,000^{‡}
Canada (Music Canada)	7× Platinum	560,000^{‡}
Germany (BVMI)	Platinum	300,000^{‡}
Italy (FIMI)	Platinum	30,000^{‡}
Mexico (AMPROFON)	Platinum	60,000^{*}
New Zealand (RMNZ)	3× Platinum	90,000^{‡}
Spain (Promusicae)	Platinum	60,000^{‡}
Sweden (GLF)	3× Platinum	120,000^{‡}
United Kingdom (BPI)	2× Platinum	1,200,000^{‡}
United States (RIAA)	6× Platinum	6,000,000^{‡}
Streaming
Denmark (IFPI Danmark)	Platinum	2,600,000^{†}
^{*} Sales figures based on certification alone.^{‡} Sales+streaming figures based on certification alone.^{†} Streaming-only figures based on certification alone.

== Release history ==
Release dates for "Best Day of My Life"
Country	Date	Format	Label
United States	March 19, 2013	Digital download	Mercury
United States	August 20, 2013	Modern rock radio	Mercury; Island Def Jam
United States	August 26, 2013	Hot adult contemporary radio	Mercury; Island Def Jam
United States	December 3, 2013	Contemporary hit radio	Island Def Jam
United Kingdom	March 7, 2014	Digital download (Gazzo remix)	Island Def Jam
United States	March 7, 2014	Digital download (Gazzo remix)	Island Def Jam
United Kingdom	April 29, 2014	Digital download (Just a Gent remix)	Island Def Jam
United States	April 29, 2014	Digital download (Just a Gent remix)	Island Def Jam
Germany	May 9, 2014	Compact disc	Island
