= Shep Goodman =

American record producer and songwriter

- Genres: Pop, Alternative, Rock
- Instruments: Guitar, Bass, Vocals
- Years active: 2011-present

Shep Goodman is an American New York–based multi-platinum record producer, songwriter, and musician. He got his start in the music industry, by fronting the Elektra Records signed rock-act, Coward. After the disbandment of the band, he started the music production company Sheppard Music Inc with Kenny Gioia. They were known as "Shep & Kenny", and began writing and producing for various artists. One of the first break thru songs Shep and Kenny produced was the pop radio production of the Lee Ann Womack hit "I Hope You Dance". They then went on to write/produce for many pop and rock artists including Mandy Moore, Aaron Carter, LFO, Jonas Brothers, Bayside, Ingrid Michaelson, and produced the number one AC single "Do It for Love" for pop icons Daryl Hall & John Oates.

Goodman held the position of Vice President of A&R at Universal Motown Records from 2007 until 2011. He is currently co-owner of Dirty Canvas Productions, which is a full scale music production company focused on artist development. The first artist signed to Dirty Canvas was Brooklyn based alternative rock band American Authors, whose song "Best Day of My Life" (co-written and produced by Goodman) reached multi-platinum status in several countries.

== Artists Goodman has worked with ==
- American Authors
- Young Rising Sons
- Rob Thomas
- Lee Ann Womack
- Ingrid Michaelson
- Hall & Oates
- Bayside
- 888 - Mngt
- Jonas Brothers
- Mandy Moore
- Aaron Carter
- LFO
- Dreamers
- MisterWives
- Forever the Sickest Kids
- Peyton List
- Micky James
- The Orphan The Poet
- The Unlikely Candidates
- Cosmos & Creature
- Brick + Mortar
- The Karma Killers
- Livingston
- Four Year Strong
- Head Automatica
- Carter Rubin
- He Is We
- Lydia
- Cute Is What We Aim For
- Straylight Run
- Get Scared
- Tina Parol
- Blue October
- Red Car Wire
- Kim Sozzi
- Templeton Pek
- Her Bright Skies
- Lions Lions
- Vitamin C
- Her Bright Skies
- From Autumn To Ashes
- The Never Ever
- Drake Bell
- Jordan Knight
- Punchline
- Brooke Hogan
- Willa Ford
- Paulina Rubio
- The Distance
- Westland
- Echo Screen
