= Lit discography =

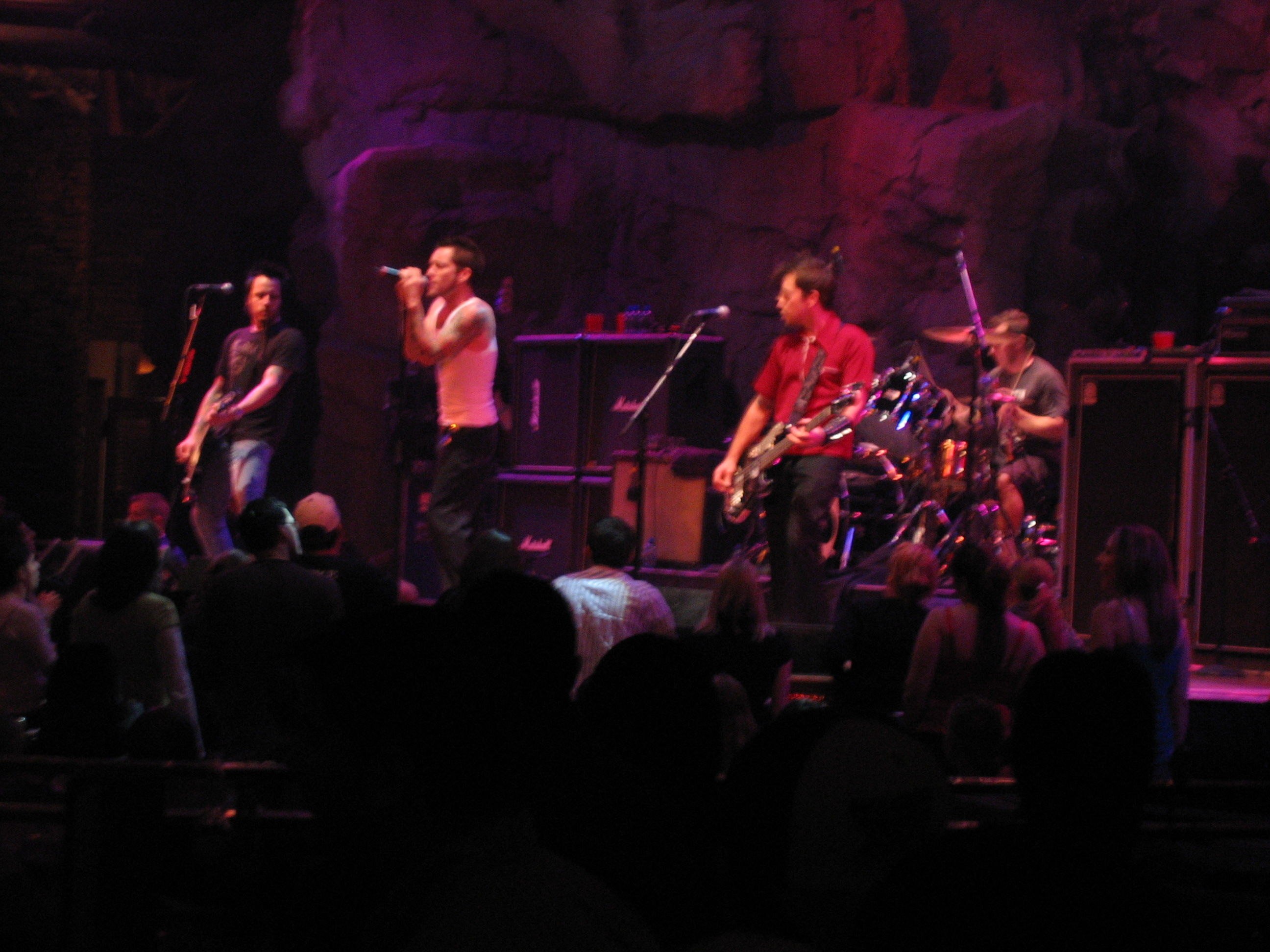
- Lit performing in 2005
- Studio albums: 6
- Extended plays: 1
- Compilation albums: 1
- Singles: 13
- Music videos: 23
- As featured artist: 2

This is the discography of the American rock band Lit. They have released six studio albums, one compilation album, one EP, one live album, thirteen singles, and twenty-three music videos.

== Albums ==
=== Studio albums ===
Title	Album details	Peak chart positions		Sales	Certifications
Title	Album details	US	UK	Sales	Certifications
Tripping the Light Fantastic	Released: April 1, 1997; Label: Malicious Vinyl; Format: CD	—	—	US: 35,000+	
A Place in the Sun	Released: February 23, 1999; Label: RCA; Format: CD, CS	31	52	US: 1,300,000+	RIAA: Platinum; BPI: Silver; MC: Gold
Atomic	Released: October 16, 2001; Label: RCA; Format: CS, CD	36	179	US: 128,000+	
Lit	Released: June 22, 2004; Label: DRT/Nitrus; Format: CD	113	—		
The View from the Bottom	Released: June 19, 2012; Label: Megaforce; Format: CD, digital download	— (Note: The View from the Bottom did not enter the US Billboard 200, but peaked at number 167 on the US Billboard Top Current Album Sales chart.)	—		
These Are the Days	Released: December 15, 2017; Label: Dirty Martini; Format: CD, digital download	—	—		
Tastes Like Gold	Released: June 17, 2022; Label: Round Hill; Format: CD, digital download, streaming	—	—		
"—" denotes a release that did not chart.

=== Compilation albums ===
Title	Album details
Platinum & Gold Collection	Released: July 9, 2004; Label: RCA; Format: CD, digital download

=== Live albums ===
Title	Album details
Live In NY, 99	Released: September 7, 1999; Label: Dirty Martini

== Extended plays ==
Title	Album details
New Vibe Revolution (as Razzle)	Released: 1993; Format: CD
Five Smokin' Tracks from Lit	Released: December 10, 1996; Label: Malicious Vinyl; Format: CD

== Singles ==
=== As lead artist ===
Year	Title	Peak chart positions								Certifications	Album
Year	Title	US	US Alt.	US Main. Rock	AUS	CAN Alt.	NL	SCO	UK	Certifications	Album
1997	"Bitter"	—	—	—	—	—	—	—	—		Tripping the Light Fantastic
1997	"Dozer"	—	—	—	—	—	—	—	—		Tripping the Light Fantastic
1999	"My Own Worst Enemy"	51	1	6	60	8	56	17	16	RIAA: 2× Platinum; BPI: Gold; RMNZ: Platinum	A Place in the Sun
1999	"Zip-Lock"	—	11	34	—	—	—	—	60		A Place in the Sun
2000	"Miserable"	— (Note: "Miserable" did not enter the Billboard Hot 100, but it peaked at number 17 on the Bubbling Under Hot 100 chart.)	3	29	—	—	—	—	—		A Place in the Sun
2001	"Over My Head"	—	22	—	—	—	—	30	37		Atomic
2001	"Lipstick and Bruises"	—	10	28	—	—	—	—	—		Atomic
2001	"Addicted"	—	23	—	—	—	—	—	—		Atomic
2004	"Looks Like They Were Right"	—	34	—	—	—	—	—	—		Lit
2004	"Times Like This"	—	—	—	—	—	—	—	—		Lit
2012	"You Tonight"	—	—	—	—	—	—	—	—		The View from the Bottom
2012	"The Broken"	—	—	—	—	—	—	—	—		The View from the Bottom
2016	"Fast"	—	—	—	—	—	—	—	—		These Are the Days
2018	"Good Problem to Have"	—	—	—	—	—	—	—	—		These Are the Days
2020	"Get Back"	—	—	—	—	—	—	—	—		Non-album single (Note: "Get Back" was a B-side recorded for their 2004 self-titled album that was later released as a standalone single in 2020.)
2021	"Yeah Yeah Yeah"	—	—	—	—	—	—	—	—		Tastes Like Gold
2023	"My Own Worst Anti-Hero" (Note: "My Own Worst Anti-Hero" is a mashup of "My Own Worst Enemy" and a cover of "Anti-Hero" by Taylor Swift.)	—	—	—	—	—	—	—	—		Non-album single
2023	"The Life That I Got"	—	—	—	—	—	—	—	—		Tastes Like Gold
2024	"Breakaway"	—	—	—	—	—	—	—	—		Non-album single
"—" denotes a release that did not chart.

=== As featured artist ===
Title	Year	Album
2022	"American Dream" (DIAMANTE featuring Lit)	Non-album singles
2022	"777" (Chad Tepper featuring Lit)	Non-album singles

== Music videos ==
Year	Title	Album
1995	"My World" (as Stain) (Note: The "My World" music video was released earlier in 1995, when the band was still named Stain. After the band's name was changed to Lit later in 1995, the song was released on their 1997 debut album, Tripping the Light Fantastic.)	Tripping the Light Fantastic
1997	"Bitter"	Tripping the Light Fantastic
1999	"My Own Worst Enemy"	A Place in the Sun
1999	"Zip-Lock" (featuring blink-182 and Dee Snider of Twisted Sister)	A Place in the Sun
2000	"Miserable" (featuring Pamela Anderson)	A Place in the Sun
2000	"Over My Head"	Atomic
2000	"Four"	A Place in the Sun
2000	"The Best Is Yet to Come Undone"	A Place in the Sun
2001	"Lipstick and Bruises"	Atomic
2002	"Something to Someone"	Atomic
2003	"Live For This"	Atomic
2004	"Looks Like They Were Right"	Lit
2004	"Too Fast For A U-Turn"	Lit
2006	"Needle & Thread"	Lit
2009	"Here's To Us" (Allen Shellenberger tribute video) (Note: "Here's to Us" was first recorded as a demo for the Allen Shellenberger tribute video. The final version of the song was included on their fifth album, The View from the Bottom.)	The View from the Bottom
2011	"You Tonight" (demo version) (Note: The demo version of "You Tonight" is a different recording from the final version of the song included on their fifth album, The View from the Bottom.)	The View from the Bottom
2012	"The Broken"	The View from the Bottom
2013	"Miss You Gone"	The View from the Bottom
2016	"Fast"	These Are the Days
2018	"Good Problem to Have"	These Are the Days
2020	"Get Back"	N/A
2021	"Yeah Yeah Yeah"	Tastes Like Gold
2022	"Mouth Shut" (featuring Adrian Young)	Tastes Like Gold

== Soundtrack appearances ==
Year	Soundtrack	Song(s)
2000	Ready to Rumble	"My Own Worst Enemy"
2000	Jarrett & Labonte Stock Car Racing	"No Big Thing"
2000	The Replacements	"Zip-Lock"
2000	Little Nicky	"Perfect One"
2000	Titan A.E.	"Over My Head"
2001	American Pie 2	"The Last Time Again" and "A Place in the Sun"
2001	Out Cold	"Lipstick and Bruises"
2002	Orange County	"Everything's Cool"
2002	Clockstoppers	"Quicksand"
2002	Triple Play 2002	"I Wanna Rock"
2002	Mr. Deeds	"Happy in the Meantime" (Remix)
2002	Crossroads	"Lipstick and Bruises"
2008	Rock Band 2	"My Own Worst Enemy"
