= Platinum & Gold Collection (Lit album) =

Greatest hits album by Lit
- Released: May 4, 2004
- Genre: Pop punk alternative rock
- Length: 40:58
- Label: RCA, Dirty Martini
- Producer: Lit, Don Gilmore

Lit chronology
Atomic (2001)	Platinum & Gold Collection (2004)	Lit (2004)

Professional ratings
Review scores
Source	Rating
Allmusic	3.5/5 stars

Platinum & Gold Collection is a compilation of Lit's greatest hits, released on May 4, 2004, by RCA Records. It contains material from their A Place in the Sun and Atomic albums.

== Track listing ==
All tracks are written by Jeremy Popoff and A. Jay Popoff, with additional co-writing on "Happy in the Meantime" (remix) by Danny Walker.

No.	Title	Length
1.	"Something to Someone"	4:50
2.	"My Own Worst Enemy"	2:49
3.	"Quicksand"	3:17
4.	"Miserable"	4:17
5.	"Lipstick and Bruises"	3:01
6.	"Happy in the Meantime" (remix)	2:45
7.	"Over My Head"	3:40
8.	"Zip-Lock"	3:33
9.	"Addicted"	2:57
10.	"Four"	3:22
11.	"The Party's Over"	2:42
12.	"Down" (acoustic)	3:45
Total length:		40:58

== Personnel ==
- A. Jay Popoff – lead vocals
- Jeremy Popoff – guitar, backing vocals
- Kevin Baldes – bass
- Allen Shellenberger – drums
