= Radio edit =

Modification of a song for broadcast

In music, a radio edit, a radio mix, or a "clean version," is a modification, typically truncated or censored, intended to make a song more suitable for airplay and radio. It may be censored for profanity, vulgarities, words or a subject matter; or adjusted for length, instrumentation, or form. Radio edits may also be used for commercials, videos, TV shows, movies, events, video games, and single release radio versions, which may be denoted as the 7″ version (as opposed to the 12″ version, which is an extended version of a song). However, not all "radio edit" tracks are played on the radio.

== Time constraints ==
Radio edits often shorten a long song to make it more commercially viable for radio stations. The normal length for songs played on the radio is between three and five minutes. The amount of cut content differs, ranging from a few seconds to nearly half of the song. It is common for radio edits to have shortened intros and/or outros. In the intro, any kind of musical buildup is removed, or if there is no such buildup, an extensive intro is often halved. In the outro, a song may simply fade out earlier, common on tracks with long instrumental endings, or, if it does not fade out, a part before the ending will be cut or faded. If necessary, many radio edits will also edit out verses, choruses, bridges, or interludes in between. An example is the radio edit of David Bowie's "'Heroes'", which fades in shortly before the beginning of the third verse and fades out shortly before the vocal vamping at the end of the song.

Some songs are remixed heavily for radio edits and feature different arrangements than the original longer versions, occasionally even being completely different to the studio recordings. A popular example of this is "Revolution" by the Beatles, a completely different recording from the version ("Revolution 1") which appears on their White Album.

Some lengthy songs do not have a radio edit, despite being as long as 5–8 minutes in length. Examples of this include: "Vicarious" by Tool at 7:06, "Hey Jude" by the Beatles at 7:11, and "Stairway to Heaven" by Led Zeppelin at 8:03. The idea of extended songs receiving airplay on commercial radio was extremely rare until the birth of progressive radio in the mid-1960s; most rock music formats descend from progressive radio, and as such, rock songs tend to be played at their original length, longer than songs of other genres.

On rare occasions, a radio edit may even be longer than the original album version. This may occur when the song is edited for form, such as in the cases of "Creep" by Radiohead, "2 On" by Tinashe, and "Miserable" by Lit. "Creep"'s radio edit has a four-second drumstick count off before the regular first second, "2 On" repeats part of the chorus one more time than it does on the original album version, and "Miserable"'s radio edit adds the chorus between the first and second verses. Some radio edits lengthen some parts of the song while shortening others. For example, the radio edit of "Thinking Out Loud" by Ed Sheeran has a six-second introduction before the first verse but later in the song cuts from the end of the second verse to the beginning of the last chorus, omitting the second chorus and the guitar solo.

The syndicated radio format "QuickHitz", notably adopted and then quickly abandoned by the Calgary radio station CKMP-FM in August–September 2014, utilized even shorter edits of songs, from 1 minute 30 seconds to 2 minutes in length.

== Offensive content ==
Lily Allen, Fuck You (radio edit)
The radio edit version of "Fuck You" by Lily Allen uses sound effects in place of the word 'fuck'

Radio edits often come with any necessary censorship that is done to conform the decency standards imposed by government agencies, such as the Federal Communications Commission in the United States, the Canadian Radio-television and Telecommunications Commission in Canada, the Kapisanan ng mga Brodkaster ng Pilipinas in the Philippines, the Korea Communications Commission in South Korea, the Australian Communications and Media Authority in Australia, and Ofcom in the United Kingdom. The offending words in many of the songs may be silenced, reversed, distorted, replaced by different words, replaced by a bleep sound or replaced with a sound effect. The edits may come from the record label itself, broadcasters at the corporate level before the song is sent for airplay to their stations, or in rarer cases, at a radio station itself depending on local standards.

Radio edits may have more or fewer words edited than the "clean version", because of the stations' or agencies' standards. A "dirty" radio edit preserving the sound of the offensive word or words but maintaining the shorter play time may be produced, which may be aimed at club play, nighttime radio, and non-terrestrial radio stations. After two million copies of Michael Jackson's "They Don't Care About Us" (1996) had already been shipped, the lyrics of the original track with the words "Jew me" and "kike me" were replaced with "do me" and "strike me" due to its controversial antisemitic references. Radio edit versions of the track remained with the original version until the edited version was pressed and released. An example occurs in Lady Gaga's song "Poker Face" (2008), where the line "P-p-p-poker face, f-f-fuck her face" has barely noticeable profanities. Some radio stations repeated the word "poker" from the first part of the line, while others played the original version. A promotional original audio recording studio radio version is available containing both of these versions. The edited version is also available on the compilation Now That's What I Call Music! 31 in the US, and the whole chorus of Cee Lo Green's "Fuck You" substituted the word "Fuck" with "Forget", thus changing the title to "Forget You" on the radio edit.

In an unusual case, Lizzo's "Truth Hurts" (2017) was edited locally in June 2019 by the market-leading Top 40 station WIXX in Green Bay, Wisconsin, not because of inappropriate content, but due to Lizzo's reference in a lyric to an unnamed new player on the Minnesota Vikings. As WIXX is one of three flagship stations for the Green Bay Packers' radio network and features wraparound content involving the Packers, the station determined that referencing their hometown football team's closest rival positively would be jarring to local listeners.

Some individual stations may be more lenient with words that tread the broadcast-appropriate line, depending on their management and programming format; for instance, a rhythmic AC, classic hits, adult contemporary or urban contemporary station may indeed make several radio edits to a song to appeal to a broad base of listeners, while a rhythmic contemporary, modern rock or hip hop-focused station might be more apt to have a light hand in their radio edits to appeal both to listeners and artists who would be favorable to the station's reputation. Some edits might even be done for promotional reasons; for instance a song that mentions a city's name or a certain radio station might see a special 'station cut' where the station and its community are mentioned in the song (as heard in Lady Gaga's "You and I" (2011), which has a reference to Nebraska that is easily substituted with another region, state or city; similarly, Sia's "Cheap Thrills" (2015) is sometimes edited to replace the line "turn the radio on" with "...turn [station name] on" to promote the radio station on which the song is playing).

== See also ==
- Censorship on MTV
- Clear Channel memorandum
- Loudness war
- Parental Advisory
