= Ziplock =

Ziplock may refer to:

- Ziploc, a brand of reusable plastic, re-sealable storage bags and containers
- "Ziplock", a song by Gwen Stefani
- "Ziplock", a song by Ice-T
- "Zip-Lock" (song), a song by the American pop punk band Lit
