= Out Cold (2001 film) =

2001 film by The Malloys

- Theatrical release poster
- Directed by: The Malloys
- Written by: Jon Zack
- Produced by: Lee R. Mayes; Michael Aguilar; Jonathan Glickman
- Starring: Jason London; Willie Garson; Lee Majors
- Cinematography: Richard Crudo
- Edited by: Jeffrey Wolf
- Music by: Michael Andrews
- Production companies: Touchstone Pictures; Spyglass Entertainment; The Donners' Company; Barber/Birnbaum
- Distributed by: Buena Vista Pictures Distribution
- Release date: November 21, 2001
- Running time: 89 minutes
- Country: United States
- Language: English
- Budget: $24 million
- Box office: $14.8 million

Out Cold is a 2001 American comedy film directed by the music video sibling directing team The Malloys (in their theatrical film directorial debut). Starring Jason London, Willie Garson and Lee Majors, the film is about a group of snowboarders in Alaska. It presents itself as a parody of 1990s "ski school" films and makes a number of references to the film Casablanca.

== Plot ==
Rick Rambis, best friend Luke, and other friends Anthony, "Pig Pen", Jenny, Lance and Stumpy, all live and work at a ski resort on Bull Mountain in Alaska. The mountain and resort were founded by Herbert "Papa" Muntz who stole the land from the Eskimos and loved to drink and ski at the same time until he died doing so. His son, Ted, took over the mountain and plans to sell it to wealthy Colorado ski resort tycoon John Majors. In addition to being friends, Rick has romantic designs on Jenny, but is held back as he is still getting over his ex, Anna, who mysteriously disappeared after 3 weeks of summer love in Mexico.

After arriving at the mountain, John Majors plans to change the mountain name and turn the ski village into a first class resort but seeks Rick's help in getting his rowdy friends in line so as not to scare off his investors. John brings with him to the mountain his daughters, Inga, a Swiss ski bunny, and Anna, Rick's summer fling. After Anna's arrival, Rick then gets drunk and misses his date with Jenny. Later, Anna explains she left Rick in Mexico because she was already engaged to a doctor named Barry, who suffered an injury during the X Games, now a wheelchair user, and that Rick was the other man. Majors begins to make major changes to the town and mountain, such as changing the dive bar to an upscale club called Powder Room, removing the statue of Papa Muntz from the center of the town, and evicting some folks from their homes. Majors offers Rick a contract to be his new manager and Rick agrees on the condition that his friends all get to stay. After a massive party and drinking binge that resulted in Majors Hummer being vandalized, Majors has Ted fire them at the threat of backing out of the deal. Rick finds out about the firing of his friends and quits his job.

The rest of the crew consider leaving for Anchorage and Lance, who originally owned the bar, comes out as gay. As they were prepared to fly off on Barry's plane, Rick arrives and gives an inspirational speech about how the mountain is their home and not letting Majors ruin the memory of Papa Muntz, they all grab their snowboards and head for the mountain while Pig Pen reveals his feelings to Inga. The group of friends then cause bedlam at the festivities while Pig Pen and Inga are making out in one of the new gondolas and Major is outraged at Rick's betrayal. Rick frees Anna from her father and takes her to a highway where Barry lands his plane. Rick tells Anna what they had in Mexico was special but that he realized she belongs with Barry and Rick watches Anna fly away. The friends defeat Majors and Ted decides he is no longer selling the mountain as he rips up the contract. Stumpy, the local patron, attempts to tow the statue of Papa Muntz back up the hill, but the chain breaks and the statue rolls back toward town, knocking Majors in the snow. Majors is then roped by Lance who dragged him in the snow via snowmobile and sent him into a port-a-potty, which crashed into the trees. Rick asks Jenny out again after revealing he no longer thinks of Anna while snowboarding together.

== Cast ==
- Jason London as Rick Rambis, a snowboarder and instructor on Bull Mountain who is considered the de facto leader among the residence
- Lee Majors as John Majors, a wealthy resort tycoon from Colorado seeking to buy Bull Mountain and make major changes to it
- Willie Garson as Ted Muntz, the socially inept son of Papa Muntz who seeks to sell Bull Mountain
- Zach Galifianakis as Luke, Rick's snowboarding buddy who is known to pass out after being drunk
- David Koechner as Stumpy, a resident loyal to Papa Muntz's legacy
- Flex Alexander as Anthony, Rick's buddy who possesses a fear of snowboarding
- A. J. Cook as Jenny, a snowboarder whom Rick has an affection for
- David Denman as Lance, a closeted-gay bartender who owns El Matador
- Caroline Dhavernas as Anna, Majors stepdaughter from France whom Rick had a romantic fling with in Mexico
- Derek Hamilton as Pig Pen, Rick's mental-issued and love shy snowboarding buddy who operates the gondola lifts
- Thomas Lennon as Eric Montclare, Ted's assistant who takes his Snownook role seriously
- Victoria Silvstedt as Inga, Majors stepdaughter from Switzerland
- Todd Richards as Barry, Anna's fiancé who is a doctor and wheelchair user
- Lewis Arquette as Herbert 'Papa' Muntz, the late founder of Bull Mountain
- Rob "Sluggo" Boyce as Snownook Guy
- Rio Tahara as Tetsuo
- Brett Kelly as Toby
- Lee R. Mayes as Whitey
- Danny Hagge as Stewart
- Adam Harrington as Team Snownook Leader
- Ted Stryker as Tourist Dude in Line-Up
- Steve Kahan as Powder Room Bartender
- Richard Donner as Snooty Bartender (uncredited)

== Soundtrack ==
The Out Cold soundtrack is a 12-track compilation of songs from the film. It is available on the RCA record label. The Weezer song "Island in the Sun" plays an important part in the film but is left off the soundtrack.

| No. | Title | Writer(s) | Producer(s) | Length |
|---|---|---|---|---|
| 1. | "Anytime" (Eve 6) | Max Collins (lyrics); Eve 6 (music) | Don Gilmore | 3:21 |
| 2. | "Makes No Difference" (Sum 41) | Sum 41 | | 3:09 |
| 3. | "Win or Lose" (Foo Fighters) | Dave Grohl | Foo Fighters; Nick Raskulinecz | 3:27 |
| 4. | "Ev Rebahadee" (will.i.am and Planet Asia) | William Adams; Jason Green | | 4:12 |
| 5. | "Posters" (Jack Johnson) | Jack Johnson | JP Plunier; Mario Caldato Jr. (add.); Jack Johnson (add.) | 3:08 |
| 6. | "Funk No. 49" (James Gang) | Joe Walsh; Jim Fox; Dale Peters | | 3:50 |
| 7. | "Lipstick and Bruises" (Lit) | Jeremy Popoff; A. Jay Popoff | Don Gilmore; Lit | 3:01 |
| 8. | "She Is Beautiful" (Andrew W.K.) | Andrew W.K. | | 3:36 |
| 9. | "Hear You Me" (Jimmy Eat World) | Jimmy Eat World | | 4:42 |
| 10. | "Green Light Girl (Rock Remix)" (Doyle Bramhall II and Smokestack) | Doyle Bramhall II; Susannah Melvoin | Jim Scott | 3:06 |
| 11. | "For Anyone" (The Color Red) | The Color Red | The Color Red; Matt Gruber | 4:05 |
| 12. | "Makin' Money" (Handsome Devil) | Danny Walker | Jeremy Popoff; Handsome Devil | 3:31 |

== Reception ==
Out Cold has an 8% approval rating on Rotten Tomatoes, a review aggregator, based on 49 reviews; the average rating is 2.9/10. The site's consensus reads: "A party movie that substitutes surfs for snow, Out Cold will leave viewers just that with its gross-out humor and sophomoric plot." Metacritic, which uses a weighted average, assigned the film a score of 22 out of 100, based on 15 critics, indicating "generally unfavorable" reviews.

However, the movie holds an 84% fan approval rating on Rotten Tomatoes, compiled from over 25,000 audience ratings. The movie is considered a comedy cult classic among snowboarding enthusiasts and from its multiple broadcasts on Comedy Central.
