= Five Smokin' Tracks from Lit =

EP by Lit
- Released: December 10, 1996
- Genres: Grunge; heavy metal; punk rock
- Length: 17:50
- Label: Malicious Vinyl
- Producers: Matt Gruber; Lit

Lit chronology
Five Smokin' Tracks from Lit (1996)	Tripping the Light Fantastic (1997)

Professional ratings
Review scores
Source	Rating
Allmusic	3/5 stars

Five Smokin' Tracks from Lit is an EP by the rock band Lit. It was released on December 10, 1996 on the Malicious Vinyl label.

== Track listing ==
All tracks are written by Jeremy Popoff and A. Jay Popoff, except "No Big Thing," written by Jeremy Popoff, and "Stain," written by Kurt Cobain.

No.	Title	Length
1.	"Bitter"	3:30
2.	"Fireman"	4:08
3.	"No Big Thing"	2:38
4.	"Beginning"	3:07
5.	"Stain" (Nirvana cover)	4:27
Total length:		17:50

== Personnel ==
Credits are adapted from the album's liner notes.

- A Jay Popoff – vocals
- Jeremy Popoff – guitar, backing vocals
- Kevin Baldes – bass
- Allen Shellenberger – drums

== Production ==
- Produced by Lit and Matt Gruber
- Recorded and mixed by Matt Gruber
- Recorded at Grand Master and Hollywood Sound
- Mixed at Scream and Hollywood Sound
- 2nd Engineers – Todd Burke, Bruan Davis, and Ralph Cacciaurri
- 2nd Mix Engineers – Ryan Boesch and Doug Trantow
- Assisted by Josh Turner
- Back Cover Photo – Jeff Bender
- Cadillac Photo – Glen Laferman
- Design – StudioSee
