= Atomic (Lit album) =

Studio album by Lit
- Released: October 16, 2001
- Recorded: 2000
- Studios: NRG Studios, North Hollywood, CA.
- Genres: Alternative rock; pop punk
- Length: 44:45
- Labels: RCA; Dirty Martini
- Producers: Don Gilmore; Lit; Glen Ballard

Lit chronology
| A Place in the Sun (1999) | Atomic (2001) | Platinum & Gold Collection (2004) |

Singles from Atomic
- 1. "Over My Head" Released: June 6, 2000; 2. "Lipstick and Bruises" Released: October 16, 2001; 3. "Addicted" Released: 2002

Professional ratings
Aggregate scores
| Source | Rating |
|---|---|
| Metacritic | (61/100) |
Review scores
| Source | Rating |
| AllMusic | 3/5 stars |
| Blender | 4/5 stars |
| Melodic | 4/5 stars |
| Q | 3/5 stars |
| Spin | (5/10) |

Atomic is the third studio album by the American rock band Lit, released on October 16, 2001 by Dirty Martini and RCA Records. The album peaked at #36 on the US Billboard 200.

== Track listing ==
All tracks are written by Jeremy Popoff and A. Jay Popoff, except 2 and 8 (music by J. Popoff; lyrics by J. Popoff, A. Popoff, Butch Walker), 6 (J. Popoff, A. Popoff, Danny Walker), 9 (music by Kevin Baldes, J. Popoff; lyrics by J. Popoff, A. Popoff, D. Walker), 11 (J. Popoff, A. Popoff, Glen Ballard), and 12 (J. Popoff, A. Popoff, Baldes). Produced by Don Gilmore (1–12), Ballard (13), and Lit (all tracks).

| No. | Title | Length |
|---|---|---|
| 1. | "Something to Someone" | 4:49 |
| 2. | "The Last Time Again" | 3:17 |
| 3. | "Addicted" | 2:56 |
| 4. | "Lipstick and Bruises" | 3:00 |
| 5. | "Everything's Cool" | 3:13 |
| 6. | "Happy in the Meantime" | 2:49 |
| 7. | "Drop D" | 3:27 |
| 8. | "Sunny Weather" | 3:13 |
| 9. | "Next Time Around" | 3:04 |
| 10. | "Slip" | 4:00 |
| 11. | "She Comes" | 3:56 |
| 12. | "Live for This" | 3:21 |
| 13. | "Over My Head" | 3:40 |
| Total length: | | 44:53 |

=== Bonus CD ===
A limited edition release of Atomic had a bonus disc with three tracks by bands from Lit's Dirty Martini label.

| No. | Title | Writer(s) | Artist | Length |
|---|---|---|---|---|
| 1. | "Down" (acoustic version) | Jeremy Popoff; A. Jay Popoff | Lit | 3:46 |
| 2. | "Makin' Money" (clean version) | Danny Walker | Handsome Devil | 3:30 |
| 3. | "Sore Throat" (demo version) | Meyer; Schartoff; The Color Red; Verloop; J. Zamora; M. Zamora | The Color Red | 5:52 |
| Total length: | | | | 13:08 |

=== B-sides ===
- "The Party's Over" (
  - J. Popoff
  - A. Popoff
  - B. Walker
  ) – 2:42
- "Chain of Fools" (Aretha Franklin cover) (added as a bonus track in the European edition)
- "I Wanna Rock" (Twisted Sister)
- "Father Christmas" (The Kinks)
- "Happy in the Meantime” (Remix)

== Personnel ==
Credits are adapted from the album's liner notes.

Lit

- A. Jay Popoff – lead vocals
- Jeremy Popoff – guitar, backing vocals
- Kevin Baldes – bass
- Allen Shellenberger – drums

Additional musicians

- David Campbell – string arrangement and string section member on "Happy in the Meantime"
- Larry Corbett – string section member on "Happy in the Meantime"
- Joel Derouin – string section member on "Happy in the Meantime"
- James Ehreinger – organ on "Sunny Weather"
- Don Gilmore – backing vocals
- Marvin Gordy III – string section member on "Happy in the Meantime"
- Gabrial McNair – synthesizer on "The Last Time Again" and "She Comes"
- Niels Bye Nielsen – orchestra on "Slip"
- Rachel Purkin – string section member on "Happy in the Meantime"
- Steven Tyler – backing vocals on "Over My Head"
- Danny Walker – additional lead guitar on "Next Time Around"

Production

- All tracks except "Over My Head" are produced by Don Gilmore and Lit
- "Over My Head" is produced by Glen Ballard and Lit

== Charts ==
| Chart (2001) | Peak position |
|---|---|
| US Billboard 200 | 36 |
