= Katsuya Tahara =

Japanese snowboarder (born 1972)

Personal information
- Full name: Katsuya Tahara
- Born: September 10, 1972 (age 53)

Sport
- Country: Japan
- Sport: Snowboarding

Katsuya Tahara (田原 勝也, Tahara Katsuya; born 10 September 1972) is a Japanese snowboarder. Generally, he is called Rio Tahara (ライオ田原, Raio Tahara).

Tahara is from Nagano Prefecture. He was ranked Asian Best Player by ISF from 1998 to 2001. He was noted for his proficiency with the Rodeo flip and Haakon flip.

Rio participated in X-Trail Jam seven times and received the "Highest Air" award in the quarter pipe event in 2003, recording a 5.40m jump, and again in 2004, recording a 5.20m jump.

He also made a cameo appearance in the movie Out Cold.

Tahara retired in 2008.
