= The View from the Bottom =

Studio album by Lit
- Released: June 19, 2012
- Recorded: 2010–2012
- Genres: Alternative rock; pop punk
- Length: 42:58
- Label: Megaforce
- Producer: Butch Walker

Lit chronology
Lit (2004)	The View from the Bottom (2012)	These Are the Days (2017)

Singles from The View from the Bottom
- 1. "You Tonight" Released: May 1, 2012; 2. "The Broken" Released: August 2012

The View from the Bottom is the fifth studio album by the American rock band Lit. It was released on June 19, 2012, by Megaforce Records. It was the band's first new album in eight years, after the release of the Lit album in 2004 and the death of their drummer Allen Shellenberger in 2009. The album is dedicated to Shellenberger's memory. In addition to being dedicated to Shellenberger, the album also features a track called "Here’s to Us", which is a tribute to him. It is the first album with the rhythm guitarist Ryan Gillmor and the only one with Nathan Walker on drums.

== Background ==
After the band released their fourth album, Lit in 2004, the band was hit with a number of hardships. A. Jay and Jeremy Popoff's stepfather died in a motorcycle crash that also severely injured their mother. While the band continued touring, eventually, in 2008, the band's drummer Allen Shellenberger, was diagnosed with a brain tumor and died the following year. After his death, Lit was unsure whether or not to continue as a band. The remaining members, during New Year's Eve in 2009, met at the bar they run, "The Slidebar", and decided to continue as a band and to make a fifth album. The album features a track called "Here’s to Us", which is a tribute to Shellenberger. This version is a re-recorded and reworked version of the same song that was featured in a slideshow on the band’s YouTube page. The pictures in the slideshow featured the band and Shellenberger.

== Writing and recording ==
The band began writing new material in various sessions in 2010 and 2011. They chose Nathan Walker, who had been both a close friend to the band and their drum tech, to fill in on drums. Ryan Gilmor was brought in as a new, fifth band member, to "round out the band's sound" as a rhythm guitarist and keyboard player. In late 2011, the band began recording with the producer Butch Walker. They extensively demoed songs and wrote many more than would appear on the album, both firsts for the band in the recording process. The album was primarily recorded live in the studio.

== Release and promotion ==
"Same Shit, Different Drink" was made available for free download on Rolling Stone's website in April 2012.

The first single, "You Tonight", was released on iTunes on May 1, 2012, and the album was released on June 19, 2012.

To promote the album's release, the band went on the Summerland Tour with Everclear, Sugar Ray, Gin Blossoms and Marcy Playground.

"Miss You Gone" was released to radio on August 7, 2012. A video for the single "The Broken" was released on August 16, 2012, and a video for "Miss You Gone" was released on June 13, 2013.

== Reception ==
Professional ratings
Review scores
Source	Rating
AllMusic	3.5/5 stars
Melodic	3.5/5 stars
Rock Sound	6/10
Rolling Stone	2/5 stars

The album received mixed reviews. Matt Collar at AllMusic praised the album, giving it a 3.5 out of 5 rating, stating "...one gets the sense that Lit are re-engaged here both emotionally and creatively...Ultimately, while the album may be about the band's View from the Bottom (whether that be career woes, the loss of a friend, or the bottom of a shot glass), as the title of the rousing set closer implies, Lit definitely got it "Right This Time." However, Chuck Eddy of Rolling Stone was less enthusiastic, giving it only 2 out of 5 stars, claiming that the "riffs sound re-purposed for sports and strip bars."

Emily Kearns from Rock Sound, while only awarding it 6 out of 10, praised the album for being "polished fare awash with slick harmonies, clean guitars, heavy drumbeats, giant hooks and an unadulterated wall of gleaming pop – much of which is laced with a sense of melancholy."

== Track listing ==
All tracks are written by Jeremy Popoff and A. Jay Popoff, with additional co-writers as noted.

No.	Title	Writer(s)	Length
1.	"C'mon"	Gavin Brown	4:21
2.	"You Tonight"	Kevin Baldes; Marti Frederiksen	3:12
3.	"Same Shit, Different Drink"	Butch Walker	3:20
4.	"Miss You Gone"	Matt Bair	3:10
5.	"The Broken"	Ryan Gillmor; Blair Daly	3:24
6.	"She Don't Know"	Gillmor	3:42
7.	"Nothing's Free"	Gillmor; Brad Warren; Brett Warren	3:42
8.	"You Did It"	Gillmor; Kay Hanley	3:53
9.	"Partner in Crime"	Gillmor; Daly	3:35
10.	"Here's to Us"	Blu Sanders	3:33
11.	"The Wall"	Gillmor; Jon Stone	4:06
12.	"Right This Time"	Gillmor; Daly	3:00
Total length:			42:58

== Personnel ==
Credits are adapted from the album's liner notes.

Lit

- A. Jay Popoff – lead vocals
- Jeremy Popoff – guitar, backing vocals
- Ryan Gillmor – guitar, backing vocals
- Kevin Baldes – bass, backing vocals
- Nathan Walker – drums

Additional musicians

- Michael Eisenstein – additional guitar
- Jason Freese – additional keyboards, string arrangement
- Butch Walker – additional guitar, piano, percussion, backing vocals
- Patrick Warren – string arrangement

== Charts ==
Chart (2012)	Peak position
US Independent Albums (Billboard)	41
US Top Current Album Sales (Billboard)	167
