= Tastes Like Gold =

Studio album by Lit
- Released: June 17, 2022
- Length: 37:41
- Label: Round Hill
- Producers: Carlo Colasacco; Lit; Youthyear

Lit chronology
These Are the Days (2017)	Tastes Like Gold (2022)

Singles from Tastes Like Gold
- 1. "Yeah Yeah Yeah" Released: October 26, 2021

Tastes Like Gold is the seventh studio album by the American rock band Lit. It is the band's first and only album with drummer Taylor Carroll. Tastes Like Gold showcases the band returning to their alternative rock sound after a brief venture into country rock on their previous album These Are the Days.

== Track listing ==
All tracks are written by Carlo Colasacco, Eric Paquette, A. Jay Popoff, and Jeremy Popoff, except where noted.

No.	Title	Writer(s)	Length
1.	"Yeah Yeah Yeah"		2:29
2.	"Mouth Shut" (featuring Adrian Young)		2:41
3.	"Do It Again"		3:11
4.	"Kicked Off the Plane"	Colasacco; Mike Nadeau; Paquette; A. Popoff; J. Popoff	3:03
5.	"Ok with That"		3:51
6.	"The Life That I Got" (featuring American Authors)	Zac Barnett; Colasacco; Paquette; A. Popoff; J. Popoff; Matt Sanchez	2:40
7.	"Get Out of My Song"	Colasacco; Paquette; A. Popoff; J. Popoff; Matt Squire	3:06
8.	"Tastes Like Gold"	Colasacco; Paquette; A. Popoff; J. Popoff; Eben Wares	3:33
9.	"Here's to Another"	Colasacco; Marti Frederiksen; A. Popoff; J. Popoff	2:39
10.	"Hold That Thought"	Colasacco; Paquette; A. Popoff; J. Popoff; Wares	3:57
11.	"Out of It"		2:47
12.	"Let's Go" (The Cars cover, featuring Butch Walker)	Ric Ocasek	3:44
Total length:			37:41

== Personnel ==
Credits are adapted from the album's liner notes.

Lit

- A. Jay Popoff – lead vocals
- Jeremy Popoff – guitar, backing vocals
- Kevin Baldes – bass, backing vocals, album cover photography
- Taylor Carroll – drums

Production

- Neal Avron – mixing
- American Authors – additional engineering and editing
- Tim Brennan – additional engineering and editing
- Evan Frederiksen – additional engineering and editing
- Pete Lyman – mastering
- Moxy Brothers – additional engineering and editing
- Janoah Stolo – additional engineering and editing
- Produced by Carlo Colasacco, Lit, and Youthyear (Eric Paquette)

Artwork

- Nick Fancher – album photography of band
- Andy Sapp – graphic design
- Brit Turner – graphic design

Additional musicians

- Zac Barnett – backing vocals on "The Life That I Got"
- Jim "Moose" Brown – keyboards on "Get Out of My Song" and "Hold That Thought"
- Carlo Colasacco – guitar, keyboards, programming, backing vocals
- Jason Freese – keyboards on "Let's Go"
- Ryan Gillmor – guitar on "Let's Go"
- Sean Holland – guitar on "Let's Go"
- Jeff Lynch – backing vocals on Kicked Off the Plane," additional engineering and editing
- Rich Redmond – drums on "Hold That Thought"
- Matt Sanchez – backing vocals on "The Life That I Got"
- Butch Walker – guest vocals on "Let's Go"
- Adrian Young – drums on "Mouth Shut"
- Youthyear – guitar, keyboards, programming, backing vocals
