= Packers–Vikings rivalry =

National Football League rivalry

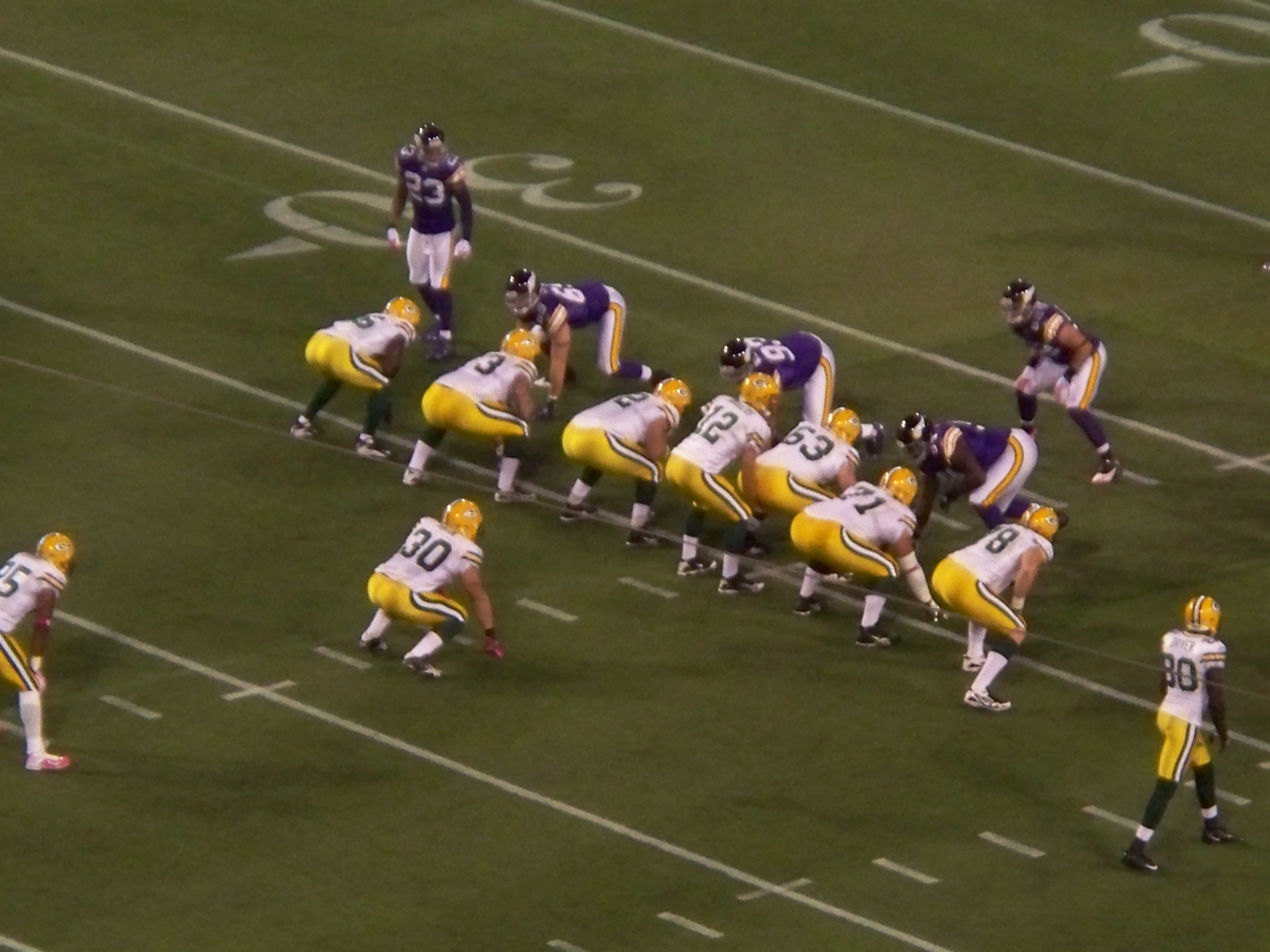
- The Packers and Vikings at the line of scrimmage in 2009

- Green Bay Packers Minnesota Vikings
- Location: Green Bay, Minneapolis
- First meeting: October 22, 1961; Packers 33, Vikings 7
- Latest meeting: November 15, 2026; Vikings 30, Packers 10
- Next meeting: 2027
- Stadiums: Packers: Lambeau Field; Vikings: U.S. Bank Stadium

Statistics
- Total meetings: 133
- All-time series: Packers: 67–63–3
- Regular season series: Packers: 66–62–3
- Postseason results: Tied: 1–1
- Largest victory: Packers: 45–7 (2011); Vikings: 42–7 (1986)
- Most points scored: Packers: 48 (1962); Vikings: 42 (1986)
- Longest win streak: Packers: 6 (1961–1963); Vikings: 7 (1975–1978)
- Current win streak: Vikings: 3 (2025–present)

Post-season history
- 2004 NFC Wild Card: Vikings won: 31–17; 2012 NFC Wild Card: Packers won: 24–10
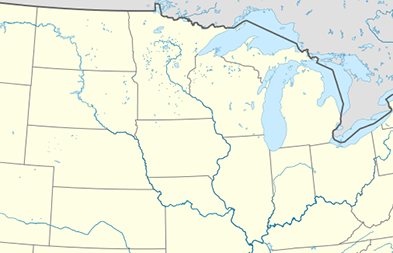

The Packers–Vikings rivalry is a National Football League (NFL) rivalry between the Green Bay Packers and the Minnesota Vikings.

In the modern era, the Minnesota Vikings have been the biggest NFC North challenger to the Green Bay Packers. While the Packers have won almost 75% of their games against the Chicago Bears and Detroit Lions since the beginning of quarterback Brett Favre’s first season in 1992, they have only won ~50% of their games against the Vikings (going 35–31–2 in that period). CBS ranked it the #3 NFL rivalry of the 2000s.

The Packers lead the overall series, 67–63–3. The two teams have met twice in the playoffs, winning one each.

== Notable moments and games ==
- The Packers, under coach Vince Lombardi beat the Vikings in nine of the first ten meetings in Minnesota's first five seasons in the NFL (1961–1965). In Green Bay's two Super Bowl seasons under Lombardi (1966–67), the two teams split their semi-annual meetings. In Minnesota's four Super Bowl seasons (1969, 1973, 1974, 1976) the Vikings won seven of eight meetings with the Packers. Vikings' coach Bud Grant went 22–14–1 against the Packers.
- On September 26, 1993, the Vikings trailed the visiting Packers 13–12 with no timeouts and less than two minutes remaining on the clock. Needing a big play on 4th and 8 from their own 19, Minnesota quarterback Jim McMahon found Cris Carter for a 19-yard gain to keep the Vikings' drive alive. A couple more completions, mixed with three incomplete passes, set up a third-and-10 from mid-field with 14 seconds left. McMahon rolled right to avoid the rush, when suddenly he spotted rookie wide receiver Eric Guliford who was wide open by 20 yards. McMahon then connected on a 45-yard bomb with 6 seconds left to play before Mike Prior could force Guliford out of bounds. That would set up Fuad Reveiz's fifth field goal of the game, lifting the Vikings to a 15–13 victory. It was Guliford's only catch in his two seasons with the Vikings.
- On October 5, 1998 Vikings rookie Randy Moss made his Monday Night Football debut at Lambeau Field and had five catches for 190 yards and two touchdowns. Randall Cunningham had two additional touchdown throws and Gary Anderson kicked three field goals in a 37–24 Vikings win. Favre threw three interceptions and was benched for Doug Pederson, who threw a pair of fourth-quarter touchdowns. The loss ended an 18-game winning streak for the Packers at Lambeau Field, dating back to 1995.
- In a Monday Night Football game on November 6, 2000, the Packers and Vikings were tied at 20 in overtime when Brett Favre threw a long pass that Vikings cornerback Cris Dishman deflected towards Antonio Freeman, who was on the ground. The ball went straight from Dishman to Freeman's shoulder, who then rolled over to make the catch at the 15-yard line, and took it for the touchdown and the 26–20 win. This prompted commentator Al Michaels to famously utter, "He did what?"
- On December 24, 2004 the Packers traveled to the Metrodome for a Week 16 matchup that would determine the 2004 NFC North champion. Both teams entered the game with 8–6 records. The Vikings took a 31–24 lead midway through the fourth quarter, but the Packers mounted a late comeback to tie the game with 3:34 remaining. The Packers then drove down the field and won the game on a 29-yard field goal from Ryan Longwell as time expired. It was the second time in the season that Longwell had kicked a last-second field goal to give the Packers a 34–31 win over the Vikings.
- January 9, 2005 marked the first time that the two clubs played each other in the playoffs. The Vikings jumped to an early lead and won 31-17. In the 4th quarter after his second touchdown, Vikings wide receiver Randy Moss faux mooned Packer fans. In the moment, Fox announcer Joe Buck famously denounced the end zone celebration as "a disgusting act.”
- The week leading to the teams' 2007 Week Four match up at the Metrodome was talk of whether Brett Favre would break the all-time passing touchdown record. He had already tied the record the week before, therefore needing only one touchdown pass to break Dan Marino's all time record of 420. Favre broke the record in the first quarter on a 16-yard touchdown pass to Greg Jennings. The Packers went on to win the game 23–16.
- In week 10 of the 2007 season the Packers defeated the Vikings 34–0, for the second shutout of the series.
- A missed 52-yard field goal try by the Packers' Mason Crosby with 26 seconds remaining sealed a hard-fought 28–27 Vikings win at Hubert H. Humphrey Metrodome on November 9, 2008. Gus Frerotte overcame three interceptions (one returned 55 yards by the Packers' Nick Collins for a touchdown) to throw two touchdowns while Adrian Peterson rushed for 192 yards and the decisive touchdown with 2:22 to go in the fourth. Packers QB Aaron Rodgers threw for 142 yards but in the second quarter fumbled in the endzone and was flagged for intentional grounding, giving a safety to the Vikings; Jared Allen then sacked Rodgers in the Packers endzone with 52 seconds left in the first half for another Vikings safety.
- Monday Night Football earned the highest ratings in cable television history on October 5, 2009 when the Vikings hosted the Packers. The game was the first meeting between the Packers and their former quarterback Brett Favre. The Vikings took over the game when Aaron Rodgers was sacked at the Vikings 33-yard line and fumbled. The Vikings drove downfield as Adrian Peterson rushed six times for 26 yards and Favre threw five times, ending in a one-yard touchdown to Visanthe Shiancoe. Rodgers managed a 62-yard touchdown to Jermichael Finley, and after an exchange of touchdowns (a 14-yard Favre pass to Sidney Rice and a Clay Matthews strip-tackle of Peterson returned 42-yards) Favre raced the Vikings to the Packers redzone; a pass to the endzone was picked off but the play was nullified on pass interference, and one play later Peterson rushed in another score. The Vikings never let the Packers closer as they won 30–23, taking a 4–0 record in the 2009 season's first quarter.
- On October 24, 2010, the two teams met on Sunday Night Football Three Favre interceptions helped the Packers surge to a 28–24 lead but Favre led a late comeback; an end zone catch by Percy Harvin with 57 seconds remaining was nullified when review showed one foot out of bounds, and the Vikings failed to convert a touchdown in their final attempt. Favre suffered an injury to his left ankle that left his season in doubt and coach Brad Childress was livid with the officiating crew led by Scott Green. In the November 21 rematch, the Packers routed the Vikings 31–3 behind four Aaron Rodgers touchdown passes, making Rodgers 2–2 against Favre in his career. The loss dropped the Vikings to 3–7, all but eliminating them from playoff contention. Childress was fired by the Vikings the next day, and defensive coordinator Leslie Frazier was promoted to replace him. The Packers went on to win their fourth Super Bowl.

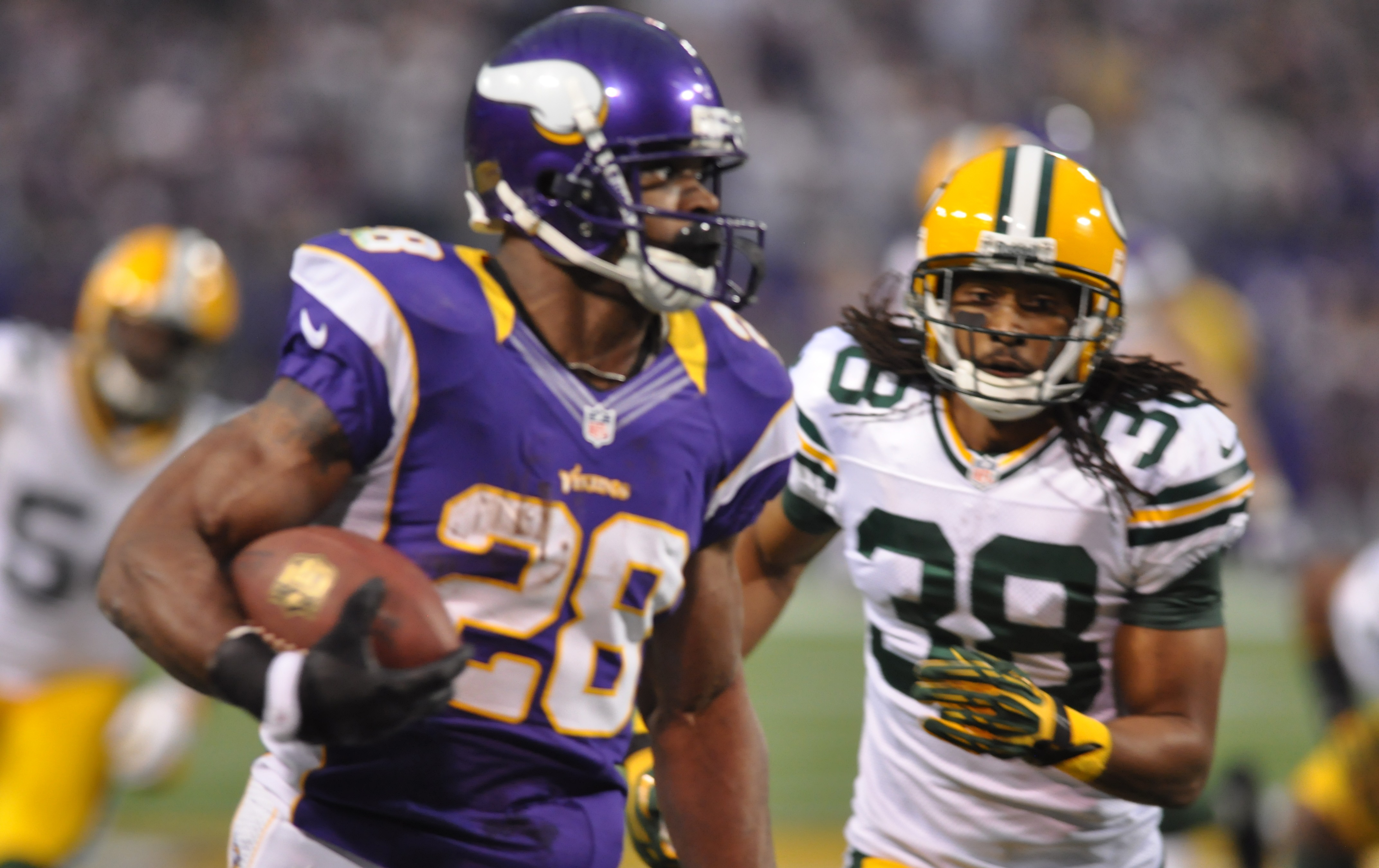
Adrian Peterson vs. Packers, December 30, 2012, the last game of his 2,097-yard season.

- Adrian Peterson came up nine yards short of breaking Eric Dickerson's 1984 rushing record but his late scamper set up the winning field goal in a 37–34 Vikings win on December 30, 2012. The Packers erased a 20–10 halftime gap but could not eke out a win, while the Vikings advanced to the playoffs as the NFC's sixth seed.
- On January 5, 2013 the Packers defeated the Vikings 24–10 in the Wild Card round just six days after falling to the Vikings in Week 17. The Packers were able to hold Adrian Peterson under 100 yards after he had run for 210 and 199 yards respectively in the first two meetings.
- The Packers and Vikings played for the division crown in Week 17 of the 2015 season at Lambeau Field. The Vikings won the contest 20–13, claiming their first division title since 2009 and breaking the Packers' four-year streak.
- In the first ever game in U.S. Bank Stadium, Week 2 of the 2016 season, the Vikings defeated the Packers 17–14 en route to a 5–0 start to the season. However, the Vikings went 3-8 the rest of the season and were eliminated from playoff contention with a 38-25 loss to the Packers at Lambeau Field in Week 16.
- The two teams faced off at U.S. Bank Stadium on October 15, 2017. Midway through the first quarter, Minnesota linebacker Anthony Barr tackled Aaron Rodgers, causing him to leave the game with a broken collarbone. Rodgers had surgery on October 19 and was placed on injured reserve, giving quarterback Brett Hundley the reins. The teams headed in opposite directions going forward, as the Packers' eight-year streak of playoff berths ended with a 7–9 record after starting 4–1, while the Vikings finished 13–3 and won the NFC North, losing to the eventual Super Bowl LII champion Philadelphia Eagles in the NFC Championship Game. The following offseason, a controversial rule change was introduced that would cause similar tackles to result in a roughing the passer penalty.
- On December 23, 2017, the Vikings won 16–0; the first time the Vikings shut out the Packers at Lambeau Field and Minnesota's first sweep of Green Bay since 2009. It was the second home shutout of the season for the Packers, who previously had not been shutout at home since 2006, following a 0–23 loss to the Baltimore Ravens.
- On December 23, 2019, the 11–3 Packers and 10–4 Vikings met at U.S. Bank Stadium for Monday Night Football that would have implications on NFC playoff seeding. A Packers win would clinch the NFC North, while a Vikings win would keep them in contention for the division title. Despite three turnovers in the first half from the Packers offense, they would eventually win 23–10 behind 3.5 sacks from OLB Za'Darius Smith and 154 rushing yards and two touchdowns from RB Aaron Jones. The win marked the first Packers win in Minnesota since 2015 and their first ever win at U.S. Bank Stadium. The Packers clinched the NFC North title, while the Vikings, having already clinched a playoff spot prior to the game due to a Rams loss, were locked in as the NFC's sixth seed.
- On December 29, 2024, the 11–4 Packers met the 13–2 Vikings at U.S. Bank Stadium for a game with major NFC playoff implications. Although both teams had already clinched playoff berths, a win by the Vikings would keep them in contention for the NFC North title, while a Packers win would give them a chance to leapfrog Minnesota in terms of playoff seeding. Vikings quarterback Sam Darnold threw for 377 yards and three touchdowns as the team raced out to a 27–10 lead in the fourth quarter, although a late Packers rally made the final score 27–25. The Vikings' win gave them their first sweep of Green Bay since 2017 and set up a winner-take-all NFC North title game against the Detroit Lions the following week, while the Packers, who had already been eliminated from division title contention the previous week, were assured to be the conference's sixth or seventh seed. Both teams would lose to each of their respective conference rivals in the Wild Card round; the Packers lost 22–10 to the Philadelphia Eagles, while the Vikings lost 27–9 to the Los Angeles Rams.
- On September 13, 2026, the teams met at U.S. Bank Stadium to open the season. After losing starting quarterback Kyler Murray to injury early in the first quarter, the Vikings struggled to move the ball and trailed the Packers 22–10 late in the third quarter before backup Carson Wentz threw a touchdown pass that cut the Packers' lead to 22–17. Early in the fourth quarter, Packers kicker Trey Smack appeared to convert a 40-yard field goal that would have given the Packers an eight-point lead, but an offsides penalty on the Vikings led Packers head coach Matt LaFleur to take the field goal off the board and attempt a quarterback sneak on fourth-and-one, which was unsuccessful. On the Vikings' next drive, the Packers committed three controversial defensive penalties, each nullifying a third-down stop, before running back Aaron Jones scored the go-ahead touchdown with 6:37 to play, giving the Vikings a lead that they would not relinquish as they went on to win 39–22 after scoring 29 unanswered points. The Vikings' win marked the first time in NFL history that a team won a game by at least 17 points after trailing by 12 or more in the final 20 minutes of regulation, while the Packers' loss continued their five-game losing streak from the previous season and marked the first time since the 1990–91 seasons that the team had lost six straight games.

== Season-by-season results ==
Green Bay Packers vs. Minnesota Vikings Season-by-Season Results
1960s (Packers, 11–7)

Season	Season series	at Green Bay Packers	at Minnesota Vikings	Overall series	Notes
1961	Packers 2–0	Packers; 28–10 †	Packers; 33–7	Packers; 2–0	Vikings join the National Football League (NFL) as an expansion team. They were placed in the NFL Western Conference, resulting in two meetings annually with the Packers. Packers win 1961 NFL Championship.
1962	Packers 2–0	Packers; 34–7	Packers; 48–21	Packers; 4–0	In Minnesota, Packers score their most points in a game against the Vikings. Packers win 1962 NFL Championship.
1963	Packers 2–0	Packers; 28–7	Packers; 37–28	Packers; 6–0	
1964	Tie 1–1	Vikings; 24–23	Packers; 42–13	Packers; 7–1	
1965	Packers 2–0	Packers; 24–19	Packers; 38–13	Packers; 9–1	Packers win 1965 NFL Championship.
1966	Tie 1–1	Vikings; 20–17	Packers; 28–16	Packers; 10–2	Vikings' win was the Packers' only home loss in the 1966 season. Packers win 1966 NFL Championship and Super Bowl I.
1967	Tie 1–1	Vikings; 10–7 †	Packers; 30–27	Packers; 11–3	As a result of expansion, the two eight-team divisions became two eight-team conferences split into two divisions, with the Packers and Vikings placed in the NFL Central division. Packers win 1967 NFL Championship and Super Bowl II.
1968	Vikings 2–0	Vikings; 26–13 †	Vikings; 14–10	Packers; 11–5	
1969	Vikings 2–0	Vikings; 9–7 †	Vikings; 19–7	Packers; 11–7	Vikings win 1969 NFL Championship, lose Super Bowl IV.
† Denotes a Packers home game played in Milwaukee

1970s (Vikings, 15–4–1)

Season	Season series	at Green Bay Packers	at Minnesota Vikings	Overall series	Notes
1970	Tie 1–1	Packers; 13–10 †	Vikings; 10–3	Packers; 12–8	As a result of the AFL–NFL merger, the Packers and Vikings are placed in the NFC Central (later renamed to the NFC North in the 2002 season).
1971	Vikings 2–0	Vikings; 24–13	Vikings; 3–0	Packers; 12–10	
1972	Tie 1–1	Vikings; 27–13	Packers; 23–7	Packers; 13–11	
1973	Vikings 2–0	Vikings; 31–7	Vikings; 11–3	Tie; 13–13	Vikings lose Super Bowl VIII.
1974	Tie 1–1	Vikings; 32–17	Packers; 19–7	Tie; 14–14	Vikings lose Super Bowl IX.
1975	Vikings 2–0	Vikings; 28–17	Vikings; 24–3	Vikings; 16–14	
1976	Vikings 2–0	Vikings; 17–10 †	Vikings; 20–9	Vikings; 18–14	Vikings lose Super Bowl XI.
1977	Vikings 2–0	Vikings; 13–6	Vikings; 19–7	Vikings; 20–14	
1978	Vikings 1–0–1	Tie; 10–10 (OT)	Vikings; 21–7	Vikings; 21–14–1	Both teams finished with 8–7–1 records, but the Vikings clinched the NFC Central based on a better head-to-head record, eliminating the Packers from playoff contention.
1979	Tie 1–1	Packers; 19–7 †	Vikings; 27–21 (OT)	Vikings; 22–15–1	
† Denotes a Packers home game played in Milwaukee

1980s (Packers, 14–5)

Season	Season series	at Green Bay Packers	at Minnesota Vikings	Overall series	Notes
1980	Packers 2–0	Packers; 16–3	Packers; 25–13	Vikings; 22–17–1	Packers' first season series sweep against the Vikings since the 1965 season.
1981	Tie 1–1	Vikings; 30–13 †	Packers; 35–23	Vikings; 23–18–1	
1982	Packers 1–0	Packers; 26–7 †	canceled	Vikings; 23–19–1	Vikings open Hubert H. Humphrey Metrodome. Due to the 1982 NFL players strike, the game scheduled in Minnesota was canceled.
1983	Tie 1–1	Vikings; 20–17 (OT)	Packers; 29–21	Vikings; 24–20–1	
1984	Packers 2–0	Packers; 45–17 †	Packers; 38–14	Vikings; 24–22–1	
1985	Packers 2–0	Packers; 20–17 †	Packers; 27–17	Tie; 24–24–1	
1986	Vikings 2–0	Vikings; 32–6	Vikings; 42–7	Vikings; 26–24–1	In Minnesota, the Vikings recorded their largest victory against the Packers with a 35–point differential and score their most points in a game against the Packers.
1987	Packers 2–0	Packers; 16–10 †	Packers; 23–16	Tie; 26–26–1	
1988	Packers 2–0	Packers; 18–6	Packers; 34–14	Packers; 28–26–1	
1989	Tie 1–1	Packers; 20–19 †	Vikings; 26–14	Packers; 29–27–1	Vikings trade for RB Herschel Walker, who makes his debut in Minnesota. Both teams finished with 10–6 records, but the Vikings clinched the NFC Central based on a better division record, eliminating the Packers from playoff contention.
† Denotes a Packers home game played in Milwaukee

1990s (Vikings, 12–8)

Season	Season series	at Green Bay Packers	at Minnesota Vikings	Overall series	Notes
1990	Tie 1–1	Packers; 24–10 †	Vikings; 23–7	Packers; 30–28–1	
1991	Tie 1–1	Vikings; 35–21	Packers; 27–7	Packers; 31–29–1	
1992	Vikings 2–0	Vikings; 23–20 (OT)	Vikings; 27–7	Tie; 31–31–1	Packers trade for QB Brett Favre. Vikings eliminate the Packers from playoff contention with their win in Minnesota.
1993	Vikings 2–0	Vikings; 21–17 †	Vikings; 15–13	Vikings; 33–31–1	In Minnesota, Vikings' K Fuad Reveiz kicked five field goals, including the game-winner. Final season both teams faced off at Milwaukee County Stadium in Milwaukee. Both teams finished with 9–7 records, but the Vikings clinched the better playoff seed based on their head-to-head sweep.
1994	Tie 1–1	Packers; 16–10	Vikings; 13–10 (OT)	Vikings; 34–32–1	
1995	Tie 1–1	Packers; 38–21	Vikings; 27–24	Vikings; 35–33–1	
1996	Tie 1–1	Packers; 38–10	Vikings; 30–21	Vikings; 36–34–1	Packers win Super Bowl XXXI.
1997	Packers 2–0	Packers; 38–32	Packers; 27–11	Tie; 36–36–1	Packers lose Super Bowl XXXII.
1998	Vikings 2–0	Vikings; 37–24	Vikings; 28–14	Vikings; 38–36–1	In Green Bay, the Vikings' win snapped the Packers' 25-game home winning streak in the regular season and 29-game home winning streak total, including playoffs, an NFL record.
1999	Tie 1–1	Packers; 23–20	Vikings; 24–20	Vikings; 39–37–1	
† Denotes a Packers home game played in Milwaukee

2000s (Packers, 12–9)

Season	Season series	at Green Bay Packers	at Minnesota Vikings	Overall series	Notes
2000	Packers 2–0	Packers; 26–20 (OT)	Packers; 33–28	Tie; 39–39–1	In Green Bay, Packers win following Packers' WR Antonio Freeman's rolling catch off his shoulder and run in for a touchdown in overtime, prompting commentator Al Michaels to famously say, "he did WHAT?!"
2001	Tie 1–1	Packers; 24–13	Vikings; 35–13	Tie; 40–40–1	
2002	Tie 1–1	Packers; 26–22	Vikings; 31–21	Tie; 41–41–1	
2003	Tie 1–1	Vikings; 30–25	Packers; 30–27	Tie; 42–42–1	
2004	Packers 2–0	Packers; 34–31	Packers; 34–31	Packers; 44–42–1	
2004 Playoffs	Vikings 1–0	Vikings; 31–17	—N/a	Packers; 44–43–1	NFC Wild Card Round.
2005	Vikings 2–0	Vikings; 20–17	Vikings; 23–20	Vikings; 45–44–1	Packers draft QB Aaron Rodgers. In Minnesota, Vikings overcame a 17–0 second-half deficit.
2006	Packers 2–0	Packers; 9–7	Packers; 23–17	Packers; 46–45–1	
2007	Packers 2–0	Packers; 34–0	Packers; 23–16	Packers; 48–45–1	In Minnesota, Packers' QB Brett Favre breaks Dolphins' QB Dan Marino's record for most career touchdown passes following a 16-yard touchdown pass to Packers' WR Greg Jennings. Last season for Brett Favre as a Packers quarterback.
2008	Tie 1–1	Packers; 24–19	Vikings; 28–27	Packers; 49–46–1	Packers' QB Aaron Rodgers makes his first career start in Green Bay. Vikings' win after Packers' K Mason Crosby missed a potential game-winning 52-yard field goal in the game's final seconds.
2009	Vikings 2–0	Vikings; 38–26	Vikings; 30–23	Packers; 49–48–1	Vikings sign former Packers QB Brett Favre.

2010s (Packers, 13–6–2)

Season	Season series	at Green Bay Packers	at Minnesota Vikings	Overall series	Notes
2010	Packers 2–0	Packers; 28–24	Packers; 31–3	Packers; 51–48–1	Final season for Brett Favre. Packers win Super Bowl XLV.
2011	Packers 2–0	Packers; 45–7	Packers; 33–27	Packers; 53–48–1	In Green Bay, the Packers recorded their largest victory against the Vikings with a 38–point differential.
2012	Tie 1–1	Packers; 23–14	Vikings; 37–34	Packers; 54–49–1	Vikings clinch the final playoff spot and deny the Packers a first-round bye, setting up a playoff rematch at Green Bay the following week.
2012 Playoffs	Packers 1–0	Packers; 24–10	—N/a	Packers; 55–49–1	NFC Wild Card Round.
2013	Packers 1–0–1	Tie; 26–26 (OT)	Packers; 44–31	Packers; 56–49–2	In Green Bay, the tie game marked the first NFL game to end in a tie under the new overtime format, where both teams scored a field goal in overtime.
2014	Packers 2–0	Packers; 42–10	Packers; 24–21	Packers; 58–49–2	
2015	Tie 1–1	Vikings; 20–13	Packers; 30–13	Packers; 59–50–2	Vikings clinched the NFC North with their win in Green Bay.
2016	Tie 1–1	Packers; 38–25	Vikings; 17–14	Packers; 60–51–2	Vikings open U.S. Bank Stadium, with their game against the Packers being their inaugural game at the new stadium. Packers eliminated the Vikings from playoff contention with their win.
2017	Vikings 2–0	Vikings; 16–0	Vikings; 23–10	Packers; 60–53–2	In Minnesota, Vikings' LB Anthony Barr delivered a hit to Packers' QB Aaron Rodgers, which resulted in Rodgers suffering a broken collarbone and missing nine games. Following the incident, Rodgers alleged that Barr gave him "the finger' and told him to "suck it". The hit prompted the introduction of a new rule aimed at penalizing similar hits with a roughing the passer penalty. Vikings sweep Packers for the first time since 2009.
2018	Vikings 1–0–1	Tie; 29–29 (OT)	Vikings; 24–17	Packers; 60–54–3	
2019	Packers 2–0	Packers; 21–16	Packers; 23–10	Packers; 62–54–3	Packers clinched the NFC North with their win in Minnesota.

2020s (Vikings, 9–5)

Season	Season series	at Green Bay Packers	at Minnesota Vikings	Overall series	Notes
2020	Tie 1–1	Vikings; 28–22	Packers; 43–34	Packers; 63–55–3	Game in Minnesota is the highest-scoring game in the rivalry (77 points).
2021	Tie 1–1	Packers; 37–10	Vikings; 34–31	Packers; 64–56–3	Packers eliminated the Vikings from playoff contention with their win in Green Bay.
2022	Tie 1–1	Packers; 41–17	Vikings; 23–7	Packers; 65–57–3	Game in Green Bay was Aaron Rodgers' final win as a Packers' quarterback.
2023	Tie 1–1	Vikings; 24–10	Packers; 33−10	Packers; 66–58–3	
2024	Vikings 2–0	Vikings; 31–29	Vikings; 27–25	Packers; 66–60–3	Vikings clinched a playoff berth following the Packers' Week 15 win against the Seahawks.
2025	Tie 1–1	Packers; 23−6	Vikings; 16–3	Packers; 67–61–3	Packers clinched a playoff berth following the Vikings' Week 17 win against the Lions.
2026	Vikings 2–0	Vikings; 30–10	Vikings; 39–22	Packers; 67–63–3	In Minnesota, Vikings overcame a 22–10 deficit in the 3rd quarter by scoring 29 unanswered points.

Summary of results

Season	Season series	at Green Bay Packers	at Minnesota Vikings	Notes
Regular season	Packers 66–62–3	Packers 35–28–3	Vikings 34–31	
Postseason	Tie 1–1	Tie 1–1	no games	NFC Wild Card: 2004, 2012
Regular and postseason	Packers 67–63–3	Packers 36–29–3	Vikings 34–31	Packers have a 9–6 home record at Milwaukee County Stadium in Milwaukee and currently have a 27–23–3 home record at Lambeau Field in Green Bay.

== Players that played for both teams ==
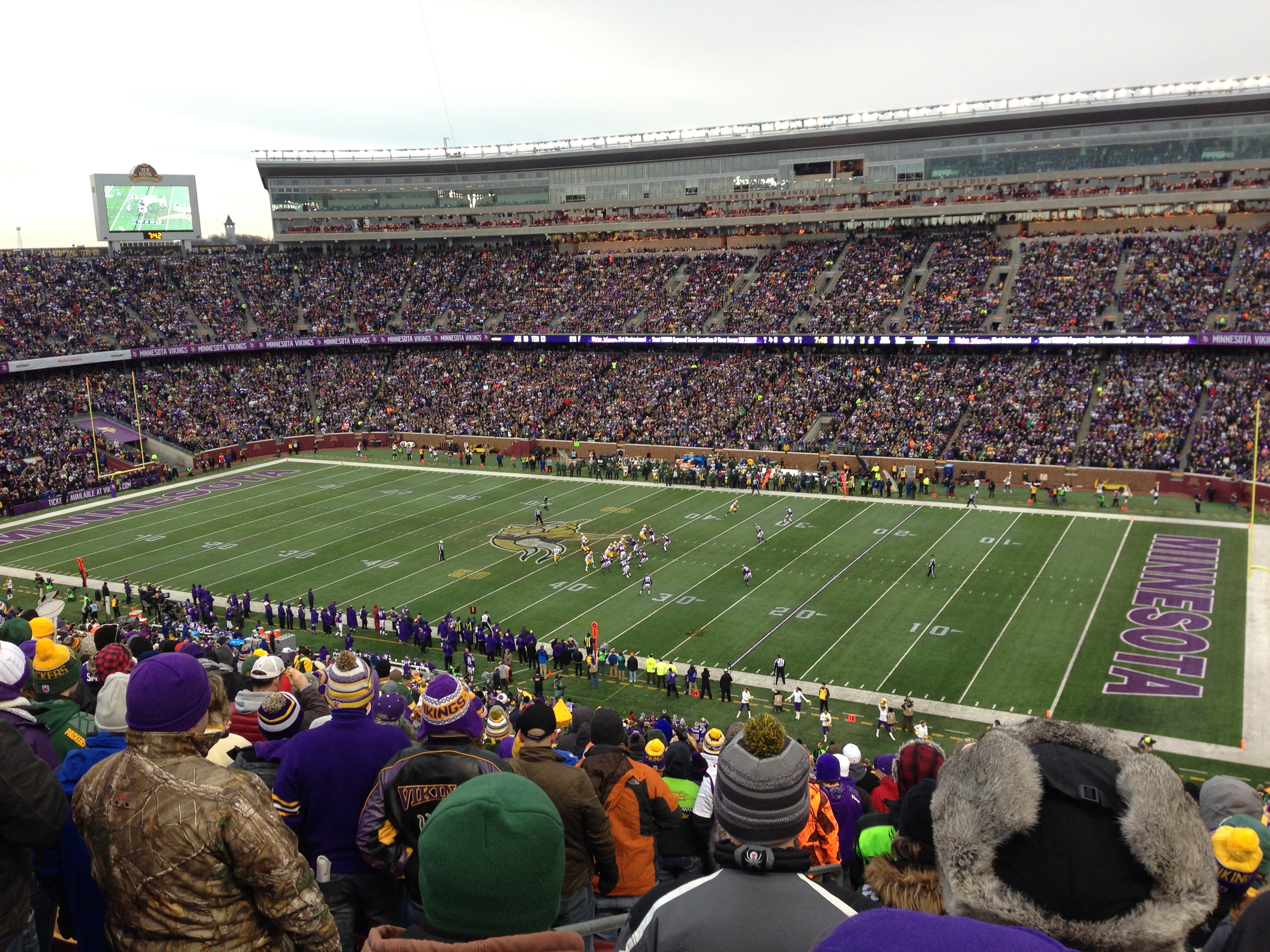
The Packers and Vikings playing in a 2015 game

Name	Position(s)	Years with Packers	Years with Vikings
Carroll Dale	WR	1965–1972	1973
Paul Coffman	TE	1978–1985	1988
Jan Stenerud	K	1980–1983	1984–1985
Bucky Scribner	P	1983–1984	1987–1989
Mossy Cade	DB	1985–1986	1988
Bryce Paup	LB	1990–1994	2000
Brett Favre	QB	1992–2007	2009–2010
Jeff Brady	LB	1992	1995–1997
Gilbert Brown	DT	1993–1999, 2001–2003	1993
Darren Sharper	DB	1997–2004	2005–2008
Ryan Longwell	K	1997–2005	2006–2011
Robert Ferguson	WR	2001–2007	2007–2008
Koren Robinson	WR	2006–2007	2005
Greg Jennings	WR	2006–2012	2013–2014
Desmond Bishop	LB	2007–2013	2013–2014
Letroy Guion	DT	2014–2016	2008–2013
Brandon Bostick	TE	2012–2014	2015
DuJuan Harris	RB	2012–2014	2015
Datone Jones	DE	2013–2017	2017
Javon Hargrave	DT	2026-present	2024
Dean Lowry	DE	2016–2022	2023
Aaron Jones	RB	2017–2023	2024–present
Eric Wilson	LB	2022–2024	2017–2020, 2025–present
Robert Tonyan	TE	2018–2022	2024
Chandon Sullivan	DB	2019–2021	2022
Za'Darius Smith	LB	2019–2021	2022

== See also ==
- List of NFL rivalries
- NFC North
- Minnesota–Wisconsin football rivalry
