= Lit (album) =

Studio album by Lit
- Released: June 22, 2004
- Recorded: 2003–2004
- Studio: World Class Audio, Anaheim, California; The Pool House, Fullerton, California
- Genre: Alternative rock; pop punk; post-grunge
- Length: 47:07
- Label: Nitrus; DRT; Dirty Martini
- Producer: Lit

Lit chronology
Platinum & Gold Collection (2004)	Lit (2004)	The View from the Bottom (2012)

Singles from Lit
- 1. "Looks Like They Were Right" Released: May 4, 2004; 2. "Times Like This" Released: August 24, 2004

Lit is the fourth studio album by the American rock band Lit, released on June 22, 2004. It was recorded at World Class Audio in Anaheim and The Pool House in Fullerton, California. It is the band's final album with all four original members, as drummer Allen Shellenberger died of malignant glioma in 2009.

== Release ==
"Looks Like They Were Right" was released to radio on May 4, 2004. The album itself was released on June 22, 2004, and was the only album issued by the band's label Nitrus Records and DRT Entertainment. (During their three-year break, they left RCA Records.) "Times Like This" was released to radio on August 24, 2004, and again on September 21.

== Reception ==
Professional ratings
Review scores
Source	Rating
AllMusic	4.5/5 stars
IGN	5.5/10
Melodic	3/5 stars
Punknews	1/5 stars
Rolling Stone	(favorable)

It peaked at #113 on the US Billboard 200 and #6 on the Top Independent Albums chart.

== Track listing ==
All tracks are written by Jeremy Popoff and A. Jay Popoff, except where noted.

No.	Title	Writer(s)	Length
1.	"Too Fast for a U-Turn"		3:15
2.	"Looks Like They Were Right"		3:56
3.	"Needle & Thread"	J. Popoff; Kevin Baldes	3:04
4.	"Times Like This"	J. Popoff; A. Popoff; Marti Frederiksen	3:20
5.	"Throwaway"	J. Popoff; A. Popoff; Baldes	3:31
6.	"Forever Begins Right Now"	J. Popoff; A. Popoff; Dennis Hill	3:07
7.	"Moonshine"		3:21
8.	"Alright"	J. Popoff	2:40
9.	"Lullaby"	J. Popoff	4:15
10.	"Hard to Find"	J. Popoff; A. Popoff; Baldes	3:40
11.	"All or Nothing"		4:02
12.	"Pictures of You" (The Cure cover)	The Cure	4:46
13.	"Bulletproof"	J. Popoff; A. Popoff; Frederiksen	4:19
Total length:			47:07

=== B-sides ===
- "Over It"
- "Get Back"
- "No Turning Back" (alternate version of "All or Nothing")

== Personnel ==
Credits are adapted from the album's liner notes.

Lit

- A. Jay Popoff – lead vocals
- Jeremy Popoff – guitar, backing vocals
- Kevin Baldes – bass, backing vocals
- Allen Shellenberger – drums, backing vocals

Additional musicians

- Gregg Coddington – Moog synthesizer on "Looks Like They Were Right"
- Jon Devoto – guitar solo on "Needle & Thread"
- David Campbell – string arrangement on "Times Like This"
- Jake Popoff – vocals on "Lullaby"
- Gabrial McNair – piano and string arrangement on "Lullaby"

Engineering/Mixing

- Kyle Homme

== Charts ==
Chart (2004)	Peak position
US Billboard 200	113
US Independent Albums (Billboard)	6
