= Tripping the Light Fantastic (album) =

Studio album by Lit
- Released: April 1, 1997
- Recorded: 1995–1996
- Genres: Grunge; alternative rock
- Length: 41:14
- Label: Malicious Vinyl
- Producers: Matt Gruber; Lit

Lit chronology
Five Smokin' Tracks from Lit (1996)	Tripping the Light Fantastic (1997)	A Place in the Sun (1999)

Singles from Tripping the Light Fantastic
- 1. "Bitter" Released: 1997; 2. "Dozer" Released: 1997

Tripping the Light Fantastic is the debut studio album by the American rock band Lit. It was released on April 1, 1997, on Malicious Vinyl Records. The band eventually left the record label owning the rights to Tripping The Light Fantastic, and it was reissued on the band's own label, Dirty Martini, with distribution through their then label RCA Records.

== Content and style ==
Tripping the Light Fantastic is a heavy and aggressive album that incorporates elements of heavy metal, punk rock, power pop, folk and grunge.

"No Big Thing" was re-recorded for their second album, A Place in the Sun, which was the band's major label debut.

"Bitter" was released in 1997 as the first single from the album. The second single, "Dozer," was released later in 1997.

Music videos for the songs "My World" and "Bitter" were released. The music video for "My World" was released in 1995, when the band as still known as Stain. The music video for "Bitter," the band's first music video released since the band became known as Lit, was released in 1997.

Some of the songs on Tripping the Light Fantastic were recorded and/or initially released when the band was first known as Stain, before becoming Lit in 1995. "Beginning" and "Amount to Nothing" were first released under the name Stain in 1995 on the mail order Malicious Vinyl Sampler cassette. The 1995 "My World" music video was released when the band was still known as Stain.

"Beginning," "No Big Thing," "Bitter," and "Fireman" were originally released on their 1996 debut EP Five Smokin' Tracks from Lit.

== Critical reception ==
Professional ratings
Review scores
Source	Rating
AllMusic	4/5 stars
The Encyclopedia of Popular Music	3/5 stars

The Los Angeles Times called the album a "skillful but uninspired grunge rehash." The Grand Rapids Press noted that "the sublime melodies that permeate Tripping the Light Fantastic, along with the instrumental surprises that dot its sonic landscape, hint at the band's broader musical influences." The Encyclopedia of Popular Music wrote that it "dynamically fused alternative rock and power pop styles to great effect."

== Track listing ==
All lyrics are written by Jeremy Popoff and A. Jay Popoff, except tracks 4, 6, and 11 (J. Popoff); all music is composed by J. Popoff, except track 2 (J. Popoff, A. Popoff, Kevin Baldes, Allen Shellenberger).

No.	Title	Length
1.	"Beginning"	3:47
2.	"My World"	2:13
3.	"Fuel"	4:17
4.	"No Big Thing"	2:39
5.	"Habib"	4:27
6.	"Explode"	3:03
7.	"Bitter"	3:30
8.	"Amount to Nothing"	2:21
9.	"Dozer"	4:39
10.	"Fireman"	4:08
11.	"Cadillac"	3:22
12.	"I Don't Get It"	2:48
Total length:		41:14

== Personnel ==
Credits are adapted from the album's liner notes.

Lit

- A. Jay Popoff – lead vocals
- Jeremy Popoff – guitar, backing vocals
- Kevin Baldes – bass
- Allen Shellenberger – drums

Artwork

- Art design and layout – Ng Smimizu for Grip Grafix
- Tray card collage – Priscila Bara
- Photography – Jeff Bender
- All concepts – Lit
- A&R – Craig McDonald

Additional musicians

- Derek Dee – cello on "Explode" and "Dozer"
- Niels Bye Nielsen – orchestra on "Dozer"
- Satnam Singh Ramgotra – tabla on "Habib"
- A.J. Martin – DJ on "Cadillac"

Production

- Produced by Lit and Matt Gruber
- Recorded and mixed by Matt Gruber
- Recorded in Los Angeles at Grand Master Hollywood Sound
- Mixed at Scream and Hollywood Sound
- 2nd engineers – Todd Burke, Bryan Davis, Josh Turner and Ralph Cacciutti
- 2nd mix engineers – Ryan Boesch and Doug Trantow
- Mastered by Eddy Schreyer at Oasis
