= These Are the Days (Lit album) =

Studio album by Lit
- Released: December 15, 2017
- Recorded: 2016–2017
- Studios: Sound Stage Studios, Nashville, Tennessee
- Genres: Alternative rock; country rock
- Length: 37:15 (original 2017 release); 46:05 (2018 re-release)
- Label: Dirty Martini
- Producers: Corey Crowder; Lit

Lit chronology
The View from the Bottom (2012)	These Are the Days (2017)	Tastes Like Gold (2022)

Singles from These Are the Days
- 1. "Fast" Released: October 25, 2016; 2. "Good Problem to Have" Released: March 2, 2018

These Are the Days is the sixth studio album by the American rock band Lit. It was released on December 15, 2017. In a musical departure from their previous records, this album showcases the band blending their traditional alternative rock sound with country rock. It is their only album that does not feature an official drummer and is their last album with guitarist Ryan Gillmor as he departed the band following the recording sessions.

== Track listing ==
No.	Title	Writer(s)	Length
1.	"Night in the Life"	Andrew Dorff; Jonathan Singleton; Brad Tursi	3:19
2.	"Good Problem to Have"	Corey Crowder; Cale Dodds; Michael Hobby; Neil Mason	3:08
3.	"All Eyes on Us"	Zach Abend; Crowder; A. Jay Popoff; Jeremy Popoff	2:45
4.	"I Could Be Wrong"	Crowder; Dodds; A. Popoff; J. Popoff	3:23
5.	"Back With You"	Dorff; A. Popoff; J. Popoff; Singleton	3:20
6.	"Someday Maybe"	A. Popoff; J. Popoff; Singleton	3:48
7.	"These Are the Days"	A. Popoff; J. Popoff; Singleton	2:41
8.	"Wish I Was on It"	Ash Bowers; Jim Collins; A. Popoff; J. Popoff	3:16
9.	"Just Feels Right"	Rob Hatch; A. Popoff; J. Popoff; Brandon Ray	3:21
10.	"Headstone"	Ben Burgess; Hobby; A. Popoff; J. Popoff	3:21
11.	"Easy"	Ryan Gillmor; A. Popoff; J. Popoff; Ray	3:15
12.	"California Son"	A. Popoff; J. Popoff; Ray	3:41
13.	"Fast"	A. Popoff; J. Popoff; Jeffrey Steele	4:04
14.	"Welcome to the Party"	Kevin Baldes; Stephen Garvy; Dennis Hill; Kyle Homme; Kenneth Livingston	2:43
Total length:			46:05

- "I Could Be Wrong," "Wish I Was on It," and "Welcome to the Party" are not on the original December 15, 2017 release, but later added to the 2018 re-release. The original release 37:15 in total length. The second release is 46:05.

== Personnel ==
Lit

- A. Jay Popoff – lead vocals
- Jeremy Popoff – guitar, backing vocals
- Kevin Baldes – bass, backing vocals
- Ryan Gillmor – guitar, backing vocals

Additional musicians

- Zach Abend
- Dave Cohen – keyboards
- Corey Crowder
- David Dorn – keyboards
- Dan Dugmore – steel guitar
- Charlie Judge – keyboards
- Evan Kilbourne – drums
- B. James Lowry – acoustic guitar
- Tony Lucido – bass
- Miles McPherson – drums
- Carl Miner – acoustic guitar
- Justin Ostrander – guitar
- Kristen Rogers – backing vocals
- Justin Schipper – steel guitar
- Adam Shoenfeld – guitar
- Jimmie Lee Sloas – bass
- Terry Stirling Jr. – drums
- Derek Wells – guitar
