= My Own Worst Enemy (song) =

Single by Lit

from the album A Place in the Sun
- B-side: "Bitter"; "Money"; "Lovely Day"
- Released: January 1999
- Genre: Pop-punk; power pop; pop rock; alternative rock
- Length: 2:49
- Label: RCA
- Songwriters: Jeremy Popoff; A. Jay Popoff
- Producers: Don Gilmore; Lit

Lit singles chronology
"Bitter" (1997)	"My Own Worst Enemy" (1999)	"Zip-Lock" (1999)

Music video
- "My Own Worst Enemy" on YouTube

"My Own Worst Enemy" is a song by the American rock band Lit. It was serviced to US radio in January 1999 as the lead single from Lit's second album, A Place in the Sun (1999). Lit had first formed over a decade earlier in Southern California, where they alternated between metal and punk early on. Later, the band secured a contract with RCA Records, who funded A Place in the Sun. "My Own Worst Enemy" is considered pop-punk, power pop, pop rock and alternative rock.

Critics appreciated "My Own Worst Enemy" for its simple arrangement and style. Commercially, it reached number one on the US Billboard Modern Rock Tracks chart and was the top-played modern rock song of 1999 in the United States. It has been certified double platinum by the Recording Industry Association of America (RIAA). The song's music video was filmed by Gavin Bowden at Java Lanes bowling alley in Long Beach, California. Today, "My Own Worst Enemy" has been celebrated as a classic pop-punk hit, receiving regular airplay on rock radio and becoming a highly played song at karaoke events.

== Background and recording ==
According to Lit guitarist Jeremy Popoff, "My Own Worst Enemy" "is the result of waking up and realizing you screwed up the night before. The first verse is about screwing up with your chick. A. Jay's the king of having four ex-girlfriends show up to the same show. It's funny watching him try to juggle". Vocalist A. Jay Popoff said that the song "was the combination of many, many incidents ... Sometimes I get in trouble when I get naked in public and have a girl there. It happens when I've been drinking Jägermeister. I actually sang 'My Own Worst Enemy' naked in the studio". The singer said that the song's second verse "is about the morning after, when you hear about all the lame shit you did ... The last time it happened was when we got really drunk in Laughlin, Nevada, for New Year's. I stole a janitor cart, and me and five friends jumped onto the flatbed, rode down the sidewalk, and got chased by the cops. The next day, I found a couple of my friends were taken in by security, who were searching for me all night. I was tucked away in my hotel room, oblivious."

== Composition ==
Considered a pop-punk, power pop, pop rock and alternative rock song, "My Own Worst Enemy" is composed in the key of E major with a tempo of 104 beats per minute. A. Jay Popoff's voice ranges from E_{3} to G#_{4}. "My Own Worst Enemy" has been incorrectly attributed to Blink-182, and its title misquoted as "Please Tell Me Why". The song's guitar riff, consisting of staccatoed octaves played by Jeremy Popoff, is also widely recognized.

== Critical reception ==
James Oldham of NME called "My Own Worst Enemy" "totally loathsome, poisonous stuff, but quite addictive." The song was a late inclusion on NME's "20 Essential Pop Punk Tracks Everyone Should Know" list. It was featured on Fuse's "14 Best Pop-Punk One-Hit Wonders", and the channel called the song "self-deprecating and catchy". "My Own Worst Enemy" appeared on the Phoenix New Times "10 Best Pop-Punk Songs of All Time" list. Daniel J. Katz of The Tech criticized the song's parent album: "Recipe for a one-hit wonder: Start with Eve 6/Harvey Danger style power pop that’s already been done to death. Turn the guitars way up and turn the creativity way down. What you’re left with is a weak collection of songs that are listenable, but bland. This particular collection is from a band called Lit, and it’s called A Place In The Sun (RCA)." Katz continued, "The aforementioned one hit on the album is 'My Own Worst Enemy'". A week earlier, Katz wrote that "My Own Worst Enemy" "is a great song because of its simplicity and short duration". According to Liz Tracy of the New Times Broward-Palm Beach, "'My Own Worst Enemy' was so incredibly radio-friendly that it was hard not to get sucked into that punchy tune and sort of pathetic lyrics". Stereogum's Dan Weiss called it a "charmingly lunkheaded drunk-regrets anthem."

Fuse said, "'My Own Worst Enemy' is self-deprecating and catchy, like all good sad boy band music. The opening line, 'Can we forget about the things I said when I was drunk? / I didn't mean to call you that' might be the most pop-punk verse ever written". Consequence of Sound included Lit on its "100 Best Pop Punk Bands" list, calling "My Own Worst Enemy" the band's essential track. Zack Ruskin of Consequence of Sound called the song "an anthemic earworm". Spectrum Culture placed "My Own Worst Enemy" sixth on its "Top 10 Pop Punk and Power Pop Songs of the Modern Era" list. According to Spectrum Culture, with "My Own Worst Enemy" Lit "demonstrates the adolescent fallouts that can occur from a post-high school life". In CMJ New Music Report's review of A Place in the Sun, "My Own Worst Enemy" was on its recommended-tracks list. Becky Kirsch of PopSugar called the song an "awesome '90s" hit.

"My Own Worst Enemy" became a popular song to choose for karaoke. American Songwriter reports that the song ranks "among the most broadcasted, karaoked, and covered songs in music history." It was considered a seminal alternative rock hit: "The song remains a happy milestone of modern rock's heyday, and to this day, it's played on many rock radio stations," wrote Timothy Malcom of the Times Herald-Record. One Tennessean profile recognizes its cross-generational appeal, observing that it is popular with millennials and generation Z alike. A Consequence ranking of best alternative hits admits it's "a piece of ‘90s nostalgia and a top-notch karaoke jam."

== Commercial performance ==
On February 27, 1999, "My Own Worst Enemy" reached number 17 on the US Billboard Modern Rock Tracks chart. On April 10, the song topped the chart. On May 29, the song peaked at number six on the Billboard Mainstream Rock Tracks chart. The song later achieved mainstream success; on July 3, it peaked at number 51 on the Billboard Hot 100 chart, staying on the listing for 20 weeks. On July 17, "My Own Worst Enemy" peaked at number 31 on the Billboard Mainstream Top 40 chart. On August 21, the song peaked at number 30 on the Billboard Adult Top 40 chart, spending 26 weeks there. The song received the Modern Rock Track of the Year award at the 1999 Billboard Music Awards. The song topped the year-end Modern Rock Tracks chart and appeared at number 18 on the year-end Mainstream Rock Tracks chart. Lit was number four on the year-end Hot Modern Rock Artists chart. In late 2023, for the 35th anniversary of the Alternative Airplay chart, Billboard ranked "My Own Worst Enemy" as the 21st-most-successful song in the chart's history.

== Live performances ==
Lit performed "My Own Worst Enemy" at Woodstock '99.

== Track listings and formats ==
- European CD single and UK 7-inch single
1. "My Own Worst Enemy" – 2:58
2. "Bitter" – 3:30
- UK cassette single
1. "My Own Worst Enemy" (clean version) – 2:58
2. "Bitter" – 3:30
- European maxi-CD and Australian CD single
1. "My Own Worst Enemy" – 2:58
2. "Money" – 2:58
3. "Lovely Day" – 4:06

== Charts ==
=== Weekly charts ===
1999 weekly chart performance for "My Own Worst Enemy"
Chart (1999)	Peak position
Australia (ARIA)	60
Canada Rock/Alternative (RPM)	8
Netherlands (Dutch Top 40)	25
Netherlands (Single Top 100)	56
Scottish Singles Sales (Official Charts)	17
UK Singles (Official Charts)	16
US Billboard Hot 100	51
US Alternative Airplay (Billboard)	1
US Adult Pop Airplay (Billboard)	30
US Mainstream Rock Airplay (Billboard)	6
US Pop Airplay (Billboard)	31

2011 weekly chart performance for "My Own Worst Enemy"
Chart (2011)	Peak position
US Rock Digital Songs (Billboard)	22

=== Year-end charts ===
Year-end chart performance for "My Own Worst Enemy"
Chart (1999)	Position
Canada Rock/Alternative (RPM)	38
Netherlands (Dutch Top 40)	200
US Adult Top 40 (Billboard)	62
US Mainstream Rock Tracks (Billboard)	18
US Modern Rock Tracks (Billboard)	1

== Certifications ==
Certifications for "My Own Worst Enemy"
Region	Certification	Certified units/sales
New Zealand (RMNZ)	Platinum	30,000^{‡}
United Kingdom (BPI)	Gold	400,000^{‡}
United States (RIAA)	2× Platinum	2,000,000^{‡}
^{‡} Sales+streaming figures based on certification alone.

== Release history ==
Release dates and formats for "My Own Worst Enemy"
Region	Date	Format	Label	Ref.
United States	January 1999	Alternative radio	RCA	
United States	February 8, 1999	Active rock radio	RCA	
United States	April 20, 1999	Contemporary hit radio	RCA	
United Kingdom	June 14, 1999	CD	RCA	

== In popular culture ==
"My Own Worst Enemy" is heard in the 2000 film Ready to Rumble and 2012 film American Reunion, although the song does not appear on the original soundtracks of either movie. It was featured on Parks and Recreation, with some of the show's characters playing the song on Rock Band 2. "My Own Worst Enemy" was used in the 2016 action comedy Central Intelligence, and the PEN15 episode "First Day". On a season 4 episode of Superstore, "My Own Worst Enemy" was used for a musical interlude segment, where a floor worker walks past a 'We Can Do It' poster featuring Dina, the assistant manager. The song became popular among fans of the Detroit Red Wings hockey team during games at the Joe Louis Arena. During penalty face-offs, it would play before cutting off at the chorus, to which the fans would sing the rest of the chorus. On a 2018 episode of The Tonight Show, host Jimmy Fallon sings a deep-voiced version with members of The Gentlemen's Chorus.

In 2022, the song became the theme song to the talk radio program The Clay Travis and Buck Sexton Show. In 2023, the song was covered by a fictional band in an episode of The Summer I Turned Pretty.
