= A Place in the Sun (Lit album) =

Studio album by Lit
- Released: February 23, 1999
- Recorded: 1998
- Studios: NRG Studios, North Hollywood, California
- Genres: Pop-punk; power pop
- Length: 45:16
- Labels: RCA; Dirty Martini
- Producers: Don Gilmore; Lit

Lit chronology
Tripping the Light Fantastic (1997)	A Place in the Sun (1999)	Atomic (2001)

Singles from A Place in the Sun
- 1. "My Own Worst Enemy" Released: January 1999; 2. "Zip-Lock" Released: September 28, 1999; 3. "Miserable" Released: January 2000

A Place in the Sun is the second studio album by the American rock band Lit, released on February 23, 1999 through RCA Records and the band's own vanity label Dirty Martini and produced by record producer Don Gilmore.

== Release ==
Produced by Don Gilmore, the album was released on February 23, 1999 by Dirty Martini and RCA Records. It was the band's first release through a major label. The song "No Big Thing," which appeared on their previous album Tripping the Light Fantastic, was re-recorded for this album, and eventually appeared on the auto racing video game Jarrett & Labonte Stock Car Racing. The song "Quicksand" appears on the Clockstoppers soundtrack from 2002. A digital expanded edition of A Place in the Sun containing live versions of "Four" and "Quicksand," an acoustic version of "Down," and the B-side "Money," was released in 2020 in celebration of the album's 21st anniversary.

== Reception and legacy ==
Professional ratings
Review scores
Source	Rating
AllMusic	2/5 stars
College Music Journal	favorable March 29, 1999 (p. 25)
Robert Christgau	C
Melodic	3/5 stars
NME	2/5 stars
Wall of Sound	72/100

The album peaked at #31 on the US Billboard 200 chart and #1 on the Billboard Heatseekers Albums chart. Three singles from the album were released: "My Own Worst Enemy", "Zip-Lock," and "Miserable." A Place in the Sun has been certified gold by in sales by the RIAA in the United States on June 21, 1999, and later certified platinum by the RIAA on October 27, 1999.

The first single from A Place in the Sun, "My Own Worst Enemy," reached #1 on Billboard's Modern Rock Tracks chart for eleven weeks, reached #6 on the Billboard Mainstream Rock chart. "My Own Worst Enemy" was certified double platinum by the RIAA on May 8, 2020, 21 years after the single's release. The album's second single, "Zip-Lock," peaked at #11 on the Billboard Modern Rock Tracks chart and #34 on the Billboard Mainstream Rock chart. "Miserable," the third single from the album, peaked at #3 on the Billboard Modern Rock Tracks chart and #29 on the Billboard Mainstream Rock chart.

A Place in the Sun received mixed reviews. Leslie Matthew in AllMusic described it as "an album that is sonically more focused, but it also unfortunately makes the band sound like replicas of a dozen of their post-grunge contemporaries: neither Better Than Ezra or Less Than Jake". At NME, the songs "My Own Worst Enemy" and "No Big Thing" were described as having "a hook as sharp and persistent as a leech". It went on to say, "Gonzoid trash fun maybe, but how we got from The Dead Kennedys to here remains a mystery." NME listed the album as one of "20 Pop Punk Albums Which Will Make You Nostalgic".

The album was a massive influence on Eve 6's Horrorscope (2000), Good Charlotte's Good Charlotte (2000), American Hi-Fi's American Hi-Fi (2001), The All-American Rejects' Move Along (2005) and Zebrahead's Broadcast to the World (2006).

== Track listing ==
All tracks are written by Jeremy Popoff and A. Jay Popoff, except "No Big Thing" (J. Popoff) and "The Best Is Yet to Come Undone" (J. Popoff, A. Popoff; additional lyrics by Danny Peck).

No.	Title	Length
0.	"Hidden intro track" (instrumental)	1:38
1.	"Four"	3:21
2.	"My Own Worst Enemy"	2:49
3.	"Down"	3:43
4.	"Miserable"	4:16
5.	"No Big Thing"	2:32
6.	"Zip-Lock"	3:32
7.	"Lovely Day"	4:06
8.	"Perfect One"	4:09
9.	"Quicksand"	3:18
10.	"Happy"	2:50
11.	"The Best Is Yet to Come Undone"	4:30
12.	"A Place in the Sun"	4:20
Total length:		45:16

2020 digital expanded edition bonus tracks
No.	Title	Length
13.	"Quicksand" (Live at Woodstock, 1999)	3:30
14.	"Four" (Live at Woodstock, 1999)	3:06
15.	"Down" (Acoustic version)	3:46
16.	"Money"	2:59
Total length:		58:37

- The hidden intro track in the pregap that can be heard by rewinding the CD before track 1 is included as part of track 1 on digital editions.

=== B-sides ===
- "Bitter" – 3:30
- "Money" – 2:59
- "Down” (Acoustic version) – 3:46
- "Snowblind" – 4:06

== Personnel ==
Credits are adapted from the album's liner notes.

Lit

- A. Jay Popoff – lead vocals
- Jeremy Popoff – guitar, Moog synthesizer, backing vocals, co-lead vocals (uncredited) on "Happy"
- Kevin Baldes – bass
- Allen Shellenberger – drums

Production

- Don Gilmore – producer, engineer at NRG Studios
- Lit – producers
- Bruce Flohr, Ron Fair – A&R direction
- Patty McGuire – A&R relations
- Matt Griffin – assistant engineer
- Daniel Mendez – editing, engineer
- Michael "Elvis" Baskette, Cameron Webb – assistant engineers
- George Marino – mastering at Sterling Sound
- Brian Malouf – mixing at Pacifique
- Brian Young – mixing assistant

Additional musicians

- Don Gilmore – handclaps on "Lovely Day," backing vocals
- Michael "Elvis" Baskette – handclaps on "Lovely Day"
- Larry Williams – saxophone on "Happy"
- Reggie Young – trombone on "Happy"
- Gary Grant – trumpet on "Happy"
- Jerry Hey – trombone on "Happy"
- Niels Bye Nielsen – Mellotron on "Perfect One"

Artwork

- Brett Kilroe – art direction
- Kalynn Campbell – illustration
- Jon Gipe – band photography
- Dennis Hallinan – cover photography

Management

- Ruta E. Sepetys – management

== Charts ==
Weekly charts
Chart (1999)	Peak position
Scottish Albums (Official Charts)	97
UK Albums (Official Charts)	52
US Billboard 200	31
US Heatseekers Albums (Billboard)	1

Year-end charts
Chart (1999)	Position
US Billboard 200	106

== Certifications ==
Region	Certification	Certified units/sales
Canada (Music Canada)	Gold	50,000^{^}
United Kingdom (BPI)	Silver	60,000^{^}
United States (RIAA)	Platinum	1,000,000^{^}
^{^} Shipments figures based on certification alone.
