= Lipstick and Bruises =

Single by Lit

from the album Atomic
- Released: October 16, 2001
- Genre: Alternative rock
- Length: 2:59
- Label: RCA
- Songwriters: Jeremy Popoff; A. Jay Popoff
- Producers: Don Gilmore; Lit

Lit singles chronology
| "Over My Head" (2000) | "Lipstick and Bruises" (2001) | "Addicted" (2002) |

"Lipstick and Bruises" is a song by American rock band Lit, released in 2001. The song was featured on their third album Atomic as the lead single. The song was also featured in a 2001 movie Out Cold and the following year on the 2002 movie starring Britney Spears, Crossroads. The song peaked at number 10. on the Billboard's Modern Rock chart making it the most successful single on the album.

== Music video ==
The music video features the band playing at a concert. The music video was directed by Mark Gerard.

== Track listing ==
- US CD single
1. "Lipstick and Bruises" – 2:59

== Chart performance ==
| Chart (2001) | Peak position |
|---|---|
| US Alternative Airplay (Billboard) | 10 |
| US Mainstream Rock (Billboard) | 28 |
