= Miserable (song) =

Single by Lit

from the album A Place in the Sun
- Released: 1999
- Recorded: 1998
- Genre: Pop-punk; post-grunge; alternative rock
- Length: 4:15
- Label: RCA
- Songwriters: Jeremy Popoff; A. Jay Popoff
- Producers: Don Gilmore; Lit

Lit singles chronology
"Zip-Lock" (1999)	"Miserable" (1999)	"Over My Head" (2000)

"Miserable" is a song by the American rock band Lit. It is the third single released in autumn 1999 from Lit's second album, A Place in the Sun. It peaked at number 3 on the Alternative Airplay chart.

== Meaning ==
Lit's vocalist, A. Jay Popoff, said that "'Miserable' is basically about feeling like you need something really bad, and when you have it, it makes you feel like shit. Some people feel it's about a person, but it's not necessarily. It can be about addiction". The first three lines describe three stages of a relationship, from the use of the homophone "come/cum" in "you make me come" to "you make me complete" to "you make me completely miserable".

== Music video ==
Once "Miserable" proved to be a popular single off of Lit's A Place in the Sun album, several ideas were drafted for the video. Lit's original pitch for the video was a compilation of concert footage from both onstage and backstage of their recent tour. This was quickly rejected by the producers, who sent in treatments for other video ideas.

One treatment that was pushed particularly hard was inspired by Attack of the 50 Foot Woman. The video was to feature a gigantic woman dressed in a bikini. The band would perform on her body before being chased down and devoured by her at the end of the video. A. Jay and Jeremy Popoff rejected the idea outright multiple times as it was presented to them, claiming it was "cheesey" and "not (their) style."

While on the set of the Pamela Anderson series V.I.P. to film an episode written around and starring the band, the giant woman treatment was pitched to them again. Once again they were about to reject it when Pamela Anderson walked by. Lit then came up with an ultimatum: they would only do the video if Pamela Anderson played the giant woman.

As soon as she was pitched the video, Pamela Anderson agreed to do it, apparently delighted by the concept, particularly the ending where she would get to eat the band members. Knowing that her usual fee was extremely high, Anderson volunteered to do it for free, asking only that her hair and makeup crew be paid. She also came up with the idea to have the video premiere at the end of the V.I.P. episode before its transition to MTV. The music video was released on February 4, 2000. It was directed by Evan Bernard and produced by Keeley Gould.

The music video depicts the band performing the song on various parts of a giantess (named Val/Vallery in the credits, after Pamela Anderson's VIP character) in a white two-piece bikini and black platform high-heeled shoes, until she playfully chases down and devours the terrified members one by one.

== Charts ==
Chart (2000)	Peak position
US Bubbling Under Hot 100 (Billboard)	17
US Alternative Airplay (Billboard)	3
US Mainstream Rock Airplay (Billboard)	29
