= Zip-Lock (song) =

Single by Lit

from the album A Place in the Sun
- Released: September 28, 1999
- Recorded: 1998
- Genre: Pop-punk
- Length: 3:32
- Label: RCA
- Songwriters: Jeremy Popoff; A. Jay Popoff
- Producers: Don Gilmore; Lit

Lit singles chronology
| "My Own Worst Enemy" (1999) | "Zip-Lock" (1999) | "Miserable" (2000) |

"Zip-Lock" is a song by the American pop punk band Lit, released as the follow-up single to their number one rock hit "My Own Worst Enemy" from their second album, A Place in the Sun in 1999. While not as successful as its previous single, it was able to reach number 11 on the Modern Rock Tracks and number 34 on the Mainstream Rock Tracks.

== Track listing ==
- Europe CD maxi-single
1. "Zip-Lock" (Radio Version) — 3:32
2. "Zip-Lock" (Album Version) — 3:31
3. "Quicksand" — 3:18

== Music video ==
Directed by Chris Applebaum, the video starts out with an homage to the opening of Twisted Sister's "We're Not Gonna Take It". Dee Snider, the lead singer of Twisted Sister, plays the role of the angry father (originally portrayed by Mark Metcalf) who verbally abuses his son for his lack of authority and uncleanliness. After the father leaves, the son throws a pool party for his friends, and as hijinks ensue, they're intercut with shots of the band playing. The video features synchronized swimming and an appearance by a girl in a yellow one piece bathing suit lounging on a red pool float that resembles the album cover of A Place in the Sun. The video ends with the band leaving in a limousine. Mark Hoppus, Travis Barker and Tom Delonge of Blink-182 have a cameo as naked partygoers, continuing the streaking from their video "What's My Age Again?"

== Use in other media ==
This song is used in the opening scene of the movie The Replacements for the opening credits and introducing the fictional main character Shane Falco, played by Keanu Reeves. Setting the scene and implying the potential opportunity for a second chance at a football career.

The song is also featured in the Malcolm in the Middle episode "Francis Escapes".

== Charts ==
| Chart (1999) | Peak position |
|---|---|
| UK Singles (Official Charts) | 60 |
| US Alternative Airplay (Billboard) | 11 |
| US Mainstream Rock (Billboard) | 34 |
