= Handsome Devil (band) =

Handsome Devil is a punk band from Orange County, CA consisting of Danny Walker (vocals, guitar), Billie Stevens (guitar), Keith Morgan (drums), and Darren Roberts (bass).

The group signed to Lit's Dirty Martini label shortly after forming in spring 2000. The band toured extensively in 2000 and the first half of 2001, opening for Hoobastank, Zebrahead, and Sprung Monkey, before recording Love & Kisses From the Underground, issued in September 2001. Two years later, they followed up with the release of Knock Yourself Out. Their third album, Fully Automatic, was released in 2006

== Lineup ==
- Danny Walker - Vocals/guitar
- Billie Stevens - Guitar
- Keith Morgan - Drums
- Darren Roberts - Bass guitar

=== Former members ===
- Brian Wedmore - Bass guitar

== Discography ==
- Love and Kisses from the Underground (2001)
- Knock Yourself Out (2003)
- Fully Automatic (2006)
