= Lit (band) =

American rock band

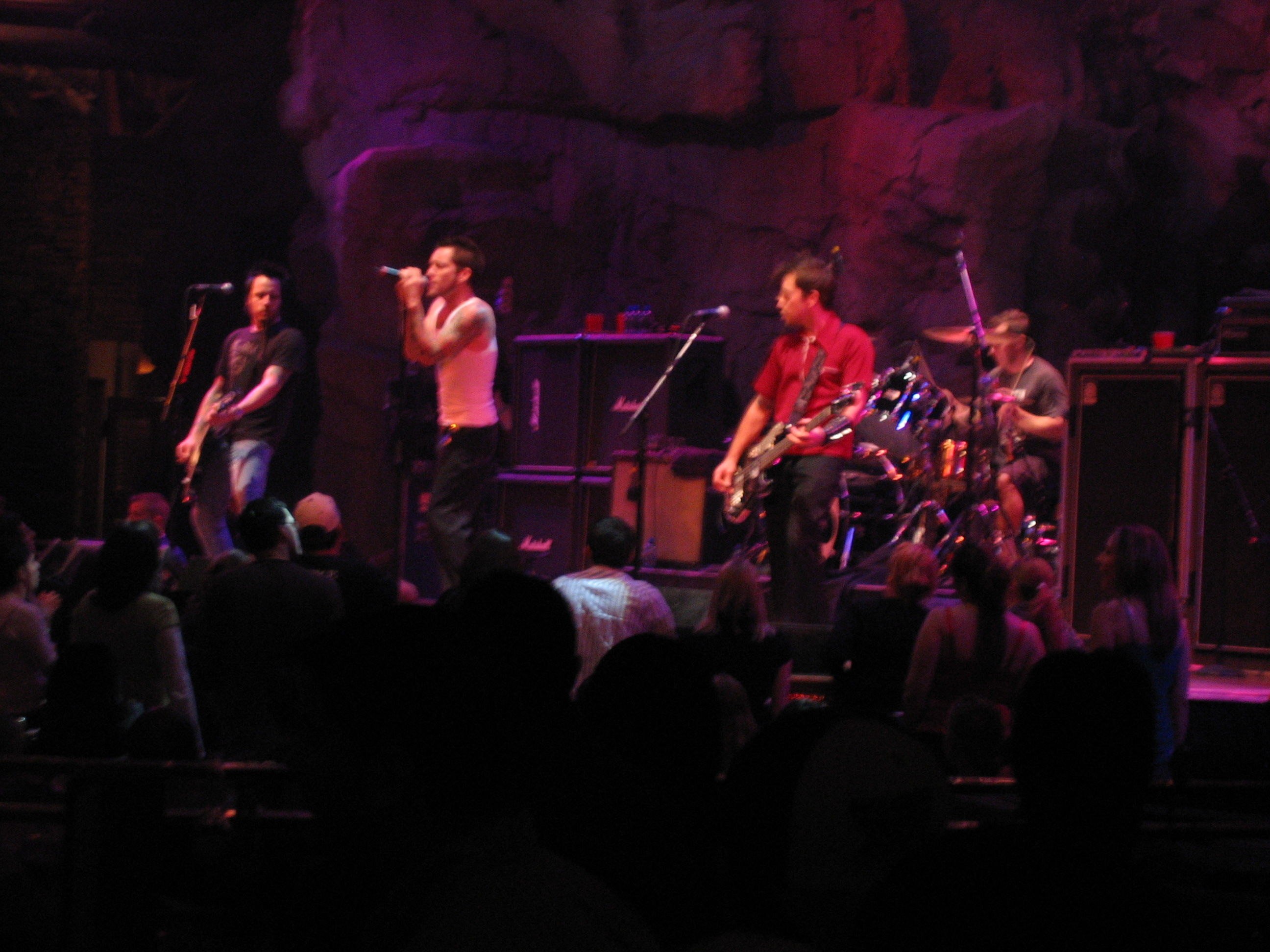
- Lit performing at Mohegan Sun in Connecticut in 2005

Background information
- Also known as: Razzle (1987–1994) Stain (1994–1995)
- Origin: Orange County, California, U.S.
- Genres: Pop-punk; alternative rock; post-grunge
- Years active: 1988–present
- Labels: Dirty Martini; RCA; Nitrus; DRT; Megaforce; Round Hill
- Members: Kevin Baldes; A. Jay Popoff; Jeremy Popoff; Derek Bjornson
- Past members: Allen Shellenberger; Nathan Walker; Ryan Gillmor; Evan Kilbourne; Taylor Carroll
- Website: litband.com
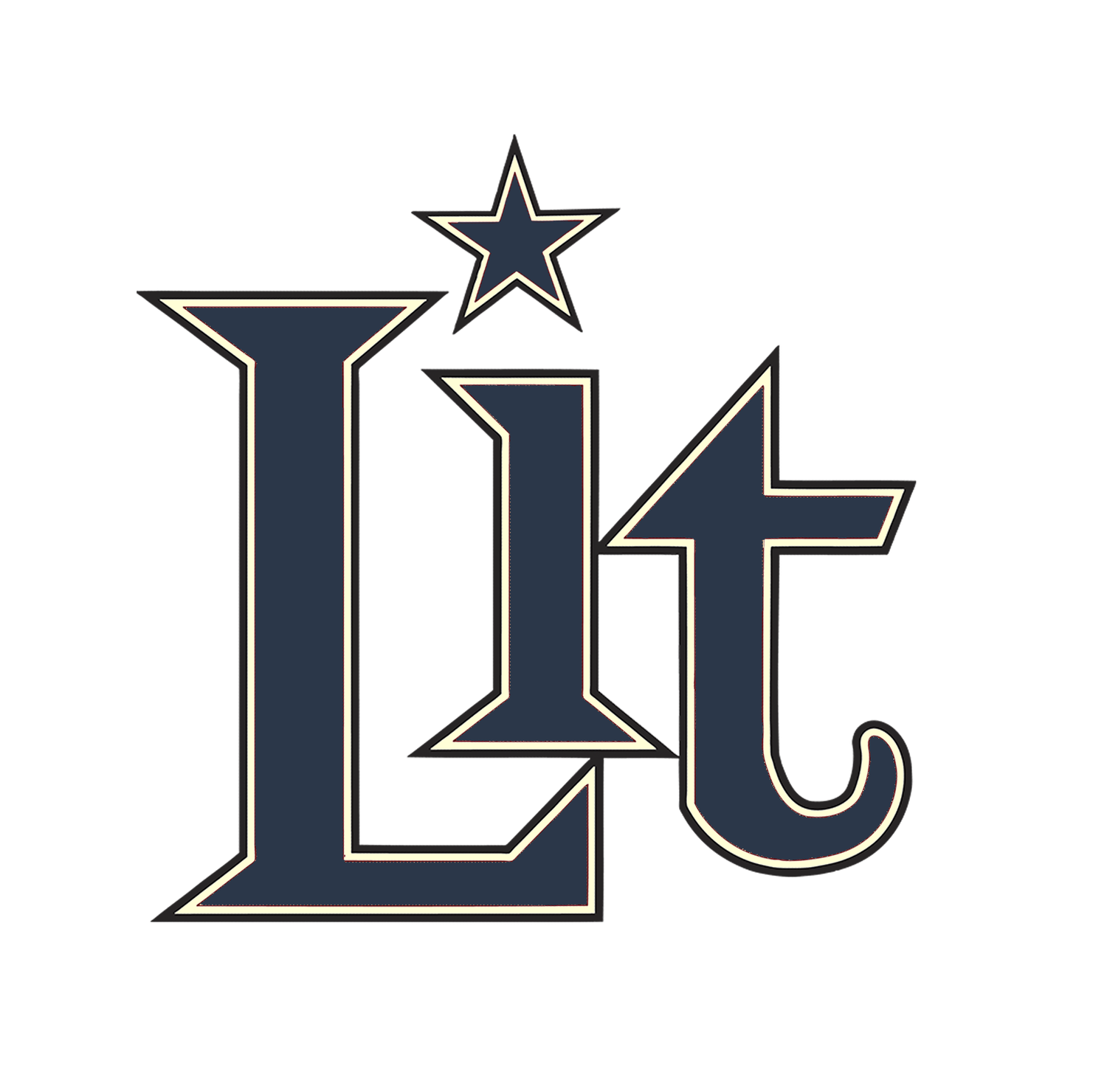

Lit is an American rock band formed in the 1990s in Orange County, California. They have released seven studio albums, and they are best known for their 1999 album A Place in the Sun, which featured the single "My Own Worst Enemy", "Zip-Lock" and "Miserable" were also successful, leading to a platinum certification for A Place in the Sun.

== History ==
=== Pre-Lit (1986–1995) ===
Guitarist Jeremy Popoff and bassist Kevin Baldes met in 1986, and soon after, began playing music together. In 1987, Popoff (guitar), Jerry Neel (bass), Dave Barber (drums) and Derek Johnson (vocals) formed the band Strate Lace and performed three live shows together: The Troubadour in Hollywood, The Waters Club in San Pedro, and a back-to-school party in a friend's backyard. Neel quit the band early on to pursue a career in the mortgage industry and Johnson would go on to attend the Trebas Institute of Recording Arts in Hollywood, California, where he learned to produce and engineer. On February 20, 2003, Derek Johnson was among the 100 killed in the nightclub fire while attending a Great White concert at The Station in West Warwick, Rhode Island.

Meanwhile, around 1987, high school friends Kevin Baldes (15 or 16 at the time), Jeremy Popoff's brother, A. Jay, (14 at the time), and Sean Holland (around 16 at the time) formed the pop metal band Razzle. The original lineup being Kevin Baldes (lead vocals, bass), A. Jay Popoff (drums), and Sean Holland (guitar). They performed their first show on June 26, 1988, at The Troubadour. In 1989, A. Jay switched from drums to lead vocals, and the band added guitarist Jeremy Popoff and drummer Allen Shellenberger. Things began to come together in 1990, when the group released a demo tape (engineered by Derek Johnson, the singer of Strate Lace) and an EP entitled New Vibe Revolution in 1993. Razzle dissolved in 1993 and became Stain in 1994, which had a much harder and heavier sound. They released a demo tape in 1995 and eventually signed with Malicious Vinyl in 1995. After finding out the name Stain was already owned, the band changed their name to Lit.

=== Tripping the Light Fantastic (1996–1997) ===
On April 1, 1997, the group released Tripping the Light Fantastic on the Malicious Vinyl record label. Lit continued to grow their local and national fan base playing locally and touring with alternative bands such as Radish (Ben Kweller), Lifter and Reel Big Fish. Malicious Vinyl (owned by Hip Hop label Delicious Vinyl) lost its national distribution shortly after Tripping the Light Fantastic was released, which allowed the band to get out of their recording contract. They spent the next few months writing songs and showcasing for various major record labels. Lit signed with RCA Records in 1998.

=== The RCA years and mainstream success (1998–2002) ===
Lit gained worldwide popularity with their second album A Place in the Sun, released in February 1999. A Place in the Sun yielded the massive hit single "My Own Worst Enemy", topping the Billboard Hot Modern Rock Tracks chart for a total of 11 weeks and receiving a Billboard Music Award for the biggest modern rock song of 1999. It was followed by "Zip-Lock" (which featured Blink-182 in the video) and "Miserable", which featured Pamela Anderson in the video. Shortly after, the album was certified platinum in the US and gold in Canada, becoming the band's best selling album. The band performed over 286 shows and toured worldwide in support of A Place in the Sun. In addition to the Vans Warped Tour and a slot on Woodstock 1999, the band toured with the Offspring, Garbage, and No Doubt. The band's tracks also appeared in soundtracks of Ready to Rumble and The Replacements, and appeared in the movie Replicate and the TV series V.I.P. starring Pamela Anderson. The band became staples on late night television shows The Tonight Show with Jay Leno, Late Night with Conan O'Brien, Later with Craig Kilborn and appeared regularly on MTV Spring Break and Total Request Live (TRL). Popoff appeared in an episode of MTV Cribs.

Lit followed up A Place in the Sun with the 2001 release of Atomic. The band's highest-charting single was "Lipstick and Bruises" which reached top 10 on the Billboard Hot Modern Rock Tracks. Lit toured to support Atomic, which began with a headlining US tour that scheduled to begin on September 11, 2001, in New Jersey, the same day as the World Trade Center and Pentagon attacks. The band continued to tour, appear on television and movies, and also released two albums from Handsome Devil and The Color Red who the band signed to their Dirty Martini label, distributed by RCA.

In 2001, the band appeared on the unsold pilot for VH1 called Rock Feud, a musical spinoff of the classic game show Family Feud, hosted by former Mad TV cast member Johnny A. Sanchez. Their opponents were Monique Powell from Save Ferris along with her family.

=== Self-titled album and death of Allen Shellenberger (2003–2009) ===
Lit continued to tour the states, including several festivals, before the release of their self-titled Lit on the DRT Entertainment label on June 24, 2004. The single "Looks Like They Were Right" made it on the Top 40 charts. That year the group also put out its first long-form DVD, All Access, on November 16, 2004.

On May 5, 2008, Lit announced that drummer Allen Shellenberger was diagnosed with terminal brain cancer. Shellenberger immediately underwent clinical trials, chemotherapy and radiation at the Cedars-Sinai Maxine Dunitz Neurosurgical Institute. It was discovered that the tumor was malignant glioma and was incurable. His treatments were documented in a piece on ABC World News Tonight that aired in the same month. Lit canceled their scheduled tour dates with Kiss due to Shellenberger's diagnosis. On July 26, 2008, Lit held a benefit concert for him at the House of Blues in Anaheim, California. A number of bands performed including Sugar Ray and Handsome Devil. Shellenberger's last show with the band was September 28, 2008 at Paramount Studios for Paramount Rocks. He died from the cancer on August 13, 2009, at the age of 39.

On November 23, 2009, Lit played their first concert since Shellenberger's death. Drum tech Nathan Walker, who had filled in for Shellenberger earlier that year, was now his successor on drums. They later announced that they had begun to work on a new album.

=== The View from the Bottom (2010–2014) ===
In April 2010 during an interview with OC Talk Radio, Lit hinted that they would return to a major label for their next release. They also revealed their work on a new management deal, as well as performing new material live. In September 2010, Kevin Baldes confirmed that Lit were in the studio, writing and recording their sixth studio album. The band worked with producer Marti Frederiksen (Aerosmith, Def Leppard, Mötley Crüe, Foreigner).

The band reported that they were still in the studio recording in July 2011, and released a demo video titled "You Tonight". Lit announced in December 2011 that they were back in the studio with producer Butch Walker to finish their new album. It was also announced that the band had signed with Megaforce Records and would release their new album The View from the Bottom on June 19, 2012. The first single, "You Tonight", was released on iTunes on May 1, 2012, and a video for "The Broken" was released in August 2012. On January 7, 2013, frontman A. Jay Popoff told Loudwire that after Lit finished touring in support of The View from the Bottom, they would begin writing their next album. A video for "Miss You Gone" was released on June 13, 2013.

On December 9, 2013, the band announced via its Facebook page that it would perform a special 15th anniversary show for A Place in the Sun. The band played the entire album from front to back on February 28, 2014, at the House of Blues in Anaheim, California.

=== These Are the Days (2015–2021) ===
On October 1, 2015, the band announced that they had been working on new music at SoundStage in Nashville, Tennessee.

On October 26, 2016, Lit's music video for their new song "Fast" debuted on CMT, which went to number 1 on the viewer voted 12 Pack Countdown. The band announced a PledgeMusic campaign for their new album on December 6, 2016. They also released another new song "Back with You". These two songs showed a shift in sound for the band to a more country-influenced sound. The band released their sixth album, These Are the Days, on December 15, 2017.

Lit's song "My Own Worst Enemy" went double platinum on May 8, 2020. On June 12, 2020, the band released their first live album Live in NY, 99, which was taken from their performance at Woodstock '99. On July 3, 2020, they released a video for a rare song called "Get Back", which was originally recorded in 2004.

The band released a new single titled "Yeah Yeah Yeah" on October 25, 2021. Nine days later Lit premiered the official music video for the song on YouTube.

=== Tastes Like Gold (2022–present) ===
Lit announced their seventh studio album Tastes Like Gold on April 8, 2022, and released the song "Kicked Off The Plane" that same day. The album was released through Round Hill Records on June 17. Lit joined Bowling for Soup in April for Europe's two week Crowd Surf the UK Tour which was originally to take place in 2021. and the following month the Spring Loaded tour took the band across most of the eastern United States.

The band reunited with Bowling for Soup again in January 2024 for the "Lovin' The Sun Tour" which was made up of cities across Florida.

== Musical style and influences ==
Lit has been described as alternative rock, pop-punk, and post-grunge. The band's influences include Iron Maiden, Judas Priest, Jimi Hendrix, the Cars, Van Halen, Def Leppard, Nirvana, Weezer, Metallica, Elvis Costello, George Lynch, Ozzy Osbourne, and Boston.

On the band's first album Tripping the Light Fantastic, Lit incorporated elements of punk rock, grunge and heavy metal. The band moved away from the style featured on that album and moved to a pop-punk and power pop style on their album A Place in the Sun. They moved to country sound with the band's 2017 album These Are the Days, before returning to rock on Tastes Like Gold (2022).

== Awards and nominations ==
Award	Year	Nominee(s)	Category	Result	Ref.
Billboard Music Video Awards	1999	"My Own Worst Enemy"	Best Modern Rock New Artist Clip	Nominated	

== Band members ==
Current members

- Kevin Baldes – bass, backing vocals (1988–present); co-lead vocals (1988–1989)
- A. Jay Popoff – lead vocals, occasional acoustic guitar (1989–present); occasional percussion (1988–present); drums (1988–1989)
- Jeremy Popoff – guitar, backing vocals (1989–present)
- Derek Bjornson– drums, percussion (2026–present)

Former touring members

- Terry Stirling Jr. – drums, percussion (2016)

Touring substitutes

- Rich Redmond – drums, percussion (2008)
- Stan Frazier – drums (2008)

Touring guests

- Jay Sparring – guitar (2013)

Former members

- Sean Holland – guitar (1987–1992), backing vocals (1987–1992; only with band as Razzle)
- Charles Ward – co-lead vocals (1988–1989; only with band as Razzle)
- Allen Shellenberger – drums, percussion (1989–2009; his death); backing vocals (2004–2009)
- Chadd Anthony (Chad Benekos) – guitar, backing vocals (1992–1995; only with band as Razzle and Stain)
- Nathan Walker – drums, percussion (touring substitute 2008, 2009; 2009–2016) (Note: Nathan Walker was the drum tech of Lit from around 2004 until around 2009, and filled-in for Allen Shellenberger while he was ill in 2008 and in 2009.)
- Ryan Gillmor – guitar, keyboards, backing vocals (2010–2012, 2016–2020; touring 2015–2016; touring guest 2013)
- Evan Kilbourne – drums, percussion (2017–2018; touring 2017)
- Taylor Carroll – drums, percussion (2018–2026)

== Discography ==
Studio albums

- Tripping the Light Fantastic (1997)
- A Place in the Sun (1999)
- Atomic (2001)
- Lit (2004)
- The View from the Bottom (2012)
- These Are the Days (2017)
- Tastes Like Gold (2022)
