= I Can't Hear You World Tour =

2025 concert tour by Pierce the Veil

- World tour by Pierce the Veil
- Location: Europe; North America; Oceania; South America
- Associated albums: A Flair for the Dramatic; Selfish Machines; Collide with the Sky; Misadventures; The Jaws of Life
- Start date: May 13, 2025
- End date: September 12, 2026
- Legs: 6
- No. of shows: 72
- Supporting acts: Beach Weather; Cavetown; Crawlers; Daisy Grenade; Hot Mulligan; Jack Kays; Movements; Sleeping with Sirens

Pierce the Veil concert chronology
- The Jaws of Life Tour (2023–2024); I Can't Hear You World Tour (2025)

The I Can't Hear You World Tour is the twenty-third concert tour by American rock band Pierce the Veil. It began on May 13, 2025, in Charlotte, North Carolina, and concluded on September 12, 2026 in San Diego. The tour supports all of their studio albums, in a similar fashion to Taylor Swift's The Eras Tour and Ed Sheeran's +–=÷× Tour.

Opening acts include Beach Weather, Daisy Grenade, and Sleeping with Sirens in North America, and Cavetown, Crawlers and Hot Mulligan in Europe. Opening acts for Latin American leg of the tour have yet to be announced. It is their fourth tour with Sleeping with Sirens, with the two previously co-headlining the PTV/SWS World Tour in 2014–2015.

== Background ==
On December 2, 2024, Pierce the Veil began to tease an upcoming project on social media. A video was uploaded containing logos representing each of their five studio albums. These logos then appeared at various venues, including Madison Square Garden.

The next day, Pierce the Veil officially announced the tour, which would feature songs from all five of their studio albums, and span the continents of North America, Europe and South America, respectively. The band described it as their "largest, loudest, and most unforgettable tour".

== Set list ==
The tour's official set list was revealed to Apple Music on May 10, three days prior to the start of the tour. The standard set list includes songs from all five of their studio albums: 3 songs each from A Flair for the Dramatic (2007), Misadventures (2016), and The Jaws of Life (2023), and 5 each from Selfish Machines (2010) and Collide with the Sky (2012; 6 including "May These Noises Startle You in Your Sleep Tonight"). The list may vary slightly across shows.

1. "Death of an Executioner"
2. "Bulls in the Bronx"
3. "Pass the Nirvana"
4. "I'm Low on Gas and You Need a Jacket"
5. "I'd Rather Die Than Be Famous"
6. "Where Is My Mind?" (Pixies cover) / "Floral & Fading"
7. "Circles"
8. "Yeah Boy and Doll Face"
9. "She Makes Dirty Words Sound Pretty"
10. "Today I Saw the Whole World"
11. "Kissing in Cars"
12. "Wonderless"
13. "May These Noises Startle You in Your Sleep Tonight"
14. "Hell Above"
15. "Caraphernelia"
16. "Emergency Contact"
17. "Bulletproof Love"
18. "Disasterology"
19. "Hold on Till May"
20. "King for a Day" (with Kellin Quinn of Sleeping with Sirens)

== Tour dates ==
List of 2025 shows
| Date (2025) | City | Country | Venue | Opening acts | Attendance | Revenue |
|---|---|---|---|---|---|---|
| May 13 | Charlotte | United States | PNC Music Pavilion | Sleeping with Sirens; Daisy Grenade | — | — |
| May 15 | Tampa | United States | MidFlorida Credit Union Amphitheatre | Sleeping with Sirens; Daisy Grenade | — | — |
| May 16 | Atlanta | United States | Lakewood Amphitheater | Sleeping with Sirens; Daisy Grenade | — | — |
| May 17 (Note: The May 17, 2025, concert was part of Welcome to Rockville.) | Daytona Beach | United States | Daytona International Speedway | —N/a | — | — |
| May 19 | Philadelphia | United States | Skyline Stage at the Mann | Sleeping with Sirens; Daisy Grenade | — | — |
| May 20 | New York | United States | Madison Square Garden | Sleeping with Sirens; Daisy Grenade | — | — |
| May 24 | Bristow | United States | Jiffy Lube Live | Sleeping with Sirens; Daisy Grenade | — | — |
| May 25 | Burgettstown | United States | The Pavilion at Star Lake | Sleeping with Sirens; Daisy Grenade | — | — |
| May 27 | Laval | Canada | Place Bell | Sleeping with Sirens; Beach Weather | — | — |
| May 28 | Toronto | Canada | Budweiser Stage | Sleeping with Sirens; Beach Weather | — | — |
| May 30 | Mansfield | United States | Xfinity Center | Sleeping with Sirens; Beach Weather | — | — |
| June 1 | Sterling Heights | United States | Michigan Lottery Amphitheatre | Sleeping with Sirens; Beach Weather | — | — |
| June 3 | Cuyahoga Falls | United States | Blossom Music Center | Sleeping with Sirens; Beach Weather | — | — |
| June 4 | Nashville | United States | Nashville Municipal Auditorium | Sleeping with Sirens; Beach Weather | — | — |
| June 6 | Minneapolis | United States | Minneapolis Armory | Sleeping with Sirens; Beach Weather | — | — |
| June 7 | Tinley Park | United States | Credit Union 1 Amphitheatre | Sleeping with Sirens; Beach Weather | — | — |
| June 8 | Maryland Heights (Note: Labeled as St. Louis in promotional material.) | United States | Hollywood Casino Amphitheatre | Sleeping with Sirens; Beach Weather | — | — |
| June 11 | Austin | United States | Moody Center | Sleeping with Sirens; Beach Weather | — | — |
| June 12 | The Woodlands (Note: Labeled as Houston in promotional material.) | United States | Cynthia Woods Mitchell Pavilion | Sleeping with Sirens; Beach Weather | — | — |
| June 13 | Dallas | United States | Dos Equis Pavilion | Sleeping with Sirens; Beach Weather | — | — |
| June 15 | Phoenix | United States | Talking Stick Resort Amphitheatre | Sleeping with Sirens; Beach Weather | — | — |
| June 17 | Albuquerque | United States | Isleta Amphitheater | Sleeping with Sirens; Beach Weather | — | — |
| June 19 | Morrison | United States | Red Rocks Amphitheatre | Sleeping with Sirens; Beach Weather | — | — |
| June 20 | West Valley City (Note: Labeled as Salt Lake City in promotional material.) | United States | Utah First Credit Union Amphitheatre | Sleeping with Sirens; Beach Weather | — | — |
| June 22 | Seattle | United States | WaMu Theater | Sleeping with Sirens; Beach Weather | — | — |
| June 23 | Ridgefield | United States | RV Inn Style Resorts Amphitheater | Sleeping with Sirens; Beach Weather | — | — |
| June 25 | Concord | United States | Toyota Pavilion | Sleeping with Sirens; Beach Weather | — | — |
| June 26 | Inglewood (Note: Labeled as Los Angeles in promotional material.) | United States | Kia Forum | Sleeping with Sirens; Beach Weather | — | — |
| June 27 | Inglewood | United States | Kia Forum | Sleeping with Sirens; Beach Weather | — | — |
| June 29 | Paradise (Note: Labeled as Las Vegas in promotional material.) | United States | PH Live | Sleeping with Sirens; Beach Weather | — | — |
| July 1 | Inglewood | United States | Kia Forum | Sleeping with Sirens; Beach Weather | — | — |
| September 20 | Dublin | Ireland | 3Arena | Cavetown; Hot Mulligan; Crawlers | — | — |
| September 23 | London | England | OVO Arena Wembley | Cavetown; Hot Mulligan; Crawlers | — | — |
| September 25 | Manchester | England | Co-op Live | Cavetown; Hot Mulligan; Crawlers | — | — |
| September 26 | Glasgow | Scotland | OVO Hydro | Cavetown; Hot Mulligan; Crawlers | — | — |
| September 27 | Birmingham | England | Utilita Arena | Cavetown; Hot Mulligan; Crawlers | — | — |
| September 29 | Amsterdam | Netherlands | AFAS Live | Cavetown; Hot Mulligan; Crawlers | — | — |
| October 2 | Düsseldorf | Germany | Mitsubishi Electric Halle | Cavetown; Hot Mulligan; Crawlers | — | — |
| October 3 | Munich | Germany | Zenith | Cavetown; Hot Mulligan; Crawlers | — | — |
| October 4 | Antwerp | Belgium | Lotto Arena | Cavetown; Hot Mulligan; Crawlers | — | — |
| October 11 (Note: This show will be part of Austin City Limits Music Festival.) | Austin | United States | Zilker Park | —N/a | — | — |
| October 14 | Oklahoma City | United States | Zoo Amphitheater | Health; Ecca Vandal; Like Roses | — | — |
| October 15 | Rogers | United States | Walmart Amp | Health; Ecca Vandal; Like Roses | — | — |
| October 17 | Milwaukee | United States | American Family Insurance Amphitheater | Health; Ecca Vandal; Like Roses | — | — |
| October 18 | Noblesville | United States | Ruoff Music Center | Health; Ecca Vandal; Like Roses | — | — |
| October 19 | Cincinnati | United States | Riverbend Music Center | Health; Ecca Vandal; Like Roses | — | — |
| October 21 | Wantagh | United States | Northwell Health at Jones Beach Theater | Health; Ecca Vandal; Like Roses | — | — |
| October 22 | Hartford | United States | Xfinity Theatre | Health; Ecca Vandal; Like Roses | — | — |
| October 24 | Virginia Beach | United States | Veterans United Home Loans Amphitheater | Health; Ecca Vandal; Like Roses | — | — |
| October 25 | Raleigh | United States | Coastal Credit Union Music Park | Health; Ecca Vandal; Like Roses | — | — |
| October 26 | Birmingham | United States | Coca-Cola Amphitheater | Health; Ecca Vandal; Like Roses | — | — |
| October 28 | Simpsonville | United States | CCNB Amphitheatre at Heritage Park | Health; Ecca Vandal; Like Roses | — | — |
| October 29 | Orlando | United States | Addition Financial Arena | Health; Ecca Vandal; Like Roses | — | — |
| October 30 | West Palm Beach | United States | ITHINK Financial Amphitheatre | Health; Ecca Vandal; Like Roses | — | — |
| November 28 | San Pedro Garza García (Note: Labeled as Monterrey in promotional material.) | Mexico | Showcenter Complex | Health | — | — |
| November 30 | Mexico City | Mexico | Pepsi Center WTC | Health | — | — |
| December 2 | Zapopan (Note: Labeled as Guadalajara in promotional material.) | Mexico | Guanamor Studio Theatre | Health | — | — |
| December 5 | Bogotá | Colombia | Royal Theatre Center | Health | — | — |
| December 7 | Lima | Peru | Barranco Convention Center Arena | Health | — | — |
| December 10 | Santiago | Chile | Teatro Caupolicán | Health | — | — |
| December 12 | Buenos Aires | Argentina | Complejo Art Media | Health | — | — |
| December 14 | Curitiba | Brazil | Live Curitiba | Health | — | — |
| December 16 | São Paulo | Brazil | Espaço Unimed | Health | — | — |

List of 2026 shows
| Date (2026) | City | Country | Venue | Opening acts | Attendance | Revenue |
|---|---|---|---|---|---|---|
| April 8 | Brisbane | Australia | Riverstage | Movements; Jack Kays | — | — |
| April 10 | Sydney | Australia | Hordern Pavilion | Movements; Jack Kays | — | — |
| April 11 | Sydney | Australia | Hordern Pavilion | Movements; Jack Kays | — | — |
| April 12 | Melbourne | Australia | Rod Laver Arena | Movements; Jack Kays | — | — |
| April 14 | Adelaide | Australia | The Drive | Movements; Jack Kays | — | — |
| April 16 | Perth | Australia | Red Hill Auditorium | Movements; Jack Kays | — | — |
| April 21 | Honolulu | United States | Neal S. Blaisdell Center | Movements; Jack Kays | — | — |
| April 22 | Honolulu | United States | Neal S. Blaisdell Center | Movements; Jack Kays | — | — |
| September 12 | San Diego | United States | Petco Park | — | — | — |

== Personnel ==
=== Pierce The Veil ===
- Vic Fuentes – lead vocals, rhythm guitar
- Tony Perry – lead guitar
- Jaime Preciado – bass, backing vocals, acoustic guitar on "Today I Saw The Whole World."

==== Touring musician ====
- Loniel Robinson – drums, percussion
