= Pierce the Veil discography =

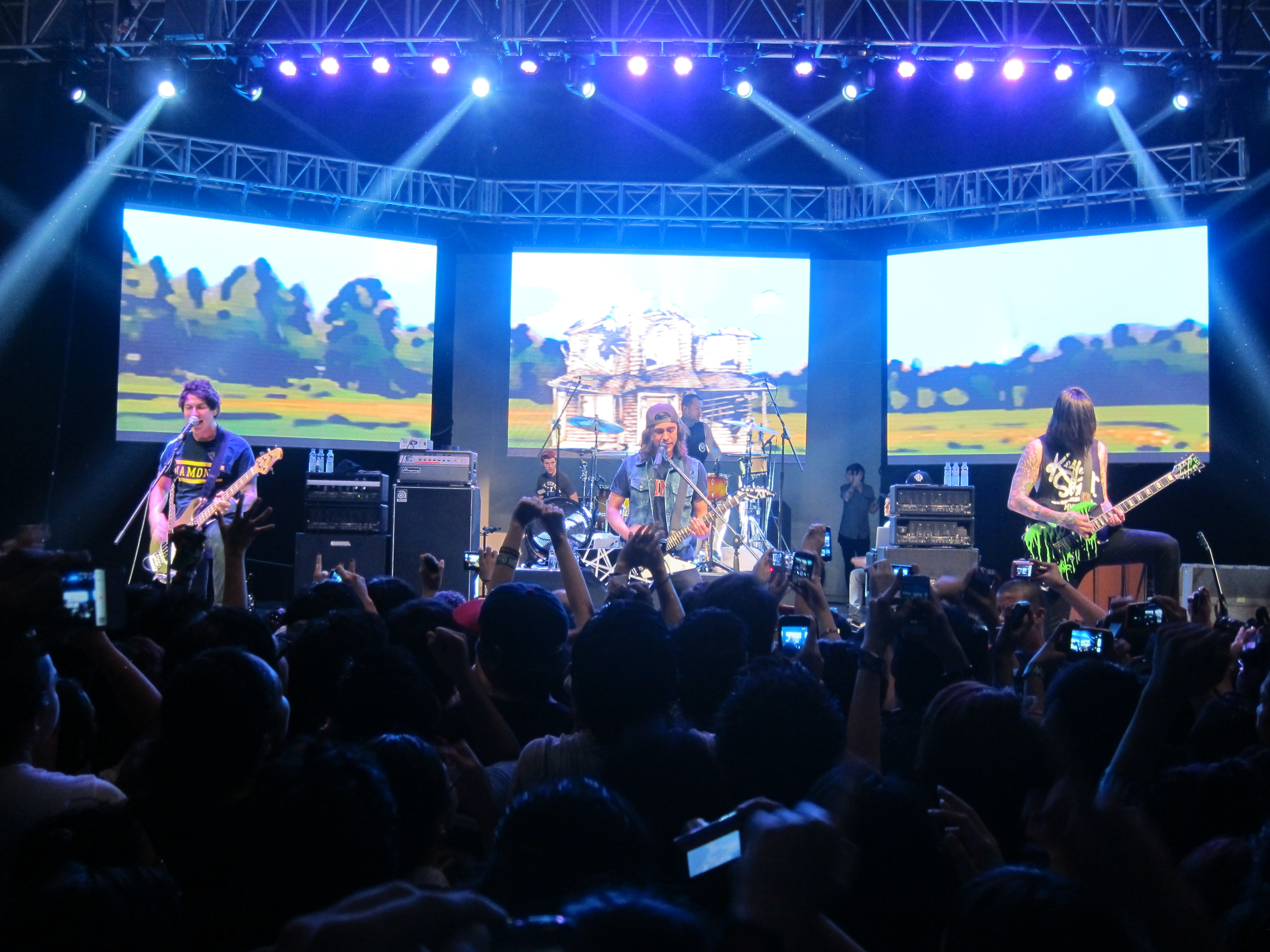
- Studio albums: 5
- Singles: 15
- Video albums: 1
- Music videos: 19

Pierce the Veil is an American rock band from San Diego, California, formed in 2006. They have released five studio albums, fifteen singles, and nineteen music videos.

According to the certifications, Pierce the Veil has sold more than 13 million units, 12 million in the United States alone. Their most successful work is the song "King for a Day" with more than 3.5 million units sold worldwide.

== Studio albums ==
List of studio albums, with selected chart positions, sales and certifications
Title	Album details	Peak chart positions								Sales	Certifications
Title	Album details	US	US Alt.	US Hard Rock	US Indie	US Rock	AUS	GER	UK	Sales	Certifications
A Flair for the Dramatic	Released: June 26, 2007; Label: Equal Vision (EVR132); Format: CD, DL, LP	— (Note: A Flair for the Dramatic did not enter the Billboard 200, but peaked at No. 61 on the Heatseekers Albums)	—	—	—	—	—	—	—		
Selfish Machines	Released: June 21, 2010; Label: Equal Vision (EVR161); Format: CD, DL, LP	106	17	9	16	31	—	—	—	US: 20,000	RIAA: Gold; BPI: Silver
Collide with the Sky	Released: July 17, 2012; Label: Fearless (30166); Format: CD, DL, LP	12	1	1	2	1	81	—	132		RIAA: Gold; BPI: Gold
Misadventures	Released: May 13, 2016; Label: Fearless; Format: CD, LP, DL	4	1	1	1	1	12	98	17	US: 105,000	
The Jaws of Life	Released: February 10, 2023; Label: Fearless; Format: CD, LP, DL	14	2	1	2	3	8	—	43	US: 446,000	
"—" denotes releases that did not chart in that country.

== Video albums ==
List of video albums
Title	Album details	Peak chart positions
Title	Album details	US
This Is a Wasteland	Released: November 11, 2013; Label: Fearless; Format: CD+DVD-V, DL	62

== Singles ==
List of singles
Title	Year	Peak chart positions										Certifications	Album
Title	Year	US	US Alt.	US Main.	US Hard Rock	US Rock	CAN	IRE	UK	UK Rock	WW	Certifications	Album
"Caraphernelia" (featuring Jeremy McKinnon)	2010	—	—	—	—	—	—	—	—	—	—	RIAA: Platinum	Selfish Machines
"Bulletproof Love"	2010	—	—	—	—	—	—	—	—	—	—	RIAA: Platinum	Selfish Machines
"Just the Way You Are"	2011	—	—	—	—	—	—	—	—	—	—		Punk Goes Pop 4
"King for a Day" (featuring Kellin Quinn)	2012	—	—	—	—	37	—	—	—	28	—	RIAA: 3× Platinum; ARIA: Platinum; BPI: Gold; MC: Platinum; RMNZ: Platinum	Collide with the Sky
"Bulls in the Bronx"	2012	—	—	—	—	—	—	—	—	—	—	RIAA: Platinum; ARIA: Gold	Collide with the Sky
"Hell Above"	2012	—	—	—	—	—	—	—	—	—	—	RIAA: Gold	Collide with the Sky
"The Divine Zero"	2012	2015	—	—	—	—	21	—	—	—	—		Misadventures
"Texas Is Forever"	2016	—	—	—	—	33	—	—	—	—	—		Misadventures
"Circles"	2016	—	31	—	—	32	—	—	—	—	—	RIAA: Gold	Misadventures
"Pass the Nirvana"	2022	—	—	39	4	24	—	—	—	—	—	RIAA: Gold	The Jaws of Life
"Emergency Contact"	2022	—	1	—	5	46	—	—	—	—	—		The Jaws of Life
"Even When I'm Not with You"	2023	—	—	—	9	—	—	—	—	—	—		The Jaws of Life
"Karma Police"	2024	—	27	—	16	—	—	—	—	—	—		The Jaws of Life
"Kiss Me Now"	2025	—	—	—	12	—	—	—	—	—	—		The Jaws of Life
"So Far So Fake"	2025	64	1	1	—	8	70	91	46	2	111	RIAA: Gold; ARIA: Gold; RMNZ: Gold	The Jaws of Life
"—" denotes releases that did not chart or were not released in that country.

== Other charted and certified songs ==
List of other charted and certified songs
Title	Year	Peak chart positions		Certifications	Album
Title	Year	US Hard Rock	US Hot Rock	Certifications	Album
"Yeah Boy and Doll Face"	2007	—	—	RIAA: Gold	A Flair for the Dramatic
"Besitos"	2010	—	—	RIAA: Gold	Selfish Machines
"Disasterology"	2010	—	—	RIAA: Gold	Selfish Machines
"I Don't Care If You're Contagious"	2010	—	—	RIAA: Gold	Selfish Machines
"A Match into Water"	2012	—	—	RIAA: Platinum; ARIA: Gold; BPI: Silver	Collide with the Sky
"Hold on Till May" (featuring Lindsey Stamey)	2012	—	—	RIAA: Gold	Collide with the Sky
"Death of an Executioner"	2023	7	43		The Jaws of Life
"Flawless Execution"	2023	16	—		The Jaws of Life
"The Jaws of Life"	2023	15	—		The Jaws of Life
"Damn the Man, Save the Empire"	2023	21	—		The Jaws of Life
"Resilience"	2023	25	—		The Jaws of Life
"—" denotes releases that did not chart or were not released in that country.

== Music videos ==
List of music videos
Title	Year	Director
"Currents Convulsive"	2007	Jeremy E. Jackson
"Yeah Boy and Doll Face"	2008	Nate Weaver
"Chemical Kids and Mechanical Brides"	2009	Nate Weaver
"Caraphernelia"	2010	Robby Starbuck
"Bulletproof Love"	2011	Dan Dobi
"Just the Way You Are"	2011	The Video Mouse
"King for a Day"	2012	Drew Russ
"Hell Above"	2012	
"Bulls in the Bronx"	2013	Drew Russ
"Circles"	2016	Drew Russ
"Dive In"	2016	Dan Fusselman
"Floral & Fading"	2017	Ethan Lader
"Today I Saw the Whole World"	2017	Dan Fusselman
"Pass the Nirvana"	2022	Jaime Valdueza
"Emergency Contact"	2022	Marc Klasfeld
"12 Fractures"	2023	Marc Klasfeld
"Karma Police"	2024	Anthony Tran
"Kiss Me Now"	2025	Yafate Shifraw
"Karma Police" (New Version)	2025	Marc Klasfeld

== Original multi-artist compilation appearances ==
List of original multi-artist compilation appearances
Title	Album details	Contribution
Punk Goes Classic Rock	Released: April 27, 2010; Label: Fearless; Format: CD, DL	"(Don't Fear) The Reaper" (Blue Öyster Cult cover)
Punk Goes Pop 4	Released: November 21, 2011; Label: Fearless; Format: CD, DL	"Just the Way You Are" (Bruno Mars cover)

== See also ==
- List of songs recorded by Pierce the Veil
