= List of Pierce the Veil concert tours =

Pierce the Veil concert tours
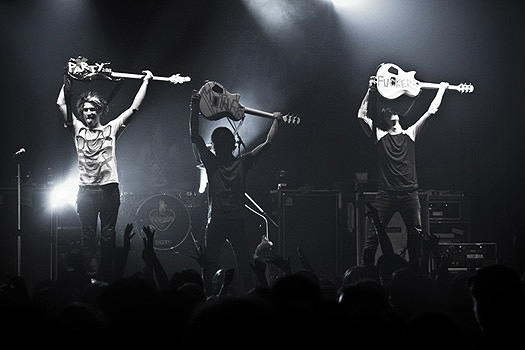
- Pierce the Veil performing during Taste of Chaos 2009
- Headlining tours: 23
- Supporting tours: 16

Since their formation in 2006, American rock band Pierce the Veil has headlined twenty-three concert tours and appeared as a support act on sixteen concert tours. They have toured worldwide, reaching thirty-one countries across five continents.

The band began touring in 2007 as a support act for other rock bands, and embarked on their first headlining tour in 2008.

The band is currently embarking on their twenty-third headlining tour, the I Can't Hear You World Tour, which began on May 13, 2025.

== Headlining ==
| Name | Opening acts | Continent(s) | Associated album(s) | Begin date | End date |
|---|---|---|---|---|---|
| The Delicious Tour | Breathe Carolina; Four Letter Lie; Emarosa | North America | A Flair for the Dramatic | October 17, 2008 | November 29, 2008 |
| 2011 Europe Tour | Blessthefall; Motionless in White | Europe | Selfish Machines | September 28, 2011 | October 20, 2011 |
| No Guts, No Glory Tour (with Miss May I) | The Amity Affliction; Letlive; Woe, Is Me | North America | Selfish Machines | November 8, 2011 | December 16, 2011 |
| 2012 UK Tour | Crown the Empire; The Getaway Plan | Europe | Collide with the Sky | September 16, 2012 | September 28, 2012 |
| Collide with the Sky Tour | Hands Like Houses; Sleeping with Sirens; Tonight Alive | North America | Collide with the Sky | October 12, 2012 | November 22, 2012 |
| 2013 Southeast Asia Tour | Sleeping with Sirens | Asia | Collide with the Sky | February 15, 2013 | February 20, 2013 |
| Street Youth Rising Tour | Issues; Letlive; Memphis May Fire | North America | Collide with the Sky | March 14, 2013 | April 4, 2013 |
| Spring Fever Tour (with All Time Low) | Mayday Parade; You Me at Six | North America | Collide with the Sky | April 11, 2013 | May 12, 2013 |
| 2013 UK Tour | Woe, Is Me | Europe | Collide with the Sky | May 15, 2013 | June 5, 2013 |
| Latin American Tour 2013 | —N/a | North America; South America | Collide with the Sky | July 4, 2013 | July 12, 2013 |
| PTV/SWS World Tour (with Sleeping with Sirens) | Beartooth; Issues; Mallory Knox; Pvris; This Wild Life | Europe; North America | —N/a | November 5, 2014 | April 11, 2015 |
| The Misadventures Tour | I the Mighty; Movements | North America | Misadventures | June 5, 2016 | June 26, 2016 |
| South America/Mexico Tour 2016 | —N/a | North America; South America | Misadventures | July 10, 2016 | July 17, 2016 |
| Australian Tour 2016 | Beartooth; Silverstein; Storm the Sky | Oceania | Misadventures | August 16, 2016 | August 23, 2016 |
| Made to Destroy Tour | I Prevail; Neck Deep | North America | Misadventures | September 3, 2016 | October 16, 2016 |
| U.K./Europe Tour 2016 | Letlive; Creeper | Europe | Misadventures | October 29, 2016 | December 6, 2016 |
| Rest in Space Tour | Crown the Empire; Falling in Reverse | North America | Misadventures | February 17, 2017 | March 10, 2017 |
| We Will Detonate! Tour | Sum 41; Emarosa; Chapel | North America | Misadventures | April 21, 2017 | May 26, 2017 |
| Live in the UK | Against the Current; Carolesdaughter | Europe | The Jaws of Life | December 1, 2022 | December 10, 2022 |
| The Jaws of Life Tour | L.S. Dunes; Destroy Boys; Dayseeker | Europe; North America; South America | The Jaws of Life | March 28, 2023 | April 13, 2024 |
| Creative Control Tour (with The Used) | DeathbyRomy; Don Broco; Girlfriends | North America | The Jaws of Life | May 23, 2023 | July 2, 2023 |
| Australia Tour 2023 (with Beartooth) | Dayseeker | Oceania | The Jaws of Life | July 22, 2023 | July 29, 2023 |
| I Can't Hear You World Tour | Beach Weather; Daisy Grenade | Europe; North America; Oceania; South America | All five studio albums | May 13, 2025 | December 16, 2025 |

== As support act ==
| Name | Headliner(s) | Other opening acts | Continent(s) | Begin date | End date |
|---|---|---|---|---|---|
| I'm a Mathlete, Not an Athlete Tour | Chiodos | Alesana, The Devil Wears Prada, Simcoe Street Mob | North America | November 19, 2007 | December 9, 2007 |
| The Blackout UK Tour 2007 | The Blackout | Flood of Red | Europe | October 4, 2007 | October 17, 2007 |
| Bone Palace Ballet Tour | Chiodos | Emery, Scary Kids Scaring Kids | North America | November 4, 2007 | November 17, 2007 |
| Rather Be Slayin' Noobz | From First to Last | Envy on the Coast, Four Year Strong, Mayday Parade | North America | November 19, 2007 | December 9, 2007 |
| Emery Winter Tour 2008 | Emery | As Cities Burn, Cry of the Afflicted, Mayday Parade | North America | January 29, 2008 | February 1, 2008 |
| Versus Tour | Confide | Bury Tomorrow | Asia | October 8, 2010 | October 11, 2010 |
| This is a Family Tour | Attack Attack! | In Fear and Faith, Of Mice & Men | North America | November 11, 2010 | December 19, 2010 |
| Winterizer | Silverstein | A Bullet for Pretty Boy, The Chariot, Miss May I | North America | January 7, 2011 | January 29, 2011 |
| What Separates Me from You Tour | A Day to Remember | Bring Me the Horizon, We Came as Romans | Europe | January 28, 2011 | February 22, 2011 |
| The Game Changers Tour | A Day to Remember | Bring Me the Horizon, We Came as Romans | North America | March 10, 2011 | April 18, 2011 |
| The Dead Masquerade Tour | Escape the Fate | —N/a | Oceania | April 24, 2011 | May 1, 2011 |
| Right Back at It Again Tour | A Day to Remember | The Ghost Inside | North America | August 11, 2013 | August 21, 2013 |
| House Party Tour | A Day to Remember | All Time Low, The Wonder Years | North America | September 11, 2013 | October 24, 2013 |
| 2013 Europe Tour | Bring Me the Horizon | Sights and Sounds | Europe | October 30, 2013 | December 8, 2013 |
| True Power Tour | I Prevail | Fit for a King, Stand Atlantic, Yours Truly | North America | September 9, 2022 | November 23, 2022 |
| One More Time Tour | Blink-182 | Alexisonfire, Astronoid, Drain, Ekkstacy, Jxdn, Landon Barker, Live Without | North America | June 20, 2024 | August 15, 2024 |
| Long Live The Black Parade | My Chemical Romance | Various | North America | August 13, 2026 | |
