= The Divine Zero =

Single by Pierce the Veil

from the album Misadventures
- Released: June 18, 2015
- Recorded: June 2015
- Genre: Post-hardcore
- Length: 4:12
- Label: Fearless
- Songwriters: Vic Fuentes; Brad Hargreaves; Curtis Peoples
- Producer: Dan Korneff

Pierce the Veil singles chronology
"Hell Above" (2012)	"The Divine Zero" (2015)	"Texas Is Forever" (2016)

"The Divine Zero" is a song by American rock band Pierce the Veil. It was released as the lead single off of their fourth studio album, Misadventures, on June 18, 2015, via digital download. The song was written by vocalist Vic Fuentes and produced by Dan Korneff. "The Divine Zero" was nominated for Song of the Year at the 2016 Alternative Press Music Awards.

== Background ==
Following Pierce the Veil's extensive touring in support of their third studio album, Collide with the Sky (2012), the band wrote and recorded material for a fourth studio album throughout the later half of 2014 with producer Dan Korneff. The lead single, "The Divine Zero", was released without previous announcements on Thursday, June 18, 2015 to iTunes Store and other digital download outlets. The song was performed throughout the band's set on the 2015 Vans Warped Tour.

== Track listing ==
Digital download

1. The Divine Zero" – 4:12

== Personnel ==
Pierce the Veil

- Vic Fuentes – vocals, rhythm guitar
- Tony Perry – lead guitar
- Jaime Preciado – bass
- Mike Fuentes – drums, percussion

Production

- Dan Korneff – production

== Charts ==
Chart performance
Chart (2015)	Peak position
Australia Hitseekers (ARIA)	12
UK Indie (Official Charts)	37
US Hot Rock & Alternative Songs (Billboard)	21

== Release history ==
Release dates and formats
Region	Date	Format	Label	Ref.
United States	June 18, 2015	Digital download	Fearless	
