= This Is a Wasteland =

- Produced by: MotionArmy
- Starring: Pierce the Veil
- Production company: Fearless
- Release date: November 11, 2013
- Running time: 60 minutes

This Is a Wasteland is a documentary film following Pierce the Veil's first world tour. It was directed by Dan Fusselman and produced by MotionArmy. The camera was led by Dan Fusselman himself (United States, United Kingdom and South America) and Josiah van Dien (Australia and Southeast Asia). The photos for the inlay were shot by photographer Adam Elmakias. The DVD is only available in the English language.

== Plot ==
The documentary follows Pierce the Veil during their first world tour, in support of their third album, Collide with the Sky (2012). It begins with their shows in Southeast Asia, followed by their first ever appearance at the Soundwave Festivals in Australia, the U.S. tour with All Time Low, a club tour in the United Kingdom, their first appearance at Rock am Ring and Rock im Park and ends with their first concert tour in South America.

The film shows snippets from their shows at international music festivals such as the Soundwave Festival, Rock am Ring, Rock im Park, Slam Dunk Festival, as of shows in Southeast Asia, the United States, Brazil, Chile, Mexico, Argentina and the United Kingdom. The documentary also shows their appearance at the 2013 Kerrang! Awards in London. The film also gives an insight of the band's hectic life during the tour.

The DVD also features the music videos for "Bulls in the Bronx", "Hell Above" and "King for a Day", the latter of which received a Kerrang! Award for the best music video in 2013.

== Release ==
The documentary is a direct-to-DVD release which was released in the U.S. on November 11, 2013 as a bonus disc for the reissue of their third album Collide with the Sky, selling 30,000 in its first week resulting in a re-entry of the album at 62 on the US Billboard 200 charts. The DVD was released worldwide on November 25, 2013. It won a Revolver Golden Gods Award for Best Video/DVD in 2014.
