= King for a Day (Pierce the Veil song) =

2012 single by Pierce the Veil

- Cover of the 2019 re-release specially for the 25th anniversary of Fearless Records

Single by Pierce the Veil featuring Kellin Quinn

from the album Collide with the Sky
- B-side: "Hold on Till May" (acoustic version)
- Released: June 5, 2012
- Recorded: 2012
- Genre: Emo; post-hardcore
- Length: 3:56 (album version); 4:53 (music video)
- Label: Fearless
- Songwriters: Mike Fuentes; Vic Fuentes; Steven S Miller; Curtis Peoples; Tony Perry; Jaime Preciado; Kellin Quinn
- Producers: Dan Korneff; Kato Khandwala

Pierce the Veil singles chronology
"Bulletproof Love" (2010)	"King for a Day" (2012)	"Bulls in the Bronx" (2012)

Music video
- "King for a Day" on YouTube

"King for a Day" is a song by American rock band Pierce the Veil, released on June 5, 2012, by Fearless Records. It features guest vocals by Kellin Quinn of Sleeping with Sirens. It was the first single released from their third album Collide with the Sky (2012).

On August 6, 2012, an official music video was released. The song charted on Hot Rock Songs and the Digital Rock Songs charts, both published by Billboard. "King for a Day" was nominated for both Best Single and Best Video at the 2013 Kerrang! Awards.

== Background and recording ==
The title of the song came from drummer Mike Fuentes. In an interview with Revolver, lead vocalist Vic Fuentes said he was impressed by the title. Together with Curtis Peoples and Steve Miller, the band started to write the song lyrics in a small cabin in Big Bear Lake, California which became later a small recording studio.

Because of the fans, the band contacted Kellin Quinn of Sleeping with Sirens asking if he was interested in being featured on the song. They never met before but Fuentes decided to write to him on Twitter. Quinn decided to collaborate with Pierce the Veil. His vocal parts were recorded in a second studio. While producing the song, Pierce the Veil and Kellin Quinn wrote together via email.

== Meaning ==
This song is about getting pushed past the breaking point. In an interview, Fuentes stated he sometimes has too many things around his mind at once so he isn't able to control his mind or his body at times.

== Music video ==
An official music video was directed by Drew Russ who would get involved later in their music video for "Bulls in the Bronx". On June 25, 2012, Alternative Press announced Pierce the Veil started working on a new music video. On August 2, 2012, the band published an official trailer for the music video. Four days later, the video officially was premiered on Vevo.

The video portrays Vic Fuentes and Kellin Quinn as bankers. The bank manager Mr. Smalls asks both to stay in the bank overnight to correct the sales values for an IRS audit. In doing this, they discover that Mr. Smalls transferred more than $2,500,000 to Haven Bank of Switerland [sic], which was most likely the reason for the forced pay cut the employees had taken a week before.

At the beginning of the second verse, Quinn and Fuentes meet with other people (played by the other band members of Pierce the Veil) who plan to rob the bank. In the chorus, Fuentes and Quinn enter the building in black suits. In the bridge, the gang arrive and get into the bank. Mr. Smalls is caught by a robber while all the bankers hide. The robbers get into the safe-deposit and start collecting the money in bags, which they later give to the employees. While he is tied up, Mr. Smalls pees all over himself. When they're ready to flee, one of the robbers shoots Mr. Smalls with a water gun, at which point he realizes they have cheated him.

At the end of the video, the robbers celebrate their victory while Mr. Smalls is arrested due to tax evasion and embezzlement and sentenced to 25 years in prison, which was released on the news station the robbers watch during their celebration.

A behind-the-scenes-video was published on October 3, 2012, on YouTube.

=== Equipment ===
- Vic Fuentes' 'Slimer' Taylor SB1-X
- Tony Perry's ESP Viper Slimer
- Jaime Preciado's cream Music Man StingRay
- Mike Fuentes' Truth Customs drumkit.

== Reception ==
=== Commercial ===
"King for a Day" was released as the first single of Collide with the Sky on June 5, 2012. On the same day, a lyric-video was published on YouTube which got nearly 30 million views. On August 6, 2012, the official music video was released and has garnered 168 million views as of December 4, 2023.

The single charted on the U.S. Billboard Digital Rock Songs where it peaked at number 29, and on the Hot Rock Songs chart with a peak of number 37. The song also peaked at number 28 in the UK Rock & Metal Singles Charts. In November 2014, the song was certified Gold by the RIAA for having sold more than 500,000 units in the U.S. On June 28, 2024, it was announced the single went 2× Platinum, selling more than two million units digitally.

On May 12, 2015, it was revealed that "King for a Day" will be one of the playable songs in the video game Guitar Hero Live. It was also announced that "King for a Day" will be available for downloadable content for Rock Band 4 when pre-ordered digitally on Xbox One.

On August 17, 2022, "King for a Day" reached number one on the U.S. Billboard Hard Rock Streaming Songs chart, number seven on the Rock Streaming Songs chart, number six on Alternative Streaming Songs chart, and number 21 on Alternative Digital Song Sales chart thanks to a surge in usage of the song on TikTok.

=== Awards ===
- Alternative Press Readers poll
  - 2012: Best Single (won)
- Kerrang! Awards
  - 2013: Best Video (won)
  - 2013: Best Single (nominated)

== Charts ==
Chart performance for "King for a Day"
Chart (2012)	Peak position
UK Rock & Metal (Official Charts)	28
US Hot Rock & Alternative Songs (Billboard)	37

== Certifications ==
Certifications for "King for a Day"
Region	Certification	Certified units/sales
Australia (ARIA)	Platinum	70,000^{‡}
Brazil (Pro-Música Brasil)	Gold	30,000^{‡}
Canada (Music Canada)	Platinum	80,000^{‡}
New Zealand (RMNZ)	Platinum	30,000^{‡}
United Kingdom (BPI)	Gold	400,000^{‡}
United States (RIAA)	3× Platinum	3,000,000^{‡}
^{‡} Sales+streaming figures based on certification alone.
