= ESP Viper =

- Manufacturer: ESP Guitars
- Period: Unknown

Construction
- Body type: Solid
- Neck joint: Neck-thru, set-in neck

Woods
- Body: Mahogany
- Neck: 3-piece maple
- Fretboard: Ebony

Hardware
- Bridge: Gotoh Tune-o-matic bridge, Tonepros locking bridge
- Pickup(s): EMG 81, EMG 707 (Bridge)/EMG 85, EMG 707 (Neck)

Colors available
- Black Satin, Camo, See-thru Black Cherry (LTD only), See-thru Black (LTD only), Olympic White (LTD only), Silver Sunburst (LTD only), Vintage Sunburst (LTD only), Pinkberry Fade (LTD only)

The ESP Viper is an electric guitar manufactured by ESP Guitars. The ESP Viper has a shape similar to that of a Gibson SG, with slight variations; Vipers have a slight diagonal slope at the bottom and an asymmetrical front profile. The body is mahogany or alder. The neck is three pieces, with a rosewood fingerboard. As standard, it comes fitted with an EMG 81/85 pickup set. It has a scale length of 24.75".

The LTD Vipers that are made by ESP's sister line are lower cost and of different quality to the ESP Viper. LTD Vipers are made of less expensive materials and do not possess the same specifications as ESP Vipers (with the exception of the higher-end LTDs, having EMG 81/85 pickups like the ESP Viper). Unlike the ESP Viper line, the LTD line features a Viper with Seymour Duncan passive pickups.

== Standard features ==
The ESP Viper has a set-through neck, 24.75" scale, a mahogany body and neck, ebony fingerboard, 42mm bone nut, thin U-neck contour, 24 XJ frets, black nickel Hardware, Gotoh Magnum Lock tuners, Gotoh TOM bridge and tailpiece, EMG 81 (B) / 85 (N) active p.u., and BLKS finish.

The Viper-7 has set-neck construction, 25.5" scale, 45mm bone nut, EMG 707 (B & N) Active p.u.

== Artists or bands who have used ESP Vipers ==
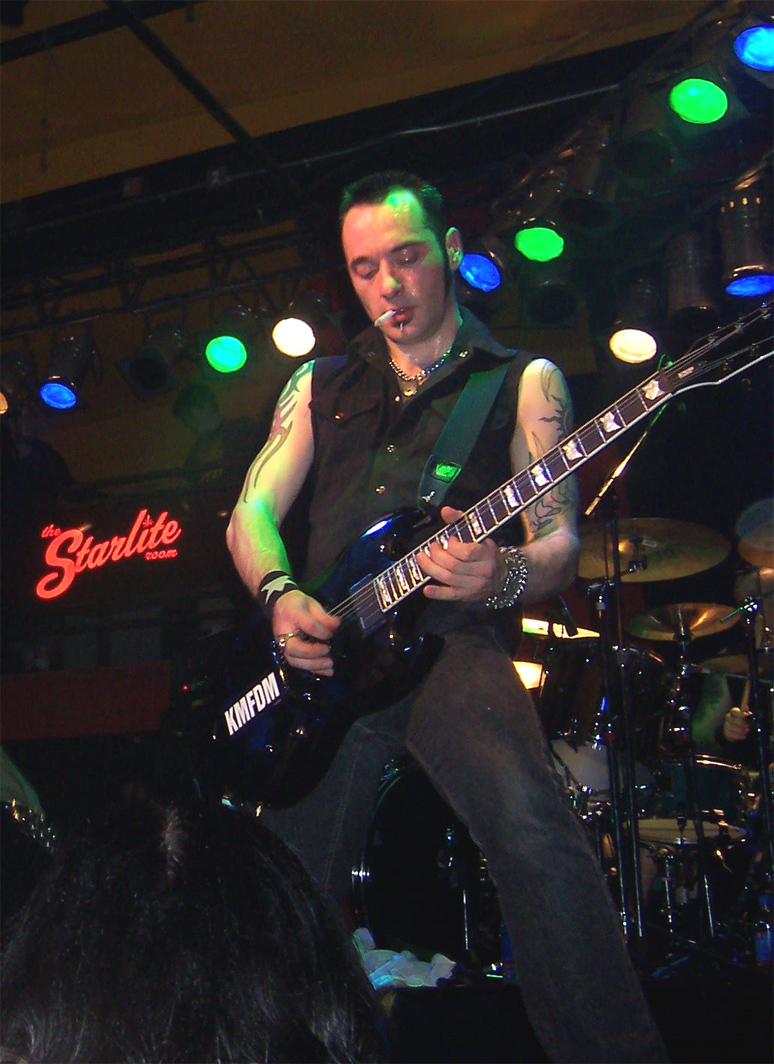
KMFDM guitarist Jules Hodgson and his ESP Viper

- Bruce Kulick of Billy Squier, Blackjack, Kiss, Union, Eric Singer Project, Daniel MCCartney, Grand Funk Railroad, Meat Loaf, and MEIK (Note: Bruce has his own signature ESP Viper)
- James Hetfield of Metallica
- Pepper Keenan of Down and Corrosion of Conformity
- Kirk Windstein of Down and Crowbar
- Woody Weatherman of Corrosion of Conformity
- Jules Hodgson of KMFDM
- Captain Sensible of The Damned
- Tony Perry of Pierce The Veil
- Jun Senoue of Crush 40
- Max Cavalera of Soulfly and Cavalera Conspiracy; formerly of Sepultura
- Fallon Bowman of Amphibious Assault and Kittie
- Sonny Moore of From First to Last
- Thomas Erak of The Fall of Troy
- Damon Johnson of Alice Cooper
- Travis Miguel of Atreyu
- Chino Moreno of the Deftones
- Ahrue Luster of Ill Niño and formerly Machine Head
- Zoltán Farkas of Ektomorf
- Franko Beaulieu of Neon Rise
- Kaoru of Dir En Grey (Note: Actually uses ESP DKV, his new custom guitar series)
- Matt DeVries of Chimaira
- Rob Arnold of Chimaira
- Myk Russell of LoveHateHero
- Timoteo Rosales III of I Am Ghost
- Tim Millar of Protest the Hero
- Nikolay Kiselev of Bratsk-city
- Manabu of Screw
- Members of Whitechapel
- Vorph of Samael
- Louise Post of Veruca Salt
- Phil X of The Drills and Powder¨
- Lindsay Mcdougall of Frenzal Rhomb
- Joshua Moore of We Came As Romans
- Sebastian Oliver Lange of In Extremo
- Ryan Reed of Rite To Remain
- Reba Meyers of Code Orange
- Tony Reed of Mos Generator
- Lars Frederiksen of Rancid
