= Tony Perry =

American guitarist

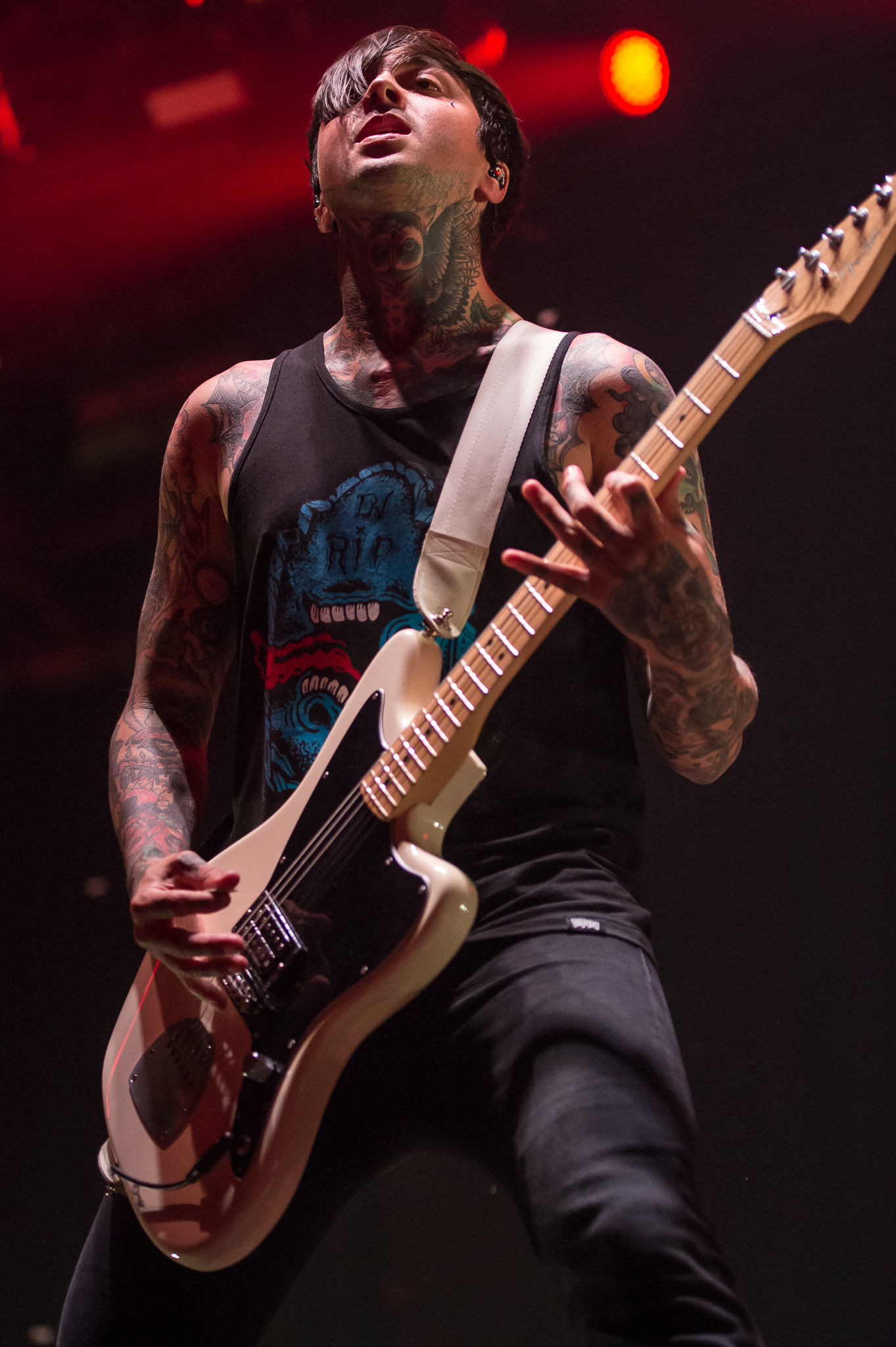
- Perry performing in 2017

Background information
- Born: 25 February 1986 (age 40); Tijuana, Baja California, Mexico
- Origin: San Diego, California, U.S.
- Genres: Post-hardcore; pop-punk; experimental rock; emo; metalcore; hardcore punk
- Occupation: Musician
- Instrument: Guitar
- Years active: 2006–present
- Member of: Pierce the Veil
- Formerly of: Trigger My Nightmare
- Website: piercetheveil.net

Tony Perry is an American musician, best known as the lead guitarist of the rock band Pierce the Veil. He is also a co-owner of Living The Dream Foundation alongside bandmates Vic Fuentes and Jaime Preciado.

== Early life ==
Perry was born in Tijuana, Baja California. For a brief period, Perry was the lead guitarist of now-disbanded metalcore band Trigger My Nightmare. Perry worked at a Guitar Center in San Diego, where he met Pierce The Veil frontman, Vic Fuentes. He joined Pierce The Veil shortly after on lead guitar, alongside former bandmate Jaime Preciado on bass. He met his wife, Erin, in 2013; the couple married in 2021.

== Career ==
Perry joined Pierce the Veil in 2007 for the release of the band's first full-length album A Flair for the Dramatic. In the following years, he released four albums with the band, Selfish Machines, Collide with the Sky, Misadventures, and The Jaws of Life.

He has toured in North America, South America, Australia, Asia and Europe several times. Perry has performed at multiple major music festivals such as Rock am Ring and Rock im Park, Reading and Leeds, Warped Tour, Soundwave Festival and Slam Dunk Festival. Pierce the Veil has shared the stage with acts such as Bring Me the Horizon, Black Veil Brides, All Time Low, Sleeping with Sirens, Tonight Alive, A Day to Remember and Blink-182

Perry has cited Jimi Hendrix, Jimmy Page, and Slash as his main influences. Perry's style takes on a mix of 2000s pop punk, metalcore and hardcore, along with Eddie Van Halen-esque styles seen in songs such as The Boy Who Could Fly. Perry's style also distinctly interworks flamenco guitar from his native Mexico, giving Pierce The Veil its signature "Mexicore" sound.

== Equipment ==
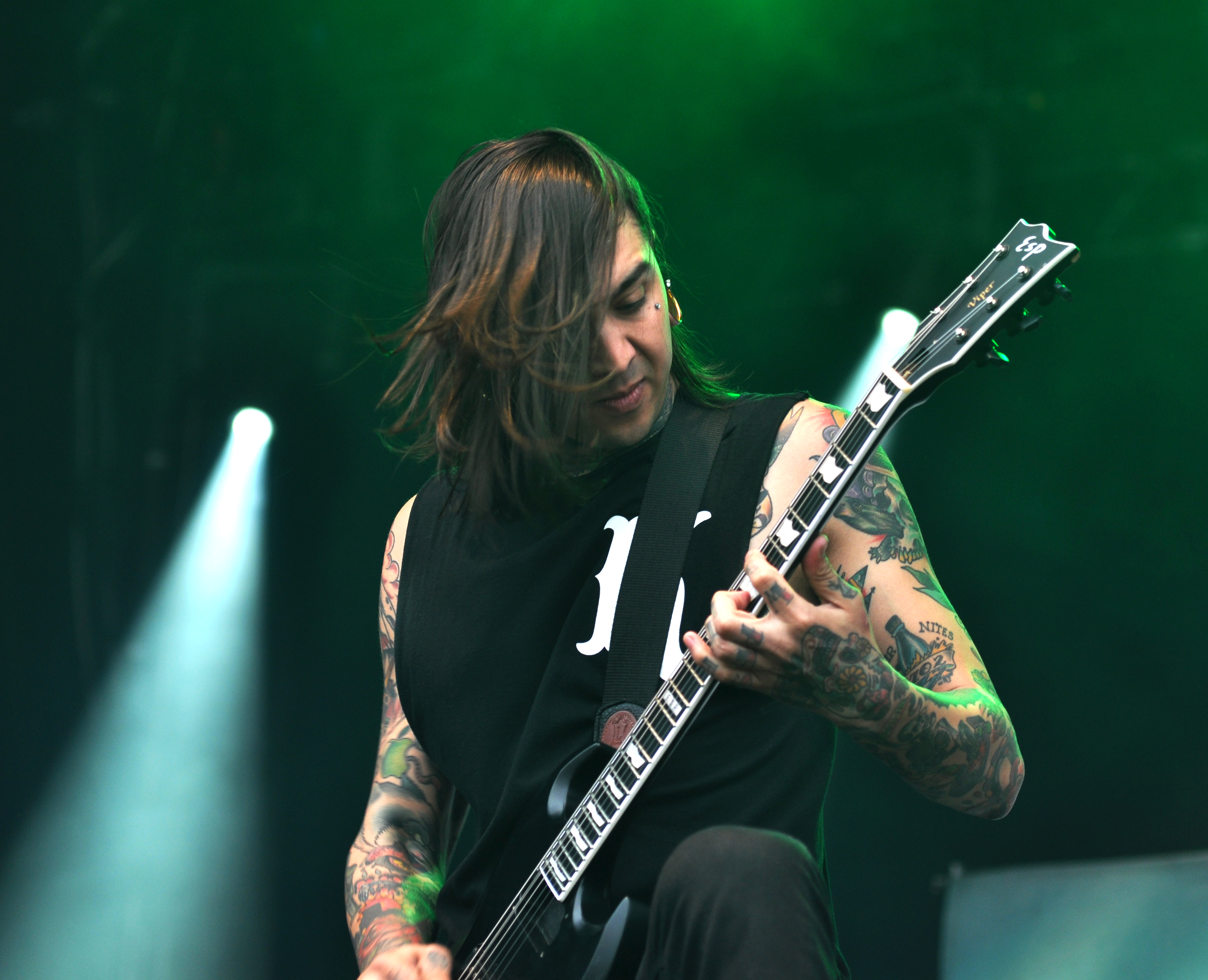
Perry in 2013 with one of his ESP Viper guitars.

When Perry initially joined Pierce the Veil, he heavily used a Gibson SG, which can be seen in the music videos for 'Chemical Kids and Mechanical Brides' and 'Yeah Boy and Doll Face', both off of A Flair for the Dramatic (2007). Perry later became an endorsee of ESP Guitars around the release of Collide with the Sky (2012) after heavily using a silverburst ESP EC1000 on the Selfish Machines tour, and later got his own signature model, the ESP Viper Slimer . Perry began using Fender guitars heavily with the release of Misadventures (2016), in particular a modified American Professional Fender Jazzmaster with a Seymour Duncan pickup and hardtail bridge conversion.

Since Pierce The Veil's return following the departure of founding drummer Mike Fuentes, Perry has very heavily used Fender Stratocaster guitars, including a collection of neon-painted Jim Root Stratocasters, which have been heavily used on music videos for The Jaws of Life (2023) and also during live sessions with Triple J in Sydney, Australia in July 2023.

As of the launch of their run on Blink-182's One More Time...Tour, Perry is running a collection of Jim Root Stratocasters, including a collection with neon cheetah patterns, and his orange 'funeral' Strat.

Perry used Marshall Amplification amplifiers prior to the band's hiatus, often using vintage Marshall Plexi heads fitted with the 'Dookie' mod, popularised by Green Day's Billie Joe Armstrong. Following Pierce the Veil's return, Perry has used Mesa/Boogie amplifiers, including the iconic Dual Rectifier, which was popular among Nu metal, Grunge and Pop punk guitarists.

Perry uses a mix of Seymour Duncan, EMG, and Fishman pickups. Perry also uses Ernie Ball Slinky guitar strings.

== Discography ==
=== Pierce the Veil ===
- A Flair for the Dramatic (2007)
- Selfish Machines (2010)
- Collide with the Sky (2012)
- Misadventures (2016)
- The Jaws of Life (2023)

== Awards ==
- AP Music Awards, Best Guitarist 2015 (won)
