= Misadventures (Pierce the Veil album) =

Studio album by Pierce the Veil
- Released: May 13, 2016
- Recorded: 2014–15; Long Island, New York
- Genre: Post-hardcore; skate punk; emo
- Length: 43:36
- Label: Fearless
- Producer: Dan Korneff

Pierce the Veil chronology
Collide with the Sky (2012)	Misadventures (2016)	The Jaws of Life (2023)

Singles from Misadventures
- 1. "The Divine Zero" Released: June 18, 2015; 2. "Texas Is Forever" Released: March 24, 2016; 3. "Circles" Released: April 26, 2016; 4. "Floral & Fading" Released: February 10, 2017; 5. "Today I Saw the Whole World" Released: October 11, 2017

Misadventures is the fourth studio album by American rock band Pierce the Veil released by Fearless Records on May 13, 2016. Initially expected to be released during the summer of 2015, the album was postponed several times before its subsequent release. The album serves as a follow-up to the group's third studio album, Collide with the Sky (2012). It was produced by Dan Korneff and was recorded throughout 2014 and 2015 on Long Island, New York. It was the last album to feature Mike Fuentes before he left the band in 2017 and took a step back on his music career.

As on the three previous albums, the lyrics mostly detail personal experiences of lead singer and frontman Vic Fuentes, such as failed relationships. However, for the first time, the band takes up a contemporary historical situation in a song. "Circles" is about the November 2015 terrorist attacks in Paris, which had resulted in the deaths of 130 civilians. When writing the songs, Fuentes was occasionally assisted by his friend Curtis Peoples, Tom Denney and Brad Hargreaves of Third Eye Blind.

The standard version of the album contains eleven tracks, including the singles "Texas Is Forever", "Circles" and "The Divine Zero". The deluxe version, released exclusively on CD in select countries, also includes acoustic versions of "Floral & Fading" and "Today I Saw the Whole World".

Misadventures received mostly positive reviews in the English-language trade press. It is the band's first album to chart outside of the United States, namely in Germany, Australia and the United Kingdom, among others.

Musically, the album is mainly post-hardcore, but contains influences from other styles of punk and rock music, such as pop-punk and pop rock.

== Background and recording ==
Singer Vic Fuentes and bassist Jaime Preciado announced in a video on December 23, 2013, that the group would be producing and releasing a new album in 2014. In an article by the Oakland Press, the band stated they had started writing new material together with Tom Denney whilst on tour with Mayday Parade, You Me at Six and All Time Low. The band finished writing new music after the winter European tour with Bring Me the Horizon in December 2013.

In an interview with Poppy Reid of The Music Network during the band's appearance at Soundwave Festival in Australia, the band spoke on collaborating with Jenna McDougall of Tonight Alive on a track from their fourth record. In May 2014, Pierce the Veil started pre-production for the new record. On June 5, 2014, Tony Perry and Vic Fuentes announced they would be flying to New Jersey in order to start recording their new album with producer Dan Korneff. In an interview with Alternative Press Vic Fuentes stated that the band was aiming for an early 2015 release date, pushed back from a 2014 release date. The reason for the pushed back release date was due to the band being several weeks behind due to two songs which the band wrote whilst they were recording the new album in the studio with producer Dan Korneff. The band's ambitions for an early 2015 release date did not surface, as the album was again pushed back for a later release. This release date would later be confirmed as May 2016. In an interview with the merchandising mail order company Impericon, it was said that the group moved into the studio immediately after the 2013 Europe tour with Bring Me the Horizon, and started writing the first new tracks. The musicians wanted to take as much time as possible when writing the pieces and not rush into anything. In an interview with the British music magazine Rock Sound, the band revealed that writing the new album took almost five months. The group began writing in a small rented house in San Diego, later relocating to Big Bear Lake in the San Bernardino Mountains, where they had previously written songs for their 2012 album, Collide with the Sky.

In mid-May 2014, the musicians began their songwriting efforts at the studio in South Park, San Diego. There, the first riffs for "Sambuka" and "Song for Isabelle" were created. In May 2014, Pierce the Veil started pre-production for the new record. On June 5, 2014, Tony Perry and Vic Fuentes announced that they would be flying to New Jersey to begin recording their new album with producer Dan Korneff. The album was recorded at Sonic Debris Recording Studio on Long Island, New York, and was produced by Korneff, who previously worked with the band on Collide with the Sky. Fuentes stated that “It was exciting to do another record with Dan [Korneff], we had gotten to know him really well on [our previous album], so there wasn’t that initial period where you’re trying to get to know each other. We just dove in and started to make music right away.” On August 4, 2014, the recordings of drums and electric bass were finished. The band wrote a total of thirteen tracks. After the group had finished writing and composing eleven tracks, they went into the studio and noticed that two songs would not fit into the album concept, so they wrote two new songs for the album, "Sambuka" and "Song for Isabelle". They were discarded and rewritten during Vic Fuentes' stay at the studio of David Hodges, a former Evanescence member, during pre-production of the song "Circles".

Recording and correcting Fuentes' vocal tracks took two months of studio time longer than originally planned. As a result, Vic Fuentes had to take the recording equipment with him on the first leg of their world tour with Sleeping with Sirens to do further work on the album there.

Commenting on the band's progression in songwriting ability, Vic Fuentes stated that “[Pierce the Veil] went into this record wanting to top the last one, which we try to do with every record, and we kept setting the bar higher and higher.”

== Album title ==
When questioned by Rock Sound on the meaning behind the album's title, lead vocalist Vic Fuentes stated that "it sort of represents our lives over the last couple of years of making this record. All the different steps that were taken, the different places it took us. Places where we wrote, places where we recorded, places where we lived, every unexpected turn that this whole thing brought us. It was one of those things where you set out with a plan and you know that sometimes things don’t go the way that you planned. That’s sort of what happened. There were all these different, unexpected turns that came our way, and us trying to find the end of the album. That’s what that title represented."

== Release ==
Plans for an upcoming album were initially announced on December 23, 2013 - the band released a holiday update announcing that they would have a new album coming out in 2014 again through Fearless Records. In an interview with Alternative Press Vic Fuentes stated that the band was aiming for an early 2015 release date, pushed back from 2014. The reason for the pushed back release date was due to the band being several weeks behind due to two songs which the band wrote whilst they were recording the new album in the studio with producer Dan Korneff. In November and December, the group went on a co-headlining US with Sleeping with Sirens with support from Beartooth and This Wild Life. The band's ambitions for an early 2015 release date did not surface as the album was again pushed back for a later release in 2016. Between January and March, the group embarked on a second leg of their co-headlining US tour with Sleeping with Sirens. They were supported by PVRIS and Mallory Knox.

On June 18, 2015, the band released "The Divine Zero", the first single from the album.

On March 18, 2016, it was announced that the album would be released on May 13 through Fearless Records. The album was produced by Dan Korneff. The band released the second single from the album, "Texas Is Forever" on March 24, 2016.

On April 26, 2016, Pierce the Veil released the album's third single, "Circles", on BBC radio and announced that they were touring the UK and Europe later in 2016. The single was also released as a digital download.

On May 13, the band released Misadventures with a concert in West Hall Sports Palace, in Mexico City in front of 4,000 fans.

On November 17, the band released a music video for the album's first track, "Dive In", showing behind-the-scenes footage from their most recent tours.

== Reception ==
Professional ratings
Aggregate scores
Source	Rating
Metacritic	86/100
Review scores
Source	Rating
AllMusic	4/5 stars
Alternative Press	4.5/5 stars
Blunt Magazine	5/5 stars
Exclaim!	7/10 stars
Kerrang!	4/5 stars
Rock Sound	8/10 stars

Misadventures was met with critical acclaim, based on 5 critics, the album currently holds an 86 rating on Metacritic, signifying 'universal acclaim'. Alternative Press gave it a 90/100 rating, and it quoted as stating: "Every single track is a winner. Misadventures expertly redraws PTV’s own map, celebrating their impossible blend of ambitious, creative obsessions and the electric crackle of raw intensity". Kerrang! Magazine stated "Misadventures has proudly claimed the belt as Pierce The Veil's best offering to date", giving it 80/100.

Peyton Bernhardt of Blunt Magazine gave the album 5/5 and wrote "listening to Pierce The Veil’s output should follow the same principle that the international mining industry does: the deeper you dig, the more value you’ll find. One run-through of this LP simply won’t do – there’s too much to discover."

Andy Biddulph of Rock Sound scored the album 8/10 and stated that 'Misadventures’ represents a rich, more polished version of the Pierce The Veil that broke out on 2012's ‘Collide With The Sky’.

In addition, Lisa Vanderwyk of Exclaim! gave the album 7/10 and praised Vic Fuentes for his performance stating that, "His crooning is familiar, but sharper now; he maintains stellar vocal performances throughout, dropping effortlessly from his head voice to guttural wails."

== Track listing ==
All lyrics are written by Vic Fuentes, except outro on "Song for Isabelle", written by John Klemmer, Ahmad Lewis, and Stefan K. Gordy; all music is composed by Pierce the Veil, except where noted.

Standard edition
No.	Title	Music	Length
1.	"Dive In"		4:52
2.	"Texas Is Forever"		3:39
3.	"The Divine Zero"	V. Fuentes; Curtis Peoples; Brad Hargreaves	4:08
4.	"Floral & Fading"		3:29
5.	"Phantom Power and Ludicrous Speed"		3:50
6.	"Circles"	V. Fuentes; Peoples; Steve Miller	3:44
7.	"Today I Saw the Whole World"	V. Fuentes; Peoples	3:41
8.	"Gold Medal Ribbon"		3:58
9.	"Bedless"		4:44
10.	"Sambuka"	Pierce the Veil; Tom Denney	2:36
11.	"Song for Isabelle"		4:50

Deluxe edition
No.	Title	Music	Length
12.	"Floral & Fading" (acoustic)		3:48
13.	"Today I Saw the Whole World" (acoustic)	V. Fuentes; Peoples	3:27

== Personnel ==
=== Pierce the Veil ===
- Vic Fuentes – lead vocals, rhythm guitar, keyboards
- Tony Perry – lead guitar
- Jaime Preciado – bass, backing vocals
- Mike Fuentes – drums, percussion, art concept

=== Additional personnel ===
- Dave Yaden – all keyboards
- Curtis Peoples – gang vocals on "Circles" and "Today I Saw The Whole World"

=== Production ===
- Dan Korneff – production, mixing, M chord and claps on "Dive In"
- Alex Prieto – engineering, digital editing, drum tech, guitar decimation on "Bedless"
- Matthew Kirby – engineering, digital editing, leslie guitar on "Today I Saw The Whole World"
- Nick Sferlazza – assistant engineering, M chord on "Dive In"
- Jim Romano – digital editing
- Ted Jensen – mastering at Sterling Sound, New York, NY

=== Management ===
- Michele Abreim – management
- Chris Foitle – A&R
- Jenny Reader – project management
- Dave Shapiro (United Talent Agency) – booking
- Tom Taaffe (United Talent Agency) – UK/Europe booking
- Rosemary Carroll (Carroll, Guido & Groffman) – legal representation
- Zeisler, Zeisler, Rawson & Johnson – business management

=== Artwork ===
- Mike Cortada – artwork and layout

== Charts ==
=== Weekly charts ===
Chart (2016)	Peak position
Australian Albums (ARIA)	12
Belgian Albums (Ultratop Flanders)	83
Canadian Albums (Billboard)	13
German Albums (Offizielle Top 100)	98
Irish Albums (IRMA)	68
New Zealand Albums (RMNZ)	22
Scottish Albums (OCC)	10
UK Albums (OCC)	17
UK Rock & Metal Albums ( OCC)	1
US Billboard 200	4
US Top Alternative Albums (Billboard)	1
US Digital Albums (Billboard)	5
US Top Hard Rock Albums (Billboard)	1
US Independent Albums (Billboard)	1
US Top Rock Albums (Billboard)	1
US Vinyl Albums (Billboard)	3

=== Year-end charts ===
Chart (2016)	Position
US Top Rock Albums (Billboard)	34
US Top Hard Rock Albums	9

== Release history ==
Release dates and formats for Misadventures
Region	Date	Format	Label	Edition	Ref.
Various	May 13, 2016	CD; digital download; LP record; streaming	Fearless	Standard	
Various	May 13, 2016	CD	Fearless	Deluxe	
Japan	June 25, 2016	CD	Kick Rock Invasion; Triple Vision	Deluxe	
