= Vic Fuentes =

American musician (born 1983)

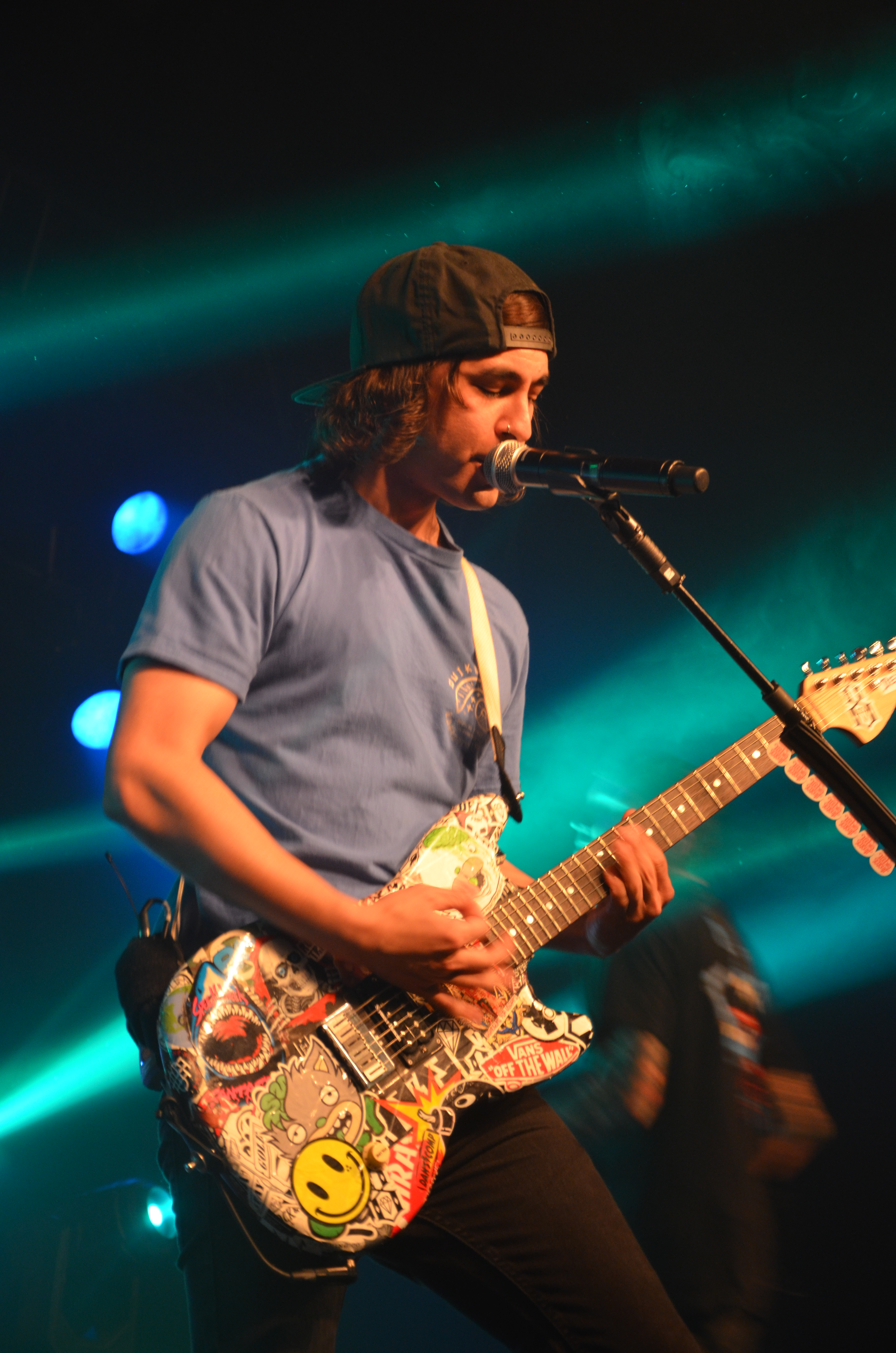
- Fuentes in 2016
- Born: Victor Vincent Fuentes; February 10, 1983 (age 43); San Diego, California, U.S.
- Occupations: Singer; songwriter
- Years active: 1998–present
- Spouse: Danielle Perry (m. 2022)
- Children: 2
- Relatives: Mike Fuentes (brother); Nick Martin (cousin)
- Musical career
- Genres: Post-hardcore; pop-punk; experimental rock; emo; pop screamo; punk rock
- Instruments: Vocals; guitar
- Member of: Pierce the Veil
- Formerly of: Before Today
- Website: piercetheveil.net

Victor Vincent Fuentes (born February 10, 1983) is an American musician. He is the co-founder, lead vocalist and rhythm guitarist of the post-hardcore band Pierce the Veil, which he formed with his brother Mike Fuentes in 2006.

== Early life ==
Fuentes was born on February 10, 1983, in San Diego, California, to Vivian K. Fuentes and Victor Gamboa Fuentes, a painter and former jazz musician. He has a younger brother, Mike Fuentes, two half-brothers, and one half-sister. He is related to Nick Martin, who currently plays in Sleeping with Sirens, and Coal Flower, a lesser-known independent artist.

At age seven, Fuentes learned to play guitar. After attending Mission Bay High School, he attended San Diego State University, where he studied graphic design. He quit studying after his former band Before Today was signed to Equal Vision Records.

He is friends with Curtis Peoples, who was co-writer of the single "King for a Day". They played together in a band called 3 Simple Words while attending high school.

== Career ==
During his time at Mission Bay High School Fuentes played in a local punk band called 3 Simple Words alongside Curtis Peoples, who later worked together with Pierce the Veil on some songs, including "King for a Day".

In 1998 he formed a band called Early Times with his younger brother Mike. After releasing three EPs the band was forced to rename due to copyright violation. The group changed their name to "Before Today". After signing a recording contract with Equal Vision Records the band released their only album, A Celebration of an Ending, in 2004 before breaking up two years later.

In 2007 the duo released their debut record, A Flair for the Dramatic, with the newformed band called Pierce the Veil. With this band Fuentes released four more albums, Selfish Machines, Collide with the Sky, Misadventures, and The Jaws of Life (Pierce the Veil album) after integrating bassist Jaime Preciado and guitarist, Tony Perry. He toured in North America, South America, Australia, Asia and Europe several times, played at big music festivals such as Rock am Ring and Rock im Park, Reading and Leeds, Warped Tour, Soundwave Festival and Slam Dunk Festival. On concert tours Fuentes shared stage with acts including Bring Me the Horizon, All Time Low, Sleeping with Sirens, Tonight Alive and A Day to Remember.

Alongside his brother, he was involved in the short-lived supergroup Isles & Glaciers with musicians including Jonny Craig, Craig Owens, Brian Southall, Nick Martin and Matt Goddard. After playing only one show at SXSW 2009 and releasing only one EP (The Hearts of Lonely People) in 2010, the band broke up.

Fuentes was also a session guitarist for a short North American tour with the short-lived pop punk band Cinematic Sunrise.

In November 2022, Fuentes was featured on Cavetown's album worm food on track 4, titled "a kind thing to do".

== Artistry ==
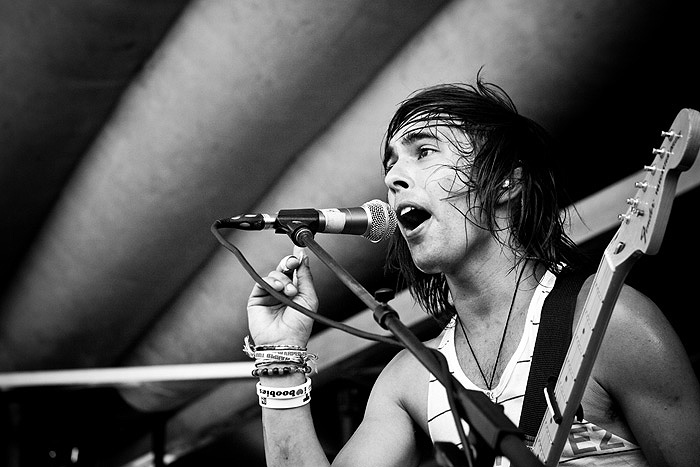
Fuentes performing in 2008

=== Songwriting ===
Fuentes has written songs with the likes of Tom Denney, Curtis Peoples and Dave Yaden. When asked in a 2012 interview about the lyrical themes on Collide with the Sky, Fuentes said he did not want to "go with any sort of concept or anything like that". He added that Pierce The Veil is inspired by the band's experiences with their family, lives, relationships, tours, and friends.

Events from Fuentes' personal life have served as subjects in numerous Pierce The Veil songs. "Million Dollar Houses (The Painter)" from the 2010 album Selfish Machines is about Fuentes' parents: "No matter how bad things got, they've always had each other". The song "A Match Into Water", from Pierce the Veil's third album Collide with the Sky, was written by Fuentes for his former girlfriend who was suffering from breast cancer.

Multiple songs written by Fuentes are directly inspired by fans. The song "Bulls in the Bronx" from the album Collide with the Sky was written in honor of an Australian fan who committed suicide in April 2012. "I Don't Care If You Are Contagious", from the 2010 album Selfish Machines, was inspired by a fan who contacted the band. She wrote that her boyfriend, whom she met for the first time during a Pierce the Veil concert, had died in a car accident. In response, Fuentes wrote the song as a "gift to her".

=== Vocal style ===
Vic Fuentes is well known for his high vocal range, which was compared to Claudio Sanchez from Coheed and Cambria by Elmar Salmutter, writing for the German Metal Hammer magazine.

== Equipment ==
Fuentes is known for his mainstay Gibson Explorer, with a finish reminiscent of the EVH 'Eruption' finish. Another notable guitar of Fuentes' is his 'Slimer' Taylor SB1-X, which he used in the "King for a Day" music video, and while touring in support of their 2012 album Collide with the Sky.

Recently, Fuentes has been using a white-on-white Fender Custom Shop Telecaster while performing "Hold On Till May" live, often giving a Squier look alike of it to a fan he brings up on stage to sing Lindsey Stamey's lines.

== Personal life ==
In 2012, Fuentes met actress and model Danielle Victoria during the filming of the music video for "King for a Day". The two began a relationship sometime in 2014 and became engaged in 2021. The couple married on April 2 the following year. On September 13, 2022, Vic and Danielle announced that they were expecting their first child together. They welcomed a daughter, Violet Valentine, on February 9, 2023. They later had a son, Emery Stone, on February 15, 2025.

== Accolades ==
- Alternative Press Music Awards
  - 2014: Best vocalist (nominated)
  - 2015: Best vocalist (nominated)

== Discography ==
=== Early Times ===
- No Turning Back (2000)

=== Before Today ===
- A Celebration of an Ending (2004)

=== Pierce the Veil ===
- A Flair for the Dramatic (2007)
- Selfish Machines (2010)
- Collide with the Sky (2012)
- Misadventures (2016)
- The Jaws of Life (2023)

=== Isles & Glaciers ===
- The Hearts of Lonely People (2010)

=== Guest appearances ===
Year	Song	Album	Artist
2007	"Higher Than Kites" (feat. Vic Fuentes)	Demo	Lower Definition
2009	"Aviation" (feat. Vic Fuentes)	The City, the Circus EP	Misdelphia
2010	"Love Is a Cat from Hell" (feat. Vic Fuentes)	Illuminaudio	Chiodos
2012	"Somebody That I Used to Know (Gotye Cover)" (feat. Vic Fuentes)	Punk Goes Pop 5	Mayday Parade
2013	"A Love Like War" (feat. Vic Fuentes)	Don't Panic	All Time Low
2014	"Starving for Friends" (feat. Vic Fuentes)	Through Art We Are All Equals	Slaves
2014	"Sad News in a Quiet Room" (feat. Vic Fuentes)	Wandermere EP	Keyes
2022	"a kind thing to do" (feat. Vic Fuentes)	worm food	Cavetown
2023	"Irish Goodbye" (feat. Vic Fuentes)	Mono	K.Flay
