= Pierce the Veil =

American rock band

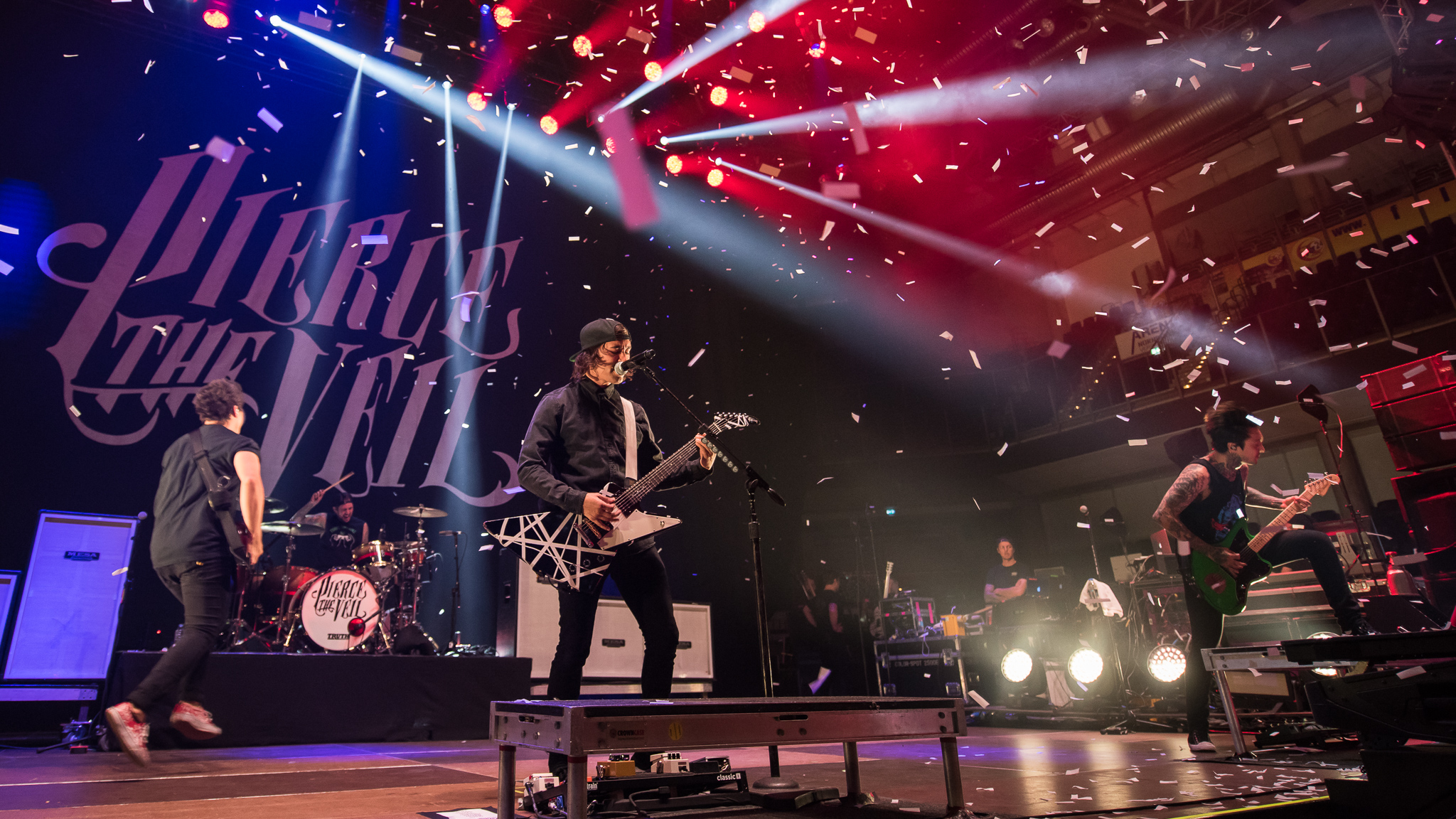
- Pierce the Veil performing at Rock im Park 2017 in Nuremberg, Germany

Background information
- Origin: San Diego, California, U.S.
- Genres: Post-hardcore; pop-punk; experimental rock; emo; pop screamo
- Works: Pierce the Veil discography
- Years active: 2006–present
- Labels: Equal Vision; Fearless
- Spinoffs: Isles & Glaciers
- Spinoff of: Early Times; Before Today
- Members: Vic Fuentes; Tony Perry; Jaime Preciado
- Past members: Mike Fuentes
- Website: piercetheveil.net

Pierce the Veil is an American rock band formed in San Diego, California, in 2006. It was founded by brothers Vic and Mike Fuentes after the disbanding of Before Today, which formed out of the San Diego punk scene. Jaime Preciado and Tony Perry joined the group in 2007, on bass and lead guitar respectively.

Pierce the Veil has released five studio albums and has toured worldwide since the release of their debut album, A Flair for the Dramatic in 2007. The band released their second full-length studio album, titled Selfish Machines in 2010. Their third album, Collide with the Sky, was released in 2012, and is their first album released by Fearless Records. Featuring the hit first single "King for a Day", the album debuted at No. 12 on the US Billboard 200. Their fourth album, Misadventures, was released on May 13, 2016, and after a hiatus, their fifth album, The Jaws of Life, came out on February 10, 2023.

== History ==
=== 2006–2009: Early years and A Flair for the Dramatic ===
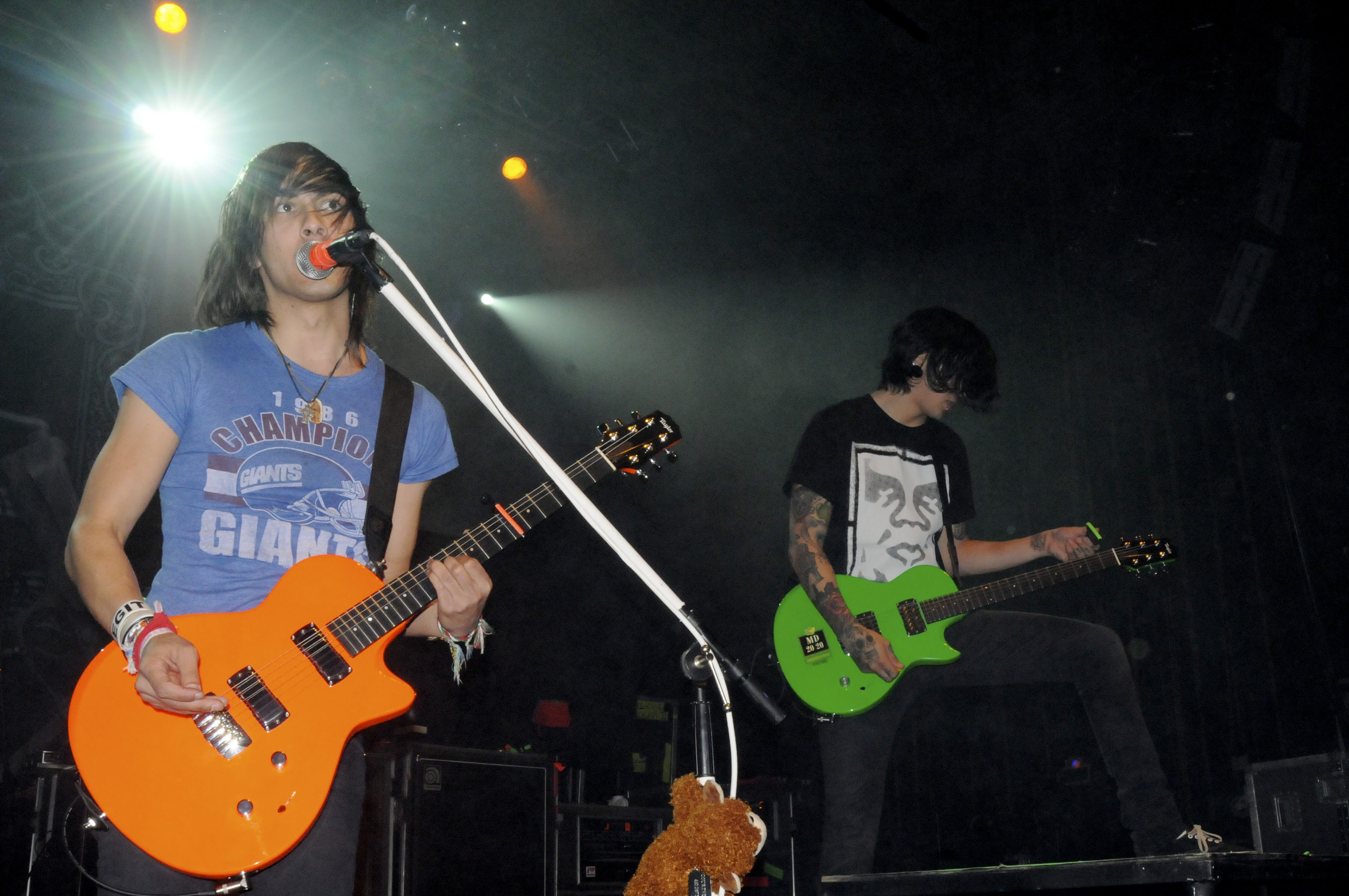
Pierce The Veil in 2007

Pierce the Veil was founded by Mike Fuentes and Vic Fuentes in 2006, after the disbandment of their band Before Today (formerly known as Early Times). The brothers continued to write songs together and eventually came up with enough material for a new full-length album. Still backed by their label, Equal Vision Records, they wrote and recorded an entire album on their own in Seattle with producer Casey Bates. The brothers released the album A Flair for the Dramatic on June 26, 2007, under a new name: Pierce the Veil, which is derived from a song of the same name from Before Today's album, A Celebration of an Ending. Soon after, Pierce the Veil acquired Tony Perry (lead guitar) and Jaime Preciado (bass) as members. Pierce the Veil toured vigorously for about 3 months after the release of A Flair for the Dramatic. They have toured with bands including A Day to Remember, Chiodos, From First to Last, Emery, pop-punk band All Time Low, Sleeping with Sirens, The Devil Wears Prada, and Mayday Parade.

In November 2007, Pierce the Veil performed one date on the Vans Warped Tour 2007, and were on the entire tour in 2008. They played the Bamboozle Left in 2008. Their first headlining tour, called The Delicious Tour, which took place in October–November 2008, featured Breathe Carolina, Four Letter Lie, and Emarosa. They ended their record cycle with the Taste of Chaos 2009 tour along with Bring Me the Horizon, Thursday, Four Year Strong, and Cancer Bats. Vic and Mike Fuentes with Ayrton Jara confirmed to be included in the new project and supergroup Isles & Glaciers, featuring vocalists Craig Owens of Chiodos and Jonny Craig of Emarosa. The "supergroup" released its first EP titled The Hearts of Lonely People on March 9, 2010. However Isles & Glaciers has broken up, saying "Isles & Glaciers was only a one time thing".

=== 2009–2011: Selfish Machines ===
During August 2009, Pierce the Veil announced that they were currently in studio recording new material for their next album. After a few months off the road and building anticipation for their sophomore release, the band moved to Los Angeles to record their album Selfish Machines with Producer Mike Green. Singer and lyricist Vic Fuentes stated, "The title refers to human nature and the animal-like qualities inside all of us that we try and hide, but should just learn to accept. We are all selfish machines and we all have natural tendencies to want, love, and take." Selfish Machines was released on June 21, 2010, under Equal Vision, and went to No. 1 on the Billboard Heatseekers Chart. In support of the release, the band played a number of festivals including the Bamboozle Left, South by Southwest, Never Say Never Festival, and the Vans Warped Tour. The band also contributed a cover of Blue Öyster Cult's classic song "(Don't Fear) The Reaper" to the Punk Goes Classic Rock compilation, released on April 27, 2010. They were a part of the Take Action Tour with Attack Attack! going to New Zealand and Australia, and played on the Versus Tour in Japan with Confide. They played the "This Is a Family Tour" with Emmure, In Fear and Faith, Of Mice & Men, and Attack Attack!, which lasted until late December 2010.

Pierce the Veil played at the Fox Theater in Pomona, California as a surprise appearance as part of the Alternative Press Tour 2010 with August Burns Red, Bring Me the Horizon, Polar Bear Club, Emarosa, and This Is Hell. On November 1, 2010, the band announced that they would be kicking off 2011 touring with Silverstein, Miss May I, The Chariot, and A Bullet for Pretty Boy on the "Winterizer Tour". Throughout March and April, "The Gamechanger's Tour" with A Day to Remember, Bring Me the Horizon, and label mates We Came as Romans followed. They also co-headlined the second leg of Escape the Fate's headlining tour "The Dead Masquerade". After taking the summer off to spend some more time on writing new material, the band was supposed to head out on their first ever South American Tour supporting Sum 41 in September; however, due to illness of Sum 41's frontman, the tour was cancelled. They finished up the year touring Europe with blessthefall and co-headlined the No Guts No Glory Tour with Miss May I afterwards. They once again contributed to a "Punk Goes..." album, Punk Goes Pop 4, covering the song "Just the Way You Are" by Bruno Mars, which was released on November 21, 2011.

=== 2011–2013: Fearless Records and Collide with the Sky ===
On August 23, 2011, Pierce the Veil signed with Fearless Records. On December 22, 2011, a video update revealed in that in early 2012, the band would be going into the studio to record their third studio album. On December 26, 2011, Vic Fuentes announced on the band's Facebook page that the band had finished writing the songs for their third album, which they began writing during the summer and while on tour with Miss May I, Woe Is Me, The Amity Affliction, and letlive during November and December, and they would now be choosing a producer to work with on the album in early 2012. On February 27, 2012, The band issued an update on their official Facebook page saying that they have chosen to work with producers Dan Korneff and Kato Khandwala at the House of Loud in New Jersey on their upcoming third album. On April 20, 2012, it was announced that the new album would be titled Collide with the Sky and would be released through Fearless Records on July 17, 2012. On May 17, 2012, the album cover and the track list of the new album were revealed along with the announcement of the band's first ever UK headlining tour in September 2012. The first single from the new album, "King for a Day", features Kellin Quinn of Sleeping with Sirens and was released on June 5, 2012. The second single, "Bulls in the Bronx", was released three weeks later on June 26, 2012.

In order to promote the album, the band appeared on the Vans Warped Tour from June 16, 2012, to August 5, 2012, playing the event's main stage for the first time. They were regularly joined on stage by Kellin Quinn to perform the song "King for a Day". After Warped, Pierce the Veil embarked on their first headlining tour in the UK, selling out almost all of the dates. Their following headlining tour in the US, The Collide with the Sky tour, saw a similar success. They ended the year appearing at No. 33 in Rock Sound magazine's best albums of 2012 list as well as winning nine categories in the best of 2012 reader's poll conducted by Alternative Press, including Best Live Band of the Year, Album of the Year and Artist of the Year. On January 9, 2013, Vic Fuentes released information that he had recently been in the studio writing new songs with Tom Denney.

On January 7, 2013, Pierce the Veil and All Time Low announced that they would be co-headlining the Spring Fever Tour in Spring 2013. Both bands toured across the United States, along with opening acts Mayday Parade and You Me at Six, an English band. The tour began on April 11, 2013, and ended on May 12, 2013. Toward the end of the tour, on May 7, 2013, the music video for Pierce the Veil's song "Bulls in the Bronx" was released.

=== 2013–2015: This Is a Wasteland and World Tour ===
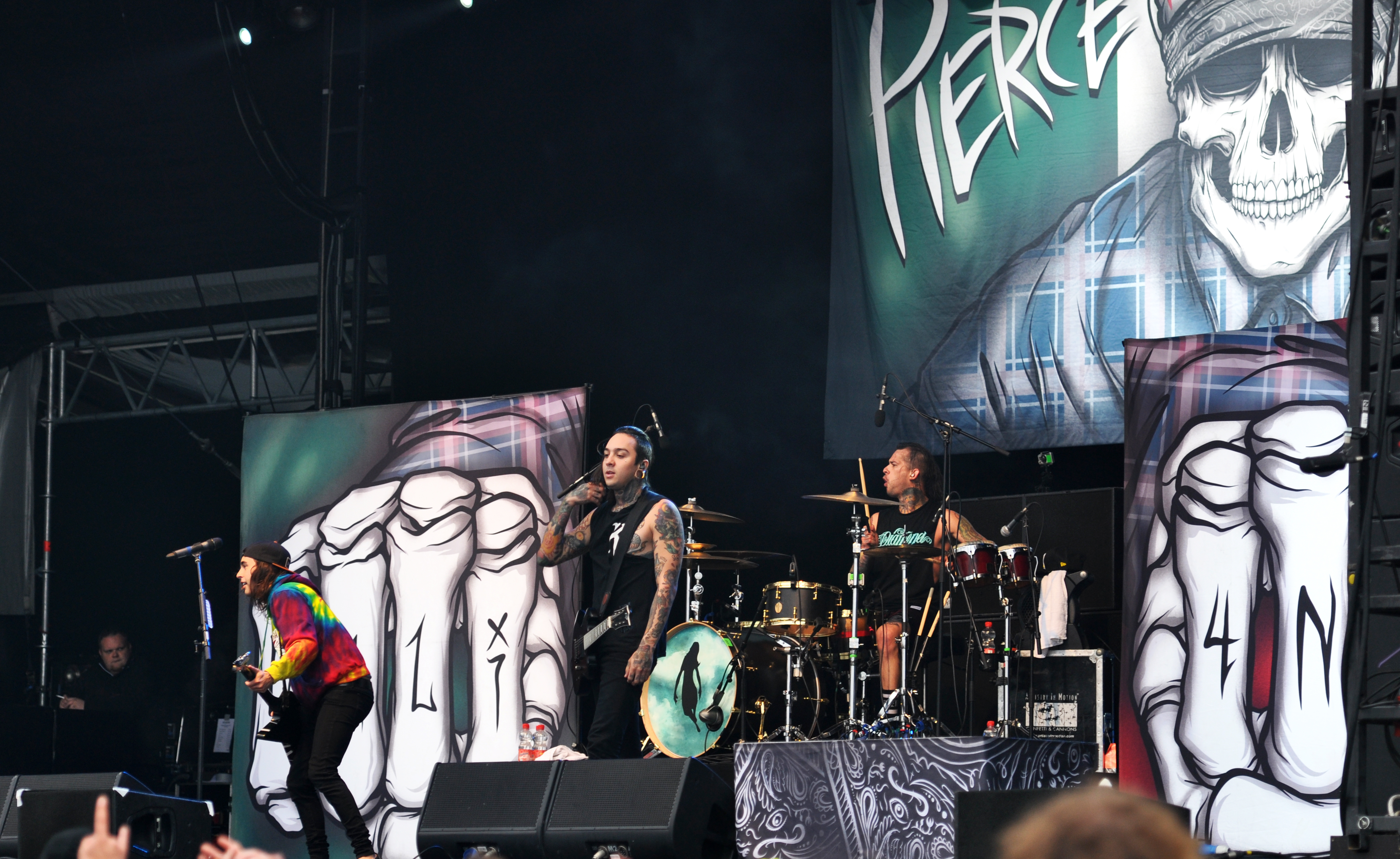
Pierce the Veil performing at Rock am Ring 2013 in Nürburg, Germany

On September 23, 2013, the band announced plans to release a documentary on November 11 about their first world tour. It included live footage from their world tour, three music videos, and additional content. The band released a statement on the documentary: "Our first world tour was absolutely the craziest experience of our lives.. [sic] and we filmed EVERYTHING! Follow along as we visit uncharted territories in search of the best shows and thrilling experiences we could absolutely find along the way. This DVD is for the fans and the fans only. Thank you for letting us travel the world and share this adventure with you!" - Vic, Mike, Tony, and Jaime On October 18, 2013, the band launched pre-orders for their documentary with a new release date of November 25.

On July 21, Vic Fuentes and Kellin Quinn of Sleeping with Sirens announced a co-headlining world concert tour. The tour started on November 5, 2014, in Fresno. They first announced the first North America leg with 20 concerts with support from Beartooth and This Wild Life. A month later, on August 22, 2014, the band confirmed the second leg of the concert tour which took place in Europe. Between March 20, 2015, and April 11, 2015, Pierce the Veil played concerts in the Netherlands, Belgium, Sweden, Germany, and the UK. According to Epitaph Records, all of the concerts in Europe were sold out. Before going to Europe the band played a second U.S. leg with support from PVRIS and Mallory Knox.

=== 2015–2018: Misadventures and departure of Mike Fuentes ===
The band's fourth studio album, Misadventures, was released on May 13, 2016 through Fearless Records. Produced by Dan Korneff, the album spawned the singles "The Divine Zero" and "Texas Is Forever".

In November 2017, drummer Mike Fuentes was accused of soliciting nude photos and statutory rape by a young woman. The incidents were alleged to have occurred roughly a decade prior over the course of several years. The pair allegedly initiated contact on MySpace before meeting for the first time at a Pierce the Veil concert. Fuentes was 24 at the time, while the girl was 16, a legal minor in the state of California. The woman stated they had sex after meeting again at a concert during Warped Tour. The relationship was said to have lasted until she turned 18.

In December 2017, a second woman accused him of requesting nude pictures when she was a minor. She accused him anonymously on Twitter. The woman claimed they first met at Warped Tour in 2008, when she was 14 years old where they exchanged phone numbers. When she turned 15, Fuentes allegedly requested nude photos from her.

In light of the allegations, Fuentes and the rest of the band released a statement later that month, stating that Mike Fuentes was to step down as drummer to "concentrate on his personal life". The band announced a hiatus and cancelled their planned 2018 UK tour with All Time Low. No formal charges were brought publicly against Mike Fuentes for either allegation.

=== 2018–present: Hiatus and The Jaws of Life ===
On July 5, 2018, vocalist and guitarist Vic Fuentes posted on his social media that he is working on the band's fifth album. In February 2019, the official band Twitter posted that they were still working on the album. On 13 April 2020, the band uploaded a home rehearsal of their track "Hold On Till May" to YouTube, in light of the COVID-19 pandemic. The performance featured former member Mike Fuentes, however the band did not specify whether he had officially returned as a member of the band. Reaction to Mike Fuentes performing with the band was mixed, with listeners expressing concern on social media over the sexual misconduct allegations surrounding him, with the band having yet to address them fully beyond the original 2017 statement. On August 24, 2020, Vic confirmed that Mike had left the band in 2017 and will not be featured on the next album.

In June 2022, I Prevail announced their “True Power Tour,” scheduled to take place from September to November 2022, with Pierce The Veil serving as direct support, this being the band’s first tour since 2017 and the departure of drummer Mike Fuentes. Prior to the tour, the band recruiting former letlive. drummer Lionel Robinson as their touring drummer. On September 1, 2022, the band released the single "Pass the Nirvana". On November 11, 2022, the band released their second new single, "Emergency Contact" and announced that their fifth studio album The Jaws of Life would be released on February 10, 2023.

The band embarked on the 'Creative Control' and 'The Jaws of Life' tours, along with an Australian tour with Beartooth in support of the album. In mid-2024, the band supported Blink-182 on their One More Time... tour in North America.

On December 3, 2024, the band announced the I Can't Hear You World Tour via social media. The tour featured songs from every album in the band’s discography, and it was the band’s first solo headlining amphitheater tour. On May 6, 2025, the band released "Kiss Me Now", adding the single to their fifth studio album The Jaws of Life.

On May 22, 2025, a plane crash in San Diego, specifically the 2025 San Diego Cessna Citation II crash killed six people, with their agent and manager Dave Shapiro being one of the victims. Vic Fuentes expressed his condolences via the band's Facebook page the following day, with the full band expressing condolences as well at the concert on May 24, 2025 in Bristow during their I Can't Hear You World Tour.

In February 2026, the band was announced as part of the lineup for the Louder Than Life music festival in Louisville, scheduled to take place in September.

On September 12, 2026, Pierce the Veil finished off their “I Can’t Hear You World Tour” at Petco Park in Downtown San Diego. The sold-out homecoming show, which hosted over 40,000 people, was said to be the biggest venue and crowd the band had ever played, as announced by lead singer and guitarist Vic Fuentes during the performances. The concert itself was preceded by various festivities and unique treats for local fans. Amongst these were the interactive four-day Pierce the Veil merch Pop-Up Shop, which was hosted by The Finest Collective from September 10 through September 13. There had also been the releases of a limited-edition Stone Brewing Pierce the Veil IPA on August 29, and a limited-edition Pierce the Veil-themed pizza named “La Chona” released by New York Prince St. Pizza on September 3.

== Musical style ==
Pierce the Veil's music style has generally been regarded as a mix of post-hardcore, pop-punk, experimental rock, emo, and pop screamo.

Their debut album A Flair for the Dramatic has been described as a mixture of emo, screamo and progressive rock. According to German music magazine Intro the compositions on their debut album are "complex" and were compared to artists including Sparta, And You Will Know Us by the Trail of Dead, and partly even to Queen. The vocals of Vic Fuentes have been compared to Claudio Sanchez of Coheed and Cambria.

Their sophomore album, Selfish Machines, was partly influenced by punk music and has been compared to bands like Emarosa, Chiodos, The Used, and Alesana. The band was praised by The Morning Call for the band's mix of metal and hardcore punk with the songwriting and melodies of pop music.

Their third album, Collide with the Sky, was widely praised for its elements of progressive rock. It describes the music as sounding more pop-oriented compared to the previous albums. The critic Florian Kapp, also praises the use of Spanish guitars.

Their fourth album, Misadventures, leaned more towards pop and pop-punk. The album was compared to artists like Atreyu, My Chemical Romance, and Panic! at the Disco.

This shift in musical style was further developed on their fifth studio album, The Jaws of Life, released in 2023. The musicians increasingly oriented themselves towards genres such as indie rock and alternative rock, moving even closer to pop music and further away from their musical roots. Influences of grunge are also recognized. This change in style was predominantly criticized negatively in German-language media, while it was received positively in the English-language press.

The term "mexicore" has also been applied to the band due to the Spanish flair in many of their songs. Vic Fuentes said in an interview with Alternative Press that the band always tries to "incorporate at least a hint of Latin influence in every song." Vic Fuentes described "mexicore" as a "mix of heavy music with a little Spanish feel."

They have cited influences including Thrice, As I Lay Dying, Saves the Day, Blink-182, Green Day, AFI, American Nightmare, Bad Religion, Anti-Flag and Voodoo Glow Skulls.

== Band members ==
=== Current ===
- Vic Fuentes – lead vocals, rhythm guitar, keyboards, piano, programming (2006–present); lead guitar, bass (2006–2007)
- Tony Perry – lead guitar (2007–present)
- Jaime Preciado – bass, backing vocals (2007–present); keyboards, programming (2022–present)

=== Former ===
- Mike Fuentes – drums (2006–2017); programming, backing vocals (2006–2007)

=== Touring ===
- Jesse Barrera – lead guitar (2015)
- Loniel Robinson – drums (2022–present)

== Discography ==
=== Studio albums ===
- A Flair for the Dramatic (2007)
- Selfish Machines (2010)
- Collide with the Sky (2012)
- Misadventures (2016)
- The Jaws of Life (2023)

== Awards and nominations ==
Awards and Nominations
Year	Award giving body	Category	Nominated work	Results
2010	PETA2 Liberation Award	Breakthrough Artist	—N/a	Won
2010	San Diego Music Awards	Best Alternative Album	"Selfish Machines"	Nominated
2013	Kerrang! Awards	Best Video	"King for a Day"	Won
2013	Kerrang! Awards	Best Single	"King for a Day"	Nominated
2013	Kerrang! Awards	Best International Newcomer	—N/a	Nominated
2013	Kerrang! Awards	Best International Band	—N/a	Nominated
2013	Rock Sound Readers Poll	Band of the Year	—N/a	Won
2014	Alternative Press Music Awards	Best Live Band	—N/a	Won
2014	Alternative Press Music Awards	Best Bassist	(for Jamie Preciado)	Won
2014	Alternative Press Music Awards	Best Drummer	(for Mike Fuentes)	Won
2014	Alternative Press Music Awards	Best Vocalist	(for Vic Fuentes)	Nominated
2014	Alternative Press Music Awards	Band of the Year	—N/a	Nominated
2014	Alternative Press Music Awards	Most Dedicated Fans	—N/a	Nominated
2014	Alternative Press Music Awards	Philanthropic Award	(for Keep A Breast Foundation)	Nominated
2014	Revolver Golden Gods Awards	Best Video/Film	"This is a Wasteland"	Won
2015	Alternative Press Music Awards	Best Guitarist	(for Tony Perry)	Won
2015	Kerrang! Awards	Best Fanbase	—N/a	Won
2016	Alternative Press Music Awards	Song of the Year	"The Divine Zero"	Nominated
2016	MTV Fandom Awards	Bandom of the Year	—N/a	Nominated
2016	Revolver Music Awards	Most Dedicated Fanbase	—N/a	Won
2017	iHeartRadio Music Awards	Best Underground Alternative Band	—N/a	Won
2017	Libera Awards	Best Metal/Hard Rock Album	"Misadventures"	Nominated
2017	San Diego Music Awards	Album of the Year	"Misadventures"	Nominated
2017	San Diego Music Awards	Song of the Year	"Circles"	Nominated

== Tours ==
- The Delicious Tour (2008)
- 2011 Europe Tour (2011)
- No Guts, No Glory Tour (with Miss May I) (2011)
- 2012 UK Tour (2012)
- Collide with the Sky Tour (2012)
- 2013 Southeast Asia Tour (2013)
- Street Youth Rising Tour (2013)
- Spring Fever Tour (with All Time Low) (2013)
- 2013 UK Tour (2013)
- Latin American Tour 2013 (2013)
- PTV/SWS World Tour (with Sleeping with Sirens) (2014–2015)
- The Misadventures Tour (2016)
- South America/Mexico Tour 2016 (2016)
- Australian Tour 2016 (2016)
- Made to Destroy Tour (2016)
- U.K./Europe Tour 2016 (2016)
- Rest in Space Tour (2017)
- We Will Detonate! Tour (2017)
- Live in the UK (2022)
- The Jaws of Life Tour (2023–2024)
- Creative Control Tour (with The Used) (2023)
- Beartooth & Pierce the Veil Australia Tour 2023 (with Beartooth) (2023)
- I Can't Hear You World Tour (2025)

== See also ==
- List of Pierce the Veil concert tours
