= A Flair for the Dramatic =

2007 studio album by Pierce the Veil

Studio album by Pierce the Veil
- Released: June 26, 2007
- Recorded: 2007
- Studios: Johnny Cab Studios / The Tank Studio, Seattle, Washington
- Genres: Post-hardcore; emo; screamo; progressive rock
- Length: 40:29
- Label: Equal Vision
- Producers: Vic Fuentes; Casey Bates

Pierce the Veil chronology
A Flair for the Dramatic (2007)	Selfish Machines (2010)

A Flair for the Dramatic is the debut studio album by American rock band Pierce the Veil, released in 2007 by Equal Vision Records. It was released on June 26, 2007, following the breakup of Vic and Mike Fuentes' previous band, Before Today, in the fall of the previous year.

The album consists of eleven tracks and a bonus track on the iTunes download version. It is the first album the musicians released through Equal Vision Records. It is also the only album Pierce the Veil recorded without their later bandmates Jaime Preciado (bass) and Tony Perry (guitar).

== Background and recording ==
After Before Today disbanded in the fall of 2006, singer Vic and his younger brother Mike Fuentes formed the band Pierce the Veil. Unable to find new musicians, they began writing material for their debut album on their own. They received support from friends Dave Yaden and Curtis Peoples.

In December 2006, Before Today changed their name to Pierce the Veil, and that they had posted a few songs on their Myspace account.

The duo went into the studio with producer Casey Bates in early 2007 and recorded the album within a few weeks. The recordings took place at Johnny Cab Studios and The Tank Studio, both located in Seattle, Washington. The album was released worldwide on June 26, 2007, by Equal Vision Records, which signed the group in May 2007.

It was produced by Casey Bates, along with Vic Fuentes, and was recorded with only the Fuentes brothers taking up all instrument duties.

== Release ==
On May 3, 2007, it was announced that the band had signed to Equal Vision. A week later, the album's artwork and track listing was revealed. In early May, the band toured with Poison the Well, before touring with Portugal. The Man in mid May. Throughout the rest of May, and running into early June, the band toured with Alesana. A music video for "Currents Convulsive" was released on June 19. The album was released by Equal Vision on June 26. (Note: U.S. Equal Vision EVR132) From late July to mid September, the band supported Scary Kids Scaring Kids and Boys Night Out on their co-headlining U.S. tour. In September and October, the band supported Chiodos on their I'm a Mathlete, Not an Athlete tour. In November and December, the band supported From First to Last on their headlining US tour.

The band supported Emery for their tour national tour around the U.S. from January 29 to March 22, 2008. In April, the band appeared at the Bamboozle Left festival. On May 2, a music video for "Yeah Boy and Doll Face" premiered on Fuse. The video was directed by Nate Weaver in Los Angeles. Between June and August, the band performed on the 2008 edition of Warped Tour. In October and November, the band went on a headlining US tour with support from Breathe Carolina, Four Letter Lie, and Emarosa. Between mid-February and early April 2009, the band participated in the 2009 edition of Taste of Chaos tours. A music video for "Chemical Kids and Mechanical Brides" was released on April 13.

== Reception ==
A Flair for the Dramatic charted at number 61 on the Heatseekers charts in the U.S.

== Track listing ==
All songs written by Vic Fuentes and Mike, except where noted.

No.	Title	Writer(s)	Length
1.	"Chemical Kids and Mechanical Brides"		3:41
2.	"Currents Convulsive"		3:36
3.	"Yeah Boy and Doll Face"		4:24
4.	"I'd Rather Die Than Be Famous"		2:54
5.	"The Cheap Bouquet"		3:49
6.	"Falling Asleep on a Stranger"	V. Fuentes, M. Fuentes, Curtis Peoples	3:44
7.	"She Sings in the Morning"		2:59
8.	"The Balcony Scene"	V. Fuentes, M. Fuentes, Peoples, David Yaden	3:19
9.	"Drella"		2:57
10.	"Diamonds and Why Men Buy Them"	V. Fuentes, M. Fuentes, Peoples	3:31
11.	"Wonderless"		5:41
Total length:			40:35

iTunes edition bonus track
No.	Title	Writer(s)	Length
12.	"Beat It" (Michael Jackson cover)	Michael Jackson	3:39

10th anniversary vinyl edition (Note: Tracks 12–14 only available digitally. The vinyl was sold with a digital download coupon for the tracks.)
No.	Title	Length
12.	"She Sings in the Morning" (Demo)
13.	"The Balcony Scene" (Demo)
14.	"Diamonds and Why Men Buy Them" (Demo)

== Personnel ==
Credits are adapted from the liner notes of A Flair for the Dramatic.

=== Pierce the Veil ===
- Vic Fuentes – lead vocals, guitars, bass, keyboards, synthesizers, programming, piano; production, mixing, art direction
- Mike Fuentes – drums, percussion, programming, backing vocals

=== Production ===
- Casey Bates – production, mixing, sound engineer
- Nick Johnson – sound engineer
- Dave Yaden – additional keyboards
- Kevin Knight – photography
- Jerad Knudson – photography
- Don Clark for Invisible Creature – design

== Chart positions ==
Chart (2007)	Peak position
U.S. Billboard Heatseekers Albums	61
