= Mike Fuentes (drummer) =

American drummer (born 1984)

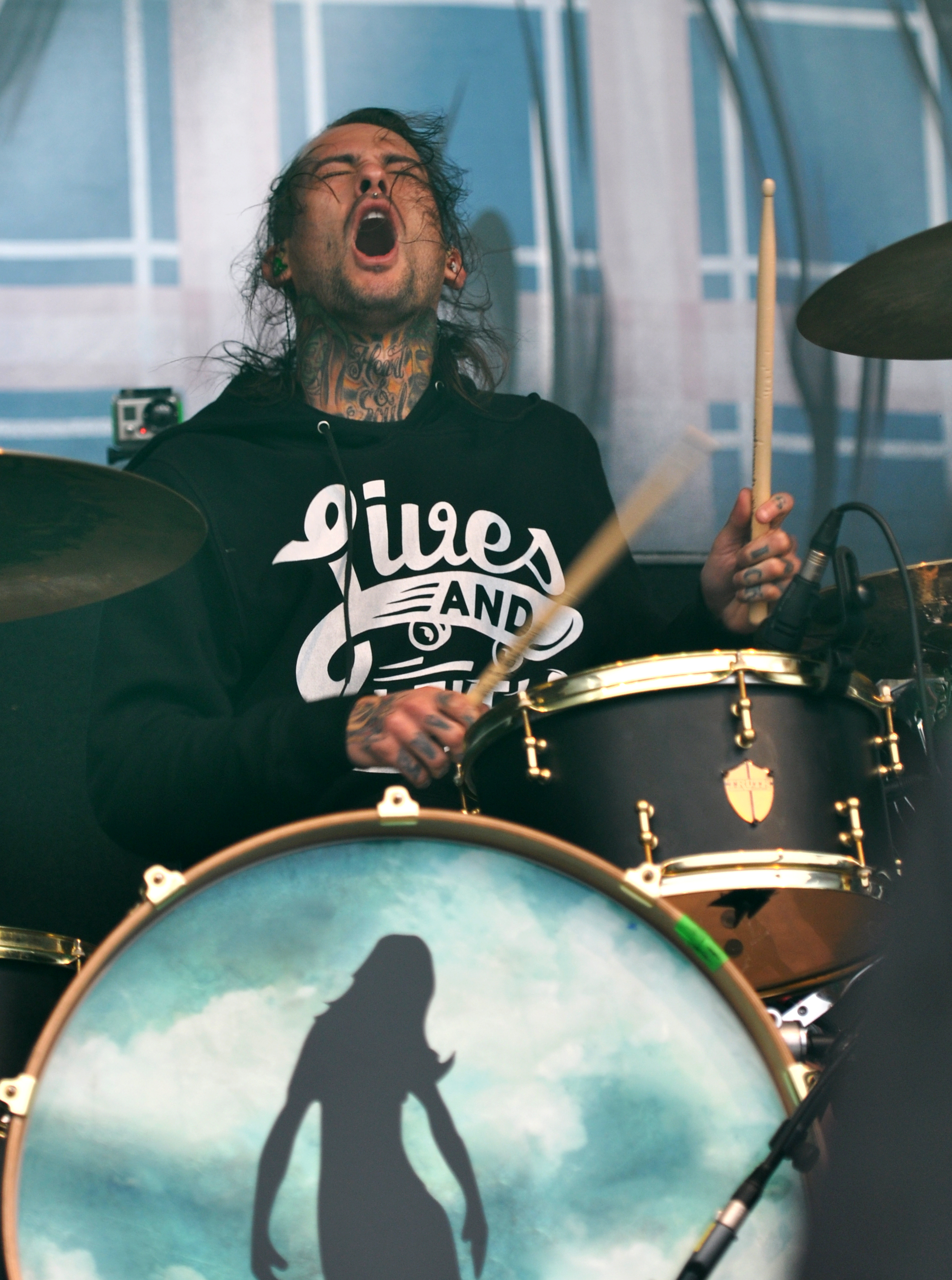
- Fuentes with Pierce the Veil at Rock am Ring 2013

Background information
- Also known as: MikeyWhiskeyHands
- Born: Michael Christopher Fuentes; December 14, 1984 (age 41)
- Origin: San Diego, California, U.S.
- Genres: Post-hardcore; hip-hop; emo; pop punk; experimental rock
- Occupation: Musician
- Instrument: Drums
- Years active: 1998–2017, 2020
- Formerly of: Pierce the Veil; Isles & Glaciers; Underminded; Before Today

Michael Christopher Fuentes (born December 14, 1984) is an American musician, best known as the former drummer for the post-hardcore band Pierce the Veil from San Diego, which he co-founded alongside his older brother Vic Fuentes in 2006.

Fuentes was the percussionist of the supergroup Isles & Glaciers. He also began a hip-hop solo project under the stage name MikeyWhiskeyHands in which he raps on instrumentals produced by Pierce the Veil's bassist Jaime Preciado. Fuentes signed to Velocity Records in March 2012.

== Personal life ==
Both Fuentes brothers attended Mission Bay Senior High School in San Diego. Mike graduated with the Class of 2003, where he was also voted "Most Likely To Be Famous" in the yearbook that year.

=== Sexual misconduct allegations ===
In mid-November 2017, Mike Fuentes was accused of statutory rape and soliciting nude photos via AOL by a minor over several years roughly a decade prior; the pair initiated contact on social media before meeting for the first time at a club in Anaheim, California when Fuentes was 24 and the girl was a minor of 16. The girl said that they had sex after meeting again at a later concert performance. She admitted to hiding her real age from him in her allegations. The alleged relationship lasted until she became an adult, turning 18. A second woman has accused him of sexual misconduct, specifically for requesting nude pictures from her when she was 15.

The band replied to the accusations in mid December. On December 16, 2017, Mike responded to the allegations and said that he was taking a break from Pierce the Veil. Vic Fuentes later clarified that Mike had not been part of the band since 2017, and that he would not be featured on their next album.

== Discography ==
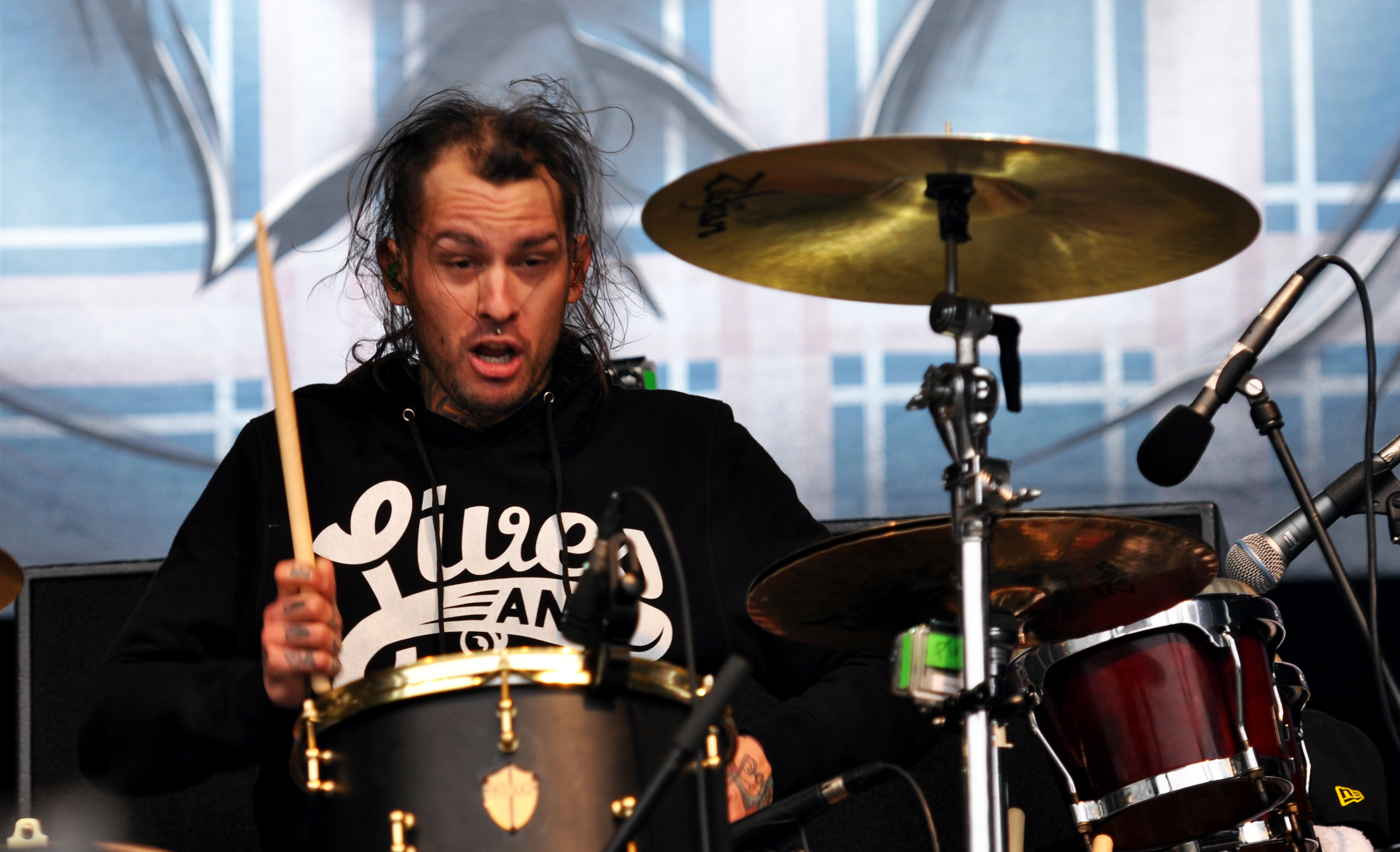
Fuentes performing in 2013

=== Before Today ===
- A Celebration of an Ending (2004)

=== Pierce the Veil ===
- A Flair for the Dramatic (2007)
- Selfish Machines (2010)
- Collide with the Sky (2012)
- Misadventures (2016)

=== Isles and Glaciers ===
- The Hearts of Lonely People EP (2010)

=== as MikeyWhiskeyHands ===
Singles

- "Money Matrz, Bitches Don't"
- "Straight Golden" with "The Saintz"
- "Tonight (Living the Life)"
- "Party with the Band"
- "This Ain't a Game" (featuring Jonny Craig (credited as Dr. Craig))
- "$ex, Drugz and WhiskeyHands" (featuring Jonny Craig (credited as Dr. Craig) & Jaime Preciado (credited as The Architechhh))
- "Get Your Mind Right"
