= Collide with the Sky =

Studio album by Pierce the Veil
- Released: July 17, 2012
- Recorded: February–April 2012
- Studios: House of Loud, Elmwood Park, New Jersey
- Genres: Post-hardcore; pop-punk; screamo; emo
- Length: 46:06
- Label: Fearless
- Producers: Dan Korneff; Kato Khandwala

Pierce the Veil chronology
Selfish Machines (2010)	Collide with the Sky (2012)	Misadventures (2016)

Singles from Collide with the Sky
- 1. "King for a Day" Released: June 5, 2012; 2. "Bulls in the Bronx" Released: June 26, 2012; 3. "Hell Above" Released: December 21, 2012

Collide with the Sky is the third studio album by American post-hardcore band Pierce the Veil, released on July 17, 2012, by Fearless Records. The album spawned the hit songs "King for a Day", "A Match into Water", "Bulls in the Bronx" and "Hell Above", all of which remain staples of the group's discography.

== Composition ==
According to frontman/rhythm guitarist Vic Fuentes, "King for a Day" is about "standing up to the people who think they are better than you, or try to take advantage of you." He added that he "felt like I wasn't cool enough, or good enough, for some people. It's a very angry song in retaliation to these bottled-up thoughts and emotions".

== Album art ==
Talking about the album's art, Fuentes has said, "The theme to the album artwork is 'jumping off of the ground that is breaking beneath you.' The idea is to inspire hope amongst the chaos that may be happening around you. If the ground was breaking beneath your feet, your first reaction may be to run and jump to safety, and it's that moment where you are suspended in the air that I am focusing on. A still frame where you're not sure if the person is falling or flying. It's about freeing yourself from the things that are breaking or falling apart in your life, and inspiring a sense of hope from the desperation."

== Release ==
Collide with the Sky is the band's first release on Fearless Records, as their previous two albums were released on Equal Vision Records. It was made available for pre-order through Merchnow on June 6, 2012. The band touring as part of the 2012 Warped Tour throughout July and August The album's first single, "King for a Day", was released on June 5, 2012. It features Kellin Quinn of Sleeping with Sirens as a guest vocalist. "Bulls in the Bronx" was chosen as the second single and released on June 26, 2012. On August 6, the band released a music video for "King for a Day". The video features the band "taking down the bad guy and getting back at him for treating us poorly", according to Fuentes. Preciado came up with this idea "because he'd always wanted to do a 'heist'."

They went on their first ever headlining UK tour in September. In October and November, the band went on the headlining Collide with the Sky Tour in the US with support from Sleeping with Sirens, Tonight Alive and Hands Like Houses. On December 21, "Hell Above" was released as a single, along with a live music video. In February and March 2013, the band performed at Soundwave festival in Australia. In April and May, the band went on the Spring Fever tour, a co-headlining North America tour with All Time Low, with support from Mayday Parade and You Me at Six. In September and October, the band supported A Day to Remember on the House Party tour in the US.

== Reception ==
Professional ratings
Review scores
Source	Rating
Sputnikmusic	2.5/5 stars
Big Cheese	3/5 stars
Rocksound	7/10 stars
Rockfreaks.net	7.5/10 stars
Kerrang!	KKKK

The album entered the U.S. Billboard 200 at number 12, selling over 27,000 copies in its debut week. The album has sold over 120,000 copies as of May 2013. As of March 2016, the album has sold nearly 350,000 copies. In October 2016, the album was certified gold by the Recording Industry Association of America (RIAA) for combined sales and album-equivalent units of over 500,000 units.

The album has been received well by critics. Alternative Press rated the album 4/5 stars saying "Collide with the Sky is PTV's best work to date". They praised the album for the power pop hooks on "Props & Mayhem", saying that you should download "Tangled in the Great Escape". AbsolutePunk commented that the album is "sure to continue Pierce the Veil's steady ascent to the top of their league", concluding that "[it] proves Pierce the Veil are seemingly still one step ahead of everyone else when it comes to concocting energetic slices of post-hardcore and that they won't be dropping the ball any time soon."

== Track listing ==
All songs written by Vic and Mike Fuentes, except where noted.

No.	Title	Writer(s)	Length
1.	"May These Noises Startle You in Your Sleep Tonight"		1:22
2.	"Hell Above"		3:43
3.	"A Match into Water"		3:33
4.	"King for a Day" (featuring Kellin Quinn of Sleeping with Sirens)		3:57
5.	"Bulls in the Bronx"	V. Fuentes, M. Fuentes, Jaime Preciado, Tony Perry	4:28
6.	"Props & Mayhem"		3:38
7.	"Tangled in the Great Escape" (featuring Jason Butler of Letlive.)		5:57
8.	"I'm Low on Gas and You Need a Jacket"		4:12
9.	"The First Punch"	V. Fuentes, M. Fuentes, Tom Denney	3:26
10.	"One Hundred Sleepless Nights"	V. Fuentes, M. Fuentes, Preciado, Perry	3:42
11.	"Stained Glass Eyes and Colorful Tears"		3:39
12.	"Hold on Till May" (featuring Lindsey Stamey of Oh No Fiasco)		4:39
Total length:			46:10

Bonus tracks

iTunes bonus track
No.	Title	Length
13.	"I'm Low on Gas and You Need a Jacket" (alternate version)	3:40

Amazon U.S. MP3 bonus track
No.	Title	Length
13.	"Hold on Till May" (acoustic version)	4:42

== Personnel ==
Personnel per digital booklet.

Pierce the Veil

- Vic Fuentes – lead vocals, rhythm guitar
- Tony Perry – lead guitar
- Jaime Preciado – bass guitar, backing vocals
- Mike Fuentes – drums

Additional musicians

- Kellin Quinn (Sleeping with Sirens) – vocals on "King for a Day"
- Jason Butler (letlive., Fever 333) – vocals on "Tangled in the Great Escape"
- Lindsey Stamey (Oh No Fiasco) – vocals on "Hold on Till May"
- Dave Yaden – piano, keyboards

Production

- Dan Korneff, Kato Khandwala – producers
- Dan Korneff – mixing
- Brian Robbins – additional engineer, digital editing
- John Bender – engineer
- Jim Romano – digital editing, assistant engineer
- Alex Prieto – digital editing, guitar tech
- Ted Jensen – mastering
- Aaron Marsh for Forefathers Group – cover illustration, layout design
- Daniel Danger – artwork concept

== Charts ==
=== Weekly charts ===
2012–2013 weekly chart performance
Chart (2012–2013)	Peak position
Australian Albums (ARIA)	81
UK Albums (Official Charts)	132
UK Independent Albums (Official Charts)	17
UK Rock & Metal Albums (Official Charts)	9
US Billboard 200	12
US Independent Albums (Billboard)	2
US Top Alternative Albums (Billboard)	1
US Top Hard Rock Albums (Billboard)	1
US Top Rock Albums (Billboard)	1

2026 weekly chart performance
Chart (2026)	Peak position
Scottish Albums (Official Charts)	76

=== Year-end charts ===
Year-end chart performance
Chart (2012)	Position
US Top Hard Rock Albums (Billboard)	30
Chart (2013)	Position
US Top Hard Rock Albums (Billboard)	42
Chart (2014)	Position
US Top Hard Rock Albums (Billboard)	31

== Certifications ==
Certifications
Region	Certification	Certified units/sales
United Kingdom (BPI)	Gold	100,000^{‡}
United States (RIAA)	Gold	500,000^{‡}
^{‡} Sales+streaming figures based on certification alone.

== Release history ==
Release dates and formats
Region	Date	Format	Edition	Label	Ref.
United Kingdom	July 16, 2012	CD	Standard	Fearless	
Various	July 17, 2012	CD; digital download; LP; streaming	Standard	Fearless	
Australasia	July 17, 2012	Digital download; streaming	Standard	Shock	
Various	July 17, 2012	Digital download; streaming	Bonus track	Fearless	
Japan	August 22, 2012	CD	Bonus track	Triple Vision	
United States	November 11, 2013	DVD; CD	This Is a Wasteland bundle	Fearless	
Various	November 25, 2013	DVD; CD	This Is a Wasteland bundle	Fearless	
