= Selfish Machines =

Studio album by Pierce the Veil
- Released: June 22, 2010
- Recorded: December 9, 2009 – February 25, 2010
- Studios: The Green Room (Hollywood, California); Ocean Studios (Burbank, California)
- Genres: Post-hardcore; pop-punk; experimental rock; emo; screamo
- Length: 47:06
- Label: Equal Vision
- Producers: Mike Green; Vic Fuentes

Pierce the Veil chronology
A Flair for the Dramatic (2007)	Selfish Machines (2010)	Collide with the Sky (2012)

Selfish Machines is the second studio album by American rock band Pierce the Veil, released by Equal Vision Records on June 22, 2010. Produced by Vic Fuentes and Mike Green, it was recorded in late 2009 and early 2010. Fuentes wrote most of the songs, and co-wrote three songs with former A Day to Remember guitarist Tom Denney.

A Day to Remember frontman Jeremy McKinnon was featured on the track "Caraphernelia", which had a music video released on September 28, 2010. "Bulletproof Love" was released as the follow-up music video on July 7, 2011. The album released to a mostly favorable critical reception, with reviewers praising the lyricism, instrumentation and experimental approach to its sound, while the use of Auto-Tune on some tracks was less favorably received, and Fuentes' vocals were met with a divisive response from some listeners. Nonetheless, it received moderate success and appeared on several US Billboard charts, including the Top Heatseekers and the top 200 charts. The album was reissued with remixed production, on September 24, 2013. It was certified Gold in the United States by the RIAA on June 13, 2025.

== Background and recording ==
In November 2008, Alternative Press posted a list detailing their most anticipated album releases for the following year. The list included Pierce the Veil's second album, which was listed for release in the Autumn. In an interview with AbsolutePunk in early 2009, guitarist and vocalist Vic Fuentes revealed that Pierce the Veil's next album would be influenced by their fans. Fuentes also said in the interview that he was uncertain when the album would be released, but that it would be released by Equal Vision. In April 2009, Alternative Press revealed that the band were in the process of writing for their next album. The band was writing and demoing new material at their home studio in November 2009. Selfish Machines, and the band's next album Collide with the Sky (2012), was written in a cabin that belonged to Fearless Records' president Bob Becker. Like their previous record, A Flair for the Dramatic (2007), singer-songwriter Curtis Peoples joined Pierce the Veil to help write songs. However, none of the songs made it to the final cut.

The album was recorded during December 2009 and January 2010 in Los Angeles with producer Mike Green, with a planned release later that year. Green was selected as the producer because, according to Fuentes, albums he had previously worked on "sounded amazing", and he was "a very down to earth and passionate person". It was revealed on December 27, 2009, that Mike Fuentes had recorded all the drum tracks in one day, at Ocean Studios in Burbank, California. The drums were recorded using three microphones on the kick drum, and four on the snare. During the recording sessions, Mike broke a microphone that was worth $6,000. By January 11, 2010, though vocals and keyboard tracks had yet to be recorded, all other components had been completed. A studio update posted on February 19 noted eights days remained to record the vocals. Fuentes later said he was not going to be recording in Los Angeles again, as being so close to their hometown of San Diego provided "a lot of distractions that we didn't need".

== Music and lyrics ==
The theme of this album talks about these natural thoughts and feelings to want and take–the desire to be in love and the desperation for someone else to love you.

— Vic Fuentes, on the album's overall lyrical content, 2010

The majority of the songs featured on Selfish Machines were written by Fuentes, apart from: "The Boy Who Could Fly", "Disasterology" and "The Sky Under the Sea" that were co-written with ex-A Day to Remember guitarist Tom Denney; and "Besitos" co-written with Dave Yaden. (Note: Fuentes and Denney would later collaborate on material for Pierce the Veil's fourth album.) An iTunes staff reviewer noted that it "blurs emo, prog rock, and post-hardcore" together, and Sebastian Berning of Powermetal noted the emo and post-hardcore sound also present on A Flair for the Dramatic in addition to many new stylistic influences. Sergio Pereira of MusicReview described the album as experimental rock, but stressed that it was not "your stereotypical experimental record". Prior to the album's release, Fuentes said fans should "expect a lot of songs to sing along to" and that their live performances would be "super fun".

The music for "Besitos" showcases the band's Latin influence, and the lyrics describe Fuentes' relationship with a girl, from her point of view, who he "couldn't stop hurting over and over again". "The Boy Who Could Fly" was originally six minutes long, but the intro was split off as a separate track, "Southern Constellations", because of its length. "Southern Constellations" is about Fuentes' fascination with Southern girls. He called the guitar tone "one of my favorite[s]" from the album. It was produced using a Stratocaster played through a custom-made amplifier resulting in the "glassy and unique sound we were looking for". "The Boy Who Could Fly" displayed the band's punk roots. It has a hastily played guitar "represent[ing] everything that we loved playing as kids'. The lyrics are about a relationship reliant on the other person with "obsession and desperation, and the stupid things you do when you're in love". The track is one of the more intense songs that Fuentes has written.

"Caraphernelia" was based on Fuentes' ex-girlfriend, who left her possessions at his house, causing him to think about her when he saw them. As soon as he started writing the music for the chorus, Fuentes knew he wanted A Day to Remember's vocalist Jeremy McKinnon to appear on the song, and asked him to sing several weeks later. McKinnon screamed the chorus and bridge sections, which made the collaboration "very special" to Fuentes. Fuentes called "Fast Times at Clairemont High" a "very selfish song", dealing "with human nature and our selfish tendencies," which included musical influences of Michael Jackson. "The New National Anthem" is about a night when Fuentes was visiting a girl and they were making out in the dark in her apartment. The intro was recorded at Fuentes' apartment and pieces of that recording were used throughout the album.

"Bulletproof Love" is a song based on Fuentes' interest in "happy songs that have morbid lyrics". He calls it "one of the darkest" he has written. Written in the style of suicide note that would be found by a loved one, the lyrics are about being passionate "with someone to the point where you're hurting yourself". "Stay Away from My Friends" is about an ex-girlfriend who was trying to be friends with Fuentes' friends, after the pair had broken-up. The song was written by Fuentes at his residence in San Diego, and the piano featured on it was played by his friend Dave Yaden. The song came about because the band wanted to "make it as different as possible from the rest" of the material, placing it in "the middle of the album as a sort of a breath of fresh air". Most of the lyrics for "I Don't Care If You're Contagious" were inspired by a female fan telling Fuentes that her boyfriend was involved in a fatal car crash. It was written "as a gift" to the fan, from the point of view of the boyfriend "speaking to her, telling her that he is still watching over her and that he will love her forever".

"Disasterology" is "a typical guy's dream" of girls, going out drinking and living the life somebody wants. The chorus was "a very philosophical idea that I've played around with for a long time", the creation of "something beautiful only to destroy it". Fuentes wrote "Million Dollar Houses (The Painter)" as "a gift to my parents". His father worked as a painting contractor throughout his life, barely earning enough money to keep the family going, and being forced to sell his home. Fuentes says the song "strongly express[es] my hatred for money and the way it sometimes fucks with people's lives and families". "The Sky Under the Sea" is about admitting one is selfish when it comes to "love and taking what you want without regret". The lyric "I introduce the selfish machine" is a reference to the animal instinct that everyone has and will not admit exists.

== Release and promotion ==
We are all in one way or another selfish machines In no way is this a negative thing, it's human nature. We all have natural tendencies to want, love, and take. It's about that 'evil' thing inside of us that is really not evil at all, it's just there and always will be inside all of us.

— Vic Fuentes, discussing the album's title, 2010

On April 29, 2010, Equal Vision announced Selfish Machines would be released in June. Before its release, "The Boy Who Could Fly" was available for streaming on the band's MySpace account, and for free download from their PureVolume account on May 10. On June 20, the album was made available for streaming through AOL Music. Selfish Machines was released two days later. (Note: U.S. Equal Vision EVR161) "She Makes Dirty Words Sound Pretty", a bonus track included with iTunes versions of the album, is a Vic Fuentes and Jonny Craig song recorded in 2007. A deluxe edition of the album included a bonus, "The Making Of" DVD. A few days after its release, the band went on the Warped Tour. The album was released in Australia on July 9, and in Japan on August 4; both editions contained exclusive bonus tracks.

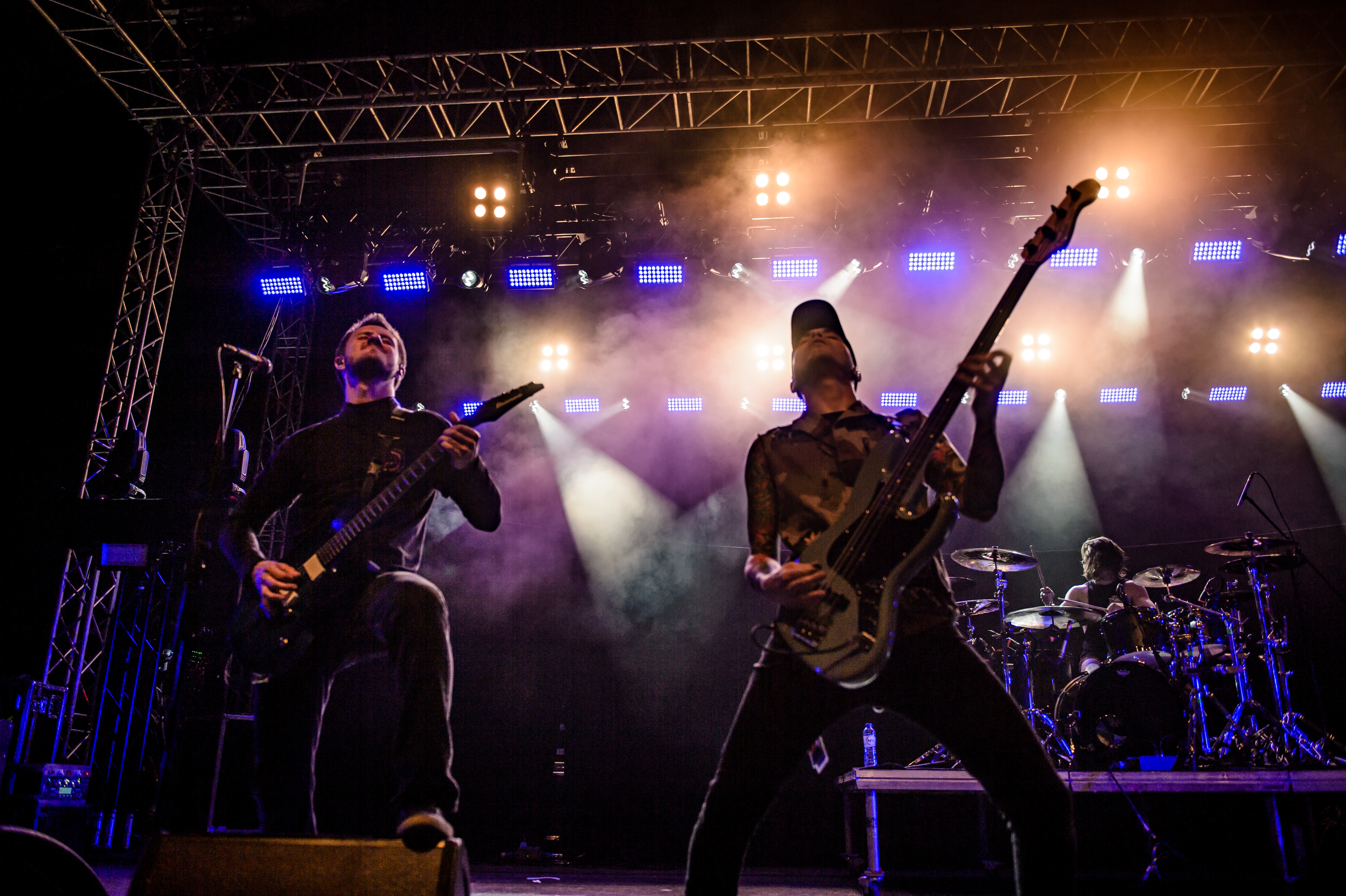
Among Pierce the Veil's promotional tours was a co-headlining tour with Miss May I (pictured).

From September 10 to 19, the band went on the Take Action Tour in Australia. On September 27, a music video for "Caraphernelia" was released. It was filmed in Los Angeles, and directed by Robby Starbuck, while the band was on the Warped Tour. Pierce the Veil was a supporting act on Attack Attack!'s This Is a Family Tour from November to December 2010, Silverstein's US tour in January 2011, and A Day to Remember and Bring Me the Horizon from March through April. A music video for "Bulletproof Love" was announced on June 28, and released on July 7. It had been filmed in May in Los Angeles with director Dan Dobi. A behind-the-scenes video was posted on July 27. In October 2011, the band joined Blessthefall and Motionless in White for a European tour, and from November through December 2011, the band co-headlined the No Guts, No Glory tour with Miss May I. A vinyl edition of the album, along with A Flair for the Dramatic, was released on May 24, 2013. (Note: U.S. Equal Vision 95406) A reissue of Selfish Machines was planned for release on September 17, with remixing done by Dan Korneff. It featured "Kissing in Cars", a song that was previously available as a bonus track on the original Japanese edition of the album. The reissue was actually released on September 24.

== Reception ==
Reviews of Selfish Machines were overall favorable, seeing it as a step in the right direction from their debut record, but the general consensus was that the band still needed to properly refine their sound and musical style, with certain elements coming in for criticism. Rock Sound's Amy Bangs favorably acknowledged the band's unique musical style, but notes that "Fast Times at Clairemont High ...sounds way too similar" to "Sunburn Versus the Rhinovirus" by The Matches, while feeling that the album's production "over-experimentation" with "particularly autotuned vocals" gives "the impression of something to hide". AbsolutePunk's Drew Beringer noted that, despite the opening four tracks that "hit you in the mouth", the band "lose their focus and get a bit indulgent". Beringer also mentions the auto-tune, saying that it "rears its ugly head" on "Million Dollar Houses (The Painter)". However, he commended the band for their willingness to experiment with new sounds. Emily Yeadon for Mind Equals Blown is another one to note the auto-tune, commenting that it was "a little unnecessary".

On the other hand, Sebastian Berning of Powermetal praised the band's new musical influences, saying it would help them gain new fans without losing old ones. A song that often came to his mind while listening to Selfish Machines was "The Bird and the Worm" (2007) by the Used. Sergio Pereira of MusicReview called the record atypical of the average experimental record; rather, it was "a carefully constructed album, which still contains many infectious vocal hooks and musical spots to please sing-along fans", highlighting "Bulletproof Love" as an example. However, Pereira also said that some listeners wouldn't enjoy Vic's voice, commenting, "I enjoy it, but I could understand if someone said he’s a bit too whiny or piercing."

== Track listing ==
All songs written by Vic Fuentes, except where noted. All lyrics by Vic Fuentes.

No.	Title	Writer(s)	Length
1.	"Besitos"	Vic Fuentes, Mike Fuentes, Dave Yaden	4:22
2.	"Southern Constellations"		1:05
3.	"The Boy Who Could Fly"	V. Fuentes, M. Fuentes, Tom Denney	5:08
4.	"Caraphernelia" (featuring Jeremy McKinnon)		4:28
5.	"Fast Times at Clairemont High"		4:01
6.	"The New National Anthem"		4:00
7.	"Bulletproof Love"		3:57
8.	"Stay Away from My Friends"		4:41
9.	"I Don't Care If You're Contagious"		3:24
10.	"Disasterology" (V. Fuentes, M. Fuentes, Denney)		3:26
11.	"Million Dollar Houses (The Painter)"		4:01
12.	"The Sky Under the Sea"	V. Fuentes, M. Fuentes, Denney	4:33
Total length:			47:06

Bonus tracks

iTunes bonus track
No.	Title	Length
13.	"She Makes Dirty Words Sound Pretty"	3:51

Japanese edition and 2013 reissue bonus track
No.	Title	Length
13.	"Kissing in Cars"	4:17

Australian edition (hidden tracks)
No.	Title	Length
13.	"Caraphernelia" (Acoustic)	3:37
14.	"Bulletproof Love" (Acoustic)	3:58

== Personnel ==
Personnel per digital booklet.

Pierce the Veil

- Vic Fuentes – vocals, rhythm guitar
- Tony Perry – lead guitar
- Jaime Preciado – bass
- Mike Fuentes – drums, percussion

Additional personnel

- Jeremy McKinnon – guest vocals on "Caraphernelia"
- Vanessa Harris – guest vocals on "Besitos" and "I Don't Care If You're Contagious"
- Mike Green – shredding chorus guitar riff on "Besitos"
- Johnny Meyer – pinch harmonic on "Besitos"

Production

- Mike Green – producer, engineer, mixing
- Vic Fuentes – co-producer
- Kyle Black, Vanessa Harris, Will McCoy – assistant engineers
- Alan Douches – mastering
- Phill Mamula – art direction, art concept, photography
- Bill Scoville – layout
- Kyle Crawford – logo
- Chris Laughter – documentary
- Dan Korneff – mixing (2013 reissue)

== Charts ==
2010 chart performance
Chart (2010)	Peak position
US Billboard 200	106
US Heatseekers Albums (Billboard)	1
US Independent Albums (Billboard)	16
US Top Alternative Albums (Billboard)	17
US Top Hard Rock Albums (Billboard)	9
US Top Rock Albums (Billboard)	31

2026 chart performance
Chart (2026)	Peak position
UK Independent Albums (Official Charts)	46
UK Rock & Metal Albums (Official Charts)	22

== Certifications ==
Certifications
Region	Certification	Certified units/sales
United States (RIAA)	Gold	500,000^{‡}
^{‡} Sales+streaming figures based on certification alone.
