= Chiodos discography =

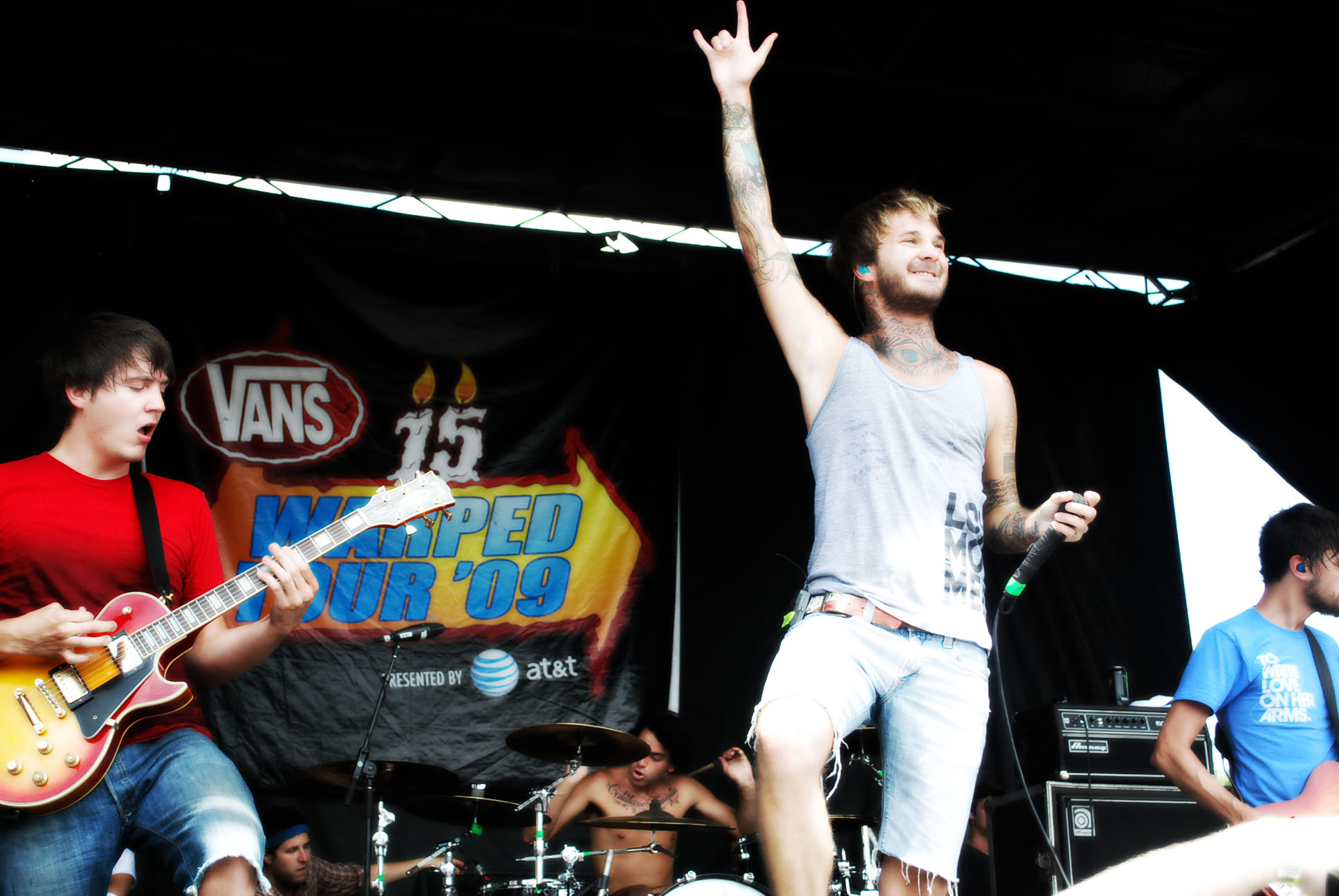
- Chiodos on Warped Tour in 2009
- Studio albums: 4
- Extended plays: 3
- Singles: 9
- Music videos: 9

Chiodos is an American post-hardcore band, formed in Davison, Michigan, in 2001. The group has released four studio albums, three extended plays, eight singles, eight music videos.

== Albums ==
=== Studio albums ===
Year	Album details	Peak chart positions						
Year	Album details	US	US Alt	US Digital	US Hard Rock	US Heat	US Indie	US Rock
2005	All's Well That Ends Well: Released: July 26, 2005; Label: Equal Vision; Format: CD, digital download	164	—	—	—	3	11	—
2007	Bone Palace Ballet: Released: September 4, 2007; Label: Equal Vision, Warner Bros.; Format: CD, digital download	5	1	5	1	—	1	1
2010	Illuminaudio: Released: October 5, 2010; Label: Equal Vision; Format: CD, digital download	37	5	—	4	—	5	11
2014	Devil: Released: April 1, 2014; Label: Razor & Tie; Format: CD, vinyl, digital download	12	3	12	2	—	—	3

=== Extended plays ===
Year	Album details
2001	The Chiodos Brothers: Released: 2001; Label: Self-released; Format: CD, digital download
2002	The Best Way to Ruin Your Life: Released: June 2002; Label: Self-released; Format: CD, digital download
2003	The Heartless Control Everything: Released: January 25, 2003; Label: Search and Rescue; Format: CD, digital download

=== Featured albums ===
Year	Album details
2006	Warped Tour 2006 Tour Compilation: Released: June 6, 2006; Label: SideOneDummy; Format: CD, digital download
2007	Warped Tour 2007 Tour Compilation: Released: June 5, 2007; Label: SideOneDummy; Format: CD, digital download
2009	Punk Goes Pop 2: Released: March 10, 2009; Label: Fearless Records; Format: CD, digital download
2009	Warped Tour 2009 Tour Compilation: Released: June 9, 2009; Label: SideOneDummy; Format: CD, digital download

== Singles ==
Year	Single	Certifications	Album
2005	"All Nereids Beware"		All's Well That Ends Well
2005	"One Day Women Will All Become Monsters"		All's Well That Ends Well
2006	"Baby, You Wouldn't Last a Minute on the Creek"	RIAA: Gold	All's Well That Ends Well
2007	"The Words 'Best Friend' Become Redefined"		All's Well That Ends Well
2008	"Lexington. (Joey Pea-Pot with a Monkey Face)"		Bone Palace Ballet
2008	"The Undertaker's Thirst for Revenge Is Unquenchable (The Final Battle)"		Bone Palace Ballet
2010	"Caves"		Illuminaudio
2010	"Notes in Constellations"		Illuminaudio
2014	"Ole Fishlips Is Dead Now"		Devil
2014	"3 AM"		Devil
2014	"R2me2"/"Let Me Get You a Towel"		Devil (Japanese edition)
2026	"Tapdat"		N/A

== Music videos ==
Year	Title	Director
2005	"All Nereids Beware"	Andy DeYoung
2006	"One Day Women Will All Become Monsters"	Michael Grodner
2006	"Baby, You Wouldn't Last a Minute on the Creek"	Popcore Films
2006	"The Words 'Best Friend' Become Redefined"	Pat Franchot
2008	"Lexington. (Joey Pea-Pot with a Monkey Face)"	Josh Graham
2008	"The Undertaker's Thirst for Revenge Is Unquenchable (The Final Battle)"	Darren Doane
2010	"Caves"	John Stephens
2011	"Notes in Constellations"	John Stephens, Ryan Southwell
2014	"Ole Fishlips Is Dead Now"	
2014	"3 AM"	Ramon Boutviseth
