= Illuminaudio =

Studio album by Chiodos
- Released: October 5, 2010
- Recorded: May 2009 – August 2010, at The Machine Shop, Weehawken, New Jersey / Nut House Studio, Hoboken, New Jersey
- Genres: Post-hardcore; space rock; alternative rock; emo; progressive rock
- Length: 47:00
- Label: Equal Vision
- Producer: Machine

Chiodos chronology
Bone Palace Ballet (2007)	Illuminaudio (2010)	Devil (2014)

Professional ratings
Review scores
Source	Rating
AbsolutePunk	(89%)
AllMusic	3/5 stars
BLARE	3.5/5 stars
Double Dance	4/5 stars

Illuminaudio is the third studio album by American post-hardcore band Chiodos. It was released on October 5, 2010 through Equal Vision Records. Illuminaudio is the first and only studio album from the band with vocalist Brandon Bolmer, formerly of Yesterdays Rising, after the departure of Craig Owens. Owens would return to the band in 2012, replacing Bolmer. This is also the first and only album with drummer Tanner Wayne, formerly of Underminded. He would leave the band in 2012, to be replaced by former drummer Derrick Frost. This is also the last album with original guitarist Jason Hale. He would leave the band in 2012 to be replaced by The Fall of Troy's guitarist and vocalist Thomas Erak. As of March 2014, the album has sold 49,000 copies in the United States.

== Track listing ==
No.	Title	Length
1.	"Illuminaudio"	1:45
2.	"Caves"	3:40
3.	"Love Is a Cat from Hell" (featuring Vic Fuentes of Pierce the Veil)	4:16
4.	"Modern Wolf Hair"	3:49
5.	"Notes in Constellations"	4:22
6.	"Scaremonger"	4:09
7.	"His Story Repeats Itself"	3:53
8.	"Let Us Burn One"	3:57
9.	"Hey Zeus! The Dungeon"	4:24
10.	"Stratovolcano Mouth"	4:22
11.	"Those Who Slay Together, Stay Together"	5:05
12.	"Closed Eyes Still Look Forward"	3:28
Total length:		47:00

Australian Bonus Track
No.	Title	Length
13.	"New Thought Movement"	4:23
Total length:		51:23

== Allusions ==
- The song "Stratovolcano Mouth" borrows some elements from the song "Thermacare," aka "The Only Thing You Talk About," a demo done with Craig Owens in late 2009, which leaked in August 2010 and turned into a song by his new band D.R.U.G.S.
- The song "Hey Zeus! The Dungeon" has lyrics that detail story elements of The Phantom of the Opera.
- The song entitled "Love Is a Cat from Hell" is in reference to Bukowski's collection of poems entitled "Love Is a Dog from Hell".
- The song "Modern Wolf Hair" is a play on the expression "modern warfare."
- The song "Those Who Slay Together, Stay Together" references the title of the Venture Bros' season 3 finale episodes: The Family That Slays Together, Stays Together (Part I) and The Family That Slays Together, Stays Together (Part II).

== Personnel ==
=== Musicians ===
Credits for Illuminaudio adapted from AllMusic.

Chiodos

- Brandon Bolmer – lead vocals
- Bradley Bell – keyboards, piano, synthesizers, programming
- Jason Hale – lead guitar
- Pat McManaman – rhythm guitar
- Matt Goddard – bass guitar
- Tanner Wayne – drums, percussion

Guest musicians

- Vic Fuentes – additional vocals on track 3

Production

- Produced and mixed by Machine
- Engineered by Will Putney and Jeremy Comitas
- Mastered by Scott Hull
- Additional programming and sound design by Christopher «Notes» Olsen
- Editing by Bill Purcell and Jay Sayong
- A&R by D. Sandshaw
- Artwork by Kyle Crawford
- Photography by Tim Harmon

== Charts ==
Album

Year	Chart	Position
2010	U.S. Billboard Top 200	37
2010	Independent Albums	5
2010	Top Rock Albums	11
2010	Top Alternative Albums	5
