= With Love (Craig Owens album) =

EP by Craig Owens
- Released: September 15, 2009
- Recorded: 2009 at 37 Studios, Rochester Hills, MI
- Genre: Indie rock, pop rock
- Length: 21:35
- Label: Equal Vision
- Producer: Craig Owens, Brian Southall, Matt Dalton

Με την αγάπη (With Love) is the debut EP by Craig Owens, vocalist for Chiodos and Cinematic Sunrise. It was released September 15, 2009, via Equal Vision Records.

In December 2008, Craig Owens posted a cover of the Counting Crows song "Anna Begins" for download on his website iamcraigowens.com, as well as a demo of Edgar Allan Poe's 'El Dorado'.

Owens announced the name of his new solo EP via Twitter, "Με την αγάπη" which is, loosely translated, Greek for "with love" and is pronounced "meh teen ah-ga-pee" in English. On July 21, 2009, Craig Owens announced on Twitter that he will be releasing the EP on September 15, 2009.

== Track listing ==
No.	Title	Length
1.	"Cardigans and Swing Sets"	2:17
2.	"Products of Poverty" (featuring Stephen Christian from Anberlin)	3:42
3.	"My Love"	3:56
4.	"A Poem By Adam Wolfson"	0:51
5.	"Big Apple Big Heart"	3:53
6.	"All Based on a Storyline"	3:25
7.	"First One, I Love You So Much More" (taken from the AP Acoustic Sessions)	3:31
Total length:		21:35

== Personnel ==
- Craig Owens - lead and backing vocals, piano, acoustic guitars
- Brian Southall - electric, acoustic, bass guitars, drums, programming, percussion and backing vocals
- Stephen Christian - vocals on "Products of Poverty"
