= Active disassembly =

Active Disassembly (AD) is a developing technology which is associated with the term active disassembly using smart materials (ADSM).

== Outline ==
Smart materials such as shape memory alloys (SMA) are now offering the possibility of allowing complex items to be disassembled easily and in a potentially cost-effective manner. Other smart materials employed by AD include, shape memory polymers (SMP), smart layers, sprays, engineering polymers etc. The development of this technology could make recycling of consumer products more common and thus serve to be environmentally friendly.

== Eco-design and legislative background ==
Companies designing and manufacturing a range of consumer goods are becoming increasingly subject to legislative and other pressures requiring them to consider the "End of Life" (EoL) implications of their products. The ELV (End of Life Vehicle) Directive in Europe, for example, states that the current reuse and recycling level of 75% (by weight) has to be raised to 85% by 2015. The WEEE (Waste Electrical and Electronic Equipment) Directive is aimed at the eradication of landfill as a means of disposing of hazardous materials such as arsenic in LEDs. Manufacturers are also required to build strategies for disassembly into the design of their products. In the past designing products such as cars rarely involved consideration of what would happen when they were scrapped, although some companies, such as BMW have been pro-active in this respect.

== Research ==
Dr. Chiodo is the inventor of AD and ADSM technology. He focused his research on thermally triggered disassembly using shape memory materials. His work first started in recycling related design solutions since the late 1980s. In 1991, his MA thesis investigated Design for Disassembly providing incentive for a new automated approach to what was at the time, a cumbersome endeavour. He conducted experiments including crude force methods to highly tuned approaches such as temperature, electrical resistance, vibration, volume, explosive, chemical, induction and bio triggered disassembly techniques.

Since then, this work has expanded to a variety of dematerialization technology including expanded triggering mechanisms, varied hierarchical control parameters, increased temperature allowances among other considerations including the aforementioned. Dr. Chiodo invented hundreds of AD, ADSM and other automated technology mechanisms since his initial inventions in 1996. His recent work includes specific component isolation and clean segregation of specific elements for re-use including LCDs. In 1996, he conducted disassembly and shape memory experiments using typical engineering polymers such as PEEK, ABS, PC, Nylon and others; manipulating their shape memory properties for potentially more cost-effective active disassembly alternatives. This work has been re-addressed by H. Hussein, Dr. Mark Allen and Dr. David Harrison in a paper published in 2009 with results from collaborative work between Dr. Chiodo, Motorola, Nokia, Sony, Gaiker, Indumetal, IKP etc. but has so far produced only pre-competitive results.

From 1996, this field has gained an increased popularity by industry which has led to more extensive research. Dr. Nick Jones has conducted work on ELVs among a variety of other novel approaches to AD using electrically triggered SMA mechanisms. Dr. Jones and Dr. Chiodo have recently developed a SMA NiTi releasing mechanism for LCD panels. These are for clean and non-destructive dismantling of macro assemblies' of desktop and laptop displays. It consists of an automated electrically triggered fine wire that lies dormant until triggered at EoL.

Dr. Jones has developed a group of applications for the ELV market. These include SMA devices for airbags, SMP devices for glass removal and a novel velcro releasing mechanism.

Dr. Neubert explored the field of active disassembly further by looking at other trigger methods to initiate disassembly. His conceptual ideas to use the volume increase of frozen water to disconnect certain parts of a product or to use soluble fasteners, are described in his dissertation published in 2000.

Barbara Willems elaborated on this research by focusing on the "pressure cells" described by Neubert. She developed a mathematical model to determine the optimal shape and dimensions of a pressure-activated fastener. Implemented in a product, these snap-fit-like fasteners enable dismantling through variations in ambient pressure. Since pressure variations are very unlikely to occur during the normal life-time of an electrical product, this trigger mechanism offers a more secure way of disassembly compared to temperature based triggering.

Award-winning research in the 2013 Journal, Assembly Automation:, a world survey of smart materials used in active disassembly was conducted in 2012. This work was done by Dr. Chiodo and Dr. Jones. This is currently noted in the 'Active Disassembly Blog'.

Dr. Chiodo's work continues to investigate AD employing materials 'made smart'. Some applications include interstitial layers, modular mechanisms, disassembly functions and other DfX eco-design strategies. Some of this work is described in the circular economy area, see the Circular Economy and original posting at Ellen MacAurther Foundation website.

In Japan, U.S.A. and EU, various research departments in universities have investigated various strands of the technology. While there remains to be any mass-produced and implemented applications of the technology in industry, work continues to this end.

== Re-manufacturing research with AD ==
Dr. Ijomah has been investigating the application of AD technology applying it to the re-manufacturing of electronic products. To date, the work has been conducted with Dr. Chiodo with some papers on the topic in various journals.

== Advantages of AD ==
Most consumer products consist of a large number of parts and a wide range of materials. Disassembly at the end of a product's useful life is an inevitably complex and time-consuming operation to ensure effective separation of all component parts for subsequent re-use or recycling. AD techniques permit the automation or semi-automation of this process and thus make it more viable. The incorporation of AD and the implications of companies taking responsibility for the end of life recycling of their products will have long term cost implications for the consumer.

== Hurdles of AD ==
There are currently significant obstacles preventing this technology to succeeding in the mass market. (cost, re-training, fin-cap/law-cap, arbitrage, legislative practice....to be continued.

== The use of smart materials ==
A wide range of methods are being developed for use in AD. These methods generally require the use of smart materials which respond to a stimulus in order to change shape or size and thus facilitate the release of parts. The materials involved include shape memory polymers (SMP) and shape memory alloys (SMA). These materials offer significant shape changes at a range of transition temperatures, which are achieved by methods involving infrared, microwave, supercooling, chemicals and direct heat. The range of "trigger temperatures" for various smart materials means that it is possible to place the products in a heated environment where the outer elements become detached and then move on to a higher temperature zone where internal parts and sub-assemblies are dismantled.

Recently, other materials employed for AD, by Dr. Chiodo, have been further investigated from their initial work started in 1996. The repertoire of 'smart materials' and other approaches continues to expand.

== Examples of AD fittings ==
Screws, rivets, ribbons, bars and clips, specially designed to facilitate AD, can be manufactured from smart materials such as SMAs and SMPs. These will trigger at a pre-determined temperature, depending on the specific application.
