= Destroy Rebuild =

Studio album by Destroy Rebuild Until God Shows
- Released: June 17, 2022
- Studio: West Valley Recording Studios, Woodland Hills, California; Sparky Dark Studios, Calabasas, California
- Genre: Post-hardcore; alternative rock
- Length: 38:09
- Label: Velocity; Equal Vision
- Producer: Howard Benson

Destroy Rebuild Until God Shows chronology
D.R.U.G.S. (2011)	Destroy Rebuild (2022)	Until God Shows (2024)

Singles from Destroy Rebuild
- 1. "Destiny" Released: February 2, 2022; 2. "Satellites in Motion" Released: March 10, 2022; 3. "Brighter Side" Released: April 20, 2022; 4. "Outcasts vs. Everyone" Released: May 11, 2022; 5. "Gold" Released: June 15, 2022

Professional ratings
Review scores
Source	Rating
Blabbermouth.net	9/10
Punktastic	Not rated
Wall of Sound	6/10

Destroy Rebuild is the second studio album by American post-hardcore project Destroy Rebuild Until God Shows, and the first released as a solo project. The album was released on June 17, 2022, through Velocity and Equal Vision Records.

== Background ==
On April 26, 2012, it was announced that vocalist Craig Owens had rejoined Chiodos, with the other members of Destroy Rebuild Until God Shows departing the band at the same, with the band effectively breaking up.

In February 2020, an Instagram account was made for the band, hinting at a possible reunion. The reunion was confirmed the following month with the release of the single "King I Am", with Owens being the only returning member. The band was signed to Velocity Records in February 2021. On September 8, 2021, Owens announced that Jona Weinhofen had joined as a touring guitarist. Former All That Remains bassist and backing vocalist Aaron Patrick was announced as another touring member on December 15.

On February 2, 2022, the band released a new single, "Destiny", and announced a new album would be released later in the year. On March 10, the band released the single "Satellites in Motion" and revealed the album would be titled Destroy Rebuild to be released that June. The album's third single, "Brighter Side", was released on April 20. Another touring member, drummer Aaron Stechauner, was revealed two days later on April 22. "Outcasts vs. Everyone", featuring Brennan Savage, was released as the album's fourth single on May 11. The album's fifth and final single, "Gold", was released on June 15.

== Track listing ==
No.	Title	Writer(s)	Length
1.	"Destiny"	Craig Owens, Mitchell Rogers	3:32
2.	"Satellites in Motion"	Owens, Rogers, Sal Torres	2:46
3.	"Gold"	Owens, Rogers, Aaron Jerome, Charity Vance, Matt Guadiano	3:08
4.	"Brighter Side"	Owens, Rogers, Erik Ron	2:52
5.	"Outcasts vs. Everyone" (feat. Brennan Savage)	Owens, Rogers, Ron, Brennan Savage	3:45
6.	"Supercalifragilisticexistentialcrisis"	Owens, Rogers	2:59
7.	"The Longest Road"	Owens, Rogers, Ron, Jona Weinhofen	3:25
8.	"(Are We Not Drawn Onward To) New Era"	Owens, Rogers, Torres	2:48
9.	"What's the Code for Heaven's Gate?"	Owens, Rogers	3:02
10.	"Gravity (My Ever Ghost)"	Owens, Rogers, Weinhofen	2:52
11.	"Waiting On You"	Owens, Rogers	2:57
12.	"The Arm"	Owens, Rogers	3:56

== Personnel ==
Destroy Rebuild Until God Shows

- Craig Owens – vocals, programming

Additional

- Mitchell Rogers – guitar, bass, programming
- Jona Weinhofen – guitar on tracks 1, 7, and 10
- Carlos Cruz – drums
- Howard Benson – producer, mixing, additional keyboards
- Brennan Savage – additional vocals on track 5
- Paul Romano – art direction, artwork, design
