= Chiodi =

Chiodi is an Italian surname. Notable people with the surname include:

- Alessio Chiodi (born 1973), Italian motorcycle racer
- Giovanni Chiodi (born 1961), Italian politician
- Pietro Chiodi (1915–1970), Italian philosopher and anti-fascist partisan
- Ron Chiodi (born 1974), American snowboarder
- Stefano Chiodi (1956–2009), Italian footballer

== See also ==
- Chiodo
