= Tanner Wayne =

American drummer (born 1988)

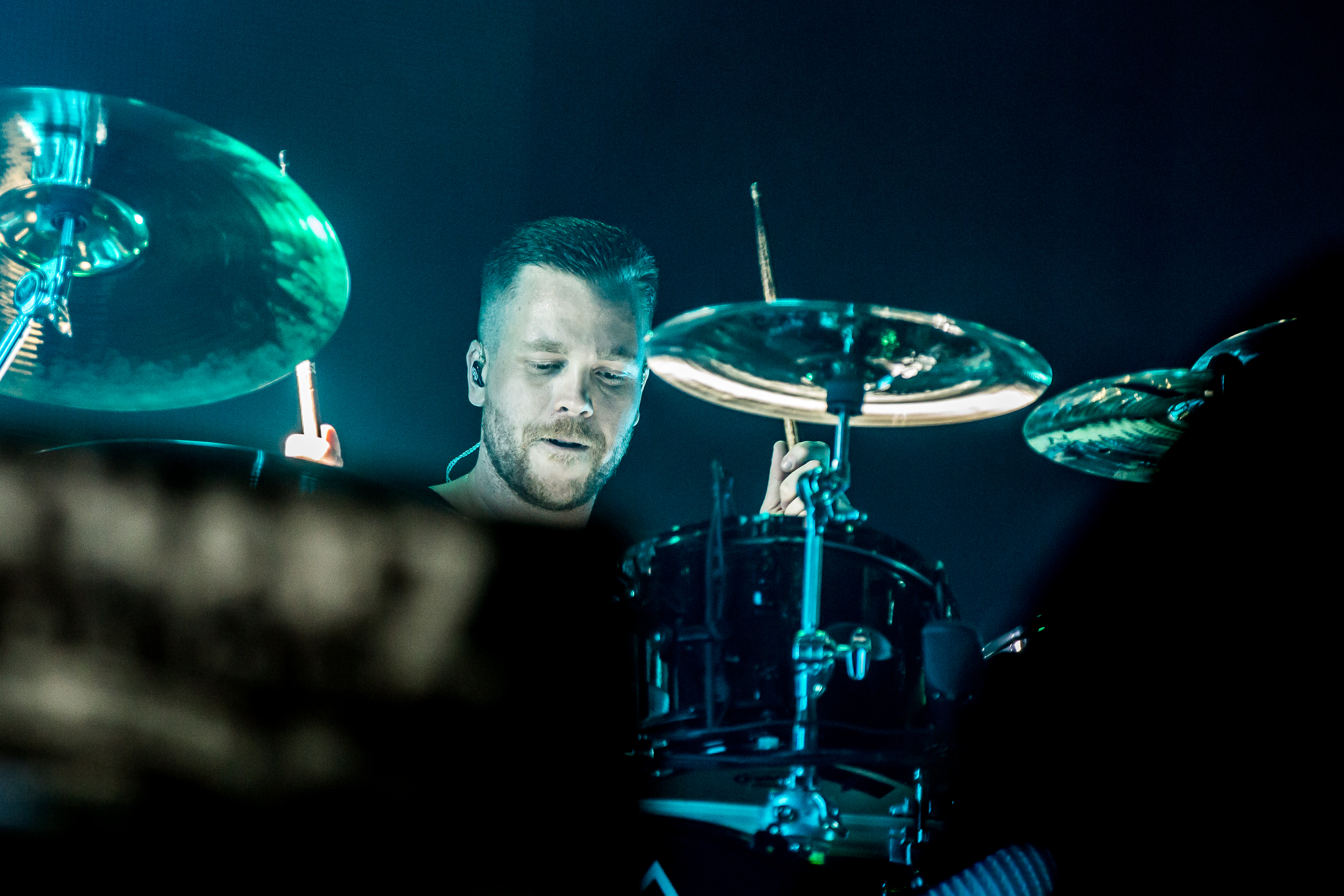
- Wayne performing with In Flames in 2018

Background information
- Born: Andrew Tanner Wayne; May 18, 1988 (age 38)
- Origin: San Diego, California, U.S.
- Genres: Post-hardcore; screamo; emo; hardcore punk; alternative metal; melodic death metal
- Occupation: Drummer
- Years active: 2006–present
- Formerly of: Chiodos; Underminded; Scary Kids Scaring Kids; In Flames

Andrew Tanner Wayne (born May 18, 1988) is an American drummer, best known for his participation in Underminded, Scary Kids Scaring Kids, and Chiodos. He has also filled in on drums for Underoath. Most recently, he was the drummer for Swedish heavy metal band In Flames from 2018 to 2025.

== Career ==
=== Underminded and Scary Kids Scaring Kids (1999–2009) ===
Wayne was the third drummer of the hardcore punk band Underminded, replacing Joe Mullen in 2006. He was only featured on one album, Eleven:Eleven, which was released in 2007. When asked by Something Punk about the current status of Underminded, Wayne said that "Nick Martin (vocals) and I decided that we wanted Underminded to be an open thing forever. I don't think Underminded will ever die. We've talked about possibly putting together a record next year, but who knows. Underminded is an outlet for us to do whatever the fuck we want." Wayne had a brief position in post-hardcore band Scary Kids Scaring Kids, but was only on one tour with the band.

=== Chiodos (2010–2012) ===
Wayne was announced to be replacing the former Chiodos drummer Derrick Frost on August 11, 2010. He was featured on their third studio album, Illuminaudio, which was released on October 5, 2010 through Equal Vision Records. According to an interview with Decoy Music, Wayne actually came up with the name of the album and explained its origin, saying that "Brad, Brandon and I were sitting in Brad's house discussing album titles. Someone brought up illuminati and I randomly said Illuminaudio. It means finding the light/positivity through sound, which ended up being a big theme on the record." On March 27, 2012, Tanner announced via his blog that he was leaving Chiodos because "our personal and business relationships went to shit."

=== Recent years (2014–present) ===
From 2014 to spring 2016, Wayne was working as a drum tech for the band Suicide Silence.

In July 2018, it was announced that Swedish metal band In Flames had recruited Wayne as the new drummer, replacing Joe Rickard before leaving in 2025.

== Discography ==
with Underminded

- Eleven:Eleven (Uprising Records, 2007)

with Chiodos

- Illuminaudio (Equal Vision Records, 2010)

with In Flames

- Foregone (Nuclear Blast Records, 2023)
