= Devil (Chiodos album) =

Studio album by Chiodos
- Released: April 1, 2014
- Recorded: 2013–2014, at Dreamwood Studios, Woodstock, NY
- Genre: Post-hardcore; emo; pop-punk
- Length: 51:31
- Label: Razor & Tie
- Producer: David Bottrill

Chiodos chronology
Illuminaudio (2010)	Devil (2014)

Singles from Devil
- 1. "Ole Fishlips Is Dead Now" Released: January 27, 2014; 2. "3 AM" Released: February 25, 2014; 3. "R2me2"/"Let Me Get You a Towel" Released: April 22, 2014

Devil is the fourth studio album by Michigan post-hardcore band Chiodos, released on April 1, 2014. This was the last studio album that Chiodos released before their 8-year break-up, from November 2016 to November 2023.

The album takes its name from the band's definition of the word "Devil." Returning vocalist Craig Owens explains:

Devil isn't something I thought long and hard about. It is something that hit me, and hard. I asked myself if I was brave enough to stand behind such a strong, emotionally evoking word.. and I knew right then, that was it. This title is not to be confused with the muscled, red horned man surrounded by fire. This is about the temptations of everyday life; the things that become regrets; the moments where you are forced to make a choice that will determine how it is that you look at yourself for the rest of your life. This album is my definition of Devil.

The band has also cited American writer Mitch Albom as a source of inspiration for the album.

This was the first album the band recorded after reuniting with original vocalist Craig Owens and original drummer Derrick Frost, and the first and only album to feature Thomas Erak of The Fall of Troy as lead guitarist after the departure of original lead guitarist Jason Hale. The album was released on April 1, 2014, by Razor & Tie. Several songs and videos were slated to be released leading up to the album's official debut.

The band headlined the Devil's Dance Tour 2014 early in the year in support of the album.

== Sales ==
The album debuted at No. 12 on the Billboard 200, with more than 18,000 copies sold during the first week. As of June 2015, the album has sold more than 100,000 copies worldwide.

== Critical reception ==
Professional ratings
Aggregate scores
Source	Rating
Metacritic	75/100
Review scores
Source	Rating
AllMusic	3.5/5 stars
Alternative Press	4/5 stars
The Oakland Press	3/4 stars
Outburn	9/10

At Alternative Press, Jason Pettigrew rated the album four stars out of five, writing that on the release the band "aren't settling for anything less than world domination" because "Producer Dave Bottrill has molded Chiodos's vision into a cohesive arc of power, finesse, quirks and accessibility in equal measures." Pettigrew finished with saying "Watch them make good on their promise." Amy Sciarretto of Outburn rated the album a nine out of a ten, stating that the release "is a full-bodied, dramatic, and richly textured collection of songs that remind us of the Chiodos we knew and love in the late 00s", and that the album has "so much going on with every track on Devil that you will emerge from the listening experience exhausted but enriched." At The Oakland Press, Gary Graff rated the album three stars out of four, saying that "Chiodos is back as it should be and rocking with its characteristic blast-furnace, angst-fueled intensity." Gregory Heaney of AllMusic rated the album three-and-a-half stars out of five, remarking that the release "sees them continuing to move forward again, and although Hale's presence will certainly be missed, fans of the band will find that the return of Frost and Owens more than makes up for the loss."

== Track listing ==
No.	Title	Length
1.	"U.G. Introduction"	0:53
2.	"We’re Talking About Practice"	3:12
3.	"Ole Fishlips Is Dead Now"	4:14
4.	"Why the Munsters Matter"	3:44
5.	"3 AM"	3:35
6.	"Sunny Days & Hand Grenades"	3:58
7.	"Duct Tape"	4:58
8.	"Behvis Bullock"	3:01
9.	"Looking for a Tornado"	3:42
10.	"Expensive Conversations in Cheap Motels"	3:23
11.	"I’m Awkward & Unusual"	3:06
12.	"Under Your Halo"	4:26
13.	"I Am Everything That's Normal"	9:19
Total length:		51:31

Japan Bonus tracks
No.	Title	Length
14.	"R2me2"	3:43
15.	"Let Me Get You a Towel"	2:58
Total length:		58:02

== Personnel ==
Chiodos

- Craig Owens – lead vocals
- Bradley Bell – keyboards, piano, vocals
- Thomas Erak – lead guitar, vocals
- Pat McManaman – rhythm guitar
- Matt Goddard – bass guitar
- Derrick Frost – drums, percussion

Production

- Produced by David Bottrill
- Additional Production and Engineering by Michael Phillips
- Mixed by Josh Wilbur
- Mastered by Brad Blackwood
