= The Heartless Control Everything =

EP by The Chiodos Bros.
- Released: January 25, 2003
- Recorded: November 2002
- Genre: Post-hardcore, emo
- Length: 29:20
- Label: Search and Rescue
- Producer: The Chiodos Bros.

The Chiodos Bros. chronology
The Best Way to Ruin Your Life (2002)	The Heartless Control Everything (2003)	All's Well That Ends Well (2005)

Professional ratings
Review scores
Source	Rating
LAS	Favorable

The Heartless Control Everything is the third EP from the American post-hardcore band The Chiodos Bros, later known simply as Chiodos. It was released January 25, 2003, on the label Search and Rescue Records. The title is a reference to the popular selling PS2 video game Kingdom Hearts, whereat the villains in the game are called the Heartless.

== Track listing ==
No.	Title	Length
1.	"Compromise of 1984"	4:29
2.	"Rainclouds for Eyeballs"	3:04
3.	"Ravishing Matt Ruth"	2:43
4.	"Vacation to Hell"	2:58
5.	"The Lover and the Liar"	5:02
6.	"Hathaway Lane"	2:15
7.	"Bulls Have Horns"	4:44
Total length:		29:20

== Personnel ==
- Craig Owens: Vocals
- Bradley Bell: Keyboard and Backing Vocals
- Chip Kelly: Guitar
- Pat McManaman: Guitar
- Matt Goddard: Bass
- Crosby Clark: Drums

== Reversed lyrics ==
At the beginning of "The Lover and the Liar" there are fast-spoken, backwards lyrics that when reversed again are revealed to be "How does it feel to know that you've taken someone's smile?". Spoken by lead singer Craig Owens.
