= Until God Shows =

Studio album by Destroy Rebuild Until God Shows
- Released: September 27, 2024
- Genre: Post-hardcore; pop; metalcore
- Length: 30:05
- Label: Velocity; Equal Vision
- Producer: Jonathan Dolese; Nick Scott; Erik Ron; Andrew Baylis; Michael Whitworth

Destroy Rebuild Until God Shows chronology
Destroy Rebuild (2022)	Until God Shows (2024)

Singles from Until God Shows
- 1. "Hunger Pangs" Released: May 30, 2024; 2. "Losers Stay Losers (Let-down)" Released: June 27, 2024; 3. "Malice" Released: July 25, 2024; 4. "It Follows" Released: August 29, 2024

Professional ratings
Review scores
Source	Rating
Outburn	8/10
Out of the Blue	3.3/5

Until God Shows is the third studio album by American post-hardcore solo project Destroy Rebuild Until God Shows. It was released on September 27, 2024, through Velocity and Equal Vision Records.

== Background ==
The band released the single "Hunger Pangs" on May 30, 2024, and announced a new album would be released later in the year. The single "Losers Stay Losers (Let-down)" was released on June 27, 2024, and revealed the album would be titled Until God Shows with a release date of September 27. A lyric video for the album's third single, "Malice", was released on July 25. The album's track listing was revealed on August 29 with the release of the single "It Follows".

== Track listing ==
No.	Title	Writer(s)	Length
1.	"It Follows"	Craig Owens, Mitchell Rogers, Blake Hardman, Erik Ron	2:28
2.	"Malice"	Owens, Rogers, Hardman, Ron	2:55
3.	"Headcase"	Owens, Rogers, Hardman, Bryan James Sammis, Jonathan Dolese	3:38
4.	"The Sweet Misery"	Owens, Hardman, Dolese, Cody Makenzie Hamann, Michael Dobbs	3:06
5.	"Hunger Pangs"	Owens, Hardman, Michael Whitworth, Andrew Baylis	3:00
6.	"Losers Stay Losers (Let-down)"	Owens, Hardman, Sammis, Dolese, Dobbs	3:13
7.	"Two Hand Touch"	Owens, Hardman, Ron, Dolese, Nick Scott, Garret Krebs	3:04
8.	"Steel"	Owens, Rogers, Hardman, Dolese, Hamann	3:11
9.	"Debt Collector (Best of Me)"	Owens, Hardman, Dolese, Dobbs, Sam Tinnesz	2:53
10.	"Crawl from Under"	Owens, Hardman, Dolese, Dobbs, Hamann	2:34

== Personnel ==
Destroy Rebuild Until God Shows

- Craig Owens – vocals, programming

Additional

- Mitchell Rogers – guitar, bass, programming
- Blake Hardman – guitar
- Jonathan Dolese – producer
- Nick Scott – producer
- Erik Ron – additional production on track 1
- Andrew Baylis – producer (track 5)
- Michael Whitworth – producer (track 5)
