= Isles & Glaciers =

American post-hardcore supergroup (2008–2010)

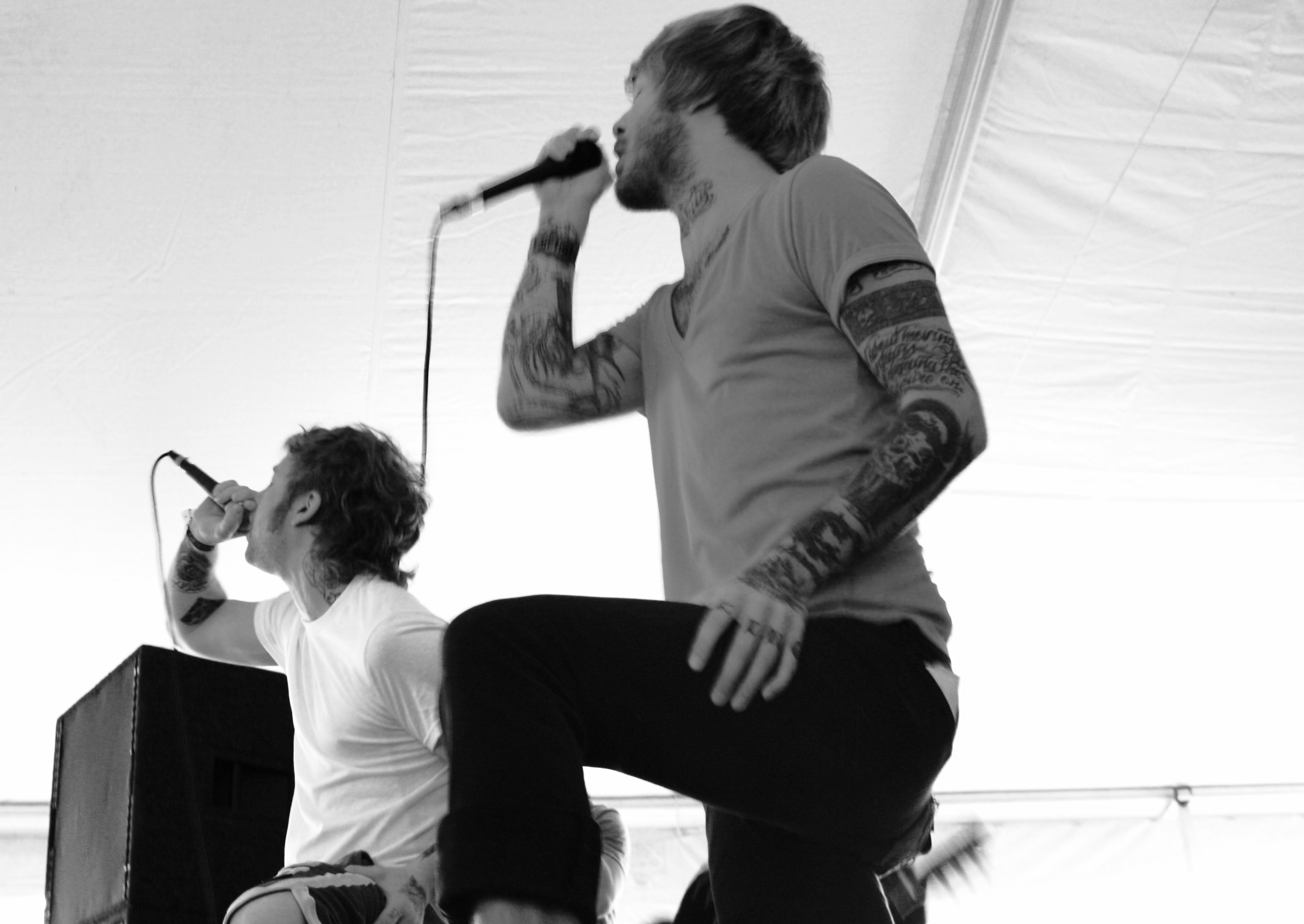
- Jonny Craig and Craig Owens of Isles & Glaciers performing their only show at SXSW.

Background information
- Origin: Royal Oak, Michigan, United States
- Genres: Post-hardcore; screamo; alternative rock; emo
- Years active: 2008–2010
- Label: Equal Vision
- Spinoffs: Destroy Rebuild Until God Shows
- Spinoff of: Chiodos; The Receiving End of Sirens; Dance Gavin Dance; Pierce the Veil; Emarosa; Cinematic Sunrise; Underminded
- Past members: Jonny Craig; Vic Fuentes; Mike Fuentes; Nick Martin; Craig Owens; Brian Southall; Matt Goddard
- Website: islesandglaciers.com

Isles & Glaciers was an American post-hardcore supergroup formed in 2008. They recorded material for their debut EP, The Hearts of Lonely People December 3–13, 2008 in Seattle, Washington and again in April 2009. It was produced by Casey Bates, and was released on March 9, 2010. Even though vocalist Craig Owens stated that the group will not be collaborating or releasing new material again, Vic Fuentes stated that the band may release more material in the future.

== History ==
Isles & Glaciers was first rumored to exist after Craig Owens (Chiodos, Destroy Rebuild Until God Shows) and Jonny Craig (Dance Gavin Dance, Emarosa) performed a show in Lexington, Kentucky on August 30, 2008. Owens confirmed the rumors on September 4, 2008. Alternative Press announced the project officially and released the band's final lineup on December 15, 2008.

On January 18, 2009, both Owens and Brian Southall premiered three rough demos, "Clush", "Hills Like White Elephants", and "Empty Sighs and Wine", for an upcoming EP, and took part in an interview with 89X Radio in Windsor, Canada.

Isles & Glaciers played their first and only scheduled live show on March 21, 2009, which was presented by Alternative Press at Emo's Bar in Austin, Texas for a free show during SXSW. In an interview done by DJ Rossstar on Stickam, Craig Owens stated that members in the band want to perform future shows in random locations, such as Alaska.

Their debut EP, The Hearts of Lonely People, was released on March 9, 2010. A remix of it was released on November 11, 2014.

== Band members ==
- Jonny Craig – vocals
- Craig Owens – vocals
- Vic Fuentes – vocals, rhythm guitar
- Nick Martin – lead guitar, backing vocals
- Brian Southall – guitars, keyboards, synthesizers
- Matt Goddard – bass guitar
- Mike Fuentes – drums

== Discography ==
- The Hearts of Lonely People (2010) – U.S. Billboard 200 number 104
- The Hearts of Lonely People (Remixes) (2014)
