= Bone Palace Ballet =

Studio album by Chiodos
- Released: September 4, 2007
- Recorded: 2007, at Saint Claire Recording Company, Lexington, Kentucky
- Genres: Post-hardcore; emo; alternative rock
- Length: 38:31; 54:56 (Reissue)
- Labels: Equal Vision (US); Warner Bros. Records(UK)
- Producer: Casey Bates

Chiodos chronology
All's Well That Ends Well (2005)	Bone Palace Ballet (2007)	Illuminaudio (2010)

2008 reissue cover
- Re-release Cover

Singles from Bone Palace Ballet
- 1. "Lexington (Joey Pea-Pot with a Monkey Face)" Released: March 11, 2008; 2. "The Undertaker's Thirst for Revenge Is Unquenchable (The Final Battle)" Released: 2008

Professional ratings
Review scores
Source	Rating
Absolutepunk.net	(81%)
Alternative Press	4.5/5 stars
Mammothpress.com	7/10 stars
Kerrang!	4/5 stars
NME	7/10 stars
Punknews.org	2/5 stars
Rocklouder	3/5 stars
Tuned Magazine	4/5 stars

Bone Palace Ballet is the second album by American post-hardcore band Chiodos, released on September 4, 2007. The album takes its name from a literary work of Charles Bukowski. It was their last album with vocalist Craig Owens and drummer Derrick Frost, until they both rejoined the band in 2012.

Following the album's release, it entered the U.S. Billboard 200 chart at number 5 and the Top Independent Albums at number 1, selling over 39,000 copies in its first week, making it one of the highest-charting post-hardcore albums to date. By January 2009, the album had sold more than 200,000 copies in the United States alone.

On September 4, 2007, Equal Vision Records released an opaque orange vinyl pressing of the album which included the full album on compact disc. It was limited to 2,000 copies.

Warner Bros. Records released Bone Palace Ballet: Grand Coda on January 26, 2009, as part of a new distribution deal in the UK.

== Track listing ==
No.	Title	Length
1.	"Is It Progression If a Cannibal Uses a Fork?" (featuring Jase Korman of The Number Twelve Looks Like You)	3:26
2.	"Lexington (Joey Pea-Pot with a Monkey Face)"	5:22
3.	"Bulls Make Money, Bears Make Money, Pigs Get Slaughtered" (featuring Nick Martin of Underminded and Jase Korman of The Number Twelve Looks Like You)	3:28
4.	"A Letter from Janelle"	3:16
5.	"I Didn't Say I Was Powerful, I Said I Was a Wizard"	4:13
6.	"Teeth the Size of Piano Keys"	3:23
7.	"Life Is a Perception of Your Own Reality"	3:46
8.	"If I Cut My Hair, Hawaii Will Sink"	2:23
9.	"Intensity in Ten Cities"	4:34
10.	"The Undertaker's Thirst for Revenge Is Unquenchable (The Final Battle)" (featuring Nick Martin of Underminded)	4:43
Total length:		38:31

Reissue: Bone Palace Ballet: Grand Coda
No.	Title	Length
1.	"Two Birds Stoned at Once"	2:52
2.	"Is It Progression If a Cannibal Uses a Fork?" (featuring Jase Korman of The Number Twelve Looks Like You)	3:26
3.	"Lexington (Joey Pea-Pot with a Monkey Face)"	5:22
4.	"Bulls Make Money, Bears Make Money, Pigs Get Slaughtered" (featuring Nick Martin of Underminded and Jase Korman of The Number Twelve Looks Like You)	3:28
5.	"A Letter from Janelle"	3:16
6.	"I Didn't Say I Was Powerful, I Said I Was a Wizard"	4:13
7.	"...And Then the Liver Screamed "Help!""	2:43
8.	"We Swam from Albatross, the Day We Lost Kailey Cost"	4:30
9.	"Life Is a Perception of Your Own Reality"	3:46
10.	"If I Cut My Hair, Hawaii Will Sink"	2:23
11.	"Smitten for the Mitten"	3:14
12.	"Intensity in Ten Cities"	4:34
13.	"The Undertaker's Thirst for Revenge is Unquenchable (The Final Battle)" (featuring Nick Martin of Underminded)	4:13
14.	"I Didn't Say I Was Powerful, I Said I Was a Wizard" (Acoustic)"	3:17
15.	"A Letter from Janelle" (Acoustic)"	3:38
Total length:		54:56

=== Additional information ===
In the DVD section of this reissue, there is an appearance by the Trailer Park Boys at the Chiodos Madison Square Garden performance, and footage of them shown backstage with the band. There are also live clips of the band at various shows, with the songs "A Letter from Janelle" and "Lexington. (Joey Pea-Pot with a Monkey Face)" played over the performances. The track "Teeth the Size of Piano Keys" was omitted from the reissue "just to mess with people," according to guitarist Pat McManaman. However, it is unclear why the spoken words at the end of "The Undertakers Thirst for Revenge Is Unquenchable (The Final Battle)" are missing. It may be due to possible copyright infringement of uncredited works.

The lyrics to "Teeth the Size of Piano Keys" are an adaptation of the Charles Bukowski poem "I'm in Love" and feature several direct quotations from the poem.

The spoken word segment at the end of "The Undertaker's Thirst for Revenge is Unquenchable" comes from the poem "Empty Is" by Rod McKuen.

== Title origins ==
- Bone Palace Ballet is the title of a book of poems by Charles Bukowski
- "Is It Progression If a Cannibal Uses a Fork?" is a misquote of Stanisław Jerzy Lec ("Is it progress if a cannibal uses knife and fork?")
- "Lexington. (Joey Pea-Pot with a Monkey Face)" is a combination of the name of Pat McManaman's first dog and Lexington, Kentucky, where the song was recorded.
- "Bulls Make Money, Bears Make Money, Pigs Get Slaughtered" is phrase commonly said by Mad Money host Jim Cramer. However, the phrase's origins go back much further to at least a century ago.
- "A Letter From Janelle" is a letter that was sent to Craig Owens by a friend, Nicole Rork. The lyrics are of the pieces that Craig feels comfortable sharing, as the letter, which he reviews in times of distress, still means a great deal to him.
- The title "I Didn't Say I Was Powerful, I Said I Was a Wizard" was said by Chiodos' guitar technician while he was high.
- The title "Teeth the Size of Piano Keys" is taken from Slaughterhouse 5 by Kurt Vonnegut.
- The title "If I Cut My Hair, Hawaii Will Sink" was named when Matt Goddard drunkenly spoke the words to the other band members.
- The title "Intensity in Ten Cities" is a quote from Mike Myers' character Wayne Campbell in the movie Wayne's World, alluding to the live album by Ted Nugent.
- The song "The Undertaker's Thirst for Revenge is Unquenchable. (The Final Battle)" pays homage to how the band used to watch wrestling when they were young. The opening line of the song is a quote from ‘’Harry Potter and the Goblet of Fire’’.
- The title "Two Birds Stoned at Once" comes from an episode of Trailer Park Boys, where Ricky mistakenly says it rather than "two birds with one stone."

== Usage in media ==
- The first single "Lexington (Joey Pea-Pot with a Monkey Face)" was featured as a Rock Band Network track in the game Rock Band 2 and it was also re-released as a DLC track in Rock Band 4.
- The song "I Didn't Say I Was Powerful, I Said I Was a Wizard" was featured as a DLC track in the game Rock Band 2 and it can also be played in some of the other Rock Band games.
- The song "Is It Progression if a Cannibal Uses a Fork?" was featured in the 2007's The Sims 2: Teen Style stuff pack.

== Personnel ==
Chiodos

- Craig Owens - lead vocals
- Bradley Bell - keyboards, piano, vocals
- Jason Hale - lead guitar
- Pat McManaman - rhythm guitar
- Matt Goddard - bass guitar
- Derrick Frost - drums, percussion

Production

- Produced by Casey Bates
- Engineered by Casey Bates, Tim Price, Bryan Beeler, Dan Korneff and David Bendeth
- Mixed by David Bendeth
- Mastered by Casey Bates and Ue Nastasi, at Sterling Sound, New York City
- Art direction and layout design by Paul A. Romano (workhardened.com)

Additional musicians

- Additional vocals by Nicholas Anthony Martin (3, 10) and Jesse Korman (1, 3)
- Violin by Victoria Parker
- Cello, Trumpet and trombone and orchestral arrangements by Phillip A. Peterson
- French horn by Jacob Hoffman

== Charts ==
Chart (2007)	Peak position
US Billboard Top 200	5
US Independent Albums	1
US Top Internet Albums	5
US Top Rock Albums	1
US Top Alternative Albums	1
