= Bradley Bell (musician) =

American musician (born 1983)

- Born: Bradley Dean Bell; March 18, 1983 (age 43)
- Origin: Davison, Michigan, United States
- Genres: Post-hardcore; pop punk; emo; indie rock; pop rock
- Occupations: Musician, singer
- Instruments: Vocals; piano; keyboards; synthesizers; bass
- Years active: 2002–2014
- Labels: Equal Vision, Warner Bros.
- Website: chiodos.net

Clinton Bradley David Bell (born March 18, 1983, in Davison, Michigan), known professionally as Bradley Bell, is an American musician, best known for being the keyboardist of post-hardcore band Chiodos, and also for being the keyboardist of pop punk band Cinematic Sunrise until their demise, and the keyboardist of experimental band The Sound of Animals Fighting. He was also in a pop punk band called Still No Sign, where he was the lead vocalist. Chiodos guitarist Pat McManaman was also in this band.

== Musical career ==
=== Still No Sign and Cinematic Sunrise (2000–2009) ===
Bell was the lead vocalist, along with members Pat McManaman, Matt Davis, and Chad Horton, of a pop punk band called Still No Sign. The band released one EP, literally entitled The EP, but disbanded in 2001 so Bell and McManaman could move on to Chiodos.

Bell was the keyboardist of pop punk band Cinematic Sunrise, along with Craig Owens, Underminded frontman Nick Martin, and the Agency Group manager Dave Shapiro. He was featured on their first and only EP, A Coloring Storybook and Long Playing Record. During the band's last six shows, Bell was absent from all of them, presumably because of bad terms between him and Owens.

=== Chiodos (2001–2014) ===
Bell is the only keyboardist to ever be in post-hardcore band Chiodos, previously known as the Chiodos Bros. Bell has been featured on every release by the band so far, except for their debut EP, The Chiodos Bros. Bell posted on his instagram profile early 2024 saying that he, along with other previous members of Chiodos, would not be performing with Chiodos in the future, saying they “encourage [fans] to continue enjoying the music and the memories we shared together.”

== Discography ==
with Still No Sign

- The EP (Self-released, 2001)

with Chiodos

- The Best Way to Ruin Your Life (Self-released, 2002)
- The Heartless Control Everything (Self-released, 2003)
- All's Well That Ends Well (Equal Vision Records, 2005)
- Bone Palace Ballet (Equal Vision Records, 2007)
- Illuminaudio (Equal Vision Records, 2010)
- Devil (Razor & Tie, 2014)

with Cinematic Sunrise

- A Coloring Storybook and Long Playing Record (Equal Vision Records, 2008)
