= Chiodo =

Chiodo is a surname. Notable people with the surname include:

- Agostino Chiodo (1791–1861), Italian politician and prime minister of the Kingdom of Sardinia
- Andy Chiodo (born 1983), Canadian ice hockey goaltender
- Diego Chiodo (born 1970), Argentinian hockey player
- Frank Chiodo (born 1968), American politician
- Joe Chiodo (born 1958), American comics colorist
- Ned Chiodo (1942–2025), American politician
- Peter Chiodo (born 1940), American, mafia captain turned witness
- The Chiodo Brothers, filmmakers famous for Killer Klowns from Outer Space

== See also ==
- Chiodos, band named after the brothers who produced an album also referencing them:
  - The Chiodos Brothers. (acoustic)
