= The Hearts of Lonely People =

EP by Isles & Glaciers
- Released: March 9, 2010
- Recorded: December 3–13, 2008; April 2009
- Genre: Post-hardcore; screamo; alternative rock; emo
- Length: 26:41
- Label: Equal Vision; Rise
- Producer: Casey Bates

Professional ratings
Review scores
Source	Rating
Absolutepunk.net	(80%)
AllMusic	3.5/5 stars

The Hearts of Lonely People is the first and only EP by American alternative rock/post-hardcore rock supergroup Isles & Glaciers. The record was released on March 9, 2010, through Equal Vision Records, sold exclusively through Hot Topic stores and online retailers. A remix version of the EP was released in 2014.

Vocalist Craig Owens confirmed in late 2010 that Isles & Glaciers was a "one time thing side project", making this the only release by the band.

== Track listing ==
No.	Title	Length
1.	"Kings and Chandeliers"	1:15
2.	"Hills Like White Elephants"	3:47
3.	"Clush"	4:10
4.	"Empty Sighs and Wine"	4:04
5.	"Oceans for Backyards"	1:40
6.	"Viola Lion"	4:45
7.	"Cemetery Weather"	7:00
Total length:		26:41

The Hearts of Lonely People Remixes
No.	Title	Length
1.	"Kings and Chandeliers II"	4:11
2.	"Hills Like White Elephants" (Brian Southall Remix)	4:20
3.	"Clush" (Knights Remix)	4:25
4.	"Empty Sighs & Wine" (Citizun Remix)	3:37
5.	"Oceans for Backyards II"	2:58
6.	"Viola Lion" (dr00gs Remix)	5:53
7.	"Cemetery Weather" (Piano Version; featuring Kara Dupuy)	5:30
Total length:		30:58

== Personnel ==
Isles & Glaciers

- Craig Owens – lead vocals
- Jonny Craig – lead vocals
- Vic Fuentes – vocals, rhythm guitar
- Nick Martin – lead guitar, vocals
- Brian Southall – guitars, keyboards
- Matt Goddard – bass guitar
- Mike Fuentes – drums

Production

- Casey Bates – producer

Artwork

- Drew Roulette

== Charts ==
Chart (2010)	Peak position
US Billboard 200	104
US Alternative Albums	20
US Top Heatseekers	1
US Rock Albums	30
