= All's Well That Ends Well (Chiodos album) =

Studio album by Chiodos
- Released: July 26, 2005
- Recorded: February 2005
- Studio: Audiolux (Elmore, Ohio)
- Genres: Post-hardcore; screamo
- Length: 42:15
- Label: Equal Vision
- Producer: Marc Hudson

Chiodos chronology
The Heartless Control Everything (2003)	All's Well That Ends Well (2005)	Bone Palace Ballet (2007)

2006 reissue cover

Professional ratings
Review scores
Source	Rating
AbsolutePunk	79%
AllMusic	3.5/5 stars
Alternative Press	5/5 stars
MammothPress.com	8/10 stars
Punknews.org	3/5 stars

All's Well That Ends Well is the debut studio album by American post-hardcore band Chiodos, released on July 26, 2005, by Equal Vision Records. Four music videos were made for the songs "One Day All Women Will Become Monsters", "The Words 'Best Friend' Become Redefined", "Baby, You Wouldn't Last a Minute on the Creek", and "All Nereids Beware". The album sold more than 200,000 copies by 2008.

The song "To Trixie And Reptile, Thanks For Everything" is a reference to ex-girlfriends of band members Craig Owens and Bradley Bell.

== Track listing ==
No.	Title	Length
1.	"Prelude"	0:48
2.	"All Nereids Beware"	4:05
3.	"One Day Women Will All Become Monsters"	3:32
4.	"Expired in Goreville"	2:55
5.	"Baby, You Wouldn't Last a Minute on the Creek"	4:40
6.	"The Words 'Best Friend' Become Redefined"	3:36
7.	"Interlude, Pt. 1"	0:59
8.	"There's No Penguins in Alaska"	4:33
9.	"Interlude, Pt. 2"	1:16
10.	"We're Gonna Have Us a Champagne Jam"	4:19
11.	"No Hardcore Dancing in the Living Room"	5:10
12.	"Who's Sandie Jenkins"	1:59
13.	"To Trixie and Reptile, Thanks for Everything"	4:17
Total length:		42:15

Re-release bonus tracks
No.	Title	Length
14.	"Baby, You Wouldn't Last a Minute on the Creek" (Acoustic)	4:39
15.	"Queen of Diamonds" (Live Demo)	2:17
16.	"Lindsay Quit Lollygagging" (Acoustic)	3:57
Total length:		53:03

=== Re-release DVD ===
Live At The Metro – Chicago

- "There's No Penguins In Alaska"
- "Baby, You Wouldn't Last a Minute on the Creek"

Live At Bamboozle – New Jersey

- "The Words 'Best Friend' Become Redefined"
- "All Nereids Beware"

Live At The Chain Reaction – California

- "To Trixie And Reptile, Thanks For Everything" (Acoustic)

Home Movies

- On Tour With Chiodos
- Recording 'Lindsay Quit Lollygagging'

== Personnel ==
Chiodos

- Craig Owens – vocals
- Jason Hale – lead guitar
- Pat McManaman – rhythm guitar
- Matt Goddard – bass guitar
- Derrick Frost – drums
- Bradley Bell – keyboards, piano, vocals

Production

- Produced, engineered and mixed by Marc Hudson
- Mastered by Alan Douches, at West West Side Music, West New York / Tenafly, New Jersey
- Art direction and design by Paul A. Romano (workhardened.com)

== Charts ==
Year	Chart	Position
2005	U.S. Billboard Top 200	164
2005	Independent Albums	11
2005	Top Heatseekers	3
