= Brandon Bolmer =

American singer-songwriter, music producer, and visual artist

Brandon Allen Bolmer
- Born: Brandon Allen Bolmer; 1986 (age 39–40)
- Origin: Murrieta, California US
- Genres: Electronic; experimental rock
- Occupations: Singer-songwriter, music producer, composer, musician, artist, graphic designer, art director, 3d motion designer
- Instruments: Vocals, drums, synthesizers
- Years active: 2002–present
- Labels: Warner Bros., Equal Vision, Fearless
- Formerly of: Yesterdays Rising

Brandon Allen Bolmer is an American singer/songwriter, music producer, and visual artist.

== Career ==
=== Yesterdays Rising (2002–2010) ===
Brandon was the original and only vocalist of Yesterdays Rising, being a founding member along with Richie Ochoa (guitar), Jamie Ethridge (drums), Justin Panno (bass guitar), and Jon Bloom (guitar), who formed in 2002. The group released their first EP, Ship of Relations, in 2003. The band was then signed to Fearless Records in 2004, followed by a full run of Warped Tour. At the time, the band was considered to be one of the youngest to travel on Warped Tour, and garnered musical similarities to Rage Against the Machine and Deftones. Yesterdays Rising released their debut full-length album, Lightworker, in 2005. From 2006 to 2010 the band toured several times in the US, Canada, and Japan. They continued to write new music but no new music was released except a handful of demos. On February 8, 2010, it was rumored that Brandon was leaving Yesterdays Rising to join Chiodos, which led to the ending of the band.

=== Chiodos (2010–2012) ===
Bolmer was officially announced to have joined Chiodos on February 11, 2010, along with the announcement of Tanner Wayne being the new drummer. after a falling-out between the band and former vocalist Craig Owens, despite officially saying they would "not be discussing the reasons that this needed to happen." The news of Owens' removal was announced on September 24, 2009. The track listing, cover art, title, and release date on their third studio album and only album with Bolmer, Illuminaudio, were released online on August 2, 2010. Their record label, Equal Vision Records, confirmed this on August 9, 2010. The album started streaming on the band's MySpace page on September 29, 2010. The album was met with overwhelmingly positive reviews. On March 27, 2012, Brandon decided to depart from the band alongside drummer Tanner Wayne.

=== Maskarade (2012–present) ===
On May 21, 2012, Brandon released his first song under the moniker Maskarade. The song was a remix of "Settle Down" by Warner Brothers recording artist Kimbra. On May 28, 2012, the first original single titled "Light Years" was released. On February 3, 2014, he released the first EP of his solo career, "Light and Dark", which debuted at #1 on the Bandcamp best seller chart.

== Discography ==
with Yesterdays Rising

- Ship of Relations EP (Self-released, 2003)
- When We Speak We Breathe EP (Fearless Records, 2004)
- Lightworker (Fearless Records, 2005)

with Chiodos

- Illuminaudio (Equal Vision Records, 2010)

as Maskarade

- Kimbra "Settle Down" (Maskarade Remix) (Self-released, May 21, 2012)
- Light Years (Self-released, June 4, 2012)
- One More Try (Timmy T Cover) (Self-released, June 11, 2012)
- "Fire to the Eye" (Self-released, June 25, 2012)
- "Ready" (Self-released, July 9, 2012)
- "Ready" (Cinematic Version) Teaser + Studio Video (July 16, 2012)
- "Ready" (Cinematic Version) (Self-released, July 23, 2012)
- Light and Dark EP (Self-released, February 3, 2014)
- Elliphant "Revolusion" (Maskarade Remix) (July 6, 2014)
- "Chant of the Bells" (Self-released, December 22, 2014)
- "Analysis Paralysis Part 2" (Self-released, February 3, 2015)
