= A Coloring Storybook and Long-Playing Record =

EP by Cinematic Sunrise
- Released: May 13, 2008
- Recorded: Bryan Supreme Recording, Novi, MI
- Genres: Pop punk, emo, pop rock
- Length: 21:46; 27:51 (Re-Issue)
- Label: Equal Vision
- Producer: Bryan Beeler

Professional ratings
Review scores
Source	Rating
Sputnikmusic	3/5 stars

A Coloring Storybook and Long-Playing Record is the debut and only EP by American pop punk band Cinematic Sunrise, a side project of Chiodos' Bradley Bell and Craig Owens. The pair's pop rock project is strictly about having a good time and making music that is innocent and fun to play. "Basically, the whole idea - everything about Cinematic Sunrise - is just happy and fun. And there's nothing more fun than coloring," explains vocalist Craig Owens about the decision to include a coloring book with their aptly titled debut EP A Coloring Storybook and Long Playing Record. It was originally released with four colored pencils intended for use in a book that includes drawings of animals with caricatures of the band members hidden somewhere in the environment.

Craig Owens said in an interview that he requested crayons, not colored pencils. He was supposedly disappointed by Equal Vision's mishap.

On October 14, 2008, Equal Vision Records re-released A Coloring Storybook and Long-Playing Record. The re-release includes two bonus tracks titled, "If Lilly Isn't Back by Sunset" and "Crossing Our Fingers for Summer".

== Track listing ==
Source: Amazon

All tracks are written by Cinematic Sunrise.

No.	Title	Length
1.	"Pulling a Piano from a Pond"	3:31
2.	"Goodbye Friendship, Hello Heartache"	3:17
3.	"Umbrellas and Elephants"	3:32
4.	"Our Honeymoon at Weston Hills"	3:34
5.	"The Wordless"	3:25
6.	"You Told Me You Loved Me"	4:27

Re-release
No.	Title	Length
7.	"Crossing Our Fingers for the Summer"	3:00
8.	"If Lilly Isn't Back by Sunset"	3:05

== Personnel ==
Source: Official Equal Vision site

- Craig Owens – lead vocals
- Bryan Beeler – guitars
- Marcus VanKirk – bass guitar
- Bradley Bell – keyboards, piano, synthesizers
- Dave Shapiro – drums

Album Version of The Wordless
