= D.R.U.G.S. (album) =

D.R.U.G.S

Studio album by Destroy Rebuild Until God Shows
- Released: February 22, 2011
- Recorded: July – October 2010
- Genres: Post-hardcore; screamo; alternative rock; emo
- Length: 37:40
- Labels: Sire, Decaydance
- Producer: John Feldmann

Destroy Rebuild Until God Shows chronology
D.R.U.G.S (2011)	Destroy Rebuild (2022)

Singles from D.R.U.G.S.
- 1. "If You Think This Song Is About You, It Probably Is" Released: November 11, 2010; 2. "Mr. Owl Ate My Metal Worm" Released: December 6, 2010; 3. "Sex Life" Released: January 18, 2011; 4. "My Swagger Has a First Name" Released: January 31, 2011

Professional ratings
Review scores
Source	Rating
AbsolutePunk	(78%)
AllMusic	2.5/5 stars
Alternative Press	4/5 stars
BLARE Magazine	2.5/5 stars
CultureTease	6/10 stars
Rock Sound	(7/10)

D.R.U.G.S. is the debut studio album by American post-hardcore band Destroy Rebuild Until God Shows released on February 22, 2011.

== Production and recording ==
As of August 25, 2010, the band is situated in Los Angeles recording their upcoming album with producer John Feldmann. According to a Twitter post made by Craig Owens on October 17, 2010, D.R.U.G.S.' album is finished and currently is waiting release. A similar post was also made by Matt Good a day later.

On November 11, 2010, Destroy Rebuild Until God Shows released their first single, "If You Think This Song Is About You, It Probably Is." On December 6, 2010, they released their second single, "Mr. Owl Ate My Metal Worm," (which is one of two songs, along with "Laminated E.T. Animal," whose titles are both palindromes).

On January 17, 2011, a supposed "sex tape" featuring Craig Owens and another woman was released, along with stills, on the website Is Anyone Up?. The video turned out to be a hoax, as the ending revealed it to be promotion for the music video D.R.U.G.S.' single "Sex Life" which would premiere the next day, January 18.

Also on January 18, pre-orders for their Regular and Deluxe versions were made available on iTunes. On February 1, "My Swagger Has a First Name" was released for streaming on the internet.

On February 9, 2011, Alternative Press released an exclusive album reveal video for "The Only Thing You Talk About" which is Destroy Rebuild Until God Shows's legal rendition of the song "Thermacare" originally by Chiodos. On February 10, 2011, D.R.U.G.S. released another album reveal video for the song "Graveyard Dancing" on MTV. Since then, they have released the songs on various media outlets, including "Laminated E.T. Animal", "Stop Reading, Start Doing Pushups" and "I'm The Rehab, You're The Drugs" on AbsolutePunk, Noisecreep, and Friends or Enemies. An album reveal video has been released for every song on the album.

The music video for "If You Think This Song Is About You, It Probably Is," was released on December 2, 2010. The official video for the song "Sex Life", featuring the band performing this time, was released on April 7, 2011.

On July 12, 2011, D.R.U.G.S. released a live EP titled "Live From Hot Topic", which includes 5 live versions of songs from the album: "The Only Thing You Talk About", "My Swagger has a First Name", "Mr. Owl Ate My Metal Worm", "Graveyard Dancing" and "If You Think This Song is About You, It Probably Is".

== Sales ==
The album sold 14,000+ copies in its first week debuting at No. 29 on the Billboard 200. The album has since hit No. 1 on Billboard's U.S. Hard Rock list.

== Track listing ==
All tracks are written by Destroy Rebuild Until God Shows.

Original CD
No.	Title	Length
1.	"If You Think This Song Is About You, It Probably Is"	2:31
2.	"The Only Thing You Talk About"	3:20
3.	"Graveyard Dancing"	2:59
4.	"Mr. Owl Ate My Metal Worm"	3:26
5.	"Sex Life"	3:30
6.	"Laminated E.T. Animal"	3:32
7.	"Stop Reading, Start Doing Pushups"	2:32
8.	"I'm the Rehab, You're the Drugs"	4:04
9.	"I'm Here to Take the Sky"	3:53
10.	"The Hangman"	3:50
11.	"My Swagger Has a First Name" (The song "My Swagger Has a First Name" ends at 3:43. After 2 minutes of silence, at 5:43, an untitled hidden track begins.)	7:48

Japanese and iTunes bonus track
No.	Title	Length
12.	"A Little Kiss and Tell"	3:22

iTunes deluxe edition
No.	Title	Length
13.	"If You Think This Song Is About You, It Probably Is" (Video)	8:30
14.	"Documentary" (Video)	19:01

B-sides
No.	Title	Length
1.	"Ghost Town" (performed live)
2.	"The Holly Situation"	4:03
3.	"Rehab in Rifle Rounds"	3:15
4.	"Scream if You're Crazy"	3:37
5.	"Graveyard Dancing" (acoustic version)	3:00
6.	"Never Odd or Even" (Appears on copyright record but never released.)

== Personnel ==
Destroy Rebuild Until God Shows

- Craig Owens – lead vocals, keyboards
- Matt Good – lead guitar, vocals, keyboards
- Nick Martin – rhythm guitar, vocals
- Adam Russell – bass guitar
- Aaron Stern – drums, percussion

Production

- Produced, Mixed, Additional bass, String arrangements and vocals by John Feldmann
- Engineered by John Feldmann, Brandon Paddock and Spencer Hoad
- Additional programming by John Feldmann and Brandon Paddock
- A&R by John Feldmann, Craig Aaronson and Pete Wentz
- Product manager: Scott Frost
- Creative directors: Frank Maddocks, Donny Phillips and Norman Wonderly
- Package design by Donny Phillips
- Illustration by Mark Brown
- Photography by Tamar Levine
