= Yesterdays Rising =

American post-hardcore band

- Origin: Murrieta, California, U.S.
- Genres: Post-hardcore; progressive rock; experimental rock
- Years active: 2002–2010
- Label: Fearless
- Past members: Jon Bloom; Brandon Bolmer; Jamie Ethridge; Steven Fylpaa; Jake Justice; Ryan Magdaleno; Richie Ochoa; Justin Panno

Yesterdays Rising was an American post-hardcore band from Murrieta, California, in Riverside County, United States.

== History ==
Yesterdays Rising formed in 2002 and self-released their first EP (Ship of Relations) in 2003. The group signed to Fearless Records in 2004 and released a second EP (When We Speak, We Breathe) following it up with a run on the Vans Warped Tour 2004. With all of them still attending high school, they were said to have been one of the youngest bands to ever travel with the Warped Tour. The following year the band released a full-length record on Fearless Records (Lightworker) . The album was released while on the 2-month-long Warped Tour 2005. After that, they made many trips around the U.S. and Canada. In early 2006 they toured in Japan for the Japanese release of their full length (Lightworker). In April 2007 drummer Jamie Ethridge left the band and was replaced by Ryan Magdaleno; Ethridge later joined Scary Kids Scaring Kids. Around the same time the group parted ways with Fearless Records and began writing in preparation for a new album. In May and June 2008 Yesterdays Rising tracked 3 new songs "The Art of Fear", "Labyrinth", and "The Alarm" with producer Aaron Edwards. These 3 songs were mixed by producer Beau Burchell from Saosin. Former singer Brandon Bolmer was announced as the new singer for Chiodos on February 28, 2010. According to drummer, Ryan Magdaleno, Yesterday's Rising has broken up.

Since all this buzz is goin on about this, ill confirm here that Yesterdays Rising is broken up officially. It was on good terms and all of us are still friends. I wish Brandon the best of luck and have no doubts that he'll kill it with Chiodos!

Ryan, formerly of Yesterday's Rising

== Members ==
Final line-up

- Jon Bloom – guitar (2002–2010)
- Justin Panno – bass (2004–2010)
- Ryan Magdaleno – drums (2007–2010)

Former members

- Brandon Bolmer – vocals (2002–2009)
- Steven Fylpaa – bass (2002–2004)
- Jake Justice – drums (2002–2004)
- Richie Ochoa – guitar (2002–2008)
- Jamie Ethridge – drums (2004–2007)

== Discography ==
- Ship of Relations EP (Self-released, 2003)
- When We Speak We Breathe EP (Fearless Records, 2004)
- Lightworker (Fearless Records, 2005)
