= Cinematic Sunrise =

American pop punk band (2005–2009)

- Origin: Detroit, Michigan, United States
- Genres: Pop punk, emo
- Years active: 2005–2009
- Label: Equal Vision
- Past members: Craig Owens; Bryan Beeler; Marcus Van Kirk; Nick Martin; Bradley Bell; Dave Shapiro; Eric Nicolau; Tony Campbell; Ben Wixson; Brandon Kubiak

Cinematic Sunrise was a pop punk American band signed to Equal Vision Records. It consisted of Craig Owens (vocals) and Bradley Bell (piano), along with Bryan Beeler (guitar), Marcus VanKirk (bass), Nick Martin (guitar), and Dave Shapiro (drums).

== History ==
Owens and Beeler have been members of Cinematic Sunrise since its formation in the Spring of 2005 when the band was founded with Ben Wixson, Tony Campbell, and Brandon Kubiak of Detroit-area band, Only in Movies. Beeler also played in the group Class of '83.

This lineup was short-lived, and the band regrouped with drummer Dave Shapiro of Count the Stars, Marcus Van Kirk of Radio Pirate DJ, Bradley Bell, and Nick Martin of both Underminded and Isles & Glaciers. Owens and Bell were both in Chiodos at the time Cinematic Sunrise was formed. As Cinematic Sunrise, they were in the middle of a deal with Chiodos's label, Equal Vision, in 2008. The group's debut EP, the misleadingly titled A Coloring Storybook and Long Playing Record, was released on May 13, 2008. Beeler recorded, produced, and engineered the EP. The EP dented the Billboard charts at No. 196 and hit No. 8 on the Top Heatseekers chart, as well as No. 26 on the Top Independent Albums chart. The EP was re-released in late October 2008, with two new songs, due to selling out of the original pressing of 10,000.

The group announced six final shows in December 2009. Pete Wentz of Fall Out Boy joined the band for a few songs each night. Wentz came onstage as the band jokingly kicked Marcus Van Kirk off stage so Wentz could play, Marcus is still a member of the band and Owens' best friend. Bradley Bell was absent from this tour, presumably because he and Owens were not on good terms regarding their Chiodos split, and all keyboard parts were looped live. Drummer Dave Shapiro was also unable to play the band's final dates due to his conflicting schedule with The Agency Group.

== Discography ==
- A Coloring Storybook and Long Playing Record (Equal Vision Records, 2008)
