= Neubert =

Neubert is a surname. Notable people with the surname include:

- Blake Paul Neubert (born 1981), American painter, illustrator and writer now based in Fort Collins, Colorado
- Julie Neubert, British actress who is perhaps best known for playing the ill-fated Wendy in the first series of Survivors in 1975
- Keith Neubert (born 1964), professional American football tight end in the National Football League
- Klaus-Dieter Neubert (born 1949), German rower who competed for East Germany in the 1968 and 1972 Summer Olympics
- Michael Neubert (1933–2014), Conservative MP for Romford from 1974 until 1997
- Ramona Neubert (born 1958), former heptathlete from East Germany
- Rudolf Neubert (1914–1995), highly decorated Oberstleutnant in the Wehrmacht during World War II and an Oberst in the Bundeswehr
- Thomas Neubert (born 1980), German footballer
