= Brian Southall =

- Born: Brian Michael Southall; February 16, 1982 (age 44)
- Origin: Detroit, Michigan, United States
- Genres: Post-hardcore, experimental rock, ambient, emo, pop-punk
- Occupations: Musician, vocalist, talent manager, producer
- Instruments: Guitar, drums, keyboard, synthesizer, vocals
- Years active: 1999–present
- Labels: Cloud Over Head, Skipworth, Forge Again, Thorp (fordirelifesake); One Day Savior, Ferret (Boys Night Out); Triple Crown (The Receiving End of Sirens); Equal Vision (Isles & Glaciers)
- Website: www.myspace.com/islesandglaciers

Brian Michael Southall (born February 16, 1982, in Detroit, Michigan, United States) is an American guitarist, drummer, keyboardist, vocalist, producer, and band manager. He is known for playing in bands fordirelifesake, Boys Night Out, The Receiving End of Sirens, Isles & Glaciers, and The Company We Keep. He was the tour manager for Motion City Soundtrack and for All Time Low before transitioning to production management in 2018 for different acts such as Billie Eilish and Pharrell Williams.

== Musical career ==
=== Mycomplex (1999-2000) ===
Mycomplex was a technical Skatepunk band from Detroit featuring most of the lineup that would become Rescue. Southall quit Mycomplex in 2000 and the band dissolved, forming Rescue shortly after.

=== Rescue (2000-2002) ===
Rescue formed in 2000 after mycomplex broke up, they had a couple drummers try out before Southall would make up with the guys from Mycomplex and join the band. they would release an ep called ‘Even People Are Not The Odds’ and an album called ‘Volume Plus Volume’ both in 2002. That year a Spider bit southall in the leg on tour. He flew home and the drummer of Grayson/Wafflehouse* stepped in and took over as drummer moving forward. Brian is quoted as saying he likes to pretend the spider never existed and the guys just kicked him out of the band.

=== fordirelifesake (1999–2004) ===
Southall joined post-hardcore band fordirelifesake in 1999. He recorded both full-length albums by the band; Breathing in Is Only Half the Function and Dance.Pretend.Forget.Defend. He left the band in 2004 in order to join another group.

=== Boys Night Out (2004–2006) ===
After leaving fordirelifesake, Southall joined fellow post-hardcore band Boys Night Out. He recorded their second album, Trainwreck, and their digital-only EP Fifty Million People Can't Be Wrong, before leaving the band in late 2006.

=== The Receiving End of Sirens (2007–2010) ===
Southall left Boys Night Out in order to join experimental rock band The Receiving End of Sirens in 2007. He recorded their second and final studio album, The Earth Sings Mi Fa Mi, before the band's break up in 2009. However, on December 22, 2009, he announced that they would be playing Skate Fest 2010 as a reunion and final show.

=== Isles and Glaciers (2008–2010) ===
Southall was later announced, in the December 2008 edition of Alternative Press, to be the official guitarist and keyboard player of experimental post-hardcore supergroup Isles & Glaciers. He has recorded their debut EP, The Hearts of Lonely People, and played the band's first and only show at SXSW.

In late 2010, Jonny Craig announced that Isles & Glaciers had broken up, stating that the band was "only a one time thing".

During November 2014, Isles & Glaciers released a remix EP that was composed entirely by Southall. The EP was not well received by fans.

=== The Company We Keep (2012) ===
In 2012, a new band featuring Justin Pierre of Motion City Soundtrack, Brian Southall, Amy Brennan, and Brendan Morgan was announced. Called The Company We Keep, they announced their debut self-titled EP on April 24, 2012.

=== All Time Low (2015–2018) ===
In 2013, All Time Low's longtime tour manager Matt Flyzik stepped down. The band went on through 2014 on a few short tours and then finished the year recording their sixth studio album, Future Hearts. In 2015, following the announcement of tours and other events in support of the album, Southall became their tour manager. Southall ended his work with All Time Low in London during The Young Renegades UK Tour 2018.

=== Pharrell Williams (2018–present) ===
Southall is currently the production manager for Pharrell Williams.

== Discography ==
with fordirelifesake

- Breathing in Is Only Half the Function (Cloud Over Head/Skipworth, 2002)
- Breathing in Is Only Half the Function [Remastered] (Forge Again, 2002)
- Dance.Pretend.Forget.Defend (Thorp/Skipworth, 2004)

with Boys Night Out

- Trainwreck (Ferret, 2005)
- Fifty Million People Can't Be Wrong (EP) (Ferret, 2007)

with The Receiving End of Sirens

- The Earth Sings Mi Fa Mi (Triple Crown, 2007)

with Isles & Glaciers

- The Hearts of Lonely People (Equal Vision, 2010)
- The Hearts of Lonely People (Remixes) (Equal Vision, 2014)

with The Company We Keep

- "The Company We Keep" (EP) (MAD Dragon Records/The Boombox Generation, 2012)

=== Production/additional musicianship ===
with Craig Owens

- With Love (Equal Vision, 2009)
  - Songwriter, producer, guitar, drums, percussion, programming
