= Flint Local 432 =

Flint, Michigan music venue

Coordinates: 43°00′56.2″N 83°41′30.8″W

The Flint Local 432 (or "the Local") is a non-profit 501(c)(3), all-ages, substance free music venue located in downtown Flint, Michigan. The Local's name is a reference to the autoworker unions located in the area. It was founded in the mid-1980s by Joel Rash, for the purpose of providing the Flint area with an all-ages venue for local and national bands to play that was focused on the music. Even though it has faced many challenges and changed buildings multiple times, the Local has continued to survive to the current day and been a home to any band that wants to be heard.

In 2011, the Local established 501(c)(3) non-profit status by merging with then defunct non-profit Red Ink Flint. (now Factory Two) After receiving a generous grant from the Charles Stewart Mott Foundation, the Local renovated its permanent space and officially reopened its doors at 124 W. First Street in April 2012. In addition to providing a space for local musicians and bands to play, the Local serves as an incubator for young entrepreneurs seeking to start businesses as shown with the recent opening of Bearded Lady Records, an independently owned record store.

In recent history, the success of local bands Chiodos and The Swellers—who both got their start playing at the 432—has generated a significant amount of fresh interest in the venue. The Local has received positive mentions in many national publications and blogs including Blender (magazine) and Alternative Press.

Mustard Plug

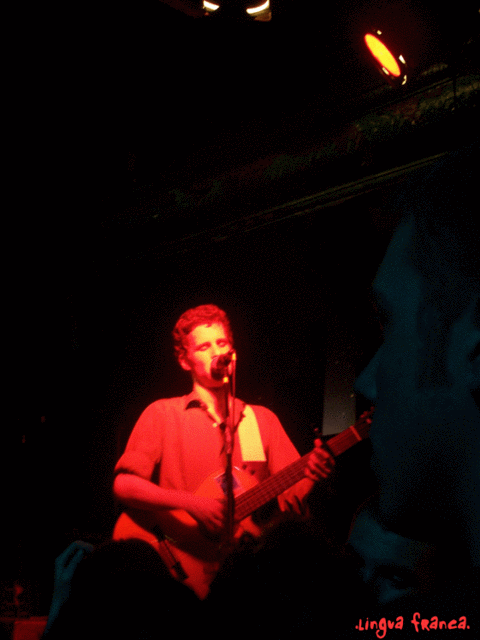
Lingua Franca
