= Pietro Chiodi =

Italian philosopher (1915–1970)

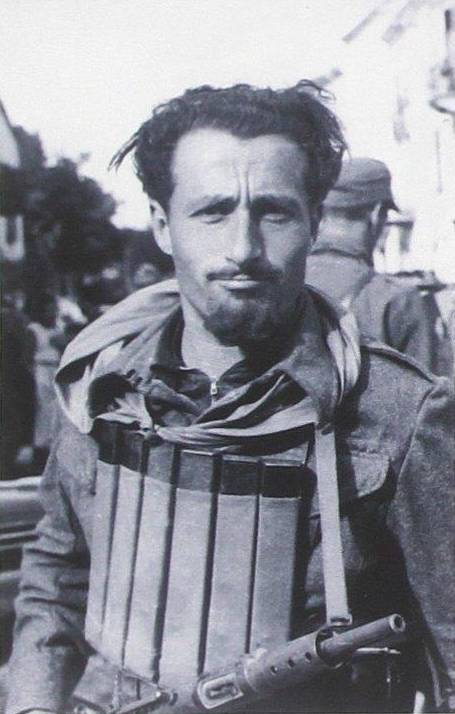
- Chiodi c. 1945
- Born: 2 July 1915; Corteno Golgi, Italy
- Died: 22 September 1970 (aged 55); Turin, Italy
- Occupation: Philosopher
- Known for: Essere e tempo

Pietro Chiodi (2 July 1915 – 22 September 1970), born in Corteno Golgi, was an Italian philosopher and anti-fascist partisan. He was the first Italian translator of Martin Heidegger's Being and Time. He died in Turin in 1970.

== Works ==
- L'esistenzialismo di Heidegger (1947)
- L'ultimo Heidegger (1952)
- Esistenzialismo e fenomenologia (1963)
