= Destroy Rebuild Until God Shows =

American post-hardcore band

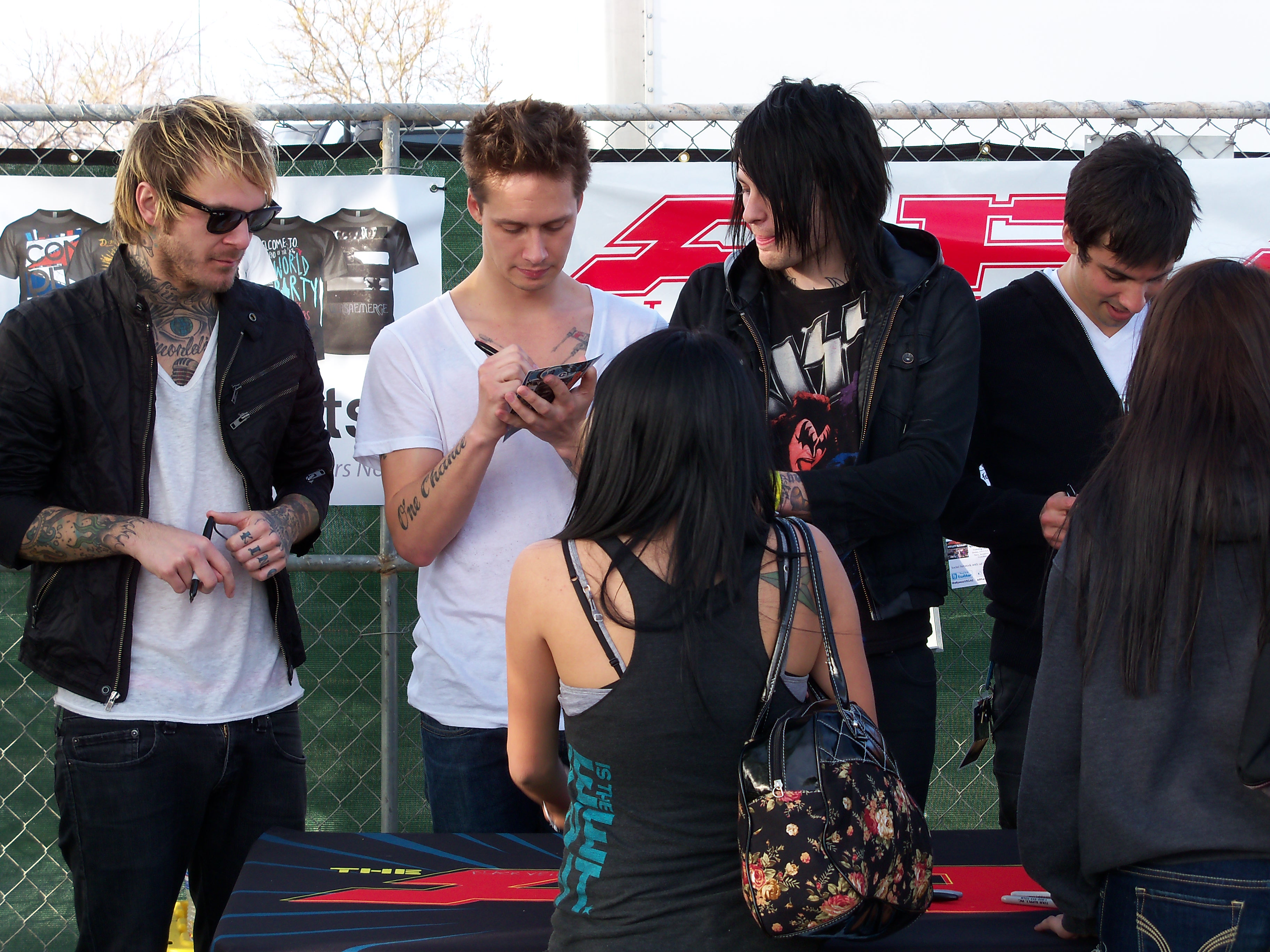
- Destroy Rebuild Until God Shows after performing in Las Vegas (2011); Left to right: Craig Owens, Adam Russell, Matt Good, and Aaron Stern.

Background information
- Also known as: D.R.U.G.S.
- Origin: Pontiac, Michigan, U.S.
- Genres: Post-hardcore; screamo; alternative rock; emo; metalcore
- Years active: 2010–2012; 2020–present
- Labels: Sire; Decaydance; Velocity; Equal Vision
- Spinoff of: Chiodos; From First to Last; Matchbook Romance; Story of the Year; Underminded
- Members: Craig Owens
- Past members: Matt Good; Nick Martin; Adam Russell; Aaron Stern

Destroy Rebuild Until God Shows (abbreviated as D.R.U.G.S.) is an American post-hardcore supergroup formed in 2010 in Pontiac, Michigan. They released their debut self-titled album on February 22, 2011. Craig Owens brought back the project in 2020 and released D.R.U.G.S.' second studio album Destroy Rebuild on June 17, 2022.

== History ==
=== Formation (2009–2010) ===
The band was formed in late 2009/early 2010, after Craig Owens was let go by Chiodos. The band's members were announced in several YouTube video updates on Craig Owens' official YouTube page. The band's members included vocalist Craig Owens (Chiodos), drummer Aaron Stern (Matchbook Romance), guitarist/vocalist Nick Martin (Underminded), guitarist/vocalist Matt Good (From First to Last), and bassist Adam Russell (Story of the Year).

=== Self-titled debut album, Live From Hot Topic EP (2010–2012) ===
On November 11, 2010, D.R.U.G.S. released their first song, "If You Think This Song Is About You, It Probably Is". On December 6, 2010, they released their second song, "Mr. Owl Ate My Metal Worm". This was followed by "Sex Life", released on January 18, 2011, which was the first single from the album.

On January 31, 2011, D.R.U.G.S. released their fourth song off of their self-titled album, "My Swagger Has a First Name" to all those who pre-ordered the album. The band's debut self-titled album was given a release date of February 22, 2011, through Decaydance/Sire Records.

The band headlined a 7-date tour of the UK between March 4–10, 2011, and headlined the Alternative Press Tour with Black Veil Brides and supporting acts VersaEmerge, Conditions and I See Stars, between March 18 – April 29, 2011.

D.R.U.G.S. played main stage on the 2011 Vans Warped Tour for the entirety of the tour, with the exceptions of July 17, 19 and 21. Vocalist Craig Owens stated that the band would not play those three dates due a prior commitment he made to be on set for the movie K-11. Owens also stated that D.R.U.G.S. would make up those three dates as well as give away merchandise and a special meet-and-greet and advised fans that were supposed to go those shows to keep their ticket stubs.

On July 12, 2011, D.R.U.G.S. released a live EP titled Live From Hot Topic, which includes 5 live songs: "The Only Thing You Talk About", "My Swagger has a First Name", "Mr. Owl Ate My Metal Worm", "Graveyard Dancing" and "If You Think This Song is About You, It Probably Is".

The band played the Counter Revolution tour in Australia, and played the WWIII tour with Asking Alexandria and Hollywood Undead in November.

On November 28, 2011 the band posted a previously unreleased b-side from their first album. The song is called "Rehab in Rifle Rounds" and was released as a one-year celebration. The band has recently parted ways with Warner Brothers and so they have parted ways with Decaydance. On January 16, 2012, a song titled "Scream If You're Crazy" was released on to Noisecreep.

On January 18, 2012 the band made this announcement: "It is with bittersweet sentiment that we announce some news today. Our bass player, Adam Russell, has made the personal decision to move on from Destroy Rebuild Until God Shows to pursue other opportunities. While we are happy to see him make a choice that will ultimately be best for him, of course, we are sad to see him go. Please know that we remain close friends and supporters of Adam, and that there are no hard feelings. Rest assured this will not affect our current tour schedule. Our close friend, Tai “Never Wrong, Always” Wright, will be filling in on bass duties on the upcoming SIN Tour which starts Thursday in Chicago."

The band completed their first headlining tour, the seven-week-long Strength In Numbers (S.I.N) Tour, along with a handful of DIY-style shows with opening acts Like Moths To Flames, Hit The Lights, Sparks The Rescue, and The Action Blast.

=== Break-up (2012) ===
On April 26, 2012, Chiodos released a video update hinting that Craig Owens had re-joined the band and replaced Brandon Bolmer, who joined the band after Owens was kicked out. The following day, Matt Good, Nick Martin, and Aaron Stern announced that they have decided to leave the band. It has been confirmed that Craig Owens decided to leave D.R.U.G.S. as well, thus leading the band towards a complete break up. This statement was released on the band's official website on April 27, 2012:

"To our loyal fans and friends,

After much thought and consideration we (Matt Good, Nick Martin and Aaron Stern) have decided to announce that we will be moving on from D.R.U.G.S. This decision has not been easy to make, and we want to express how grateful we are for all of you who have supported us and made this the incredible experience it has been over the past couple of years. We'll always look back on our time in this band with pride, and have no regrets about the music we've made or the people we've made it with. We want to thank everyone who has believed in us, and we hope you'll keep believing in us. We look forward to the future, and we know we'll be seeing you again soon, no matter where our paths lead next.

With love and gratitude,

Matt, Nick and Aaron."

After the departures of Good, Martin and Stern, vocalist Craig Owens had indeed re-joined Chiodos as their lead vocalist.

On August 24, 2012 it announced that Matt Good, Nick Martin, Adam Russell and Aaron Stern will be re-uniting without Owens. It was also announced that they're currently working on a new album with this new band with a current unknown name.

On August 30, 2012, Matt Good stated via Twitter that "People I have to clear some things up. No one is in DRUGS anymore except Craig. If he wants to keep going then that's his thing." Good later tweeted "But all the other sides minus Craig are gonna (write) some new music for y'all."

=== Reunion, Destroy Rebuild and Until God Shows (2020–present) ===
In February 2020, an Instagram account for the band was made and a VK page that leaked information about many upcoming songs, signalling a reunion of the band with Owens being the only founding member to return since their break up in 2012. In March 2020 Owens confirmed the possibility of upcoming tour dates on his Twitter account the following day new single was shared dubbed "King I Am" demo was released following a Forbes Magazine Q&A. In February 2021, the band announced they have signed to Velocity Records with a planned future album release.

On September 8, 2021, the band announced guitarist Jona Weinhofen, formerly of Bring Me the Horizon, Bleeding Through and I Killed the Prom Queen, was joining the group as their guitarist for upcoming tours. On December 15, 2021, the band announced that bassist and backing vocalist Aaron Patrick, formerly of All That Remains, Bury Your Dead and Devildriver, would be joining the group for touring duties as well.

On February 2, 2022, the band debuted their first single featured on their second album Destroy Rebuild titled "Destiny". The song was released through Velocity Records. On April 22, 2022, Aaron Stechauner was revealed to be the touring drummer.

On June 17, 2022 the band released their second album Destroy Rebuild.

On May 30, 2024 the band dropped a new song and music video, "Hunger Pangs". Craig would comment on the release and say "Hunger Pangs" is a song about an insatiable urge and unquenchable thirst for love. This song is both a new era and return to form for D.R.U.G.S.,". The song is from their third album Until God Shows, released on September 27, 2024.

== Band members ==
Current

- Craig Owens – lead vocals (2010–2012, 2020–present); programming (2020–present)

Former

- Matt Good – lead guitar, vocals, keyboards, programming (2010–2012); bass (2012)
- Nick Martin – rhythm guitar, backing vocals (2010–2012); bass (2012)
- Aaron Stern – drums, percussion (2010–2012)
- Adam Russell – bass, backing vocals (2010–2012)

Session and touring

- Tai Wright – bass (2012)
- Mitchell Rogers – guitars, bass, programming (2021–present on studio; 2023–present live)
- Michael McClellan – drums, percussion (2021)
- Jona Weinhofen – guitars (2021–2022)
- Aaron Patrick – bass (2022)
- Aaron Stechauner – drums, percussion (2022)
- Mike Foley – bass (2023)
- Sean Rauchut – drums, percussion (2023)
- Blake Hardman – guitar (2023–2024)
- Nick "Manny" Manzella – drums (2024)
- Anthony Salvaggio – bass (2024)
- Zach Allard – drums (2024)

Timeline

== Discography ==
Studio albums

Year	Album	Label	Chart peaks		
Year	Album	Label	US 200	US Hard Rock	US Digital
2011	D.R.U.G.S.	Sire/Decaydance	29	1	14
2022	Destroy Rebuild	Velocity/Equal Vision	—	—	—
2024	Until God Shows	Velocity/Equal Vision	—	—	—

Extended plays

Year	Album	Label
2011	Live from Hot Topic	Decaydance

=== Music videos ===
Year	Song	Album
2010	"If You Think This Song Is About You, It Probably Is"	D.R.U.G.S.
2011	"Sex Life"	D.R.U.G.S.
2022	"Destiny"	Destroy Rebuild
2022	"Satellites in Motion"	Destroy Rebuild
2022	"Brighter Side"	Destroy Rebuild
2022	"Outcasts vs. Everyone"	Destroy Rebuild
2022	"Gold"	Destroy Rebuild
2022	"The Longest Road"	Destroy Rebuild
2024	"Hunger Pangs"	Until God Shows
2024	"Losers Stay Losers (Let-down)"	Until God Shows

== Tours ==
- The Velocity Records Tour (headliner, w/ Scary Kids Scaring Kids, Secrets, Dead American & Glasslands) - 2022
- Crown The Empire: The Fallout 10 Year Anniversary Tour - 2022
- DESTROY. REBUILD. TOUR. (headliner, w/ Varials, The Callous Daoboys & 156/Silence) - 2023
- Escape The Fate: The Dead Masquerade Australian Tour - 2023
- UNTIL GOD SHOWS TOUR. (headliner, w/ Savage Hands, Downswing & The Requiem) - 2024
