= Underminded =

American hardcore/metalcore band

- Origin: San Diego, California, U.S.
- Genres: Metalcore; hardcore punk
- Years active: 1999–present
- Labels: Kung Fu; Uprising
- Spinoffs: Scary Kids Scaring Kids; Sleeping with Sirens; Destroy Rebuild Until God Shows; In Flames
- Spinoff of: Pierce the Veil
- Members: Nick Martin; Matt Johnson; Brandon Cardwell; Tanner Wayne
- Past members: Matty O'Connell; Chris Copley; Joe Mullen; Wade Youman; Richie Ochoa; Christopher Swinney; Mike Fuentes

Underminded is an American hardcore punk band from San Diego, California. The band has been on hiatus since 2007 as its members concentrate on other projects. Frontman Nick Martin was in Destroy Rebuild Until God Shows, and has been in Sleeping With Sirens since originally filling in for them in 2013. Drummer Tanner Wayne has been the drummer for In Flames since 2018.

== History ==
Band members Nick Martin and Matt Johnson met while classmates at a Catholic school, and formed the band together in 1999. They were encouraged to tour by Buck-O-Nine singer Jon Pebsworth very early in their career. Their debut album, Hail Unamerican, appeared in 2004. Following the release of the album, the band played the entire 2004 Warped Tour. A follow-up album, Eleven Eleven, was planned for release in 2006 but was actually issued in 2007. Paul Miner produced the album. The group toured with Chiodos, Scary Kids Scaring Kids, Emery, and The Devil Wears Prada following the release of the album.

Lead singer Nick Martin was part of the live back banding for Chiodos lead singer Craig Owens. He was part of the super-group Isles & Glaciers, and played guitar in the now-defunct Cinematic Sunrise. He did two guest spots for Chiodos' 2007 record Bone Palace Ballet, as well as toured with them for the Vans Warped Tour 2009. He was the first of two guitarists announced for Craig Owens' band Destroy Rebuild Until God Shows.

Tanner Wayne acted as fill-in drummer for Scary Kids Scaring Kids and Underoath during the Vans Warped Tour 2009. He played drums for Chiodos between 2010 and 2012.

== Band members ==
Current

- Nick Martin - lead vocals, guitars (since 1999)
- Matt "Yabbs" Johnson - guitars, backing vocals (since 1999)
- Brandon Cardwell - bass guitar, backing vocals (since 2000)
- Tanner Wayne - drums, percussion (since 2006)

Former

- Matty O' Connell - guitar (Currently plays in Unfeigned)
- Christopher Swinney – bass (Later played in The Ataris. Currently plays in Fire Sale)
- Wade Youman - drums (Previously played in Unwritten Law)
- Chris Copley - bass guitar
- Joe Mullen - drums (Currently plays in Endless Hallway)
- Richie Ochoa - guitar
- Mike Fuentes - drums (Later played in Pierce the Veil)

== Discography ==
- The Task of the Modern Educator EP (2003)
- Hail Unamerican! (Kung Fu Records, 2004)
- Eleven:Eleven (Uprising Records, 2007)
