= Nick Martin (musician) =

American musician (born 1982)

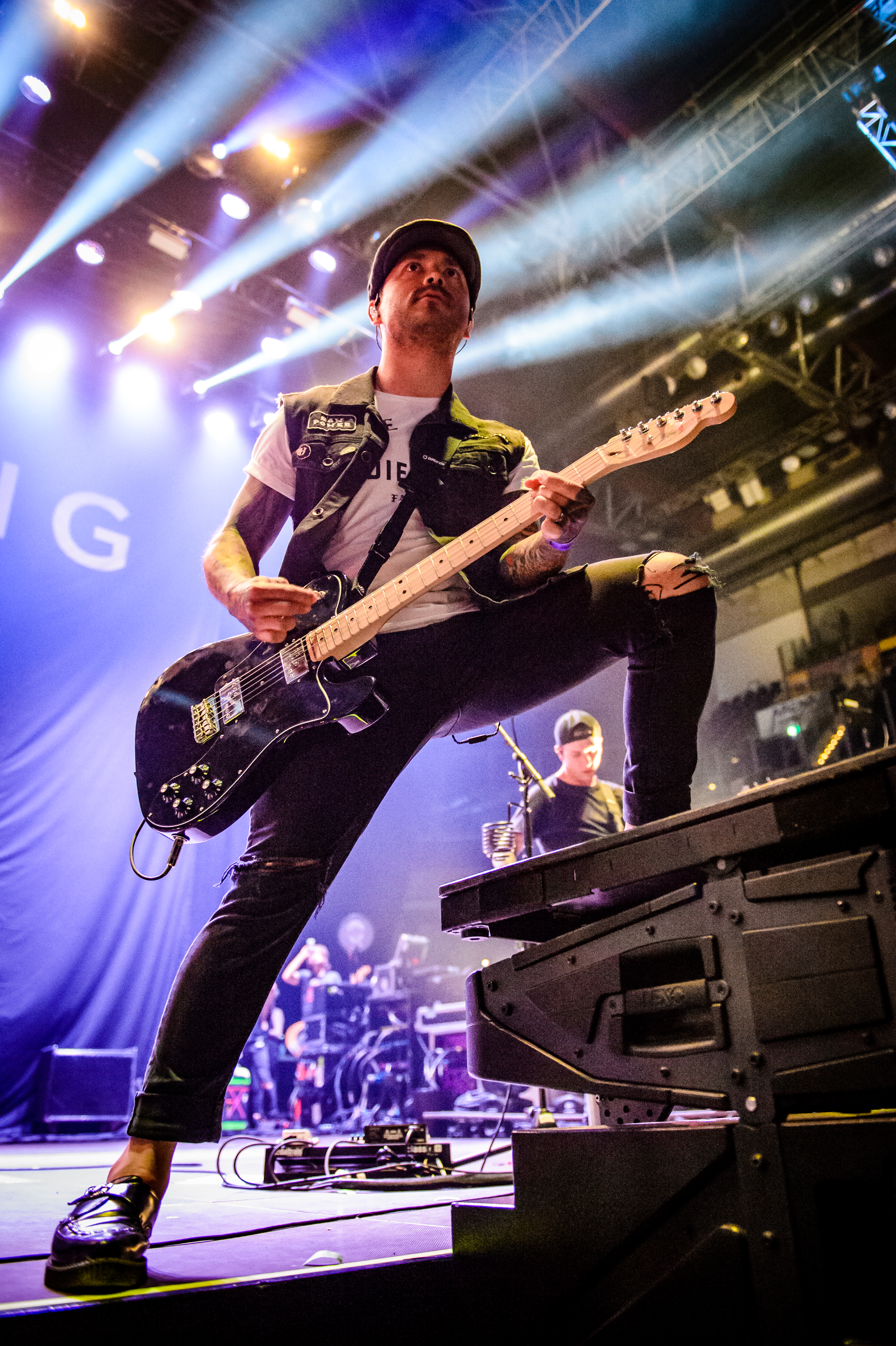
- Nick Martin with Sleeping with Sirens at Rock im Park, 2017.

Background information
- Born: Nicholas Anthony Martin; December 10, 1982 (age 43); San Diego, California, U.S
- Genres: Post-hardcore; pop-punk; experimental rock; emo; alternative rock; metalcore; mathcore; hardcore punk; screamo; indie rock
- Occupations: Singer; songwriter; musician
- Instruments: Vocals; guitar
- Years active: 1999–present
- Member of: Underminded; Sleeping with Sirens
- Formerly of: Isles & Glaciers; Cinematic Sunrise; Destroy Rebuild Until God Shows

Nicholas Anthony Martin (born December 10, 1982) is an American musician. He is best known for being the rhythm guitarist and backing vocalist of the rock band Sleeping with Sirens since 2013. He was the lead vocalist and guitarist for the band Underminded. He was formerly the guitarist of Isles & Glaciers, Cinematic Sunrise, and Destroy Rebuild Until God Shows

== Early life ==
Nick Martin was born on December 10, 1982, in San Diego, California, and spent his entire childhood in the city. He is a distant cousin of Vic and Mike Fuentes.

Martin has described his upbringing as one filled with music, with his father having a large collection of vinyl records that were often played at home. His father introduced Martin to a wide repertoire of music: classical music, rock, and punk. Martin's Spanish-speaking mother gave him influences from mariachi music and cumbia.

== Career ==
Martin founded his first band when he was in eighth grade. He is the founder of the hardcore punk band Underminded, with whom he has released one EP and two albums. He was also a member of the short-lived supergroup Isles & Glaciers and the Chiodos side project Cinematic Sunrise, with each of which he released an EP. Between 2010 and 2012, Martin was in the band D.R.U.G.S. active. The group disbanded after Owens returned to Chiodos.

Martin also appeared as a session musician with Slick Shoes and Norma Jean. He was initially a session musician with Sleeping with Sirens but later became a permanent band member.

== Discography ==
Underminded

- 2003: The Task of the Modern Educator (EP, own production)
- 2004: Hail Unamerican! (Kung Fu Records)
- 2007: Eleven:Eleven (Uprising Records)

Cinematic Sunrise

- 2008: A Coloring Storybook and Long-Playing Record (EP, Equal Vision Records)

Isles & Glaciers

- 2010: The Hearts of Lonely People (EP, Equal Vision Records)

with D.R.U.G.S.

- 2011: D.R.U.G.S. (Sire Records, Decaydance Records)

with Sleeping with Sirens

- 2015: Madness (Epitaph Records)
- 2017: Gossip (Warner Bros. Records)
- 2019: How It Feels to Be Lost (Sumerian Records)
- 2022: Complete Collapse (Sumerian Records)
