= Craig Owens =

American musician (born 1984)

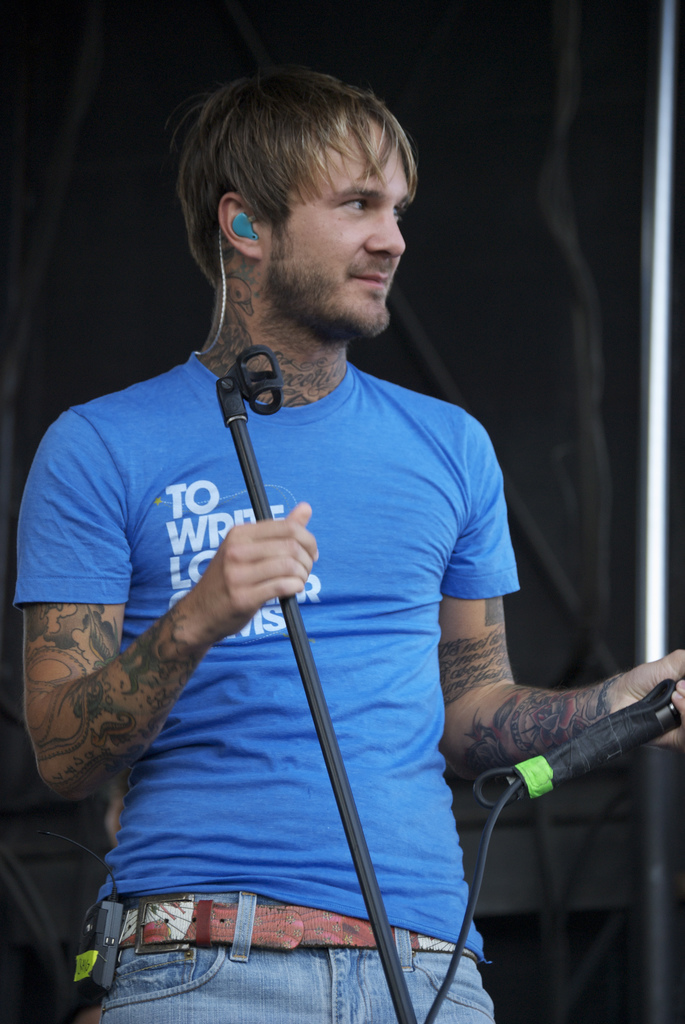
- Craig Owens performing in 2009

Background information
- Also known as: badXchannels
- Born: Craigery Owens; August 26, 1984 (age 41)
- Origin: Davison, Michigan, U.S.
- Genres: Post-hardcore; pop-punk; experimental rock; emo; progressive rock; screamo; Alternative R&B; electronic; alternative rock; art rock
- Occupations: Singer-songwriter; musician; producer; actor
- Instruments: Vocals; guitar; piano
- Years active: 2001–present
- Member of: Destroy Rebuild Until God Shows; Chiodos
- Formerly of: Isles & Glaciers; The Sound of Animals Fighting; Cinematic Sunrise

Craigery "Craig" Owens (born August 26, 1984) is an American musician best known as the lead vocalist of Chiodos. He has also had an involvement in various projects such as Cinematic Sunrise, The Sound of Animals Fighting, Isles & Glaciers, and Destroy Rebuild Until God Shows. He has recorded as a solo artist, is an established music producer, has written and recorded with the likes of Dr. Dre, and has also acted in the 2012 film K-11.

Owens sings in the tenor vocal range.

He currently performs under the stage name badXchannels.

== Career ==
=== Chiodos ===
In 2001, Owens joined Bradley Bell, Pat McManaman, Jason Hale, Matt Goddard and Derrick Frost to form a band in Davison, Michigan. Originally named "Chiodos Bros." in tribute to special effects trio the Chiodo Brothers, the band recorded its first demo in June 2002. Following several years of national touring and independent recording, they were signed by Equal Vision Records in 2004 and, under the name Chiodos, released their first full-length album, All's Well That Ends Well in 2005. They continued thereafter, recording and touring.

Even after his separation from his first band, Owens continued to have an interest in working with them and, after being asked by his management about what project he most wanted to pursue, he made overtures about a possible return to Chiodos. On April 26, 2012, Owens announced his return to Chiodos. Subsequently, on April 27, the remaining members of D.R.U.G.S. revealed their intention to disband. Chiodos' first live appearance after their reunion took place on August 9, 2012, in a sold-out performance at Flint Local 432 in Michigan. As of that date, the members had tentative plans for a new album, on which they have been working separately but not yet begun to coordinate.

On November 1, 2016, in an interview with Billboard, vocalist Craig Owens stated in regards to Chiodos that, "It's done, it just couldn't stay afloat. There were just kind of, not necessarily bad vibes, but we came to the realization that we can't do it full-time. I think it just stopped becoming a passion for most of us so we said, 'Alright, let's stop." Thus bringing an end to Chiodos' fifteen-year career.

After reforming in late 2023 with Owens as the only original member, Chiodos performed at high-profile festivals including When We Were Young in October 2024, the Emo's Not Dead cruise in February of 2024 and continued live appearances into 2025 including all the Vans Warped Tour dates as well as another appearance at When We Were Young in October of 2025. The band’s All’s Well That Ends Well 20th Anniversary Tour featured extensive U.S. dates with support from acts such as Hawthorne Heights, Emmure, Big Ass Truck, Holywatr, and The Callous Daoboys. The tour has drawn attention for blending early 2000s post-hardcore nostalgia with updated live arrangements, and continued through additional legs into late 2025 and scheduled appearances in 2026, including festival bookings such as Sonic Temple Art & Music Festival, as well as Louder than Life Music Fesitval in Sept 2026.

=== The Sound of Animals Fighting ===
Owens featured as vocalist in the supergroup, the Sound of Animals Fighting. Owens featured on the album Lover, the Lord Has Left Us... released in 2006. The group consisted of project members of Circa Survive, Finch, Rx Bandits, Days Away each member of the group wore an animal mask to hide their personas to influence the groups creativeness, Owens is identified in the group as the Ram. Owens appeared in the groups live line up We Must Become the Change We Want to See in 2006 along with 11 other members.

=== Cinematic Sunrise ===
During this work with Chiodos, Owens and Bell formed the side project Cinematic Sunrise as a place to perform music that didn't fit Chiodos' style. When the band signed with Equal Vision, in March 2008, its line-up had included Owens, Bell, Bryan Beeler, Marcus Vankirk and Dave Shapiro. Cinematic Sunrise released an EP later that Spring, A Coloring Storybook and Long Playing Record.

=== Isles & Glaciers ===
In September 2008, Owens revealed to fans on his journal that in addition to several guest vocalist appearances, he was working on another side project with Jonny Craig of Emarosa/Dance Gavin Dance, Vic Fuentes of Pierce the Veil and Nick Martin of Cinematic Sunrise. When the Isles & Glaciers supergroup was officially announced in December, it also included Owens' bandmate Matt Goddard, Fuentes' brother and bandmate Mike Fuentes and Brian Southall from the band TREOS.

The supergroup premiered their first songs during a radio interview on January 18, 2009. The band's EP, The Hearts of Lonely People, was released on March 9, 2010.

Asked in March 2012 if Isles & Glaciers would consider further collaboration, Owens indicated that the possibility had been discussed among various members of the group but not established; "we've tossed the idea around to see if we could put it back together, but that was just to see if we could do anything...there's no set plans right now."

=== Destroy Rebuild Until God Shows ===
On September 15, 2009, Owens released a solo EP, "Με την αγάπη (With Love)", through Equal Vision Records. Nine days later, on September 24, 2009, Chiodos announced that they had parted ways with Craig Owens, announcing that the decision to "let Craig Owens go as the singer of Chiodos...was a necessary one", but refusing to disclose details "[o]ut of respect for all of the hard work that we have put in together for all of these years". For the next several months, Owens maintained a low profile, taking personal time and writing songs.

In June 2010, at the time he discussed his upcoming project with Alternative Press, he had written or co-written 30 songs for a not-yet-completed supergroup signed to Decaydance featuring Nick Martin of Cinematic Sunrise and Aaron Stern of Matchbook Romance. On August 17, Owens announced via Twitter that the new band would be named D.R.U.G.S. (Destroy Rebuild Until God Shows). On February 21, 2011, with the completed band lineup including Matt Good of From First to Last and Adam Russell of Story of the Year and production by John Feldmann, D.R.U.G.S. released their eponymous debut. The album reached No. 29 on Billboard 200 and higher on some of Billboard's specialized lists, including hitting No. 6 on Top Rock Albums, No. 5 on Modern Rock/Alternative Albums and No. 1 on Hard Rock Albums. D.R.U.G.S. coheadlined the 2011 Alternative Press Tour.

=== Bea5t ===
In February 2016, Craig released a short grindcore EP entitled Empathy Is A Gift under the moniker of Bea5t, downloadable from his bandcamp page.

=== badXchannels ===
After the end of Chiodos, Craig began releasing music under the moniker badXchannels. An extended play was released at the end of 2016 with two more stand-alone songs released in early 2017. These songs were later grouped into an EP known as Transmissions, freely available to subscribers of his mailing list.

Craig Owens collaborated with The Frst on the track “Love In 3D,” released on 1 November 2024.

== Discography ==
=== Albums ===
==== Studio albums ====
Year	Album details
2009	With Love: Released: September 15, 2009; Label: Equal Vision Records; Format: CD, digital download
2016	Las Vegas Sessions: Released: February 9, 2016; Label: Cheer Up Kid! Records; Format: digital download

==== Featured albums ====
Year	Album details
2012	Punk Goes Pop 5: Released: November 6, 2012; Label: Fearless Records; Format: CD, digital download

=== Singles ===
Year	Single	Album
2011	"Bibles and Badges"	Non-album single
2015	"Fragile" (featuring Brad Bell)	Non-album single

=== Featured appearances ===
Year	Single	Album
2006	"Un'aria" (The Sound of Animals Fighting featuring Craig Owens)	Lover, the Lord Has Left Us...
2006	"Horses in the Sky" (The Sound of Animals Fighting featuring Craig Owens)	Lover, the Lord Has Left Us...
2006	"Un'aria Ancora" (The Sound of Animals Fighting featuring Craig Owens)	Lover, the Lord Has Left Us...
2007	"You Can't Spell Crap Without 'C'" (The Devil Wears Prada featuring Craig Owens)	Plagues
2008	"Bitter Sweet Symphony" (Ace Enders featuring Mark Hoppus, Aaron Marsh, Craig Owens, Alex Gaskarth, Bryce Avary, Kenny Vasoli, Matt Thiessen, and Duane Okun)	Non-album single
2009	"The Road to Hell is Paved With Good Intentions" (In Fear and Faith featuring Craig Owens)	Your World on Fire
2009	"Same Thing We Do Everyday Pinky" (Broadway featuring Craig Owens)	Kingdoms
2009	"Fallen Angel" (MxPx featuring Craig Owens and Stephen Egerton)	On the Cover II
2011	"The Road to Hell is Paved With Good Intentions" (In Fear and Faith featuring Craig Owens)	Symphonies (EP)
2011	"Everything" (Jon Connor featuring Craig Owens and Josh Holleman)	While You Were Sleeping
2012	"Standing In The Sun" (Jon Connor featuring Craig Owens and Lia Mack)	Season 2
2014	"Developing Negative" (The Color Morale featuring Craig Owens)	Hold On Pain Ends
2015	"The Heart Wants What It Wants" (Selena Gomez cover) (Our Last Night featuring Craig Owens)	The Heart Wants What It Wants - Single
2015	"One Shot One Kill" (Dr. Dre Jon Connor featuring Snoop Dogg and Craig Owens)	Compton The Soundtrack
2019	"Life Long After Death" (Adventure Club and Quix featuring BadXchannels)	—
2020	"Hand Crushed by a Mallet" (100 gecs featuring Fall Out Boy, Craig Owens, and Nicole Dollanganger)	1000 Gecs and the Tree of Clues
2024	"Wants I Need" (156/Silence featuring Craig Owens)	People Watching
