= Chiodos =

American post-hardcore band

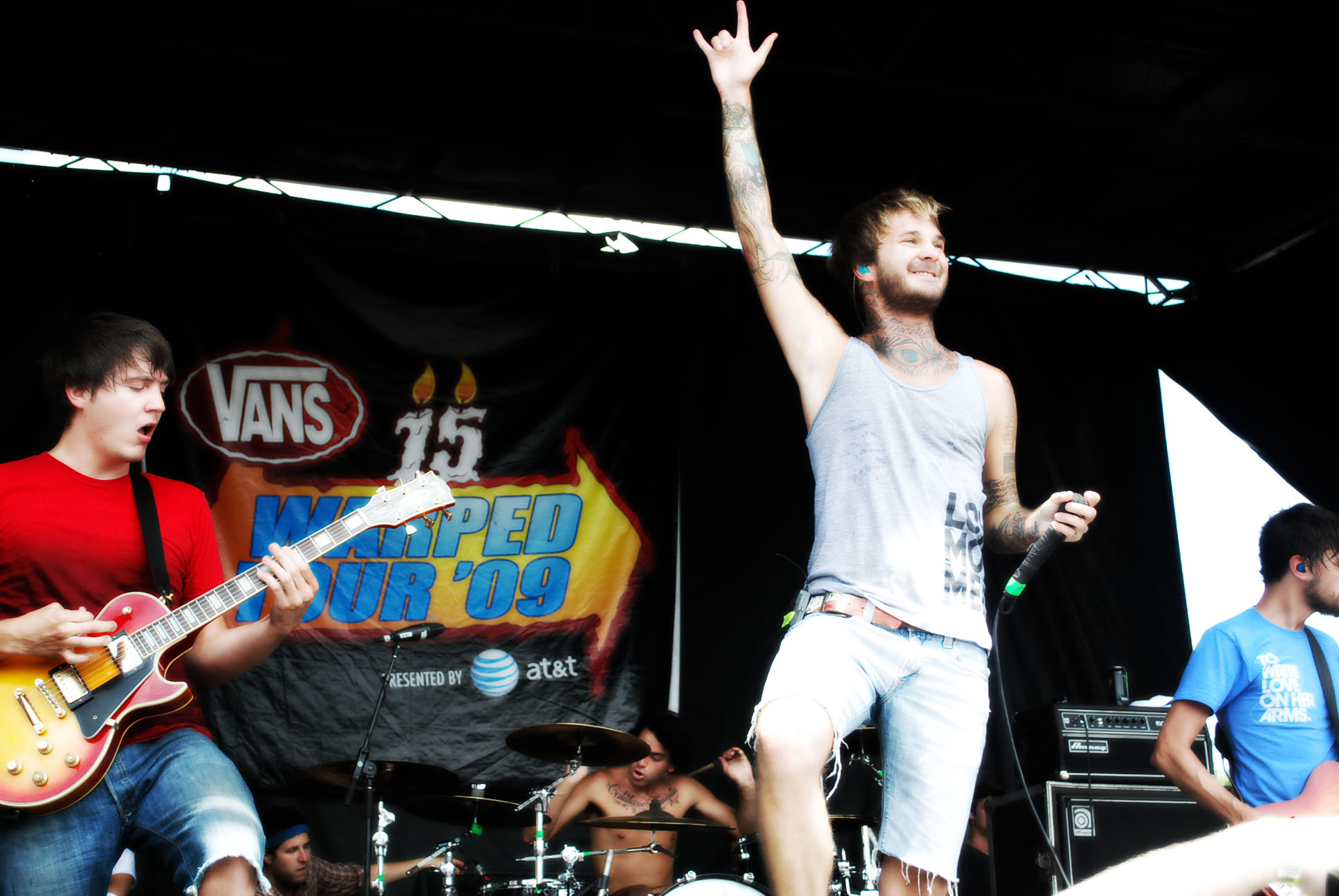
- Chiodos performing at Warped Tour in 2009

Background information
- Origin: Davison, Michigan, U.S.
- Genres: Post-hardcore; pop-punk; experimental rock; emo; progressive rock; screamo
- Years active: 2001–2016; 2024–present
- Labels: SharpTone; Sumerian; Razor & Tie; Equal Vision
- Spinoffs: The Sound of Animals Fighting; Cinematic Sunrise; Isles & Glaciers; Destroy Rebuild Until God Shows
- Members: Craig Owens; Mitch Rogers; Nick Ventimiglia; Nick Clemenson; Simon Martinez
- Past members: See former members

Chiodos (English: /tʃiːˈoʊdoʊz/, Italian pronunciation: [ˈkjɔːdos]) is an American post-hardcore band from Davison, Michigan. Formed in 2001, the group was originally known as "The Chiodos Bros," the band's name was a tribute to filmmakers Stephen, Charles, and Edward Chiodo, responsible for the film Killer Klowns from Outer Space. Chiodos released their first full-length album, titled All's Well That Ends Well, on July 26, 2005. Their second album, Bone Palace Ballet, was released in North America on September 4, 2007 and debuted at number 5 on the Billboard 200 and number 1 on the Independent Albums. Warner Bros. Records released Bone Palace Ballet on January 26, 2009, as part of a new distribution deal in the UK. They released their third studio album, Illuminaudio in 2010, and it was the only studio album to feature Brandon Bolmer as lead vocalist and Tanner Wayne as drummer. The band released their fourth album, Devil on April 1, 2014, which marked the return of original vocalist Craig Owens and drummer Derrick Frost.

== History ==
=== Inception and All's Well That Ends Well (2001–2005) ===
The original members of Chiodos assembled (under the name The Chiodos Brothers) while attending high school in their hometown of Davison, Michigan during 2001. Initially, they got their start playing shows at the Flint Local 432, an all-ages, substance free music venue located in downtown Flint, Michigan. The Flint Local 432 also helped develop other nationally recognized alternative acts such as The Swellers, and Empty Orchestra. The group changed their name the following years to Chiodos after releasing three EPs, one for each year until the coming of 2004 when the writing and preparation of their debut album, All's Well That Ends Well began. The debut record was released on July 26, 2005 through Equal Vision Records. It reached number 3 on the Billboard Top Heatseekers chart and number 164 on the Billboard 200 chart upon its release.

=== Bone Palace Ballet and departure of Craig Owens (2006–2009) ===
Chiodos headlined some shows on their own before joining Alternative Press's 2006 "Invisible Sideshow" tour, headlined by Armor for Sleep. Following that tour, they supported Matchbook Romance on the Sub City "Take Action" tour in Spring 2006. That summer, they toured with Fear Before the March of Flames, as well as appearing on the Warped Tour. In fall 2006, Chiodos appeared on Atreyu's World Championship Tour, alongside From First to Last and Every Time I Die, as well as 3 and 36 Crazyfists. Chiodos toured alongside Linkin Park and Coheed and Cambria in early 2008. The band also toured with Nine Inch Nails and Alice in Chains in Australia during early 2009. They played Warped Tour 2009 on the main stage alongside bands The Devil Wears Prada, Bad Religion, Silverstein, Saosin and Underoath. In March 2009, the band recorded a cover version of the song "Flagpole Sitta" by Harvey Danger for Fearless Records' Punk Goes Pop Volume 2 compilation album.

On September 24, 2009 the band announced on their MySpace page that they had "let go" of lead singer, Craig Owens.

To all of our friends, family, and fans: We would like to let you know that we have let Craig Owens go as the singer of Chiodos. This decision was a necessary one. Out of respect for all of the hard work that we have put in together for all of these years we will not be discussing the specific reasons that this needed to happen. We wish Craig well. We will absolutely be continuing on as a band and we will keep you informed as this next chapter unfolds. Chiodos fans are the best fans in the world and all we can ask of you, after everything you have already given us, is to share in our excitement for this next album. We promise you will not be disappointed............Brad, Jason, Pat, and Matt

People close to the band were apparently aware of the tension and acrimony between Owens and the other members but, in the days following this announcement, expressed both surprise at the firing, and curiosity about how Chiodos would proceed without Owens as the "face of the band."

=== Line-up change and Illuminaudio (2010–2012) ===
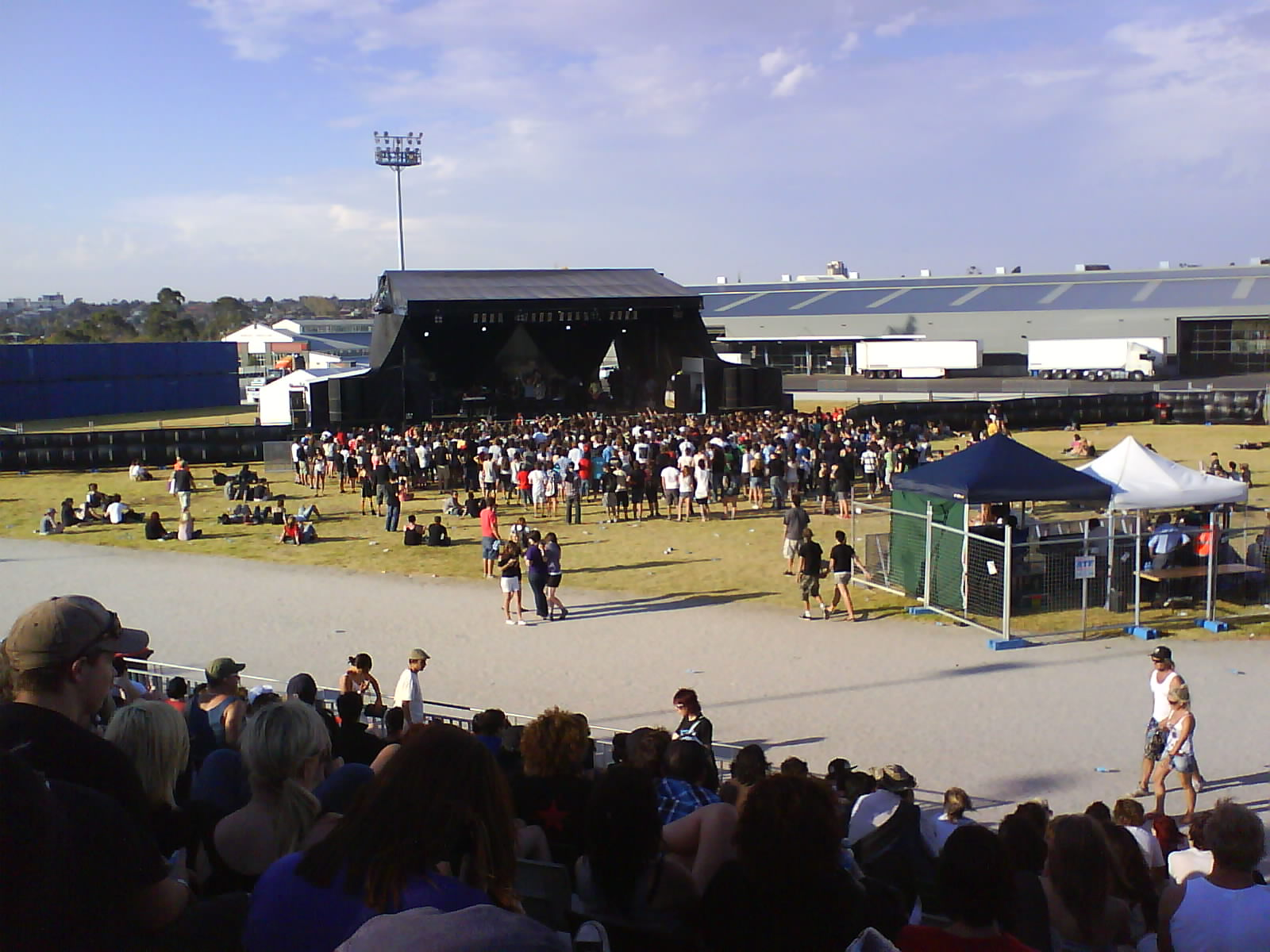
Chiodos performing at Australian music festival, Soundwave, in Melbourne, 2009.

On February 1, 2010, the band announced that they were set to record their third album with acclaimed producer, Machine, that month. "Entering the studio with Bell will be members Jason Hale (guitar), Pat McManaman (guitar), Matt Goddard (bass), and a recently added drummer, Tanner Wayne (ex-Underminded, ex-Scary Kids Scaring Kids).

The band planned to keep the identity of their new vocalist a secret until their performance at Bamboozle left, but on February 2, 2010 Alternative Press reported that former Yesterdays Rising singer Brandon Bolmer was the new vocalist. Bolmer later revealed to AP that he was the new Chiodos vocalist and he would no longer be a part of Yesterdays Rising.

In the May issue of Alternative Press the band stated they and Derrick Frost parted ways at the time due to his and Craig Owens inability to get along. The band let Frost go over Owens, and only months later let Owens go. They also stated they had considered bringing Frost back.

On June 9, 2010 a demo featuring Owens on vocals was leaked onto the internet, named "Thermacare". The demo was recorded in September, just before Owens parted ways from the band. The band released a version of this song on their new CD "Illuminaudio" renaming it "Stratovolcano Mouth", which features only the music portion of "Thermacare". Owens' band, D.R.U.G.S. released their version on their self-titled debut album. It features Owens's lyrics with new music, and is renamed "The Only Thing You Talk About"

On August 3, 2010, Alternative Press posted on their website that Chiodos' new album would be titled Illuminaudio, and would be released on October 5. This was confirmed on August 9, 2010, in a press release from their label, Equal Vision. On January 21, 2011, the Australian version of "Illuminaudio" CD was released with a bonus track, "New Thought Movement". In 2011 Chiodos toured with Skindred to promote the Welsh ragga metallers' new album, Union Black. This was followed by four American dates with The Color Morale, Close to Home and The Air I Breathe and the "Scream It Like You Mean It" tour 2011, a 39 date American tour which saw the band play directly underneath Breathe Carolina, with I See Stars, The Color Morale, MOD SUN and The Air I Breathe also on the bill.

=== Second line-up change (2012–2013) ===
On March 27, 2012 Chiodos announced that vocalist Brandon Bolmer and drummer Tanner Wayne had decided to depart from the band. On April 26, 2012, Chiodos released a video confirming that Craig Owens would be a part of Chiodos again for the first time in two and a half years. On May 14, 2012, Chiodos released another video confirming that Derrick Frost would be a part of Chiodos again after years of being away.

On November 8, 2012, while performing solo Owens and Bell both stated that they were writing a new Chiodos record. On November 23, 2012, Jason Hale announced that he was no longer a member of Chiodos. Thomas Erak, of The Fall of Troy, replaced Jason for the remainder of the tour, and was soon after announced as a permanent replacement. The band toured the UK in February 2013 on the Kerrang! Tour 2013, as support to Black Veil Brides and featured on the Warped Tour 2013.

=== Signing to Razor & Tie, Devil and break-up (2013–2016) ===
On May 15, 2013, Razor & Tie announced their signing of Chiodos. On June 21, 2013, during their run at Warped Tour in Pomona with The Fall of Troy, they announced they would start recording their fourth album upon completing their tour. On September 11, 2013, the band entered Dreamland Studio in Woodstock, NY with producer David Bottrill. Vocalist Craig Owens commented on the production of the new album: "For the next two months, we'll be hiding out in the woods of upstate NY, in a hollowed-out church turned studio".

On September 25, 2013, Alternative Press released in an interview with Bradley Bell on what to expect on the new album. In the interview, Bell stated that the album would be "...touching back toward the Bone Palace roots, but Thomas kind of brings us an All's Well That Ends Well vibe with his playing. And then, there’s a new frontier that we’re exploring, as well." Bell also mentioned how the band had been working outside of their comfort zone, with Owens "...challenging himself on this record to sing in different ways. He’s been working on using his actual falsetto a lot instead of screaming his high notes just to bring it to a new dimension. He’s even singing lower on a lot of stuff than he has in the past."

They incorporated a new song into a mini-documantary shared on YouTube, The Road To Warped Tour 2013, titled "Behvis Bullock." At the end of 2013, the band planned to tour Germany supporting Escape The Fate; however, the tour was cancelled at short notice, with Chiodos playing some headlining gigs instead. On January 27 the following year the album was announced as Devil, and was set for release on April 1, 2014 through Razor & Tie. On the same day, the first single from the album, "Ole Fishlips Is Dead Now" was released. The band was set as a support act for A Day to Remember's Parks & Devastation tour throughout September and October, while they also supported The Blackout in the UK throughout November.

On September 3, members Derrick Frost and Matt Goddard announced that they had decided to leave the band and were immediately replaced by Thomas Pridgen (ex-The Mars Volta) on drums and Joseph Troy (Rx Bandits) on bass. The band was announced as one of the acts to perform in the South by So What?! festival in March at QuikTrip Park in Grand Prairie. On December 9, 2014 Thomas Erak announced that he would be departing in order to focus on The Fall of Troy.

On November 1, 2016 in an interview with Billboard, Owens confirmed that Chiodos was "done", noting: "It just couldn't stay afloat [...] we came to the realization that we can't do it full-time. I think it just stopped becoming a passion for most of us so we said, 'Alright, let's stop.'"

=== Owens-led reunion (2024–present) ===
It was confirmed on November 13, 2023 that Chiodos would play at the When We Were Young Festival in Las Vegas on October 19, 2024. No other original members were involved in the reunion, with Owens assembling a new line-up from members of Destroy Rebuild Until God Shows and Frail Body to perform. Bradley Bell would later confirm that the previous members of the band were "never informed" about Owens' plans to continue Chiodos without them.

Following the festival set, the band were enlisted to perform on the Emo's Not Dead cruise in February 2025, as well as the Louder Than Life Festival and select dates of the Vans Warped Tour. On November 6, 2024, Chiodos announced a 20th anniversary tour of All's Well That Ends Well, in which the album was performed in its entirety, with support from Hawthorne Heights, Emmure, Holy Water, Big Ass Truck, and The Callous Daoboys.. On July 25th, 2025, a re-recorded 20th anniversary edition of All's Well That Ends Well was released to coincide with the anniversary of the original release.

In February 2026, the band was announced as part of the lineup for the Louder Than Life music festival in Louisville, scheduled to take place in September.

On July 21, 2026, the band released a new single, "Tapdat", their first new music in 12 years following their break-up in 2016 until their return in 2024, and their first after signing with a new record label, SharpTone Records.

On July 30th, the band embarked on the "It’s Not You, It’s Me" tour. The first half of the tour based on songs from the band’s first album, All’s Well That Ends Well, and the second half is hits from the band. During these shows, Owens announced a new Chiodos album was finished being written and would be recorded at the end of the tour.

== Band members ==
Current

- Craig Owens – lead vocals (2001–2009, 2012–2016, 2024–present)
- Mitch Rogers – keyboards, backing vocals (2024–present), rhythm guitar (2025–present), lead guitar (2024–2025)
- Nick Ventimiglia – bass (2024–present)
- Nick Clemenson – drums (2024–present)
- Simon Martinez — lead guitar (2025–present)

Former

- Pat McManaman – rhythm guitar (2002–2016); bass (2001–2002, 2015–2016)
- Bradley Bell – piano, keyboards, synthesizer, programming, backing vocals (2001–2016)
- Matt Goddard – bass (2002–2014), rhythm guitar (2002)
- Dane Spencer – lead guitar (2001–2002)
- Crosby Clark – drums (2001–2004)
- Chip Kelly – lead guitar (2002–2004)
- Jason Hale – lead guitar (2004–2012)
- Derrick Frost – drums, percussion (2004–2009, 2012–2014)
- Mike Catalano – drums, percussion (2009–2010)
- Tanner Wayne – drums, percussion (2010–2012)
- Brandon Bolmer – lead vocals (2010–2012)
- Sergio Medina – lead guitar (2014,2025-2026)
- Thomas Erak – lead guitar, backing vocals (2012–2015)
- Joseph Arrington – drums, percussion (2014–2016)
- Joseph Troy – bass (2014–2015)
- Thomas Pridgen – drums, percussion (2014)
- Chad Crawford – lead guitar, bass (2015–2016)
- Blake Hardman – rhythm guitar, backing vocals (2024–2025)

Timeline

== Discography ==
Studio albums

- All's Well That Ends Well (2005)
- Bone Palace Ballet (2007)
- Illuminaudio (2010)
- Devil (2014)
