= K.Flay discography =

Discography of the American singer and rapper

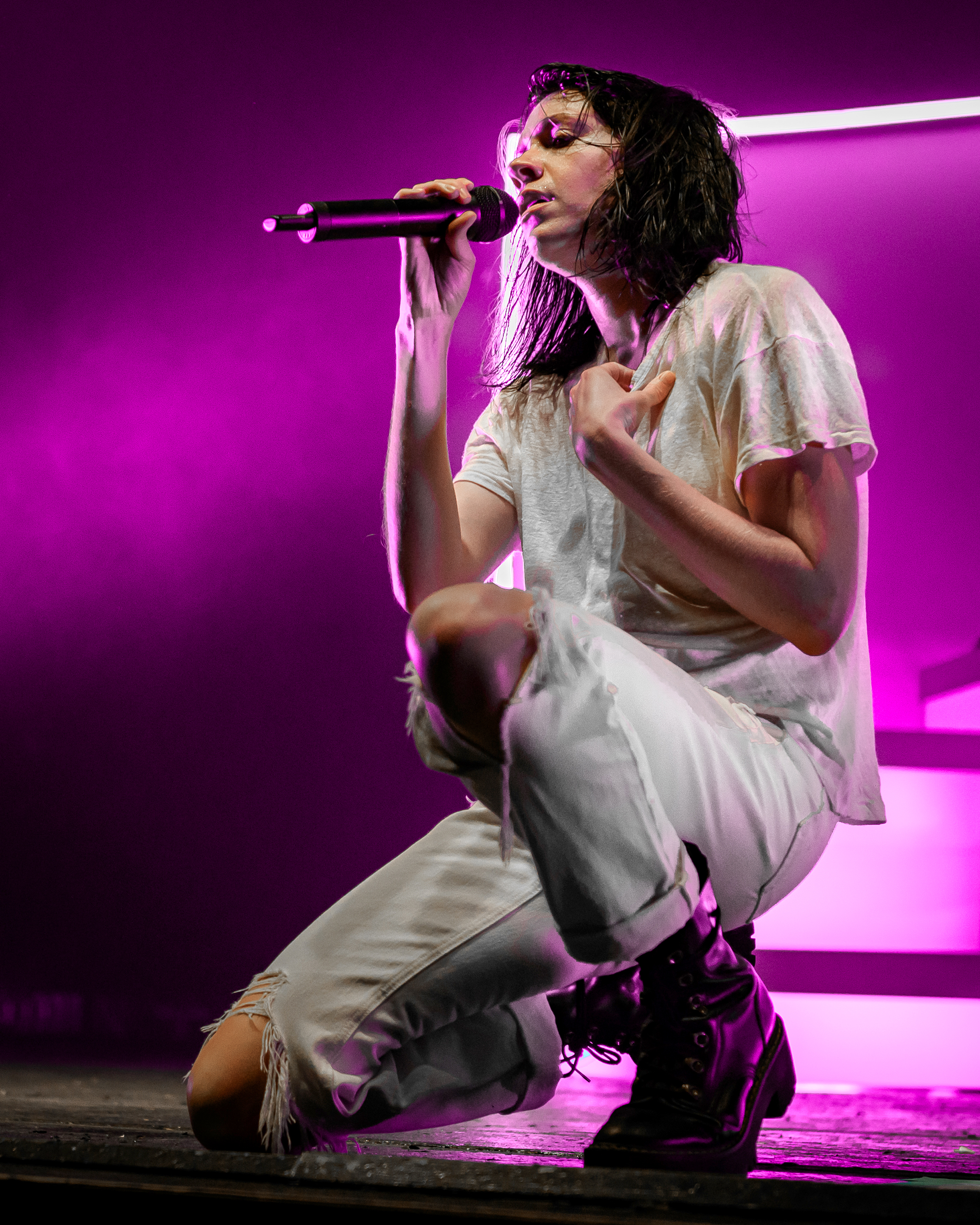
- K.Flay in 2019
- Studio albums: 5
- EPs: 9
- Singles: 42
- Music videos: 36
- Mixtapes: 5

American singer and rapper K.Flay has released five studio albums, five mixtapes, nine extended plays, 42 singles, and 28 music videos.

== Studio albums ==
Title	Details	Peak chart positions				
Title	Details	US	US Rap	US Heat.	US Indie	CAN
Life as a Dog	Released: June 24, 2014; Label: Bummer Picnic; Formats: CD, LP, digital download, streaming	133	14	2	1	—
Every Where Is Some Where	Released: April 7, 2017; Label: Interscope, Night Street; Formats: CD, LP, digital download, streaming	118	—	1	—	50
Solutions	Released: July 12, 2019; Label: Interscope, Night Street; Formats: CD, LP, digital download, streaming	—	—	—	—	—
Inside Voices / Outside Voices	Released: February 4, 2022; Label: BMG; Formats: CD, LP, digital download, streaming	—	—	—	—	—
Mono	Released: September 15, 2023; Label: Giant Music; Formats: CD, LP, digital download, streaming	—	—	8	—	—
"—" denotes a recording that did not chart or was not released in that territory.

== Mixtapes ==
Title	Details
Suburban Rap Queen	Released: November 6, 2005; Label: Self-released; Formats: CD, digital download
[appetite whetting] v2.0	Released: 2007; Label: Self-released; Formats: CD, digital download
MASHed Potatoes	Released: September 16, 2009; Label: Self-released; Formats: CD, digital download
I Stopped Caring in '96	Released: April 1, 15, and 29, 2011 (Note: I Stopped Caring in '96 was released in three volumes, each containing three tracks.); Label: Self-released; Formats: CD, digital download
West Ghost	Released: February 15, 2013; Label: Self-released; Formats: CD, digital download

== Extended plays ==
Title	Details	Peak chart positions
Title	Details	US Heat.
K.Flay	Released: October 12, 2010; Label: Self-released; Formats: CD, digital download	—
Eyes Shut	Released: January 31, 2012; Label: RCA; Formats: CD, digital download	—
What If It Is	Released: August 6, 2013; Label: RCA; Formats: CD, digital download	36
Crush Me	Released: August 19, 2016; Label: Interscope; Formats: CD, digital download	12
Seattle Sessions	Released: May 18, 2018; Label: Interscope; Formats: CD, digital download	—
Don't Judge a Song by Its Cover	Released: December 9, 2020; Label: BMG; Formats: CD, digital download	—
Inside Voices	Released: June 11, 2021; Label: BMG; Formats: CD, digital download	—
Outside Voices	Released: November 19, 2021; Label: BMG; Formats: CD, digital download	—
I'm Making Friends With The Silence	Released: November 12, 2024; Label: Giant Music; Formats: LP, digital download, streaming	—
"—" denotes a recording that did not chart or was not released in that territory.

=== Collaborative extended plays ===
Title	Details
Single and Famous (with MC Lars)	Released: August 18, 2009; Label: Horris; Formats: CD, digital download

== Singles ==
=== As lead artist ===
Title	Year	Peak chart positions		Certifications	Album
Title	Year	US Alt.	US Main.	Certifications	Album
"Crazytown"	2009	—	—		MASHed Potatoes
"Less Than Zero"	2011	—	—		I Stopped Caring in '96
"Doctor Doesn't Know"	2011	—	—		I Stopped Caring in '96
"Party"	2011	—	—		I Stopped Caring in '96
"Little Bit Crazy"	2011	—	—		Non-album single
"We Hate Everyone"	2012	—	—		Eyes Shut
"Rest Your Mind" (featuring Felix Cartal)	2012	—	—		Non-album single
"The Cops"	2013	—	—		West Ghost
"Hail Mary" (featuring Danny Brown)	2013	—	—		What If It Is
"Rawks"	2013	—	—		What If It Is
"Thicker Than Dust"	2014	—	—		Life as a Dog
"Everyone I Know"	2014	—	—		Life as a Dog
"Make Me Fade"	2014	—	—		Life as a Dog
"Can't Sleep"	2015	—	—		Life as a Dog
"FML"	2016	—	—		Non-album single
"Blood in the Cut"	2016	4	18	RIAA: Gold; MC: Gold	Every Where Is Some Where
"Black Wave"	2017	—	—		Every Where Is Some Where
"High Enough"	2017	20	—	RIAA: Platinum; BPI: Gold; PMB: Gold; SNEP: Gold	Every Where Is Some Where
"Giver"	2017	25	—		Every Where Is Some Where
"Thunder" (Remix) (with Imagine Dragons)	2017	—	—		Non-album single
"Slow March"	2018	—	—		Every Where Is Some Where
"Run For Your Life"	2018	—	—		Tomb Raider: Original Motion Picture Soundtrack
"Bad Vibes"	2019	27	—		Solutions
"This Baby Don't Cry"	2019	—	—		Solutions
"Sister"	2019	32	—		Solutions
"Not in California"	2019	—	—		Solutions
"Zen" (with X Ambassadors and Grandson)	2020	24	—		Non-album singles
"So Slow" (with Vanic)	2020	—	—		Non-album singles
"Four Letter Words"	2021	—	—		Inside Voices / Outside Voices
"TGIF" (featuring Tom Morello)	2021	—	—		Inside Voices / Outside Voices
"Nothing Can Kill Us"	2021	—	—		Inside Voices / Outside Voices
"Weirdo"	2021	—	—		Inside Voices / Outside Voices
"Superhuman" (with Party Favor)	2022	—	—		Non-album singles
"Rag Doll" (with poutyface)	2022	—	—		Non-album singles
"It's Been So Long"	2022	—	—		Non-album singles
"Raw Raw"	2023	33	—		Mono
"Shy"	2023	—	—		Mono
"T-Rex"	2023	—	—		Nimona (Soundtrack from the Netflix Film)
"Irish Goodbye" (featuring Vic Fuentes of Pierce the Veil)	2023	—	—		Mono
"Punisher"	2023	—	—		Mono
"Carsick"	2024	—	—		Mono
"Ants"	2026	—	—		TBA
"—" denotes a single that did not chart or was not released in that territory

=== As featured artist ===
Title	Year	Peak chart positions				Certifications	Album
Title	Year	US Alt.	US Main	US Rock	US Dance	Certifications	Album
"Coastin'" (Zion I featuring K.Flay)	2008	—	—	—	—		The Takeover
"We Have Arrived" (MC Lars featuring K.Flay, YTCracker, and The Former Fat Boys)	2008	—	—	—	—		The Digital Gangster LP, This Gigantic Robot Kills
"Lost in the Sun" (Grieves and Budo featuring K.Flay)	2011	—	—	—	—		Non-album singles
"It's Strange" (Louis the Child featuring K.Flay)	2015	—	—	—	38	RIAA: Gold	Non-album singles
"Back at the Start" (Viceroy featuring K.Flay)	2015	—	—	—	—		Non-album singles
"Justify You" (Kasra V featuring K.Flay)	2017	—	—	—	—		I'm with the banned
"Favorite Color Is Blue" (Robert DeLong featuring K.Flay)	2018	16	—	36	—		See You In The Future
"Lucky One" (Tom Morello featuring K.Flay)	2018	—	—	—	—		The Atlas Underground
"Make It Up as I Go" (Mike Shinoda featuring K.Flay)	2018	22	—	45	—		Post Traumatic
"Forgot How to Dream" (Ekali featuring K.Flay)	2019	—	—	—	—		Crystal Eyes
"Stupid Is as Stupid Does" (Dune Rats featuring K.Flay)	2020	—	—	—	—		Hurry Up and Wait
"Peaches (Text Voter XX to 40649)" (grandson featuring K.Flay)	2020	—	—	—	—		Non-album single
"Hurting on Purpose" (Whethan featuring K.Flay)	2020	—	—	—	—		Fantasy
"I Don't Care Anymore" (Jax Anderson featuring K.Flay)	2021	—	—	—	—		Non-album single
"You Can Get It" (Arkells featuring K.Flay)	2021	—	—	—	—		Blink Once
"Everyone Sucks But You" (Matt and Kim featuring K.Flay)	2021	—	—	—	—		Non-album single
"Off My Mind" (Joe P featuring K.Flay)	2023	—	—	—	—		Garden State Vampire
"Son of a Gun" (Judah & the Lion featuring K.Flay)	2023	—	—	—	—		The Process
"Fight Like a Girl" (Evanescence featuring K.Flay)	2025	32	13	—	—		Ballerina (Original Motion Picture Soundtrack)
"Things" (Farveblind featuring K.Flay)	2026	—	—	—	—		Micro Pleasures
"—" denotes a recording that did not chart or was not released in that territory.

== Guest appearances ==
Title	Year	Other artist(s)	Album
"Lazy Days"	2008	Mochipet	Microphonepet
"Guinevere"	2008	MC Lars, YTCracker	The Digital Gangster LP
"Other People's Property"	2008	MC Lars, YTCracker, Beefy, MC Router	The Digital Gangster LP
"It's On"	2008	AmpLive	Lift Me Up (Remixes)
"Weapons"	2009	Starting Teeth	The Way of the Intercepting Fist
"5AM"	2009	SomethingALaMode	SomethingALaMode
"About to Blow"	2010	AmpLive	Murder At the Discotech
"Shine"	2010	Eligh, The Grouch	Grey Crow
"The Giving Tree"	2011	MC Lars, Mac Lethal	Lars Attacks!
"Your Eyes"	2012	Colin Munroe	Unsung Hero
"Tiny Glowing Screens"	2013	George Watsky	Cardboard Castles
"Who What When"	2013	Lady Fingaz, G-Koop	Welcome to Lady Fingaz Lab
"Ribcage"	2013	Mary Lambert, Angel Haze	Heart on My Sleeve
"Heatwave"	2013	Wilkinson	Lazers Not Included
"How It Works"	2015	SLDGHMR, Chuck Inglish	Grid Living
"Telescope"	2015	Golden Features	XXIV
"Say It"	2015	Third Eye Blind	Dopamine
"Promise"	2015	Kaskade	Automatic
"Heartbreak Summer"	2017	RAC	Ego
"Called You Twice"	2019	Fidlar	Almost Free
"Confidence"	2019	X Ambassadors	Orion
"We All Have Dreams"	2020	Louis the Child	Here for Now

== Video game, film, and TV soundtrack appearances ==
Title	Year	Placement
"Hail Mary" (featuring Danny Brown)	2013	Need for Speed Rivals
"Easy Fix"	2013	This Is the End: Original Motion Picture Soundtrack
"It's Strange"	2015	FIFA 16
"Blood in the Cut"	2016	NBA 2K17
"Blood in the Cut"	2017	XXX: Return of Xander Cage (Music from the Motion Picture)
"Blood in the Cut"	2017	Forza Motorsport 7
"Blood in the Cut"	2017	Bojack Horseman: "Stupid Piece of Sh*t"
"Black Wave"	2017	Need for Speed Payback
"Black Wave"	2018	Asphalt 9: Legends
"Run For Your Life"	2018	Tomb Raider
"Favorite Color Is Blue" (Robert DeLong featuring K.Flay)	2018	NHL 19
"This Baby Don't Cry"	2019	13 Reasons Why, (season 3)
"Sister"	2019	The Sims 4: Realm of Magic
"Bad Vibes"	2019	NHL 20
"Bad Memory"	2020	Birds of Prey
"Can't Sleep"	2021	The Suicide Squad
"You Can Get It" (Arkells featuring K.Flay)	2021	NHL 22
"You Can Get It" (Arkells featuring K.Flay)	2021	Forza Horizon 5
"T-Rex"	2023	Nimona

== Music videos ==
Title	Year	Director(s)
"Less Than Zero"	2011	Frank Door
"Doctor Don't Know"	2011	Frank Door
"Party"	2011	Frank Door
"We Hate Everyone"	2012	Erik Beck
"Rest Your Mind"	2012	Mariana Blanco
"Sunburn"	2012	Emily Dyan Ibarra, Mark Spencer
"The Cops"	2013	Mariana Blanco
"Rawks"	2013	Ben Fee
"Thicker Than Dust"	2014	Frank Door
"Everyone I Know"	2014	OMG! Everywhere
"Make Me Fade"	2014	Ben Fee
"Can't Sleep"	2015	Emily Ibarra
"FML"	2016	Ken Edge
"Blood in the Cut"	2016	TJ Andrade
"Black Wave"	2017	Jeremy Cole
"High Enough"	2017	Lorraine Nicholson
"Slow March"	2018	Tom Cole
"Run For Your Life"	2018	Warner Bros.
"Bad Vibes"	2019	Lorraine Nicholson
"Sister"	2019	Clara Aranovich
"Not In California"	2019	Clara Aranovich
"Four Letter Words"	2021	Diego Lozano
"Nothing Can Kill Us"	2021	Christina Xing
"It's Been So Long"	2022	Eliot Lee
"Raw Raw"	2023	Griffin Olis
"Shy"	2023	Griffin Olis
"Irish Goodbye"	2023	Sonny Alvarez
"Punisher"	2023	Jennifer Pearl, Sydney Task

== With 2XT ==
=== Albums ===
Title	Details
Special Feelings	Released: May 15, 2026; Label: Self-released; Formats: LP, digital download, streaming

=== Singles ===
Title	Year	Album
"Angel"	2026	Special Feelings
"All In"	2026	Special Feelings
"Ringing In My Head"	2026	Special Feelings
