= JT Daly =

American musician, producer and visual artist (born 1981)

- Daly performing with Paper Route in 2017

Background information
- Born: Justin Thomas Daly; January 2, 1981 (age 45)
- Origin: Wellington, Ohio, U.S.
- Genres: Alternative rock; indie rock
- Occupations: Musician, producer, songwriter, visual artist, director
- Years active: 2001–present
- Formerly of: Paper Route
- Website: jtdalymusic.com

Justin Thomas "JT" Daly (born January 2, 1981) is an American musician, producer, songwriter, visual artist, and former frontman of Nashville-based rock band Paper Route. His production and songwriting work includes Benson Boone's single "Ghost Town" and contributions to Bully's album Lucky For You.

Daly's work in film and television includes composing the original score for the ESPN 30 for 30 documentary "Chuck & Tito." He also created the original score for the Amazon Prime Video series Coach Prime, and co-wrote and produced "The Big Game" musical for The Dan Le Batard Show with Stugotz.

== Career ==
=== For All the Drifters (2000–2004) ===
Justin Daly joined the indie rock band For All the Drifters in 2000 while studying music composition and art at Greenville College. The band relocated to Nashville in 2001 and released three EPs: For All the Drifters (2001), We Can Make Mistakes EP (2003), and Drifter EP (2004). Daly performed with the group until they disbanded in 2004.

=== Paper Route (2006–2018) ===
In 2006, former For All the Drifters members Chad Howat and Daly recruited Andy Smith to form Paper Route. In August 2006, the band released their self-titled EP, followed by A Thrill of Hope in December 2006.

Paper Route toured through 2007 and signed with Universal Motown in December 2008, following the release of All We Are, the band's third EP. Paper Route's full-length debut, Absence, was released in April 2009 and reached No. 13 on the Billboard Heatseekers chart. The band independently released their second full-length record, The Peace of Wild Things, on September 11, 2012 after Universal Motown ceased operations. The album reached No. 8 on the Billboard Heatseekers chart. Paper Route released their third full-length album, Real Emotion, on September 23, 2016, which charted on the Billboard Heatseekers chart, reaching No. 12.

=== Mad Wave (2018–present) ===
The indie psych-rock group Mad Wave (initially named The Voodoo Children) was established in 2018 by Daly and Nikki Barber with their first single, "Tangerines & Daffodils".

=== Solo work (2010-present) ===
In 2012, Daly released his debut solo album, Memory. The same year, he released a cover of the Christmas song "Silver Bells", in collaboration with Brandi Cyrus.

In February 2014, Daly released The Blackest Bird under JT Daly & The Blood Orchestra.

In 2019, Daly was featured on the song “Tangled Up” by Chanele McGuinness. He is also credited as a co-writer, alongside McGuinness and Josh Lippi.

=== Visual art ===
Daly began working as a visual artist in 2004 at Teleprompt Records, where he remained until 2006. At Teleprompt, he designed artwork for the company's roster, including Mutemath. He has also created visual art for musicians including Wilco, Paramore, Sufjan Stevens, and Black Rebel Motorcycle Club.

In 2006, Daly began work on SS Mechanics (Sight and Sound), a multimedia project with Daniel James of the folktronica band Canon Blue. SS Mechanics created a multimedia installation with poet Bradley Hathaway. They also released a print-only version of the SS Handbook, a book containing paintings and poetry by Daly and James. Later that year, Daly was the creator, director, and producer of the music video for Edison Glass's "This House". The clip was screened at film festivals including The Chicago International Film Festival, The Nashville Film Festival, and The Imagination Film Festival. He was nominated for a Dove Award (Short Form Music Video of the Year) in 2007.

Other visual works include Bed Time Stories (2013), MonstersINairports (2012), KIDZ (2010), The Body Is a Kingdom, The Kingdom Is Beautiful, and Architechnopoly. He also designed for Griffin Technology and the band Paramore.

=== Songwriting and Production credits (2009-present) ===
Daly and Chad Howat contributed an instrumental track, "The Music," to the 2009 film 500 Days of Summer.

Daly co-wrote and produced several tracks on Sarah Macintosh's 2011 album, Current.

Daly was featured on the Camp America track, "Leader of the Pack."

Daly produced and co-wrote tracks on K.Flay's Crush Me EP, including the alt rock track "Blood in the Cut". Daly co-wrote and produced the tracks "Blood in the Cut," "Champagne", "Hollywood Forever", "You Felt Right", and "Slow March" from K.Flay's 2017 album, Every Where Is Some Where. His contributions to Every Where Is Some Where earned him two Grammy nominations for Best Rock Song ("Blood in the Cut") and Best Engineered Album. Daly continued to write and produce tracks with K.Flay for her Solutions (2019), Inside Voices / Outside Voices (2022), and Mono (2023) albums.

Daly co-wrote and produced tracks on Pvris's album, "Evergreen" and single, "Hallucinations," which Billboard ranked as the No. 1 alternative and rock song of 2019. He also co-wrote and produced tracks on K.Flay's album Every Where Is Some Where with the single "Blood in the Cut", receiving Grammy nominations for Best Rock Song and Best Engineered Album for his work. He has also worked on singles for Demi Lovato, Isaac Dunbar, and Quinn XCII.

In 2019, Daly produced Hallucinations, the third EP from American alternative rock band Pvris.

== Awards ==
Grammy Awards

Year	Artist	Nominee/work	Award	Result
2018	K.Flay	"Blood in the Cut"	Best Rock Song	Nominated
2018	K.Flay	Every Where Is Some Where	Best Engineered Album, Non-Classical	Nominated
