= Paper Route (band) =

Indie band from Nashville, Tennessee

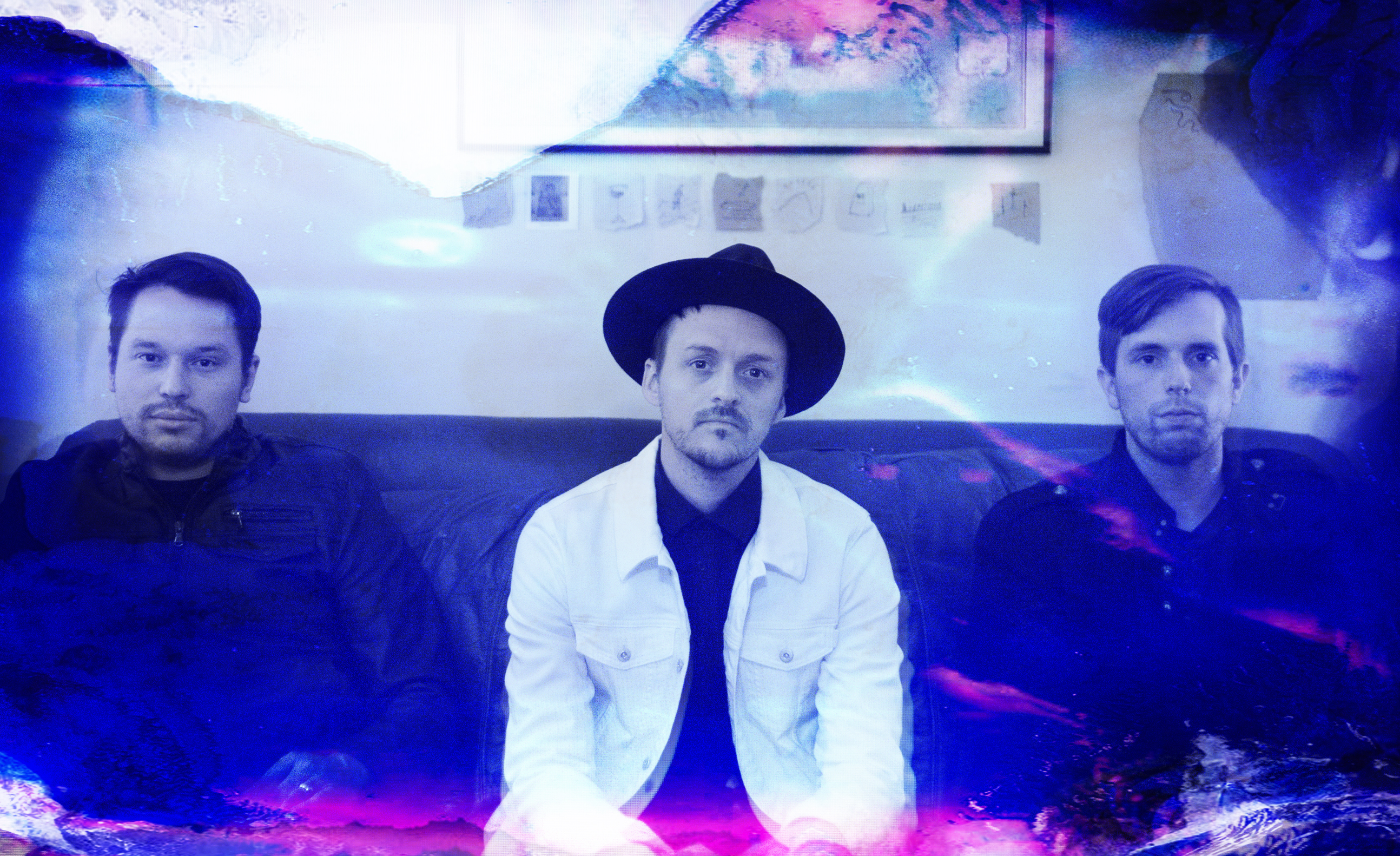
- Nick Aranda, JT Daly and Chad Howat in 2015

Background information
- Origin: Nashville, Tennessee, U.S.
- Genres: Indie rock; synthpop; indie pop; post-punk revival; shoegaze
- Years active: 2004–2019 (on indefinite hiatus)
- Labels: Universal Motown; Universal Republic; Tree of Hearts; Kemosabe
- Members: JT Daly; Chad Howat; Nick Aranda
- Past members: Andy Smith; Gavin McDonald
- Website: www.paperrouteonline.com

Paper Route is an American experimental indie rock and indie pop band from Nashville, Tennessee formed in 2004. It consists of JT Daly (vocals, keyboards, percussion, samplers), Chad Howat (bass, piano, programming), and Nick Aranda (guitars). The band has released three full-length albums and several EPs.

== History ==
=== Formation and early years ===
Chad Howat, JT Daly and co-founding member Andy Smith met while attending Greenville College in Greenville, Illinois. Paper Route was founded shortly after the disbanding of the trios' previous band, For All The Drifters.

The band's self-titled debut EP was released on August 29, 2006. In December 2006, the band released a Christmas EP titled A Thrill of Hope through Universal Music. A song from the EP, "The Music", was later featured in the 2009 film (500) Days of Summer.

In 2007, Paper Route were featured on Paste magazine's website as artists to watch: "The group produces a refreshing mix of the organic and the electronic, with quality songwriting to match."

In early 2008, their music was featured in the television show One Tree Hill in episodes "Life Is Short" and "Cryin' Won't Help You Now". The band's song "Last Time" was chosen to be the theme song for the 2008 Nike+ Human Race.

=== Absence (2009–10) ===
The band's major label debut, Absence, was released on Universal Records on April 28, 2009. The album reached number 13 on the Billboard Heatseekers chart.

In March 2010, Paper Route were named one of '10 Artists to Watch in 2010' by American music website Shred News. In November 2010, the song "Gutter" was featured on TV series CSI: NY in the episode "Hide Sight".

In November 2010, Paper Route announced that Andy Smith left the band.

=== The Peace of Wild Things (2010–13) ===
In September 2010, two songs by Paper Route – including "Calm My Soul" – were featured on MTV's show World of Jenks. In June 2011, the song "You Kill Me" from the band's 2008 EP Are We All Forgotten was featured in an episode of MTV's Teen Wolf.

The first single off the band's second studio album was titled "Better Life" and released to iTunes and Amazon on November 1, 2011. A song titled "Sugar" was released as a part of a free compilation album on NoiseTrade on Valentine's Day 2012. JT Daly also created remixes of Switchfoot's songs "The Original" and "Dark Horses" from Switchfoot's critically acclaimed record Vice Verses. The remixes were featured on Switchfoot's EP Vice Re-Verses, which was released in April 2012.

In May 2012, Paper Route were featured in the third episode of BYUtv's Audio-Files. On June 18, 2012, Paper Route announced that their second album, titled The Peace of Wild Things, would be released on September 11, 2012, and that the second single from the album would be "You and I". A music video for the single was released onto YouTube on August 31, 2012. Upon release, The Peace of Wild Things reached number eight on the Billboard Heatseekers chart, and number 164 on the Billboard 200.

In 2013, Paper Route's song "Better Life" was featured in The Vampire Diaries episode, titled "True Lies". On October 6, 2013, the band released a cover of "Royals" by Lorde, followed by a cover of Destiny's Child's "Say My Name" on November 26, 2013.

=== Real Emotion (2014–present) ===
On September 24, 2014, Paper Route announced that drummer Gavin McDonald would be leaving the band, pushing back planned October tour dates to December. The band performed two new songs on a four-city East Coast tour in February 2015, including their new single "Zhivago". The track was released as part of the Ten Out of Tenn compilation album on March 17, 2015.

In July 2015, JT Daly and Chad Howat announced that Nick Aranda was made an official member of the band. The same month, Paper Route announced that they had signed to Kemosabe Records, an offshoot of Sony Music Entertainment. On February 26, 2016, the band released a new single "Laugh About It". Howat's website confirmed that the album would be titled "Real Emotion". The second single off the album, "Chariots", was released on June 12, 2016. The song premiered at E3 as the exclusive gameplay trailer track for FIFA 17, the video game by EA Sports, and later was featured in the game's soundtrack. On September 23, 2016, the album Real Emotion was released. The band made their late night television debut on NBC's Late Night with Seth Meyers on February 1, 2017, where they performed "Balconies."

They announced an indefinite hiatus in early 2019.

== Touring ==
From late July through August 2008, Paper Route was part of the Final Riot! Tour, with Paramore, Phantom Planet, and Jack's Mannequin. They toured with Paramore again in 2009 on the band's third album. In 2008 they also toured with Passion Pit. In 2009 they also toured with Copeland and She Wants Revenge. In 2010 they toured with Owl City and Lights. In 2012 they toured with Half Noise, Switchfoot, and Mutemath. In 2013 they toured with Anberlin and also Imagine Dragons. In early 2016, Paper Route toured again with Mutemath. In October 2016, following the release of Real Emotion, they embarked on a 20-date east coast/midwest headlining tour (The Really Emotional Tour) with Half Noise as the support act. They followed this up supporting K. Flay on the second part of her Crush Me Tour in February 2017.

== Discography ==
=== Albums ===
Title	Album details	Peak chart positions			
Title	Album details	US	US Heat.	US Ind.	NZL
Absence	Released: April 28, 2009; Label: Universal Motown; Formats: LP CD, digital download	—	13	—	—
The Peace of Wild Things	Released: September 11, 2012; Label: Tree of Hearts; Formats: LP, CD, digital download	164	8	40	34
Real Emotion	Released: September 23, 2016; Label: Kemosabe Records; Formats: LP, CD, digital download	—	12	—	—

=== Extended plays ===
Title	Album details
Paper Route	Released: August 29, 2006; Label: Drama Club Records; Formats: CD
A Thrill of Hope (Christmas EP)	Released: December 2006; Label: Universal; Formats: Digital download
Are We All Forgotten	Released: July 8, 2008; Label: Low Altitude Records; Formats: CD, digital download
Thank God the Year Is Finally Over (Christmas EP)	Released: 2009; Formats: Digital download
Additions (Remixes)	Released: March 30, 2010; Label: Universal Motown; Formats: CD, digital download

=== Singles ===
Title	Year	Album
"Carousel"	2009	Absence
"Gutter"	2010	Absence
"Better Life"	2011	The Peace of Wild Things
"You and I"	2012	The Peace of Wild Things
"Royals" (Lorde cover)	2013	Non-album singles
"Say My Name" (Destiny's Child cover)	2013	Non-album singles
"Zhivago"	2015	Non-album singles
"Laugh About It"	2016	Real Emotion
"Chariots"	2016	Real Emotion
"Balconies"	2016	Real Emotion

== Band members ==
Current

- JT Daly – vocals, keyboards, percussion, samplers (2004–2019). Daly has been involved in other projects including music production (most recently produced and co-wrote songs with alt-rock artist K. Flay, including hit single "Blood in the Cut"), soundtrack composition (short film for Smarkmark), visual art exhibitions ("rest easy", "architechnopoly", "love fever sunburn", and "the body is a kingdom and the kingdom is beautiful") and film direction and production (including "This House" for Edison Glass).
- Chad Howat – bass, piano, programming (2004–2019). Outside of his work with Paper Route, Howat has produced, mixed, and engineered for several artists including Paramore, K. Flay, Brooke Waggoner, Hillsong United, and Kye Kye ).
- Nick Aranda - guitar, bass (2015–2019). Aranda toured with Paper Route on their tour promoting The Peace of Wild Things and became an official band member in July 2015. He has toured with bands including The Rocket Summer and was a founding member of Dizmas.

Former

- Andy Smith – vocals, guitars, harmonica, theremin (2004–2010). After parting ways with Paper Route, Andy formed the band Brother Leather, independently releasing the album Meat Mural in 2013. He is currently recording an untitled follow up with Stephen P Bohn (ex-Death Comesto Matteson).
- Gavin McDonald – drums (2004–2014). Gavin has performed with several bands including Canon Blue, Macrosick and New World. He also is featured as a drummer on several albums.
