= Ant-Man and the Wasp: Quantumania (soundtrack) =

2023 film soundtrack album

Ant-Man and the Wasp: Quantumania (Original Motion Picture Soundtrack)

Film score by Christophe Beck
- Released: February 15, 2023 (digital)
- Genre: Film score
- Length: 60:14
- Labels: Hollywood; Marvel Music

Christophe Beck chronology
Free Guy (2021)	Ant-Man and the Wasp: Quantumania (Original Motion Picture Soundtrack) (2023)	Shazam! Fury of the Gods (2023)

Ant-Man and the Wasp: Quantumania (Original Motion Picture Soundtrack) is the film score for the Marvel Studios film Ant-Man and the Wasp: Quantumania. The score was composed by Christophe Beck. Hollywood Records released the album digitally on February 15, 2023.

== Background ==
Christophe Beck was revealed to be composing the score by July 2022, after previously working on the previous two Ant-Man films, as well as the MCU Disney+ series WandaVision and Hawkeye (both in 2021). The soundtrack album was released digitally by Hollywood Records and Marvel Music on February 15, 2023, with its first track, "Theme from Quantumania", released as a digital single on February 12.

== Track listing ==
All music composed by Christophe Beck.

Ant-Man and the Wasp: Quantumania (Original Motion Picture Soundtrack)
No.	Title	Length
1.	"Theme from Quantumania"	2:33
2.	"We Should Be Dead"	2:21
3.	"What Is This Place?"	1:48
4.	"Skies of Axia"	2:44
5.	"The Hunter"	4:24
6.	"Fifty Shades of Kang"	3:23
7.	"Quantum Nexus"	3:16
8.	"The Conqueror"	6:17
9.	"Through the Storm"	3:14
10.	"Sting Operation"	2:17
11.	"Honey, I Shrunk the Energy Core"	3:02
12.	"Look Out for the Little Guy"	2:11
13.	"He's Kang, He Saw, He Conquered"	1:23
14.	"Sting Low, Sweet Variant"	3:41
15.	"Like Father Like Daughter"	1:09
16.	"Kang Bang"	3:19
17.	"Alien Ant Harm"	2:29
18.	"Threnody for a Reformed Dick"	2:21
19.	"Lang vs. Kang"	2:49
20.	"Don't Let Go"	2:17
21.	"Hymenoptera"	2:32
22.	"Holes (featuring David Dastmalchian)"	0:44
Total length:		60:14

== Additional music ==
Two additional songs were found in the film, "Welcome Back" by John Sebastian and "Il Capo" by Austin Filingo & John W Padgett
