= Sugaregg =

Studio album by Bully
- Released: August 21, 2020
- Recorded: 2019
- Studio: Pachyderm (Cannon Falls, Minnesota); Palace Sound (Toronto)
- Genre: Indie rock; alternative rock; grunge
- Length: 38:06
- Label: Sub Pop
- Producer: Alicia Bognanno; John Congleton; Graham Walsh

Bully chronology
Losing (2017)	Sugaregg (2020)	Lucky for You (2023)

Singles from Sugaregg
- 1. "Where to Start" Released: June 11, 2020; 2. "Every Tradition" Released: July 8, 2020; 3. "Hours and Hours" Released: August 5, 2020; 4. "Prism" Released: August 12, 2020

Sugaregg is the third studio album by American rock act Bully. It was released on August 21, 2020, by Sub Pop. Following two albums that were recorded by Bully as a band, Sugaregg is the first Bully album to be recorded as a solo project of frontwoman Alicia Bognanno. She co-produced Sugaregg with John Congleton and Graham Walsh, making it the first Bully album not to be solely produced by Bognanno.

== Background and recording ==
Following the release of Bully's second album Losing (2017), bassist Reece Lazarus and guitarist Clayton Parker departed the band, leaving lead vocalist and guitarist Alicia Bognanno as its sole remaining member. Bognanno opted to continue recording solo material under the Bully name. After having self-produced Bully's first two albums Feels Like (2015) and Losing, Bognanno decided to seek outside assistance in producing Sugaregg, as she felt that the quality of the music would be compromised if she continued to handle both songwriting and engineering duties by herself. She enlisted John Congleton to co-produce the album with her, while Graham Walsh of the band Holy Fuck provided additional production.

Bognanno said in June 2019 that Sugaregg would be produced "in a completely different way, on completely different terms... a lot has changed and I feel a lot better in every aspect of my life than I have in a long time." That summer, she recorded the bulk of the album in two weeks at Pachyderm Studios in Cannon Falls, Minnesota, accompanied by Congleton and backing musicians Zachary Dawes and Wesley Mitchell. Bognanno then worked on additional material for the record over the next five months, which she recorded at Palace Sound in Toronto, assisted by Walsh.

The songs on Sugaregg were written by Bognanno "on and off" over a period of around three years. She derived the album's title from an episode of the WNYC radio program Radiolab that profiled a man who preserved an egg-shaped mold of sugar, a keepsake from his childhood, for several decades.

== Critical reception ==
Professional ratings
Aggregate scores
Source	Rating
AnyDecentMusic?	7.3/10
Metacritic	77/100
Review scores
Source	Rating
AllMusic	3.5/5 stars
Clash	8/10
DIY	4/5 stars
Exclaim!	7/10
The Guardian	4/5 stars
NME	4/5 stars
Pitchfork	7.7/10
PopMatters	7/10
Rolling Stone	3.5/5 stars
Under the Radar	6.5/10

Upon its release, Sugaregg was generally well received by music critics. At Metacritic, which assigns a normalized rating out of 100 to reviews from professional publications, the album received an average score of 77, based on 13 reviews.

== Track listing ==
All tracks are written by Alicia Bognanno

Sugaregg track listing
No.	Title	Length
1.	"Add It On"	3:20
2.	"Every Tradition"	3:25
3.	"Where to Start"	3:00
4.	"Prism"	5:02
5.	"You"	2:24
6.	"Let You"	2:54
7.	"Like Fire"	3:04
8.	"Stuck in Your Head"	2:08
9.	"Come Down"	4:12
10.	"Not Ashamed"	2:22
11.	"Hours and Hours"	3:30
12.	"What I Wanted"	2:45
Total length:		38:06

== Personnel ==
Credits are adapted from the album's liner notes.

- Alicia Bognanno – vocals, guitar, bass, engineering, cover photography
- Angelina Castillo – photography
- John Congleton – engineering, mixing
- Zachary Dawes – bass
- Heba Kadry – mastering
- Wesley Mitchell – drums
- Graham Walsh – engineering, mixing

== Charts ==
Chart performance for Sugaregg
Chart (2020)	Peak position
UK Independent Album Breakers (OCC)	14
US Heatseekers Albums (Billboard)	11
US Top Album Sales (Billboard)	29
