= Real Emotion =

Real Emotion may refer to:

- "Real Emotion", a 1993 song by Celine Dion from The Colour of My Love
- "Real Emotion", a 2003 song by Koda Kumi from Grow into One
- Real Emotion (album) by Paper Route
