= Car sick (disambiguation) =

Motion sickness (or car sickness) is a condition in which a disagreement exists between visually perceived movement and the vestibular system's sense of movement.

Car Sick may also refer to:

- "Car Sick", song by Gunna from Drip Season 3
- "Carsick", a song by K.Flay from Mono
- "Car Sick", song by Rustic Overtones
