= Lose You =

Lose You may refer to:

- Lose You (Bully song), 2023
- Lose You (Peaches song), 2009
- Lose You (Tiësto song), 2020
- Lose You, a song by Drake, from the album More Life
- Lose You, a song by Sam Smith, from the album Gloria
