= Nimona (soundtrack) =

Nimona (Soundtrack from the Netflix Film)

Film score by Christophe Beck
- Released: June 30, 2023
- Recorded: 2023
- Studios: AIR Studios, London
- Genre: Film score
- Length: 46:58
- Label: Netflix Music
- Producer: Fernand Bos

Christophe Beck chronology
Shazam! Fury of the Gods (2023)	Nimona (2023)	Agatha All Along (2024)

Singles from Nimona (Soundtrack from the Netflix Film)
- 1. "T-Rex" Released: June 23, 2023

Nimona (Soundtrack from the Netflix Film) is the score album to the 2023 film of the same name directed by Nick Bruno and Troy Quane. The score composed by Christophe Beck consisted of a "classical and traditional music representing the fairytale past" and infused with punk rock and metal genres, to accompany the story and its characters. It also accompanies a soundtrack that consisted of contemporary hits from popular artists handpicked by the music supervisor Kier Lehman.

Besides the existing music, an original song "T-Rex" performed by K.Flay released as a single on June 23, 2023. Beck's score was released into a separate album by Netflix Music, the following week, which also included the song "T-Rex".

== Development ==
Beck was initially part of scoring Nimona in late-2017, when the film was under development at Blue Sky Studios and 20th Century Animation, with Patrick Osborne directing, having previously worked on Blue Sky's The Peanuts Movie (2015). He was continued to be under consideration during the production schedule—Osborne's exit and Bruno and Quane taking over the directorial duties, and the film's cancellation and subsequent revival (Note: Following The Walt Disney Company's acquisition of Fox in March 2019, the film was subjected to numerous delays at one point of time its production cancelled as Disney announced the closure of Blue Sky Studios in April 2021. The film was revived by Annapurna Pictures in April 2022 and sold to Netflix (see production).)—which he called it "the longest time he was ever been on a project" and was the challenging aspect. He was officially confirmed as the film's composer in May 2021, while Kier Lehman was the music supervisor, noteworthy for the music of Spider-Verse film series.

Beck called the setting and combination as "never seen before" where the "medieval environment would have knights with swords and cell phones". To capture the medieval setting, he wrote a traditional orchestral music using a certain type and infused it with contemporary elements using electronics and synthesizers forming the backbone of the story. He further wrote two emotional themes for Nimona and Ballister, which were "strong and heartfelt" and simultaneously interplayed with one another to serve the emotional content. The former, was much softer and "speaks to the way every human being on this planet has a mask that they show the rest of the world and, in Nimona's case, the mask she's choosing to show Ballister is 'I'm having fun. I like chaos. I like mayhem. I like to beat people up, and I like to be the villain.'" He also had written an heroic theme that consisted of brass music that deviates into the low register of trombones and French horns, to give a "snarly kind of effect". To give the punk rock feel, he mocked up guitar riffs and heavy drum moments and took classical pieces that were rearranged in a way to sound "fun and contemporary". Although he avoided serious and goofy music, he wanted to drive it with the characters seriously and still feel permission to laugh.

Most of the musical selections consisted of female vocals, including the original song "T-Rex" written for the film and performed by K.Flay. Beck wanted to "go underneath and bring forth the pain and loneliness that Nimona is facing", hence a lot of her songs have female vocals and wanted to include female vocalists in the background score. Lehman felt the voices were important to represent the character and the kind of community being drawn and speaking in this film. This included artists who have a broad appeal and speaking to the community, and they need to be strong to match the attitude and energy that Nimona brings. The selections consisted of artists such as Karen O, Santigold, the Dolly Rockers, the Dickies, Metric and Dope Saint Jude. Bruno and Quane admitted that they did not choreograph straight to the music, instead acting as the catalyst "to drive the action, as if these characters were listening to the soundtrack along the way. Whether sword fighting or riding a rhino, the action lands on a beat, and that brings out the musicality in such a fun way."

== Track listing ==
No.	Title	Length
1.	"T-Rex" (K. Flay)	2:29
2.	"Nimona's Theme"	3:00
3.	"The Legend of Gloreth"	1:13
4.	"The Night to Knight"	1:44
5.	"Regicide"	3:50
6.	"Everybody Hates You Too"	2:47
7.	"Born to Protect"	1:36
8.	"Caught"	0:57
9.	"Last Stop"	1:44
10.	"Healed"	1:32
11.	"Together"	2:02
12.	"The Search"	0:42
13.	"Zombies"	1:18
14.	"Say It"	1:38
15.	"Back to the Shadows"	1:59
16.	"Sacrifice"	5:32
17.	"Let's Go"	3:12
18.	"Please Come Back"	4:11
19.	"Gloreth's Theme"	2:58
20.	"Ballister's Theme"	2:34
Total length:		46:58

== Release and reception ==
Besides the existing music, an original song "T-Rex" performed by K.Flay released as a single on June 23, 2023. Beck's score was released into a separate album by Netflix Music, the following week, which also included the song "T-Rex". The album will be released on vinyl in the third quarter of 2024.

Ferdosa of Screen Rant wrote "Christophe Beck perfectly supports the animation style with a boisterous score that compliments the exciting set pieces and the emotional sequences, constantly adapting to the ebbs and flow of the story while carrying the audience through stimulating action sequences and the more in-depth moving moments." Frank Scheck of The Hollywood Reporter complimented the score and the musical selections, saying "Christophe Beck's orchestral score, enlivened by various other musical styles — including some character-befitting punk rock interludes for Nimona — is another strong contribution." Steve Seigh of JoBlo.com wrote Beck's score "gives the adventure an overwhelming sense of grandiosity". Pramit Chatterjee of DMT categorised the score as well as the needle drops as "incredibly fun". Variety's complimented that Beck's "thrash-metal score" yields the "distinctly teen-friendly toon".

== Additional music ==
Songs that are featured in the film, but not in the soundtrack album, includes: "Grrrl Like" by Dope Saint Jude, "Go!" by Santigold feat. Karen O, "Careless Whisper" by the film's cast, "The Tra La La Song (One Banana, Two Banana)" by the Banana Splits, "Breaking the Law" by Judas Priest, "Because I'm Awesome" by the Dollyrots, "Banana Splits" by the Dickies, "Alright Alright (Here's My Fist Where's the Fight)" by Sahara Hotnights, "Gold Guns Girls" by Metric and "One Two Punch" by Jessica Boudreaux. A playlist containing the songs and the score would be released in digital platforms.
