= Lucky for You =

Studio album by Bully
- Released: June 2, 2023
- Length: 31:33
- Label: Sub Pop
- Producer: JT Daly

Bully chronology
Sugaregg (2020)	Lucky for You (2023)

Lucky for You is the fourth studio album by American alternative rock band Bully released in 2023 by Sub Pop. The album was preceded by the single "Days Move Slow" and has received positive reviews from critics.

== Reception ==
Lucky for You received positive reviews from critics noted at review aggregator Metacritic. It has a weighted average score of 81 out of 100, based on nine reviews. Emma Swann of DIY Magazine gave this release 5 out of 5 stars, calling it "a near-perfect album if there ever was one". In Exclaim!, Kate Shepherd gave Lucky for You an 8 out of 10, calling it lyrically "a study in contrasts" and "a confident, compelling record that reveals—and revels in—the softness behind the feedback and fuzz that continue to make Bully a force to be reckoned with". The Line of Best Fit's Steven Loftin rated this release a 9 out of 10, calling it "undoubtedly Bully's best album yet". Both Paste and Stereogum named this album of the week: the former had a review from Eric Bennett scored 8.6, calling it "an open-hearted, anthemic career best" and in the latter, James Rettig calls this release "the kind of flex that's hard to pull off for a project a decade into its existence". In a June round-up of the best albums of 2023, the publication placed this at sixth, with Rachel Brodsky writing that it "takes new strides—the tone is darker, muddier, and raspier—but it's still 100 percent Bully, which means distortion-heavy hooks and total candor". On June 19, Paste reviewed the best albums of the year so far, ranking this at thirteenth for being "another strong collection of anthemic post-grunge that doubles as Bully's poppiest record so far". Peyton Thomas of Pitchfork gave a more mixed review, scoring the album a 6.6 out of 10, critiquing JT Daly's production and writing that "it's heart-wrenching to imagine how much better these songs would be, how much more worthy of showcasing [frontwoman Alicia] Bognanno's maturation as an artist, had she presided solely over production", but still praising the "lyrical introspection and emotional complexity" in the music.

In June 2023, Alternative Press published an unranked list of the top 25 albums of the year to date and included this release, calling it "diaristic and open without being depressing or falling into any indie tropes". Editors of Vogue included this in an unranked list of the 22 best albums of the year, published on October 23, 2023, with critic Corey Seymour calling this album "great fun" that compares to riot grrrl albums from the 1990s and Olivia Rodrigo.

Lucky for You in best-of lists
Outlet	Listing	Rank
Bandcamp	The Best Albums of 2023	—N/a
Paste	The 50 Best Albums of 2023	11
Paste	The 30 Best Rock Albums of 2023	—N/a
PopMatters	The 30 Best Rock Albums of 2023	17
Rolling Stone	The 100 Best Albums of 2023	89
Rolling Stone	The 40 Best Indie-Rock Albums of 2023	—N/a
Stereogum	The 50 Best Albums of 2023	13
The Ringer	The 27 Best Albums of 2023	1
Under the Radar	Under the Radar's Top 100 Albums of 2023	17
World Cafe	The John Morrison's Favorite Albums of 2023	—N/a

== Track listing ==
1. "All I Do" – 3:41
2. "Days Move Slow" – 2:40
3. "A Wonderful Life" – 3:03
4. "Hard to Love" – 2:33
5. "Change Your Mind" – 3:58
6. "How Will I Know" – 3:11
7. "A Love Profound" – 4:05
8. "Lose You" – 2:55
9. "Ms. America" – 3:35
10. "All This Noise" – 1:50

== Personnel ==
Bully

- Alicia Bognanno – vocals, instrumentation, art direction, design

Additional personnel

- Sasha Barr – art direction, design
- JT Daly – instrumentation, mixing, production
- Alysse Gafkjen – cover photography
- Joe LaPorta – mastering
- Josh Lovell – mixing
- Emily Nelson Rodgers – cello
- Soccer Mommy – vocals on "Lose You"

== See also ==
- List of 2023 albums
