= Losing (album) =

Studio album by Bully
- Released: October 20, 2017
- Recorded: 2016
- Studios: Electrical Audio (Chicago, Illinois)
- Genres: Indie rock; alternative rock; grunge
- Length: 37:47
- Label: Sub Pop
- Producer: Alicia Bognanno

Bully chronology
| Feels Like (2015) | Losing (2017) | Sugaregg (2020) |

Singles from Losing
- 1. "Feel the Same" Released: August 1, 2017; 2. "Running" Released: August 30, 2017; 3. "Kills to Be Resistant" Released: September 27, 2017

Professional ratings
Aggregate scores
| Source | Rating |
|---|---|
| AnyDecentMusic? | 6.8/10 |
| Metacritic | 74/100 |
Review scores
| Source | Rating |
| AllMusic | 3/5 stars |
| The A.V. Club | B |
| Consequence | B− |
| DIY | 4/5 stars |
| NME | 4/5 stars |
| Pitchfork | 7.2/10 |
| PopMatters | 7/10 |
| Q | 4/5 stars |
| Rolling Stone | 3.5/5 stars |
| Uncut | 7/10 |

Losing is the second studio album by American rock band Bully. It was released on October 20, 2017 by Sub Pop. The album was produced by Bully frontwoman Alicia Bognanno and recorded in 2016 at Electrical Audio in Chicago.

== Track listing ==
All tracks are written by Alicia Bognanno.

| No. | Title | Length |
|---|---|---|
| 1. | "Feel the Same" | 1:59 |
| 2. | "Kills to Be Resistant" | 3:25 |
| 3. | "Running" | 3:41 |
| 4. | "Seeing It" | 3:31 |
| 5. | "Guess There" | 3:00 |
| 6. | "Blame" | 3:23 |
| 7. | "Focused" | 4:30 |
| 8. | "Not the Way" | 2:35 |
| 9. | "Spiral" | 2:31 |
| 10. | "Either Way" | 2:17 |
| 11. | "You Could Be Wrong" | 2:42 |
| 12. | "Hate and Control" | 4:13 |
| Total length: | | 37:47 |

== Personnel ==
Credits are adapted from the album's liner notes.

Bully

- Alicia Bognanno – vocals, guitar
- Reece Lazarus – bass
- Clayton Parker – guitar

Additional musicians

- Casey Weissbuch – drums

Production

- Chris Allgood – mastering (assistant)
- Alicia Bognanno – engineering, mixing
- Emily Lazar – mastering
- Jon San Paolo – engineering (assistant)

Design

- Stewart Copeland – artwork
- Alysse Gafkjen – photography

== Charts ==
| Chart (2017) | Peak position |
|---|---|
| UK Independent Album Breakers (OCC) | 16 |
| US Heatseekers Albums (Billboard) | 6 |
| US Independent Albums (Billboard) | 19 |
| US Top Album Sales (Billboard) | 87 |
