= Lose You (Bully song) =

Single by Bully

from the album Lucky for You
- Released: February 15, 2023
- Genre: Rock

"Lose You" is a 2023 song by American rock band Bully. It features guest vocal harmonies by Sophie Allison, known professionally as Soccer Mommy. It appears on the album Lucky for You.

== Background and recording ==
The song was recorded at MMK Studios and at Alicia Bognanno’s Nashville residence. She said it was the first time it had ever occurred to her to have another vocalist contribute to a Bully recording. She said: "I love Sophie’s voice and have always admired everything she does so to me it was a no brainer. Watching her soar out of the Nashville scene and dominate indie music world wide has been a joy." Despite this, Rolling Stone said that the band's 2014 debut EP featured guest vocal performances.

== Lyrics ==
The song's lyrics explore the philosophical concept of impermanence. Bully frontperson Alicia Bognanno said that "reflection is often followed by growth and to me that's what life is all about."

== Music video ==
A video was made for the track. According to Rolling Stone, the video features a "woman being chased by a dog underwater".
