= High Enough (K.Flay song) =

2017 song by K.Flay

Single by K.Flay

from the album Every Where Is Some Where
- Released: March 10, 2017
- Length: 3:51
- Label: Interscope; Night Street
- Songwriters: Kristine Flaherty; Mike Elizondo
- Producer: Elizondo

K.Flay singles chronology
"Black Wave" (2017)	"High Enough" (2017)	"Giver" (2017)

Music video
- "High Enough" on YouTube

"High Enough" is a song by American musician K.Flay as the third single from her second studio album Every Where Is Some Where following "Blood in the Cut" and "Black Wave". It was released through Interscope and Night Street Records on March 10, 2017.

== Background and composition ==
"High Enough" was written by K.Flay and Mike Elizondo who also produced the track. The lyrics of the song compare K.Flay's love for her lover to a drug with lines like "Don't try to give me cold water / I don't want to sober up". In a statement, K.Flay further described the background of the song:

There are so many songs out there about getting fucked up. I think a part of me was asking the question: "What if I’m already high enough? What if I don’t need anything but what I’ve got?" There are many moments in my life—whether it’s because of a person or a place—that I don’t want to feel altered or high or buzzed. I just want to feel exactly what I’m feeling.

— K.Flay

== Music video ==
The music video for "High Enough" premiered on May 10, 2017, and was directed by Lorraine Nicolson. The video features an abusive marriage, played by Savannah Harrison and Scott Hislop, in a rundown trailer park. K.Flay, in the adjacent trailer, plays music through a cassette deck to stop their fighting. This causes both of them to start dancing. When she stops the music, they both go back to fighting as if they hadn't just danced. At the end of the video, K.Flay, visits their trailer and is shouted to leave.

== Track listing ==
- Digital download
1. "High Enough" – 3:51
- Digital download – (Remix)
1. "High Enough" (RAC Remix) – 3:28
- Digital download – (Slowed)
1. "High Enough" (Slowed) – 3:21

== Personnel ==
Credits for "High Enough" adapted from Apple Music.

Musicians
- K.Flay – vocals, guitar
- Mike Elizondo – bass, programming, guitar, synthesizer
Production
- Elizondo – production
- Brent Arrowood – recording engineering
- Adam Hawkins – mixing, recording engineering
- Joe LaPorta – mastering

== Charts ==
Chart performance for "High Enough"
Chart (2017)	Peak position
US Alternative Airplay (Billboard)	4

== Certifications ==
Region	Certification	Certified units/sales
Brazil (Pro-Música Brasil)	Gold	30,000^{‡}
France (SNEP)	Gold	100,000^{‡}
Poland (ZPAV)	2× Platinum	100,000^{‡}
United Kingdom (BPI)	Gold	400,000^{‡}
United States (RIAA)	Platinum	1,000,000^{‡}
^{‡} Sales+streaming figures based on certification alone.
