= Shazam! Fury of the Gods (soundtrack) =

2023 film soundtrack album

Shazam! Fury of the Gods (Original Motion Picture Soundtrack)

Film score by Christophe Beck
- Released: March 10, 2023
- Recorded: 2022–2023
- Studios: Sony Scoring Stage, Culver City, California; Evergreen Studios, Burbank, California
- Genre: Film score
- Length: 60:25
- Label: WaterTower
- Producer: Christophe Beck

Christophe Beck chronology
Ant-Man and the Wasp: Quantumania (2023)	Shazam! Fury of the Gods (Original Motion Picture Soundtrack) (2023)	Nimona (2023)

Singles from Shazam! Fury of the Gods (Original Motion Picture Soundtrack)
- 1. "Shazam! Fury of the Gods (Main Title Theme)" Released: February 23, 2023

Shazam! Fury of the Gods (Original Motion Picture Soundtrack) is the score album composed by Christophe Beck, to the 2023 film of the same name, the sequel to Shazam! (2019) and the 12th installment in the DC Extended Universe (DCEU). The album featured 28 tracks and was released on March 10, 2023, by WaterTower Music.

== Background ==
The original score is composed by Christophe Beck, in his maiden collaboration with David F. Sandberg. Michael Paraskevas, who had assisted Beck in composing the score for the Marvel miniseries Hawkeye (2021), wrote additional music for this film. Beck and Paraskevas replaced Benjamin Wallfisch, Sandberg's norm collaborator, who scored for the first film, as the latter could not return due to scheduling conflicts due to his commitments on The Flash. Sandberg chose Beck as "he was very much well versed with the universe of superheroes" had scored several films and television series from the Marvel Cinematic Universe (MCU), including the Ant-Man films. He further gave freedom to explore the textures to create the music and did not want him to follow the elements from the first film, so that he could work on new sounds to make the film sonically beautiful. He began scoring for the film by June 2022. A single titled "Shazam! Fury of the Gods (Main Title Theme)" was released as a digital single by WaterTower Music on February 23, 2023, and the soundtrack album was released on March 10.

== Track listing ==
Shazam! Fury of the Gods (Original Motion Picture Soundtrack)
No.	Title	Length
1.	"Shazam! Fury of the Gods (Main Title Theme)"	3:06
2.	"Introduction – Fright at the Museum"	4:32
3.	"Daughters of Atlas"	3:20
4.	"Steve"	1:14
5.	"Freddy Over Heels"	1:50
6.	"Dome and Gloom"	4:17
7.	"Freddy Sneaks In"	1:21
8.	"Act of Violins"	1:04
9.	"The Guardian"	2:57
10.	"A Family Affair"	2:42
11.	"Dragon Drop"	2:09
12.	"Philly Tree's Take"	2:08
13.	"I Chose Right"	3:22
14.	"Before You Go"	1:41
15.	"Dragon Chase"	0:57
16.	"You Disobeyed Me"	2:30
17.	"Lightning in a Bottle"	1:49
18.	"Unicorn Act"	2:21
19.	"Taste the Rainbow"	1:19
20.	"Garage Showdown"	1:32
21.	"Freddy Resists"	1:15
22.	"Crack of Dome"	1:59
23.	"All or None"	2:24
24.	"We End This Now"	2:13
25.	"A True God After All"	1:18
26.	"Restoration"	1:13
27.	"Hero"	2:36
28.	"Changing of the Garden"	1:16
Total length:		60:25

== Additional music ==
In addition to Beck's score, the other songs that are featured in the film, includes "Holding Out For A Hero" by Bonnie Tyler, "A-O-K" by Tai Verdes, "This Must Be The Place" by Sure Sure, "Sabotage" by Beastie Boys, "Superbloom" by MisterWives, and "A Little Less Conversation" by Elvis Presley (JXL Radio Edit Remix), with the latter playing during the end credits. Additionally the tracks "Check Out These Guns" from Shazam! (2019) by Benjamin Wallfisch and Wonder Woman's theme "Is She With You?" from Batman v Superman: Dawn of Justice (2016) by Hans Zimmer and Junkie XL are featured.

== Reception ==
Jonathan Broxton wrote "What's true is that Christophe Beck and his team have written an earnest, fitting, tonally appropriate score for Shazam: Fury of the Gods, which hits all the right buttons, occasionally soars, and will certainly appeal to fans of the franchise in general and this film in particular, but also somehow it feels curiously subdued and run of the mill, and is likely destined to get lost in 2023's over-crowded superhero extravaganza market." Shane Romanchick of Collider mentioned that the flavor of the score is inspired by John Williams' score — including the main title theme — for Richard Donner's Superman (1978). He further added, in few themes, "there's a mythical weight to the score that feels appropriate for this kind of gods and monsters story involving dragons, unicorns, and revenge seeking Demigods". Filmtracks.com wrote "For most people, Shazam! Fury of the Gods will sound like a two-theme score, and that observation is largely correct. But Beck potentially frustrates by saving his most engaging melodic ideas for secondary themes that never gain enough traction in the work to satisfy. The general musical narrative of the two major themes is fine, but their intermingling is not as adept as one might hope during scenes of direct conflict."

== Credits ==
Credits adapted from AllMusic

- Score composer and producer: Christophe Beck
- Recording: Greg Hayes
- Mixing: Casey Stone
- Mastering: Bob Ludwig
- Additional music: Michael Paraskevas, Carlos Garcia
- Music contractor and co-ordinator: Peter Rotter
- Choir contractor: Jasper Randall
- Conductor: Tim Davies
