= Free Guy (soundtrack) =

2021 soundtrack albums

The music to the 2021 action comedy film Free Guy featured two musical projects: an original soundtrack consisted of songs featured in the film and an album consisting of the original score composed by Christophe Beck. Both albums were released on the same date as the film (August 13, 2021) through Hollywood Records.

== Free Guy (Music from the Motion Picture) ==
Free Guy (Music from the Motion Picture)

Soundtrack album by various artists
- Released: August 11, 2021
- Genre: Film soundtrack
- Length: 43:38
- Label: Hollywood

Free Guy (Music from the Motion Picture) is the soundtrack accompanying the songs featured in the film as well as three tracks from the film's original score composed by Christophe Beck. The soundtrack was released digitally by Hollywood Records on August 11, 2021 followed by a vinyl edition that released two days later.

=== Background ===
Most of the songs were curated by Shawn Levy were from 1950s and 1960s, handpicked by Ryan Reynolds whom Levy described his musical taste as "quirky, weird, inspired". Levy had originally intended to use the song "Your Love" by the Outfield, but Reynolds suggested using "Fantasy" by Mariah Carey instead as the song had a "joyous, buoyant spirit to it". Reynolds discussed to Carey on obtaining permission to use it and she allowed them to use the song throughout the film. A cover version of "Fantasy" sung by Comer was also used in the film, albeit not included in the soundtrack.

=== Track listing ===
No.	Title	Artist(s)	Length
1.	"Fantasy"	Mariah Carey	4:03
2.	"Legendz"	A.G. feat. Devvon Terrell	2:08
3.	"100 Miles and Running"	Logic feat. Wale and John Lindahl	5:54
4.	"The Humpty Dance"	Digital Underground	6:31
5.	"Cheek To Cheek"	Fred Astaire	3:17
6.	"Make Your Own Kind of Music" (Single Version)	Cass Elliot	2:20
7.	"Can't Take My Eyes Off You"	Frankie Valli	3:21
8.	"Ain't No Stoppin' Us Now" (Single Version)	McFadden & Whitehead	3:44
9.	"Theme from The Greatest American Hero (Believe It or Not)"	Joey Scarbury	3:14
10.	"Don't Have a Good Day, Have a Great Day"	Christophe Beck	1:57
11.	"It's All a Lie"	Beck	2:19
12.	"Millie"	Beck	2:23
13.	"Go Time"	Beck	2:27
Total length:			43:38

=== Release history ===
Release dates and formats for Free Guy (Music from the Motion Picture)
Region	Date	Format(s)	Label	Ref.
Various	August 11, 2021	Digital download; streaming	Hollywood	
Various	August 13, 2021	Vinyl	Hollywood	

== Free Guy (Original Score) ==
Free Guy (Original Score)

Film score by Christophe Beck
- Released: August 13, 2021
- Recorded: 2020–2021
- Genre: Film score
- Length: 42:24
- Label: Hollywood

Christophe Beck chronology
WandaVision (2021)	Free Guy (2021)	Hawkeye (2021)

Free Guy (Original Score) is the score album composed by Christophe Beck. It was released on August 13, 2021 alongside the film. Beck sampled his score composed for the Disney animated short Paperman (2012) for few sequences.

=== Track listing ===
No.	Title	Length
1.	"Have a Great Day"	2:38
2.	"Cappuccino"	1:28
3.	"Sunglasses"	2:30
4.	"About to Get Shot"	2:52
5.	"A New Day"	1:15
6.	"Stash House Fail"	1:15
7.	"Two Glocks"	2:13
8.	"Ice Cream"	2:30
9.	"Guy's Guise"	2:10
10.	"It's All a Lie"	2:19
11.	"Rebooted"	2:01
12.	"I Remember Everything"	2:01
13.	"On Strike"	1:22
14.	"This Ends Now"	2:28
15.	"It's Go Time"	1:25
16.	"Hitman's Beach"	2:28
17.	"Getting Hectic"	1:47
18.	"Dude"	1:31
19.	"Tables Turn"	1:06
20.	"Reunited"	3:23
21.	"Life Itself"	1:42
Total length:		42:24

=== Reception ===
In a three-star review, James Southall of Movie Wave described it as "an entertaining, easy album to listen to". Jonathan Broxton of Movie Music UK described it as "a nice memento of a really good film". Filmtracks.com wrote "The 42-minute score on album is smartly effortless but wholly anonymous, just like Guy, and casual listeners might be better served by the film's song compilation album containing four assembled tracks from Beck's score."
