= Every Where Is Some Where =

Studio album by K.Flay
- Released: April 7, 2017
- Genres: Electro; pop rock
- Length: 39:51
- Labels: Interscope; Night Street
- Producers: Tommy English; Mike Elizondo; JT Daly; Simon Says

K.Flay chronology
Crush Me (2016)	Every Where Is Some Where (2017)	Solutions (2019)

Singles from Everywhere Is Some Where
- 1. "Blood in the Cut" Released: August 19, 2016; 2. "Black Wave" Released: February 3, 2017; 3. "High Enough" Released: March 10, 2017; 4. "Giver" Released: September 20, 2017; 5. "Slow March" Released: May 1, 2018

Every Where Is Some Where is the second and major label debut studio album by American alternative hip hop recording artist K.Flay. The album was released on April 7, 2017 by Interscope Records and Dan Reynolds' imprint Night Street Records, being the first artist signed to the latter as well as the first album released. The album is preceded by the singles "Blood in the Cut", "Black Wave" and "High Enough". The tracks "Blood in the Cut", "Dreamers", "You Felt Right" and "Hollywood Forever" were previously released on the Crush Me EP. A deluxe edition of the album was released January 12, 2018 with the five songs from the Seattle Sessions EP.

== In popular culture ==
- "Blood in the Cut" is featured in the BoJack Horseman episode "Stupid Piece of Sh*t", the announcement trailer for Forza Motorsport 7, the pilot episode of Impulse, the Animal Kingdom episode "Forgive Us Our Trespasses", the Billions episode "Redemption", and the soundtrack of NBA 2K17.
- "Black Wave" is featured in the racing games Need for Speed Payback and Asphalt 9: Legends, along with the trailer for Assassination Nation.
- "High Enough" is featured in the Riverdale episode "Chapter Nineteen: Death Proof".
- "Giver" is featured in the Riverdale episode "Chapter Fifty: American Dreams".

== Reception ==
Professional ratings
Aggregate scores
Source	Rating
Metacritic	67/100
Review scores
Source	Rating
AllMusic	positive
Alternative Press	4/5 stars
Kerrang!	3/5 stars
Q	3/5 stars
Rock Sound	8/10
The Skinny	2/5 stars

At Metacritic, which assigns a normalized rating out of 100 to reviews from mainstream publications, it received an average score of 67, based on 5 reviews.

The album received two nominations for the 2018 Grammy Awards, for Best Engineered Album, Non-Classical and for Best Rock Song ("Blood in the Cut").

== Track listing ==
Credits obtained from Qobuz.

No.	Title	Writer(s)	Producer(s)	Length
1.	"Dreamers"	Kristine Flaherty; Simon Rosen	Simon Says	3:34
2.	"Giver"	Flaherty; Nate Campany; Kyle Shearer	Tommy English	3:34
3.	"Blood in the Cut"	Flaherty; Justin Daly	JT Daly	3:09
4.	"Champagne"	Flaherty; Daly	Daly	2:12
5.	"High Enough"	Flaherty	Mike Elizondo	3:51
6.	"Black Wave"	Flaherty; Dan Wilson; Thomas Schleiter	English	3:38
7.	"Mean It"	Flaherty	Elizondo	3:25
8.	"Hollywood Forever"	Flaherty; Daly	Daly	3:04
9.	"The President Has a Sex Tape"	Flaherty	English	2:51
10.	"It's Just a Lot"	Flaherty	English	3:24
11.	"You Felt Right"	Flaherty; Daly	Daly	3:21
12.	"Slow March"	Flaherty; Daly; Daniel Kyriakides; Tom Peyton	Daly	3:44
Total length:				39:51

== Charts ==
Chart (2017)	Peak position
Canadian Albums (Billboard)	50
US Billboard 200	118
US Heatseekers Albums (Billboard)	1

== Certifications ==
Region	Certification	Certified units/sales
Poland (ZPAV)	Gold	10,000^{‡}
^{‡} Sales+streaming figures based on certification alone.
