= Real Emotion (album) =

Studio album by Paper Route
- Released: September 23, 2016
- Genre: Indie rock
- Length: 56:00
- Label: Kemosabe/Sony Music
- Producer: Paper Route; Robert Marvin (exec.)

Paper Route chronology
The Peace of Wild Things (2012)	Real Emotion (2016)

Singles from Real Emotion
- 1. "Laugh About It" Released: 2016; 2. "Chariots" Released: June 10, 2016; 3. "Balconies" Released: September 2, 2016

Real Emotion is the third full-length studio album by Paper Route, released on September 23, 2016. The song "Chariots" was featured on the soundtrack for EA Sports game FIFA 17 and was used as the exclusive gameplay trailer track. "Writing on the Wall" is featured on the soundtrack for NBA 2K17. On February 2, 2017, Paper Route made their late night TV debut, performing their newest single, "Balconies," on NBC's Late Night with Seth Meyers.

Professional ratings
Review scores
Source	Rating
AllMusic	4/5 stars
The Huffington Post	(very favorable)

== Track listing ==
No.	Title	Writer(s)	Length
1.	"Intro"	JT Daly, Chad Howat, Nick Aranda	0:43
2.	"Writing on the Wall"	Daly, Howat, Aranda, Nate Campany	3:08
3.	"Pretend"	Daly, Howat, Aranda	3:40
4.	"Chariots"	Daly, Howat, Aranda, Campany	4:36
5.	"Untitled"	Daly, Howat, Aranda	4:09
6.	"Blue Collar Daydream"	Daly, Howat, Aranda, Campany, Paul Moak, Gavin McDonald	1:53
7.	"Real Emotion"	Daly, Howat, Aranda	4:40
8.	"Mona Lisa"	Daly, Howat, Aranda, Trent Dabbs, Robert Marvin	3:47
9.	"Second Place"	Daly, Howat, Aranda	4:44
10.	"Laugh About It"	Daly, Howat, Aranda	3:28
11.	"Lara"	Daly, Howat, Aranda	1:15
12.	"Zhivago"	Daly, Howat, Aranda	3:03
13.	"Bleary"	Daly, Howat, Aranda	4:10
14.	"Balconies"	Daly, Howat, Aranda	4:14
15.	"Love Is Red (with Every Shade Of Blue)"	Daly, Howat, Aranda	2:33
16.	"Vanisher"	Daly, Howat, Aranda, McDonald	5:27

== Personnel ==
Paper Route

- JT Daly
- Chad Howat
- Nick Aranda

Studio Musicians

- Darren King (drums: tracks 2, 4, 9, 14, 16)
- London Community Gospel Choir (choir vocals: tracks 1, 5, 8)
- Joel Plotnik (drums: track 3)
- Scott Soifer (drums: track 7)
- Jordan Meredith Daly (additional vocals: track 15)

Production

- Paper Route - production, engineering, mixing, programming
- Joe LaPorta - mastering
- Tony Hoffer - mixing (tracks 2, 4, 14)
- Robert Marvin - production, mixing, engineering
- Darrell Thorp - engineering
- Luke Vander Pol - engineering
- Jonny MacIntosh - engineering
- Michael Brauer at Electric Lady Studios - mixing (tracks 5, 9)
- Manny Marroquin at Larrabee Studios - mixing (tracks 8, 12)
- Allister Ann - Photography
- Micah Bell - Album Packaging
