= Life as a Dog =

Studio album by K.Flay
- Released: June 10, 2014
- Genres: Hip hop; indie rock
- Length: 44:36
- Label: Bummer Picnic
- Producers: K. Flay; Nate Campany; Billboard; Lincoln Jesser; David Singer-Vine; Sam Spiegel; Justyn Pilbrow; Julien Martinez; Lennon Bone

K.Flay chronology
What If It Is? (2013)	Life as a Dog (2014)	Crush Me (2016)

Singles from Life as a Dog
- 1. "Thicker Than Dust" Released: June 25, 2014; 2. "Everyone I Know" Released: August 15, 2014; 3. "Make Me Fade" Released: October 24, 2014; 4. "Can't Sleep" Released: May 16, 2015

Life as a Dog is the debut studio album by American hip hop recording artist K.Flay. The album was announced in April 2014 and was funded by fans through PledgeMusic. The album was released to consumers who crowd funded the album on June 10, 2014 and was released via digital distribution on June 24, 2014.

== Reception ==
Professional ratings
Review scores
Source	Rating
AllMusic	3/5 stars
The Spill Magazine	10/10
Sputnikmusic	3.5/5

The San Francisco Chronicle said of the album "The new songs are colored with do-or-die inspiration, mixing her rapid-fire verses with sleek melodies and intricate electronic arrangements." Entertainment Weekly stated that the album "pairs spaced-out rap beats and chiming indie rock that K.Flay tops with her frequently tricky flows, making a chocolate-in-my-peanut-butter situation that should please rap-loving indie rockers, or the other way around"

"Can't Sleep" is featured in the 2021 film The Suicide Squad. "Get It Right" was featured in an advertising campaign for the German beer brand König Pilsener.

== Track listing ==
All tracks are written by Kristine Flaherty.

Life as a Dog track listing
No.	Title	Producer(s)	Length
1.	"Everyone I Know"	K.Flay	4:05
2.	"Make Me Fade"	Nate Campany; Billboard; K.Flay	4:06
3.	"Can't Sleep"	Lincoln Jesser; David Singer-Vine; K.Flay	4:12
4.	"Wishing It Was You"	Sam Spiegel; K.Flay	3:23
5.	"Fever"	Justyn Pilbrow; K.Flay	4:19
6.	"Bad Things"	Justyn Pilbrow; K.Flay	4:20
7.	"I'm Good"	Justyn Pilbrow; K.Flay	4:03
8.	"Turn It Around"	Justine Martinez; K.Flay	3:45
9.	"Thicker Than Dust"	Justyn Pilbrow; K.Flay	4:01
10.	"Time For You"	K.Flay	4:05
11.	"Get It Right"	Lennon Bone; K.Flay; Julien Martinez	4:17
Total length:			44:36

== Charts ==
Chart (2017)	Peak position
US Billboard 200	133
US Top Rap Albums (Billboard)	14
US Heatseekers Albums (Billboard)	2
US Independent Albums (Billboard)	1
