= The Peace of Wild Things =

Studio album by Paper Route
- Released: September 11, 2012
- Genre: Indie rock; alternative rock
- Length: 41:47
- Label: Tree of Hearts
- Producer: Paper Route, Robert Marvin

Paper Route chronology
Absence (2009)	The Peace of Wild Things (2012)	Real Emotion (2016)

Singles from The Peace of Wild Things
- 1. "Better Life" Released: November 1, 2011; 2. "You and I" Released: August 14, 2012

Professional ratings
Review scores
Source	Rating
Absolutepunk.net	(84%)
Jesusfreakhideout	4.5/5 stars

The Peace of Wild Things is the second full-length studio album by Paper Route, released on September 11, 2012.

The vinyl LP version was pressed at United Record Pressing in Nashville, TN.

== Track listing ==
All tracks are written by Paper Route.

No.	Title	Length
1.	"Love Letters"	3:40
2.	"Two Hearts"	3:31
3.	"Better Life"	4:46
4.	"Glass Heart Hymn"	4:54
5.	"Sugar"	4:19
6.	"You and I"	3:23
7.	"Letting You Let Go"	4:22
8.	"Tamed"	2:18
9.	"Rabbit Holes"	5:41
10.	"Calm My Soul"	3:40

iTunes bonus tracks
No.	Title	Length
11.	"Born in Love"	4:03

== Charts ==
Chart (2012)	Position
New Zealand Albums (RMNZ)	34
US Billboard 200	164
US Heatseekers Albums (Billboard)	8
US Independent Albums (Billboard)	40
