= Absence (Paper Route album) =

Studio album by Paper Route
- Released: April 28, 2009
- Genre: Synthpop, alternative dance, indie rock, shoegaze
- Length: 49:57
- Label: Universal Motown

Paper Route chronology
A Thrill of Hope EP (2008)	Absence (2009)	The Peace of Wild Things (2012)

Singles from Absence
- 1. "Carousel" Released: 2009; 2. "Gutter" Released: 2010

Professional ratings
Review scores
Source	Rating
Absolutepunk.net	(89%)
AllMusic	3/5 stars
Aversion.com	3/5 stars
Andy Tuck	4.5/5 stars
Billboard	favorable
Jesus Freak Hideout	4.5/5 stars

Absence is the debut full-length studio album by Paper Route, released on April 28, 2009.

== Track listing ==
No.	Title	Length
1.	"Enemy Among Us"	4:45
2.	"Wish"	3:51
3.	"Carousel"	3:31
4.	"Good Intentions"	3:32
5.	"Tiger Teeth"	4:46
6.	"Be Healed"	4:13
7.	"Last Time"	5:24
8.	"No Sudden Revelations"	3:21
9.	"Gutter"	4:02
10.	"Are We All Forgotten"	3:40
11.	"Lovers' Anthem"	3:02
12.	"Dance on Our Graves"	5:57

iTunes bonus track
No.	Title	Length
13.	"Have You Fallen Asleep"	2:48

Pre-order bonus track
No.	Title	Length
13.	"In the Morning"	5:06

== Charts ==
Chart (2009)	Position
US Heatseekers Albums (Billboard)	13
