= Solutions (album) =

Studio album by K.Flay
- Released: July 12, 2019
- Length: 36:48
- Labels: Interscope; Night Street
- Producers: JT Daly; Tommy English; Joel Little; CJ Baran

K.Flay chronology
| Every Where Is Some Where (2017) | Solutions (2019) | Inside Voices / Outside Voices (2022) |

Singles from Solutions
- 1. "Bad Vibes" Released: March 1, 2019; 2. "This Baby Don't Cry" Released: April 29, 2019; 3. "Sister" Released: July 30, 2019; 4. "Not In California" Released: September 23, 2019

Professional ratings
Review scores
| Source | Rating |
|---|---|
| Dork | 5/5 stars |
| The Guardian | 3/5 stars |
| Under the Radar | 7.5/10 |

Solutions is the third studio album by American musician K.Flay, released by Interscope Records and its imprint Night Street Records on July 12, 2019. The first single, "Bad Vibes", was released on March 1, 2019. Lyric videos were also released for "This Baby Don't Cry", "Sister", and "Not in California".

== Background ==
K.Flay wrote "Not in California" after visiting Stinson Beach, California, a place that she thought "seemed to be untouched by the problems of modern society".

== Track listing ==
| No. | Title | Writer(s) | Producer(s) | Length |
|---|---|---|---|---|
| 1. | "I Like Myself (Most of the Time)" | Kristine Flaherty; Justin Thomas Daly | JT Daly | 4:05 |
| 2. | "Bad Vibes" | Flaherty; Thomas Schleiter | Tommy English | 3:05 |
| 3. | "This Baby Don't Cry" | Flaherty; Dan Reynolds; Schleiter | Tommy English | 3:04 |
| 4. | "Sister" | Flaherty; Joel Little; Scott Harris | Little | 3:25 |
| 5. | "Nervous" | Flaherty; Daly | JT Daly | 3:45 |
| 6. | "Good News" | Flaherty; Schleiter | Tommy English | 3:31 |
| 7. | "Ice Cream" | Flaherty; Daly | JT Daly | 3:43 |
| 8. | "Not in California" | Flaherty; Nick Long; Schleiter | Tommy English | 3:37 |
| 9. | "Only the Dark" | Flaherty; CJ Baran | CJ Baran | 3:54 |
| 10. | "DNA" | Flaherty; Nick Long; Schleiter | Tommy English | 4:39 |
| Total length: | | | | 36:48 |

== Charts ==
| Chart (2019) | Peak position |
|---|---|
| Australian Digital Albums (ARIA) | 43 |
