= Inside Voices / Outside Voices =

Studio album by K.Flay
- Released: February 4, 2022
- Genre: Indie rock; pop punk; hip hop
- Length: 39:34
- Label: BMG
- Producer: K.Flay; Jason Suwito; JT Daly; Matias Mora; Mitch Allan; Nick Long; Noah Breakfast; Ryan Spraker; Tim Randolph; Tommy English; Travis Barker

K.Flay chronology
Solutions (2019)	Inside Voices / Outside Voices (2022)	Mono (2023)

Singles from Inside Voices / Outside Voices
- 1. "Four Letter Words" Released: April 23, 2021; 2. "TGIF" Released: June 9, 2021; 3. "Nothing Can Kill Us" Released: October 15, 2021; 4. "Weirdo" Released: November 17, 2021

Inside Voices / Outside Voices is the fourth studio album by American singer, songwriter, and rapper K.Flay. The album was released on February 4, 2022 by BMG Rights Management, and includes tracks from K.Flay's previous Inside Voices and Outside Voices extended plays, in addition to two exclusive tracks, "The Muck" and "Good to Drive". It features Travis Barker and Tom Morello.

== Background ==
On November 10, 2022, the album was released in the format of a vinyl LP. The two EPs and album received mainly positive reviews.

Inside Voices / Outside Voices spawned a thirteen-stop tour entitled The Inside Voices / Outside Voices Tour, which lasted from February 10, 2022, to April 9. In addition, a second month-long tour was announced, entitled K.Flay: Fall Tour, but it was cancelled due to her then-recent diagnosis of sensorineural hearing loss and labyrinthitis.

=== Concept and themes ===
In an interview with Alternative Press, repeated in The Stanford Daily, K.Flay explained that Inside Voices represents the id, while Outside Voices represents the ego, and that her thought process was "can I put together two bodies of work that represent these disparate parts of our psyche?"

This major stylistic choice is represented in the album sleeve and promotional artwork for the singles, which feature two distinct cartoon characters. The former is a screaming goblin-like creature with red hair to represent the id; the latter, the ego, is represented by a goth trapped in a glass box.

== Track listing ==
Inside Voices (Inside Voices / Outside Voices - side one)
No.	Title	Writer(s)	Length
1.	"Four Letter Words"	Kristine Flaherty; Thomas Schleiter; Noah Beresin	2:27
2.	"Good Girl"	Flaherty; Tim Randolph; Dan Reynolds	3:10
3.	"Dating My Dad" (featuring Travis Barker)	Flaherty; Mitch Allan; Travis Barker; Mark Landon	3:17
4.	"TGIF" (featuring Tom Morello)	Flaherty; Justin Thomas Daly; Schleiter; Thomas Morello	3:19
5.	"My Name Isn't Katherine"	Flaherty; Daly	3:39
6.	"The Muck"	Flaherty; Matias Mora	3:24

Outside Voices (Inside Voices / Outside Voices - side two)
No.	Title	Writer(s)	Length
7.	"Nothing Can Kill Us"	Flaherty; Taylor Janzen; Jason Suwito	2:50
8.	"I'm Afraid of the Internet"	Flaherty; Nick Long	3:35
9.	"Maybe There's a Way"	Flaherty; Schleiter; Andrew Jackson	3:32
10.	"Weirdo"	Flaherty; Tom Peyton; Ryan Spraker; Frederik Thaae	3:45
11.	"Caramel and Symphonies"	Flaherty; Schleiter; Long	3:46
12.	"Good to Drive"	Flaherty	2:45
Total length:			39:34

== Personnel ==
Technical

- John Greenham - mastering engineer, mixing engineer
- Tess Greenham - assistant mastering engineer, assistant mixing engineer
- Thomas Schleiter - engineer (8–9, 11)
- Jason Suwito - engineer (7–8)
- Michael Freeman - engineer (8)
- Pete Minh - engineer (10)
- Ryan Spraker - engineer (10)

Additional musicians

- Kristine Flaherty - lead vocals, vocals, instruments, guitar (10)
- Jason Suwito - guitar (7–8), bass guitar (8), drums (7–8), drum programming (7), programming (7–8), synthesizers (7–9), production (7–8, 12)
- Thomas Schleiter - guitar (9, 11), bass guitar (9, 11), piano (11), strings (11), synthesizers (11), production (4, 8–9, 11)
- Ryan Spraker - guitar (10), bass guitar (10), production (10)
- Nick Long - vocals (11), guitar (11)
- Noah Beresin - production (1)
- Tim Randolph - production (2)
- Mitch Allan - production (3)
- Mark Landon - production (3)
- Travis Barker - drums (3)
- Tom Morello - guitar (4)
- JT Daly - production (4–5)
- Matias Mora - production (6)
- Tom Peyton - drums (10)
- Frederik Thaae - percussion (10)
- Mike Byrne - drums (11)
