= Feels Like =

Studio album by Bully
- Released: June 25, 2015
- Recorded: 2014
- Studio: Electrical Audio (Chicago, Illinois)
- Genre: Indie rock; alternative rock; grunge
- Length: 27:51
- Label: Startime; Columbia
- Producer: Alicia Bognanno

Bully chronology
Bully (2014)	Feels Like (2015)	Losing (2017)

Singles from Feels Like
- 1. "I Remember" Released: March 11, 2015; 2. "Trying" Released: April 7, 2015; 3. "Too Tough" Released: June 12, 2015

Feels Like is the debut studio album by American rock band Bully, released on June 23, 2015 by Startime International and Columbia Records. The album was produced by Bully frontwoman Alicia Bognanno and recorded in 2014 at Electrical Audio in Chicago.

== Critical reception ==
Professional ratings
Aggregate scores
Source	Rating
AnyDecentMusic?	7.6/10
Metacritic	77/100
Review scores
Source	Rating
AllMusic	3/5 stars
The A.V. Club	B
Exclaim!	8/10
The Guardian	2/5 stars
NME	8/10
Pitchfork	7.8/10
Q	4/5 stars
Rolling Stone	3.5/5 stars
Spin	8/10
Uncut	8/10

Feels Like received generally positive reviews from music critics. At Metacritic, which assigns a normalized rating out of 100 to reviews from professional publications, the album received an average score of 77, based on 19 reviews. In his review for NME, Robert Cooke highlighted Alicia Bognanno's "honest, witty" songwriting and stated that Feels Like "revels in the simplicity of a great pop song while cleverly articulating the everyday truths of 20-something life". Pitchfork's Laura Snapes noted the contrast between the "explosive, rollicking" music and Bognanno's lyrics, which Snapes felt displayed an intimacy comparable to that of "Courtney Barnett or Waxahatchee's Katie Crutchfield". James Oldham of Q wrote that while Bully's heavy influence from 1990s alternative rock is apparent, the album "retains a thrilling freshness" due to Bognanno's "formidable presence", as well as her "taut, confessional" lyrics, whose directness he said complemented the music's "brutal succinctness".

Michael Hann of The Guardian was less enthusiastic, describing Feels Like as "a grab-bag of early-90s alt-rock styles that sounded tired by the mid-90s – and haven't got any fresher since."

== Track listing ==
All tracks are written by Alicia Bognanno.

No.	Title	Length
1.	"I Remember"	1:47
2.	"Reason"	2:46
3.	"Too Tough"	3:17
4.	"Brainfreeze"	2:36
5.	"Trying"	3:53
6.	"Trash"	3:58
7.	"Six"	2:17
8.	"Picture"	2:48
9.	"Milkman"	2:04
10.	"Bully"	2:25
Total length:		27:51

Digital edition bonus track
No.	Title	Length
11.	"Sharktooth"	3:29
Total length:		31:20

== Personnel ==
Credits are adapted from the album's liner notes.

Bully

- Alicia Bognanno – vocals, guitar
- Stewart Copeland – drums
- Reece Lazarus – bass
- Clayton Parker – guitar

Production

- Alicia Bognanno – production, engineering, mixing
- John Golden – mastering
- Jon San Paolo – engineering

Design

- Daniel Topete – photography
- Esther Pearl Watson – cover photography

== Charts ==
Chart (2015)	Peak position
US Heatseekers Albums (Billboard)	10
US Top Rock Albums (Billboard)	34
