= Crush Me =

EP by K.Flay
- Released: August 19, 2016
- Genres: Electro; pop rock
- Length: 13:08
- Labels: Interscope; Night Street
- Producers: JT Daly; Simon Rosen

K.Flay chronology
Life as a Dog (2014)	Crush Me (2016)	Every Where is Some Where (2017)

Singles from Crush Me
- 1. "Blood in the Cut" Released: August 19, 2016

Crush Me is the fourth EP by American alternative hip hop recording artist K.Flay. It was released on August 19, 2016 as her debut release through Interscope Records and the debut release of Imagine Dragons' lead singer Dan Reynolds' imprint, Night Street.

The EP was written and produced by K.Flay, JT Daly, and Simon Rosen. It was preceded by the single "Blood in the Cut". All tracks on the EP would appear on her second and major label debut album Every Where Is Some Where.

== Background and composition ==
K.Flay explained the meaning of the EP in an interview with New York Daily News:

Each song deals with a force that can be emotionally oppressive in some way, crushing. There’s a defiance to each of the tracks. Sort of ‘crush me’ as stated as a challenge — not as an acquiescence to being crushed.

— K.Flay

During shows and the tour she would play, she brought a book along with her where people could write whatever they wanted. The book, titled Crush Me, containing notes from fans, was published August 2017 and inspired the direction of her next album Every Where Is Some Where.

== Track listing ==
Crush Me track listing
No.	Title	Writer(s)	Producer(s)	Length
1.	"Blood in the Cut"	Kristine Flaherty; JT Daly	JT Daly	3:09
2.	"Hollywood Forever"	Flaherty; Daly	Daly	3:04
3.	"Dreamers"	Flaherty; Simon Rosen	Simon Says	3:34
4.	"You Felt Right"	Flaherty; Daly	Daly	3:21
Total length:				13:08

- All song titles are stylized in lowercase letters.

== Charts ==
Chart (2016)	Peak position
US Heatseekers Albums (Billboard)	12
