= Bully (band) =

American rock band

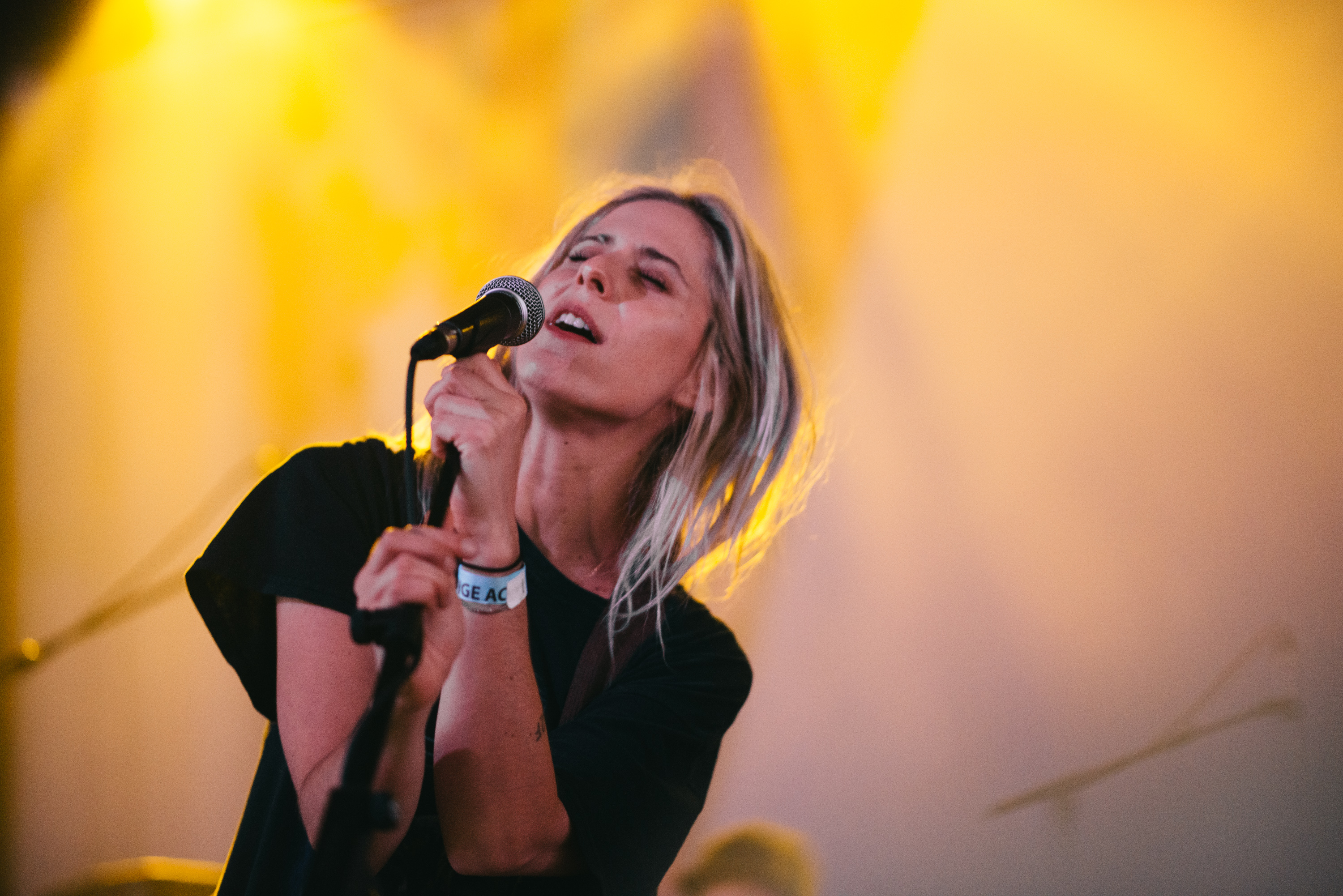

Background information
- Origin: Nashville, Tennessee, U.S.
- Genres: Alternative rock; grunge; punk rock; indie rock
- Years active: 2013–present
- Labels: Startime, Columbia, Sub Pop
- Members: Alicia Bognanno
- Website: bullythemusic.com

Bully originally began as a rock band, formed in 2013 in Nashville, Tennessee. They signed to Columbia Records label Startime International and released their first album, Feels Like, in 2015. The band moved to Sub Pop to release Losing in 2017. Their third album Sugaregg was released on August 21, 2020, and their fourth album Lucky for You was released on June 2, 2023.

== Background ==
Bully was founded by Alicia Bognanno, who was born in Germany and spent her teen years in Rosemount, Minnesota. Bognanno earned a degree from Middle Tennessee State University in audio recording before getting an internship at Steve Albini's Electrical Audio studios in Chicago. She started recording demos of her own material before relocating to Nashville, Tennessee, where she worked as an engineer at Battle Tapes Recording and The Stone Fox venue. She formed Bully in 2013 as a trio, with her then-boyfriend Stewart Copeland on drums (not to be confused with the drummer for The Police) and bassist Reece Lazarus.

After self-releasing a limited cassette, the band's first single proper, "Milkman", was released in April 2014. Later that year, guitarist Clayton Parker was added to the band. They signed with Columbia Records label Startime International and released their debut album Feels Like in June 2015. Feels Like received generally positive reviews from critics. Laura Snapes of Pitchfork wrote, "The coarse Cobain head-scream of Bully singer, songwriter, and guitarist Alicia Bognanno is its own resuscitating jolt of protest... she spends much of Feels Like tearing down the house with her howl."

Shortly after the end of their tour in support of Feels Like, Copeland left the band due to breaking up with Bognanno. When the band returned to the studio in 2016, recording again at Electrical Audio, Copeland was replaced by session drummer Casey Weissbuch. Losing, Bully's second studio album, was released by Sub Pop on October 20, 2017. It was called "grimier and less sugar-slick" than Feels Like.

Following the release of the album, both Lazarus and Parker departed the band – leaving Bognanno as Bully's only member. After some deliberation, Bognanno ultimately opted to continue performing under the moniker. On May 1, 2020, Bully released covers of Nirvana's "About a Girl" and Orville Peck's "Turn to Hate". Of the "About a Girl" cover, Rolling Stone stated "Hearing the Nashville band cover Nirvana is almost too obvious—but, good God, is it glorious. Their spin on 1989's 'About a Girl' strikes a perfect balance of raw and melodic, without ever sounding like the output of a cover band...Still, it's not just a skilled copy of a classic." As for her take on "Turn to Hate", Stereogum wrote "A song that sounds incredible in Bully's rocket-fueled garage rock style." Paste concurred that "Bully's rendition is possibly even better than the original with its incredibly anthemic chorus."

On June 11, 2020, Bully announced their third record Sugaregg, which was released by Sub Pop on August 21, 2020. Bognanno paid homage to Chumbawamba's 1997 song "Tubthumping" when writing the single "Where to Start", which was met with positive reception. On the album's second single "Every Tradition", Bognanno addresses society's expectations for women, while also targeting a specific unnamed individual. In an interview with the New York Times published on August 18, 2020, Bognanno discussed the record, her bipolar II disorder, and the experience of Sugaregg being her first solo project.

In January 2023, it was announced that Bully would be supporting the Pixies, along with Franz Ferdinand, for some June dates during the second leg of their 2023 US Tour. The following month, on February 15, 2023, Bully released their first single in nearly three years: "Lose You", featuring Soccer Mommy. On March 21, 2023, Bully released the single "Days Move Slow" and announced their fourth studio album, Lucky for You, which was released on June 2, 2023.

== Members ==
Current members

- Alicia Bognanno – vocals, guitar (2013–present), bass (2019–present)

Current touring/session musicians

- Wesley Mitchell – drums (2019–present)
- Nick Byrd – bass (2021–present)

Former members

- Stewart Copeland – drums (2013–2016)
- Reece Lazarus – bass (2013–2018)
- Clayton Parker – guitar (2014–2018)

Former touring/session musicians

- Casey Weissbuch – drums (2016–2018)
- Zach Dawes – bass (2019–2021)

== Discography ==
Studio albums

- Feels Like (2015)
- Losing (2017)
- Sugaregg (2020)
- Lucky for You (2023)

EPs

- Bully (2013)
