= Mono (K.Flay album) =

Studio album by K.Flay
- Released: September 15, 2023
- Genre: Indie rock; pop-punk; alternative rock
- Length: 38:10
- Label: Giant Music
- Producer: K.Flay; Pink Slip; Falconry; Dave Hammer; Jeoff Harris; Paul Meany; Rob Nelson

K.Flay chronology
Inside Voices / Outside Voices (2022)	Mono (2023)	I'm Making Friends With The Silence (2024)

Singles from Mono
- 1. "Raw Raw" Released: April 26, 2023; 2. "Shy" Released: June 7, 2023; 3. "Irish Goodbye" Released: August 17, 2023; 4. "Punisher" Released: September 15, 2023; 5. "Carsick" Released: January 11, 2024

Mono (stylized in all caps) is the fifth studio album by American musician K.Flay, released via Giant Music on September 15, 2023. Inspired largely by her 2022 diagnosis of labyrinthitis and subsequent total deafness in her right ear, Mono is primarily a rock album that continues K.Flay's trend of departing from her earlier hip hop sound.

== Overview ==
On April 26, 2023, K.Flay released the album's first track, "Raw Raw", along with its accompanying music video. The track had been teased on her social media pages in the weeks prior to its release. The song heavily features the theme of vulnerability, which K.Flay said was inspired by her 2022 diagnosis of labyrinthitis and sensorineural hearing loss in her right ear. She said, "I wanted to capture what vulnerability really feels like. Outwardly it might seem tender, but on the inside it's messy and bloody and somewhat terrifying. It's a chainsaw buzzing at your throat." In May, she teased the second single "Shy" by playing snippets on Instagram Live and performing the song while on tour with Grandson. The song was released on June 7.

On June 6, the day before "Shy" was released, K.Flay announced that her upcoming album would be called Mono (inspired by her aforementioned deafness) and revealed the album's cover, track list, and release date of September 15.

The third single from the album, "Irish Goodbye", was released on August 17. The fourth single, "Punisher", was released with an animated music video on the same day as the album.

The fifth and final single, "Carsick", previously exclusive to physical editions of the album, was released digitally on January 11, 2024.

On October 15, 2024, K.Flay released slowed down acoustic versions of "Punisher" and "Carsick" from Mono. Soon, alternate versions of "Bar Soap" and "Perfectly Alone" arrived; on November 12, an EP titled I'm Making Friends With the Silence and featuring all six softer versions of Mono songs was released.

== Reception ==
Mono was released to mainly positive reviews. A writer for New Noise Magazine called it an "incredible" record, praising it for being "[K.Flay's] most cohesive and vulnerable album to date".

== Track listing ==
Mono track listing
No.	Title	Writer(s)	Producer(s)	Length
1.	"Are You Serious?"	Kristine Flaherty; Jeoff Harris	K.Flay; Harris	1:35
2.	"Raw Raw"	Flaherty; Jason Suwito; Daniel Armbruster; Bradley Hale	K.Flay	2:57
3.	"Punisher"	Flaherty; Harris; Caroline Pennell	K.Flay; Harris	3:14
4.	"Irish Goodbye" (featuring Vic Fuentes)	Flaherty; Andrew DeCaro; Victor Fuentes; Kyle Buckley; Rob Nelson	K.Flay; Falconry; Nelson; Pink Slip	3:02
5.	"Hustler"	Flaherty; Matthew Bair; Taylor Goldsmith; Paul Meany	K.Flay; Meany	3:11
6.	"Spaghetti" (featuring Kid Sistr)	Flaherty; Sara Keden; Meany	K.Flay; Meany	2:32
7.	"Bar Soap"	Flaherty; David Haddad	K.Flay; Dave Hammer	2:32
8.	"Watch Me Pt. 1"	Flaherty	K.Flay	0:56
9.	"In America"	Flaherty; Haddad	K.Flay; Hammer	2:47
10.	"Shy"	Flaherty; Haddad	K.Flay; Hammer	2:48
11.	"Watch Me Pt. 2"	Flaherty	K.Flay; Meany	1:03
12.	"Chaos is Love"	Flaherty; Haddad	K.Flay; Hammer	2:56
13.	"Yes I'm Serious"	Flaherty; Buckley; Meany	K.Flay; Meany; Nelson	4:56
14.	"Perfectly Alone"	Flaherty; Harris	K.Flay; Harris	3:35
Total length:				38:10

Physical exclusive track
No.	Title	Writer(s)	Producer(s)	Length
2.	"Carsick"	Flaherty; Suwito	K.Flay; Suwito	2:44
Total length:				40:54

2024 digital reissue
No.	Title	Writer(s)	Producer(s)	Length
2.	"Carsick"	Flaherty; Suwito	K.Flay; Suwito	2:44
Total length:				40:54

Notes

- "Yes I'm Serious" interpolates "Are You Serious?"
- "Watch Me Pt. 2" interpolates "Watch Me Pt. 1".
- While originally exclusive to vinyl and CD versions, "Carsick" saw an official single release several months after the rest of the album was made digitally available.

== Personnel ==
- Kyle Buckley – production (track 4)
- Dru DeCaro – production (4)
- Kristine Flaherty – lead vocals, instruments, production; mixing (8)
- Michael Freeman – mixing (1–7, 9, 12–14)
- David Haddad – production (7, 9, 10, 12)
- Jeoff Harris – production (1, 3, 14)
- Aric Improta – drums
- Joe LaPorta – mastering
- Paul Meany – production (5, 6, 11, 13), mixing (11)
- Rob Nelson – production (4)

== Charts ==
Chart (2023)	Peak position
US Heatseekers Albums (Billboard)	8
