= Blood in the Cut =

2016 song by K.Flay

Single by K.Flay

from the album Every Where Is Some Where
- Released: August 19, 2016
- Length: 3:08
- Label: Interscope; Night Street
- Songwriter(s): Kristine Flaherty; JT Daly; Lena Kwan Simon
- Producer(s): Daly

K.Flay singles chronology
"FML" (2016)	"Blood in the Cut" (2016)	"Black Wave" (2017)

Music video
- "Blood in the Cut" on YouTube

"Blood in the Cut" is a song by American musician K.Flay as the lead single from her second studio album Every Where Is Some Where. It was released through Interscope and Night Street Records on August 19, 2016, originally appearing as the first track on K.Flay's fourth EP Crush Me. The song was nominated for Best Rock Song at the 60th Grammy Awards. The song also appears on the soundtrack of the film XXX: Return of Xander Cage and in the BoJack Horseman episode "Stupid Piece of Sh*t".

== Background and composition ==
"Blood in the Cut" was written by K.Flay, JT Daly, and Lena Kwan Simon and produced by Daly. The lyrics of the song describe a breakup and its violent effects. K.Flay further described the background of the song in an interview with IHeartRadio:

"Blood in the Cut" started as a breakup anthem. I wrote the lyrics and the riff in 20 minutes, and I was actually at home for Christmas, so I was in my parents' basement doing that. I was in a somewhat dark emotional place. I wrote that, and I immediately felt filled with this vigor that I had previously been missing. And then producing the song, just embracing that spirit of release in the chorus.

— K.Flay

== Music video ==
The music video for "Blood in the Cut" premiered on September 7, 2016 and was directed by TJ Andrade. The video begins with K.Flay walking from an overturned car unscathed into a diner bathroom. As the chorus comes in, she has a breakdown. She then walks out past a gas station and levitates into the air at the end of a dark street.

== Track listing ==
- Digital download
1. "Blood in the Cut" – 3:08
- Digital download – Remixed
1. "Blood in the Cut" (Aire Atlantica Remix) – 3:19
2. "Blood in the Cut" (Ojivolta Remix) – 3:29
3. "Blood in the Cut" (Awoltalk Remix) – 3:39

== Personnel ==
Credits for "Blood in the Cut" adapted from Apple Music.

Musicians
- K.Flay – vocals
- Seth Cummings – guitar
- JT Daly – keyboards, bass, guitar
Production
- Daly – production, recording engineering
- Aaron Chafin – recording engineering
- Miles Comaskey – mixing
- Tony Maserati – mixing
- Joe LaPorta – mastering
- Josh Lovell – studio technician
- Angela Wooten – studio technician

== Charts ==
Chart performance for "Blood in the Cut"
Chart (2017)	Peak position
US Alternative Airplay (Billboard)	4
US Rock & Alternative Airplay (Billboard)	10

== Certifications ==
Region	Certification	Certified units/sales
Canada (Music Canada)	Gold	40,000^{‡}
United States (RIAA)	Gold	500,000^{‡}
^{‡} Sales+streaming figures based on certification alone.
