= K.Flay =

American musician

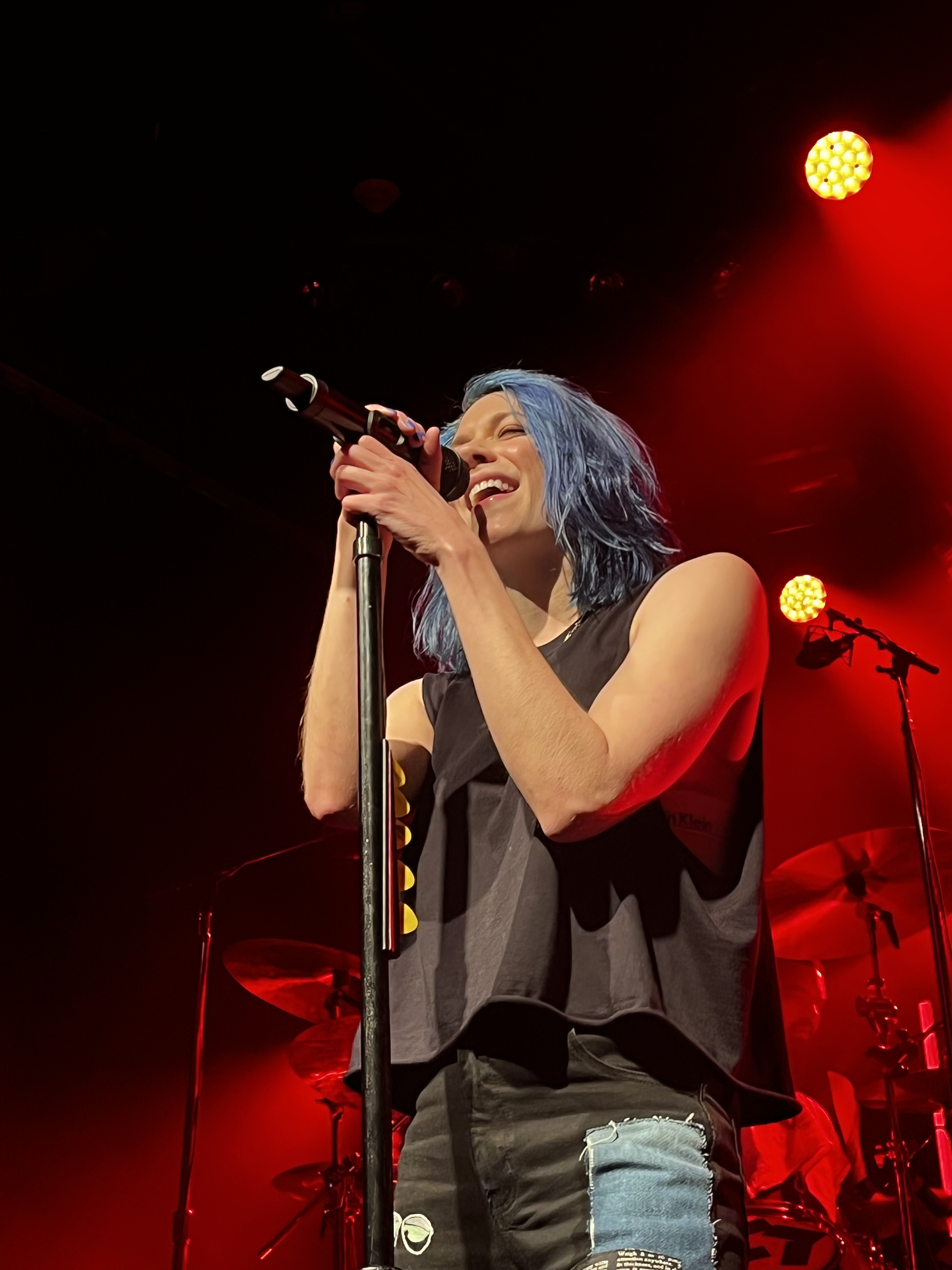
- K.Flay performing in November 2022

Background information
- Born: Kristine Meredith Flaherty; June 30, 1985 (age 41); Wilmette, Illinois, U.S.
- Genres: Hip hop; alternative hip hop; alternative rock; electro; indie rock; pop punk; pop rock
- Occupations: Singer; musician; songwriter; rapper
- Years active: 2003–present
- Labels: BMG; Bummer Picnic; Interscope; Night Street; RCA; Humming Records
- Member of: 2XT
- Website: kflay.com

Kristine Meredith Flaherty (born June 30, 1985), better known as K.Flay, is an American singer, musician, songwriter, and rapper. She has released five studio albums: Life as a Dog (2014), Every Where Is Some Where (2017), Solutions (2019), Inside Voices / Outside Voices (2022), and Mono (2023).

Life as a Dog peaked at No. 2 on Billboard's Heatseekers Albums chart and No. 14 on Billboard's Rap Albums chart. Every Where Is Some Where was nominated for the Grammy Award for Best Engineered Album, Non-Classical, while its lead single "Blood in the Cut" was nominated for the Grammy Award for Best Rock Song. K.Flay is also known for collaborating with artists such as Dune Rats, Grandson, Mike Shinoda, Party Favor, Tom Morello, Travis Barker, Vic Fuentes, Pvris, X Ambassadors, and Evanescence.

== Early life ==
K.Flay was born Kristine Meredith Flaherty in Wilmette, Illinois, on June 30, 1985. She attended New Trier High School.

Flaherty's parents divorced when she was seven years old and her mother soon remarried, bringing in a stepbrother and a stepsister, with her stepfather later adopting her. When she was 14 years old, her biological father died of undisclosed causes related to his alcoholism; many of her songs include references to him. She has described herself as a tomboy during childhood, preferring baggier clothing and rejecting "all things girly". In 2003, she enrolled at Stanford University, pursuing a double major in psychology and sociology. She has said that many people she met at Stanford influenced her musical style.

== Career ==
=== 2003–2013: Self-released material and RCA Records signing ===
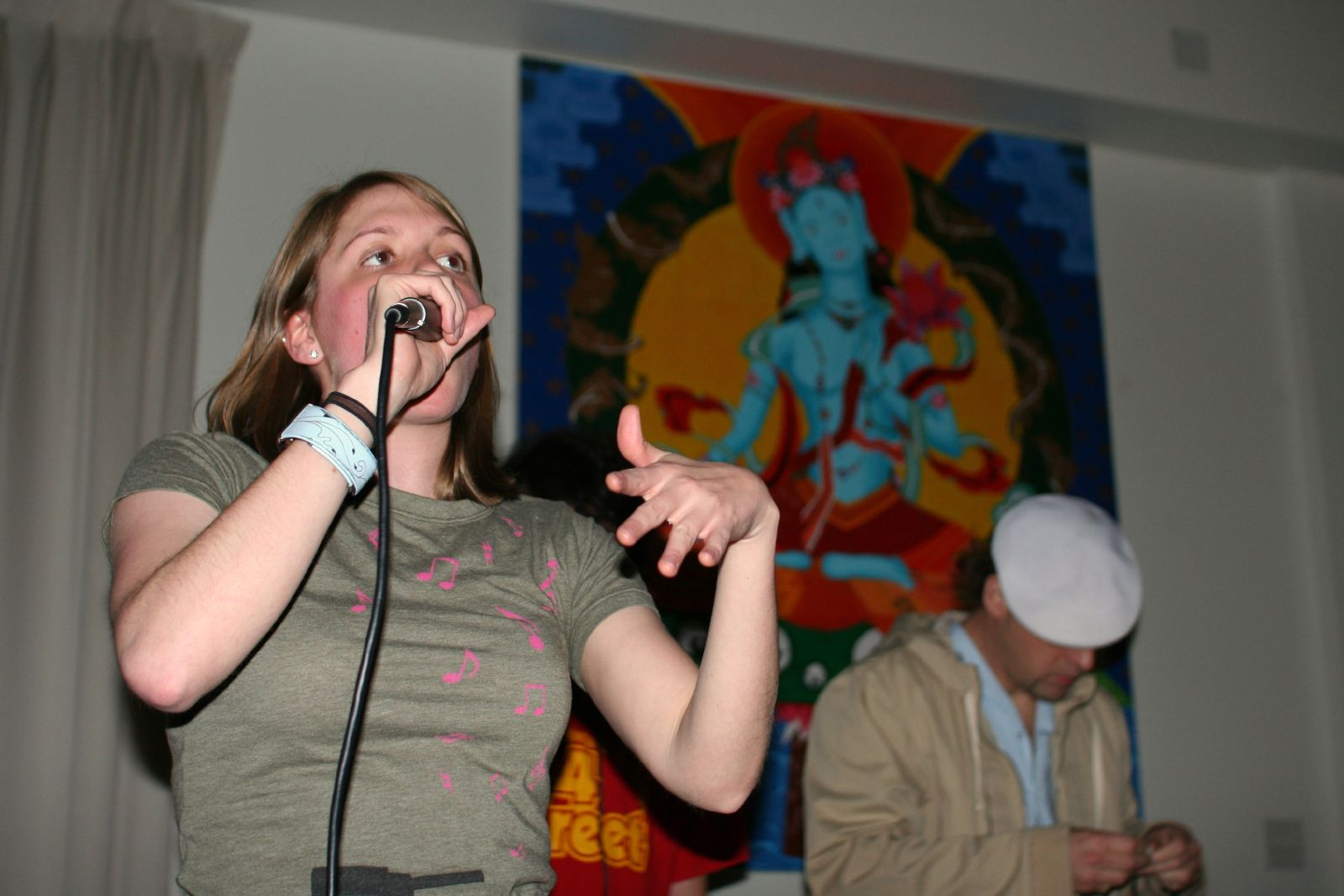
K.Flay rapping at Stanford University in April 2007

K.Flay began creating music while attending Stanford, believing that most hip hop on the radio was misogynistic. After bragging to a friend that she could write similar songs, she wrote "Blingity Blang Blang", which she described as a "low budget rap parody that contained far too many obscenities". After writing and performing the song, Flaherty realized that she enjoyed writing and recording music. She continued to experiment with music by writing songs and performing and recording them on her computer. She released a mixtape called Suburban Rap Queen in 2005, which she produced on her laptop, and began performing. She then independently released the now-unavailable mixtapes [appetite whetting 2.0] and MASHed Potatoes, as well as the EP Single and Famous with MC Lars.

In 2010, K.Flay released her self-titled extended play. A year later, she self-released the mixtape I Stopped Caring in '96, which she later remarked was a turning point for her career. K.Flay signed with RCA Records in 2012, releasing two more EPs, Eyes Shut in 2012, with songs produced by Liam Howlett from the British band the Prodigy, and What If It Is in 2013. She parted ways with RCA Records in 2013 because of differences of opinion. Upon leaving RCA Records, she left behind more than 60 songs she had written while signed but no longer owned the rights to. K.Flay has described her time with RCA Records as similar to "an ill-advised marriage". Her mixtape West Ghost was released in the same year; this release, along with much of her previous independent material, was available for free download on her official website.

=== 2014–2015: Life as a Dog ===
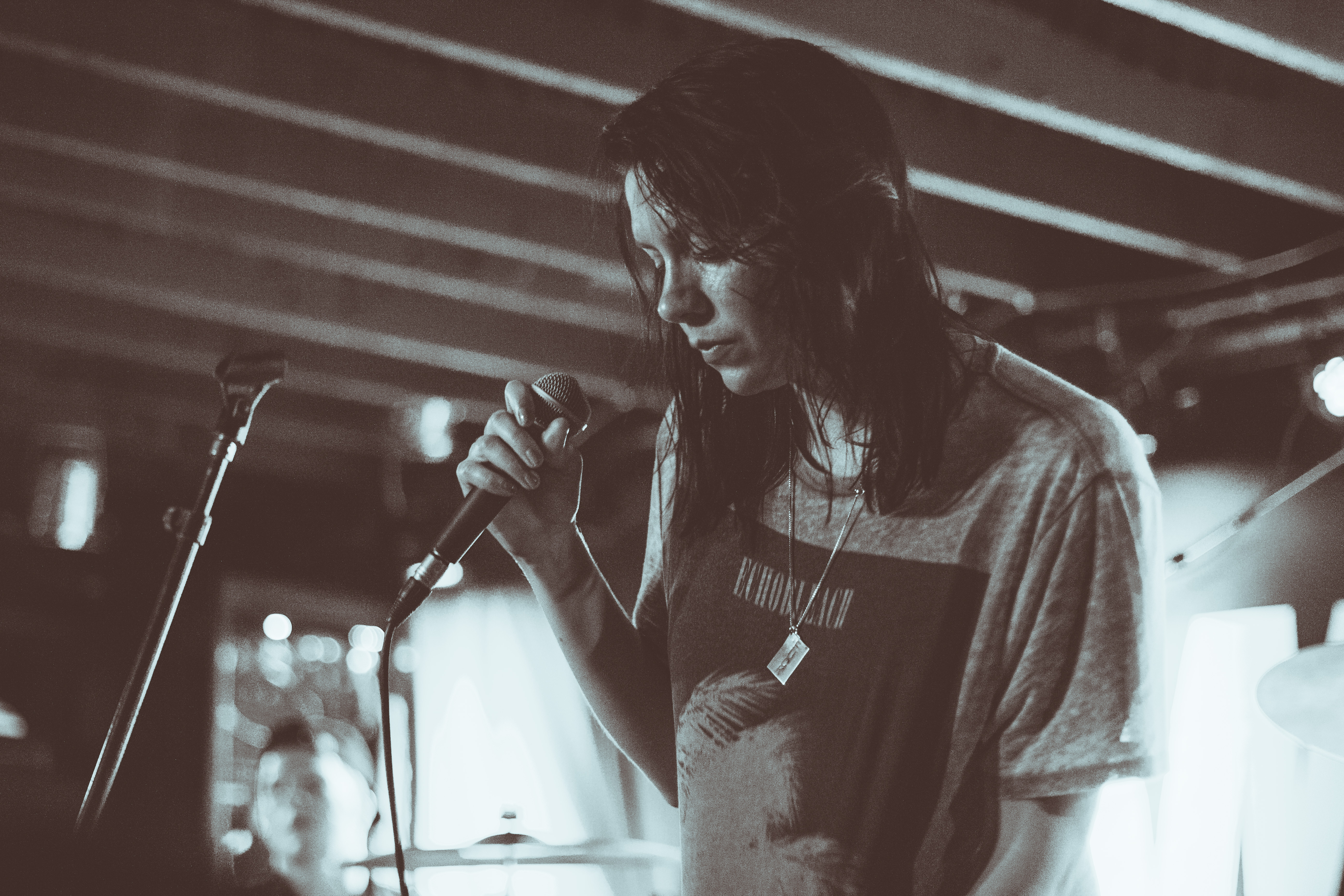
K.Flay in July 2014

In late April 2014, K.Flay announced the release of her album Life as a Dog, by offering fans the ability to pre-order via PledgeMusic, reaching 196 percent of her initial goal. She wanted the project to be "DIY [and] self-motivated". It was recorded and produced in New York City, Los Angeles, and San Francisco, with the final mix produced at San Francisco's Different Fur.

Life as a Dog was released independently on June 10, 2014. The album reached No. 14 on the Billboard Rap Albums chart and No. 2 on the Billboard Heatseekers Albums chart. K.Flay toured extensively once the album was released, including headlining a tour and joining tours with AWOLNATION, Third Eye Blind, and Dashboard Confessional in 2014. In 2014 and 2015 she toured Germany, France, and other European countries.

K.Flay also performed on the Warped Tour in 2014, saying that it "was almost like an exercise in becoming a better performer".

In 2015, K.Flay collaborated with Louis the Child on their song "It's Strange". The single was praised by Taylor Swift, who added "It's Strange" as one of her "Songs That Will Make Life Awesome" list and was featured on the FIFA 16 soundtrack. The song peaked at number 38 on the Billboard Hot Dance/Electronic Songs chart.

=== 2016–2018: Crush Me and Every Where Is Some Where ===
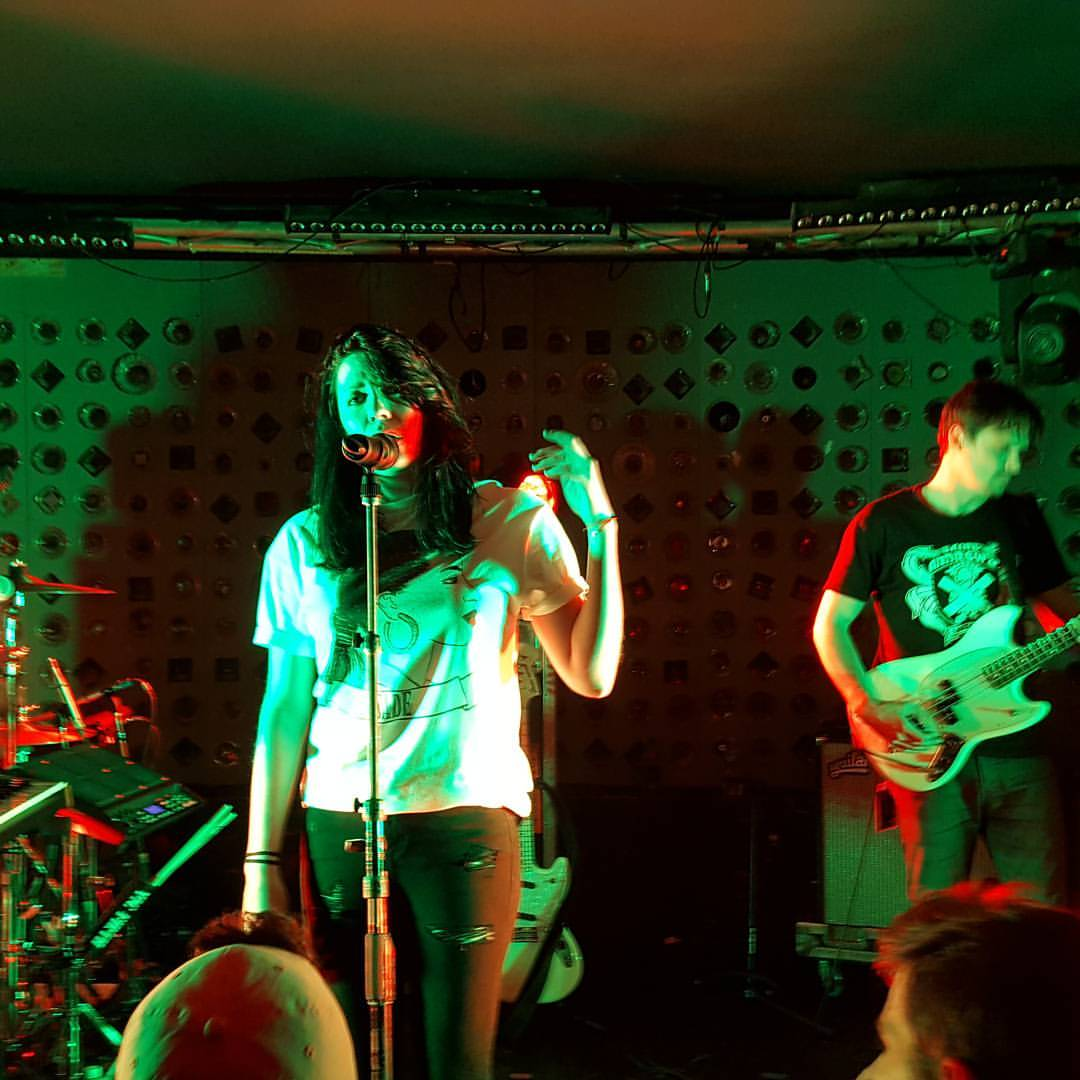
K.Flay in November 2016

On March 25, 2016, K.Flay released her single "FML".

Later that year, K.Flay announced she had signed to Interscope Records as the first artist signed to Dan Reynolds' Night Street Records imprint. Her first release was the EP Crush Me, with the song "Blood in the Cut" appearing on the soundtrack for XXX: Return of Xander Cage, Netflix's original series "Peaky Blinders", as well as BoJack Horseman (season 4, episode 6), and in a 2017 NFL promo commercial drive.

K.Flay's album Every Where Is Some Where was released on April 7, 2017. The album's third single, "High Enough", was released in March 2017. She was the opening act for the North American and European legs of Imagine Dragons' Evolve Tour. In September 2017, Flay released the book Crush Me, a compilation of notes received from fans.

At the 60th Annual Grammy Awards, "Blood in the Cut" received a nomination for Best Rock Song and Every Where Is Some Where was nominated for Best Engineered Album, Non-Classical.

=== 2019–2020: Solutions and Don't Judge a Song by Its Cover ===
On March 1, 2019, K.Flay announced that she was working on her third studio album and released a lyric video for its first single, "Bad Vibes". On March 19, the official music video for "Bad Vibes" was released. The single was also featured in the 2019 video game NHL 20. On April 29, K.Flay revealed that the new album would be titled Solutions and announced the Solutions Tour. The album was released on July 12, 2019.

On May 15, 2020 K.Flay released the song "Zen" with X Ambassadors and Grandson. In December, K.Flay released a three-track EP called Don't Judge a Song by Its Cover which saw her covering "Break Stuff" by Limp Bizkit, "Self Esteem" by The Offspring, and "Brain Stew" by Green Day.

=== 2021–2022: Inside Voices / Outside Voices ===
In April 2021, K.Flay announced that a five-track EP called Inside Voices would be released on June 11. The first song from the EP, "Four Letter Words", was released with a music video on April 23. A second single, "TGIF" featuring Tom Morello of Rage Against the Machine on guitar, was released with an animated visual on May 21.

Later in 2021, K.Flay began livestreaming on Twitch; she uses the platform to interact with fans, host live interviews with other musicians, and create and mix original songs in real time. She also performed at the 2021 Grey Cup halftime show with Arkells and The Lumineers.'' On November 19, she released another five-track EP called Outside Voices. The EP's first single, "Nothing Can Kill Us", was released on October 15; its accompanying music video was released on November 4. A second single, "Weirdo", was released on November 17.

On February 4, 2022, K.Flay released her fourth studio album Inside Voices / Outside Voices. The album combines the Inside Voices and Outside Voices EPs into one album and features two additional tracks called "The Muck" and "Good to Drive". On November 16, she released "It's Been So Long". This was her first release since suffering from a viral infection earlier in the year, which caused her to experience sudden sensorineural hearing loss and labyrinthitis and ultimately led to complete deafness in her right ear. She explained on her social media pages that she wrote the song while recovering from COVID-19 and "isolating in a bedroom above a garage" in Tennessee, and that she "worried [she] wouldn't be able to sing or make music like [she] used to" but that recording the song felt "like a big step forward".

=== 2023–2025: Hearing loss and Mono ===
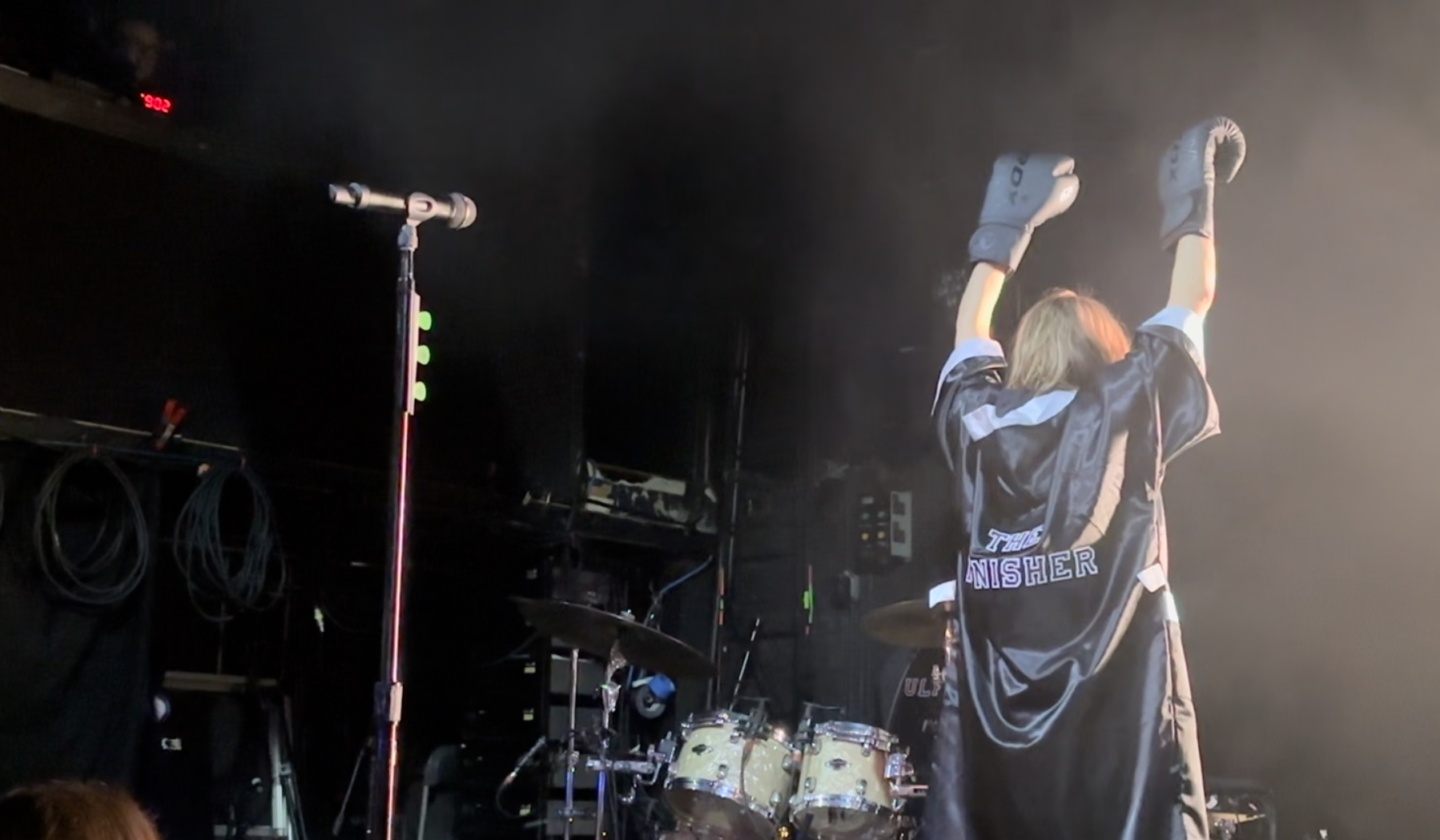
K.Flay performing in March 2024

On April 26, 2023, K.Flay released her first track of the year, "Raw Raw", along with its music video. The track had been teased on her social media pages in the weeks prior to its release. The song heavily features the theme of vulnerability, which she said was inspired by her hearing loss experience: "I wanted to capture what vulnerability really feels like. Outwardly it might seem tender, but on the inside it's messy and bloody and somewhat terrifying. It's a chainsaw buzzing at your throat." In May, she teased her upcoming single "Shy" by playing it while on tour with Grandson and on Instagram Live. On June 6, she announced that her next album would be called Mono and revealed its cover art, track list, and release date. The following day, she released "Shy" with a music video. The third single from the album, "Irish Goodbye", was released on August 17. The album was released on September 15 and received positive reviews, with its overall theme of vulnerability being singled out for praise.

On January 11, 2024, K.Flay released the single "Carsick", which had previously been available only on physical copies of Mono. On November 12, she released the EP I'm Making Friends With The Silence, containing softer versions of six songs from Mono inspired by her experiences with hearing loss.

On June 6, 2025, K.Flay and Amy Lee released the song "Fight Like a Girl", on which they had collaborated for the soundtrack of the John Wick spin-off film Ballerina.

=== 2026-present: 2XT and Special Feelings ===
On February 4, 2026, K.Flay announced her side project 2XT on her official Discord server, which includes fellow musician Jason Suwito from the indie pop band Sir Sly. The first single from the project was "Angel", which was first teased on its own namesake social media accounts, and was released on February 25. It was followed up with "All In", released on April 8. On April 16, it was announced they would release their debut album titled Special Feelings on May 15, which also included pre-orders of vinyl via Bandcamp. The third single, "Ringing In My Head", was released on May 13.

Sonically, the project is a deviation from K.Flay's previous music as it is fully electronic music, with influences from house and dubstep.

== Musical style and influences ==
K.Flay has cited a wide range of musicians such as Royal Blood, Missy Elliott, Garbage, Lauryn Hill, Tame Impala, Jeremih, Metric, M.I.A., OutKast, Liz Phair, Cat Power, and Shlohmo as influences. Her work has covered genres including hip hop, alternative hip hop, indie, and pop rock. She has described her sound as "genre-defying" and draws from lo-fi pop and hip hop with a strong indie component in her sound.

== Personal life ==
Flaherty resides in Los Angeles. She has hinted at being bisexual in her lyrics and interviews, and was in a relationship with fellow musician Miya Folick from 2018 to 2021.

In September 2022, Flaherty revealed that she had recently experienced sudden sensorineural hearing loss and labyrinthitis, causing her to undergo multiple forms of hearing therapy. In October, she revealed that the treatment had been unsuccessful and that she had gone completely deaf in her right ear. After she began releasing music again later that year, she admitted that she was initially concerned about her ability to do so whilst deaf in one ear, but was adapting to the condition. In April 2025, she received a cochlear implant.

== Discography ==
- Life as a Dog (2014)
- Every Where Is Some Where (2017)
- Solutions (2019)
- Inside Voices / Outside Voices (2022)
- Mono (2023)

=== With 2XT ===
- Special Feelings (2026)

== Awards and nominations ==
Year	Award	Work	Category	Result
2018	Grammy Awards	Every Where Is Some Where	Best Engineered Album, Non-Classical	Nominated
2018	Grammy Awards	"Blood in the Cut"	Best Rock Song	Nominated

== See also ==
- Lauren Sanderson
