= Control (Mutemath song) =

Single by Mutemath

from the album Mutemath
- Released: January 15, 2008 (radio)
- Recorded: Nashville, Tennessee
- Genre: Rock
- Length: 4:38
- Label: Teleprompt/WBR
- Songwriters: Paul Meany; Darren King; Adam LaClave
- Producers: Tedd T Mutemath

Mutemath singles chronology
"Flesh and Bones Electric Fun" (2007)	"Control" (2008)	"Spotlight" (2009)

"Control" is a song written by rock band Mutemath. It's the second radio single from their self-titled debut album. The single was released to radio in January 2008. A digital single followed in February 2008. The song was written by Paul Meany, Darren King, Roy Mitchell-Cárdenas and Greg Hill. It was originally released on Reset EP in 2004. The song is also featured as downloadable content for the Rock Band series of video games. The song won a Dove Award in 2005 for Best Modern Rock Song of the Year.

== Music video ==
The Craigslist ad for extras stated that it is a "highly stylized concept" that requires at least 300 extras. As of 2021, the music video has not been released yet due to copyright issues in regards to a similar, previously released clip from a European group. However, the music video was included on the DVD of the fall Armistice tour, filmed at Gurgaon, Haryana, India. A leaked version of the clip can be found here.

== Awards ==
The song won a 2005 GMA Dove Award for Modern Rock Recorded Song of the Year.
