= Roy Mitchell-Cárdenas =

American musician (born 1977)

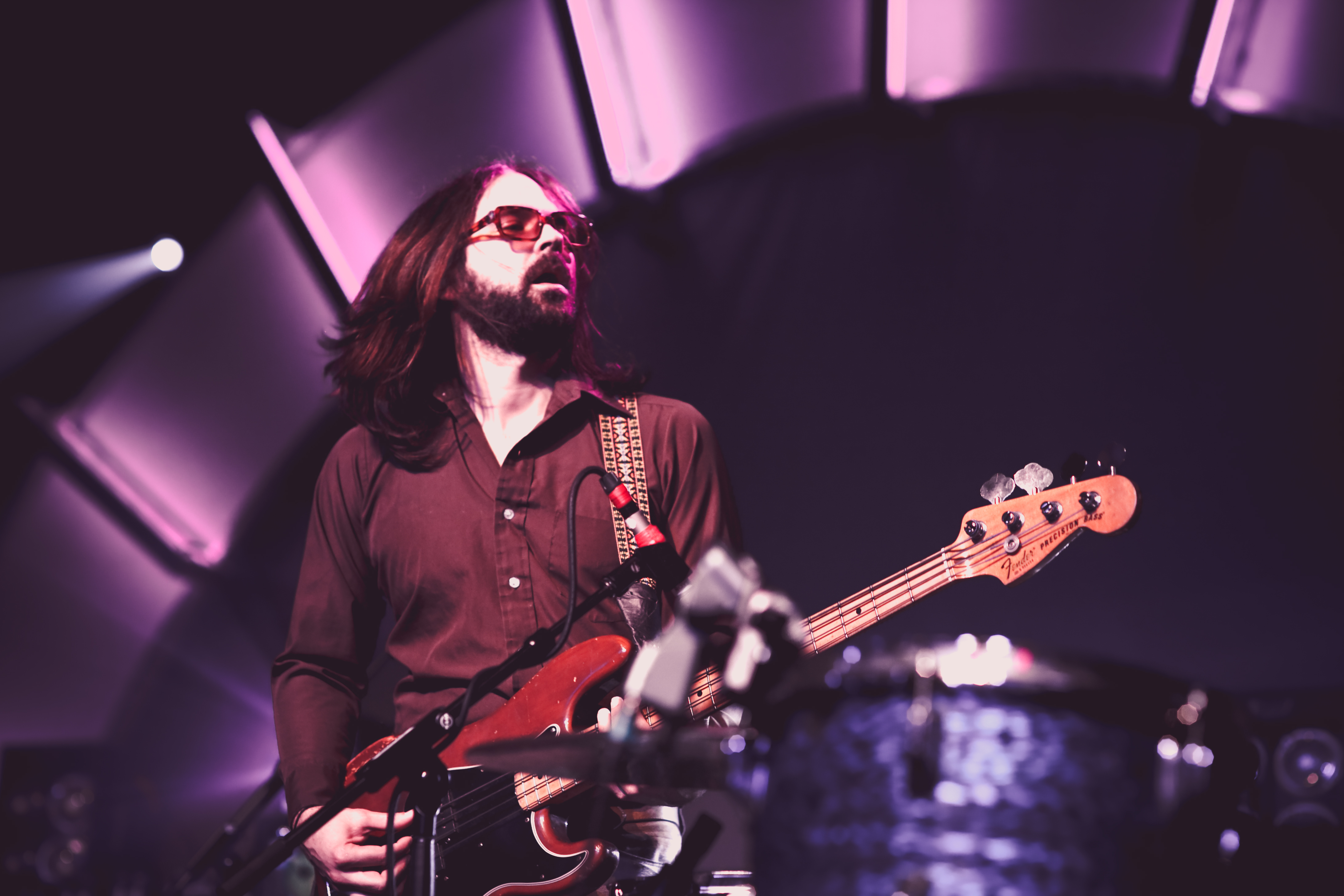
- Mitchell-Cárdenas performing in 2009

Background information
- Born: July 25, 1977 (age 49)
- Origin: McAllen, Texas, US
- Genres: Electronica; indie; pop; rock; ambient; jazz
- Occupations: Musician; producer
- Instruments: Bass; double bass; guitar; sampler; drums; synth bass; keyboards; percussion; vocals
- Years active: 1989–present
- Labels: Teleprompt; Warner
- Formerly of: Mutemath; Earthsuit; The Pink Dust
- Website: roymitchellcardenas.com

Roy Mitchell-Cárdenas (born July 25, 1977) is an American multi-instrumentalist and producer. He has been the bassist (as well as playing other instruments) for the rock bands Mutemath, Earthsuit, and the Pink Dust. In addition to bass, he plays upright bass, guitar, drums, and keyboards, and he sings.

== Discography ==
=== with Earthsuit ===
- Noise for Your Eyes (1999) – electric and acoustic bass
- Kaleidoscope Superior (2000) – electric bass, sample/programming

=== with Mutemath ===
- Mutemath (2006) – electric and acoustic bass
- Armistice (2009) – electric and acoustic bass, guitar on "Spotlight"
- Armistice Live (2010)
- Odd Soul (2011) – electric bass, electric guitar, acoustic guitar, percussion
- Vitals (2015) - electric guitar, electric bass, synthesizers
- Play Dead (2017) – electric bass and electric guitar

=== with the Pink Dust ===
- The Pink Dust (2015)

=== Other ===
- Marco Barrientos – Sin Reservas (2000) – bass
- Meshach Jackson – Experiments in Drowing (2005) – composition, production
- Roger Petersen – Blur (2007) – bass
- Slow Hands – Dependence (2008) – bass on "Cocoon"
- Plastic Planets – Plastic Planets (2013) – vocals
- Manic After Midnite – "Faces (Can You Tell Me)" (2014) – bass
