= Armistice (album) =

Studio album by Mutemath
- Released: August 5, 2009
- Recorded: New Orleans, Louisiana
- Genres: Alternative rock, post-rock
- Length: 48:58
- Labels: Teleprompt Records; Warner Bros. Records; Warner Music Japan; Megaphon Germany
- Producers: Mutemath, Dennis Herring

Mutemath chronology
Spotlight EP (2009)	Armistice (2009)	Armistice Live (2010)

Singles from Armistice
- 1. "Spotlight" Released: February 10, 2009; 2. "The Nerve" Released: June 2009; 3. "Backfire" Released: September 2009

Professional ratings
Aggregate scores
Source	Rating
Metacritic	70/100
Review scores
Source	Rating
AllMusic	3/5 stars
Alternative Press	8/10 stars
Paste	4.6/10
PopMatters	7/10 stars

Armistice is the second studio album by Mutemath, released in Japan on August 5, 2009 and in the US on August 18.

== Recording ==
During the recording of the album, short videos have been posted to the band's YouTube profile. These videos document the work going on in the studio, including street interviews where New Orleans locals are shown samples of the album (which cannot be heard in the video), recording their reactions. Any clips of actual music from the new album are presented in such a way that they only hint at what the album will eventually sound like.

== History ==
On April 4, 2008, Goodwin Films announced they were working on a documentary film about the making of Mutemath's new record. No further details have been announced regarding the release of the film.

On August 2, 2008, in an interview with The Morning Call, band member Paul Meany spoke about the new record. "We want to keep it in the oven and make sure things are ready to go," says Meany. "Anyone who thinks first album is perfect will hate this [new] record. If you heard the first record and liked some stuff about it [but] think things could improve, you may like it. It's important for us to change up the formula. We thought we were writing [the new album] for the last 2½ years on the road, but found out we weren't. We just started three months ago."

On January 14, 2009, Darren King said in an interview that after a break for the holidays, they would "get back to recording in hopes of having everything done in March so that the album can come out in August. It has taken way longer than we would have ever imagined but we’re just not done with it yet." Additionally, he mentioned that the album was Mutemath's first album which involved collaboration among all four members of the band.

The title for the sophomore record was confirmed as Armistice on May 27, 2009 in an interview on InsideBayArea.com and then confirmed on the same day on the Mutemath forums Teleprompt Records and Warner Bros. Records made a joint press release on June 9, 2009 announcing the details of the album release including the name Armistice, album cover, and track listing, as well as the official US release date of August 18.

A special tour package of the Armistice album was released including a ticket to a Mutemath concert with "first-in-line" access, an invitation to an exclusive listening party held in advance of the album's release, a T-shirt, a lithograph, and a digital download of the Armistice album. The package also includes digital downloads of the single "The Nerve" as well as B-side recordings "Valium" and "Armistice (2nd Line version)" featuring Rebirth Brass Band.

== Commercial response ==
Armistice debuted at no. 18 on the Billboard 200, with over 18,000 units sold in the first week. The album also charted at no. 4 on Billboard Rock charts and no. 3 on the Billboard Digital Albums and Billboard Alternative Albums charts the same week.

== Track listing ==
All tracks are written by Paul Meany, Dennis Herring and Tedd Tjornhom.

No.	Title	Length
1.	"The Nerve"	2:57
2.	"Backfire"	3:21
3.	"Clipping"	4:05
4.	"Spotlight"	3:21
5.	"No Response"	4:01
6.	"Pins and Needles"	4:05
7.	"Goodbye"	4:09
8.	"Odds"	3:00
9.	"Electrify"	3:48
10.	"Armistice"	3:53
11.	"Lost Year"	3:13
12.	"Burden"	9:05
Total length:		48:58

United States iTunes bonus track
No.	Title	Length
13.	"Architecture"	4:22

VIP Tour Edition bonus tracks
No.	Title	Length
13.	"Valium"	4:27
14.	"Armistice" (2nd Line version, featuring Rebirth Brass Band)	3:37

Japan bonus track
No.	Title	Length
13.	"Clockwork"	4:44

== Release history ==
Region	Date
Japan	August 5, 2009
United States	August 18, 2009

== Personnel ==
- Paul Meany – vocals, keyboards, piano, keytar
- Darren King – drums, percussion
- Roy Mitchell-Cárdenas – bass, vocals
- Greg Hill – guitar, vocals
