= Odd Soul =

Studio album by Mutemath
- Released: October 4, 2011
- Recorded: New Orleans, LA; Los Angeles, CA
- Genre: Alternative rock; psychedelic soul
- Length: 50:18
- Label: Warner Bros. Records
- Producer: Mutemath

Mutemath chronology
Armistice Live (2010)	Odd Soul (2011)	Vitals (2015)

Singles from Odd Soul
- 1. "Odd Soul" Released: July 18, 2011; 2. "Blood Pressure" Released: August 8, 2011

Professional ratings
Aggregate scores
Source	Rating
Metacritic	80/100
Review scores
Source	Rating
AbsolutePunk.net	9.5/10
AllMusic	3.5/5 stars
Christianity Today	4.0/5 stars
Popmatters	3.0/5 stars

Odd Soul is the third full-length release from New Orleans group Mutemath. The album was released by Teleprompt Records and Warner Bros. Records on October 4, 2011. It is the first album without original guitarist Greg Hill. Bassist Roy Mitchell Cardenas filled in on guitar duties during writing and recording. The album was recorded at Paul Meany's house in New Orleans with no involvement by record company executives. In various interviews band members stated that the process of creating the album was very collaborative with all members playing guitar.

== Tour ==
Prior to the album's release, the band embarked on the "Odd Soul Introduction Tour", going back to smaller intimate club settings, rather than the mid-level theaters featured throughout the Armistice tour. The band played Odd Soul album in its entirety, as well as some tracks from previous albums. Their stage show included the usage of 3D projections.

== Reception ==
Odd Soul received generally positive reviews upon its release. At Metacritic, which assigns a normalized rating out of 100 to reviews from mainstream critics, the album received an average score of 80, based on 5 reviews, with many reviewers praising the band's new blues-influenced sound. It debuted at number 24 on the US Billboard 200, and at number 70 in Canada.

The album debuted at No. 24 on the Billboard 200 albums chart on its first week of release, selling around 13,000 copies in the United States in its first week. It also debuted at No. 8 on Billboard's Rock Albums chart. and No. 7 on the Alternative Albums chart. As of October 2015, the album has sold 54,000 copies in the US.

== Track listing ==
All songs written and composed by Mutemath

No.	Title	Length
1.	"Odd Soul"	3:15
2.	"Prytania"	4:13
3.	"Blood Pressure"	3:04
4.	"Tell Your Heart Heads Up"	2:53
5.	"All or Nothing"	4:50
6.	"Sun Ray"	1:52
7.	"Allies"	3:14
8.	"Cavalries"	3:28
9.	"Walking Paranoia"	3:05
10.	"One More"	5:00
11.	"Equals"	3:29
12.	"Quarantine"	7:02
13.	"In No Time"	4:53

Deluxe Edition Bonus Tracks
No.	Title	Length
14.	"Amendment"	2:38
15.	"Cold Sparks"	3:42
16.	"Sun Ray, Pt. 2"	2:54

== Personnel ==
- Paul Meany – vocals, keyboards, guitar
- Darren King – drums, guitar
- Roy Mitchell-Cárdenas – bass, guitars
