= Adam LaClave =

American musician and singer

- Also known as: Chuckfamous
- Origin: New Orleans, Louisiana, United States
- Genres: Odd soul, glam
- Years active: 1998–present

Adam LaClave is an American musician and singer. He was one of the vocalists and songwriters for the Christian band Earthsuit. The group's only major-label album, Kaleidoscope Superior, was critically successful. However, the band broke up soon afterward. LaClave formed a new band called Macrosick, along with bassist Jon Allen, with former Earthsuit Members Paul Meany, Darren King, and Mutemath guitarist Greg Hill helping to give it a start. But the band went on hiatus in 2005 due to Hurricane Katrina. Recently, LaClave has formed a new group with Allen called Club of the Sons. They have opened for Paul Meany's group, Mutemath on occasion. He is currently working on solo material under the alias Charlie Blacksmoke.

LaClave's baritone vocals have been compared to that of David Bowie, as well as David Byrne of Talking Heads, and he is also known for his vibrato. LaClave rarely shows his eyes while on stage. While performing with Earthsuit and Macrosick, he wore large sunglasses. Currently, he lets his fringe cover his eyes during concerts with Club of the Sons.

Adam LaClave has also co-written several Mutemath songs such as "Control," "Electrify," "Prytania," and the title track of their 2011 album Odd Soul.
