= Play Dead (Mutemath album) =

Studio album by Mutemath
- Released: September 8, 2017
- Genres: Alternative rock, indie rock, Christian rock
- Length: 51:41
- Label: Wojtek
- Producer: Mutemath

Mutemath chronology
| Vitals (2015) | Play Dead (2017) |

Singles from Play Dead
- 1. "Hit Parade" Released: June 6, 2017; 2. "Stroll On" Released: July 13, 2017

Play Dead is the fifth studio album by New Orleans group Mutemath. The album was released on September 8, 2017. It is the last studio album featuring Darren King who departed the band on August 8, 2017 and Roy Mitchell-Cárdenas who left on May 3, 2017. and the final studio album to feature Mutemath as a band before transitioning into a solo project in 2018.

== Release ==
The album was released on September 8, 2017.

Professional ratings
Review scores
| Source | Rating |
|---|---|
| CCM Magazine | 5/5 stars |

Play Dead debuted at No. 112 on the Billboard 200 albums chart on its first week of release, selling around 13,000 copies in the United States in its first week. It also debuted at No. 20 on Billboard's Rock Albums chart. and No. 7 on the Alternative Albums chart.

== Tour ==
Prior to the album's release, the band embarked on the "Play Dead" Tour in Europe. Following the release of the album, Mutemath started touring the United States. This was the first tour for both Jonathan Allen and David "Hutch" Hutchison as they joined the band following the departures of both Roy Mitchell-Cárdenas and Darren King, although Roy announced he will still be contributing. The opening acts consisted of Colony House and Romes.

== Track listing ==
| No. | Title | Length |
|---|---|---|
| 1. | "Hit Parade" | 5:15 |
| 2. | "Pixie Oaks" | 4:29 |
| 3. | "Stroll On" | 3:57 |
| 4. | "Break the Fever" | 5:33 |
| 5. | "Nuisance" | 3:22 |
| 6. | "Placed on Hold" | 5:23 |
| 7. | "Everything's New" | 6:05 |
| 8. | "War" | 4:50 |
| 9. | "Achilles Heel" | 6:38 |
| 10. | "Marching to the End" | 6:09 |
| Total length: | | 51:41 |

== Personnel ==
- Paul Meany – vocals, keyboards, piano, guitar
- Darren King – drums, percussion
- Roy Mitchell-Cárdenas – guitar, bass, keyboards, vocals
- Todd Gummerman – guitar, keyboards, synthesizer, tambourine, vocals
