= Macrosick =

American indie art rock band

- Origin: New Orleans, Louisiana
- Genres: New wave, indie rock, electronica
- Years active: 2003–present
- Label: Spacefarm
- Spinoff of: Earthsuit
- Members: Adam LaClave; Jonathan Allen; Jonathan Odom
- Past members: Paul Meany; Darren King
- Website: www.spacefarmrecords.com

Macrosick is an American independent art rock band based in New Orleans, Louisiana.

Macrosick was formed in 2003 by Adam LaClave and is influenced by acts such as like Devo and Talking Heads. The group consists of LaClave as frontman, and a somewhat-evolving group of musicians including guitarist Dan Brigham, bassist Jonathan Allen, drummer Gavin McDonald and visual artist Jonathan Odom. Former or temporary members include guitarists Christopher Evans and Greg Hill of Mutemath and Adam's former Earthsuit bandmates Paul Meany on keys, and Darren King on drums, (both of Mutemath) guitarist Dave Rumsey and drummer David "Hutch" Hutchison.

== Origin ==
Macrosick is one of two bands formed after the split of Earthsuit, a band in the Christian scene who fused rock music with elements of hip-hop, jazz, reggae, and electronic experimentation. The two singers of Earthsuit formed their own bands after the group's break-up. Mutemath was formed by Paul Meany, and Macrosick was formed by Adam LaClave. Both bands, like Earthsuit, mix rock with electronic elements but they both go about this in different ways.

== Hiatus ==
When Hurricane Katrina devastated the New Orleans area, most of Macrosick's members were forced to scatter to various locations in the United States, effectively putting the band on hiatus. Adam LaClave and Jonathan Allen now perform together as Club of the Sons.

== Discography ==
- demodisk (2003) - Independent
1. Under These Skies (3:25)
2. Beautiful World (3:20)
3. Cash Machine (4:11)
4. We Never Started (3:31)
5. Nothing's On The Radio (3:18)
6. Nice Hush (3:14)
7. Jerkweed Inspector (3:15)
- We Never Started EP iTunes Digital Release (2008) - Spacefarm Records
1. Jerkweed Inspector (3:15)
2. We Never Started (3:31)
3. Hush (3:14)
4. Cash Machine (4:11)

=== Other songs ===
- "Prize" (an MP3 e-mailed to the people who ordered the demo EP)
- "Pins and Needles" (live)
- "Last Ones Out" (live)
- "We Are the Scene Consensus" (live)
- "Acting" (live)
- "God Side" (live)
- "Decomposer" (live; instrumental)
- "Firehands" (live; instrumental)
- "D Minor" (live; instrumental)
- "Triggers While You Sleep" (now a Club of the Sons song)
- "Streetwork" (now a Club of the Sons song)
- "People Are Just" (now a Club of the Sons song)

=== Known covers ===
- "Fame" - David Bowie (live)
- "Neon Lights" - Kraftwerk (live)
- "Beat It" - Michael Jackson (live, partial)
- "Beautiful World" - Devo (demo EP)
