= Typical (song) =

Single by Mutemath

from the album Mutemath
- B-side: "Progress"
- Released: April 10, 2007
- Recorded: Nashville, Tennessee
- Genre: Alternative rock
- Length: 4:12
- Label: Teleprompt, Warner Bros.
- Songwriters: Paul Meany; Darren King
- Producers: Tedd T Mutemath

Mutemath singles chronology
"Peculiar People" (2005)	"Typical" (2007)	"Transformers Theme" (2007)

"Typical" is the lead single from American rock group Mutemath's self titled album. The song was written in 2003 by Paul Meany and Darren King. The digital single was released on April 10, 2007. A physical single was released in the UK only on August 27, 2007. Josh Harris club remixes of the song were also released digitally to several outlets on September 18, 2007. The song is featured as downloadable content for the Rock Band series of video games, was part of the soundtrack for the 2006 video game ATV Offroad Fury 4, and was featured in the 2009 film The Stepfather.

== Television and radio ==
The group has performed the song on both ABC's Jimmy Kimmel Live! and CBS' The Late Late Show with Craig Ferguson, and the video began rotation on MTV Networks in May 2007, beginning with MTVu. An edited form of the song was featured on an advertisement for the Discovery Channel in the spring of 2008. It was also used in a promo for HBO in 2007.

As of late June 2007, the single started receiving major airplay on modern-rock stations and rose quickly up the Mediabase alternative chart, jumping from #115 to #65, and was also the second-most-added song on alternative stations the week of June 13, 2007. The single then jumped to a peak position of #36 the first week of August 2007, remaining there for over 6 weeks and debuted at #39 on Billboard's US Modern Rock Chart the week of August 4, 2007 where it reached a peak position of #33.

== Music video ==
The video for "Typical" premiered on YouTube on March 21, 2007. The concept video was directed by Israel Anthem and features the band performing the song backwards. Similar to Chris Martin's preparation for the music video for Coldplay's "The Scientist", the band rehearsed and memorized the performance in reverse. In total, the original video has been viewed more than 4 million times. The video reached #7 on Billboard's Hot Video Clip Tracks chart in July 2007. The group garnered further buzz for the single by recreating their video in a live performance for Jimmy Kimmel Live! using the same technique that was used in the original video. The video was nominated for a Grammy Award on December 6, 2007, for "Best Short Form Video".

== Track listing ==
Original Single Release

1. "Typical" (album version) - 4:12

Promo Remix CD (PRO-CD-102127)

1. "Typical" (Josh Harris club mix) - 7:41
2. "Typical" (Josh Harris club dub) - 7:31
3. "Typical" (Josh Harris remix edit) - 3:48

UK Single CD (B000UDY8KK)

1. "Typical" (album version) - 4:12
2. "Progress" - 4:45
3. "Typical" (Enhanced CD Video)
4. "Typical" (Enhanced CD Live Video) (This video recording is from the Live at the El Rey EP.)

== Release history ==
Region	Date
United States	April 10, 2007
United Kingdom	August 27, 2007
