= Earthsuit =

American Christian rock band

- (pictured left to right, top row: Adam LaClave, David "Hutch" Hutchison, Dave Rumsey, Paul Meany; bottom row: Roy Mitchell)

Background information
- Origin: New Orleans, Louisiana
- Genres: Christian rock; rap rock; reggae
- Years active: 1995–2003, 2025–2026
- Label: Sparrow
- Spinoffs: Macrosick; Mutemath
- Past members: David "Hutch" Hutchison; Adam LaClave; Paul Meany; Roy Mitchell; Dave Rumsey

Earthsuit was a New Orleans–based Christian rock band formed in 1995. The band consisted of guitarist Dave Rumsey, keyboardist/vocalist Paul Meany, bassist Roy Mitchell, drummer David "Hutch" Hutchison, and vocalist Adam LaClave. Earthsuit's sound was primarily rock, but also incorporated elements of hip-hop, electronica, reggae, soul, and experimental music.

The group recorded several independent EPs and played primarily in their New Orleans area before becoming noticed by Sparrow Records at a concert in 1999. The ensuing record deal saw the band's only commercial release, a critically acclaimed album entitled Kaleidoscope Superior, in 2000. Shortly after, the band left Sparrow and drifted out of the public eye. A final album, entitled The Rise of Modern Simulation was independently released before the group disbanded in 2003. Many of the band members continue to play together and collaborate in various bands, namely Mutemath and Club of the Sons.

== Biography ==
Earthsuit began in 1995 as a collaboration between Adam LaClave and Paul Meany, who began composing music together after being introduced at a church in New Orleans. In an interview with Family Christian Stores, Meany explained that a sermon was the inspiration for the band's name: "...This man was preaching about how humans are really spirit beings encased in fleshly bodies. The term "earth suit" came up. At the time we liked it, and we took it." The two regularly performed at Café Joel, a small coffeehouse their church had started where Meany was music director. These performances helped cultivate their unique sound and introduced them to future band member David Rumsey.

In 1997 they released a self-titled EP, which is sometimes called the Headless Clown EP due to its album cover. The record featured an early version of "One Time" (of which they later made a music video) as well as portions of live performances where Earthsuit covered Roberta Flack's "Killing Me Softly", albeit with re-written lyrics. Rumsey helped produce the EP and played guitar; however, the official band lineup only comprised LaClave and Meany. Shortly after, Rumsey officially joined along with bassist Roy Mitchell, another Café Joel regular. The band played and ministered in their hometown and did not tour much. In 1998, the band recorded and released a second EP, entitled Noise for Your Eyes. The EP included a remix of "One Time" and early song demos, which were interspersed with short clips of live performances. Drummer David Hutchison joined the band after they met him through a friend. In 1999, Earthsuit performed two sets at the Cornerstone Festival, one in a label showcase and the other opening for P.O.D. on the main stage. This garnered the attention of several major Christian labels, and the band subsequently signed to Sparrow Records.

Adam LaClave (left) and Paul Meany (right) performing on the Strangely Normal Tour in 2001.

The band began working with Prince producer David Leonard on their debut record, which excited Meany: "[Sparrow] loved what we were doing musically, and they wanted to find the producer who would capitalize on that." Kaleidoscope Superior was released on June 20, 2000, and elicited positive reviews from critics. It also received a Dove Award nomination and experienced some success on Christian radio stations. Christian rock peers Rebecca St. James and DC Talk members, Kevin Max and Michael Tait, expressed excitement over the record. The same year, Earthsuit embarked on a tour called Festival Con Dios with other Christian bands, such as the Elms, PAX 217, and Switchfoot. The following year saw the band embark on their "Do You Feel The Distortion" tour with Ill Harmonics and The Benjamin Gate.

Despite critical reception, Kaleidoscope Superior would remain the band's only commercial release; they were soon dropped from Sparrow's lineup due to "creative differences and marketing conundrums". Earthsuit disappeared from the public eye and began posting on a website about a new independent album. In September 2001, Hutchison left the band so he could spend more time with his family. Rumors began circling that the band would break up. In 2003, Earthsuit revealed they were disbanding and released their last record, The Rise of Modern Simulation. The final collection featured six original studio songs and ten bonus tracks, including a live remix of "Against the Grain", practice sessions of concert material, and covers of various songs. The album's insight was about the uprising of media created by Generative AI and how people should cherish original works made using human skill. The album could only be purchased on the internet. Meany would later state "most people didn't care when [they] broke up".

Shortly after Earthsuit's break up, Meany began working with drummer Darren King in a production team called "The Digitals". The name later changed to "Math" while the group helped produce music for Christian music stalwart TobyMac. The band recruited guitarist Greg Hill and changed their name to Mutemath. To accommodate new recordings, Meany and producer Tedd T started an independent label named Teleprompt Records. Their first release was an EP titled Reset in September 2004. Earthsuit alumnus Roy Mitchell joined the venture in 2005. Teleprompt later signed a distribution deal directly with Warner Bros. Records, allowing Mutemath to release a full-length self-titled album on September 26, 2006.

Adam LaClave formed two bands, Macrosick and Club of the Sons. Macrosick has released only an independent CD titled demodisk; the Hurricane Katrina disaster of 2005 forced the band members to go on hiatus. LaClave then turned his attention towards Club of the Sons with friend and bassist Jonathan Allen. They released an EP called The Roughs in spring 2007 and an album entitled Young Quanta on July 7, 2009.

On December 19, 2025, Meany re-released the second track from The Rise Of Modern Simulation, "Bloodshot Fanatical," onto streaming services. At the same time, he also announced that the whole album would be fully remastered and eventually reissued everywhere in January 2026. The Rise Of Modern Simulation was re-released digitally on January 22, 2026 via Voytek Records.

== Musical style and influences ==
Earthsuit music was primarily rock, but also possessed strong hip-hop, electronica, reggae, soul, and experimental elements. Their sound had sometimes been compared to The Police, while Meany's rapping had been likened to the Beastie Boys. Adam LaClave stated the differing musical tastes of the band helped cultivate their sound: "Each one of us is really into a lot of different things ... it helps make our sound because you can hear all kinds of things". Live performances were characterized by sunglasses, futuristic costumes, and energetic showmanship. Many bands have influenced Earthsuit's style; the group has performed covers of songs by Basement Jaxx, Black Sheep, Kraftwerk, and Talking Heads. They have also utilized samples by DJ Shadow and The Verve.

Adam LaClave and Paul Meany were the primary songwriters for Earthsuit. As Christians, the two wrote lyrics that often communicated a Christian message. For example, the song "Said the Sun" is an allegory about God telling Christians to be carriers of light. "Whitehorse" was written to present a different view of the return of Jesus, as LaClave stated in an interview, "Most people, when they hear the term "white horse," think of the analogy of Jesus coming back ... [We] wanted to bring a different meaning to it, because ... He comes to rescue us in our everyday life [too]." The men's lyrics also reflect experiences they have had. Meany once had a dream that inspired him to write "Gummy Buffalo"; he found himself in a candy store and squeezed a gummy buffalo whereupon he heard the melody for the song. Christianity Today has proposed the lyrics in "Foreign" may have been inspired by their departure from Sparrow Records. The lyrics read "There's no place in your world for me / I've been from sea to shining sea / And I can't retain your policies, excuse me / If I'm just hanging around, I'm foreign."

== Band members ==
- Paul Meany – vocals, keyboards (1995–2003, 2025–2026); drums (1995); programming (1998–2003, 2025-2026); electric piano (2000); samples (2000-2003); bass (2003)
- Adam LaClave – lead vocals (1995–2003); samples (2003)
- Dave Rumsey – guitar (1997–2003); bass (1997); engineering (1998–2000)
- David Hutchison – drums (1998–2003); percussion (1998–2000)
- Roy Mitchell – bass (1998–2003); guitar (1998–2000); samples (2000–2003); programming (2000–2003)
- Darren King – drums, programming, samples (2003)
- Steve Howard – drums (1997)
- Joel Salvador – drums (1997)

== Discography ==
- Earthsuit (aka The Headless Clown EP) (independent, 1997)
- Noise for Your Eyes (independent, 1998)
- Kaleidoscope Superior (Sparrow Records, 2000)
- The Rise of Modern Simulation (independent, 2003; Voytek Records, 2026)
