= So Far So Fake =

2023 song by Pierce the Veil

Single by Pierce the Veil

from the album The Jaws of Life
- Released: February 10, 2023
- Recorded: 2021
- Genre: Pop-punk
- Length: 3:56
- Label: Fearless
- Songwriters: Vic Fuentes; Jaime Preciado; Paul Meany; Curtis Peoples; Steve Solomon
- Producer: Paul Meany

"So Far So Fake" is a song by American rock band Pierce the Veil from their fifth studio album The Jaws of Life (2023). It was a sleeper hit, gaining widespread attention on the video-sharing app TikTok in 2025, following which it became their first song to enter the Billboard Hot 100, peaking at number 64. It also became their second number 1 hit on Billboard 's Alternative Airplay chart (after "Emergency Contact" in 2023).

== Background ==
The song was written in 2017. In regard to the message, Vic Fuentes said:

It's about if you've ever been betrayed by somebody you felt was a friend, and the wound never really mended—where even an apology doesn't feel like it's enough. It feels like it can never really be resolved. So, it's a bit angry, a bit sour, a bit difficult to think about. But I always want to write about things that are affecting my life.

== Promotion ==
The song had been used on TikTok since its release in 2023, but resurged in popularity after one particular TikTok video that was posted on July 11, 2025, and showed the user whining her waist to the instrumental break of the song. According to Luminate, "So Far So Fake" gathered over 185,000 official on-demand U.S. streams in the four-day period following the post (July 11–14) and over 1.18 million streams by the next week (July 18–21).

== Charts ==
=== Weekly charts ===
Weekly chart performance for "So Far So Fake"
Chart (2025)	Peak position
Australia (ARIA)	69
Canada Hot 100 (Billboard)	70
Canada Mainstream Rock (Billboard Canada)	39
Global 200 (Billboard)	111
Ireland (IRMA)	91
UK Singles (Official Charts)	46
UK Rock & Metal (Official Charts)	2
US Billboard Hot 100	64
US Hot Rock & Alternative Songs (Billboard)	8
US Alternative Airplay (Billboard)	1

=== Year-end charts ===
Year-end chart performance for "So Far So Fake"
Chart (2025)	Position
US Hot Rock & Alternative Songs (Billboard)	41

== Certifications ==
Region	Certification	Certified units/sales
Australia (ARIA)	Gold	35,000^{‡}
New Zealand (RMNZ)	Gold	15,000^{‡}
United States (RIAA)	Gold	500,000^{‡}
^{‡} Sales+streaming figures based on certification alone.
