= Armistice Live =

Live album by Mutemath
- Released: October 12, 2010
- Recorded: November 6, 2009; Atlanta; Tabernacle
- Genres: Alternative rock, electronic rock
- Length: 69:58 (Audio CD)
- Labels: Teleprompt Records; Warner Bros. Records
- Producer: Mutemath

Mutemath chronology
Armistice (2009)	Armistice Live (2010)	Odd Soul (2011)

Armistice Live is a live concert film and album release from New Orleans electronic rock group Mutemath. The video was released by Teleprompt Records and Warner Bros. Records on October 12, 2010. The DVD features Mutemath's performance from the Tabernacle in Atlanta that was filmed on their Armistice Tour in the Fall of 2009. In addition to the DVD release, a high-definition recording of the concert can be purchased on iTunes.

== Reception ==
The Allmusic review by Andrew Leahey awarded the album 3.5 stars stating "Recorded in late 2009 at an Atlanta concert hall, this album is essentially a showcase for Mutemath’s second album, which traded the epic pop/rock of the band’s self-titled debut for a more angular, experimental sound. Most of the material comes from that record, with several older songs (most notably “Typical,” the band’s biggest hit) tossed it for good measure. Armistice was a meticulously produced album, filled with all sorts of studio flourishes and late-night ambience, but the material translates surprisingly well to a live setting, where the studio reverb is replaced by the natural acoustics of Atlanta’s Tabernacle venue... The actual music is the highlight here, though, since a textured record like Armistice isn’t the easiest thing to re-create on-stage. As a result, Armistice Live isn’t your typical fans-only concert album; it’s a testament to Mutemath’s strength as a band, and arguably their most interesting release to date."

Professional ratings
Review scores
Source	Rating
Allmusic	3.5/5 stars

== DVD track listing ==
1. "The Nerve"
2. "Backfire"
3. "Clipping"
4. "Control"
5. "Armistice"
6. "You Are Mine"
7. "Odds"
8. "Typical"
9. "Burden"
10. "Pins And Needles"
11. "Spotlight"
12. "Reset"
13. "Break The Same"

Bonus Features:
- In The Studio (Making Armistice documentary)
- "Electrify", "Goodbye", and "Spotlight" Live In Japan
- "Spotlight", "Backfire", "Typical", and "Control" music videos
- The making of the "Control" and "Spotlight" music videos
- Studio Vlogs

== CD track listing ==
1. "The Nerve" - 4:04
2. "Backfire" - 3:46
3. "Clipping" - 4:49
4. "Control" - 5:50
5. "Armistice" - 5:36
6. "You Are Mine" - 3:48
7. "Odds" - 3:31
8. "Typical" - 4:12
9. "Burden" - 10:35
10. "Pins And Needles" - 3:19
11. "Spotlight" - 5:51
12. "Reset" - 5:38
13. "Break The Same" - 8:59

== Official pre-order exclusive tracks ==
1. "Electrify (Live In Japan)"
2. "Goodbye (Live In Japan)"

Additionally, two new tracks entitled "Another Goodbye (Goodbye Acoustic)" and the instrumental track "Forte" were delivered digitally to groups of 15 people or more that registered to attend a 'listening party' for the new CD. As of 2021, these tracks still haven't received an official public release.

== Personnel ==
- Nathan Allworth, Andrew Catellier, Alex Mo, Fred Morledge, Jay Oldaker, Maria Petersen, Max Roper, Carrie Vorpahl – Photography
- Israel Anthem – Director
- Nate Black – Assistant, Filmmaker
- Steve Chant – Engineer
- Nate Dreger – Video Technician
- Brandon Goodwin – Director, Editing, Filmmaker
- Pete Healey – Monitors, Production Manager
- Chris Johnston – Mixing
- Darren King – Editing
- Kevin Kookogey – Management
- Darien Koop – Lighting Director
- Nate Lampa – Stage Technician
- Jeff Lava – Lighting Design
- Brook Linder – Assistant
- Drue Madrid – Associate Producer
- Paul Meany – Mixing
- Nick Modica – Stage Technician
- Dustin Robicheaux – Editing
- Atom Rothlein – Director, Editing
- Devin Sarno – Executive Producer
- Alex Tenta – Design, Layout
