= Mutemath (album) =

Studio album by Mutemath
- Released: January 19, 2006
- Recorded: 2005
- Venue: Nashville, Tennessee
- Genres: Alternative rock, post-rock
- Length: 57:23
- Labels: Teleprompt, Warner Bros.
- Producers: Mutemath, Tedd T

Mutemath chronology
Reset EP (2004)	Mutemath (2006)	Live at the El Rey (2006)

Singles from Mutemath
- 1. "Typical" Released: April 10, 2007; 2. "Control" Released: January 15, 2008

Professional ratings
Review scores
Source	Rating
AbsolutePunk.net	(89%)
Allmusic	3.5/5 stars
Jesus Freak Hideout	4/5 stars
Melodic.net	5/5 stars
Spin	4 /5 stars
Thatdoesntsoundright	Positive

Mutemath is the first full-length album by Mutemath, independently released by Teleprompt (formed in 2004 with production/management partners Tedd Tjornhom and Kevin Kookogey). The album was initially packaged in a jewel case and was sold exclusively at concert dates on their 2006 album tour. The release date was January 19, the first date of the tour.

Near the beginning of February 2006, the album was added to the Teleprompt Records online store, and was from then on sold in digipak form, both online and at concerts. According to Mutemath's management, Mutemath sold nearly 10,000 copies in the first month of its release, selling almost 100 copies per day via their website.

The album was also released as a two-disc vinyl record in May 2006.

On September 26, 2006, the album was re-released on Warner Bros. Records, featuring additional tracks from Reset. A limited-edition live EP was included with the first 25,000 copies. The album debuted on Billboard's Top Heatseekers Chart at No. 17. It reappeared on the same chart almost a year later at No. 28 on August 4, 2007, while the first radio single "Typical" debuted at No. 39 on Billboard's US Modern Rock Chart the same week. The album has sold over 100,000 copies since its original release.

The second single from Mutemath, "Control", was released to radio on January 15, 2008.

== Releases ==
=== Teleprompt version ===
(All songs written by Paul Meany except where noted)

1. "Collapse" – 1:12
2. "Typical" – 4:12
3. "After We Have Left Our Homes" – 1:14
4. "Chaos" (Mute Math, Adam LaClave) – 4:54
5. "Noticed" – 4:25
6. "Without It" (Mute Math, Adam LaClave) – 4:57
7. "Polite" – 1:22
8. "Stare at the Sun" – 4:33
9. "Obsolete" – 4:32
10. "Break the Same" – 7:22
11. "You Are Mine" (Mute Math, Dave Rumsey) – 6:08
12. "Picture" – 5:21
13. "Stall Out" – 7:05

=== Warner Bros. version ===
1. "Collapse" – 1:13
2. "Typical" – 4:12
3. "After We Have Left Our Homes" – 1:14
4. "Chaos" – 4:54
5. "Noticed" – 4:29
6. "Plan B" – 4:46
7. "Stare at the Sun" – 4:33
8. "Obsolete" – 4:30
9. "Break the Same" – 6:00
10. "You Are Mine" – 4:43
11. "Control" (Meany, King, LaClave) – 4:39
12. "Picture" – 5:26
13. "Stall Out" – 7:10
14. "Reset" – 5:25

=== Differences in the WBR re-release ===
The Warner Bros. version is mostly the same as the original version. There are, however, a few notable differences:

- "Without It"/"Polite" is replaced by a new version of "Plan B", featuring re-recorded guitars along with various small differences.
- "Obsolete" includes new vocals in the finale.
- "Break the Same" is shortened by approximately 1 minute and 22 seconds. The second chorus and most of the bridge section are cut out. The block of time removed begins after the second verse and before the second pre-chorus (1:42 in the original version), and ends in the middle of the bridge section (3:01 in the original version). The skip actually occurs in the middle of the phrase "And we all freaked out"; an attentive listener will be able to hear the jump.

The lyrics omitted from this version (which can be heard in the live recording) are:

The different stars tonight will somehow fade the same
And all the tears we cry tell us we're made the same
And when we fall aside, let's hope we fall in place
We build our different lives, but they all break the same
Break the same
We all do, we all break the same

The song also has an added guitar part in verse 2.

- "You Are Mine" is shortened by approximately 1 minute and 25 seconds. The reprise of the first verse is cut out, along with the chorus repetitions surrounding it. The block of time removed begins at the middle of the third chorus (3:39 in the original version) and ends at middle of the fourth chorus (5:00 in the original version).
- A new version of "Control" is inserted between "You Are Mine" and "Picture", featuring re-recorded bass and drums.
- "Picture" features a different vocal take of the first verse.
- "Reset" appears after "Stall Out", with minor audio changes.
- The compact disc face features revised artwork.

== Personnel ==
- Darren King – drums & samples
- Greg Hill – guitar
- Paul Meany – vocals, keyboards
- Roy Mitchell-Cárdenas – bass, upright bass

== Release history ==
Region	Date
United States	January 19, 2006
United States	September 26, 2006 (Re-release)
Canada	November 6, 2006
United Kingdom	August 27, 2007
Germany	July 16, 2007
Japan	January 16, 2008
