= The Jaws of Life (Pierce the Veil album) =

Studio album by Pierce the Veil
- Released: February 10, 2023
- Recorded: 2021
- Studios: Royal (New Orleans); Marigny (New Orleans)
- Genres: Alternative rock; post-grunge; pop-punk; emo-pop
- Length: 41:27
- Label: Fearless
- Producer: Paul Meany

Pierce the Veil chronology
Misadventures (2016)	The Jaws of Life (2023)

Singles from The Jaws of Life
- 1. "Pass the Nirvana" Released: September 1, 2022; 2. "Emergency Contact" Released: November 11, 2022; 3. "Even When I'm Not with You" Released: January 12, 2023; 4. "Kiss Me Now" Released: May 6, 2025

Professional ratings
Aggregate scores
Source	Rating
Metacritic	73/100
Review scores
Source	Rating
Kerrang!	4/5 stars

The Jaws of Life is the fifth studio album by American rock band Pierce the Veil, released on February 10, 2023. It is the band's first album not to feature drummer Mike Fuentes, with Brad Hargreaves of Third Eye Blind filling in. It is their first album to have a title track. The album received mostly positive reviews from critics.

The first single, "Pass the Nirvana", was released on September 1, 2022, marking the first piece of new material from the band since their 2016 album Misadventures. The album was announced on November 11, 2022, along with the release of a second single, "Emergency Contact". In 2025, the single "So Far So Fake" became a sleeper hit.

== Background and recording ==
In 2016, Pierce the Veil released their fourth album Misadventures, to critical acclaim. The band toured in support of the album from June 2016 until May 2017. In November 2017, two women came forward on Twitter detailing allegations of sexual misconduct against drummer Mike Fuentes, including statutory rape and solicitation of nude photos of a minor. Following these allegations, the band announced that Fuentes would be stepping back from the band indefinitely.

In April 2020, the band shared an at-home performance of their song "Hold On Till May" to their YouTube channel, featuring Mike Fuentes alongside the other members of the band. This led to some controversy on social media, as well as confusion as to whether Fuentes had been reinstated as a band member. Vocalist and guitarist Vic Fuentes later clarified that Mike Fuentes had not been part of the band since 2017, and that he would not be featured on their next album.

The band began working on The Jaws of Life as early as 2018, with Vic Fuentes teasing new material on social media. Fuentes spent a brief period living with MxPx vocalist and bassist Mike Herrera during the production of the album. Parts of the record, including single "Emergency Contact", were written in Herrera's home studio in Seattle. The record was produced by Mutemath frontman Paul Meany and mixed by Adam Hawkins.

== Composition ==
The album features collaborations with Brad Hargreaves of Third Eye Blind and Chloe Moriondo. The album has been said to have a more "melodic and intimate" sound than previous records, while also taking influence from grunge bands of the '90s. Isabella Le of Atwood described the Jaws of Life as pulling from "'90s nu-metal, grunge, and contemporary alt-pop."

On the album title, vocalist Vic Fuentes noted, "In short, it's just about how life can try and sink its teeth into you and devour you and trying to find your way out of that. I think this album represents getting out of that grip and seeing the light again and breaking through."

== Track listing ==
All lyrics are written by Vic Fuentes.

The Jaws of Life track listing
No.	Title	Music	Length
1.	"Death of an Executioner"	Vic Fuentes; Jaime Preciado; Paul Meany; Tony Perry; Colin Holbrook; Curtis Peoples	4:27
2.	"Pass the Nirvana"	Fuentes; Meany; Peoples; David Dahlquist; Pat Morrissey	3:17
3.	"Even When I'm Not with You"	Fuentes	2:54
4.	"Emergency Contact"	Fuentes; Peoples	4:00
5.	"Flawless Execution"	Fuentes; Meany	4:00
6.	"The Jaws of Life"	Fuentes; Peoples; Dahlquist; Morrissey	3:42
7.	"Damn the Man, Save the Empire"	Fuentes; Meany; Peoples; Mike Fuentes	3:57
8.	"Resilience"	Fuentes; Peoples; Colin Brittain	3:40
9.	"Irrational Fears (Interlude)"	Preciado	0:21
10.	"Shared Trauma"	Fuentes; Preciado	4:12
11.	"So Far So Fake"	Fuentes; Preciado; Meany; Peoples; Steve Solomon	3:56
12.	"12 Fractures" (featuring Chloe Moriondo)	Fuentes; Peoples	3:01
Total length:			41:27

Digital extended version
No.	Title	Music	Length
13.	"Pass the Nirvana" (live from When We Were Young '22)	Fuentes; Meany; Peoples; David Dahlquist; Pat Morrissey	3:58
Total length:			45:30

Deluxe edition
No.	Title	Music	Length
13.	"Kiss Me Now"	Fuentes; Perry; Preciado; Josh Rheault	4:17
14.	"Karma Police" (Radiohead cover)	Ed O’Brien; Colin Greenwood; Jonny Greenwood; Thom Yorke; Phillip Selway	4:29
Total length:			50:13

Note

- "Resilience" contains excerpts from the 1993 film Dazed and Confused.

== Personnel ==
Pierce the Veil

- Vic Fuentes – vocals, rhythm guitar (tracks 1–8, 10–12); percussion (1), music production (2), keyboards (3, 11)
- Tony Perry – lead guitar (1–8, 10–12)
- Jaime Preciado – bass (1–8, 11, 12), vocal engineering (all tracks), engineering (2), programming (9, 10), keyboards (9), music production (10), guitar (11)

Additional musicians

- Brad Hargreaves – drums (1–8, 10–12), percussion (10)
- Paul Meany – music production, keyboards (5, 11, 12), percussion (5)
- Leila Birch – spoken word (9)
- Chloe Moriondo – vocals (12)

Technical

- Paul Meany – executive production, recording production, engineering
- Ted Jensen – mastering
- Adam Hawkins – mixing
- David Garcia Marino – editing, engineering assistance
- Henry Lunetta – mixing assistance
- Steven Williamson – mixing assistance
- Adam Keil – engineering assistance
- Crispin Schroeder – engineering assistance
- Colin Holbrook – music production (1)
- David Dahlquist – music production (2)
- Pat Morrissey – music production (2)
- Steve Solomon – music production (11)
- Colin Brittain – engineering (8)
- Sannkaed – music production and engineering

Visuals

- Tension Division – art direction, design
- Natasha Wiseman – photography

== Charts ==
2023 chart performance for The Jaws of Life
Chart (2023)	Peak position
Australian Albums (ARIA)	8
Scottish Albums (Official Charts)	10
UK Albums (Official Charts)	43
UK Rock & Metal Albums (Official Charts)	2
US Billboard 200	14
US Independent Albums (Billboard)	2
US Top Alternative Albums (Billboard)	2
US Top Hard Rock Albums (Billboard)	1
US Top Rock Albums (Billboard)	3

2025 chart performance for The Jaws of Life
Chart (2025)	Peak position
French Rock & Metal Albums (SNEP)	55

== Release history ==
Release dates and formats for The Jaws of Life
Region	Date	Format	Label	Edition	Ref.
Various	February 10, 2023	CD; cassette; digital download; LP record; streaming	Fearless	Standard	
Various	March 10, 2023	Digital download; streaming	Fearless	Extended	
Various	May 9, 2025	Digital download; streaming	Fearless	Deluxe	
