= Pass the Nirvana =

Single by Pierce the Veil

from the album The Jaws of Life
- Released: September 1, 2022
- Recorded: 2021
- Genre: Grunge
- Length: 3:17
- Label: Fearless
- Songwriter: Vic Fuentes
- Producer: Paul Meany

Pierce the Veil singles chronology
"Today I Saw the Whole World" (2017)	"Pass the Nirvana" (2022)	"Emergency Contact" (2022)

"Pass the Nirvana" is a single by American rock band Pierce the Veil. Released on September 1, 2022, it was the first single by the band without drummer Mike Fuentes, and the first from their fifth studio album, The Jaws of Life.

== Release ==
The single was released on September 1, 2022, as the band's first new material since founding member, long-term drummer and frontman Vic Fuentes' brother, Mike Fuentes left the band amidst sexual misconduct allegations in 2017. It is the first single off the band's fifth studio album, The Jaws of Life, their first since 2016's Misadventures.

On April 7, 2023, 7-inch vinyl releases of the single were released through the band's website and Hot Topic. The website edition is turquoise blue, limited to 1,500 copies, while the Hot Topic edition is translucent orange, limited to 500 copies.

A recording of Pierce the Veil performing the song at the When We Were Young festival was included on the digital extended edition of The Jaws of Life.

== Reception ==
"Pass the Nirvana" was well received. Shannon Shumaker wrote in Prelude Press that she appreciated its turn towards a more grunge-esque songwriting, as opposed to the post-hardcore style seen on their previous albums.

== Personnel ==
Pierce the Veil

- Vic Fuentes – vocals, guitar, music production
- Tony Perry – guitar
- Jaime Preciado – bass guitar, engineering

Additional musicians

- Brad Hargreaves – drums

Technical

- Paul Meany – production, recording production, engineering
- Ted Jensen – mastering
- Adam Hawkins – mixing
- David Garcia Marino – editing, engineering assistance
- Henry Lunetta – mixing assistance
- Steven Williamson – mixing assistance
- Adam Keil – engineering assistance
- Crispin Schroeder – engineering assistance
- David Dahlquist – music production
- Pat Morrissey – music production

== Certifications ==
Certifications for "Pass the Nirvana"
Region	Certification	Certified units/sales
United States (RIAA)	Gold	500,000^{‡}
^{‡} Sales+streaming figures based on certification alone.

== Release history ==
Release dates and formats for "Pass the Nirvana"
Region	Date	Format	Recording	Label	Ref.
Various	September 1, 2022	Digital download; streaming	Original	Fearless	
Various	April 7, 2023	7-inch vinyl	Original	Fearless	
Various	September 16, 2023	7-inch vinyl	Live from When We Were Young 2022	Fearless	
Various	May 9, 2025 (Note: Though previously available as part of an extended version of The Jaws of Life since March 10, 2023, it was made available as a digital single on May 9, 2025.)	Digital download; streaming	Live from When We Were Young 2022	Fearless	
