= Emergency Contact (song) =

Single by Pierce the Veil

from the album The Jaws of Life
- Released: November 11, 2022
- Recorded: 2021
- Studio: Royal (New Orleans); Marigny (New Orleans)
- Genre: Alternative rock; emo pop
- Length: 4:00
- Label: Fearless
- Songwriters: Vic Fuentes; Curtis Peoples
- Producer: Paul Meany

Pierce the Veil singles chronology
"Pass the Nirvana" (2022)	"Emergency Contact" (2022)	"Even When I'm Not with You" (2023)

"Emergency Contact" is a single by American post hardcore/scene band Pierce the Veil. It was released on November 11, 2022 and is the second single from their fifth studio album, The Jaws of Life. The track peaked at number one on US alternative radio chart in August 2023.

== Background ==
Lead singer Vic Fuentes explains before playing the show live that 'Emergency Contact' is "You know when you're younger, and you go to the doctor and they ask you to put down your emergency contact, in case something goes wrong, and when you're a kid you always put down your mum or dad or your guardian, I just remember that moment in my life when my wife became my emergency contact, the person I love most in the world. And I just thought that was a really romantic moment in a very morbid, fucked up way, so we wrote a song about it."

== Reception ==
The song is a closer representation of Pierce the Veil's change in style as opposed to the previous single, "Pass the Nirvana", the new style was well received and the song went on to peak at number one on the US Alternative Airplay chart in August 2023, along with critical international acclaim, notably Australia's alternative radio station, Triple J, where Pierce the Veil performed the song alongside Radiohead's "Karma Police".

== Music video ==
A music video was released to YouTube along with the song on November 11, 2022. Directed by Marc Klasfeld, the video shows the band in a dark space filled only with their Amplifier stacks, with other scenes of a girl (Mary Mouser) in a bathtub. As of June 2025, the video has received 4.3 million views on the platform.

== Personnel ==
Pierce the Veil

- Vic Fuentes – vocals, guitar
- Tony Perry – guitar
- Jaime Preciado – bass guitar

Additional musicians

- Brad Hargreaves – drums

Technical

- Paul Meany – production, recording production, engineering
- Ted Jensen – mastering
- Adam Hawkins – mixing
- David Garcia Marino – editing, engineering assistance
- Henry Lunetta – mixing assistance
- Steven Williamson – mixing assistance
- Adam Keil – engineering assistance
- Crispin Schroeder – engineering assistance

== Notes ==
1. Via Pierce the Veil on YouTube
