= Vitals (album) =

Studio album by Mutemath
- Released: November 13, 2015
- Recorded: 2014–2015
- Genres: Synth-pop; alternative rock; psychedelic soul; indie pop; blues rock
- Length: 47:47
- Labels: Wojtek; Caroline; Sony Music Australia; Hostess Japan
- Producer: Mutemath

Mutemath chronology
Odd Soul (2011)	Vitals (2015)	Play Dead (2017)

Singles from Vitals
- 1. "Monument" Released: August 18, 2015; 2. "Used To" Released: October 2, 2015

Vitals is the fourth full-length release from New Orleans group Mutemath. The album was released on November 13, 2015. It is the group's first release on their own imprint label Wojtek Records, following their departure from Warner Bros. Records and the dissolution of Teleprompt Records. It is also the first studio album featuring Todd Gummerman since he joined the group in 2011.

== Recording ==
Following 2011's Odd Soul, the band started recording material for their fourth album in 2012, and began playing some of the new material live in 2013. Paul Meany in an interview explained that at the end of 2013, "we had a sobering moment ... [we] listened to what we had, and we had that sinking feeling of like, 'Gosh, this just isn't it. This isn't the record we want.'" Starting over, the band made a resolution to write a new song each day starting January 1, 2014, until they felt they'd "got it – got what this album needs to say and what we feel it should represent about where we're at right now."

Contrasting the recording of Vitals to that of their previous album, Meany has stated that "The challenge for this record was how few notes could we get away with? We would overplay all the time, recording this record, but then it was a process of trying to now skim it back. What are the essential parts of the song? We were trying to see how loud we could let simplicity happen for each song idea." He also explained that the process was highly collaborative, with all band members sharing responsibilities: "Our approach on this record was not, 'All right, you do guitar. You do bass. You do drums.' It was, 'OK, today we're doing drums. Today we're doing synths.' All four of us, speaking into whatever the part was, were trying to find the best part."

== Release ==
The album's title was announced on June 23, 2015. The release date was initially slated to be October 16, 2015, but was later pushed back to November 13. The album was released in Japan on February 24, 2016.

== Critical reception ==
Professional ratings
Review scores
Source	Rating
AbsolutePunk	8/10 stars
AllMusic	4/5 stars
CCM Magazine	4.5/5 stars
Rolling Stone Australia	3/5 stars

Vitals received generally positive reviews upon its release.

== Track listing ==
No.	Title	Length
1.	"Joy Rides"	4:00
2.	"Light Up"	3:41
3.	"Monument"	3:33
4.	"Stratosphere"	3:55
5.	"All I See"	3:47
6.	"Vitals" (instrumental)	3:58
7.	"Composed"	2:54
8.	"Used To"	4:15
9.	"Best of Intentions"	3:34
10.	"Bulletproof" (instrumental)	3:39
11.	"Safe If We Don't Look Down"	4:39
12.	"Remain"	5:52
Total length:		47:47

Cassette edition bonus tracks
No.	Title	Length
13.	"Azteca"	3:46
14.	"Self"	3:17
Total length:		54:50

Japanese bonus tracks
No.	Title	Length
13.	"Somewhere Right"	4:20
14.	"Fine After All"	3:17
Total length:		55:24

== Charts ==
The album debuted at #49 on the Billboard 200 and #32 on Top Album Sales with 10,000 units sold on Billboard charts dated December 5, 2015.

Chart (2015)	Peak position
US Billboard 200	49
US Top Alternative Albums (Billboard)	2
US Top Rock Albums (Billboard)	4
US Independent Albums (Billboard)	1
US Digital Albums (Billboard)	14
US Indie Store Album Sales (Billboard)	10
