= Kaleidoscope Superior =

Studio album by Earthsuit
- Released: June 20, 2000
- Recorded: Nashville, TN
- Genre: Christian rock; reggae rock; rap rock
- Length: 41:32
- Label: Sparrow
- Producer: David Leonard

Earthsuit chronology
Noise for Your Eyes (1998)	Kaleidoscope Superior (2000)	The Rise of Modern Simulation (2003)

Professional ratings
Review scores
Source	Rating
Allmusic	3/5 stars
Cross Rhythms	9/10 stars
Jesus Freak Hideout	4/5 stars

Kaleidoscope Superior is the major label debut by Earthsuit. The album features updated versions of select songs from the band's two independent releases, as well as other new songs. "One Time" was the first single serviced to radio from the album. A music video was also shot for "One Time" and could be seen on Christian television networks as well as late night rotations on MTV2.

== Track listing ==
1. "One Time" (Paul Meany, Roy Mitchell, Dave Rumsey) – 4:20
2. "Wheel" (Meany, Adam LaClave) – 3:45
3. "Whitehorse" (Meany, LaClave, Steve Solomon) – 4:15
4. "Against the Grain" (Meany, LaClave) – 3:27
5. "Do You Enjoy the Distortion?" (Meany, LaClave, Edwin Henriques) – 4:20
6. "Wonder" (Meany, LaClave) – 4:06
7. "Osmosis Land" (Meany, LaClave, Mitchell) – 3:55
8. "Schizophreniac" (Meany, LaClave) – 3:56
9. "Said the Sun to the Shine" (Meany, LaClave, Henriques) – 4:26
10. "Sky Flashings" (Meany, LaClave, Mitchell) – 4:57
