= Mutemath =

American rock band

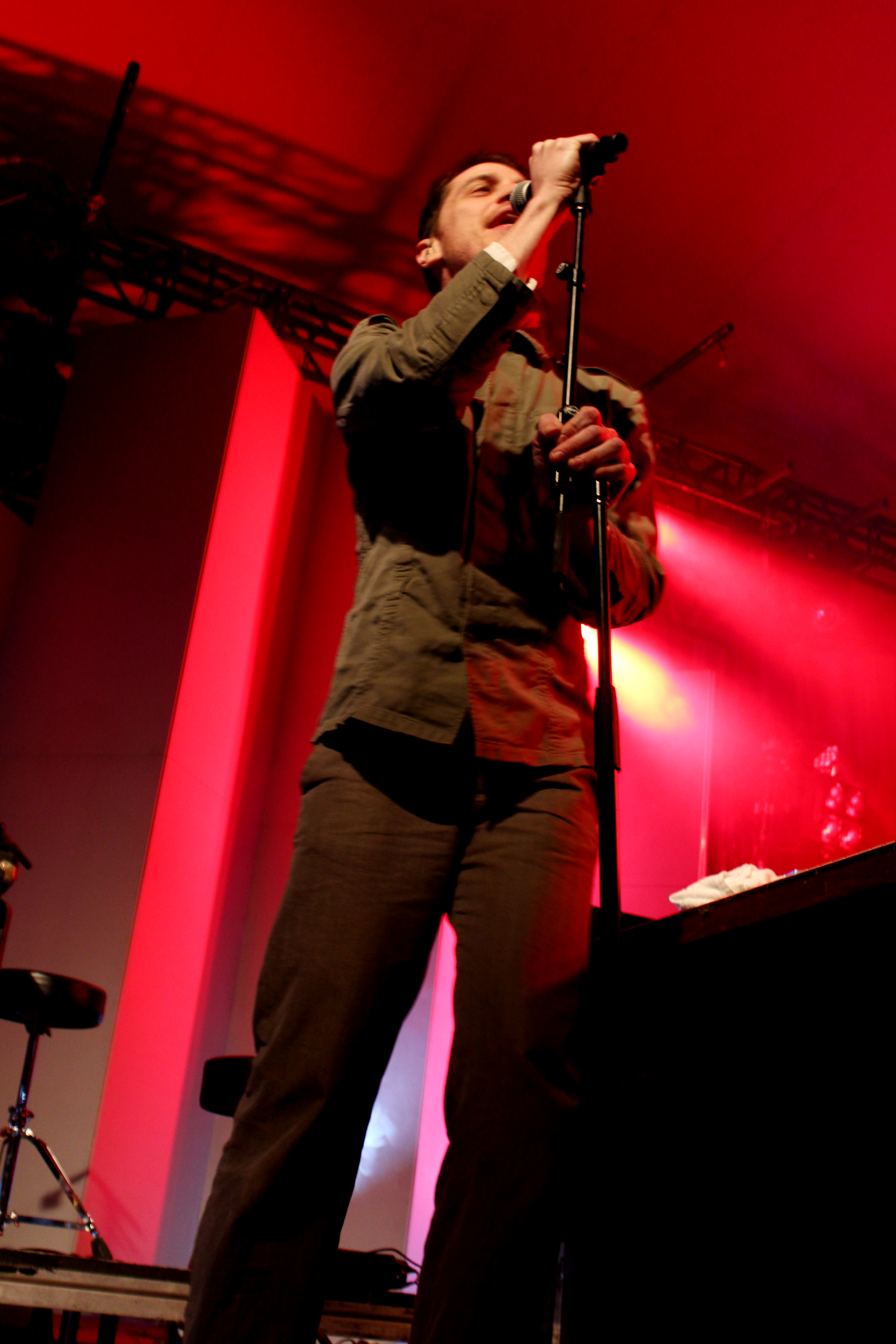
- Paul Meany performing in 2012

Background information
- Origin: New Orleans, Louisiana, U.S.
- Genres: Alternative rock; indie rock; electronica; psychedelic soul; post-rock
- Years active: 2002–present
- Labels: Word; Teleprompt; Warner Bros.; Wojtek
- Members: Paul Meany
- Past members: Darren King; Greg Hill; Jonathan Allen; Roy Mitchell-Cárdenas; Todd Gummerman
- Website: mutemath.com

Mutemath (sometimes styled as MuteMath or MUTEMATH) is an American alternative rock project founded by singer-songwriter, multi-instrumentalist, and record producer Paul Meany. Originally co-founded as a band with Darren King in 2002, Meany decided to continue Mutemath as a solo project following King's departure in 2017. Mutemath draws heavily from influences in 1960s and 1970s soul, psychedelic rock, and jam band styles, utilizing vintage guitars and amplifiers as well as Rhodes keyboards, synthesizers, and other electronic instruments such as the keytar.

== History ==
=== Formation ===
Mutemath started in 2002 as a long-distance collaboration between Paul Meany in New Orleans, Louisiana, and Darren King in Springfield, Missouri. The two had known each other from their work together in Meany's previous band Earthsuit. Occasionally Meany would receive instrumental demo CDs from King. Fairly impressed with his efforts, Meany contacted King and asked if he could mess with the demos a bit, adding some ideas of his own. King obliged and the two would set in motion a sort of songwriting ping-pong match that would carry on for several months.

In February 2002, King moved to New Orleans to work closer with Meany in hopes to at least turn their efforts into some kind of side-project. Calling it "Math", the two explored many of their shared influences ranging from DJ Shadow to Björk, yielding a lot of their earlier works to be more sample based electronica. After Meany's band officially broke up by that summer, King and Meany moved in together into a house they found in Mandeville, Louisiana where they spent all their time writing new songs and considering how to turn their side-project into a full band.

By 2003, they had recruited guitarist Greg Hill, another Springfield, MO, native and longtime friend of King's. All now living in Southern Louisiana, the three worked on expanding their collection of songs while broadening the sound to a more rock infused hybrid. With the addition of more of their collective band influences like the Police and U2 the music began to find a sound of its own. Meany took the early demos to friend and producer Tedd T, who fell in love at first listen. The trio continued to work on demos with Tedd T for a possible EP while playing shows on the side with different bass players experimenting with the idea of eventually becoming a four-piece.

After months of considering different options for their new venture, the group decided to do things on their own and officially changed their name to "Mutemath". Joining up with Tedd T and lawyer/manager Kevin Kookogey, they started an independent label Teleprompt Records. Within a couple months Teleprompt was able to put together a developmental-deal with Warner Music, and Mutemath's debut Reset EP would be released that Fall on Warner's CCM label Word Records in an attempt to capitalize on the group's fan base from Earthsuit. By December 2004, the band finally recruited bass player Roy Mitchell-Cárdenas to become the official fourth member. They began touring to promote the release while using popular social networking sites like MySpace to spread word of the group. As their fan base grew, the band began to see an increasing number of shows sell out by early 2005. By the end of that year, they joined The Music is Much Too Loud Tour opening for Mae and Circa Survive where they began to chronicle their shows and updated their video blogs on a nightly basis gradually attracting more and more people to the Mutemath ground-swell. The band sold over 30,000 copies of Reset EP before the album went out of print in 2006.

=== 2006–2011 ===
In January 2006, the band set out on a tour in support of their self-titled debut album. It was initially independently released in response to Warner Music Group's indecision on what to do with Mutemath's debut LP. So by late 2005, Teleprompt filed suit against Warner Music requesting Mutemath to be released from their contract while Teleprompt would proceed to promote and sell Mutemath's self-titled debut on its own. (see Teleprompt Controversy for more details).

The special edition of the album was only available as a "tour-only" release until it hit the Internet on Teleprompt's online store, selling more than 10,000 copies in its first month. Mutemath landed on the covers of Billboard and Pollstar being featured in Alternative Press, Paste, and Spin as well as on the MTV News program 'You Hear It First'. The group continued to tour vigorously, playing shows to crowds of thousands at festivals such as Bonnaroo, Lollapalooza, Van's Warped Tour, V Festival, CMJ Music Marathon in New York City, and Voodoo Music Experience in their hometown of New Orleans.

After months of legal wrangling with parent label Warner Bros. Records, Teleprompt settled litigation out of court in August 2006 with a re-negotiated contract with Warner.

WBR re-released the band's debut album Mutemath on September 26, 2006. The fully remastered album features reworked tracks from their Reset EP and a bonus limited-edition live EP. The album debuted at No. 17 on Billboard's Top Heatseekers chart.

The band returned to the road in early 2007 with opening dates for The Fray and Wolfmother in various cities and a brief headlining tour in Europe. Flesh And Bones Electric Fun, an exclusive live DVD was released on March 20, 2007, with an accompanying 43-city North American tour that ran through the first of May.

The band also received some unexpected publicity on American Idol when contestant Chris Sligh sang "Typical" on the show's Top 24 episode.

Mutemath's first music video, for "Typical", premiered on YouTube on March 21, 2007. The video features the band performing the song backwards. The video made it on the New York Post Hot List and registered more than 100,000 views in less than four days, going on to be viewed 4.7 million times as of December 2025. It took three weeks for Mutemath to learn their parts backwards. When asked whether singing backwards or drumming backwards was more difficult, Paul Meany answered, "Darren (the drummer) had it the hardest."

"Typical" was also released as Mutemath's first radio single on April 10, 2007. As of late June, the single started receiving major airplay in Modern Rock quickly rising up the Mediabase Alternative chart jumping from No. 115 to No. 65 and was also the second most added song on Alternative stations the week of June 13, 2007. The single then jumped to No. 36 the first week of August 2007, a position it held for six weeks before it moved to a peak position of 35.

"Typical" was featured on a television commercial for the Discovery Channel, featuring clips from shows like Man vs. Wild, Deadliest Catch and Dirty Jobs.

The group made limited appearances at various summer festivals in mid-2007 in order to work on writing and recording material for their forthcoming sophomore record. The band's debut performance at the Bonnaroo Music Festival coincided with their second appearance on The Late Late Show with Craig Ferguson.

The group appeared on Transformers: The Album, released on July 3, 2007, performing the "Transformers Theme" in conjunction with the live-action film directed by Michael Bay (although the song did not appear in the film) and made a television appearance on the Late Show with David Letterman on July 17. The group was in the running for MTV2 and Virgin Mobile's Book The Band vote to open for the US Virgin Festival in Baltimore, Maryland in August (Aiden won the Book The Band contest).

Mutemath's debut album reappeared on Billboard's Top Heatseekers Chart on August 4, 2007, at No. 28, while the single "Typical" debuted at No. 39 on Billboard's US Modern Rock Chart the same week.

The band hit the road in support of the single in September 2007 with support from Eisley, which included two television appearances. The first was September 19, their second appearance on Jimmy Kimmel Live!. The show aired a taped performance of the band recreating the video the single "Typical" that was taped in front of the studio audience and then played back in reverse for the broadcast. Their second television appearance was their debut on NBC's Late Night with Conan O'Brien performing "Break the Same" for the first time on television on October 17.

On November 12, 2007, Atlantic Records announced that the band would join Alanis Morissette on Matchbox Twenty's Exile in America Tour, which kicked off in Hollywood, Florida, on January 25, 2008, and ran through mid-March. On December 6, 2007, the group was nominated for a Grammy Award for their short form music video for "Typical". "Control", the second and final radio single from Mutemath was released January 15, 2008. The music video for the single was filmed in Nashville in January, but its distribution was halted due to copyright issues in regards to a previously released clip from a European group; nevertheless, the video can be found on their Armistice Live DVD. The band also released the companion album to their 2007 live DVD, Flesh And Bones Electric Fun: Mutemath Live, via iTunes on January 29, 2008. "Typical" was added as a downloadable song for the Rock Band series in early 2009.

In November 2008, the group released "Spotlight" on the Twilight film soundtrack album, to favorable reviews. The song was the first single from Armistice and was released digitally February 10, 2009, on the Spotlight EP, which included B side tracks and a remix of the song by Son Lux. The group performed "Spotlight" for the first time on The Tonight Show on January 15, 2009, featuring guest appearances from LaClave and Allen from Club of the Sons and Jeremy Larson, all of whom have worked on the upcoming album. The EP was also released on limited edition vinyl on March 24, 2009.

The group went to work writing and recording their second full-length record in their home studio in New Orleans. The album, Armistice, was released in the United States on Teleprompt Records/Warner Bros. Records on August 18, 2009.

During the recording of the album, short videos were posted to the band's YouTube profile. These videos documented the work going on in the studio, including street interviews where New Orleans locals were shown samples of the album (which couldn't be heard in the video), recording their reactions. Any clips of actual music from the new album was presented in such a way that it only hinted at what the album would eventually sound like.

On April 4, 2008, Goodwin Films announced they were working on a documentary film about the making of Mutemath's new record.

According to the biography, the group had almost called it quits during the writing of the album. The band had written about 16 songs in the three years spent on the road touring and had expected to cut the list to 10 after settling down to record in their New Orleans home studio. Weeks of working with old ideas and bickering between the bandmates led the group to begin searching for an outside producer to help focus the group and stabilize the tension. During this search, the group met producer Dennis Herring and after hearing his input, decided to scrap all the previously written material and start from scratch, bringing Herring on board as producer of the album. The band worked over the next three months writing almost 20 new songs that would shape Armistice. The band then spent time at Herring's studio in Oxford, Mississippi, recording the final touches of the album.

On January 14, 2009, King said in an interview that after a break for the holidays, they would "get back to recording in hopes of having everything done in March so that the album can come out in August. It has taken way longer than we would have ever imagined but we're just not done with it yet." Additionally, he mentioned that the album was Mutemath's first album which involved collaboration among all four members of the band.

The title for the sophomore record was confirmed as Armistice on May 27, 2009 in an interview on InsideBayArea.com and then confirmed on the same day on the Mutemath forums Teleprompt Records and Warner Bros. Records made a joint press release on June 9, 2009, announcing the details of the album release, including the name Armistice the album cover, and track listing, as well as the official US release date of August 18.

Armistice debuted at No. 18 on the Billboard 200, with over 18,000 units sold in the first week. The album also charted at No. 4 on Billboard Rock charts and No. 3 on the Billboard Digital Albums and Billboard Alternative Albums charts the same week.

Upon finishing the 2010 summer tour, the band announced that they would release a DVD/CD combo entitled Armistice Live on October 12, 2010. Pre-orders included bonus live rarities "Electrify" and "Goodbye", recorded in Japan during the "Armistice" tour.

The band began writing and recording material for their third album in the middle of 2010, shortly after completing their spring tour in support of 30 Seconds to Mars. On April 4, 2011, it was announced that the album had been completed. It was also announced that guitarist Greg Hill had left the band in October 2010. Snippets of "Cavalries", "One More", "Equals", "Prytania", "Walking Paranoia" and "Odd Soul" were released on one of the band's YouTube channels. On June 28, 2011, it was announced that the album would be titled Odd Soul and would be released on October 4, 2011. On July 18, 2011 the full music video and interactive website for "Odd Soul" were released to the public. On July 29, MuteMath released their VIP tour package for presale on their official site, giving away the name of their first single, "Blood Pressure", available August 8. On August 10, 2011, Todd Gummerman announced on his blog that he was officially replacing Greg Hill as the band's guitar player. The band supported Linkin Park and Incubus on the Honda Civic Tour.

=== 2011–present ===
In an interview with NOLA.com in November 2013, Roy Mitchell-Cárdenas said, "We have a lot of songs, and we're trying to whittle down what those main songs are going to be that seem to have a common thread between them all to make for this album." He goes on to explain that the production of Odd Soul was a unique process since Todd Gummerman was not yet a part of the band and that all guitar parts were written by all members of the band, who are all multi-instrumentalists. It is worth noting that the band had not yet released material written by Todd Gummerman, and the band has not discussed any writing processes including him, although certain posts in Darren King's Vine account show Gummerman present and active during the writing process.

When asked about what kind of influences and sounds the band has in mind for the future potential album release, Mitchell-Cárdenas stated, "Anything is fair play for us, as long as we can pull it off convincingly." Paul Meany also responded to a fan question via Twitter in January 2014 asking about the amount of music the band had written saying, "I can tell [you] we've written more songs for this record than for the past 3 combined."

On September 25, 2013, Darren King posted a vine of a sample of a new song the band was working on. This was followed on November 9 when King posted a short clip of Gummerman and what appears to be Mitchell-Cárdenas at work in the process of writing new material. In 2014 Mutemath begin playing new material live. Songs included "Monument", "Stratosphere", "Light Up" and "Used To".

MuteMath officially announced the title of their new album as Vitals on May 21, 2015, via their official Facebook page.

Vitals was released on November 13, 2015. The band toured in the US and Europe during the spring of 2016 on the Vitals World Tour in support of the album with special guests Nothing But Thieves and Paper Route. A planned Australian leg of the tour was cancelled so the band could join Twenty One Pilots on their Emotional Roadshow World Tour, which took place in Summer 2016.

After completing the tour with Twenty One Pilots, the band announced their first remix album Changes. The album consists of new versions of tracks from Vitals with contributions from Yachtclub, JT Daly, and Flint Eastwood and features the new title track as the single from the release. The album was released on September 23, 2016.

On May 3, 2017, Roy Mitchell-Cárdenas announced his departure from MuteMath and the group announced that Jonathan Allen would be joining the group on tour starting May 6, 2017.

Mutemath began posting snippets of a new song on their official website on June 4, 2017 counting down to the release of the single "Hit Parade" on June 6, 2017. The press release for the song revealed that it is the first single from the group's upcoming fifth studio album, Play Dead, to be released September 8, 2017. Meany stated that the record took five years to record and work on it began before their 2015 release Vitals. The album release will be accompanied by a fall headlining tour. The tour was announced on June 12, 2017, and will include dates in the United Kingdom, Europe, and the United States.

On August 8, 2017, Paul Meany announced that Darren King left the band and would not be accompanying Mutemath on the Play Dead Live Tour. Paul Meany later stated he would be continuing to make music under the name Mutemath as a solo project.

On November 19, 2018, Paul Meany released a video for a new song "Voice In the Silence", and a new four song EP of the same name was released on December 5, 2018. This EP was the first Mutemath release as a solo project of Paul Meany. The limited-pressing vinyl version of the Voice in the Silence EP contained four bonus tracks that were not included on the streaming version of the EP. "Love Light a Way" was released in December 2021. Meany later announced a solo album under his own name, titled Motivational Speaker, that was originally set to release in 2023. It was delayed multiple times; in the interim, Meany announced and released the Distance EP in late 2024 under the Mutemath brand, named for a bonus track from the Voice in the Silence EP that received a wide release for the first time on the Distance EP.

== Religion ==
Mutemath has resisted being classified as a Christian band, even suing their record label Warner Brothers over being marketed as such. Paul Meany stated in an interview in 2006 that if his previous band Earthsuit (a Christian act) "inspired anything, it was what not to do." Drummer Darren King has also stated that he does not consider the band to be Christian. While Armistice explored themes of doubt and pessimism that the band has gone so far as to call "atheistic", Meany stated that the idea for the album Odd Soul was "loosely based on our upbringing in what I guess you could call eccentric Christianity," and King further explained that they wanted to celebrate their "weird religious roots." Rolling Stone has also noted this connection, calling them "kinda sorta a Christian rock band."

== Band members ==
Current

- Paul Meany – lead vocals, keyboards, piano, synthesizer, guitar (2002–present); bass (2002–2004; 2018–present); drums, percussion (2017–present)

Former

- Darren King – drums, percussion (2002–2017)
- Greg Hill – guitar, vocals (2003–2010)
- Jonathan Allen – bass, keyboard, drums, guitar (2004, 2017–2018)
- Roy Mitchell-Cárdenas – bass, guitar, keyboards, vocals (2004–2017)
- Todd Gummerman – guitar, keyboards, synthesizer, percussion, violin, programming, vocals (2011–2018)

Touring

- David Hutchison – drums (2017)

Collaborative contributors

- Adam LaClave (2002–2018)
- Roy Mitchell-Cárdenas (2017–2018)
- David Hutchison (2024)

Timeline

== Discography ==
=== Studio albums ===
List of studio albums, with selected chart positions and sales
Title	Album details	Peak chart positions				Sales
Title	Album details	US	US Alt.	US Rock	AUS Hit.	Sales
Mutemath	Released: January 19, 2006; Label: Teleprompt, Warner Bros.; Formats: CD, DI, LP	—	—	—	—	
Armistice	Released: August 18, 2009; Label: Teleprompt, Warner Bros.; Formats: CD, DI	18	3	4	—	
Odd Soul	Released: October 4, 2011; Label: Teleprompt, Warner Bros.; Formats: CD, DI	24	7	8	3	US: 54,000
Vitals	Released: November 13, 2015; Label: Wojtek; Formats: CD, DI	49	2	4	5	
Play Dead	Released: September 8, 2017; Label: Wojtek; Formats: CD, DI	112	14	20	—	
"—" denotes a release that did not chart.

=== Live albums ===
List of live albums
Title	Album details
Flesh and Bones Electric Fun	Released: March 20, 2007; Label: Teleprompt, Warner Bros.; Formats: DI
Armistice Live	Released: October 12, 2010; Label: Teleprompt, Warner Bros.; Format: CD

=== Compilation albums ===
List of compilation albums
Title	Album details
Spotlight	Released: December 20, 2019; Label: Warner Music Group

=== Remix albums ===
List of remix albums
Title	Album details
Changes	Released: September 23, 2016; Label: Wojtek; Formats: DI, LP

=== EPs ===
List of EPs
Title	EP details
Reset	Released: September 28, 2004; Label: Teleprompt, Warner Bros.; Formats: CD, DI, LP
Live at the El Rey	Released: September 26, 2006; Label: Teleprompt, Warner Bros.; Formats: CD, DI
Spotlight	Released: February 10, 2009; Label: Teleprompt, Warner Bros.; Formats: CD, DI, LP
Odd Soul – Live in DC	Released: August 3, 2012; Label: Warner Bros.; Format: DI
TOPxMM	Released: December 19, 2016; Label: Fueled by Ramen; Format: DI
Voice in the Silence	Released: December 5, 2018; Label: Wojtek; Format: DI
Distance EP	Released: December 7th, 2024; Label: Wojtek; Format: DI

=== Singles ===
List of singles, with selected chart positions
Title	Year	Peak chart positions						Album
Title	Year	US Bub.	US Alt.	US Christ.	CAN Rock	MEX Air.	JPN	Album
"Control"	2004	—	—	40	—	—	—	Reset
"Peculiar People"	2005	—	—	32	—	—	—	Reset
"Typical"	2007	—	33	—	47	—	—	Mutemath
"Chaos"	2007	—	—	—	—	—	—	Mutemath
"Transformers Theme"	2007	20	—	—	—	—	—	Transformers: The Album
"Control"	2008	—	—	—	—	—	—	Mutemath
"Spotlight"	2009	—	—	—	—	—	—	Armistice
"The Nerve"	2009	—	—	—	—	—	—	Armistice
"Backfire"	2009	—	—	—	—	—	—	Armistice
"Odd Soul"	2011	—	—	—	—	—	—	Odd Soul
"Blood Pressure"	2011	—	28	—	—	35	71	Odd Soul
"Allies"	2012	—	—	—	—	—	—	Odd Soul
"Monument"	2015	—	35	—	—	—	—	Vitals
"Used To"	2015	—	—	—	—	—	—	Vitals
"Changes"	2016	—	—	—	—	—	—	Changes
"Hit Parade"	2017	—	—	—	—	—	—	Play Dead
"Stroll On"	2017	—	—	—	—	—	—	Play Dead
"—" denotes a release that did not chart.

=== Compilations and other media ===
- "TOPxMM" – with Twenty One Pilots (2016)
- "Allies" – Need For Speed: Most Wanted (2012 video game)
- "Blood Pressure" – Asphalt 8: Airborne
- "Chaos" – Aware 11
- "Transformers Theme" – Transformers: The Album
- "You Are Mine" appeared in the 2008 movies Never Back Down and The Sisterhood of the Traveling Pants 2
- "Spotlight (Twilight Mix)"
- "Typical" appeared in The Stepfather (2009), and was also used in a Discovery Channel commercial
- "Valium" – Soundtrack 90210 (2009)
- "J Train (Math Remix)" is a remix of tobyMac's "J Train", on his remix album called Re:Mix Momentum

== Awards and nominations ==
=== Awards ===
- Dove Award 2005 Best Modern Rock Song - "Control".

=== Nominations ===
- Grammy Award 2008 Best Short Form Music Video - "Typical".

== Filmography ==
- Flesh and Bones Electric Fun (Teleprompt/WBR, 2007) — DVD Release Date: March 20, 2007
- Armistice Live (Teleprompt/WBR/Goodwin Films, 2010) — DVD Release Date: October 12, 2010

== Tours ==
- Early 2005 – The Reset Tour with Mat Kearney
- Late 2005 – The Music Is Much Too Loud Tour with Mae and Circa Survive
- Early 2006 – The Album Release Tour with Vedera, The Working Title, Under the Influence of Giants and Lovedrug
- Late 2006 – Tour with Shiny Toy Guns, The Whigs, Jonezetta, and Club of the Sons
- Early 2007 – SXSW & Flesh And Bones Electric Fun Tour with The Cinematics, Someone Still Loves You Boris Yeltsin, Club of the Sons, and one show with Wolfmother
- Late 2007 – Tour with Eisley
- Late 2009 – Armistice Tour
- Late 2011 – Odd Soul Introduction Tour
- Early 2012 – Odd Soul Tour
- Early 2016 – Vitals World Tour with Nothing But Thieves
- 2016 – Emotional Roadshow World Tour with Twenty One Pilots
- Late 2017 – Play Dead Tour with Colony House and ROMES
