= Darren King =

American drummer and percussionist (born 1982)

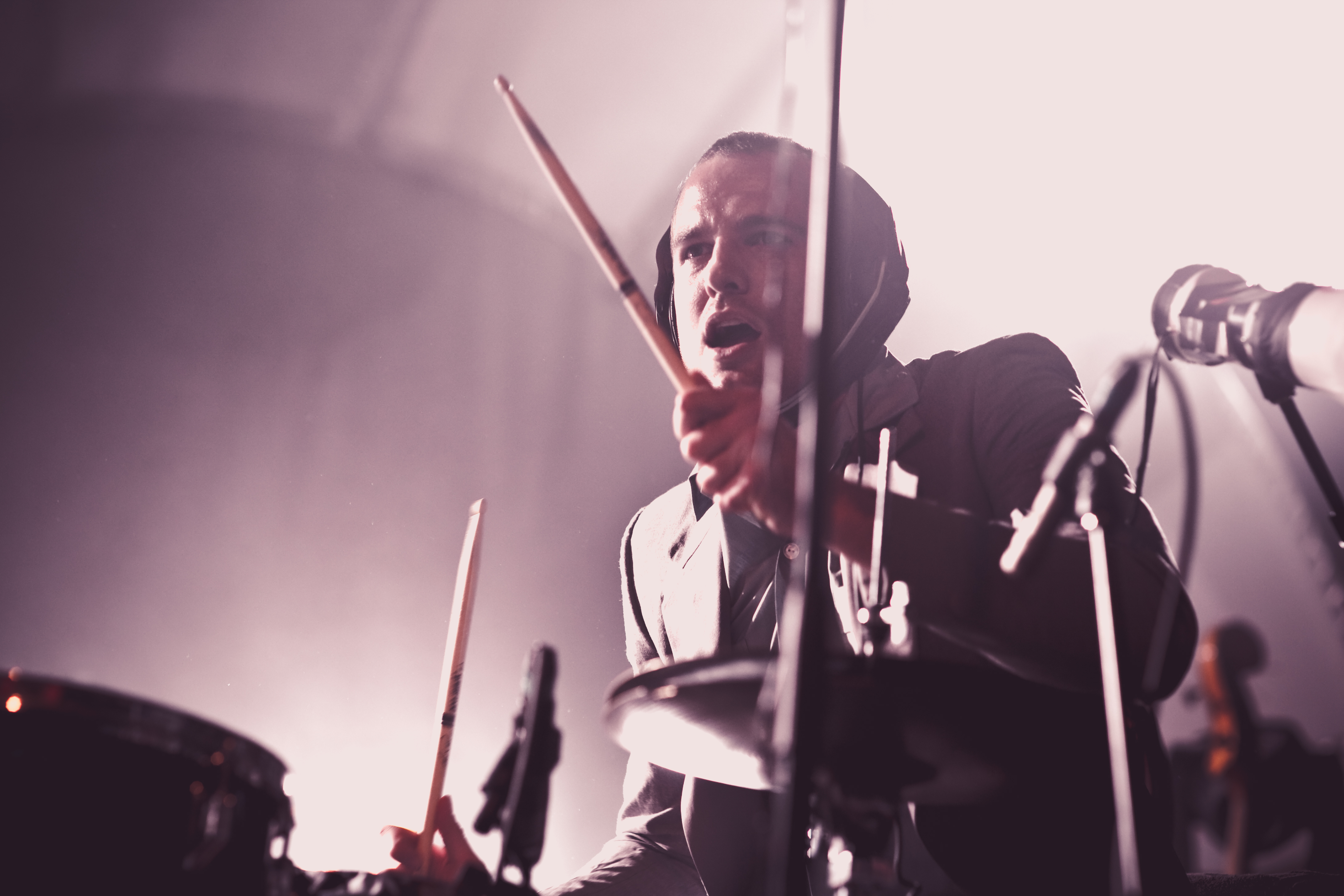
- King performing in Portland, Oregon in 2009

Background information
- Also known as: DK the Drummer
- Born: June 25, 1982 (age 43)
- Origin: Marshfield, Missouri
- Genres: Electronica; Christian rock; alternative rock; indie rock; pop; rock; ambient
- Occupations: Musician, drummer, multi-instrumentalist
- Instruments: Drums; percussion; guitar; keyboards; synthesizer; bass guitar
- Years active: 2002–present
- Labels: Teleprompt; Warner Bros.
- Website: dkthedrummer.com

Darren Charles King (born June 25, 1982) is an American drummer and percussionist, best known for his association with the band Mutemath until his permanent departure in August 2017. He played the drums for the New Orleans–based Christian rock band Earthsuit for a short time. In concert he is often seen wearing a pair of headphones gaffer-taped to his head for foldback, something previously done by The Who drummer, Keith Moon. King grew up in the small town of Marshfield, Missouri.

On October 27, 2010, Switchfoot's Song "Yet" was released for free download as a remix by Darren King. He also remixed Hillsong United's "Love is War" which was released on their White Album (the remix project) in 2014.

King played additional instrumentation on the Kanye West and Travis Scott collaboration "Piss on Your Grave" which was released on Scott's debut album Rodeo (2015), as well as on another Kanye West song, "Real Friends".

King was heavily involved in the creation of Say Anything's seventh LP, I Don't Think It Is. His brother-in-law Max Bemis says that King "[collaborated] fully on its production and creation."

On July 24, 2010, he married Stacy DuPree, vocalist and keyboardist of Eisley. The couple have two daughters; Scarlett, who was born in October 2012, two hours after King returned from a show in Baton Rouge, and Solènne, born in October 2016. They have worked together professionally along with Jeremy Larson, forming the band Sucré.

On August 8, 2017, Paul Meany announced that Darren King had left Mutemath and would not be accompanying Mutemath on the Play Dead Live Tour. Since leaving the band, King has been performing as a drummer, DJ and front man under the name of DK the Drummer, with plans to release an album entitled Lockers Volume One.

On May 31, 2024, King released his new album Temporal. In 2025, when allegations of sexual abuse against singer Michael Tait came to light, King publicly came out and stated that he was a victim of Tait's.
