= Paul Meany =

American musician (born 1976)

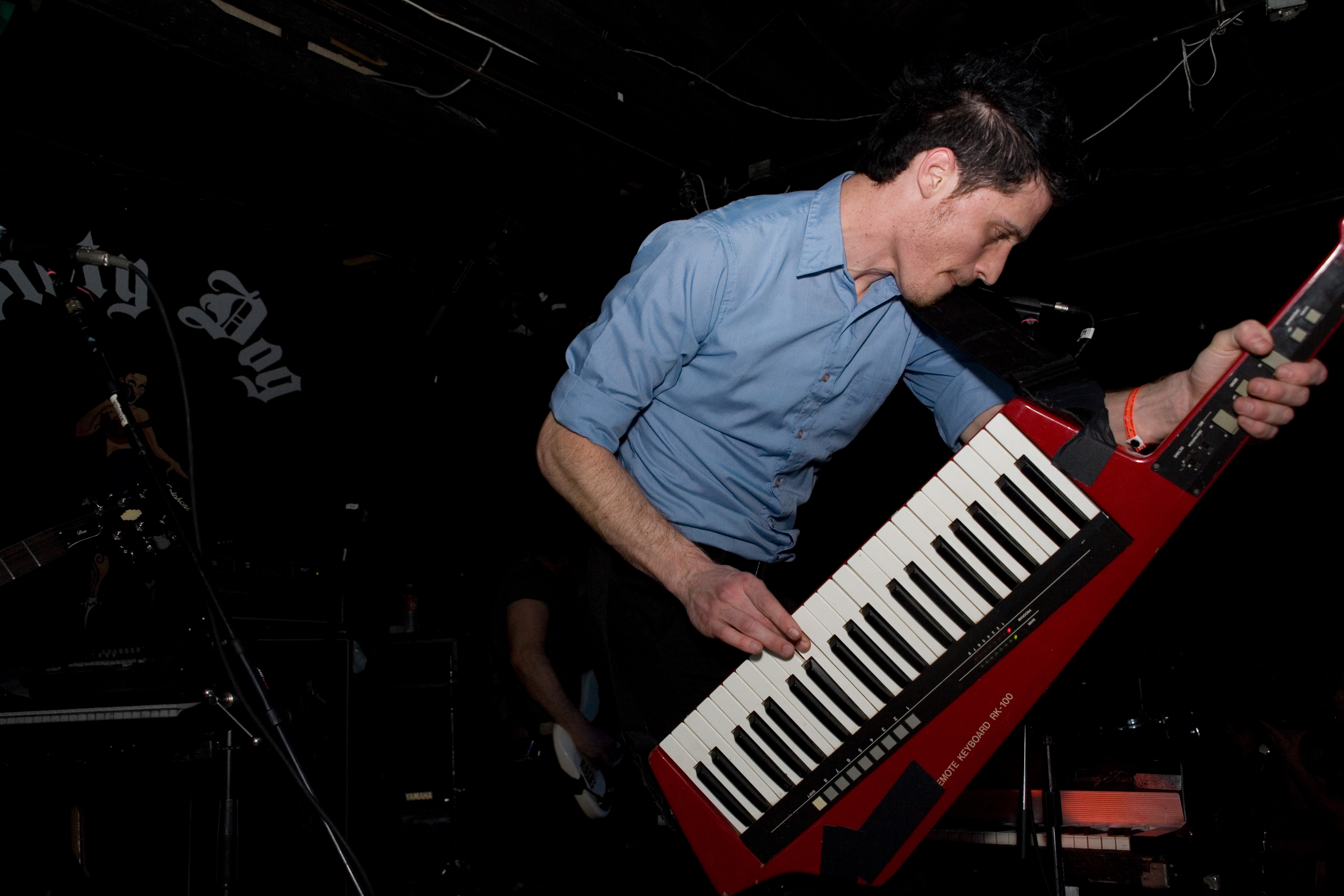
- Meany performing with Mutemath in 2007

Background information
- Born: July 2, 1976 (age 50)
- Origin: New Orleans, Louisiana, U.S.
- Genres: Electronica; indie rock; reggae; alternative rock; post-rock; trip-hop; psychedelic soul
- Occupations: Musician; singer; songwriter; record producer
- Instruments: Vocals; keyboards; bass; guitar; drums; percussion; sampler
- Years active: 1995–present
- Member of: Mutemath
- Formerly of: Earthsuit; Macrosick

Paul Meany (born July 2, 1976) is an American singer-songwriter, multi-instrumentalist, music director, and record producer. He is most notable for being the lead singer and keyboardist for the alternative rock project Mutemath, of which he is the sole member since 2017. In his producing career he is best known for co-producing and collaborating with much of Twenty One Pilots' work since 2017. He has also done production for Pierce the Veil and Yungblud.

As a solo artist, he released his first two singles, "No Such Thing" and "Fear On Your Side", followed by The Distance (EP), in 2024. The following year, he released his debut full-length studio album, Forever Phase, in September 2025.

== Career ==
While under the moniker "Math" (the precursor to Mutemath), Paul Meany remixed the song "J Train" from TobyMac's debut studio album Momentum (2001). The remix appeared as the first track on the album Re:Mix Momentum (2003) by TobyMac, and included vocals from Meany.

Meany has continued to work on many various projects outside of Mutemath, producing tracks for Forenn and Kind, as well as the debut EP of bandmate Jonathan Allen. Meany was the featured vocalist on Steve Angello single "Breaking Kind" released on August 4, 2017 as well as Seven Lions and Jason Ross' single "Higher Love" released on January 13, 2017.

After Mutemath and Warner Bros. Records parted ways in 2015 and the dissolution of the Teleprompt partnership, Meany launched his own independent label, Wojtek Records, based in New York. Mutemath's fourth and fifth full-length albums and subsequent remix projects were all released through Wojtek, in partnership with Caroline Records.

Meany was one of the co-founders of the independent label Teleprompt Records that has since been dissolved. Prior to forming Mutemath with drummer Darren King, Meany was the keyboardist and backing vocalist for the rock band Earthsuit and provided the same for the beginning stages of another Adam LaClave-fronted rock band, Macrosick. Meany has also co-produced tracks for Jeremy Larson and another Earthsuit spin-off, Club of the Sons.

In 2003, Meany collaborated on an LP entitled Elevator Music, released by Victory Fellowship Church prior to Hurricane Katrina, and was later used as a fund-raising initiative to support victims. The album, comprising fifteen contemporary worship tracks, was recorded live at Victory Fellowship Church, with Meany providing lead vocals.

Meany assisted in producing much of Twenty One Pilots' fifth studio album, Trench (2018). He also contributed to the standalone single "Level of Concern" in 2020, which was recorded and released during the start of the COVID-19 pandemic in the United States. Meany previously worked with the duo alongside his former bandmates to "reimagine" and produce the extended play TOPxMM (2016), which included reimagined versions of four songs from their fourth studio album Blurryface (2015), and the single "Heathens", as well as a live 20-minute video of the bands performing it together in the studio. He assisted in the production of the duo's sixth studio album, Scaled and Icy (2021), was a part of the live backing band for the album's associated tours, and also acted as a musical director for them. In 2022 Meany helped to produce their MTV Unplugged performance and subsequent live album. Meany co-produced the duo's seventh studio album Clancy (2024) in its entirety. He also co-produced their single "The Line" (2024), which was created for the season two soundtrack of the Netflix series Arcane. Meany co-produced the duo's album Breach, which released on September 12, 2025.

Meany produced "Creature", the closing track off of indie rock band Half Alive's debut album, Now, Not Yet (2019). In 2020 and 2021, Meany worked with rock band The Blue Stones, producing their second album Hidden Gems (2021). In 2022, Meany helped produce indie rock band The Wombats' fifth studio album Fix Yourself, Not the World.

Meany helped produce the fifth studio album for California post-hardcore band Pierce the Veil, The Jaws of Life (2023), in its entirety; the album peaked at 14 on the Billboard 200.
