= Teleprompt Records =

- Founded: 2003
- Founder: Tedd T.; Paul Meany; Kevin Kookogey
- Defunct: 2015
- Status: Defunct
- Distributor: Warner Music Group
- Genre: Indie
- Country of origin: U.S.
- Location: Franklin, Tennessee
- Official website: teleprompt.com

Teleprompt Records was an independent record label that was formed in 2003 by record producer Tedd T, keyboardist and Mutemath vocalist Paul Meany, and manager Kevin Kookogey. The label was formed to promote and distribute music for Meany's band Mutemath. The label was based in Franklin, Tennessee, and had an exclusive distribution deal with Warner Bros. Records. Mutemath was the only artist on the roster. As of 2015, the relationship between Teleprompt and Warner Music Group has been dissolved, and Teleprompt operations have been suspended. Mutemath has formed an independent label, Wojtek Records, to serve as Teleprompt's successor.

== Controversy ==
In mid-2005, Teleprompt Records engaged Warner Music Group in litigation involving the marketing and distribution of Mutemath as a Warner artist. Teleprompt claimed that the marketing of Mutemath as a "Christian" band on WB's Word Records constituted breach of contract and negligent misrepresentation. Meany and Kookogey both made public statements regarding the action via various media outlets, including MTV and Billboard, the latter of which ran a cover story on the incident. Warner never made a public statement. Meany's version of the story claims that they had an agreement to be represented by the mainstream Warner label from the beginning and that WBR was continuously refusing to honor their end of the bargain. When the two parties entered litigation, all the rights to Mutemath's previously released work on Reset EP remained with Warner, and the group opted to release their debut LP on their own without any previously recorded material as a measure to avoid more conflict. The suit was settled out of court as of August 10, 2006, with a newly forged contract and exclusive distribution deal with Warner Bros. Records, who re-released the group's LP on WBR in September 2006.

== Roster ==
- Mutemath

== See also ==
- List of record labels
