= Dealer =

Dealer may refer to:

== Film and TV ==
- Dealers (film), a 1989 British film
- Dealers (TV series), a reality television series where five art and antique dealers bid on items
- The Dealer (film), filmed in 2008 and released in 2010
- Dealer (TV series) a 2021 series

== Gaming ==
- Dealer (card game), the player who deals the cards in a card game
  - Croupier, the player who deals cards, or the employee of a gaming establishment who deals the cards
  - Poker dealer, the player who deals cards, or the employee of a gaming establishment who deals the cards
- Dealer, a term in contract bridge for the player who makes the first call in the auction in the game

== Music ==
- Dealer (band), a Nu-Metalcore band based out of Australia, formed in 2019
- Dealer (album), the second studio album by American emo revival band Foxing
- The Dealer (album), a 1966 album by jazz drummer/bandleader Chico Hamilton
- The Dealers, a 1964 album by jazz musician Mal Waldron
- "The Dealer" (song), a song by Stevie Nicks
- "Dealer", a song by Deep Purple from their 1975 album, Come Taste the Band
- "Dealer", a song by Traffic from their 1967 album, Mr. Fantasy and later covered by Santana on their 1978 album, Inner Secrets
- "Dealer", a song by Lana Del Rey from her 2021 album Blue Banisters
- "Dealer", a song by Ayo Maff and Fireboy DML

== Sales ==
- Merchant, someone who trades in commodities produced by other people
- Salesperson, someone who sells goods or service on behalf of the owner
- Dealer (franchising), a person who sells on behalf of a company or organization, particularly in the automobile industry
- Antique dealer, someone who sells antiques
- Art dealer or gallerist, a person or company that buys and sells works of art
- Broker-dealer, a business firm that buys and sells securities before selling the securities to customers
- Car dealership, a business that sells new or used cars at the retail level
- Drug dealer, a person who sells illegal drugs

== See also ==
- Deal (disambiguation)
- Dealership (disambiguation)
- Death Dealer (disambiguation)
- Drug Dealer (disambiguation)
- Lady Double Dealer (disambiguation)
