= Rage (Attila album) =

Studio album by Attila
- Released: May 11, 2010
- Recorded: February 5 – 19, 2010
- Studio: Breakroom Studios, Portland, Oregon
- Genre: Metalcore; deathcore
- Length: 27:00
- Label: Artery
- Producer: Stephan Hawkes, Eric Rushing

Attila chronology
Soundtrack to a Party (2008)	Rage (2010)	Outlawed (2011)

Singles from Rage
- 1. "Rage" Released: 2010

Rage is the third studio album by American metalcore band Attila. The album was released on May 11, 2010, through Artery Recordings. It is the band's debut release on the label. The album charted on Billboard US Heatseekers chart at number 15.

The album was produced by Stephan Hawkes, who has previously worked with such bands as Burning the Masses and American Me.

== Track listing ==
No.	Title	Length
1.	"The End"	0:25
2.	"Make It Sick"	2:51
3.	"The Invitation"	2:56
4.	"Rage"	3:34
5.	"Lights Out"	3:12
6.	"Temper"	3:10
7.	"Girls Don't Lie"	2:51
8.	"Strikeout"	1:06
9.	"Cheyenne 420"	2:51
10.	"Jumanji"	3:59
Total length:		27:00

== Personnel ==
Attila

- Chris Fronzak – vocals
- Nate Salameh – rhythm guitar
- Chris Linck – lead guitar
- Paul Ollinger – bass
- Sean Heenan – drums, percussion

Production

- Produced and engineered by Stephan Hawkes
- Executive production by Eric Rushing (The Artery Foundation)
- A&R, management and layout by Mike Milford
- Artwork by Aaron Crawford
