= Guilty Pleasure (Attila album) =

2014 album by Attila

Studio album by Attila
- Released: November 24, 2014
- Genre: Metalcore; nu metal; rap metal
- Length: 37:36
- Label: Artery
- Producer: Joey Sturgis

Attila chronology
About That Life (2013)	Guilty Pleasure (2014)	Chaos (2016)

Singles from Guilty Pleasure
- 1. "Proving Grounds" Released: October 20, 2014; 2. "Horsepig" Released: November 8, 2014

Guilty Pleasure is the sixth studio album by American metalcore band Attila. The album was released on November 24, 2014, through Artery Recordings and is the band's fourth and final release on the label. This album is also the last album to feature rhythm guitarist, Nate Salameh, who appeared on their four previous full-length releases and left shortly before the album release and only appeared in the music video of the song "Proving Grounds" but not "Hate Me" and "Rebel".

The album is the third and last by the band to be produced by Joey Sturgis who has previously worked with such bands as The Devil Wears Prada, Emmure, We Came as Romans, Asking Alexandria, and Miss May I, and also with their frontman's, Chris Fronzak, on his first solo album, Party People's Anthem, the next year.

== Release ==
On October 7, 2014, the band announced the album. On October 20, 2014, the band released the album's lead single, "Proving Grounds". On November 8, 2014, the band released the album's second single, "Horsepig". The album was released on November 24, 2014.

== Composition ==
Mussically, Guilty Pleasure has been described as metalcore, nu metal, and rap metal. Lead vocalist, Chris "Fronz" Fronzak described the album as the "heaviest album we've ever written...It still has our signature sound but it's a new refreshing twist. Lyrically, I really expanded my horizons. I wrote the most personal song I've ever written on this album. I still have some ignorant party hits, but I also drop some serious knowledge on this album...Open up your ears and take it all in; we're about to drop the best album of 2014."

== Reception ==
Professional ratings
Review scores
Source	Rating
AllMusic	2.5/5 stars
Kill Your Stereo	2.5/5 stars
Metal Hammer	1.5/5 stars

Guilty Pleasure received generally negative reviews from critics. James Christopher Monger of AllMusic stated that "longtime fans...will find much to love/hate here...[and] what the album lacks in diversity it more than makes up for in sheer volume." According to Kill Your Stereo, the "record’s ‘guilty pleasure’ condition is only applicable to those who can stomach this level of crude immaturity." Luke Morton of Metal Hammer criticized the album's lyrics, stating, "Consistent, gratuitous swearing and screaming about “bitches” sucking ol’ Fronzie’s dick fails to be either offensive or funny – instead, it simply smacks of playground teasing and name-calling."

== Commercial performance ==
Guilty Pleasure marked the biggest sales week for Attila in their career, selling over 18,500 copies. However, it did not break the record for highest chart position, debuting only at number 54 on the Billboard 200.

== Track listing ==
No.	Title	Length
1.	"Pizza, Sex, and Trolls"	1:54
2.	"Hate Me"	3:42
3.	"Rebel"	3:18
4.	"Guilty Pleasure"	3:54
5.	"I've Got Your Back"	3:26
6.	"Proving Grounds"	3:28
7.	"I Am Satan"	0:21
8.	"Break My Addiction"	3:00
9.	"Horsepig"	4:00
10.	"Dirty Dirty"	3:26
11.	"Fake Friends"	3:12
12.	"Don't Be Basic"	0:20
13.	"The Cure"	3:15
Total length:		37:36

== Personnel ==
Attila

- Chris "Fronz" Fronzak – vocals
- Chris Linck – lead guitar
- Nate Salameh – rhythm guitar
- Sean Heenan – drums
- Kalan Blehm – bass

Production

- Produced by Joey Sturgis and Kalan Blehm
- Engineered by Nick Scott
- Mixed by Joey Sturgis and Joel Wanasek
- Mastered, vocal engineering and editing by Joey Sturgis @ 37 Recording Studio, Detroit, Michigan
- Drum engineering and editing by Joseph Hall
- A&R by Mike Milford (The Artery Foundation)
- Art direction and layout by Mike Milford & Attila
- Photo by Adam Elmakias and Jared Burnett

== In popular culture ==
- "Hate Me" is featured in the 2016 film Hell or High Water.
