= Reign of Terror (Capture the Crown album) =

Studio album by Capture the Crown
- Released: 5 August 2014
- Recorded: 2013–2014
- Genres: Metalcore; nu metal
- Length: 29:32; 48:43 (deluxe edition)
- Label: Artery
- Producers: Matt Good, Taylor Larson, Cameron Pierce Mizell

Capture the Crown chronology
Live Life (EP) (2014)	Reign of Terror (2014)	Lost Control (2019)

Deluxe Edition

Singles from Reign of Terror
- 1. "Rebearth (featuring Telle Smith of The Word Alive)" Released: 20 May 2013; 2. "To Whom It May Concern" Released: 9 June 2014; 3. "I Hate You" Released: 1 July 2014; 4. "Make War, Not Love (featuring Alex Koehler)" Released: 24 July 2014

Professional ratings
Review scores
Source	Rating
AllMusic	3.5/5 stars
Revolver	3/5 stars
Rock Sound	6/10 stars

Reign of Terror is the second album by Australian metalcore band Capture The Crown. This is the final album the band released with the name Capture the Crown before they changed their name to just Capture. The album was produced by both Matt Good and Taylor Larson from the band From First to Last, and was released through the record label Artery Recordings. The first single off the album, "To Whom It May Concern", was released on 9 June 2014. It is the last album to feature guitarists Kris Sheehan, Jye Menzies, and drummer, Tyler March, after their departures on 4 October 2014, as well as the first album to feature bassist Maurice Morfaw. Reign of Terror was re-released as a deluxe edition with the five tracks from the "Live Life" EP on 24 November. Reign of Terror charted at No. 86 on the U.S. Billboard 200, the band's first album to chart in the U.S., as well as the third Australian metal band to chart.

== Track listing ==
No.	Title	Length
1.	"Reign of Terror"	1:24
2.	"Red Light District"	3:05
3.	"Smirk"	3:03
4.	"To Whom It May Concern"	2:58
5.	"I Hate You"	2:37
6.	"Oxy Sunrise"	3:14
7.	"Beating the Blade" (featuring Cheyne Truitt)	3:16
8.	"Firestarter"	3:03
9.	"Make War, Not Love" (featuring Alex Koehler of Chelsea Grin)	3:38
10.	"Janina"	3:10
Total length:		29:32

Deluxe Edition: Live Life EP
No.	Title	Length
11.	"Live Life"	3:57
12.	"Rebearth" (featuring Tyler Smith of The Word Alive)	3:52
13.	"Bloodsuckers"	3:41
14.	"All Hype All Night"	4:16
15.	"When I Get Home"	3:29
Total length:		48:43

== Personnel ==
Credits by AllMusic

Capture the Crown

- Jeffrey Wellfare - lead vocals
- Jye Menzies - lead guitar
- Kris Sheehan - rhythm guitar
- Mckenzie Torres - drums
- Maurice Morfaw - bass

Additional Personnel

- Cheyne Truitt - guest vocals on "Beating the Blade"
- Alex Koehler (ex-Chelsea Grin) - guest vocals on "Make War, Not Love"
- Tyler "Telle" Smith (The Word Alive) - guest vocals on "Rebearth"

Production

- Taylor Larson - Producer, engineer, mastering, mixing, writing
- Matt Good - Additional Production, programming, writing
- Shawn Christmas - Programming
- Mike Milford - A&R, Artwork, Design, Layout
- Sam Shepard - Artwork, Design, Layout
- Ernie Slenkovich - Engineer, percussion, writing
- Cameron Pierce Mizell - Production on "Live Life", "Rebearth", "Bloodsuckers", "All Hype All Night", and "When I Get Home"
