= Attila (metalcore band) =

American metalcore band

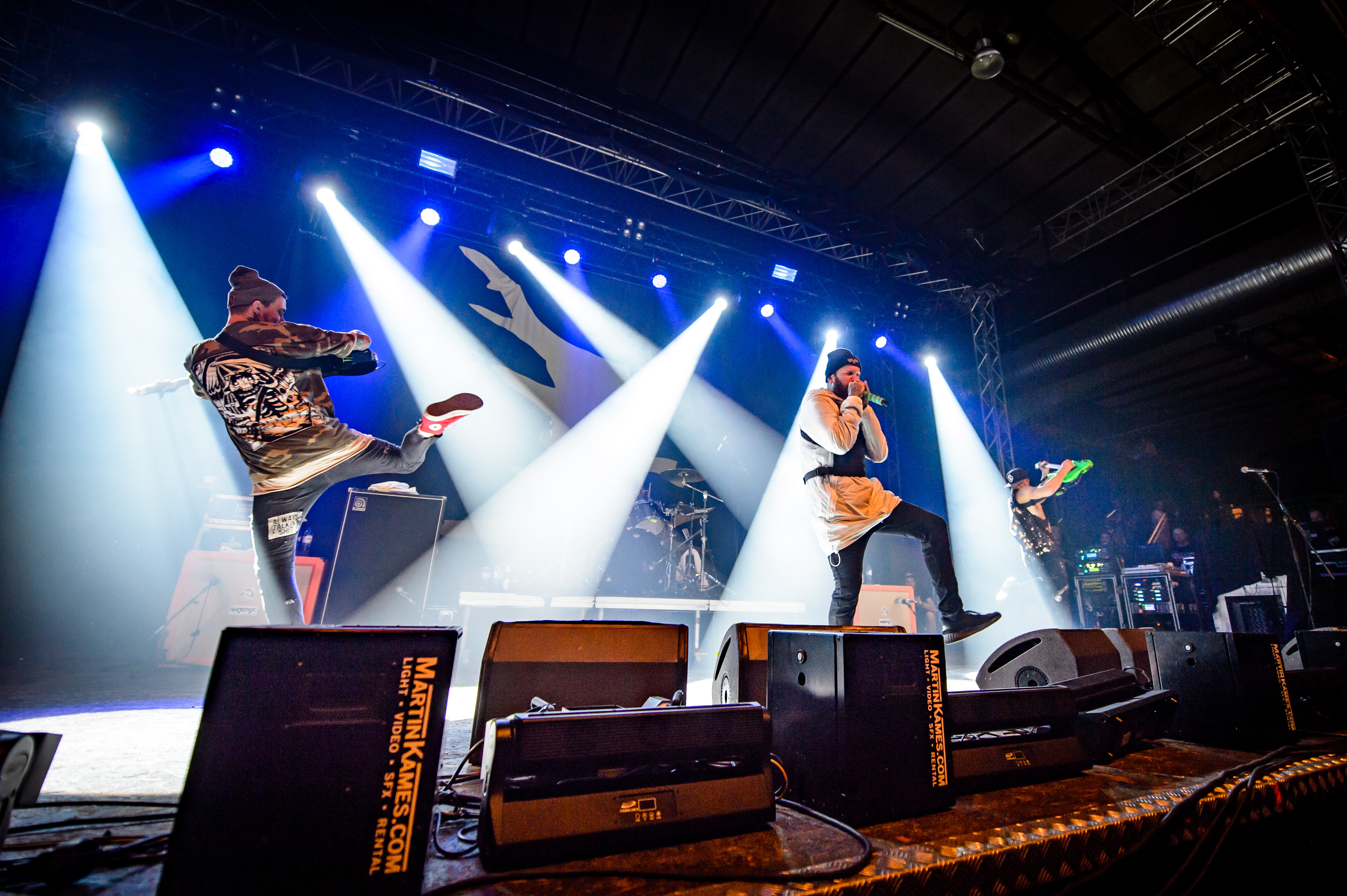
- Attila performing live in 2018

Background information
- Origin: Atlanta, Georgia, U.S.
- Genres: Metalcore; deathcore; rap metal; nu metal
- Years active: 2005–present
- Labels: Artery; SharpTone
- Members: Chris Fronzak; Chris Linck; Kalan Blehm; Tyler Kruckmeyer
- Past members: Matt Booth; Kris Wilson; Sam Halcomb; Paul Ollinger; Nate Salameh; Chris Comrie; Sean Heenan; Bryan McClure
- Website: attilaband.com

Attila is an American metalcore band from Atlanta, Georgia, founded in 2005. Known for their rap and nu metal influences, they have released nine full-length albums since their inception, with a tenth album to be released in 2026.

Though their original formation was in 2005, the band did not start touring full-time until around 2010. Their most successful album, About That Life, was produced by Joey Sturgis, released in June 2013, and debuted on the Billboard 200 chart at number 22. Attila has toured across the United States with bands such as Hed PE, Arsonists Get All the Girls, See You Next Tuesday, Insane Clown Posse, Emmure, Chelsea Grin, The Agonist, Oceano, Falling in Reverse, and Metro Station.

== History ==
=== Formation, early releases, and Rage (2005–2011) ===
Chris "Fronz" Fronzak, Sean Heenan, Sam Halcomb, Matt Booth and Kris Wilson formed Attila in their hometown of Atlanta in 2005, meeting each other at their high school and through mutual friends. Frontman Fronzak named the band in reference to Attila the Hun, which he came across in a book. Soon after forming, the band became the fourth imprint on the Artery Foundation/Razor & Tie joint venture, Artery Recordings.

Attila self-released their demo album Fallacy (and not with Statik Factory, contrary to popular belief) on March 30, 2007, and then released their debut album, Soundtrack to a Party in 2008 with Statik Factory, prior signing to Artery Recordings. In their early years Attila toured with Arsonists Get All The Girls, See You Next Tuesday, Chelsea Grin, American Me, and We Are The End. Attila toured with HED PE and Threat Signal from March 3 to April 10.

Attila signed to Artery Recordings in 2010 and released their second album and major label debut, called Rage, on May 11, 2010. The band recorded, produced, mixed, and mastered Rage with Interlace Audio's Stephan Hawkes in Portland, Oregon. Attila released their music video for the album's title track "Rage" on October 8, 2010. On May 13, 2010, the band was announced as support for Drop Dead, Gorgeous' headlining tour, "The Pyknic pArtery Tour", along with From First to Last, Sleeping With Sirens, Abandon All Ships, Woe, Is Me, For All Those Sleeping and Scarlett O'Hara, beginning on July 17 in Texas and ending in Los Angeles on August 20.

On August 19, 2010, the band was announced as support for Stick to Your Guns' North American tour with fellow supporting acts As Blood Runs Black, For the Fallen Dreams and Close Your Eyes beginning on October 1 in Arizona and ending on the 31st in California.

On September 28, 2010, the band was announced as support for Oceano's "Contagion Across the Nation Tour" with fellow supporting acts Chelsea Grin, In the Midst of Lions and Monsters beginning on November 5 in Michigan and ending on the 27th in Illinois.

On May 6, 2011, the band was announced as part of the 2011 "All Stars Tour" along with Emmure, Alesana, Iwrestledabearonce, blessthefall, For Today, In This Moment, Born of Osiris, The Ghost Inside, After the Burial, For All Those Sleeping, Memphis May Fire, Motionless in White, Chelsea Grin and Sleeping with Sirens.

=== Outlawed (2011–2012) ===
On July 14, 2011, the band announced that their next album, Outlawed, was set for an August 16 release through Artery Recordings and Razor & Tie. On July 25, 2011, the band revealed the track listing for Outlawed and released the first single from the album, "Payback", for streaming. On August 4, the band released the second single "Smokeout", followed by a music video for "Smokeout" on August 17.

On August 8, 2011, the band was announced as part of the lineup for Alesana and Dance Gavin Dance's "Rock Yourself to Sleep" headlining tour with fellow supporting acts A Skylit Drive, I Set My Friends on Fire and A Loss for Words. On August 31, 2011, the band was announced as support for the "Monster Energy Outbreak Tour 2012" being headlined by Asking Alexandria, and including fellow supporting acts As I Lay Dying, Suicide Silence and Memphis May Fire.

On September 18, 2011, the band was announced as support for We Came as Romans' "Take a Picture, It Will Last Longer" tour beginning on November 22 and finishing on December 9, with fellow supporting acts Falling in Reverse, Sleeping with Sirens and For All I Am.

On December 12, 2011, the band was announced as part of the lineup for the New England Metal and Hardcore fest 2012 taking place on April 20–22 at the Palladium in Worcester, Massachusetts. On December 22, 2011, the band was announced as part of Chelsea Grin's six-week tour, the "Sick Tour", along with fellow supporting acts For the Fallen Dreams, Chunk! No, Captain Chunk!, Vanna, Volumes and The Crimson Armada.

On March 24, 2012, the band's vocalist, Fronzak, was denied entry for the second time into Canada because of a felony on his record. Fronzak released a statement concerning the incident, saying he could apply for reconsideration in two years.

On June 6, 2012, the band announced that bassist, Chris Comrie had parted ways with the band. The band released a statement, describing the departure as a personal choice made by Comrie and that they were still on good terms. On September 8, 2012, the band announced that they acquired former For the Fallen Dreams' guitarist Kalan Blehm as their new bassist.

On September 13, 2012, the band announced their "Party With the Devil" headlining tour with supporting acts Make Me Famous, Issues, Ice Nine Kills, and Adestria, beginning on October 26 in Florida and ending on November 15 in Washington.

=== About That Life and side projects (2013–2014) ===
On January 4, 2013, Attila was announced to play at the Warped Tour 2013 from June 16 to July 11, 2013.

On February 3, 2013, it was announced that the band had finished writing their follow-up to Outlawed and had entered the studio. The band stated that the album would be the "heaviest" and "craziest" album they had ever made. On February 25, 2013, the band uploaded their own "Harlem Shake" video.

On April 20, 2013, Attila released the first single from the album, "Middle Fingers Up", and revealed that the new album, titled About That Life, would be released on June 25, 2013. On May 24, 2013, Attila teamed up with Spotify and Revolver and released the title track from the record, "About That Life".

On August 1, 2013, the band announced the "About That Life" headlining tour with supporting acts Upon a Burning Body, The Plot in You and Fit for a King. On December 11, 2013, it was announced that frontman, Chris Fronzak would be heading into the studio the next month to begin recording his forthcoming hip hop album. Later that night on Fuse's Warped Roadies it was announced that Attila would be playing Warped Tour 2014, with fellow announcements Tear Out the Heart, Mayday Parade, the Protomen and Plague Vendor.

On December 13, 2013, the band announced "The New King's Tour" with supporting acts I See Stars, Capture the Crown, Ice Nine Kills, Myka, Relocate, and Artisans, beginning on January 31, 2014. On December 18, 2013, the band was announced as support for A Day to Remember's "Self Help Festival" on March 22, 2014, in San Bernardino, California.

On July 22, 2014, the band introduced Machine Gun Kelly at the APMAs where he performed the song "See My Tears" with the Cleveland Contemporary Youth Orchestra.

On August 18, 2014, the band was announced to headline the Monster Outbreak Tour 2014 with supporting acts Crown the Empire, Like Moths to Flames and Sworn In. The tour was scheduled to kick off on November 14 in Fort Lauderdale and end on December 14 in Massachusetts. On September 5, they were announced as support for Black Veil Brides' UK tour with fellow supporting act Fearless Vampire Killers, beginning on October 3 in Cardiff, UK and ending on October 17 in Leeds, UK.

In 2016, Attila was scheduled to join Hollywood Undead on their Europe tour.

=== Guilty Pleasure and departure of Nate Salameh (2014–2016) ===
On October 6, 2014, the band unveiled their new album, Guilty Pleasure, which was to be released on November 24. Fronzak described the album as the heaviest they had written. On October 20, 2014, the band released the first single from the album, "Proving Grounds".

On October 22, Alternative Press reported that guitarist Nate Salameh had left the band. When asked about the decision, Salameh said that he wanted to focus on living a drug and alcohol-free life.

On November 8, 2014, the band released the album's second single, "Horsepig", with Fronzak stating that it was "one of my favorite songs I've ever written lyrically." The band played a 26-date tour in support of the album, "The Guilty Pleasure Tour", which kicked off in Lauderdale, Florida on November 11 and ended on December 14 in Boston, Massachusetts.

Attila played the entirety of the 2015 Vans Warped Tour on the main stage.

Burying the proverbial hatchet with Falling in Reverse frontman Ronnie Radke, Fronzak and the rest of Attila announced a co-headlining tour with Falling in Reverse called the Supervillains Tour with support from Metro Station and Assuming We Survive. The tour was played at the tail end of 2015.

Attila did a European tour with Hollywood Undead, starting in March 2016.

=== Signing to SharpTone Records, Chaos, and Villain (2016–2021) ===
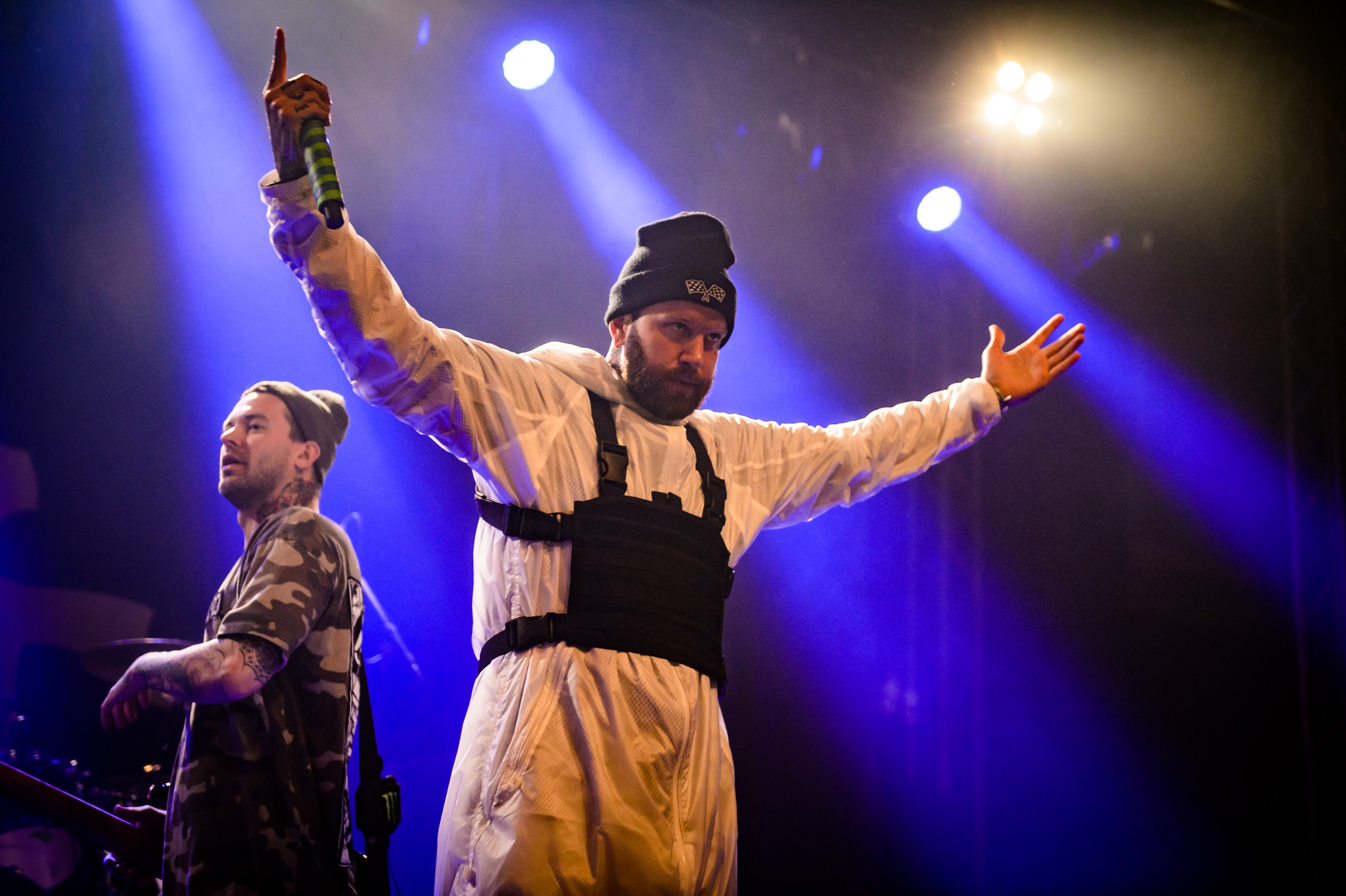
Attila performing in Germany in 2018

On June 24, 2016, Attila announced that they had signed to SharpTone Records, a new label co-founded by Nuclear Blast CEO Markus Staiger and Shawn Keith. "We are REALLY excited to announce that we have officially signed to SharpTone!" shared Attila frontman Fronzak. "We are at an amazing point in our career and we know that these guys have the power that we need to take things to the next level."

Chaos was released on November 4, 2016.

On January 1, 2017, Sean Heenan announced that he was leaving the band. The band later issued a statement of their own regarding his departure, citing that the reasons revolved around feeling like it was "time to make a change to improve our rhythm section."

On February 13, 2018, Attila announced that they are an unsigned band after their year run with SharpTone Records.

On February 22, 2019, Attila released an album titled Villain.

On May 29, 2020, Attila released a new song titled "Cancelled".

The next month, drummer Bryan McClure was fired from the band following several rape and sexual misconduct allegations.

=== Closure and singles (2021) ===
On March 18, 2021, Attila released a song titled "Clarity" as the lead single from their upcoming ninth studio album Closure.

On April 14, 2021, Attila released a song titled "Day Drinking" as a single.

On April 30, 2021, Attila released a song titled "Metalcore Manson", which was later featured on the album Closure.

On July 22, 2021, Attila released their ninth studio album Closure.

On September 12, 2021, Attila performed at Inkcarceration Music and Tattoo Festival, alongside numerous other bands including Wage War, The Devil Wears Prada, and Beartooth.

On September 27, 2021, Attila began The Day Drinking Tour, named after a single they had released earlier in the year. The tour featured Dead Crown and Jynx, beginning in Atlanta, Georgia on September 27 and ended on December 31 in Houston, Texas.

=== EPs, features, and Concrete Throne (2022–present) ===
On January 12, 2022, Attila announced the return of Ragefest, featuring the bands Islander, Crown Magnetar, and He Is Legend. The tour began in Jacksonville, Florida on March 17 and ended in Springfield, Montana on April 17.

On August 13, 2022, Attila performed at Michigan Metal Fest as the only headliner.

Between 2022 and 2023, lead singer Chris "Fronz" Fronzak had teased that he would be part of a deathcore group named The Big Six featuring members from popular band including lead singers such as Will Ramos, Dickie Allen, and Tyler Shelton. Nearly two weeks after the groups EP announcement, Fronzak dropped the gig due to wanting to focus on other pursuits. The group is now known as Project: Vengeance.

On January 21, 2023, Attila performed at the ShipRocked Pre-Cruise Rally at Cocoa Riverfront Park in Cocoa, Florida alongside the bands Steel Panther and Afterlife.

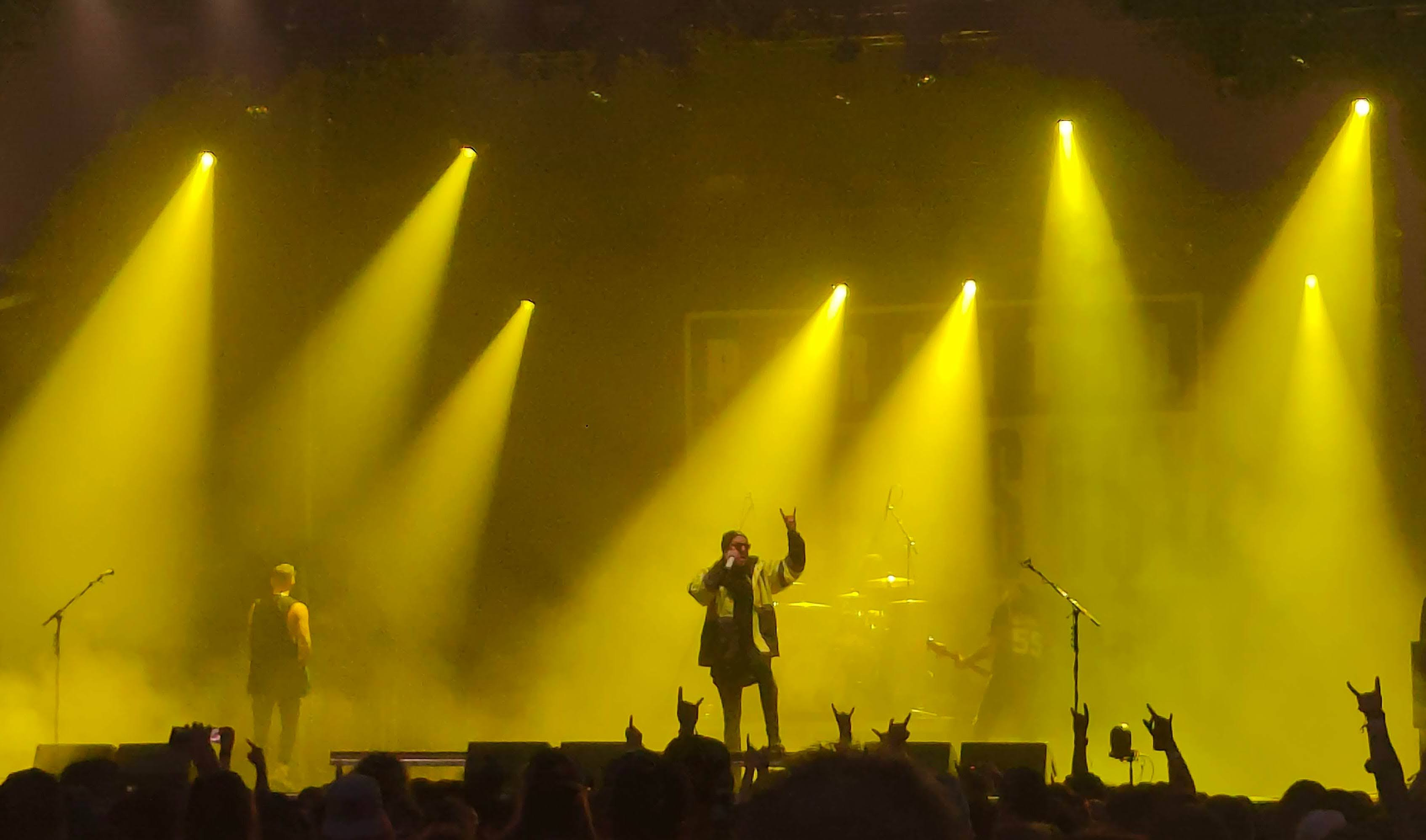
Attila performing at Aftershock 2023

On January 27, 2023, Attila announced that they released official merchandise through the popular chain store Hot Topic, which introduced two brand new shirt designs and one throwback shirt design.

Nearly two years after the release of "Day Drinking" – on February 24, 2023, Attila released a new song titled "Handshakes With Snakes" as a single. The same day, they started the European leg of their "About That Life" 10 Year Anniversary tour, which began in Arnhem, NL Willemeen on February 24.

Two months later, Attila released their first song to feature clean vocals by lead singer Chris "Fronz" Fronzak on April 27, 2023, titled "Bite Your Tongue" as a single.

On July 7, 2023, Attila released a new song featuring Ekoh titled "Mia Goth", named after the popular horror movie actress. This song was released as a single. This song was later released a few months later with their new EP titled Fu4ever.

On March 3, 2024, Attila began The Angels & Villains EU/UK Tour in Saarbrücken, Germany, and ended May 26 in Pontiac, Michigan.

On May 23, 2024, Attila released a new song titled "New Devil" featuring Dickie Allen, the lead singer of Infant Annihilator and Nekrogoblikon.

On June 21, 2024, Chris "Fronz" Fronzak was featured in a new song by Brokencyde titled "Crunk God". The song was released as a single. The whole band was featured in a new song by Dead Rabbitts, along with Escape the Fate titled "Oxygen". The song was released as a single.

In late 2024, Attila featured on Aurorawave's track titled "Kindness".

Attila played at Reload Festival on August 14–16, 2025 in Sulingen, Germany.

In October 2025, the band announced their tenth studio album, Concrete Throne; originally set for release on April 8, 2026, it was released early on March 20.

== Musical style and lyrics ==
Attila's musical style has been categorized as metalcore, deathcore, nu metalcore, rap metal, nu metal, and death metal. Additionally, AllMusic referred to them as "party death metal," Loudwire called them "party deathcore", and Alternative Press referred to them simply as "party metal". The band has been known to incorporate gang vocals that have drawn comparisons to Hatebreed. The band's instrumentation incorporates rapping, breakdowns and heavy guitar Riffs. AllMusic described it as "fast and furious thrashing."

The band's lyrical content has been controversial, and is noted for its profanity, frequently using words such as "faggot", "cunt", and "bitch". Metal Hammer said the band's lyrics were "offensive" and "beyond ridiculous". The band's lyrics have been known to make references to oral sex, breasts, giving the finger, methamphetamine, robbery, and car chases. The band has also referenced several musical artists and other celebrities in their lyrics, including Tim Lambesis, Danny Worsnop, Emmure, Tom Brady, Harvey Weinstein, and Martin Shkreli. Loudwire said: "As you can tell [...] Attila's goal is not to save the world." AllMusic said: "Rather than take themselves seriously [...] Attila take a lighthearted, laid-back, party-animal approach." Lead singer Chris Fronzak stated that the band's lyrics are solely intended for entertainment. He said in 2013: "All we want is for the listener to have a fun experience, and that is the main message behind our music." Alternative Press reported that in response to the opinion of some that the band was a "poor influence on [the] scene", Fronzak asserted in a 2015 Facebook post that he had in fact written deeply personal and "meaningful" songs in the band, but they had been ignored. He wrote: "Why do you not know this? Because you've probably only listened to our 'popular songs'. I'm not trying to call you out, but I've written some pretty deep shit that nobody knows about because people are so quick to overlook those songs."

== Band members ==
Current

- Chris "Fronz" Fronzak – lead vocals (2005–present)
- Chris Linck – lead guitar (2008–present), backing vocals (2016–present), rhythm guitar (2014–2021)
- Kalan "Kal" Blehm – bass, backing vocals (2012–present)
- Tyler Kruckmeyer – drums (2021–present)

Former

- Sean Heenan – drums (2005–2017)
- Matt Booth – lead guitar (2005–2008)
- Kris Wilson – rhythm guitar (2005–2007)
- Sam Halcomb – bass (2005–2008)
- Nader "Nate" Salameh – rhythm guitar (2008–2014)
- Paul Ollinger – bass (2008–2010)
- Chris Comrie – bass, backing vocals (2010–2012)
- Bryan McClure – drums (2017–2020)

Timeline

== Side projects ==
In September 2014, Blehm announced his instrumental side project, Frozen Forest, and released "Blue Eyes", the third song following the releases of "Dreamer" and "Work".

In December 2020, a project called Emerald Royce was announced that involves Chris Linck and former Issues and Woe, Is Me frontman Tyler Carter.

== Discography ==
Studio albums

- Fallacy (2007)
- Soundtrack to a Party (2008)
- Rage (2010)
- Outlawed (2011)
- About That Life (2013)
- Guilty Pleasure (2014)
- Chaos (2016)
- Villain (2019)
- Closure (2021)
- Concrete Throne (2026)

EPs

- Party with the Devil (2012)
- Three 6 (2017)
- Callout 2 (2018)
- Blackout (2018)
- Still About It (2018)
- Pizza (2018)
- Cancelled (2020)
- Clarity (2021)
- Metalcore Manson (2021)
- Day Drinking (2021)
- Handshakes with Snakes (2023)
- Bite Your Tongue (2023)
- Mia Goth feat. Ekoh (2023)
- FU4EVR (2023)
- Timebomb (2024)
- New Devil feat. Dickie Allen (2024)
- Dog Pack feat. Sn8ke (2024)
- Wasteland feat. DED (2024)
- Americas Rejects (2024)
