= About That Life =

Studio album by Attila
- Released: June 25, 2013
- Studio: The Foundation Estate, 37 Studios
- Genre: Nu metal; deathcore; rap rock
- Length: 37:36
- Label: Artery
- Producer: Joey Sturgis

Attila chronology
Outlawed (2011)	About That Life (2013)	Guilty Pleasure (2014)

Singles from About That Life
- 1. "Party with the Devil" Released: October 30, 2012; 2. "About That Life" Released: June 25, 2013; 3. "Shots for the Boys" Released: November 13, 2013

About That Life is the fifth studio album by American metalcore band Attila. The album was originally released on June 25, 2013, through Artery Recordings. It is the band's third release on the label.

The album is the second by the band to be produced by Joey Sturgis, who has previously worked with such bands as The Devil Wears Prada, Emmure, We Came as Romans and Asking Alexandria.

== Reception ==
=== Critical response ===
The album has been met with mostly indifferent reviews. Critics panned the CD on a number of fronts, from the musicianship, production, and lyrical content.

MetalSucks says "Totally obsessed with superficial bullshit, Chris 'Fronz' Fronzak seemingly can't help but leave a trail of douche slime everywhere he goes."

AllMusic states that "About That Life, from Southern-fried party-metalcore outfit Attila, sounds a little like Hinder, G.B.H., and Disturbed gave birth to a stillborn child and then had Fred Durst reanimate it."

Metal Injection says that one of the songs off of the album is "the worst thing I've ever heard. Clearly, the guy who wrote these lyrics must have attention deficit disorder."

Decibel writes that "Attila are one of those party douchebag bands who add dance beats, homophobia, misogyny, and rapping skills whiter than newly fallen snow to down-tuned junk metal, and guys to perform inane, generic, sterile chugcore just so the singer can get his rocks off on weird fantasies where he's a badass bitch-fucker."

Alternative Press says "Some bands are so breathtakingly stupid they tumble forward into a kind of genius."

The Westboro Baptist Church has scheduled a protest against the band in response to the song "Callout," whose lyrics include "Hey, Westboro Baptist, fuck you too. Come and protest this dick, faggots." The WBC Fliers Twitter account tweeted "Due to special invitation from @FRONZ1LLA, Westboro Baptist Church to picket deathcore band @ATTILAga in Bonner Springs, KS @CWAKC on 7/23."

Despite the harsh reviews, Artistdirect reviewer Rick Florino says About That Life "is a fucking blast. It's [a] beer-cracking, skull-snapping, and ass-shaking good time from Atlanta's wildest crew."

=== Commercial performance ===
About That Life had the highest number of first week sales of any Attila album up until that point, with 14,271 albums sold. It debuted at number 22 on the Billboard 200, number 5 on Billboard's Independent Albums chart, number 4 on the Hard Rock Albums chart, and number 5 on the Rock Albums chart.

== Track listing ==
No.	Title	Length
1.	"Middle Fingers Up"	2:37
2.	"Hellraiser"	2:56
3.	"Rageaholics"	3:00
4.	"Backtalk"	3:04
5.	"Leave a Message"	0:47
6.	"About That Life"	3:06
7.	"Thug Life"	2:47
8.	"Break Shit"	2:59
9.	"Gimmicks & Lie$"	1:09
10.	"Callout"	2:29
11.	"Unforgivable"	3:22
12.	"Shots for the Boys"	2:41
13.	"Party with the Devil" (Re-Recorded)	3:19
14.	"The New Kings"	3:20
Total length:		37:36

== Personnel ==
Members

- Chris "Fronz" Fronzak – lead vocals
- Chris Linck – lead guitar
- Nate Salameh – rhythm guitar
- Sean Heenan – drums
- Kalan Blehm – bass, additional screamed vocals on "Hellraiser", "About That Life", and "Thug Life"

Additional personnel

- Mike Milford – spoken word on "Leave a Message"

Production

- Produced and vocal editing by Joey Sturgis, at The Foundation Estate
- Engineered by Nick Scott and Joey Sturgis
- Drums recorded at 37 Studios
- Drum editing by Jeff Dunne
- Mixed and mastered by Joey Sturgis
- Edited by Nick Scott
- Programming and sound design by Joey Sturgis and Logan Mader (2, 6, 10)
- A&R, management and layout by Mike Milford (The Artery Foundation)
- Publicity by Kerri Brusca
- Booking by Matt Andersen (USA, The Pantheon Agency) and Nanouk De Meijere (EU, Avocado Booking)
