= Skeletons (Sirens and Sailors album) =

Studio album by Sirens and Sailors
- Released: October 29, 2013
- Recorded: 2013; Atrium Audio studio, Lancaster, PA
- Genre: Metalcore
- Length: 45:01
- Labels: Artery, Razor & Tie
- Producers: Sirens and Sailors

Sirens and Sailors chronology
Skeletons (2013)	Rising Moon: Setting Sun (2015)

Singles from Skeletons
- 1. "Go for the Throat" Released: July 9, 2013; 2. "Straightjacket" Released: September 13, 2013; 3. "Born & Raised (Flower City)" Released: October 11, 2013

Skeletons is the second studio album by American metalcore band Sirens and Sailors. The album was released on October 29, 2013 through Artery Recordings and Razor & Tie.

== Track listing ==
No.	Title	Length
1.	"Inception"	1:10
2.	"The Chosen One"	3:49
3.	"Go for the Throat"	3:58
4.	"Straightjacket"	4:19
5.	"Exorcist"	4:03
6.	"Not That Easy"	4:45
7.	"Reflection"	2:25
8.	"Born & Raised (Flower City)"	3:51
9.	"Calm Before the Storm"	3:46
10.	"Weight of the World"	4:20
11.	"Holdfast"	3:55
12.	"Skeletons"	4:20
Total length:		45:01

== Personnel ==
Credits by AllMusic

Sirens and Sailors

- Kyle Bihrle – lead vocals
- Jimm Lindsley – lead guitar
- Todd Golder – rhythm guitar, clean vocals
- Steven Goupil – bass
- Doug Court – drums

Production

- Sirens and Sailors – Producer
- Grant McFarland – Engineer, mixing, cello
- Carson Slovak – Engineer, mixing
- Troy Glessner – Mastering
- Taylor Brandt – Violin
- Cory Hadje – Management
- Ben Leubitz – Management
- Mike Milford – A&R
- Josiah Moore – Art Direction, design
