= Dealer (band) =

Australian band

- Origin: Melbourne, Australia
- Genres: Nu metalcore, metalcore
- Years active: 2018–2020, 2023–present
- Labels: Human Warfare, Stay Sick
- Members: Aidan Ellaz Holmes; Matthew Brida; Brad Lipsett; Jack Leggett
- Past members: Alex Milovic; David Wilder; Josh Ang; Martin Wood; Gabor Toth; Seth Murrant; Joe Abikhair; Maurice Morfaw; Jake Rakose; Jacob Rentoule; Ryan Delfos
- Website: www.thedealersound.com

Dealer is an Australian nu metalcore group that was formed in 2018 formed by Aidan Ellaz. The group is composed of vocalist Aidan Ellaz-Holmes, drummer Brad Lipsett, guitarist Jack Leggett and bassist and vocalist Matthew Brida.

== History ==
Following Aidan Holmes' ejection from Alpha Wolf citing multiple sexual offences, he met with former Northlane member Alex Milovic, Capture drummer Joe Abikhair, Codeine King guitarist Josh Ang, and Iconoclast member David Wilder to form a new band. On 5 April 2019, they released their debut EP Soul Burn. Soul Burn being well received along with the announcement of being signed to fellow metal figure Stay Sick Records (now known as Modern Empire Music).

On 22 July 2019, Wilder, Ang, and, Milovic left the band citing Aidan's rumoured sexual misconduct for their departure. Wilder citing irreconcilable differences between him and the remaining members, Ang citing abuse, and Milovic citing regret after being called out by former bandmate Josh Smith resulting in a shift away from touring to focus on the managerial side of the band. They were replaced by former Capture bassist Maurice Morfaw, and The Gloom in the Corner guitarist Martin Wood. On 14 February 2020, the band released their second EP Saint. Following the release of Saint, they were joined by Harmed guitarist and Codeine King bassist Gabor Toth

On 22 June 2020, four of the band's five members left the band. At the time, Lambgoat reported "former guitarist Josh Ang issued a statement via Instagram in which he speaks of emotional abuse suffered at hands of Aidan Ellaz,". Aidan Ellaz settled out of court for allegation of sexual misconduct and sexual violence.

On 8 January 2023, an anonymous Instagram account leaked that the band has returned and will be releasing a new single "Show Me The Body" on January 13, 2023. Three previous members returned; Joe Abikhair, Aidan Ellaz Holmes, and Maurice Morfaw; with two new members; Seth Murrant and Jake Rakose.

On 31 January 2024, the band's instagram account posted a cryptic video hinting at a return. The band then released a new single "Red Teeth" on 1 February 2024 and announced the upcoming album "New Order of Mind" set to be released on 10 May 2024. The band once again changed their lineup with this announcement, with Murrant stepping back to focus on his solo project “Nyu” and the others joining the outfit DESTROY, REBUILD UNTIL GOD SHOWS (D.R.U.G.S) on their tour across the US. Rakose left the band for unknown reasons.

The band initially released two singles, "Red Teeth", and "Glass Preacher" with a lineup consisting of guitarist Jacob Rentoule (formerly Diesect), Ryan Delfos, and Brad Lipsett (formerly Kings At Heart). However, as of the release of the third single "The Hate You Try to Hide", the band's line up has since been updated with Rentoule and Delfos no longer being associated with the band, Delfos due to a hand injury and Rentoule founding the band Pray4me. Their replacements compose of Matthew Brida, the band's videographer, on bass, and additional vocals, and Jack Leggett (formerly HEAVENSGATE) on guitar.

Following the release of their album "New Order of Mind" on May 10, 2024 (the same day as Knocked Loose's "You Won't Go Before You're Supposed To," which Ellaz defended on social media), it was announced the band would embark on a tour in the United States with headliner Attila on "The American Rejects Tour" alongside Oceano and Nathan James, though Oceano dropped out of the tour due to Ellaz's aforementioned allegations along with controversy towards Attila vocalist Chris Fronzak.

Dealer completely wiped their Instagram account around the start of 2025 (a common tactic to drum up excitement and create hype), adding a post captioned "DEALER® 2025." The band did successfully tour during the year, as part of the aforementioned "The American Rejects Tour" in early spring. Following that, the band once again attempted a return with an announcement for a show at Mo's Desert Clubhouse, being cancelled mere hours after its announcement, reportedly due to the past allegations against Aidan Ellaz-Holmes. It would have been their first Australian show in five years.

In November 2025, the band began teasing new music, and on December 2, 2025, the track "Trigger Discipline" came out, and was referred to as "Track 1" and was said to be "The opening tremor of something more," as per the band's social media.

== Members ==
Current members

- Aidan Ellaz Holmes – lead vocals (2018–2020, 2023–present)
- Jack Leggett – guitars (2024–present)
- Matthew Brida – bass, vocals (2024–present)
- Brad Lipsett – drums (2024–present)

Touring members

- Peter Colver – bass (2019–2020)
- Chad Chen – guitars (2025–present)

Former members

- Alex Milovic – bass (2018–2019)
- Josh Ang (Pincer+, HEAVENSGATE) – guitars (2018–2019)
- David Wilder (HEAVENSGATE) – guitars (2018–2019)
- Martin Wood (Bad/Love (AUS)) – guitars, bass (2019–2020)
- Gabor Toth (Harmed) – bass (2020)
- Joe Abikhair – drums (2018–2020, 2023–2024)
- Seth Murrant – guitars (2023–2024)
- Jake Rakose – guitars (2023–2024)
- Maurice Morfaw – guitars (2019–2020), bass (2019–2020, 2023–2024)
- Jacob Rentoule – guitars (2024)
- Ryan Delfos – bass (2024)

Timeline

== Discography ==
=== Albums ===
- New Order Of Mind (2024)

=== Extended plays ===
- Soul Burn (2019; produced by Lance Prenc)
- Saint (2020; produced by Lance Prenc)
- Taboo (2026; produced by Dealer)

=== Singles ===
- Crooked (2019)
- Grotesque (2019)
- Pretty Stupid (2019)
- Tourniquet (2020)
- Show Me The Body (2023)
- Red Teeth (2024)
- Glass Preacher (2024)
- The Hate You Try to Hide (2024)
- Hyperreal Death Scene (2024)
- Trigger Discipline (2025)
- Pump Action Catatonia (2026)
- Starved of the Pressure (2026)
- Dead Dogs Don't Bark (2026)
