= Outlawed (album) =

Studio album by Attila
- Released: August 16, 2011
- Recorded: April 14 – May 14, 2011
- Studios: The Foundation Recording Studios, Connersville, Indiana
- Genres: Metalcore; deathcore
- Length: 29:40
- Label: Artery
- Producer: Joey Sturgis

Attila chronology
Rage (2010)	Outlawed (2011)	About That Life (2013)

Singles from Outlawed
- 1. "Payback" Released: 2011; 2. "Smokeout" Released: 2011; 3. "Another Round" Released: 2012

Outlawed is the fourth studio album by American metalcore band Attila. The album was released on August 16, 2011, through Artery Recordings. It is the band's second release on the label. Upon its release it charted the Billboard 200 at number 87, selling 4,700 units in its first week.

The album is the first by the band to be produced by Joey Sturgis, who has previously worked with such bands as The Devil Wears Prada, We Came as Romans, Asking Alexandria and Miss May I.

== Track listing ==
No.	Title	Length
1.	"Outlawed"	2:01
2.	"Light Me Up"	3:03
3.	"Nothing Left to Say"	3:02
4.	"Another Round"	2:38
5.	"Nasty Mouth"	3:28
6.	"Smokeout"	2:41
7.	"Holler at Ya Boy"	3:25
8.	"Sex, Drugs & Violence"	2:49
9.	"White Lightning"	2:59
10.	"Payback"	3:34
Total length:		29:40

== Personnel ==
Attila

- Chris "Fronz" Fronzak– vocals
- Nate Salameh – rhythm guitar
- Chris Linck – lead guitar
- Chris Comrie – bass, backing vocals
- Sean Heenan – drums, percussion

Production

- Produced, Engineered, Mixed and mastered by Joey Sturgis
- A&R, management and layout by Mike Milford (The Artery Foundation)
- Booking by Matt Andersen (The Pantheon Agency)
