= Sirens and Sailors =

American metalcore band

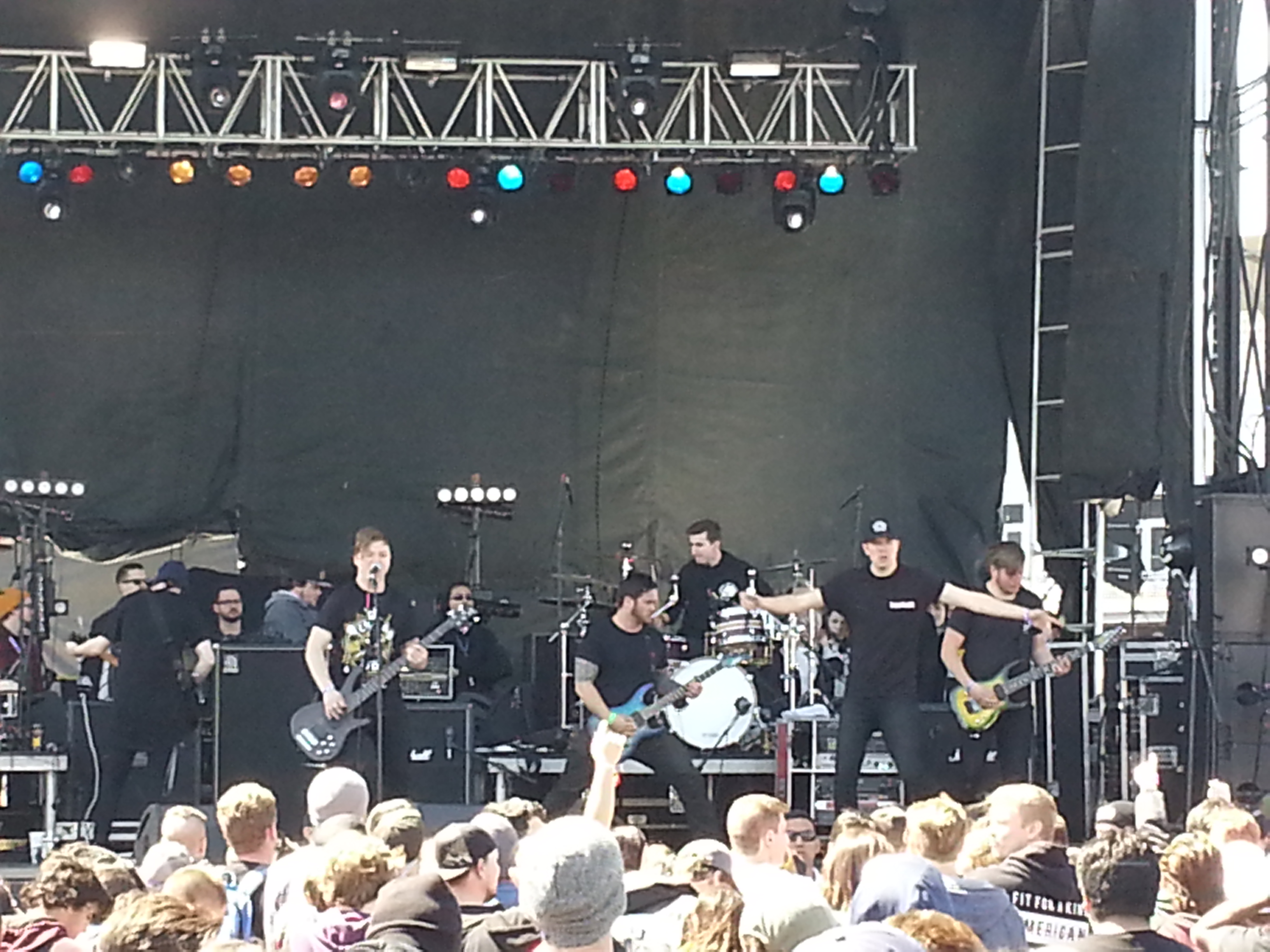
- Sirens and Sailors in 2016

Background information
- Origin: Rochester, New York, U.S.
- Genres: Metalcore, deathcore
- Years active: 2005–present
- Label: Victoire Coréo-Chinoise
- Members: Todd Golder; Steve Goupil; Doug Court; Jimm Lindsley; Kyle Bihrle
- Past members: Josh Deni; Kevin Mahle; Brian Woodruff; Jon Turner; Nick Lord

Sirens and Sailors is an American metalcore band from Rochester, New York, that formed in 2005. They released two EPs and three albums; their latest release was a single entitled "I'm Not Sorry", which was released in August 2019. The band was formerly represented by Tragic Hero Records during 2012 as reported by Alternative Press. Sirens and Sailors have shared the stage with numerous national acts including Hundredth, Stray from the Path, My Ticket Home, Escape the Fate, and Ice Nine Kills. Sirens and Sailors was previously managed by Cory Hajde of The Artery Foundation. The band was previously signed to Artery Recordings and Razor & Tie, but has been dropped from any label support.

== History ==
=== Formation and name origin (2005–2006) ===
Sirens and Sailors was formed in Rochester, New York in 2005. In part, the band was born out of the Rochester band Renouf. In the beginning Sirens and Sailors originally consisted of Josh Deni (the former drummer & recording production artist of the band Renouf) & Kevin Mahle (the former guitarist of the band 8PointBlank). Drummer Josh Deni first began one on one writing sessions with guitarist Kevin Mahle in early 2005 while he was bored waiting for one of Renouf's guitarist's, Jon Reed, to get back from a tour serving the band Psyopus as their roadie. Todd Golder (a former guitarist of the band Five Mile Line) joined in the song writing sessions about a month later. The three musicians all went to Churchville-Chili High School together and had played many shows with each other in the past. The trio (first internally dubbed as the "Todd, Josh, & Kevy Proj") were just having fun writing and recording music as a side project at the time. The music they were writing was different from their current projects and over time they all became close friends which brought the song writing sessions to a whole new level. They developed the core chemistry of what would someday be known as Sirens & Sailors. Around three months later, Kyle Bihrle (formally a guitarist and backup vocalist for the band Renouf) eventually got bored too and began to sit in on the writing sessions and just started writing lyrics in a notebook one day. Jon Turner (formally the bassist for the band Renouf) was asked if he'd be interested in coming on board about 6 months later—when the group of musicians finally decided to give up on their former music endeavors and turn this side project into a serious band looking to book shows to observe how their music would be perceived by the local scene.

For the first year or so the band was known by the name "The Sirens & The Sailors" (TS&TS) until the band [temporarily] signed to record label Sumerian Records. One of the labels representatives decided that the use of the word "the" in the name was unnecessary and a mouthful. As the band developed its core sound, they made many member changes to get to today's line-up. Jimm Lindsley (the former bassist of the band A Day Without Rain) replaced Kevin Mahle on guitar, and most recently Steven Goupil replaced Nick Lord and his predecessor, Jon Turner on bass guitar.

In an interview with Broken Records Magazine in November 2012, vocalist Kyle Bihrle explained the origin of the band name. "Our band name is derived from mythology. The story of the sirens luring in sailors to their death, is the ultimate story of deception. Our name is something anyone can relate to because at some point in our lives, we have all been led to believe that something is what it isn't in life." He also commented on the beginnings of Sirens and Sailors. "We started playing music because there is nothing like it. There is such a fulfilling, exciting rush you get when you get to play live for people. This is first and foremost our passion, whatever follows with it is just a bonus. We play music because we love to. Our "careers" as musicians are just getting started. Us, like many bands, have to put a lot of blood, sweat, and tears into our passion before we can even begin to think about making enough money to support ourselves, and families. It's just how it is, you have to earn your place."

=== Sirens & Sailors EP (2007–October 2010) ===
The band released their self-titled first EP, Sirens & Sailors in 2007, however it was not digitally released until January 31, 2010, via iTunes. It was recorded and edited independently by Josh Deni then mixed and mastered at Red Booth Recordings by Brian Moore. To support their first release, Sirens and Sailors continued to play in Rochester, New York, while expanding their reach regionally with several tours throughout the northeast.

=== Still Breathing (November 2010 – April 2012) ===
On November 13, 2010, Sirens and Sailors self released the EP Still Breathing; featuring twelve new songs and immediately available on iTunes. Noting the differences between the self-titled EP and "Still Breathing", vocalist Kyle Bihrle commented, "our original EP consists of the first 5 songs we ever wrote as a band, still young, still trying to find where we were wanting to go with our "sound" I suppose you could say. Our full length however, gives the listener a better idea of who we are becoming. Sure there is some variety in style from song to song, but we like it that way. No one wants to listen to the same song over and over again on a full-length record, it gets boring. Since our release of Still Breathing things have been extremely busy for us, we put that record out in hopes that people would start recognizing us for our music, and that is exactly what happened." Sirens and Sailors provided direct support to My Ticket Home at the Fans 4 Bands "Community Collisions Fest 2011" in Baltimore, Maryland; and also provided direct support to headliner, Though She Wrote on their final "The Chapters Tour" (August 2011) with additional support by From Atlantis. To open 2012, Sirens and Sailors provided support to headliner, Affiance on "The Warriors Tour" (January 2012) with additional support from Serianna and Us, From Outside. This tour covered the East Coast through the Midwest.

=== Wasteland EP and touring (May 2012 – June 2013) ===
Sirens and Sailors newest EP entitled Wasteland was released on May 29, 2012, via Tragic Hero Records. Wasteland EP includes six tracks produced by Drew Fulk [At The Skylines] at Think Sound Studios in North Carolina. Regarding this album, vocalist Kyle Bihrle was quoted saying, "We like to say that, "there is a little something for everybody" on this record. Expect all your favorite aspects of our music to be included. We bring the heavy, we bring the melodic, and we bring the ferocity." Sirens and Sailors set out on "The Wasteland at Sea" tour (June 2012) in support of this EP. This tour included support from Everyone Dies in Utah and Myka, Relocate. Sirens and Sailors supported headliner Belie My Burial, with additional support from Beheading of a King on the Northeast "Pale Beyond Tour" (July 2012). Sirens and Sailors provided direct support to The World We Knew on an East Coast tour (July–August 2012) with additional support from King Conquer. Sirens and Sailors headlined "The One The Rise Tour" (October 2012) with support from Us, From Outside and It Lives It Breathes. Sirens and Sailors supported headliner, Affiance with additional support from A Faylene Sky for a "mini-tour" (October–November 2012) through New York, Indiana, Missouri, Oklahoma and Texas. Sirens and Sailors provided support to headliner, Everyone Dies in Utah with additional support from Affiance and Deception of a Ghost in late November 2012 through the Midwest and West Coast. To begin 2013, Sirens and Sailors provided support to The Air I Breathe on their farewell tour (February 2013), with additional support from For All I Am, Famous Last Words, and This Romantic Tragedy; touring throughout the East Coast and Texas. Sirens and Sailors provided direct support to in Dying Arms on their first headline tour (April–May 2013); covering the East Coast through the Midwest. This tour also featured Mureau and Stand Your Ground. Vocalist Kyle Bihrle provided live guest vocals with Ice Nine Kills on the track "So This Is My Future" on May 25, 2013, at Water Street Music Hall in Rochester, New York. On June 4, 2013, the band announced their signing to Artery Recordings and Razor & Tie. On June 7, 2013, the band announced they would be providing support to August Burns Red, For Today, The Color Morale, My Children My Bride, and Fit For a King at the IMATTER Festival 2013; September 7, 2013, at Eldridge Park, Elmira, NY.

=== Skeletons and Rising Moon - Setting Sun (June 2013 – present) ===
The band entered the Atrium Audio studio in Lancaster, PA on June 20, 2013, to record their debut album under Artery Recordings and Razor & Tie. This album was engineered by Carson Slovak and Grant McFarland. On July 8, 2013, the band announced that their single "Go for the Throat" would be released via MetalInjection.net on July 9, 2013. The band announced that it had wrapped up recording on July 12, 2013. On August 8, 2013, the band announced they would be providing direct support to Oh, Sleeper on their headlining "mini-tour" (September 2013). On August 18, 2013, the band announced they will be proving direct support to Horizons on their headlining Canadian tour (October 2013) with other support from Chasing Safety (formerly Us, From Outside; name changed September 2013) and of Reverie. On August 19, 2013, the band announced their headlining of the "West Is Best" at The Gateway Center in Jamestown, New York on September 6, 2013, with support from Red Light Departure, Bungler, Valiance, and Elemantra. The band provided support to August Burns Red, For Today, and The Color Morale at the iMATTER Festival 2013 on September 7, 2013, at Eldridge Park, Elmira, New York. On August 30, 2013, the band announced that they will provide direct support to Gideon at the "585 vs 607 Showdown/The Southside Slammer" on October 1, 2013, in Elmira, New York.

On September 13, 2013, Alternative Press released the band's single "Straightjacket" on their website and announced that the band's second LP is entitled Skeletons and was scheduled for an October 29, 2013, release. Sirens and Sailors announced on September 18, 2013, their headliner at Kingdom in Richmond, Virginia on September 29, 2013, with support from Ascension, Terraphage, and Beyond These Doors; however this show was cancelled due to the unexpected closure of the venue. In November 2013 the band provided support to Ice Nine Kills on "The Predatour" with additional support from Famous Last Words, ERRA, and Chasing Safety. On October 11, 2013, the band announced it had filmed a music video for "Straightjacket" with Josiah Moore; and that they had teamed up with Bloody-Disgusting.com to premiere a new song entitled "Born & Raised (Flower City)" from the new album Skeletons. On October 18, 2013, the band released a lyric video for "Born & Raised (Flower City)". On October 13, 2013, the band announced their official Skeletons album release party at the Main Street Armory in Rochester, New York on November 1, 2013, with support from Ice Nice Kills, Famous Last Words, ERRA, Chasing Safety, Divinex, Before The Foundation, and Mercia. On October 23, 2013, Skeletons was officially streamed in its entirety via LambGoat.com.

On October 29, 2013, Skeletons was released as scheduled; and rose to No. 3 on iTunes' daily chart. On October 31, 2013, Sirens and Sailors released their music video for "Straightjacket" via RevolverMag.com. Sirens and Sailors supported I, The Breather on their mini-tour headliner (December 2013), with additional support from ERRA; and are currently playing the AmpedAndAlive.com-sponsored This or the Apocalypse headliner (January - February 2014), with additional support from Sworn In, and Shai Hulud. The band announced on November 19, 2013, that a drum play-through music video would be released for "The Chosen One" on November 22, 2013. It was filmed and edited by Josiah Moore and recorded live at Redbooth Studios by Brian Moore. Ultimate Fighting Championship middleweight Chris "The Crippler" Leben appeared at the UFC 168 weigh-ins on December 27, 2013, wearing a Sirens & Sailors' "Go for the Throat" tank. On January 2, 2014, the band announced their hometown headliner (February 22, 2014) with support from This or the Apocalypse, Sworn In, and Shai Hulud. The band announced on January 2, 2013, that a drum play-through music video would be released for "Exorcist" soon. It was released on February 3, 2014, via YouTube. On January 3, 2013, the band announced that they'd be playing the Amped and Alive-sponsored "Eat Your Heart Out Fest" along with 20+ more bands on April 20, 2014, at The Chance in Poughkeepsie, New York. On January 9, 2014, the band announced their inclusion in the Monumental "Lilac Metal Fest 2014" on February 15, 2014, in Spokane, Washington with This or the Apocalypse, Sworn In, Shai Hulud, Barrier, Adahliah, Silence, and Undertaker, amongst many more. On February 17, 2014, the band announced their inclusion in the GameLoud-sponsored 2014 "Skate and Surf Festival" on May 17, 2014, at the Middletown Sports Complex in Middletown, New Jersey; providing support to Midtown, Saosin, and The Early November.

On February 8, 2015, they announced through Facebook that they are working on a new album. They also announced that they had finished the drum tracking for said album. Not soon afterwards, the announced that they would be on the 2015 Vans Warped Tour lineup, and that they would possibly be playing tracks off of their new album on later dates. In May, they announced the title of the album, Rising Moon - Setting Sun, and released the track list. On June 12, 2015, they released the first audio track from the album, a song titled "Undefeated". Then in July, another audio track was released. The music video for the song "Rising Moon:Setting Sun" was released on August 7, alongside the release of the album itself. On August 14, multiple audio videos were put out.

On August 22, 2019, the band released "I'm Not Sorry," their first new material in four years.

== Musical style ==
Lead singer Kyle Bihrle told Broken Records Magazine in November 2012, that "our influences range from the music our parents made us listen to growing up, all the way to current music that we listen to today. That is the beauty of music, it's timeless. When we get together to practice and write, we do our best to create our own sound, but of course we are influenced by the music we love to listen to."

== Guest appearances ==
Vocalist Kyle Bihrle provided guest vocals for Arcane Haven on the track entitled "The Waters." This track was released independently on September 2, 2013. Kyle Bihrle appeared on Chasing Safety's song "My Revenge" from their 2014 album Season of the Dead.

== Band members ==
Current members

- Kyle Bihrle – unclean vocals (2005–present)
- Todd Golder – rhythm and lead guitar, clean vocals (2005–present)
- Jimm Lindsley – lead guitar (2008–present)
- Doug Court – drums, percussion (2008–present)
- Steve Goupil – bass guitar, backing vocals (2012–present), clean vocals (2019–present)

Former members

- Josh Deni – drums (2005–2008)
- Kevin Mahle – lead guitar (2005–2008)
- Jon Turner – bass guitar (2005–2011, died 2019)
- Nick Lord – bass guitar (2011–2012)
- Brian Woodruff – temporary guitar (2007–2008)

== Discography ==
Studio albums

Year	Album	Label
2010	Still Breathing	Self-released
2013	Skeletons	Artery Recordings, Razor & Tie
2015	Rising Moon: Setting Sun	Artery Recordings, Razor & Tie

EPs

- Sirens & Sailors self-titled EP (recorded & edited independently by Josh Deni - self-released, January 31, 2010)
- Wasteland EP (Tragic Hero Records, May 29, 2012)

Singles

- You and Die (Tragic Hero Records, May 4, 2012)
- Hold Fast (self-released, March 14, 2013)
- Birthday Parties For Puppies (self-released, April 21, 2013)
- Go for the Throat (Artery Recordings, Razor & Tie, July 9, 2013)
- Straightjacket (Artery Recordings, Razor & Tie, September 13, 2013)
- Born & Raised (Flower City) (Artery Recordings, Razor & Tie, October 11, 2013)
- I'm Not Sorry (August 2019)

== Music videos ==
Year	Song	Director(s)
2012	Mirror for My Medusa	Josiah Moore
2012	I've Got A Master's Degree in Common Sense	Josiah Moore
2013	Hold Fast	Josiah Moore
2013	Birthday Parties for Puppies	Josiah Moore
2013	Straightjacket	Josiah Moore
2013	The Chosen One	Josiah Moore
2015	Rising Moon: Setting Sun	Josiah Moore
2019	I'm Not Sorry	Josiah Moore

== Awards ==
On October 29, 2013, the Rochester City Newspaper presented the band the award for "Best Concert (Club/Small Venue)" for their sold-out show at the Club at Water Street Music Hall on Saturday, March 23, 2013.
