= Closure (Attila album) =

Studio album by Attila
- Released: July 23, 2021
- Recorded: 2020
- Genre: Nu metalcore
- Length: 31:40
- Label: Self-released
- Producer: Andrew Wade; Josh Schroeder

Attila chronology
Villain (2019)	Closure (2021)	FU4EVR (2023)

Singles from Closure
- 1. "Cancelled" Released: May 29, 2020; 2. "Clarity" Released: March 18, 2021; 3. "Metalcore Manson" Released: April 30, 2021; 4. "Day Drinking" Released: July 2, 2021

Closure is the ninth studio album by American metalcore band Attila. The album was released on July 23, 2021, a year after it was recorded. Rhythm guitarist Walter Adams and Tyler Kruckmeyer joined the band for this album.

== Track listing ==
No.	Title	Length
1.	"Anxiety"	3:08
2.	"Empty Clip"	2:56
3.	"Metalcore Manson"	2:46
4.	"Day Drinking"	3:27
5.	"Broke & Happy"	3:17
6.	"G-Squad"	3:10
7.	"Shots for the Girls"	3:03
8.	"Viva Las Vegas"	3:30
9.	"Cancelled"	3:06
10.	"Clarity"	3:30
Total length:		31:40

== Personnel ==
Attila

- Chris "Fronz" Fronzak – vocals
- Chris Linck – lead guitar
- Walter Adams – rhythm guitar
- Kalan Blehm – bass
- Tyler Kruckmeyer – drums

Additional personnel

- William Pokriots – co-writer
- Andrew Wade & Josh Schroeder – production
