= For All Those Sleeping =

American metalcore band

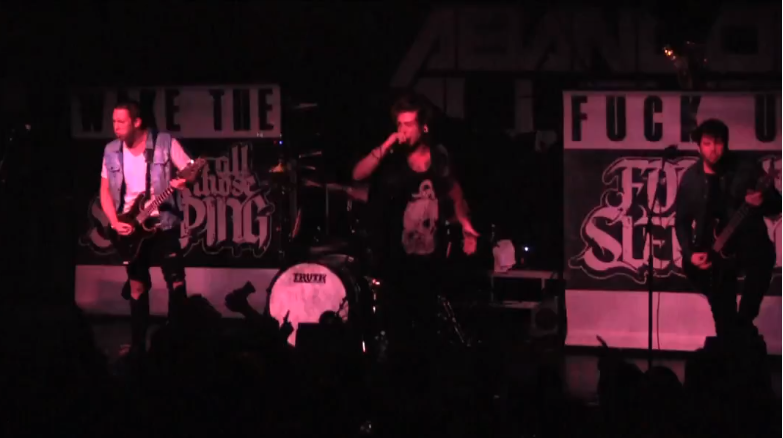
- For All Those Sleeping in 2012

Background information
- Origin: Sartell, Minnesota, U.S.
- Genres: Metalcore, post-hardcore
- Years active: 2007–2014
- Labels: Fearless
- Past members: Mike Champa; David Volgman-Stevens; Jerad Pierskalla; Ethan Trekell; London Snetsinger
- Website: For All Those Sleeping on Facebook

For All Those Sleeping was an American metalcore band formed in Sartell, Minnesota in 2007. The band released three studio albums, Cross Your Fingers, Outspoken, and Incomplete Me, all of which featured the same lineup. They announced their breakup in 2014.

== History ==
=== Formation and Cross Your Fingers (2007–2011) ===
For All Those Sleeping was formed in 2007 while Mike Champa, Jerad Pierskalla, David Volgman-Stevens and Ethan Trekell were still attending Sartell High School. Their self-released their 2007 demo and 2008 EP "The Lies We Live" featured the band's original sound which combined melodic sounds with pop punk influences, and brutal breakdowns. The band would later add bassist/vocalist London Snetsinger, replacing guitarist/keyboardist David Volgman-Steven's duties as the band's main clean vocalist. As their local fanbase grew, the band gained the attention of Fearless Records, and were signed in May 2010.

During the following months, the band was announced as supporting acts for multiple bands. In May they were announced as supporting acts for a short June tour featuring Honor Bright with From First To Last The band was also announced as support for Drop Dead Gorgeous's headlining tour along with Sleeping With Sirens, Attila, Abandon All Ships, Woe, Is Me and Scarlett O'Hara.

On June 25, 2010, the band announced pre-order bundles for their forthcoming album, Cross Your Fingers set for a July 20, 2010, release. The band also released their debut single from the album, "Never Leave Northfield". The second single, "Outbreak of Heartache" was released on July 13 through PureVolume

Their debut, Cross Your Fingers, released on July 20, 2010, through Fearless Records, was met with mostly mixed reviews.

Following the release of the album, the band toured extensively to promote their debut. On September 9, 2010, the band was announced as part of A Skylit Drive's November headlining tour with Motionless in White, Woe, Is Me and Scarlett O'Hara.

The band contributed "Maybe This Christmas" to the Fearless Records' Christmas Compilation.

On December 16, 2010, the band were announced as part of The Smart Punk Tour with The Word Alive, Upon a Burning Body, Abandon All Ships and The Color Morale beginning in March and ending in April.

In May 2011, the band made an appearance at Bled Fest. During 2011, the band participated in multiple tours, two prominent ones being the "2011 All Star Tour" in the summer, and the "Fearless Friends Tour" in the fall. They toured with After the Burial, Attila, Memphis May Fire, Motionless in White, Chelsea Grin and Sleeping With Sirens during the All Star, Tour and with fellow Fearless acts blessthefall, Motionless in White and The Word Alive during the fall.

August 17, 2011, the band was announced to support Falling in Reverse on their US headlining tour with Eyes Set to Kill beginning in September and ending in October.

The band released a music video for their song, "I'm Not Dead Yet" from their debut album, "Cross Your Fingers" during early October. The band later contributed their cover of Taylor Swift's song "You Belong With Me" as part of Fearless Records' Punk Goes Pop Volume 4.

=== Outspoken (2012–2013) ===
On January 17, 2012, the band announced that they would be entering the studio with Cameron Mizell to begin recording their second album.

In February 2012 the band announced that they had finished recording their second album.

On March 5, 2012, the band announced their spring US tour "The Soundrink Tour with direct support from In Fear and Faith, Dream On, Dreamer, Casino Madrid and Adestria.

Outspoken was released on June 19, 2012. This released was met with mostly average to positive reviews, most noting their improvement in their overall sound, and lyrical content, while also noting the stark similarities to other bands of their genre such as A Day to Remember. Prior to and following their second release the band toured with In Fear and Faith, and Attack Attack!

On August 19, 2012, the band was announced as part of the 2012 Scream It Like You Mean It Tour along with Woe, Is Me, Impending Doom, Abandon All Ships, Secrets, and Volumes.

On December 14, 2012, the band was announced as support for I See Stars' The Filthy February Tour with fellow supporting acts Get Scared, At the Skylines and Upon This Dawning.

On February 4, 2013, the band released their music video for, "Mark My Words". Towards the end of February the band was announced as support for Chunk! No, Captain Chunk!'s long-awaited US headlining tour with fellow support from City Lights and Upon This Dawning.

On April 4, 2013, the band was announced as part of the 2013 All Stars Tour alongside fellow acts; Every Time I Die, Chelsea Grin, Veil of Maya, Terror, Stray from the Path, Capture the Crown, Iwrestledabearonce, Dayshell and Volumes. On August 21, 2013, the band was announced as part of the Rise Up Tour supporting A Skylit Drive's new release with fellow supporting acts Wolves at the Gate, I the Mighty, and PVRIS. The band performed as part of Warped Tour Australia in November and December.

=== Incomplete Me and breakup (2014) ===
On January 1, 2014, the band was announced to be working on new music based on Fearless Records YouTube video announcing music being released by the label in the coming year by label artist.

On March 6, 2014, the band announced they would be playing all of Warped Tour 2014, along with PVRIS, The Summer Set, Get Scared, Dangerkids, DayShell, Heart to Heart, Pacific Dub, DJ Nicola Bear, Watsky, Wax and One oK Rock.

On May 7, 2014, the band announced that they would be releasing a new album, Incomplete Me through Fearless Records on June 23 during their time on this years Warped Tour. Incomplete Me was released to mostly mixed to positive reviews, but charted at #2 on both the iTunes Rock and the iTunes Metal Charts.

The group announced on their Facebook page on October 9, 2014, that they had disbanded and would be playing two more final shows, with support from Out Came The Wolves.

== Members ==
- Mike Champa – unclean vocals & backing clean vocals (2007–2014)
- David Volgman-Stevens – lead guitar, keyboards (2007–2014), clean vocals (2007–2008)
- Jerad Pierskalla – rhythm guitar, backing unclean vocals (2007–2014)
- Ethan Trekell – drums (2007–2014)
- London Snetsinger – bass, clean vocals (2008–2014)

Timeline

== Discography ==
=== Studio albums ===
Year	Album	Label	Chart peaks
Year	Album	Label	US
2010	Cross Your Fingers	Fearless Records	-
2012	Outspoken	Fearless Records	95
2014	Incomplete Me	Fearless Records	79

=== Extended plays ===
The Lies We Live (self-released, 2008)

=== Music videos ===
Year	Song	Director
2010	"Favorite Liar"	Cole Dabney
2011	"I'm Not Dead Yet"	n/a
2012	"Mark My Words"	Cody Blue Snider
2014	"Incomplete Me"	Dan Centrone
2014	"Poison Party (Famous)"	Josiah Van Dien
