= Chaos (Attila album) =

Studio album by Attila
- Released: November 4, 2016
- Studio: Grey Area Studios (North Hollywood, California)
- Genre: Nu metal; metalcore
- Length: 38:15
- Label: SharpTone
- Producer: Erik Ron

Attila chronology
Guilty Pleasure (2014)	Chaos (2016)	Villain (2019)

Singles from Chaos
- 1. "Public Apology" Released: September 16, 2016; 2. "Ignite" Released: September 23, 2016; 3. "Bulletproof" Released: October 7, 2016

Chaos is the seventh studio album by American nu metalcore band Attila. The album was released on November 4, 2016, through SharpTone Records. It is the band's only release on the label after leaving Artery Recordings, and is the first to be produced by Erik Ron, succeeding long-time producer Joey Sturgis. This is the last Attila album to feature Sean Heenan on drums.

== Track listing ==
No.	Title	Length
1.	"Ignite"	3:26
2.	"Bulletproof"	3:32
3.	"Public Apology"	3:41
4.	"Obsession"	3:25
5.	"Moshpit" (featuring Ookay)	3:30
6.	"Rise Up"	3:46
7.	"Let's Get Abducted"	3:34
8.	"Legend"	3:26
9.	"Queen"	3:27
10.	"All Hail Rock and Roll"	3:05
11.	"King"	3:23
Total length:		38:15

== Personnel ==
=== Attila ===
- Chris "Fronz" Fronzak – vocals
- Chris Linck – guitars
- Kalan Blehm – bass
- Sean Heenan – drums

=== Additional musicians ===
- Hollywood Undead (with Attila) – background vocals

=== Production ===
- Erik Ron – production and mixing
- Ue Nastasi – mastering

== Charts ==
Chart (2016)	Peak position
US Billboard 200	30
US Top Hard Rock Albums (Billboard)	2
US Top Rock Albums (Billboard)	3
