= Rising Moon: Setting Sun =

Studio album by Sirens and Sailors
- Released: August 07, 2015
- Genre: Metalcore
- Length: 33:09
- Label: Artery
- Producer: Kellen McGregor

Sirens and Sailors chronology
Skeletons (2013)	Rising Moon: Setting Sun (2015)

Singles from Rising Moon: Setting Sun
- 1. "Undefeated" Released: June 12, 2015; 2. "Chorus of the Dead" Released: July 3, 2015

Rising Moon: Setting Sun is the third studio album by American metalcore band Sirens and Sailors. The album was released on August 7, 2015, through Artery Recordings.

== Track listing ==
No.	Title	Length
1.	"Together We Fight"	1:31
2.	"Personal Hell (Page 394)"	3:17
3.	"Never There"	3:50
4.	"Hopeless One"	3:04
5.	"Rising Moon: Setting Sun"	3:58
6.	"Undefeated"	3:17
7.	"Chorus of the Dead"	3:12
8.	"Hate Me Blame Me"	3:39
9.	"Two Faced"	3:09
10.	"Together We Bleed"	4:14
Total length:		33:09

== Personnel ==
Credits by Allmusic

Sirens and Sailors

- Kyle Bihrle - lead vocals
- Doug Court - drums
- Todd Golder - rhythm guitar, clean vocals
- Jimm Lindsley - lead guitar
- Steven Goupil - bass

Production

- Kellen McGregor - Producer
- Brian Hood - Engineer, mastering, mixing
- Jordon Rigby - Engineer
- Josiah Moore - Art Direction, design
