= Villain (album) =

Studio album by Attila
- Released: February 22, 2019
- Genre: Nu metalcore
- Length: 31:00
- Label: Self-released
- Producer: Andrew Wade; Matt Good; Nick Sampson

Attila chronology
Chaos (2016)	Villain (2019)	Closure (2021)

Professional ratings
Review scores
Source	Rating
Dead Press!	6/10
Kill Your Stereo	50/100
Sputnikmusic	2/5 stars

Villain is the eighth studio album by American metalcore band Attila. The album was released on February 22, 2019. This is the only Attila album to feature drummer Bryan McClure, who was the replacement for their previous drummer Sean Heenan who left the band in 2017.

== Track listing ==
No.	Title	Length
1.	"Perdition"	1:44
2.	"Villain"	2:47
3.	"Blackout"	2:59
4.	"New Addiction"	3:13
5.	"Still About It"	3:17
6.	"Toxic"	2:33
7.	"It Is What It Is"	3:27
8.	"Subhuman"	4:04
9.	"Manipulate"	3:06
10.	"Bad Habits"	3:50
Total length:		31:00

Bonus track
No.	Title	Length
11.	"Pizza"	3:23
Total length:		34:23

== Personnel ==
Attila

- Chris "Fronz" Fronzak – vocals
- Chris Linck – guitars
- Kalan Blehm – bass
- Bryan McClure – drums

Additional personnel

- Andrew Wade & Matt Good – production
- Nick Sampson – co-production

== Charts ==
Chart (2019)	Peak position
US Top Hard Rock Albums (Billboard)	21
