= Incomplete Me =

Studio album by For All Those Sleeping
- Released: June 23, 2014
- Genre: Metalcore
- Length: 48:00
- Label: Fearless Records
- Producer: Cameron Mizell

For All Those Sleeping chronology
| Outspoken (2012) | Incomplete Me (2014) |

Singles from Incomplete Me
- 1. "Crosses" Released: May 13, 2014; 2. "Incomplete Me" Released: June 3, 2014

Incomplete Me is the third and final studio album from metalcore band For All Those Sleeping was released by Fearless Records on June 23, 2014.

== Background ==
Fearless Records released a video on January 1, 2014, listing artists on their roster who planned to release new material, which the band was a part of. The new album, the album artwork, and the track listing were announced on May 6, 2014. A teaser for their first single "Crosses" was posted later that day. The official lyric video was released on May 13. The band later released the debut music video for the album, the title-track 'Incomplete Me' on June 3.

== Promotion ==
The band played all of Warped Tour 2014, and the album was released while they were on tour. Fearless records released an album stream on their YouTube channel the day after the initial release.

== Track listing ==
| No. | Title | Length |
|---|---|---|
| 1. | "Crosses" | 4:00 |
| 2. | "Demons" | 4:12 |
| 3. | "Poison Party (Famous)" | 4:02 |
| 4. | "Incomplete Me" | 4:25 |
| 5. | "Home" | 3:50 |
| 6. | "Hell or Heaven (feat. Jessica Ess)" | 3:57 |
| 7. | "Red" | 4:03 |
| 8. | "My Funeral" | 4:08 |
| 9. | "Sex, Drugs & Empty Souls" | 3:15 |
| 10. | "Tomorrow (Casey's Song)" | 4:21 |
| 11. | "We're All Going To Die" | 3:20 |
| 12. | "It's Not Love (If It Doesn't Hurt)" | 4:26 |
| Total length: | | 48:00 |

== Personnel ==
- Mike Champa - unclean vocals, backing clean vocals
- London Snetsinger - bass, clean vocals
- Jerad Pierskalla - rhythm guitar, backing unclean vocals
- David Volgam-Stevens - lead guitar, keyboards
- Ethan Trekell - drums

Additional personnel

- Alan Douches - Mastering
- Jess Ess - Featured Artist
- Mike Farrell - Layout
- Cameron Mizel - Engineer, Producer
- Felicia Simion - Photography
- Sai Torres - A&R
