= Outspoken (album) =

Studio album by For All Those Sleeping
- Released: June 19, 2012
- Recorded: January 9–February 9, 2012
- Genre: Metalcore, post-hardcore, electronicore
- Length: 40:15
- Label: Fearless
- Producer: Cameron Mizell

For All Those Sleeping chronology
Cross Your Fingers (2010)	Outspoken (2012)	Incomplete Me (2014)

Singles from Outspoken
- 1. "Mark My Words" Released: April 25, 2012; 2. "Once a Liar (Always a Fake)" Released: June 1, 2012

Professional ratings
Review scores
Source	Rating
Allmusic	3/5 stars
Under The Gun Review	8/10

Outspoken is the second studio album from Minnesota-based band For All Those Sleeping, released through Fearless Records on June 19, 2012, nearly two years after their debut album Cross Your Fingers. The album showcases a much heavier metalcore sound with more prominent usage of unclean vocals and limited use of pop punk style choruses which were featured regularly on the aforementioned debut. Similarly to the first album, this album was also produced by Cameron Mizell.

On April 25, 2012, the band released the first single off the album, "Mark My Words", as a digital download on iTunes.

The album debuted at number 95 on the Billboard 200, selling over 4000 copies in its first week.

== Track listing ==
No.	Title	Length
1.	"Outspoken"	0:48
2.	"Once a Liar (Always a Fake)"	3:45
3.	"Mark My Words"	3:30
4.	"Tell Me the Truth"	3:28
5.	"Follow My Voice"	3:54
6.	"Turn of the Century"	3:27
7.	"Life on Fire"	4:02
8.	"Love Isn't Real"	2:57
9.	"Never Trust a Dead Man"	3:54
10.	"Shaken Not Stirred"	3:23
11.	"One Kiss"	4:01
12.	"Backstabber"	3:06

iTunes bonus track
No.	Title	Length
13.	"I Am Forever"	3:44

Japanese bonus track
No.	Title	Length
14.	"Take Back Everything"	3:20

== Chart performance ==
Chart (2012)	Peak position
US Billboard 200	95
US Billboard Independent Albums	21
US Billboard Rock Albums	39
US Billboard Hard Rock Albums	9
US Billboard Modern Rock/Alternative Albums	22

== Personnel ==
- Mike Champa - unclean vocals, backing clean vocals
- London Snetsinger - bass guitar, clean vocals
- Jerad Pierskalla - rhythm guitar, backing unclean vocals
- David Volgman-Stevens - lead guitar, keyboards
- Ethan Trekell - drums

Production

- Cameron Mizell - Production, engineering, Mixing
- Alan Douches - Mastering
- Justin Reich - Artwork, Layout, Photography
- Drew Fulk - Pre-Production
