= 'Til Death (album) =

Studio album by Capture the Crown
- Released: 18 December 2012
- Recorded: Late 2011 – early 2012 at Chango Studios in Orlando, Florida
- Genres: Metalcore; electronicore
- Length: 48:04
- Label: Sumerian
- Producers: Cameron Mizell, Dave Petrovic

Capture the Crown chronology
'Til Death (2012)	Live Life (2014)

Singles from 'Til death
- 1. "You Call That A Knife? This Is A Knife!" Released: 22 December 2011; 2. "#OIMATEWTF" Released: 11 March 2012; 3. "Ladies & Gentlemen...I Give You Hell!" Released: 1 July 2012; 4. "RVG" Released: 14 December 2012

Professional ratings
Review scores
Source	Rating
Impericon	4/6

'Til Death is the debut studio album by Australian metalcore band, Capture the Crown. The album was produced by Cameron Mizell at Chango Studios in Orlando, Florida and mastered by Joey Sturgis at Foundation Recording Studio in Connersville, Indiana. The album was released on 18 December 2012 through Sumerian Records. It peaked at No. 19 on the ARIA Heatseekers Albums, and in the United States it appeared on three Billboard component charts Top Hard Rock (No. 21), Top Heatseekers (No. 7), and Top Independent Albums (No. 25).

Four singles, "You Call That a Knife? This Is a Knife!", "#OIMATEWTF", "Ladies & Gentlemen...I Give You Hell!", and "RVG", have been released prior to the release of the album. "Help Me to Help You" is a re-recorded version of the song "Help Me to Help You Mr. Phil," which was performed by the band's previous incarnation, Atlanta Takes State.

It is the only album to feature original guitarist Blake Ellis. The album is mainly supported by the lead single "You Call That a Knife? This Is a Knife!". It became an internet hit, gaining over 13 Million views on YouTube. On April 3, 2020, the official video for the song, along with the official video for the single "#OIMATEWTF" were removed from YouTube for unknown reasons.

== Track listing ==
No.	Title	Length
1.	"The Arrival"	1:02
2.	"#OIMATEWTF" (featuring Denis Stoff)	3:37
3.	"Fork Tongued"	3:09
4.	"Ladies & Gentlemen... I Give You Hell"	3:51
5.	"LAX"	2:23
6.	"You Call That a Knife? This Is a Knife!"	4:07
7.	"Storm in a Teacup"	3:22
8.	"Help Me to Help You"	3:03
9.	"Deja Vu"	3:11
10.	"Insomniac"	4:36
11.	"RVG"	4:48
12.	"'Til Death"	4:09
13.	"The Departed 2.0"	3:58
14.	"Welcome to My Worlds" (bonus track)	2:49
Total length:		48:04

== Personnel ==
Capture the Crown

- Jeffrey Wellfare – vocals
- Blake Ellis – guitars, bass
- Jye Menzies – guitars, bass
- Kris Sheehan – bass, guitars
- Tyler "Lone America" March – drums

Production

- Produced by Cameron Mizell at Chango Studios in Orlando, Florida
- Mastered by Joey Sturgis at Foundation Recording Studios in Connorsville, Indiana
- Guest vocals on "#OIMATEWTF" by Denis Shaforostov (ex-Make Me Famous, ex-Down & Dirty, ex-Asking Alexandria)
