= Heat (American Me album) =

Studio album by American Me
- Released: February 19, 2008
- Genre: Metalcore
- Length: 34:32
- Label: Rise
- Producer: Kris Crummett

American Me chronology
Demo/EP (2006)	Heat (2008)	Siberian Nightmare Machine (2010)

Professional ratings
Review scores
Source	Rating
Ultimate Guitar	8.4 stars on a 10-point scale

Heat is the debut album by American metalcore band American Me. It was released on February 19, 2008, through Rise Records.

== Track listing ==
No.	Title	Length
1.	"Attributes of the Strong"	1:51
2.	"Black Malicious Lie"	2:22
3.	"Columbian Neck Tie"	2:19
4.	"Anfal Campaign"	3:06
5.	"Krystal Clear"	2:03
6.	"Said Nothing, Began Firing"	3:38
7.	"Grace Period"	2:35
8.	"Son of a Machine Gun"	2:17
9.	"Flybag"	2:27
10.	"Finish 'em All"	11:54
Total length:		34:32

== Personnel ==
=== American Me ===
- Tony Tataje – vocals
- Brian Blade – guitars, bass guitar
- Scott Walker – drums

=== Production ===
- Kris Crummett – production, mixing, mastering
