= Dealership =

A dealership is an authorized seller and may refer to:

- Car dealership
- Franchised dealership

== See also ==
- Dealership (band)
- Dealer (disambiguation)
