= Drug Dealer =

A drug dealer is a person involved in illegal drug dealing.

Drug Dealer may also refer to:

- "Drug Dealer" (song), by Macklemore featuring Ariana DeBoo, 2016
- "Drug Dealer", a song by Blackbear from the 2019 album Anonymous
- "Drug Dealer", a song by Machine Gun Kelly featuring Lil Wayne from the 2022 album Mainstream Sellout
- "Drug Dealer", a song by Texas Hippie Coalition from the 2008 album Pride of Texas
- Drugdealer, an American psychedelic rock musician
