= Lady Double Dealer =

Lady Double Dealer may refer to:

- "Lady Double Dealer", a song by Deep Purple from Stormbringer
- "Lady Double Dealer", a song by Krokus from Metal Rendez-vous
