= Extortionist (band) =

American deathcore band

- Origin: Spirit Lake, Idaho, U.S.
- Genres: Deathcore; metalcore; nu metal; beatdown hardcore
- Years active: 2013–2019, 2020–present
- Label: Unique Leader Records
- Members: Ben Hoagland; Riker Morrow; Clayton Blue; Vince Alvarez
- Past members: Adam Prince; Carl Schulz; Mac Rockwell; Sky Collins; Dylan Chandler; Kip Treeman; Rob Gibbs; Nick Mayhew; Joel Omans; Dominic Guggino; Jared (Crimewave) Suku; Juan Hernandez III
- Website: extortionist.bandcamp.com www.extortionist.co

Extortionist is an American deathcore/metalcore band formed in Idaho in 2013. The band consists of vocalist Ben Hoagland, bassist Riker Morrow, and drummer Vince Alvarez.

In 2014, the band signed to We Are Triumphant and released their debut EP, The Black Sheep, the same year. In 2017, they released their debut full-length studio album, The Decline. In 2019, their sophomore album, Sever the Cord, was released through Stay Sick Records. The same year, the band released their self-titled second EP, Extortionist.

The band split after their final show on October 5, 2019. They reunited in 2020, and immediately began writing new music, releasing the single "Once More in Torment" on October 5, 2021, exactly two years after their initial split. They currently operate in Salt Lake City and Idaho.

== History ==
=== The Decline (2017–2019) ===
On February 17, 2017, the band released their debut album, The Decline. The album was received well. It was recorded, mixed, and mastered by Calvin Russell of DJSM Studios.

On March 2, 2018, they released the standalone single "Absent Ones". On August 30, 2018, drummer Nick Mayhew and guitarist Mac Rockwell left the band while on tour with The Last Ten Seconds of Life and So This Is Suffering. Due to them being short two members, they were unable to complete the tour.

=== Sever the Cord and self-titled album (2019–2023) ===
In early 2019, the band announced their sophomore album Sever the Cord, which was released through Stay Sick Records on March 22 of that year. The album was received well, with Connor Welsh of New Transcendence giving it a 9 out of 10, and Metal Noise giving it a 7 out of 10. It was mixed and mastered by Mike Sahm of Dream Awake Studios. (Note: https://www.facebook.com/dreamawakeaudio/)

Two months later, they released their self-titled EP, Extortionist, on May 24, 2019. The EP was written in 2018 by Hoagland and Rockwell, but was released later after Rockwell left. They agreed that the EP should be released, and the funds from the release went towards suicide prevention.

On July 22, 2019, the band released a statement on their social media that they would be breaking up. They played their final tour on October 5, 2019, with Distinguisher, Dead Crown, and Straight to our Enemies in Spokane, Washington.

On July 8, 2020, the band quietly got back together and began teasing new material and asking fans what music they should make. On October 5, 2021, they released their new single "Once More in Torment", exactly two years after they initially split. Since 2022, they have been working on new music.

On May 19, 2023, they released remixed and remastered edition of their debut EP The Black Sheep for its 10-year anniversary. The edition features their former guitarist Joel Omans on the track "Rejection", and also features a bonus track called "Double Jump".

=== Devoid EP and Devoid of Love & Light (2023–present) ===
On October 5, 2023, the band officially moved to Salt Lake City, Utah, after adding the owner of Bamboo Audio, Clayton Blue to their lineup in September of the previous year. Nine days later, on October 24, 2023, the band announced they had signed with Unique Leader Records and would be releasing a new EP, Devoid, on December 1.

On February 21, 2024, the band announced plans on their social media to release their third album Devoid of Love & Light via Unique Leader Records on May 17, 2024.

== Musical style and influences ==
Metal Noise stated that Extortionist "[sits] in the centre of a Bermuda triangle between Nu-Metal, Beatdown Hardcore and Deathcore". The band is known for their signature "pangy" open snare and "dodgeball sound", which is made by slamming a metal beer keg with a baseball bat. Along with this, they incorporate heavy, downtuned guitars and aggressive growls with some occasional grunge-style bridges and choruses. Commenting on the album The Decline (2017), Ghost Cult Magazine stated that the band saw "their breed of brutalizing deathcore hybridized with riff-heavy metalcore and more introspective lyrics that tackled suicidal ideation and substance abuse."

== Band members ==
Current members

- Ben Hoagland – lead vocals (2013–2019, 2020–present), guitar (2013, 2026–present)
- Vince Alvarez – drums (2024–present)
- Riker Morrow - Bass (2013–2018), (2025-present)

Former members

- Clayton Blue – guitar (2022–2026)
- Kip Treeman – guitar (2014–2018), bass (2018–2019, 2020–2024)
- Juan Hernandez III – guitar (2016–2019, 2020–2024)
- Carl Schulz – guitar (2019)
- Mac Rockwell – guitar / vocals (2017–2018)
- Nick Mayhew – drums (2017–2018)
- Rob Gibbs – drums (2015–2018)
- Joel Omans – guitar (2013–2014, 2017)
- AJ Nussbaum – bass (2013)
- Jonathan Chase – bass (2013)
- Sky Collins – guitar (2013–2014)
- Dylan Chandler – drums (2013–2015), bass (2013)
- Adam Prince – lead vocals (2013)
- Dominic Guggino – drums (2018–2019, 2020–2024)
- Jared (Crimewave) Suku – guitar (2014–2017, 2020–2024)

Timeline

== Discography ==
=== Studio albums ===
- The Decline (2017)
- Sever the Cord (2019)
- Devoid of Love & Light (2024)
- Stare into the Seething Wounds (2025)

=== EPs ===
- The Black Sheep (2014)
- Extortionist (2019)
- Devoid (2023)
