= Distinguisher (band) =

American metal band

- Origin: Las Vegas, Nevada, U.S.
- Genres: Nu metal; metalcore; hardcore punk; deathcore
- Years active: 2014–2022
- Label: Independent
- Members: Nick Chance; Brad Cornelius; Josh Bearden; Jacob Barsoum
- Past members: Joshua Wilson
- Website: undertheweight.co

Distinguisher was an American metalcore band formed in Las Vegas, Nevada, in 2014. The band's final lineup consisted of vocalist Nick Chance, guitarist Josh Bearden, bassist Brad Cornelius, and drummer Jacob Barsoum.

Distinguisher released their debut album, "What's Left of Us", on February 10, 2017, which received high praise from the underground metal community. They wasted no time aggressively touring in the early stages of their tenure which ultimately lead to a record deal with Modern Empire in 2019. The band's sophomore effort "Hell from Here" was released on July 19 that same year. COVID-19 and the shutdown of all touring would result in a silent two years from Distinguisher until they unveiled 3 new singles; "Nothing Is Real / We All Suffer", and "Violent Reaction" in 2021.

Distinguisher's latest release "Under The Weight Of Things I Couldn't Change" was released on March 11, 2022.

"Under the Weight of Things I Couldn’t Change. The six track extended play produced by Josh Bearden of Nevermore Recordings, visually constructed by Nick Chance and Jacob Barsoum, original pour painting by Brad Cornelius, layout and design by Ben Hoagland.

The idea of this EP came about early into the global shutdown. With no intention of rushing a full length, Distinguisher began to dial in what would be their most aggressive, and refined sound to date. The final result; six songs that capture every feeling, every moment, and every tragedy of the past two years. "You are forced to accept the things that you cannot change."

Much of their packaging and merchandise is designed by Ben Hoagland, vocalist of Extortionist.

== History ==
=== What's Left of Us (2017–2019) ===
On February 10, 2017, they released their debut album "What's Left of Us", which was their final release with vocalist Joshua Wilson. It was received well, with Connor Welsh of New Transcendence giving it a 9 out of 10.

=== Hell from Here (2019–present) ===
On July 19, 2019, the band announced their sophomore album "Hell From Here", which was released through Stay Sick Records. It was their first album with new vocalist and former deathcore drummer, Nick Chance.

On April 1, 2021, the band released the 2-song EP "Nothing Is Real / We All Suffer", which was their first music in almost 2 years.

On January 21, 2022, the band released the single "Without End" from their new EP, "Under The Weight Of Things I Couldn't Change", which they announced In February 2022, and released on March 11, 2022. It was produced, mixed, and mastered by Josh Bearden.

== Musical style and influences ==
Distinguisher can be categorized as metalcore or deathcore with some hardcore influence as well.

== Band members ==
Final lineup

- Nick Chance – lead vocals (2019–2022)
- Josh Bearden – guitar (2014–2022)
- Brad Cornelius – bass (2014–2022)
- Jacob Barsoum – drums (2014–2022)

Former members

- Joshua Wilson – vocals (2014–2019)

== Discography ==
=== Studio albums ===
- What's Left of Us (2017)
- Hell From Here (2019)

=== EPs ===
- Helpless (2015)
- Nothing Is Real / We All Suffer (2021)
- Under the Weight of Things I Couldn't Change (2022)

== Charts ==
Chart performance for Hell From Here
Chart (2019)	Peak position
US Top Hard Rock Albums (Billboard)	19
