= Scars of Tomorrow =

American metalcore band

- Origin: Orange County, California, United States
- Genre: Metalcore
- Years active: 2000–2007, 2010–2026
- Labels: Thorp, Victory, Artery
- Members: Bob Bradley
- Past members: Mike Milford

Scars of Tomorrow is an American metalcore band from Orange County, California.

== History ==
Scars of Tomorrow released its first material on Thorp Records, issuing two albums before signing to Victory Records in May 2003. After Victory released the group's third album in February 2004, they toured with Himsa, Atreyu, and Norma Jean. Upon the release of their fourth album and second with Victory, The Horror of Realization, in 2005, the group was slated to tour with Bury Your Dead, but shortly before the tour began, all of the members except lead vocalist Mike Milford left the group. Milford quickly replaced all the members with Lisa Marx, Joey Atkins and Ryan Severino to the band and completed the tour as originally scheduled. After further lineup changes, the group's fifth studio effort was released in October 2006; in the meantime, Thorp Records released The Beginning Of..., a compilation of tracks from the band's first two albums. After further touring, the group disbanded in May 2007. In 2010, the band reformed and to this day occasionally plays shows and releases music. The album Failed Transmissions was released in 2014 through Artery Recordings along with the follow-up single "Perspectives" in 2018. As of 2020, the members have alluded to new material for a future release.

Vocalist Mike Milford died from cancer in August 2026.

== Members ==
=== Current members ===
- Bob Bradley – bass (2000–2005, 2010–present)

=== Former members ===
- Mike Milford – lead vocals (2000–2007, 2010–2026; his death)
- Ruben Martinez – drums (2000–2003)
- Geoff Harman – guitar (2000–2003)
- Carlos Garcia – guitar (2000–2005; studio/session 2013–2014)
- Mike Madariaga – guitar (2003)
- Chris Warner – drums (2003–2005)
- Dave Rodriguez – guitar (2003–2005)
- Dan Bieranowski – bass (2005–2006)
- Lisa Marx – guitar (2005–2006)
- Ryan Severino – drums (2005–2006)
- Joey Atkins – guitar, clean vocals (2005–2007)
- Kevin Fifield – guitar (2005–2007)
- Mike Boccuzzi – bass (2006–2007)
- Justin Salinas – drums (2006–2007, 2013–2014)
- Therron Francis – guitar (2014–2015)
- Michael Nordeen – guitar (2014–2015)
- Sam Shepard – drums (2014–2015)

Timeline

== Discography ==
Studio albums

- All Things Change (Thorp Records, 2002)
- Design Your Fate (Thorp, 2003)
- Rope Tied to the Trigger (Victory Records, 2004)
- The Horror of Realization (Victory, 2005)
- The Failure in Drowning (Victory, 2006)
- Failed Transmissions (Artery Recordings, 2014)

Compilations

- The Beginning Of... (Thorp Records, 2006)

Singles

- "Perspectives" (Self-released, 2018)
