= Dealer (TV series) =

2021 French thriller television series

- Genre: Action; Crime drama; Thriller
- Created by: Ange Basterga
- Written by: Ange Basterga; Nicolas Lopez
- Directed by: Ange Basterga Nicolas Lopez
- Starring: Abderamane Diakhite; Mohamed Boudouh : Sébastien Houbani; Idir Azougli
- Country of origin: France
- Original language: French
- No. of seasons: 1
- No. of episodes: 10

Production
- Producers: Aurélie Meimon; Noor Sadar
- Cinematography: Mika Colleton
- Running time: 8–15 minutes
- Production company: Frenchkiss Pictures

Original release
- Network: Netflix
- Release: 10 March 2021

Dealer (French: Caïd) is a 2021 French television series created by Ange Basterga and Nicolas Lopez that premiered on Netflix on 10 March 2021. The series consists of 10 episodes

== Synopsis ==
Tony is a young rapper and leader of an organized criminal gang dealing cannabis and other narcotics in a city in southern France. The label of his record company sends him a director, Franck and a cameraman, Thomas, to shoot a clip. The two men become witnesses to a gang war.

== Cast and characters ==
- Abderamane Diakhite as Tony
- Mohamed Boudouh as Moussa
- Sébastien Houbani as Franck
- Idir Azougli as Steve
- Julien Meurice as Thomas
- Abdillah Assoumani as Mabs
- Mohamed Souare as Kylian
- Yvan Sorel as Blanche Neige
- Jean-Toussaint Bernard as the voice of Thomas
- Alexy Brun as Alex
- Nazim Kaabeche as Zimo
- Romain Vissol as the voice of Bruno du label
- Siti Hamadi as Jess
- Houda Salhi as Houda
- Kilian Da Costa as Kilian
- Jafar Moughanim as Ahmed

== Episodes ==
No.	Title	Directed by	Written by	Original release date
1	"Spielberg"	Ange Basterga & Nicolas Lopez	Ange Basterga, Nicolas Lopez & Nicolas Peufaillit	10 March 2021
The filmmakers Franck (Sebastien Houbani) and Thomas (Julien Meurice) arrive to a slum in the south of France to meet Tony (Abderamane Diakhite), an up-and-coming rapper and gang leader, recently released from prison, who wants to make a music video. Intimidated by the hostility of the ruling gangs, they end up witnessing a shooting just after their car and equipment were confiscated, leaving them trapped.
2	"Blow By Blow"	Ange Basterga & Nicolas Lopez	Ange Basterga, Nicolas Lopez & Nicolas Peufaillit	10 March 2021
Franck confronts the management of the record label about the dangerous working conditions, but his call is interrupted by Tony, who forces them to continue filming. Tony is confronted by his sister Jess (Siti Hamadi), who warns him to keep their younger brother, Kylian (Mohamed Souare), away from the dangerous life on the streets. The gang's second in command, Moussa (Mohamed Boudouh), a promising athlete lost due to a heart disease, finds the perpetrator of the shooting and organizes a meeting to which the filmmakers reluctantly attend.
3	"Crackhead"	Ange Basterga & Nicolas Lopez	Ange Basterga, Nicolas Lopez & Nicolas Peufaillit	10 March 2021
Tony and Moussa meet to Steve (Idir Azougli), the psychotic leader of an emerging rival gang, who gives them a 48-hour ultimatum to obtain the contact of their cannabis supplier. After the meeting, Moussa confronts Tony about his indifferent handling of the situation, urging dialogue instead of confrontation, claiming that he has not been the same since his release from prison. Tony insists he has a plan and they all head home. Franck and Thomas are escorted to a makeshift bedroom, where they are locked in for the night, there they argue about the situation, with Franck excited at the great opportunity they have to film something unique.
4	"ARAH!"	Ange Basterga & Nicolas Lopez	Ange Basterga, Nicolas Lopez & Nicolas Peufaillit	10 March 2021
The filmmakers hand out GoPro cameras to other members of the gang to get varied shots of the neighborhood, denying Kylian one when he insists on participating. A man who ensured Tony's safety as a child confronts him and the filmmakers for glorifying the life of crime on the streets, only to be interrupted by a sudden police raid in the area. The cameras capture different angles of the raid, with motorcycles hitting the patrol cars and neighbors attacking the uniformed officers. The group escapes from the patrols through the alleys and surrounding buildings, however, Tony is forced to expose himself when Kylian is detained by an agent, who decides to take him in his place, threatening to take him back to prison.
5	"Green"	Ange Basterga & Nicolas Lopez	Ange Basterga, Nicolas Lopez & Nicolas Peufaillit	10 March 2021
Franck and Thomas films the arrest of Tony, who is eventually freed by a corrupt agent who tries to make a deal with him to hand over Steve and bring fragile peace back to the neighborhood. Tony refuses to cooperate, claiming not to be a snitch. Returning home again, Jess questions Tony about making a decision about his future, since he cannot be a rapper and a criminal leader at the same time. Finally, Tony vents privately to Franck, confessing his desire to leave the streets and give himself the opportunity for a quiet and legitimate life as a rapper, with concerns about how his gang colleagues might take it.
6	"Freestyle"	Ange Basterga & Nicolas Lopez	Ange Basterga, Nicolas Lopez & Nicolas Peufaillit	10 March 2021
Once again, the filming of the music video is interrupted by the sudden appearance of Steve in the neighborhood, to which Tony pacifies the situation by offering to become his supplier, closing the deal that same night with the delivery of a good amount of merchandise, something that Moussa completely disapproves. After finishing filming, Tony invites Franck and Thomas to a barbecue with the rest of the neighbors to celebrate after the deal with Steve. However, the record label executives reject footage of Tony's daily life, demanding "more shocking" images. Franck tries to comply with the demand by asking to be present during the exchange with Steve, but is flatly denied by Tony due to the danger that this would mean. However, Kylian offers to help them, filming everything they need from a safe distance, to which Franck agrees and gives him a GoPro camera, unbeknownst to Tony.
7	"Bash"	Ange Basterga & Nicolas Lopez	Ange Basterga, Nicolas Lopez & Nicolas Peufaillit	10 March 2021
Night falls and Tony and Steve's men meet at an old parking lot. Franck and Thomas wait anxiously with for no altercations to occur. Kylian is abandoned by his friend when he decides to follow the cars to the meeting point. At first, he keeps filming from an upper floor of the parking lot, but decides to get closer when he can't catch everything their saying. The exchange is successful and Tony's men retreat, leaving Tony, Franck, Thomas and the rest of the gang relieved to start the barbecue. However, when Steve's men begin to retreat, Kylian decides to follow the car, being discovered and caught by the hitmen, believing him to be a snitch. The rest of the group doesn't realized what happened, only Franck and Thomas find out once they decide to review what Kylian's GoPro camera had been filming.
8	"Snitch"	Ange Basterga & Nicolas Lopez	Ange Basterga, Nicolas Lopez & Nicolas Peufaillit	10 March 2021
9	"Hitmen"	Ange Basterga & Nicolas Lopez	Ange Basterga, Nicolas Lopez & Nicolas Peufaillit	10 March 2021
10	"Big Shot"	Ange Basterga & Nicolas Lopez	Ange Basterga, Nicolas Lopez & Nicolas Peufaillit	10 March 2021

== Production ==
Nicolas Lopez, originally from the city of Martigues, and Ange Basterga, a Corsican who grew up in Seine-Saint-Denis, invested all their savings to write, direct and self-produce the film Caïd in 2017. The film was only entitled to 4 days of shooting with non-professional actors. Caïd won the prize for Best Feature Film at the Festival Polar de Cognac. The production company FrenchKiss Pictures and Netflix decided to make a series. The two directors rewrote the story with Nicolas Peufaillit (A Prophet by Jacques Audiard) in 10 episodes of 10 minutes. They shot again in Martigues in 2020 with the same crew of actors with a found footage technique.
