= American Me (band) =

American metalcore band

- Origin: Portland, Oregon, U.S.
- Genre: Metalcore
- Years active: 2006–present
- Label: Rise
- Spinoff of: It Prevails
- Members: Tony Tataje; Brian Blade; Cameron Bledsoe; Joseph Manning; Duncan Allen
- Website: American Me on Facebook

American Me is an American metalcore band from Portland, Oregon, whose music also featured elements of various genres of heavy metal and hip hop. The band was formed in 2006 and signed with Rise Records in late 2007. The band's music is often described as 'brutal hardcore' and is known for its fast pace and heavy sound.

The band's first studio album, Heat, was released in 2008. The album received praise from reviewers for exhibiting a unique, heavier style of hardcore punk, combining hardcore punk and heavy metal with a slight hip hop edge.

== History ==
American Me was formed in Portland, Oregon in 2006 by high school friends, Tony Tataje and Brian Blade after gaining inspiration from the 1992 film of the same name. Originally, the band was a side-project of melodic hardcore band, It Prevails, although it soon became a full-time band in its own right, distinguished by a far heavier sound. Their influences include: Hatebreed, Buried Alive, Fear Factory, Sepultura, Slipknot, Cannibal Corpse and 90's hip hop.

After constant touring since 2006, in November 2009 while touring in support of the release of their second studio album, Siberian Nightmare Machine, the band's tour trailer was burglarized in Antelope, California causing the loss of their equipment and merchandise which prompted a year-long hiatus from touring.

After recovering from their robbery and parting ways with hired touring members, the core members re-formed with new drummer, Duncan Allen and released their third studio album, III on August 14, 2012. Later that year, the band embarked on a month-long tour of Europe. In August 2013 the band was added to the "No Way Out Tour" in support of label mates, The Acacia Strain.

In early 2017 they announced they were working on a new EP called Still Firing. The EP was released on November 17, 2017, via Rise Records. Their new music video, "Anti Life Equation", which features AJ Channer of Fire From the Gods, was released on November 15, 2017.

As of 2023, they are reported to be working on new material and occasionally play local shows.

== Band Members ==
- Tony Tataje – vocals (2006–present)
- Brian Blade – guitar/vocals (2006–present)
- Cameron Bledsoe – guitar/vocals (2006–2007, 2009–present)
- Duncan Allen – drums (2011–present)
- Eric Gemme – bass (2026–present)

=== Former & Fill-in Members ===
- Ian Fike – bass/vocals (2006–2007)
- Aaron Marsh – drums (2006–2007, 2009–2010)
- Phillip Ralston – guitar (2007–2009)
- Doug Funny – bass (2007–2008)
- Scott Walker – drums (2007-2008)
- Nate Dorval – live bass/vocals (2008–2009)
- Charles Nikolet – live drums (2008–2009)
- Adam Levesque – live drums (2010–2011)
- Michael Nordeen – live bass (2009–2010)
- Pig Tooth – live bass (2010–2011)
- Jason Clifford – live bass (2011–2012)
- Tony Cornella - bass (2012–2017)
- Joseph Manning - guitar (2013 - 2017), bass (2017 - 2023)

== Discography ==
Studio albums

- Heat (2008)
- Siberian Nightmare Machine (2009)
- III (2012)

EP

- Still Firing (2017)

Demos

- Demo/EP (2006)

== Videography ==
- "Back Malicious Lie" (2006)
- "Anti-Life Equation" (2017)

== Tours ==
- "Japan Tour" (2011)
