= Death Dealer =

Death Dealer may refer to:

- Death Dealer (painting), a 1973 fantasy painting, fictional character and book series created by Frank Frazetta
- The Death Dealers, a mystery novel by Isaac Asimov
- Death Dealer (Underworld), the vampire warriors from the Underworld film series
- Vengeance Is a Dish Served Cold, also known as Death's Dealer, a 1971 Italian Western film
- Death Dealer (band), a heavy metal band with ex-Manowar guitarist Ross the Boss
- Death Dealers (album), a 2011 album by Adept
- The Death Dealer, a paranormal romance novel by Heather Graham Pozzessere
- Death Dealer: the Memoirs of the SS Kommandant at Auschwitz, an autobiography by Rudolf Höss
- "Death Dealers", a nickname for the 67th Armored Regiment in the US Army
- Death Dealer (character), a comic book character in Marvel Comics.
