= It Prevails =

American metalcore band

- Origin: Portland, Oregon, U.S.
- Genres: Melodic hardcore, metalcore, hardcore punk
- Years active: 2004–2016, 2019–present
- Labels: Mediaskare, Rain City, Rise, Stay Sick
- Members: James Ian Fike; Ryan Knowles; Dave Catuccio; Cameron Bledsoe; Therron Francis
- Website: facebook.com/itprevails

It Prevails is an American metalcore/melodic hardcore band from Portland, Oregon, formed in 2004. They are influenced by bands such as Shai Hulud, Twelve Tribes, Strongarm, Lifetime and Hot Water Music.

Their sound has been compared to Shai Hulud and Killswitch Engage. Their lyrics have been described as "covering typical post-emo terrain."

== History ==
The band formed in 2004, releasing the EP Indelible in May 2005. After touring the U.S. West Coast twice in 2006, the quintet released their debut album The Inspiration in 2007 through Rise Records.

In 2008, the band recorded their second album Capture and Embrace for independent label Rain City Records. The band worked with guitarist and producer Beau Burchell (of Saosin) to mix the album, but went on a hiatus after original drummer Aaron Marsh decided to leave. The band also parted ways with a guitarist for personal reasons. These issues resulted in the cancellation of their tours with Ligiea, Since the Flood, Means and Farewell to Freeway. Capture and Embrace was not supported by any national tour, save a brief West Coast tour in 2009 before their first European tour in August 2009.

After more lineup changes and a relocation to Colorado, It Prevails announced the addition of guitarist Bobby VaLeu and drummer Ian Clark. They also announced the release of a three-track EP, Findings, and their summer tour with Close Your Eyes, followed up with a UK and mainland European tour with Heart in Hand.

After returning from the UK in 2010, It Prevails took up-and-coming Canadian acts Counterparts and A Sight for Sewn Eyes along on the band's first tour of Eastern Canada. During this period, the band shot a music video for the song "Placed in My Hands", and on the way home from Canada, shot another music video for "An Anomaly" outside of Birmingham, Alabama. In 2011, the band signed a deal with Mediaskare Records and released Stroma on July 19, 2011.

In 2011 and 2012, It Prevails released three new songs, eventually announcing that a new album was being written, titled Perdition. In April 2013, the band added Joe Butler and Nate George of Agraceful as their new lead guitarist and drummer, respectively. They also announced the addition of Billy Adams on bass. On January 20, 2015, the band released their fourth full-length album Perdition.

After four years of silence, the band debuted their first single off their upcoming EP A Life Worth Living, "Lair Hill", on July 8, 2019. The EP was released through Stay Sick Recordings.

== Band members ==
Current

- James Ian Fike – vocals (2004–2016, 2019–present)
- Cameron Bledsoe – bass (2006–2009, 2019–present)
- Therron Francis – guitar (2008–2009, 2019–present)
- Dave Catuccio – drums (2014–2016, 2019–present)
- Ryan Knowles – guitar, backing vocals (2019–present)

Former

- Alex Kutsche – guitar (2004–2006, 2009–2010), bass (2009–2010)
- Brian Blade – guitar (2005–2008)
- Daniel Harbold – guitar & vocals (2007–2008)
- Nic Toten – guitar (2008, 2011–2016)
- Jake Harris – guitar (2007, 2010–2011)
- Chris Tsanjoures – guitar (2010–2013)
- Nate Dorval – bass (2010–2013)
- Aaron Marsh – drums (2004–2008, 2011)
- Tanner Bama – drums (2008–2009)
- Ian Clark – drums (2009–2010)
- Jarrod Rose – drums (2011–2013)
- Nate George – drums (2013–2014)

Touring

- Kyle Lottman – guitar (2008)
- Bobby VaLeu – guitar (2009–2010)
- Derek Zook – drums (2010)

== Discography ==
- Indelible (EP) (self-released, 2005)
- The Inspiration (Rise Records, 2007)
- Capture & Embrace (Rain City Records, 2009)
- Findings (EP) (The Form Records, 2010)
- Re:Findings – split with Evylock (Falling Leaves Records, 2011)
- Stroma (Mediaskare Records, 2011)
- Perdition (Mediaskare Records, 2015)
- A Life Worth Living (EP) (Stay Sick Recordings, 2019)
