= The Artery Foundation =

Management company based in California

- Company type: Public
- Industry: Music
- Founded: 2004
- Founder: Eric Rushing, Greg Patterson, Shawn Carrano
- Headquarters: California, United States
- Area served: Worldwide
- Website: thearteryfoundation.com

The Artery Foundation is a management company based in California and founded in 2004. The Artery Foundation finds, represents, supports and manages various entertainment artists.

The Artery Foundation hosts its own North American tour Artery Foundation Across the Nation Tour, which started in 2008 and has since then expanded to Europe. The tour is often held in the springtime. The company also hosts an annual free showcase at the South by Southwest music festival where fans line up as early as 4:00 am to guarantee a spot into the show.

During the summer of 2012, The Artery Foundation opened up an additional office in Australia.

== Artery Recordings ==
In 2010 Eric Rushing started Artery Recordings, an imprint record label with Razor & Tie.
