= Capture (band) =

Australian metalcore band

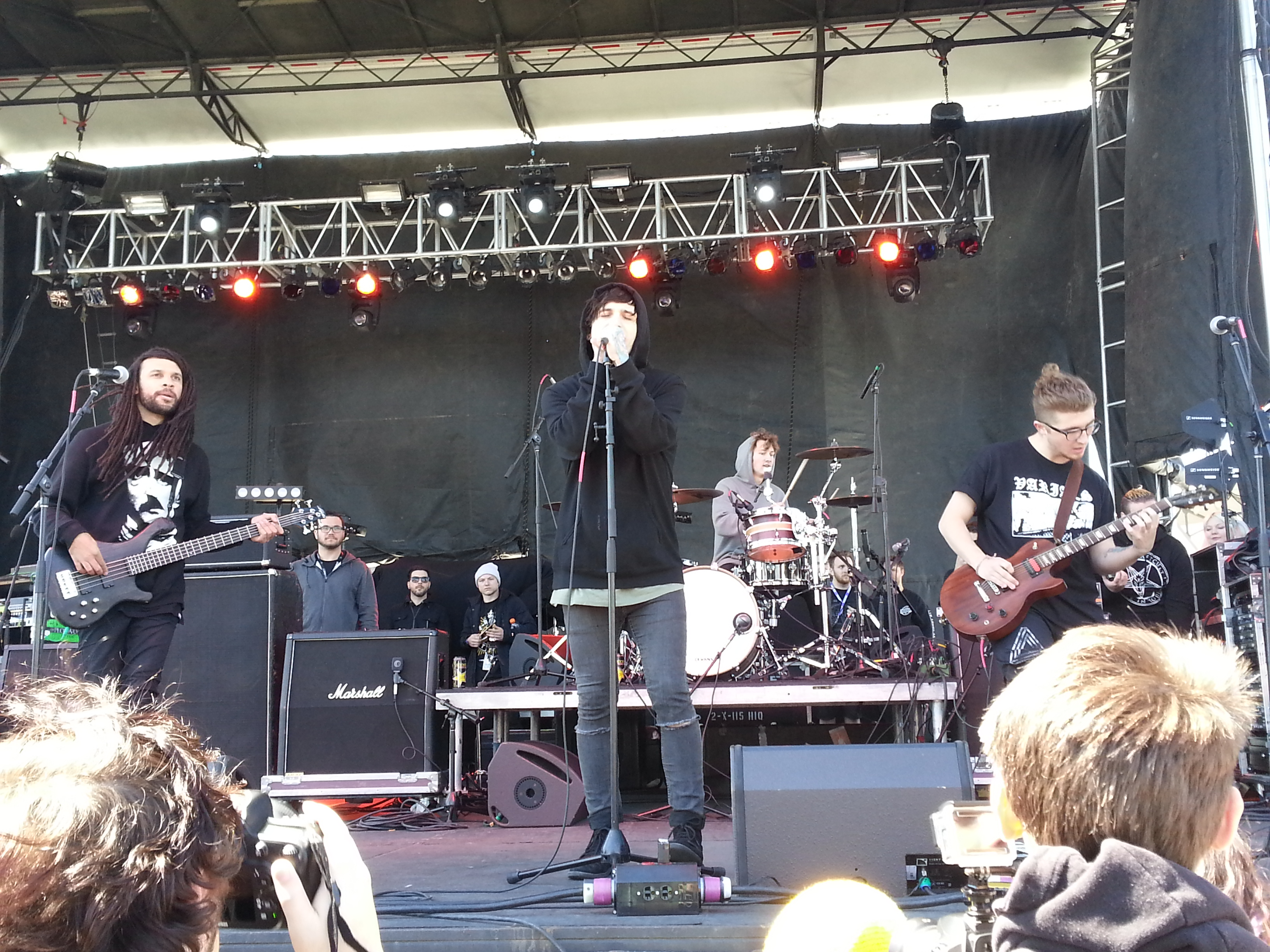

Background information
- Also known as: Capture the Crown
- Origin: Sydney, New South Wales, Australia
- Genres: Metalcore, electronicore (early)
- Years active: 2010–2020
- Labels: Sumerian, Artery
- Past members: Jeffrey Welfare; Blake Ellis; Jye Menzies; Joe Abikhair; Tyler March; Kris Sheehan; Ryan Seritti; Kyle Devaney; Mitch Rogers; Maurice Morfaw; Alec Hoxsey; Robert Weston; Alex Maggard; Manny Dominick; Erik Vaughn Weatherford III
- Website: Capture on Facebook

Capture (originally known as Capture the Crown) were an Australian metalcore band formed in early 2010 after the break-up of another metalcore outfit, Atlanta Takes State. The band rose to prominence for their song "You Call That a Knife? This Is a Knife!" (2011) on YouTube. The band was signed to Sumerian Records in December 2012 but were dropped in October the following year. They have issued two studio albums, 'Til Death (18 December 2012), which appeared on three Billboard component charts Top Hard Rock (No. 21), Top Heatseekers (No. 7), and Top Independent Albums (No. 25), and Reign of Terror (5 August 2014), which charted at #86 on the U.S. Billboard 200. An extended play, Live Life, was released on 4 February 2014, and the band signed with Artery Recordings. In March 2017, the group shortened its name to simply Capture.

== History ==
=== Inception and 'Til Death (2010–2012) ===
Formed in early 2010 in Sydney by Blake Ellis on guitar (later on bass guitar), Jye Menzies on guitar and Jeffrey Wellfare on lead vocals. The band gained popularity through their YouTube channel, and first release "You Call That a Knife? This Is a Knife!", quickly reaching five million views in under one year. All three, Wellfare, Menzies, and Ellis were previously in another metalcore band, Atlanta Takes State. While their music video quickly rose them to popularity in the scene, it also gained them criticism for resembling other bands in the genre, such as Asking Alexandria. Their original drummer, Tyler March (known by his nickname, Lone America, and for playing drums in A Late Night Serenade), is the only member not from Australia, being from Carlisle, Pennsylvania in the United States. The other members met him online and he was asked to join. Kris Sheehan joined in 2011, having played in Curse at 27 with Wellfare.

Four months later on 11 March 2012, the band released their second single, "#OIMATEWTF", which features guest vocals by Denis Shaforostov, from the band Make Me Famous at that time. The video reached almost 500,000 views in under six months. A month later, a cover of Jason Derülo's song "In My Head" was released, followed by the band's fourth single, "Ladies & Gentlemen... I Give You Hell", released 1 July 2012, reaching 350,000 views in just under two months.

On 20 August 2012, the band announced that they were supporting Woe, Is Me's Talk Your [S]#?!, We'll Give You a Reason Tour, with fellow supporting acts Chunk! No, Captain Chunk!, Our Last Night, Secrets, and The Seeking. On 19 November that year, the band was announced as part of Of Mice & Men's 2013 US Headlining tour with fellow acts Woe, Is Me, Texas in July, and Volumes from mid-January to early February.

On 24 November 2012 the band announced their debut album, 'Til Death on 18 December which they would be self-releasing and have pre-order packages set up on the band's webstore. With the announcement the band revealed the album's artwork and track listing. By 3 December 2012 the band had signed with Sumerian Records which would issue their forthcoming album. Along with the announcement, a music video for "Ladies & Gentlemen...I Give You Hell" appeared.

On 13 December the band began streaming a new single from their forthcoming album, "RVG" via YouTube. On 18 December 2012 the band's debut album, 'Til Death was released, which had been recorded at Chango Studios and produced and mixed by Cameron Mizell and mastered by Joey Sturgis. It appeared on three Billboard component charts Top Hard Rock (No. 21), Top Heatseekers (No. 7), and Top Independent Albums (No. 25).

=== Live Life and drop from Sumerian (2013–2014) ===
The band played the Vans Warped Tour UK. On 20 May the group streamed their new single, "Rebirth", from their proposed forthcoming EP, All Hype All Night.

On 30 October 2013, Sumerian Records announced that they had dropped Capture the Crown from their roster.

=== Label change, Reign of Terror (2014–2016) ===
In December 2013, Blake Ellis left the band Two days later the band released a picture announcing that Gus Farias of the band Volumes would be providing guest vocals on a song from their forthcoming EP. The band started a crowdfunded effort in order to retrieve the rights to their already recorded EP and record new album. On 9 April 2014, they were signed by Artery Recordings.

In June and July 2014 the band released three songs from their new album, Reign of Terror, which was released on 5 August and charted at number 86 on the Billboard 200 in the U.S. In October 2014 guitarists Jye Menzies & Kris Sheehan along with drummer Tyler March had also left the band. Mitch Rogers became the new guitarist, and in 2015, Joe Abikhair replaced Ryan Seritti on drums.

From March until April 2016, the group toured the United States with Slaves, Myka Relocate, Outline in Color and Conquer Divide.

=== Name change and Lost Control (2016–2019) ===
On 30 July 2016, the band released a new single, "The Lake", and then was on hiatus until August 2018, when they announced that they would be going on tour with MyChildren MyBride, Secrets, Earth Groans, and Half Hearted on MyChildren MyBride's Unbreakable 10th Anniversary Tour in October. On 12 July 2019 the band released a new song, "No Cure", and announced a new album titled Lost Control set for release on 16 August 2019.

== Band members ==
- Jeffrey Welfare – lead vocals (2010–2020)
- Manny Dominick – drums (2017–2020)
- Erik Vaughn Weatherford III – bass, backing vocals (2019–2020)

Past members

- Blake Ellis – rhythm guitar, bass (2010–2013)
- Jye Menzies – lead guitar (2010–2014)
- Kris Sheehan – bass (2010–2013), rhythm guitar (2010–2014)
- Tyler "Lone America" March – drums (2010–2014)
- Kyle Devaney – lead guitar (2014–2015)
- Ryan Seritti – drums (2014–2015)
- Joe Abikhair – drums (2015–2016)
- Alec Hoxsey – drums (2016)
- Mitch Rogers – rhythm guitar (2014–2016), lead guitar (2015–2016)
- Maurice Morfaw – bass (2014–2016)
- Robert Weston – bass (2017)
- Alex Maggard – lead guitar, rhythm guitar, backing vocals (2016–2018), bass (2017–2018)

== Discography ==
=== Studio albums ===
as Capture the Crown:

- 'Til Death (2012)
- Reign of Terror (2014)

as Capture:

- Lost Control (2019)

=== EPs ===
- Live Life (2014)

== Singles ==
- "You Call That a Knife? This Is a Knife!" (2011, 'Til Death)
- "Ladies & Gentlemen... I Give You Hell" (2011, 'Til Death)
- "#OIMATEWTF" (featuring Denis Shaforostov formerly of Make Me Famous) (2012, 'Til Death)
- "In My Head (Jason Derulo Cover)" (2012)
- "RVG" (2012, 'Til Death)
- "Rebearth" (featuring Tyler Smith of The Word Alive) (2013, Live Life)
- "Live Life" (featuring Gus Farias of Volumes) (2014, Live Life)
- "To Whom It May Concern" (2014, Reign Of Terror)
- "I Hate You" (2014, Reign Of Terror)
- "Make War, Not Love" (featuring Alex Koehler formerly of Chelsea Grin) (2014, Reign Of Terror)
- "The Lake" (2016, Lost Control)
- "Lost Control" (2017, Lost Control)
- "Dingbats" (2017, Lost Control)
- "No Cure" (2019, Lost Control)

== Videography ==
- "You Call That a Knife? This Is a Knife!" (2011, 'Til Death)
- "Ladies & Gentlemen... I Give You Hell" (2012, 'Til Death)
- "Bloodsuckers" (2014, Live Life)
- "Firestarter" (2014, Reign Of Terror)
- "Dingbats" (2017, Lost Control)
- "No Cure" (2019, Lost Control)

== See also ==
- Music of Sydney
