= Chris Fronzak =

American musician (born 1989)

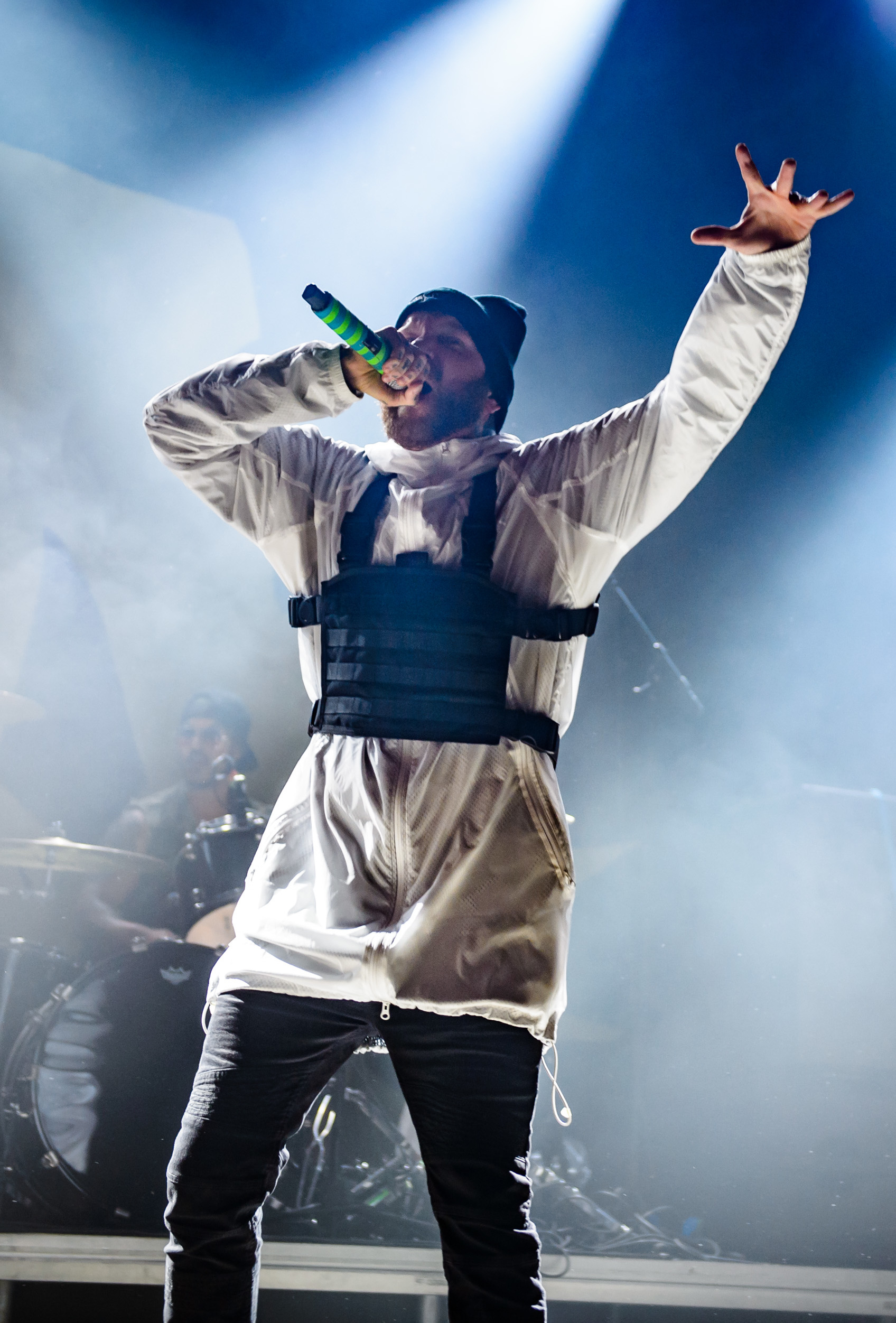
- Fronzak in 2018

Background information
- Also known as: Fronz; Fronzilla
- Born: Christopher Joseph Fronzak; November 20, 1989 (age 36); South Florida, U.S.
- Origin: Orlando, Florida, U.S.
- Genres: Metalcore; deathcore; nu metal; rap metal; hip-hop; crunkcore
- Occupations: Singer; rapper; songwriter; entrepreneur
- Years active: 2005–present
- Label: Stay Sick
- Member of: Attila; Bone Crew; Titans of Metal
- Website: fronzak.com

Christopher Joseph Fronzak (born November 20, 1989), also known as Fronz or Fronzilla, is an American musician who is best known as the lead vocalist and founding member of the metalcore/rap metal band Attila. Aside from his work in Attila, he is also the manager of record label Stay Sick Recordings and clothing line Stay Sick Threads.

== Career ==
=== Attila ===
Fronzak met Sean Heenan, Sam Halcomb, Matt Booth and Kris Wilson all in high school during his freshman year in Carrollton, Georgia, and formed his first band Attila, named in reference to Attila the Hun, which he came across in a book. Since 2007 with Fallacy, the band released seven records with two different record labels, Artery Recordings and SharpTone Records, before they decided to record as an unsigned band. As an independent band, they released their album, Villain, in 2019.

=== Bone Crew ===
Fronzak started a new side project named Bone Crew. He officially announced the project in July 2018. They released a self-titled album, which was released August 3, 2018, through Stay Sick Recordings. On April 27, 2019, Bone Crew performed live for the first time ever at So What Music Festival in Dallas.

=== Solo ===
In 2011, Fronzak was featured in the From the Embrace song "La Flama Blanca", which appeared on the band's The Grind EP. In 2012, Fronzak was featured in the In Dying Arms song "Bathed in Salt", which appeared on the band's album Boundaries, released in September 2012. He also featured in the song "Love, Sex, Riot" from Issues' debut EP Black Diamonds, which was released on November 13. Fronzak was also featured in the We Are the Blog! song "Shwash" in their EP Decadence. Fronzak featured in "Mimic" from Upon a Burning Body's 2012 album, Red. White. Green. He also featured in My City, My Secret's song "The Forefront" from their debut EP Dream Being. In 2013, Fronz was featured in Sleeping with Sirens song "The Best There Ever Was" off their third album, Feel. In 2017, he was featured in the Eskimo Callboy song "The Scene" off their album The Scene.

On December 11, 2013, it was announced that Fronzak would be heading into the studio in the following month to begin recording a hip-hop album. On April 1, 2014, he released his first song, entitled "Turn It Up", under the stage name Fronzilla as part of his hip-hop side project. Another single, "They Still Talk", was released in March 2015, along with the announcement of the album. The album, Party People's Anthem, was released on July 2, 2015, under Artery Recordings.

=== Stay Sick ===
On July 16, 2014, Fronzak launched the imprint label Stay Sick Recordings, created alongside Artery Recordings, and announced that the label had signed pop-punk band Old Again. The band has since signed metalcore outfit The Plot in You, deathcore band Enterprise Earth, electronicore band It Lives It Breathes, and post-hardcore/metalcore band Vesta Collide.

In July 2020, the label rebranded itself as Modern Empire Music. It's unclear whether or not Fronz has any involvement with the label following its rebrand.

== Personal life ==
Fronzak has two sons with his former girlfriend, born in 2014 and 2015. He shares one more son with his current spouse Hayes, born in 2022

Over the summer of 2020, it was confirmed that Fronzak had begun creating pornographic content for OnlyFans. He regularly collaborates with other adult stars in the space.

On Sept 4, 2023, Fronzak announced on Instagram and X (formerly known as Twitter), that he was running for President of the United States as a Libertarian.

== Controversies ==
Fronzak has been involved in a few controversial situations.

One of his biggest controversies regards Senses Fail's singer Buddy Nielsen. In 2014, Nielsen attacked Attila for the song "Proving Grounds", stating that it insulted the LGBT community. Fronzak replied to Nielsen, "If you think I'm homophobic in any way possible, you're clearly either an idiot or you're in a washed-up band that nobody cares about". During Warped Tour in 2015, Attila and Senses Fail toured together and Fronzak accused them of leaving a sign at the Attila merch table calling them "homophobes". Moreover, he accused Nielsen of spending every day on stage "to talk shit about Attila".

In April 2015, during a concert in Perth, Fronz was assaulted on stage. He eventually responded by retaliating against an innocent bystander and apologized.

A diss song entitled "Callout", which was released in 2013, featured numerous attacks against the likes of Jonny Craig, Ronnie Radke, Christofer Drew, and Mike Reynolds. On February 15, 2018, Attila self-released a sequel song titled "Callout 2" in which Fronz called out more than 50 people for different reasons, including Logan Paul, RiceGum, Bhad Bhabie, Harvey Weinstein, Offset, Martin Shkreli, Westboro, Buddy Nielsen, Jeffree Star, Danny Worsnop, Denis Stoff, Tim Lambesis, Frankie Palmeri, Conor McGregor, Kim Kardashian, Ronda Rousey, Tyler Carter, 6ix9ine. Fronzak eventually explained some days later the meaning behind the song.

On August 22, 2018, during a Las Vegas concert, he assaulted a nearby security guard by punching him in the back of the head and then throwing his microphone. According to Fronzak, his motive for the outburst was that the security were being too rough when handling audience members.

In June 2020, Fronzak was accused of sexual misconduct with an underage fan. Fronzak admitted to the encounter, claiming the fan lied about her age.

In March 2026, Fronzak made a homophobic comment about Beartooth frontman Caleb Shomo.

== Discography ==
=== Solo career ===
Studio albums

- Party People's Anthem (Artery Recordings, 2015)

=== With Attila ===
Studio albums

- Fallacy (self-released, 2007)
- Soundtrack to a Party (Statik Factory, 2008)
- Rage (Artery Recordings, 2010)
- Outlawed (Artery Recordings, 2011)
- About That Life (Artery Recordings, 2013)
- Guilty Pleasure (Artery Recordings, 2014)
- Chaos (SharpTone Records, 2016)
- Villain (self-released, 2019)
- Closure (self-released, 2021)
- Concrete Throne (self-released, 2026)

=== With Bone Crew ===
Studio albums

- Bone Crew (Stay Sick Recordings, 2018)
- Manifest (Modern Empire Music, 2020)
- THREE (Bone Crew Music, 2024)

== Collaborations ==
Year	Song	Album	Artist
2012	"The Dreamer" (featuring Fronz)	Misguided	Murder on Her Mind
2012	"Dominatrix" (featuring Fronz)	Forever the Loathing Son (EP)	Surroundings
2012	"Mimic" (featuring Fronz)	Red. White. Green.	Upon a Burning Body
2012	"Bathed in Salt" (featuring Fronz)	Boundaries	In Dying Arms
2012	"Love, Sex, Riot" (featuring Fronz)	Black Diamonds	Issues
2013	"The Best There Ever Was" (featuring Fronz)	Feel	Sleeping with Sirens
2013	"Step 4" (featuring Fronz)	And the Story Goes	A Scent Like Wolves
2013	"Maverick" (featuring Fronz)	(Single)	Listen for the Light
2013	"Safe" (featuring Fronz)	If You Really Want to Know	Light the Avenue
2013	"Looking for a Better Day" (featuring Fronz)	Resistance	Winds of Plague
2014	"Brazzers" (featuring Fronz)	Brazzers	Emberville
2014	"Crossfire" (featuring Fronz)	Reflections	Sink the Ship
2017	"The Scene" (featuring Fronz)	The Scene	Eskimo Callboy
2017	"Self-Ownership" (featuring Fronz)	Veracity	BackWordz
2018	"Better Now" (Post-Malone cover) (featuring Fronz, Tilian & Luke Holland)	(Single)	Our Last Night
2018	"Outer Haven" (featuring Fronzilla)	Stay Away	Notions
2018	"Demons" (featuring Fronz)	(Single)	The Curse Within
2018	"The Truth" (featuring Chris Fronzak)	(Single)	AVERA
2018	"Private Paradise" (featuring Chris Fronzak)	Arms	Annisokay
2018	"Hourglass" (featuring Chris Fronzak)	(Single)	Nhibitions
2019	"No Love" (featuring Fronz)	Coming Clean (EP)	Volumes
2019	"The Dirty Ones" (featuring Fronzilla)	(Single)	Dirty Machine
2019	"J's" (featuring Fronzilla)	(Single)	We Are the Flesh
2019	"RIP" (featuring Fronz)	The Heartless	Cabin Boy Jumped Ship
