= Artery Recordings =

American record label

- Parent company: Warner Music Group
- Founded: 2010
- Founder: Eric Rushing
- Status: Defunct
- Distributor: Alternative Distribution Alliance
- Genre: Metalcore, post-hardcore, hardcore punk
- Location: Sacramento, California, U.S.
- Official website: arteryrecordings.com

Artery Recordings was an American record label based in Sacramento, California, founded in 2010 as an imprint of Razor & Tie by Eric Rushing, owner of The Artery Foundation.

On August 31, 2017, it was announced that Artery was acquired by Warner Music Group.

== Former artists ==
- A Bullet for Pretty Boy (disbanded)
- Adestria (disbanded)
- Aethere (inactive)
- Afterlife (active, Hopeless Records)
- Altered Perceptions (inactive)
- American Standards (active)
- Attila (active, unsigned)
- Austrian Death Machine (active)
- BackWordz (active, unsigned)
- Bloodline (active, unsigned)
- Bodysnatcher (active, eOne Music)
- Broken Youth (active, unsigned)
- Built On Secrets (disbanded)
- Buried In Verona (disbanded)
- Bury Tomorrow (active, Music For Nations Records)
- Bury Your Dead (inactive)
- Capture (formerly known as Capture the Crown, inactive)
- Carcer City (disbanded)
- Casino Madrid (disbanded)
- Chelsea Grin (active, unsigned)
- Climates (disbanded)
- Close to Home (disbanded)
- Cold Black (hiatus)
- Concepts (active)
- Conquer Divide (active)
- The Crimson Armada (active, unsigned)
- Crystal Lake (active, SharpTone Records)
- Deadships (inactive)
- Dead Silence Hides My Cries (inactive)
- Dealer (active, Human Warfare)
- Distinguisher (active, unsigned)
- Dreamshade (unsigned)
- Dropout Kings (active, Suburban Noize Records)
- Early Seasons (disbanded)
- Empire (disbanded)
- Entheos (active, Spinefarm Records)
- Extortionist (active, unsigned)
- Falsifier (unsigned)
- For the Fallen Dreams (active, Arising Empire)
- For The Win (disbanded)
- Four Letter Lie (inactive)
- Gamma Sector (active, unsigned)
- Guillotines (active, unsigned)
- Heartaches (inactive)
- I Declare War (unsigned)
- Impulse
- In Dying Arms (active, unsigned)
- Incredible' Me (disbanded)
- Insvrgence (active, unsigned)
- Invisons (active, Lowlife Music)
- It Lives, It Breathes (active, unsigned)
- It Prevails (active, unsigned)
- Iwrestledabearonce (disbanded)
- Kissing Candice (active, independent)
- Kriminals (inactive)
- Kublai Khan (active, Rise Records)
- Meltdown (disbanded)
- Message to the Masses (active, unsigned)
- Mothersound (active, unsigned)
- Myka Relocate (disbanded)
- Notions (active, Phantom Gang)
- Old Again (disbanded)
- Old Lung (active, unsigned)
- On Broken Wings (active, unsigned)
- Pugtopsy (inactive)
- Redeem/Revive (inactive)
- Scars of Tomorrow (inactive)
- Sentinels (active, Sharptone Records)
- Set On End (inactive)
- Shamecult (inactive)
- Shoot the Girl First (inactive)
- Siamese (active, Long Branch Records)
- Silent Screams (active, Long Branch Records)
- Sirens and Sailors (active, unsigned)
- Slaves (Now "Rain City Drive") (active, Thriller Records)
- Sleeptalk (active, unsigned)
- Sleep Waker (disbanded)
- Spite (active, Rise Records)
- Spoken (active, unsigned)
- Steve Terreberry
- The Ansible (active, unsigned)
- Unlocking the Truth (disbanded)
- Upon This Dawning (disbanded)
- Vanna (disbanded)
- Vesta Collide (disbanded)
- Villain of the Story (active, Out of Line Music)
- We Are The Flesh (active, unsigned)
- Weeping Wound (active, unsigned)
- White Fox Society (disbanded)
- Wildways (active, Warner Music Russia)
- Years Since The Storm (disbanded)
