= Sleeping with Sirens discography =

Band discography

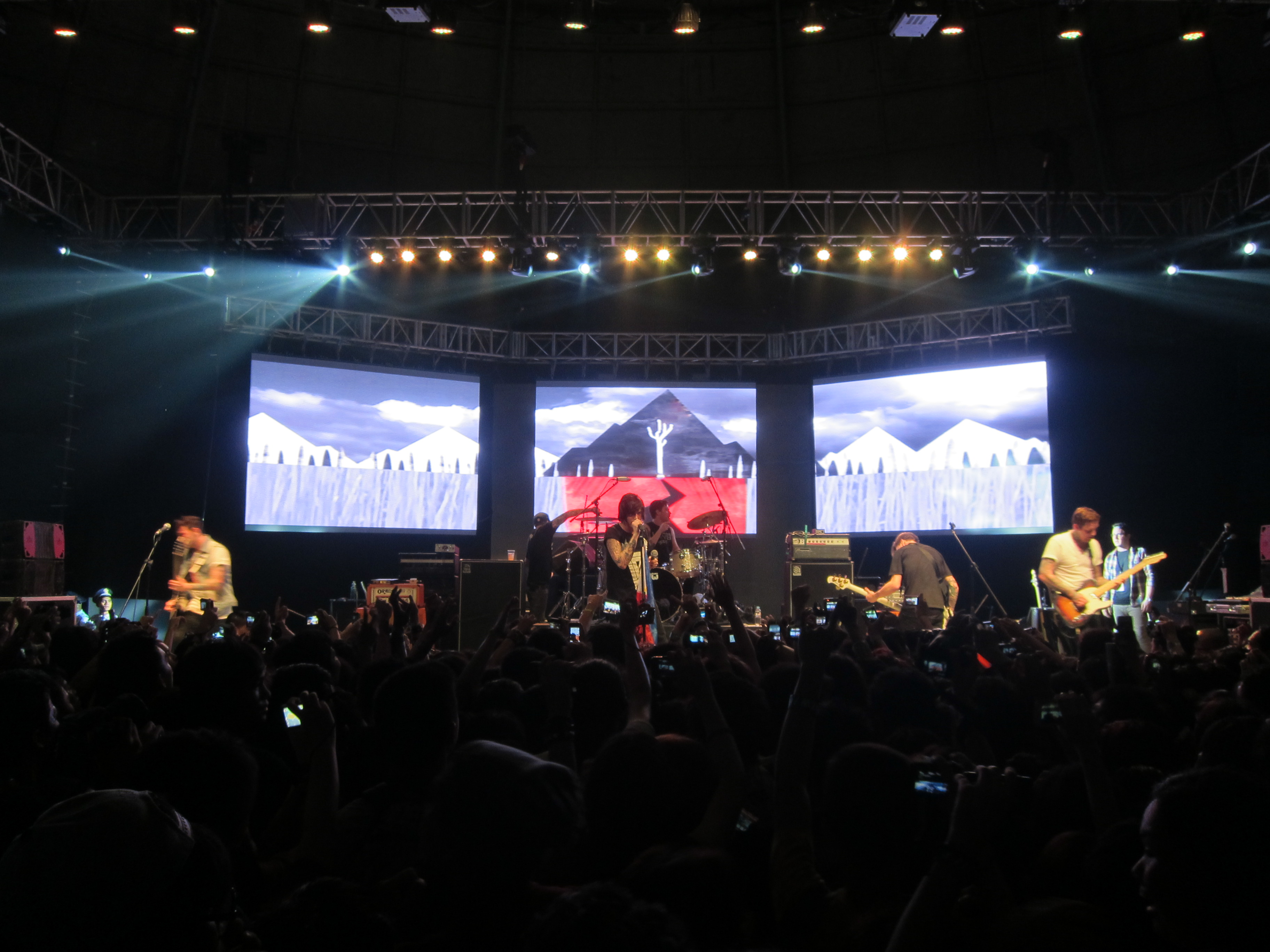
- Sleeping with Sirens performing at the SM City North EDSA Skydome in the Philippines, 2013
- Studio albums: 8
- EPs: 1
- Live albums: 1
- Compilation albums: 1
- Singles: 31
- Music videos: 16
- Compilation appearances: 3

American rock band Sleeping with Sirens has released eight studio albums, one extended play, one live album, one compilation album, 33 singles, and 16 music videos. The band was formed in 2009 by former members of For All We Know and Paddock Park and released their debut album, With Ears to See and Eyes to Hear, a year later. Its second single, "If I'm James Dean, You're Audrey Hepburn", generated increased interest in the band and would later be certified Gold by the Recording Industry Association of America. In 2013, the group achieved their first top-ten release when their third studio album, Feel, entered the Billboard 200 at number three.

Sleeping with Sirens has contributed to three multi-act compilation albums and vocalist Kellin Quinn has collaborated with numerous other artists as a featured performer, including multiple songs with Machine Gun Kelly. The group has sold over one million albums worldwide.

== Albums ==
=== Studio albums ===
List of studio albums, with selected chart positions and sales figures
Title	Album details	Peak chart positions										Sales	Certifications
Title	Album details	US	US Hard Rock	AUS	BEL	CAN	JPN	NL	SCO	UK	UK Rock	Sales	Certifications
With Ears to See and Eyes to Hear	Released: March 23, 2010; Label: Rise; Formats: CD, digital download	— (Note: With Ears to See and Eyes to Hear did not enter the US Billboard 200, but peaked at number 7 on the US Heatseekers Albums Chart.)	—	—	—	—	—	—	—	—	—	US: 25,000	
Let's Cheers to This	Released: May 10, 2011; Label: Rise; Formats: CD, digital download	78	5	—	—	—	—	—	—	—	—		RIAA: Gold
Feel	Released: June 4, 2013; Label: Rise; Formats: CD, digital download	3	2	14	—	—	—	—	38	36	3	US: 180,000	
Madness	Released: March 17, 2015; Label: Epitaph; Formats: CD, digital download	13	1	13	122	23	159	83	33	26	1	US: 79,200	
Gossip	Released: September 22, 2017; Label: Warner Bros.; Formats: CD, digital download	38	— (Note: Gossip did not enter the Top Hard Rock Albums chart, but peaked at number six on the Top Rock Albums chart.)	64	133	—	—	—	—	— (Note: Gossip did not enter the UK Albums Chart, but peaked at number 43 on the UK Album Downloads Chart.)	14		
How It Feels to Be Lost	Released: September 6, 2019; Label: Sumerian; Formats: CD, digital download	92	4	— (Note: How It Feels to Be Lost did not enter the ARIA Albums Chart, but peaked at number 16 on the ARIA Digital Album Chart.)	—	—	—	—	84	— (Note: How It Feels to Be Lost did not enter the UK Albums Chart, but peaked at number 36 on the UK Album Downloads Chart.)	4		
Complete Collapse	Released: October 14, 2022; Label: Sumerian; Formats: streaming	— (Note: Complete Collapse did not enter the Billboard 200, but peaked at number 53 on the US Billboard Top Current Albums component chart.)	—	—	—	—	—	—	—	—	25		
An Ending in Itself	Released: June 12, 2026; Label: Rise; Format: CD, LP, streaming	—	20	62	—	—	—	—	—	—	—		
"—" denotes a release that did not chart.

=== Live albums ===
List of live albums, with selected chart positions and sales figures
Title	Album details	Peak chart positions			
Title	Album details	US	US Indie	US Rock	US Alt.
Live and Unplugged	Released: April 8, 2016; Label: Epitaph; Formats: CD, digital download	174	14	26	19

=== Compilation albums ===
List of compilation albums, with selected release details
Title	Album details
The Rise Years	Released: March 31, 2016; Label: Rise; Formats: Vinyl

== Extended plays ==
List of extended plays, with selected chart positions
Title	Album details	Peak chart positions					
Title	Album details	US	US Indie	US Rock	US Hard Rock	AUS Hit	CAN Alt
If You Were a Movie, This Would Be Your Soundtrack	Released: June 26, 2012; Label: Rise; Formats: CD, digital download	17	4	6	4	11	42

== Singles ==
List of singles, with selected chart positions and certifications
Title	Year	Peak chart positions						Sales	Certifications	Album
Title	Year	US Bub.	US Dig.	US Alt.	US Main.	US Rock	UK Rock	Sales	Certifications	Album
"You Kill Me (In a Good Way)"	2010	—	—	—	—	—	—			With Ears to See and Eyes to Hear
"If I'm James Dean, You're Audrey Hepburn"	2010	—	—	—	—	—	—		RIAA: Platinum	With Ears to See and Eyes to Hear
"With Ears to See, and Eyes to Hear"	2010	—	—	—	—	—	—			With Ears to See and Eyes to Hear
"Do It Now Remember It Later"	2011	—	—	—	—	—	—			Let's Cheers to This
"Fire"	2011	—	—	—	—	—	—			Let's Cheers to This
"If You Can't Hang"	2011	—	—	—	—	— (Note: "If You Can't Hang" did not enter the Hot Rock Songs chart, but peaked at number 23 on the Hard Rock Digital Song Sales chart.)	—		RIAA: 2× Platinum; BPI: Silver	Let's Cheers to This
"A Trophy Father's Trophy Son"	2011	—	—	—	—	—	—		RIAA: Gold	Let's Cheers to This
"Stomach Tied In Knots"	2012	—	—	—	—	—	—			If You Were a Movie, This Would Be Your Soundtrack
"Roger Rabbit"	2012	—	—	—	—	—	—		RIAA: Gold	If You Were a Movie, This Would Be Your Soundtrack
"Don't You Ever Forget About Me"	2012	—	—	—	—	—	—			If You Were a Movie, This Would Be Your Soundtrack
"Dead Walker Texas Ranger"	2012	—	—	—	—	— (Note: "Dead Walker Texas Ranger" did not enter the Hot Rock Songs chart, but peaked at number 35 on the Rock Digital Song Sales chart.)	19			Non-album single
"Low"	2013	7	123	— (Note: "Low" did not enter the Alternative Airplay chart, but peaked at number 11 on the Alternative Digital Song Sales component chart.)	—	17	7	US: 16,583		Feel
"Alone" (featuring MGK)	2013	—	—	— (Note: "Alone" did not enter the Alternative Airplay chart, but peaked at number 14 on the Alternative Digital Song Sales component chart.)	—	23	21			Feel
"Congratulations" (featuring Matty Mullins)	2013	—	—	—	—	—	—			Feel
"Kick Me"	2014	—	—	— (Note: "Kick Me" did not enter the Alternative Airplay chart, but peaked at number 12 on the Alternative Digital Song Sales component chart.)	—	23	10			Madness
"Go Go Go"	2015	—	—	—	—	—	—			Madness
"Better Off Dead"	2015	—	—	—	—	—	—			Madness
"Legends"	2017	—	—	18	—	— (Note: "Legends" did not enter the Hot Rock & Alternative Songs chart, but peaked at number 25 on the Rock & Alternative Airplay component chart.)	—			Gossip
"Empire to Ashes"	2017	—	—	— (Note: "Empire to Ashes" did not enter the Alternative Airplay chart, but peaked at number 25 on the Alternative Digital Song Sales component chart.)	—	— (Note: "Empire to Ashes" did not enter the Hot Rock Songs chart, but peaked at number 7 on the Hard Rock Digital Song Sales chart.)	—			Gossip
"Cheers"	2017	—	—	—	—	—	—			Gossip
"Trouble"	2017	—	—	—	—	—	—			Gossip
"Christmas on the Road"	2017	—	—	—	—	—	—			Non-album single
"Leave It All Behind"	2019	—	—	—	—	—	—			How It Feels to Be Lost
"Break Me Down"	2019	—	—	—	—	—	—			How It Feels to Be Lost
"Agree to Disagree"	2019	—	—	—	33	—	—			How It Feels to Be Lost
"How It Feels to Be Lost"	2019	—	—	—	—	—	—			How It Feels to Be Lost
"Talking to Myself"	2020	—	—	—	—	—	—			How It Feels to Be Lost
"Bloody Knuckles"	2021	—	—	—	—	—	—			Complete Collapse
"Crosses" (featuring Spencer Chamberlain)	2022	—	—	—	—	—	—			Complete Collapse
"Let You Down" (featuring Charlotte Sands)	2022	—	—	—	—	—	—			Complete Collapse
"Ctrl + Alt + Del"	2022	—	—	—	—	—	—			Complete Collapse
"Complete Collapse"	2022	—	—	—	33	—	—			Complete Collapse
"An Ending in Itself"	2026	—	—	—	—	—	—			An Ending in Itself
"Forever Always"	2026	—	—	—	—	—	—			An Ending in Itself
"Paralyzed"	2026	—	—	—	—	—	—			An Ending in Itself
"House Of Matches"	2026	—	—	—	—	—	—			An Ending in Itself
"—" denotes a release that did not chart.

=== Promotional singles ===
List of promotional singles, with selected chart positions
Title	Year	Peak chart positions	Album
Title	Year	US Hard Rock Dig.	Album
"The Best There Ever Was"	2013	—	Feel
"Free Now"	2013	—	Feel
"Congratulations"	2013	—	Feel
"We Like It Loud"	2015	—	Madness
"Fly"	2015	13	Madness
"Gold"	2015	—	Madness
"Save Me a Spark"	2015	—	Madness
"—" denotes a release that did not chart.

=== Other certified songs ===
Title	Year	Certifications	Album
"Scene One - James Dean & Audrey Hepburn"	2012	RIAA: Gold	If You Were a Movie, This Would Be Your Soundtrack
"Scene Two: Roger Rabbit"	2012	RIAA: Gold	If You Were a Movie, This Would Be Your Soundtrack

== Other appearances ==
- Punk Goes Pop Volume 4 with "Fuck You" (CeeLo Green cover)
- Warped Tour 2012 with "Tally It Up: Settle the Score"
- Warped Tour 2013 with "Do It Now Remember It Later"
- This Is Your Sign (Part 1) with "Never Ending Nightmare"; collaboration with Citizen Soldier

== Music videos ==
Year	Title	Director(s)
2009	"If I'm James Dean, You're Audrey Hepburn"	Caleb Mallery
2010	"With Ears to See and Eyes to Hear"	Sam Link
2011	"If You Can't Hang"	Thunder Down Country
2012	"Do It Now Remember It Later"	Izzy Campos
2012	"Roger Rabbit"	Drew Russ
2013	"Alone" (featuring MGK)	Sitcom Soldiers
2013	"Congratulations" (featuring Matty Mullins)	Drew Russ
2014	"Kick Me"	Sitcom Soldiers
2015	"Go Go Go"	Sean Garcia
2015	"The Strays"	Sitcom Soldiers
2015	"Better Off Dead"	Sitcom Soldiers
2016	"Gold"	
2017	"Legends"	Erik Rojas and Joe Mischo
2019	"Leave It All Behind"	Sitcom Soldiers
2019	"Agree to Disagree"	
2019	"How It Feels to Be Lost"	Frankie Nasso
2022	"Crosses" (featuring Spencer Chamberlain)	
2022	"Let You Down" (featuring Charlotte Sands)	
2022	"Complete Collapse"	Brian Cox
2026	"An Ending In Itself"	
2026	"Forever Always"	
2026	"House of Matches"	Max Moore
