= Live and Unplugged =

Live album by Sleeping with Sirens
- Released: April 8, 2016
- Recorded: June 22, 2015
- Venues: The Social, Orlando, FL
- Length: 45:36
- Label: Epitaph
- Producer: Cameron Mizell

Sleeping with Sirens chronology
Madness (2015)	Live and Unplugged (2016)	Gossip (2017)

Singles from Live and Unplugged
- 1. "Gold" Released: February 12, 2016

Live and Unplugged is the debut live album and second acoustic release by American rock band Sleeping with Sirens. It was released on April 8, 2016 worldwide by Epitaph. The lead single, a different version of "Gold", a track from the band's previous album, Madness (2015), was released on February 12, 2016.

== Background and recording ==
The band's fourth studio album, Madness, was followed with a world tour with Pierce the Veil. After which, the band embarked on an acoustic tour, named We Like It Quiet (a reference to the song "We Like It Loud" from the group's previous album) with a sound similar to the band's first acoustic endeavour, If You Were a Movie, This Would Be Your Soundtrack. However, the two releases differed in that Live and Unplugged made use of more than just acoustic guitars, and has more of an alternative rock sound than the soft rock of the former.

The lead single was released via Twitter and gave fans a taste of how the album would sound. In an interview with Kerrang!, Kellin Quinn announced that it would be different due to the fact that the group's 'live dynamic is very different (in a good way) compared to [the band's] studio sound'.

== Release and reception ==
The album was met with critical acclaim. Hit the Floor gave it an almost perfect 9/10 rating, stating 'Sleeping With Sirens did a phenomenal job at keeping their tracks fun and fresh in their acoustic, unplugged state'.

It charted at number four on the UK Rock Charts.

== Track listing ==
No.	Title	Original album	Length
1.	"With Ears to See, and Eyes to Hear"	With Ears to See and Eyes to Hear	4:19
2.	"If I'm James Dean, You're Audrey Hepburn"	With Ears to See and Eyes to Hear	3:58
3.	"Gold"	Madness	4:11
4.	"The Strays"	Madness	3:00
5.	"Free Now"	Feel	4:18
6.	"Who Are You Now"	Let's Cheers to This	4:51
7.	"Go Go Go"	Madness	3:42
8.	"Santeria (Sublime cover)"	Sublime	3:32
9.	"Save Me a Spark"	Madness	3:55
10.	"Iris (Goo Goo Dolls cover)"	Dizzy Up the Girl	4:03
11.	"If You Can't Hang"	Let's Cheers to This	6:16

== Charts ==
Chart performance for Live and Unplugged
Chart (2016)	Peak position
Belgian Albums (Ultratop Flanders)	165
US Billboard 200	174
US Top Alternative Albums (Billboard)	19
US Independent Albums (Billboard)	14
US Top Rock Albums (Billboard)	26
