= Kick Me =

Kick Me may refer to:

- Kick Me (film), 1975
- Kick Me (song) by Sleeping With Sirens, 2014
