= Go Go Go (Sleeping with Sirens song) =

Single by Sleeping with Sirens

from the album Madness
- Released: January 22, 2015
- Recorded: Summer 2014
- Genre: Pop-punk
- Length: 2:47
- Label: Epitaph
- Songwriters: Kellin Quinn; John Feldmann; Simon Wilcox; Jack Fowler
- Producer: John Feldmann

Sleeping with Sirens singles chronology
"Kick Me" (2014)	"Go Go Go" (2015)	"The Strays" (2015)

"Go Go Go" is a song performed by American rock band Sleeping with Sirens released for digital download on January 22, 2015. It serves as the second single off of the group's fourth studio album, Madness, which was released on March 13, 2015, via Epitaph Records and follows up the album's lead single, "Kick Me". The music video for "Go Go Go" was self-directed by Sleeping With Sirens and shot by Sean Garcia of Flippen Music, which premiered on the single's release day.

== Background ==
"Go Go Go" was recorded in the summer of 2014 and was produced by John Feldmann and Sleeping with Sirens. The band first performed the song the day following its release, on Friday, January 23, 2015, at Viejas Arena in San Diego, California, on the World Tour with co-headliners Pierce the Veil. The song was released on January 22, 2015, as part of a pre-order campaign for its parent album, Madness.

According to Jon Caramanica and Nate Chinen of The New York Times, the lyrical themes of "Go Go Go" are about a reckless relationship. Musically, they described it as "...burst[ing] with zooming guitars and vocals processed until they gleam."

== Track listing ==
No.	Title	Length
1.	"Go Go Go"	2:47
Total length:		2:47

== Release history ==
Country	Date	Format
United States	January 22, 2015	Digital download
