= Empire to Ashes =

Single by Sleeping with Sirens

from the album Gossip
- Released: August 4, 2017
- Length: 3:17
- Label: Warner Bros.
- Songwriters: David Bendeth; Jacob Scherer; Stevie Aiello; Kellin Quinn
- Producer: Bendeth

Sleeping with Sirens singles chronology
"Legends" (2017)	"Empire to Ashes" (2017)	"Cheers" (2017)

"Empire to Ashes" is a song by American rock band Sleeping with Sirens. The song was released on August 4, 2017, as the second single from their fifth studio album, Gossip.

== Background ==
"Empire to Ashes" is about "breaking free of complacency and not being satisfied with the humdrum life." The track was written by David Bendeth, Jacob Scherer, Stevie Aiello and Kellin Quinn, while production was handled by Bendeth. The song has been described as "dark in both sound and lyrical content," which is the theme of their fifth studio album, Gossip. A lyrics video for the track was released on August 4, 2017.

== Reception ==
Chad Childers of Loudwire stated, "An underplayed opening verse starts to build in intensity toward a more anthemic sound, before letting it fall back down and starting it up once more." Maggie Dickman of Alternative Press described the track as "catchy as you'd expect it'd be."

== Personnel ==
Credits for "Empire to Ashes" adapted from album's liner notes.

Sleeping with Sirens

- Kellin Quinn – vocals
- Gabe Barham – drums
- Justin Hills – bass guitar
- Jack Fowler – lead guitar
- Nick Martin – rhythm guitar

Additional musicians

- Doug Allen – keyboards

Production

- David Bendeth – producer, mixing
- Ted Jensen – mastering
- Brian Robbins – programming,
- Jeremy Gillespie – engineering
- Jaran Sorenson – engineering
- Dustin Richardson – engineering
- Doug Allen – engineering

== Charts ==
Chart performance for "Empire to Ashes"
Chart (2017)	Peak position
US Alternative Digital Song Sales (Billboard)	25
US Hard Rock Digital Song Sales (Billboard)	7

== Release history ==
Release history and formats for "Empire to Ashes"
Region	Date	Format	Label	Ref.
Various	August 4, 2017	Digital download; streaming	Warner Bros.	
