= Live Unplugged =

Live Unplugged may refer to:

- Live Unplugged (Smilers album), 2005
- Live Unplugged (Jeremy Camp album), 2005

== See also ==
- Live & Unplugged, a 2010 EP by Sick Puppies
- Live and Unplugged, a 2016 album by Sleeping with Sirens
