= Gossip (Sleeping with Sirens album) =

Studio album by Sleeping with Sirens
- Released: September 22, 2017
- Recorded: March 2016 – April 2017
- Genres: Pop rock; indie rock; emo-pop
- Length: 37:17
- Label: Warner Bros.
- Producer: David Bendeth

Sleeping with Sirens chronology
Live and Unplugged (2016)	Gossip (2017)	How It Feels to Be Lost (2019)

Singles from Gossip
- 1. "Legends" Released: July 14, 2017; 2. "Empire to Ashes" Released: August 4, 2017; 3. "Cheers" Released: August 25, 2017; 4. "Trouble" Released: September 5, 2017

Professional ratings
Aggregate scores
Source	Rating
Metacritic	74/100
Review scores
Source	Rating
AllMusic	3.5/5 stars
Alternative Press	4/5 stars
Kerrang!	3/5 stars
Rock Sound	8/10

Gossip is the fifth studio album by American rock band Sleeping with Sirens. The album was released on September 22, 2017, through Warner Bros. Records and follows the band's fourth studio album Madness (2015). It is the first release since the band's departure from Epitaph Records. The lead single, "Legends", was released on July 14, 2017.

== Sound and influence ==
Instrumentally, Sleeping with Sirens have strived toward a more pop-influenced sound and have departed from their post-hardcore style seen in the band's previous studio albums. In an interview with radio station 106.7 KROQ, Kellin Quinn spoke about the album's recording sessions. "Legends is one of the first songs that clicked when we started writing this record," recalls Quinn. "We started coming up with the music and it had such an epic sound to it. The hook kinda just came to me. I was thinking about everything we've been through as a band and the road that we’re trying to travel – and everything that you want to try to do in your life simply as a human being – the lyric, 'We could be legends after all' is something that makes a lot of sense because nothing's guaranteed in life but if you put forth the work and the effort and you try as hard as you can and you follow your dreams then maybe you can make something really awesome happen with your life. That's basically the idea behind the song."

== Release and promotion ==
On July 6, 2017, the group teased the word "gossip". On July 13, Gossip was announced for release in September. In addition, a lyric video was released for "Legends". "Legends" was released as a single on July 14, accompanied with its music video. It was revealed on the same day that "Legends" will be used as Team USA's official anthem for the 2018 Olympic and Paralympic Winter Games in Pyeongchang, Korea. "Empire to Ashes" and "Cheers" were made available for streaming, respectively, on August 3 and August 25. Between August and October, the group embarked on the Gossip tour with support from the White Noise, Palaye Royale and Chase Atlantic. Following a premier on Beats 1, "Trouble" was made available for streaming on September 5.

On September 18, a music video was released for "Legends", which consisted of fan-submitted footage. In December, the group went on a tour of the US. Guitarist Nick Martin didn't join the band on the tour due to a family emergency. In January and February 2018, the group are set to go on a headlining US tour with support from Set It Off and The Gospel Youth. In April, the group are set to go on a headlining tour in Australia and New Zealand with support from Chase Atlantic, Lower Than Atlantis and the Faim. In July and August, the group went on the Chill Out Summer Acoustic Tour, with support from the Rocket Summer and Kulick. Following this, they embarked on a brief tour in Latin America. In October and November, the group supported Good Charlotte on their headlining US tour.

== Track listing ==
No.	Title	Writer(s)	Length
1.	"Gossip"	Kellin Quinn; David Bendeth; Stevie Aiello	3:16
2.	"Empire to Ashes"	Quinn; Bendeth; Stevie Aiello; Jacob Scherer	3:17
3.	"Legends"	Quinn; Bendeth; Aiello	3:43
4.	"Trouble"	Quinn; Bendeth; Aiello	3:18
5.	"One Man Army"	Quinn; Kristian "Boots" Ottestad; Howard K Fleetwood	3:19
6.	"Cheers"	Quinn; Jason Merris Bell	2:48
7.	"Closer"	Quinn; Paul James Freeman	3:36
8.	"Hole in My Heart"	Quinn; Bendeth; Aiello	3:34
9.	"I Need to Know"	Quinn; Bendeth; Joel Madden; Andrew Watt	3:38
10.	"The Chase"	Quinn; Jacob Scherer	2:59
11.	"War"	Quinn; Bendeth; Nick Martin	3:52
Total length:			37:17

Bonus tracks
No.	Title	Writer(s)	Length
12.	"Broken Mirrors"	Quinn; Aiello; Benji Madden; J. Madden	3:14
13.	"My Life"	Quinn; Aiello	3:04
Total length:			43:32

== Personnel ==
Sleeping with Sirens

- Kellin Quinn – lead vocals, keyboards
- Jack Fowler – lead guitar, programming
- Nick Martin – rhythm guitar, backing vocals
- Justin Hills – bass guitar, backing vocals
- Gabe Barham – drums, percussion

Additional personnel

- Dustin Richardson – assistant engineer
- Jeremy Gillespie – assistant engineer
- Alex Howard – backing vocals, harmonies, keys
- Stevie Aiello – programming
- Doug Allen – keyboards, programming
- Myles Bendeth – keyboards, programming on "Cheers"
- Adam Tindill – keyboards, programming on "Cheers"
- Jaran Sorenson – engineer
- Ted Jensen – mastering
- Chris Lord-Alge – mixing on "Legends"
- Brian Robbins – mix engineer, programming, recording engineer
- David Bendeth – producer, mixing except "Legends"

== Charts ==
Chart (2017)	Peak position
Australian Albums (ARIA)	64
Belgian Albums (Ultratop Flanders)	133
UK Album Downloads (Official Charts)	43
US Billboard 200	38
