= The Art of Fiction =

The Art of Fiction may refer to:

- "The Art of Fiction", an essay by Henry James, published in his 1888 book Partial Portraits
- The Art of Fiction, a 1983 book by John Gardner
- The Art of Fiction, a 1992 book by David Lodge
- The Art of Fiction: A Guide for Writers and Readers, a 2000 posthumous book by Ayn Rand
- The Art of Fiction, a 2006 album by Jeremy Warmsley
- The Art of Fiction, a 2011 album by Avion Roe
