= An Ending in Itself =

Studio album by Sleeping with Sirens
- Released: June 12, 2026
- Recorded: August 2024–2025
- Studios: Studio 4 Recording (Conshohocken, Pennsylvania); Stereo Creature (Medford, Oregon)
- Genres: Post-hardcore; metalcore
- Length: 44:59
- Label: Rise
- Producer: Will Yip

Sleeping with Sirens chronology
Complete Collapse (2022)	An Ending in Itself (2026)

Singles from An Ending in Itself
- 1. "An Ending in Itself" Released: March 19, 2026; 2. "Forever / Always" Released: April 24, 2026; 3. "Paralyzed" Released: May 22, 2026; 4. "House of Matches" Released: June 12, 2026

An Ending in Itself is the eighth studio album by American rock band Sleeping with Sirens. It was produced by Will Yip and released on June 12, 2026, through Rise Records, marking the band’s return to the label after departing with Sumerian Records. It serves as a follow-up to their seventh studio album, Complete Collapse (2022). It is also their first album to feature guitarist Tony Pizzuti of The Word Alive who replaced longtime guitarist Jack Fowler.

== Promotion ==
On March 19, 2026, the band released a new single "An Ending in Itself", which had been announced two days prior. A music video was released alongside it.

On April 24, 2026, the band released another new single titled "Forever/Always", along with a music video. Alongside this, they announced their upcoming eighth studio album, An Ending in Itself, set to be released June 12, 2026.

On May 22, 2026, a third single was released, titled "Paralyzed".

On June 12, 2026, releasing simultaneously with the new album, was a fourth single, "House of Matches". It was released alongside a music video.

== Touring ==
The band will tour North America in October and November 2026 in support of the new album. The tour will feature Rain City Drive and Shyeye as support. The band will also be touring in Latin America, Europe and the UK, Australia & Asia from December 2026 to April 2027.

== Track listing ==
All lyrics are written by Kellin Quinn; all music is composed by Will Yip and members of Sleeping with Sirens, except where noted.

No.	Title	Music	Length
1.	"An Ending in Itself"	Kellin Quinn; Justin Hills; Nick Martin; Matty Best; Will Yip	3:37
2.	"Forever / Always"	Quinn; Matt Good	3:43
3.	"God in My Head"		3:59
4.	"Need You Here"		4:07
5.	"Left on Repeat"	Quinn; Tony Pizzuti	3:25
6.	"House of Matches"	Quinn; Jon Lundin	3:01
7.	"Waiting for You"	Quinn; Lundin	4:02
8.	"Paralyzed"	Quinn; Lundin	3:12
9.	"Process"		4:30
10.	"PTSD"	Quinn; Hills; Martin; Best; Yip	2:26
11.	"Looking Back at Me"		5:18
12.	"Storm Clouds"	Quinn; Pizzuti	3:39
Total length:			44:59

== Personnel ==
Personnel adapted from the booklet.

Sleeping with Sirens

- Kellin Quinn – lead vocals
- Justin Hills – bass guitar
- Nick Martin – rhythm guitar, backing vocals
- Matty Best – drums, percussion
- Tony Pizzuti – lead guitar

Additional personnel

- Kitten Kuroi – additional vocals on "God in My Head"

Production

- Will Yip – producer
- Josh Fernandez – assistant engineer
- Justin Bartlett – assistant engineer
- Matt Good – mixing
- Ted Jensen – mastering (Note: Vinyl editions of the album have Chris Athens credited as the mastering engineer.)
- Levi Jaymes – album artwork
- Travis Shinn – photography
