= Jesse Lawson (musician) =

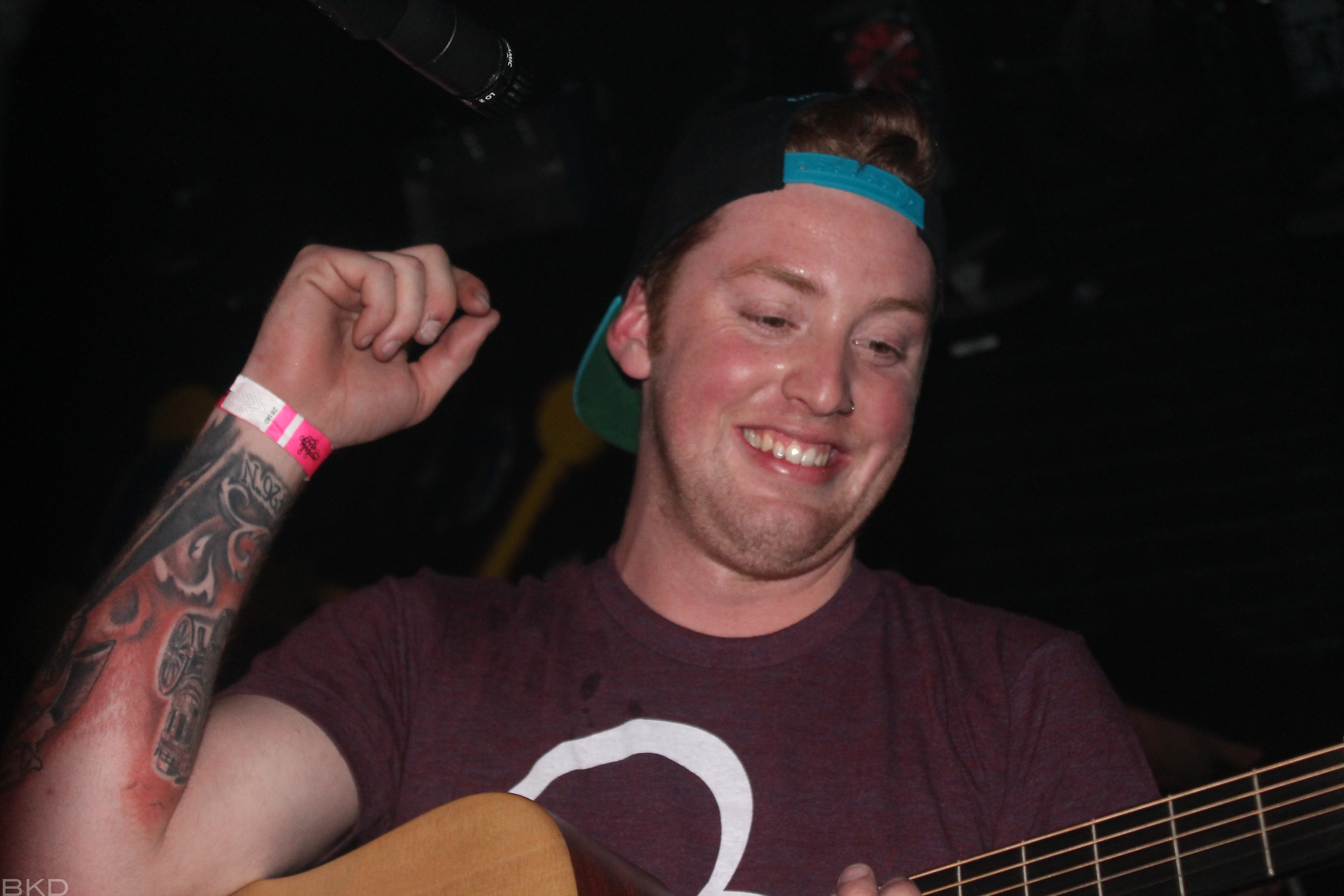
- Jesse Lawson performing with Sleeping with Sirens, 2012.

Background information
- Born: Jesse Estill Lawson; June 8, 1989 (age 37); California
- Genres: Post-hardcore; pop-punk; alternative rock; emo; pop rock; screamo; metalcore
- Occupation: Musician
- Instruments: Guitar; vocals
- Years active: 2010–present
- Formerly of: Sleeping with Sirens

Jesse Estill Lawson is an American musician. He is known for being the former rhythm guitarist and backing vocalist of the post-hardcore band Sleeping with Sirens.

He became best known for his work as the guitarist for the post-hardcore band Sleeping with Sirens, with whom he was active between 2010 and 2013.

== Career ==
In 2010, Lawson joined the American band Sleeping with Sirens. With the group, he released the albums Let's Cheers to This (2011) and Feel (2013), both of which charted on the US charts. Together with vocalist Kellin Quinn, he released acoustic versions of various band songs on YouTube. Due to the overwhelming response from fans, the group eventually recorded the acoustic EP If You Were a Movie, This Would Be Your Soundtrack, which was released in 2012.

With the group, he toured extensively throughout Europe and North America, as well as Southeast Asia and Australia. On October 16, 2013, Lawson announced that he was parting ways with the band. He cited personal reasons for his decision. In a subsequent interview in October 2015, Lawson explained that he could no longer identify with his work in Sleeping with Sirens. He also cited jealousy as a reason for his departure, though he simultaneously stated that he maintains a friendly relationship with the band's musicians.

On March 3, 2014, Jesse Lawson launched a crowdfunding campaign on Indiegogo to fund his debut EP, titled *Chapter II*, which was produced without the assistance of a record label. The EP was released on May 20, 2014. In August 2014, Lawson signed a contract with the artist management company The Artery Foundation. In March 2015, he performed as a solo artist for the first time at South by So What? In Grand Prairie, Texas.

Following the release of three standalone singles—Somewhere in Maui, I Got Lost, and Tall Trees and Long Drives—he released his debut album, Projections, in July 2015.

== Personal life ==
Jesse Lawson has been married since 2012 and has one child. He proposed to his then-girlfriend, Ashley, during the band's set at the Warped Tour in Portland, Oregon.

He is a fan of Ryan Adams and also listens to hip-hop and R&B. Lawson cites Biggie and Tupac among his favorite artists.

== Discography ==
=== With Sleeping with Sirens ===
- 2011: Let's Cheers to This (Rise Records)
- 2012: If You Were a Movie, This Would Be Your Soundtrack (Rise Records)
- 2013: Feel (Rise Records)

=== Solo ===
- 2014: Chapter II (Crowdfunding, May 20, 2014, EP)
- 2015: Somewhere in Maui (Single)
- 2015: I Got Lost (Single)
- 2015: Tall Trees and Long Drives (Single)
- 2015: Projection (Album)
