= Avion Roe =

American rock band

- Origin: Dallas, Texas
- Genres: Emo, emo pop, post-hardcore, pop rock
- Years active: 2011–2019
- Label: Epitaph Records
- Spinoff of: Red Car Wire
- Past members: Evan Couture; Jordan Modro; Sean Humphrey; Josh Cutlip
- Website: www.avionroe.com

Avion Roe was an American rock band from Dallas, Texas formed in 2011.

They have released two full-length albums, The Art of Fiction and In Separation, as well as two EPs, Into The Rest and Unreleased.

== History and formation ==
Avion Roe formed in 2011 by frontman Evan Couture and drummer Josh Cutlip after the disbanding of Red Car Wire (Universal Records) which they were in together. After adding their friends Sean Humphrey and Jordan Modro to the mix, the band knew this was the final lineup. Here on January 4, 2011 in Dallas, Texas, Avion Roe was formed.

Avion Roe were the first independent artist to release a 3D Music Video. The video was recorded for their song called 'The Escape'. It was released on October 1, 2013.

=== The Art of Fiction (2011–14) ===
Avion Roe's debut album, The Art of Fiction, was released on May 3, 2011, which only took four months to make after the band formed in early January the same year. The album has an emo, emo pop and post-hardcore sound to it such as bands like Escape the Fate, Taking Back Sunday and The Used.

=== Into The Rest and In Separation (2015–present) ===
Avion Roe released "Into The Rest - Single" which features Kellin Quinn of Sleeping with Sirens on September 25, 2015. The same day they announced their signing to Epitaph Records On October, 16th they released their debut EP on Epitaph Records, Into The Rest. They announced that they would be part of Vans Warped Tour in 2016, playing dates 6/24-7/21. They released In Separation, their debut full-length on Epitaph Records on June 17, 2016.

=== Forza Horizon 3 ===
The band announced via Twitter that their song 'This Loneliness' would be featured in the video game Forza Horizon 3, for Xbox ONE and PC.

== Tours/Festivals ==
=== 2011 ===
- Vans Warped Tour 2011
- The Wake Up Tour, w/ Me Talk Pretty, Madina Lake (Winter 2011)

=== 2012 ===
- Vans Warped Tour 2012

=== 2013 ===
- Vans Warped Tour 2013 (Dallas)
- South by So What?! (October 26)

=== 2014 ===
- South by So What?! (March 14)

=== 2016 ===
- 10 Years of Don't You Fake It tour w/ Red Jumpsuit Apparatus (4 shows)
- The "We're All In Danger Tour" w/ Dangerkids
- Vans Warped Tour 2016
- SLAVES Tour w/ SLAVES, Outline in Color
- Reunion Shows w/ Acceptance
- So What Fest! (October 21)
- All Roads Lead Home Tour w/ Assuming We Survive

=== 2017 ===
- Metro Station:10 Year Anniversary Tour

== Discography ==
=== Studio albums ===
- The Art of Fiction (2011, self-released)
- In Separation (2016, Epitaph Records)

=== Extended plays ===
- Into the Rest (2015, Epitaph Records)
- Unreleased (2021, Rest of Eternity)

=== Compilations ===
- Music Saves Lives sampler- "Skin Deep (Adderall)"
- Beyond [THE] Blue Vol.5 (Japan)- "I'm Not Afraid To Die"

== Videography ==
- "Who I Am" (Music Video, 2011)
- "The Difference Between Us" (Music Video, 2012)
- "The Escape" (Music Video, 2013)
- "Into the Rest" ft. Kellin Quinn from Sleeping With Sirens (Music Video, 2015)
- "Carving Flowers" (Lyric Video, 2016)
- "Sing Me To Sleep" (Music Video, 2016)

== Band members ==
Past members

- Evan Couture - Vocals (2011–2019)
- Jordan Modro - Guitar (2011–2019)
- Josh Cutlip - Drums (2011–2018)
- Sean Humphrey - Bass (2011–2018)
