= Daniel Spriggs =

- Genres: CCM, pop rock, punk rock
- Years active: 2024–present
- Label: Independent / Modern Revivalists (Distributer)
- Website: danielspriggs.com

Daniel Spriggs is an American contemporary Christian singer-songwriter known for his blend of pop punk sound and vulnerable lyrics.

== Career ==
Spriggs’ first major public role in Christian music came when he joined The Joneses, a Southern gospel family group based in Wheelersburg, Ohio. The group consisted of Joy Jonas, her son Ryan Jonas, and Daniel Spriggs, who met Ryan at the Ohio Christian University.

After his time with The Joneses, Spriggs shifted toward a more rock sound as a solo artist, releasing "Love Lifted Me" in 2020 as one of his first major singles. His later singles, including “WASHED IN THE WATER” and “HEART2HEART”, introduced his stylistic blend of Christian pop and pop‑punk. These tracks helped establish his presence in the Chrisian music industry. He is also known for writing and producing tracks for the band TAKEHEART.

In 2025, Spriggs released several additional singles, most notably “SHOW ME HOW TO LIVE” and “My Favorite Part”, the latter a collaboration with Christian punk artist Grace Graber. The song was promoted as a message of hope and suicide‑prevention, reflecting Spriggs’ interest in addressing mental health concerns through spiritually grounded music.

He later released his debut studio album on February 17, 2026, called 21st Century Syndrome.

== Discography ==
Studio Albums

- 21st Century Syndrome (2026)

Singles

Year	Song	Album
2024	"WASHED IN THE WATER"	Single
2025	"HEART2HEART"	21st Century Syndrome
2025	"My Favorite Part" (Grace Graber feat. Daniel Spriggs)	Single
2025	"SHOW ME HOW TO LIVE"	21st Century Syndrome
2026	"clarity" (feat. Kellin Quinn)	Single

== See also ==
- Christian punk
- Pop-punk
- Contemporary Christian music
