= Let's Cheers to This =

Let's Cheers To This

Studio album by Sleeping with Sirens
- Released: May 10, 2011
- Studios: Interlace Audio, Portland, Oregon
- Genres: Post-hardcore; pop-punk; metalcore; emo pop
- Length: 40:40
- Label: Rise
- Producers: Kris Crummett, Sleeping with Sirens

Sleeping with Sirens chronology
With Ears to See and Eyes to Hear (2010)	Let's Cheers To This (2011)	If You Were a Movie, This Would Be Your Soundtrack (2012)

Singles from Let's Cheers to This
- 1. "Do It Now Remember It Later" Released: April 8, 2011; 2. "Fire" Released: April 28, 2011; 3. "If You Can't Hang" Released: September 14, 2011; 4. "A Trophy Father's Trophy Son" Released: October 15, 2011

Professional ratings
Review scores
Source	Rating
AbsolutePunk	77%
AllMusic	3.5/5 stars
Dead Press!	8/10 stars
Review Rinse Repeat	3/5 stars
Rockfreaks.net	8/10 stars
Sound Scene	4/5 stars

Let's Cheers to This is the second album by the American rock band Sleeping with Sirens. It was produced by Kris Crummett and released on May 10, 2011, via Rise Records. The album is the first to feature guitarists Jesse Lawson and Jack Fowler.

== Background ==
On December 7, 2010, the musicians announced they were producing a new album which was to be released in mid-2011. The band secured Kris Crummett, who had previously worked with Dance Gavin Dance, as producer. The group entered the studio in February 2011.

The album's working title was originally Who Are You Now? However, it was later released as Let's Cheers to This. The original title had a religious connotation, but the concept of the songs did not, so the name was changed. Furthermore, the band This Providence had already released an album of the same name, so the musicians wanted to avoid confusion.

== Production ==
Recording took place at Interlace Audio in Portland, Oregon. Sessions were co-produced by Kris Crummett, who also served as the engineer. Crummett added percussion, electronics, piano and strings, before mixing and mastering the recordings.

== Composition ==
"Do It Now Remember It Later" is about people who stand in the way of others' dreams. For the band, this refers to critics and people they work with. "If You Can't Hang" is about three different relationships and the lessons learned from them. Quinn came up with the pre-chorus while waiting before a show in San Francisco, with the rest of the song following shortly after. "Who Are You Now" talks about hope and self-reflection. "Four Corners and Two Sides" discuss faith and where a person stands with it. Quinn came up with "A Trophy Father's Trophy Son" while thinking about divorce and how it affects the parent's children. It is written from the perspective of a son to a father.

Guitarist Jack Fowler showed the rest of the band a riff, which later became "Fire". It talks about a drive people have inside themselves, and the knowledge that what we do could consumes us. "Tally It Up: Settle the Score" was the first song written for the album. The band were apprehensive about including "Your Nickel Ain't Like My Dime", but, according to Quinn, "it has a vibe that not many bands can pull off in our scene." Quinn and guitarist Jesse Lawson wrote "All My Heart" acoustically, and decided to include it as-is on the album. Quinn titled the last track "Let's Cheers to This" after his stepson's enthusiasm for New Years Day. He added that it, along with the album, is a "cheers to triumph, hard times, success, and to life itself."

== Release ==
On March 30, 2011, Let's Cheers to This was announced for release in May. The album's artwork and track listing was revealed. In March and April, the group supported Of Mice & Men on the Artery Foundation Across The Nation Tour in the US. On April 7, "Do It Now Remember It Later" was made available for streaming, before being released as a single the following day. Let's Cheers to This was released on May 10 through Rise Records. The album's working title was "Who Are You Now?", being named after a Christian moral, but it was renamed due to the album not having any religious attributes. Later that month, the band made an appearance at Bled Fest. On July 10, the group filmed a music video for "If You Can't Hang" in Ohio. In July and August, the group participated in the All Stars Tour in the US. The "If You Can't Hang" music video was released on September 22. In September and October, the group supported A Skylit Drive on their headlining European tour.

In October and November, the group supported Alesana on the Rock Yourself to Sleep tour in the US. On November 15, the group posted that they were filming a music video for "Do It Now Remember It Later". In November and December, the group supported We Came as Romans on the Take a Picture, It Will Last Longer tour in the US. In January and February 2012, the group supported Attack Attack! on their US tour. On February 28, the music video for "Do It Now Remember It Later" was premiered via Alternative Press. In March and April, the group went on a headlining US tour with main support from Abandon All Ships and Secrets. They were also supported on the first half of the tour by Lions Lions, with Conditions supporting the second half. Between June and August, the group performed on the Warped Tour. In October and November, the band supported Pierce the Veil on their Collide with the Sky Tour in the US.

== Track listing ==
Track listing per booklet.

No.	Title	Length
1.	"Do It Now Remember It Later"	3:26
2.	"If You Can't Hang"	4:10
3.	"Who Are You Now"	4:17
4.	"Four Corners and Two Sides"	3:18
5.	"A Trophy Father's Trophy Son"	3:43
6.	"Fire"	3:50
7.	"Tally It Up: Settle the Score"	3:35
8.	"Your Nickel Ain't Worth My Dime"	2:48
9.	"Postcards and Polaroids"	3:14
10.	"All My Heart"	4:39
11.	"Let's Cheers to This"	3:40
Total length:		40:40

== Personnel ==
Personnel per booklet.

Sleeping with Sirens

- Kellin Quinn – vocals
- Jesse Lawson – guitar, vocals
- Justin Hills – bass guitar, vocals
- Gabe Barham – drums, percussion
- Jack Fowler – guitar

Additional musicians

- Kris Crummett – percussion, electronics, piano, strings

Production

- Kris Crummett – producer, engineer, mixing, mastering
- Sleeping with Sirens – producer
- Invisible Creature, Inc. – art direction
- Ryan Clark – design

== Charts ==
Chart performance for Let's Cheers to This
Chart (2011–2013)	Peak position
UK Independent Album Breakers (OCC)	13
US Billboard 200	78
US Independent Albums (Billboard)	13
US Top Rock Albums (Billboard)	21
US Top Hard Rock Albums (Billboard)	5

== Certifications ==
Certifications and sales for Let's Cheers to This
Region	Certification	Certified units/sales
United States (RIAA)	Gold	500,000^{‡}
^{‡} Sales+streaming figures based on certification alone.
