= If You Were a Movie, This Would Be Your Soundtrack =

2012 EP by Sleeping with Sirens

EP by Sleeping with Sirens
- Released: June 26, 2012
- Recorded: January–February 2012
- Length: 18:13
- Label: Rise
- Producers: Mark Trombino; Kellin Quinn; Jesse Lawson

Sleeping with Sirens chronology
Let's Cheers to This (2011)	If You Were a Movie, This Would Be Your Soundtrack (2012)	Feel (2013)

Singles from If You Were a Movie, This Would Be Your Soundtrack.
- 1. "Scene Three – Stomach Tied in Knots" Released: June 6, 2012; 2. "Scene Four – Don't You Ever Forget About Me" Released: June 26, 2012; 3. "Scene Two – Roger Rabbit" Released: October 10, 2012

Professional ratings
Review scores
Source	Rating
AbsolutePunk	(75%)
Rockfreaks.net	7.5/10 stars

If You Were a Movie, This Would Be Your Soundtrack is the debut EP and first acoustic release by American rock band Sleeping with Sirens. It was produced by Mark Trombino, Kellin Quinn, and Jesse Lawson. The EP was released on June 26, 2012, through Rise Records and debuted at No. 17 on the Billboard 200 charts, selling 17,486 in the first week.

The EP features acoustic versions of "If I'm James Dean, You're Audrey Hepburn" and "With Ears to See, and Eyes to Hear", both from the band's debut album With Ears to See and Eyes to Hear (2010), alongside three new songs. A music video for "Scene Two – Roger Rabbit" was released on October 10, 2012, via mtvU.

== Track listing ==
No.	Title	Length
1.	"Scene One – James Dean and Audrey Hepburn"	4:16
2.	"Scene Two – Roger Rabbit"	3:17
3.	"Scene Three – Stomach Tied in Knots"	3:29
4.	"Scene Four – Don't You Ever Forget About Me"	3:24
5.	"Scene Five – With Ears to See and Eyes to Hear"	3:47
6.	"Iris" (Goo Goo Dolls cover, written by Johnny Rzeznik. Only on some versions.)
Total length:		18:13

== Personnel ==
Personnel adapted from the EP's liner notes.

Sleeping with Sirens

- Kellin Quinn – lead vocals
- Jesse Lawson – rhythm guitar, backing vocals
- Jack Fowler – lead guitar on "Scene Three – Stomach Tied in Knots"

Additional personnel

- Jessica Ess – additional vocals on "Scene Four – Don't You Ever Forget About Me"

Production

- Mark Trombino – producer, engineer, mixer
- Kellin Quinn – producer
- Jesse Lawson – producer

== Charts ==
Chart (2012)	Peak position
Australian Hitseekers Albums (ARIA)	11
Canadian Alternative Albums (Nielsen SoundScan)	42
US Billboard 200	17
US Independent Albums (Billboard)	4
US Top Rock Albums (Billboard)	6
