= Feel (Sleeping with Sirens album) =

Studio album by Sleeping with Sirens
- Released: June 4, 2013
- Recorded: 2012–2013
- Studio: Chango
- Genres: Post-hardcore; pop rock; alternative rock; emo pop
- Length: 44:50
- Label: Rise
- Producer: Cameron Mizell

Sleeping with Sirens chronology
If You Were a Movie, This Would Be Your Soundtrack (2012)	Feel (2013)	Madness (2015)

Singles from Feel
- 1. "Low" Released: April 23, 2013; 2. "Alone" Released: May 21, 2013; 3. "Congratulations" Released: October 29, 2013

Feel is the third album by the American rock band Sleeping with Sirens. The album was released on June 4, 2013, through Rise Records. It was produced by Cameron Mizell who had produced their debut album. The album features guest appearances by Machine Gun Kelly, Fronz (Attila), Matty Mullins (Memphis May Fire) and Shayley Bourget (Dayshell, ex–Of Mice & Men).

It is the final album to feature rhythm guitarist Jesse Lawson who left the band later in 2013.

== Background ==
In December 2012, vocalist Kellin Quinn teased about a new album, stating "If the world doesn't end before #2013, [we'll] deliver an amazing album to you!" On February 6, 2013, Quinn posted that he had finished tracking vocals for the album. Recording was done at Chango Studios with producer Cameron Mizell, who also acted as the engineer, and was assisted by Alex Prieto. Shawn Christmas and Earl Halasan contributed additional programming. Dan Korneff mixed the album at Sonic Debris Recording Studio in New York, while Ted Jensen mastered it.

The majority of the songs on the album were written by the band, except for a few: "Alone" by the band and Kelly; "Congratulations" by the band and Mullins; "These Things I've Done", "Satellites", and "Sorry" by the band and Mizell.

== Release ==
In March and April 2013, the group went on a headlining US tour, dubbed the Take It or Leave It Tour, with support from Conditions, Dangerkids and Lions Lions. On April 22, Feel was announced for release in June. In addition, a lyric video was released for "Low". On May 20, "Alone" was made available for streaming. The following day, it was released as a single. On May 24, "The Best There Ever Was" was made available for streaming. A day later, "Free Now" was made available for streaming. On May 26, "Congratulations" was made available for streaming. Later that day, the rest of the album was made available for streaming. In May and June, the band went on a headlining tour of the UK and Europe.

Feel was released on June 4 through Rise Records. Two days later, a music video was released for "Alone". In the summer, the group embarked on the Warped Tour. In September and October, the group went on a tour of Europe and the UK. On October 16, it was announced that guitarist Jesse Lawson had left the group, choosing to focus on his family. On October 29, a music video was released for "Congratulations". In October and November, the group embarked on The Feel This Tour in the US with support from Memphis May Fire, Breathe Carolina, Issues and Our Last Night.

== Reception ==
=== Critical response ===
Professional ratings
Review scores
Source	Rating
AllMusic	3.5/5 stars
Alternative Press	3.5/5 stars
FasterLouder	7/10
idobi	3.75/5
Ultimate Guitar	8.3/10

Feel received generally positive reviews from music critics. Gregory Heaney of AllMusic commented that "the talented vocal of Kellin Quinn making an album like Feel a shining light in an increasingly homogenized post-hardcore landscape." Scott Heisel of Alternative Press stated "while the collaboration with MGK gels perfectly and could totally be a crossover smash, the collaboration with Memphis May Fire’s Matty Mullins is misguided" and continued "still, the good more than outweighs the bad, and as a whole, Feel is a big step up."

=== Commercial performance ===
The album debuted at number 3 on the US Billboard 200 chart, selling around 60,000 copies in its first week, making the album one of the highest charting post-hardcore albums of all time. It has sold 180,000 copies in the US as of March 2015. The album also debuted at number 36 on UK Albums Chart and number 14 on Australian Albums Chart.

== Track listing ==
All songs written by Sleeping with Sirens, except where noted.

No.	Title	Writer(s)	Length
1.	"Feel"		4:41
2.	"Here We Go"		3:19
3.	"Free Now"		3:53
4.	"Alone" (featuring Machine Gun Kelly)	Sleeping with Sirens; Machine Gun Kelly	3:47
5.	"I'll Take You There" (featuring Shayley Bourget of Dayshell)		4:03
6.	"The Best There Ever Was" (featuring Fronz of Attila)		3:20
7.	"Low"		3:42
8.	"Congratulations" (featuring Matty Mullins of Memphis May Fire)	Sleeping with Sirens; Matty Mullins	4:42
9.	"Déjà Vu"		3:17
10.	"These Things I've Done"	Sleeping with Sirens; Cameron Mizell	3:25
11.	"Sorry"	Sleeping with Sirens; Mizell	3:02
12.	"Satellites"	Sleeping with Sirens; Mizell	3:39
Total length:			44:50

== Personnel ==
Personnel per booklet.

Sleeping with Sirens

- Kellin Quinn – lead vocals
- Jesse Lawson – rhythm guitar
- Jack Fowler – lead guitar
- Gabe Barham – drums, percussion
- Justin Hills – bass

Additional musicians

- Shawn Christmas – additional programming
- Earl Halasan – additional programming
- Machine Gun Kelly – additional vocals (track 4)
- Matty Mullins – additional vocals (track 8)
- Shayley Bourget – additional vocals (track 5)
- Chris Fronzak – additional vocals on "The Best There Ever Was"

Production and design

- Cameron Mizell – producer, engineer
- Alex Prieto – assistant engineer
- Dan Korneff – mixing
- Ted Jensen – mastering
- Ryan Clark – art direction, design

== Charts ==
=== Weekly charts ===
Chart (2013)	Peak position
Australian Albums (ARIA)	14
Scottish Albums (Official Charts)	38
UK Albums (Official Charts)	36
US Billboard 200	3
US Independent Albums (Billboard)	2
US Top Rock Albums (Billboard)	2

=== Year-end charts ===
Chart (2013)	Position
US Top Rock Albums (Billboard)	58
