= Jack Fowler (musician) =

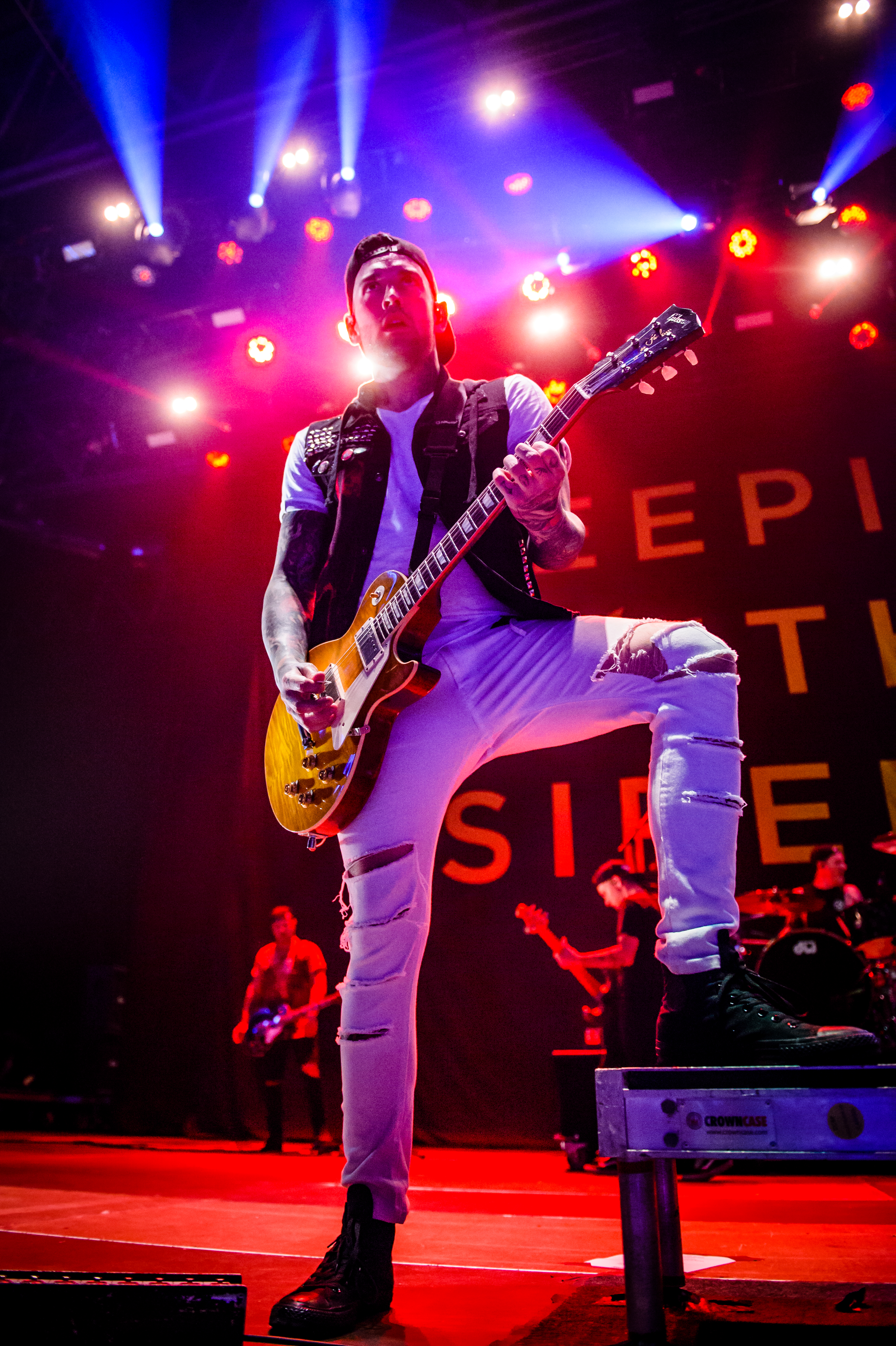
- Jack Fowler with Sleeping with Sirens at Rock im Park, 2017.

Background information
- Born: Jack Fowler; January 25, 1991 (age 35); Florida
- Genres: Post-hardcore; pop-punk; alternative rock; emo; metalcore; hard rock
- Occupations: Singer; musician; songwriter
- Instruments: Vocals; guitar
- Years active: 2007–present
- Formerly of: Broadway; Sleeping with Sirens

Jack Fowler (born January 25, 1991) is an American rock musician. He is a former lead guitarist for Sleeping with Sirens and was previously active in the band Broadway, where he also played guitar.

== Career ==
=== With Broadway ===
Before joining Sleeping with Sirens, Fowler was active as a guitarist in the band Broadway. With the group, he released the album Kingdoms, on which he appeared as a guitarist. On May 19, 2011, it was announced that he had left Broadway to join Sleeping with Sirens.

=== With Sleeping with Sirens ===
Jack Fowler has been a guitarist for Sleeping with Sirens since May 2011. He had previously worked with both Sleeping with Sirens and Broadway before deciding in May 2011 to play exclusively for one band. With Sleeping with Sirens, he released the albums Let's Cheers to This, Feel, Madness, Gossip, How It Feels To Be Lost, and Complete Collapse.

On July 14, 2022, guitarist Jack Fowler announced he had departed the band, having contributed to the album before the announcement. He is currently a touring guitarist for country artist/rapper Jelly Roll.

== Discography ==
=== With Broadway ===
- 2009: Kingdoms (Uprising Records)

=== With Sleeping with Sirens ===
- 2011: Let's Cheers to This (Album, Rise Records)
- 2012: If You Were a Movie, This Would Be Your Soundtrack (EP, Rise Records)
- 2013: Feel (Album, Rise Records)
- 2015: Madness (Album, Epitaph Records)
- 2017: Gossip (Album, Warner Records)
- 2019: How It Feels to Be Lost (Album, Sumerian Records)
- 2022: Complete Collapse (Album, Sumerian Records)

== Awards and nominations ==
- Alternative Press Music Awards
  - 2016: Best Guitarist (nominated)
