= If You Can't Hang =

Single by Sleeping with Sirens

from the album Let's Cheers to This
- Released: September 14, 2011
- Studio: Interlace Audio, Portland, Oregon
- Genre: Post-hardcore; emo; pop-punk
- Length: 4:11
- Label: Rise
- Songwriters: Kellin Quinn; Jesse Lawson; Justin Hills; Gabe Barham; Jack Fowler
- Producers: Kris Crummett; Sleeping with Sirens

Sleeping with Sirens singles chronology
"Fire" (2011)	"If You Can't Hang" (2011)	"A Trophy Father's Trophy Son" (2011)

"If You Can’t Hang" is a song by American rock band Sleeping with Sirens. The song is from the band's second studio album, Let's Cheers to This. It was released as the album's third single on September 14, 2011. One of the band's most successful songs, the single was certified 2× platinum by the RIAA in April 2026.

== Composition ==
"If You Can't Hang" is about three different relationships and the lessons learned from them. Quinn came up with the pre-chorus while waiting before a show in San Francisco, with the rest of the song following shortly after. The track runs at 192 BPM and is in the key of D minor. The band performed the song live at the 2014 Alternative Press Music Awards.

== Reception ==
"If You Can't Hang" has been seen as a highlight track from Let's Cheers to This. Oliver Thompson of "Dead Press!" said "This continues into the incredibly catchy 'If You Can't Hang…', whose chorus is catchier than the common cold."

== Music video ==
The music video for "If You Can't Hang" was released on September 14, 2011. The video was directed by Thunder Down Country and showcases the band playing in a room.

== Personnel ==
Sleeping with Sirens

- Gabe Barham – drums, production
- Justin Hills – bass guitar, vocals, production
- Jack Fowler – guitar, production
- Jesse Lawson – guitar, vocals, production
- Kellin Quinn – vocals, production

Additional contributors

- Kris Crummett – production, mastering, mixing, engineering, percussion, electronics, piano, strings
- Invisible Creature – art direction
- Ryan Clark – design

== Charts ==
Chart performance for "If You Can't Hang"
Chart (2014)	Peak position
US Hard Rock Digital Song Sales (Billboard)	23

== Certification ==
Certifications for "If You Can't Hang"
Region	Certification	Certified units/sales
United Kingdom (BPI)	Silver	200,000^{‡}
United States (RIAA)	2× Platinum	2,000,000^{‡}
^{‡} Sales+streaming figures based on certification alone.
