= Complete Collapse =

Studio album by Sleeping with Sirens
- Released: October 14, 2022
- Recorded: 2020–21
- Studios: Wardog (Nashville, Tennessee); MDDN (Los Angeles, California)
- Genres: Post-hardcore; metalcore; pop metal
- Length: 41:13
- Label: Sumerian
- Producers: Andrew Marcus Baylis; Zakk Cervini

Sleeping with Sirens chronology
How It Feels to Be Lost (2019)	Complete Collapse (2022)	An Ending in Itself (2026)

Singles from Complete Collapse
- 1. "Bloody Knuckles" Released: June 2, 2021; 2. "Crosses" Released: June 22, 2022; 3. "Let You Down" Released: August 11, 2022; 4. "Ctrl + Alt + Del" Released: August 11, 2022; 5. "Complete Collapse" Released: September 14, 2022; 6. "Be Happy" Released: October 14, 2022; 7. "Don't Let the Party Die" Released: September 29, 2023

Complete Collapse is the seventh studio album by American rock band Sleeping with Sirens. It was released on October 14, 2022, by Sumerian Records. It serves as a follow-up to their sixth studio album, How It Feels to Be Lost (2019). It is their first album to feature drummer Matty Best of Tonight Alive who replaced longtime drummer Gabe Barham. It is also their final album to feature longtime guitarist Jack Fowler, who departed the band early before the album's release. The album also features guest appearances from Spencer Chamberlain of Underoath, Charlotte Sands, Royal & the Serpent, and Dorothy.

== Promotion ==
On June 2, 2021, Sleeping with Sirens released the song "Bloody Knuckles" as the lead single of the then-untitled album. A second single, "Crosses", which features Spencer Chamberlain of Underoath, was released on June 22, 2022, simultaneously with the album's announcement, followed by the releases of two promotional singles "Let You Down" featuring Charlotte Sands, and "Ctrl + Alt + Del" on August 11, 2022. The single "Complete Collapse" was released on September 14, 2022, alongside an accompanying music video. On September 29, 2023, the band released the deluxe version of the album, which featured four acoustic tracks and a bonus song, "Don't Let The Party Die".

== Track listing ==
All tracks are written by Kellin Quinn and Jack Fowler (except for track 17), with additional writers noted.

Complete Collapse track listing
No.	Title	Writer(s)	Length
1.	"Tyrants"	Nick Martin; Andrew Marcus Baylis	3:25
2.	"Complete Collapse"	Baylis; Michael Whitworth	3:12
3.	"Crosses" (featuring Spencer Chamberlain of Underoath)	Martin; Baylis; Andrew Fulk; Spencer Chamberlain; Zakk Cervini	3:29
4.	"Family Tree"	Martin; Baylis; Julian Comeau	4:13
5.	"Let You Down" (featuring Charlotte Sands)	Martin; Baylis; Comeau	3:25
6.	"Be Happy" (featuring Royal & the Serpent)	Baylis; Cody Quistad	3:18
7.	"Us" (featuring Dorothy)	Martin; Cervini	3:44
8.	"Ctrl + Alt + Del"	Cervini	3:05
9.	"Bloody Knuckles"	Baylis; Jayden Panesso	3:27
10.	"Mr. Nice Guy"	Baylis	2:59
11.	"Apathetic"	Baylis	3:27
12.	"Grave"	Baylis; Cervini; Nick Furlong	3:23
Total length:			41:13

Deluxe edition bonus tracks
No.	Title	Writer(s)	Length
13.	"Complete Collapse" (Acoustic)	Baylis; Whitworth	3:04
14.	"Let You Down" (Acoustic)	Martin; Baylis; Comeau	3:03
15.	"Us" (Acoustic)	Martin; Cervini	4:25
16.	"Be Happy" (Acoustic)	Baylis; Cody Quistad	2:42
17.	"Don't Let the Party Die"	Quinn; Jonathan Eberhard; Tyler Smyth	2:46
Total length:			57:15

== Personnel ==
Personnel adapted from the booklet.

Sleeping with Sirens

- Kellin Quinn – lead vocals
- Justin Hills – bass guitar
- Jack Fowler – lead guitar
- Nick Martin – rhythm guitar, backing vocals
- Matty Best – drums, percussion

Additional personnel

- Spencer Chamberlain – vocals on "Crosses"
- Charlotte Sands – vocals on "Let You Down"
- Royal & the Serpent – vocals on "Be Happy"
- Dorothy – vocals on "Us"

Production

- Andrew Marcus Baylis – producer (track 1, 2, 4–6, 9, 11), engineer
- Zakk Cervini – producer (track 3, 7, 8, 12), mixing
- Nik Trekov – additional production on "Us", engineer, mix assistant
- Jayden Panesso – programming on "Bloody Knuckles"
- Michael Bono – additional editing on "Crosses"
- Randy Slaugh – additional programming
- Dylan Forrester – additional editing
- Jaime Collazo – additional editing
- Ted Jensen – mastering
- Joby J Ford – album artwork
- Josh Adams – photography

== Charts ==
Complete Collapse ratings
Review scores
Source	Rating
Square One Magazine	3/5 stars

Chart performance for Complete Collapse
Chart (2022)	Peak position
UK Rock & Metal Albums (Official Charts)	25
US Top Current Album Sales (Billboard)	53
