= How It Feels to Be Lost =

Studio album by Sleeping with Sirens
- Released: September 6, 2019
- Recorded: 2018–19
- Studios: MDDN Studios, Los Angeles, California
- Genres: Post-hardcore; metalcore; pop metal
- Length: 38:24
- Label: Sumerian
- Producers: Matt Good; Zakk Cervini

Sleeping with Sirens chronology
Gossip (2017)	How It Feels to Be Lost (2019)	Complete Collapse (2022)

Singles from How It Feels to Be Lost
- 1. "Leave It All Behind" Released: June 19, 2019; 2. "Break Me Down" Released: July 19, 2019; 3. "Agree to Disagree" Released: August 9, 2019; 4. "How It Feels to Be Lost" Released: September 6, 2019; 5. "Talking to Myself" Released: July 24, 2020

How It Feels to Be Lost is the sixth studio album by American rock band Sleeping with Sirens, released through Sumerian Records on September 6, 2019. It serves as a follow-up to the group's 2017 album Gossip, and is their first release on Sumerian since departing with Warner Bros. Records and marks a return to the band's post-hardcore roots. It is also their final album to feature longtime drummer Gabe Barham, who departed from the band a week before the album's release.

The album was supported by three singles; "Leave It All Behind", "Break Me Down" and "Agree to Disagree". To promote the album, the band toured on the entirety of the inaugural Rockstar Energy Disrupt Festival from June to July 2019 and embarked on a co-headlining 2019 North American tour with British rock band Bring Me the Horizon.

A deluxe edition of the album was released on August 21, 2020, featuring the single "Talking to Myself", which was released on July 24, 2020.

Loudwire named it one of the 50 best rock albums of 2019.

== Background ==
Kellin Quinn expressed his feelings on touring and performing the tracks from Gossip in a 2019 interview with Loudwire. "The year or two after touring that record, I had a really hard time going onstage and believing in the things I was saying. I didn't feel like a legend. I didn't feel like all those positive things that I was trying to push across to people. After Gossip, we weren't sure what we were going to do. We were talking about maybe doing a hiatus." Quinn explained that his biggest regret was not taking a break from the band and touring. "I should've said something, but I just kind of rolled with it. I think that's my biggest regret."

For unknown reasons, Matt Good is credited to produce an unknown twelfth track (on standard edition), which is non-existent on the album.

== Release and promotion ==
On April 29, 2019, vocalist Kellin Quinn revealed that the album was completed. On May 31, the group performed a new track, titled "Leave It All Behind", live for the first time at All Points East Music Festival. On June 16, the band cleared their Instagram account, which was followed by video teasers for two consecutive days. On June 19, the band released "Leave It All Behind" digitally, accompanied with its music video, which was directed by Ben Thornley. Alongside this, How It Feels to Be Lost was announced for release, with its artwork and track listing being revealed. Following this, the group appeared on the 2019 Warped Tour. While on the Rockstar Disrupt touring festival in mid-July, the band performed "Break Me Down"; it was made available for streaming four days later.

A behind-the-scenes making-of video for "Leave It All Behind" was posted online on August 1. "Agree to Disagree" premiered on the SXM Octane radio station on August 9, prior to the release of the track's music video. On August 30, it was announced that drummer Gabe Barham had left the group. How It Feels to Be Lost was released on September 6 through Sumerian Records; alongside this, a music video was released for the title-track, directed by Frankie Nasso. In October, the group supported Bring Me the Horizon on their headlining US tour. Following this, they embarked on a headlining European and UK tour, with support from Palisades, SHVPES and Holding Absence. In January and February 2020, they went on a headlining US tour, dubbed The Medicine Tour, with support from Set It Off, Belmont and Point North.

== Track listing ==
How It Feels to Be Lost track listing
No.	Title	Length
1.	"Leave It All Behind"	3:18
2.	"Never Enough" (featuring Benji Madden of Good Charlotte)	3:42
3.	"How It Feels to Be Lost"	3:38
4.	"Agree to Disagree"	3:03
5.	"Ghost"	3:26
6.	"Blood Lines"	3:28
7.	"Break Me Down"	3:11
8.	"Another Nightmare"	3:33
9.	"P.S. Missing You"	4:15
10.	"Medicine (Devil in My Head)"	3:14
11.	"Dying to Believe"	3:37
Total length:		38:24

Deluxe edition bonus tracks
No.	Title	Length
12.	"Talking to Myself"	3:10
13.	"Leave It All Behind" (Acoustic)	2:59
14.	"Agree to Disagree" (Acoustic)	3:10
15.	"Ghost" (Acoustic)	3:29
Total length:		51:12

== Personnel ==
Credits are adapted from the album's liner notes and Tidal.

=== Sleeping with Sirens ===
- Kellin Quinn – vocals
- Jack Fowler – guitar
- Nick Martin – guitar
- Justin Hills – bass
- Gabe Barham – drums

=== Additional personnel ===
- Zakk Cervini – production, engineering, mixing (tracks 1, 2, 4, 5, 7, 9)
- Matt Good – production, mixing (3, 6, 8, 10, 12)
- Zach Jones – production (12)
- Jon Lundin – additional engineering
- Nik Tretiakov – editing
- Doug Dean – album artwork
- Daniel McBride – layout
- Ryan Watanabe – band photo
- Benji Madden – vocals on "Never Enough"

== Charts ==
Chart (2019)	Peak position
Australian Digital Albums (ARIA)	16
Scottish Albums (Official Charts)	84
UK Album Downloads (Official Charts)	36
US Billboard 200	92
