= Kick Me (song) =

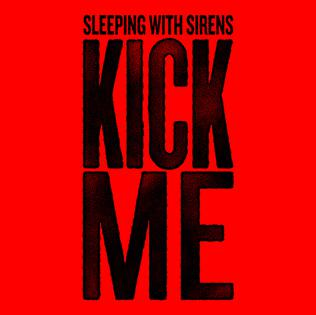

Single by Sleeping with Sirens

from the album Madness
- B-side: "We Like It Loud"
- Released: November 10, 2014
- Recorded: 2014
- Genre: Post-hardcore
- Length: 2:31
- Label: Epitaph
- Songwriters: Kellin Quinn; John Feldmann; Nick Furlong
- Producer: John Feldmann

Sleeping with Sirens singles chronology
"Alone" (2013)	"Kick Me" (2014)	"Go Go Go" (2015)

"Kick Me" is a song performed by American rock band Sleeping with Sirens released on November 10, 2014 on Epitaph Records. The song was produced by John Feldmann and is the lead single off of the band's fourth studio album Madness, released on March 17, 2015. The song marks the band's first release on Epitaph Records following their departure from their former label Rise Records. "Kick Me" won Song of the Year award by Alternative Press.

== Background ==
The band debuted "Kick Me" live at Camden Underworld on August 21, 2014 in London. It was also part of the band's set list on their five month long tour with Pierce the Veil in November 2014, dubbed the World Tour. Speaking about the meaning behind the song, singer Kellin Quinn stated, "It doesn't matter what anyone thinks about you, as long as you know who you are inside."

== Music video ==
The music video for the song was shot on location at Camden Underworld live during the band's set in London. It premiered on the official Epitaph Records YouTube channel on Monday, November 10, 2014. It was directed by the Sitcom Soldiers.

== Track listing ==
No.	Title	Length
1.	"Kick Me"	2:31
Total length:		2:31

== Charts ==
Chart performance for "Kick Me"
Chart (2014)	Peak position
UK Rock & Metal (Official Charts)	10
US Hot Rock & Alternative Songs (Billboard)	23

== Release history ==
Country	Date	Format
United States	November 10, 2014	Digital download
