= Madness (Sleeping with Sirens album) =

Studio album by Sleeping with Sirens
- Released: March 17, 2015
- Recorded: June–September 2014
- Studios: Foxy, Los Angeles, CA; Rock Falcon, Franklin, TN (Track 14–15)
- Genres: Post-hardcore; pop-punk; pop metal; emo
- Length: 40:49
- Label: Epitaph
- Producer: John Feldmann

Sleeping with Sirens chronology
| Feel (2013) | Madness (2015) | Live and Unplugged (2016) |

Singles from Madness
- 1. "Kick Me" Released: November 10, 2014; 2. "We Like It Loud" Released: January 1, 2015; 3. "Go Go Go" Released: January 22, 2015; 4. "Better Off Dead" Released: March 12, 2015

Madness is the fourth studio album by American rock band Sleeping with Sirens. The album was released on March 17, 2015, through Epitaph Records. The album was self-produced by the band and John Feldmann. The album is the band's first release following their departure from Rise Records in 2014. It is their first album record to feature guitarist Nick Martin of D.R.U.G.S. and Underminded who replaced former guitarist Jesse Lawson. Madness was preceded by lead single "Kick Me" as well as a string of digital singles. The album continues the band's progression to a more pop rock–style sound, but retains some post-hardcore influences on tracks.

== Background and recording ==
Following the release of the band's third studio album, Feel (2013), they toured extensively worldwide in support of the album. In May 2014, the band posted that they were in the studio in Nashville, Tennessee and recorded 13 tracks with Nick Raskulinecz, however later scrapped them and recorded new material for a fourth album in Los Angeles, California. In June, Quinn posted a clip of a new song online. The band recorded a total of 15 new tracks with producer John Feldmann. Quinn explains, "We just planned on going to Feldmann to do 2 or 3 songs and after we got in there, I'm like, 'we're gonna re-do this whole thing." The two bonus tracks, "Parasites" and "2 Chord" were produced by Raskulinecz.

== Sound and influence ==
Madness is a pop rock album with punk and hardcore influences. According to a review by Radio.com, the album has "empowering lyrics and anthem-like sing-along choruses" and is "massive, emotional, and speaks directly to disaffected youth and others who’ve been told they’ll never amount to anything." Due to the fact that the album's recording sessions took place throughout a time when Sleeping with Sirens were not signed to a record label and had little money, frontman Kellin Quinn said "it's always chaotic and madness and just being caught in the middle of it and figuring out who you are in the midst of all the craziness."

== Release ==
In late August, the group performed a new track, entitled "Kick Me", live at the Reading and Leeds Festivals. In addition, it was announced that the group had recently shot a music video for the track. The music video for the song was released on November 10. In November and December, the group went on a co-headlining US with Pierce the Veil with support from Beartooth and This Wild Life. On January 1, 2015, "We Like It Loud" was made available for streaming and as a free download. On January 22, Madness was announced for release in March. In addition, a music video was also released for "Go Go Go". Between January and March, the group embarked on a second leg of their co-headlining US tour with Pierce the Veil. They were supported by PVRIS and Mallory Knox. "Better Off Dead" was released on March 12, 2015.

"Fly" was made available for streaming on March 10, followed by "Gold" on March 12, and "Save Me a Spark" on March 13. Madness was released on March 17 through Epitaph Records. On May 5, a music video was released for "The Strays". In June, the group went on an acoustic tour, dubbed the We Like It Quiet Tour, with support from The Summer Set and Nick Santino. On September 9, a music video was released for "Better Off Dead". In October and November, the group supported All Time Low on their Back to the Future Hearts tour in the US. In November and December 2016, the group went on headlining US tour with support from State Champs, Tonight Alive and Waterparks.

== Reception ==
=== Commercial reception ===
Madness debuted at No. 13 on the Billboard 200 selling 34,941 copies in its first week. As of August 2015, the album sold 79,200 copies.

=== Critical reception ===
Professional ratings
Aggregate scores
| Source | Rating |
|---|---|
| Metacritic | 74/100 |
Review scores
| Source | Rating |
| AllMusic | 3.5/5 stars |
| Alternative Press | 4/5 stars |
| Exclaim! | 4/10 |
| Kerrang! | 4/5 stars |
| The New York Times | 3/5 stars |
| Ultimate Guitar | 5.3/10 |

The album received generally positive reviews from professional music critics. According to review aggregate Metacritic, the album received a 74 out of 100 based on 6 reviews, citing "generally positive reviews".

Radio.com editor Jay Tilles talked about the album's third single, "The Strays" in his review stating: "Of the album’s 13 songs, sixth track “The Strays” stands out like a sore thumb. With its empowering lyrics and anthem-for-the-underdogs chorus, it's massive, emotional, and speaks directly to disaffected youth and others who've been told they'll never amount to anything. “Lost and thrown away/you know we’re better than that,” sings Kellin Quinn, the band's frontman, his voice a deceptively delicate tenor that has become one of the band's defining sounds."

Branan Ranjanathan for Exclaim! was more negative, feeling the album lacked cohesiveness, writing: "With their latest album, Sleeping With Sirens have tried to appeal to every group that has ever taken an interest in their particular sound, creating a disorienting, cluttered set of songs that lacks any definitive direction. Over the years the band's sound has shifted from straightforward post-hardcore to something more accessible to a pop audience, but Madness is a muddled attempt at fusing both sounds within a single album."

The album was included at number 25 on Rock Sound's top 50 releases of 2015 list. Madness was nominated for Album of the Year at the 2016 Alternative Press Music Awards.

== Track listing ==
All tracks are written by Kellin Quinn and John Feldmann (except for track 14 and 15), with additional writers noted.

Madness track listing
| No. | Title | Writer(s) | Length |
|---|---|---|---|
| 1. | "Kick Me" | Nick Furlong | 2:31 |
| 2. | "Go Go Go" | Simon Wilcox; Jack Fowler | 2:47 |
| 3. | "Gold" | Emily Warren | 3:32 |
| 4. | "Save Me a Spark" | Joel Madden; Wilcox | 3:39 |
| 5. | "Fly" | | 3:35 |
| 6. | "The Strays" | Wilcox | 2:58 |
| 7. | "Left Alone" | Jacob Kasher Hindlin | 3:20 |
| 8. | "Better Off Dead" | Furlong | 3:08 |
| 9. | "We Like It Loud" | | 2:17 |
| 10. | "Heroine" | Warren | 3:35 |
| 11. | "November" | Furlong | 3:29 |
| 12. | "Madness" | Wilcox | 2:42 |
| 13. | "Don't Say Anything" | Wilcox | 3:16 |
| Total length: | | | 40:49 |

Deluxe edition bonus tracks
| No. | Title | Writer(s) | Length |
|---|---|---|---|
| 14. | "Parasites" | Quinn; Fowler | 2:55 |
| 15. | "2 Chord" | Quinn; Fowler | 4:49 |
| Total length: | | | 48:33 |

== Personnel ==
Personnel per booklet.

Sleeping with Sirens

- Kellin Quinn – lead vocals, keyboards
- Jack Fowler – lead guitar, programming
- Nick Martin – rhythm guitar, backing vocals
- Justin Hills – bass guitar, backing vocals
- Gabe Barham – drums, percussion

Production

- John Feldmann – production (tracks 1–13)
- Zakk Cervini and John Feldmann – mixing (tracks 1, 3, 6, 8, 9, 10, 11 and 12)
- Tom Lord-Alge – mixing (tracks 2, 4, 5, 7 and 13)
- Nick Raskulinecz – production (tracks 14–15)
- Ted Jensen – mastering

== Chart performance ==
=== Peak positions ===
| Chart (2015) | Peak position |
|---|---|
| Australian Albums (ARIA) | 13 |
| Belgian Albums (Ultratop Flanders) | 122 |
| Canadian Albums (Billboard) | 23 |
| Dutch Albums (Album Top 100) | 83 |
| Japanese Albums (Oricon) | 159 |
| Scottish Albums (Official Charts) | 33 |
| UK Albums (Official Charts) | 26 |
| US Billboard 200 | 13 |

=== Year-end charts ===
| Chart (2015) | Position |
|---|---|
| U.S. Billboard Hard Rock Albums | 18 |
| U.S. Billboard Independent Albums | 26 |
| U.S. Billboard Top Rock Albums | 62 |
