= Broadway (band) =

American post-hardcore and screamo band

- Origin: Orlando, Florida, U.S.
- Genres: Post-hardcore; screamo; emo revival; alternative rock; pop punk
- Years active: 2007–2015; 2016
- Label: Uprising
- Past members: Misha Camacho; Sean Connors; Felipe Sanchez; Jack Fowler; Bryan Camara; Jake Garland; Gabriel Fernandez
- Website: Broadway on Facebook

Broadway was an American post-hardcore and screamo band from Orlando, Florida. Formed in 2007, the band "burst onto the music scene with their catchy hooks and sophisticated song structures."

The band joined Uprising Records to release their debut album Kingdoms in 2009 which features guest appearances by singers Jonny Craig and Craig Owens. The band is also known for their cover of The Lonely Island's single "I'm on a Boat", and have released three full-length albums entitled Kingdoms, Gentlemen's Brawl and Contexture: Gods, Men, & The Infinite Cosmos.

== History ==
=== Early years and Scratch and Sniff (2007–2009) ===
The band formed in Florida in 2007, with the drummer Jake Garland being the only founding member. The original line up had recently lost their singer and lead guitarist and Camacho had parted ways from a local band. In a March 2011 interview with Media Essentials, Camacho told them, "The current guitarist at the time found my stuff on MySpace and shot me an email asking if I was looking for a band. I came out to a practice and everything seemed to click." Camacho later asked his long-time friend Jack Fowler, with whom he had previously been in a couple of projects, to join the band. After that, members came and went, but eventually Fowler's friend Gabriel Fernandez from art school, joined as the bassist and Sean Connors joined as the guitarist from a band with whom the group was good friends.

In 2007, the band won the University of Central Florida's Battle of the Bands and also released their first EP titled Scratch and Sniff.

On January 1, 2009, the band released a cover of The Lonely Island's single "I'm On A Boat" on the band's MySpace band page. The song has also generated success on YouTube and has had over 1.59 million views.

=== Kingdoms (2009–2011) ===
Two years after the debut of their Scratch and Sniff EP, Broadway released their first full-length studio album. It was entitled Kingdoms and released on July 7, 2009, through Uprising Records. The album generated favorable reviews from fans and critics.

The album features two high-profiled artists of other post-hardcore bands. Lead vocalist Jonny Craig of Dance Gavin Dance is featured on the track "Don't Jump The Shark Before You Save The Whale". According to Camacho, Jonny Craig was introduced to the band through an acquaintance at Uprising Records who had asked him to do a guest appearance on the CD.

The other featured artist, Craig Owens of Chiodos, appears on the track "Same Thing We Do Everyday Pinky." Camacho met Owens through a mutual friend, who had shared Broadway's album with him after it was recorded. Owens reportedly mentioned that it was too bad the album was finished because he would have done guest vocals on it. Broadway re-edited "Same Thing We Do Everyday Pinky" to feature Owens on the track. Another artist that started the band with them was Jason Coleman. He was a vocalist whom gave a great deal of screaming on the track "We Are Paramount".

=== Gentlemen's Brawl (2011–2012) ===
The band's second studio album, titled Gentlemen's Brawl, which was set to be released in March 2011, was postponed due to production reasons. It was stated that the album would be "much softer" and "more punk and rock than anything." Camacho also stated that the album's first single would be "Vagrant Stories". On May 18, 2011, guitarist Jack Fowler left the band to be a full-time member for the band Sleeping with Sirens.

On May 1, 2012, the single "Vagrant Stories" was made available on iTunes and Amazon.com. On May 9, 2012, Broadway released information to Alternative Press, stating that the album release date has been postponed yet again from May 22 to June 19.

The album was officially released on June 19, 2012.

=== Contexture: Gods, Men, & The Infinite Cosmos, dissolution, and reunion (2013–2016) ===
Drummer, Jake Garland, left the band to be a full-time member for the band Memphis May Fire.

It was revealed on May 14, 2014, that the band would begin recording for the third album in Georgia. The reveal was made through social media.

On July 11, 2014, the band announced their departure from Uprising Records and that their next album, Contexture: Gods, Men, & The Infinite Cosmos, will be released independently. Their new single, "Volcano Jack" was released on July 18, 2014.

The album was officially released on March 10, 2015.

Sometime in mid-2015, the band privately parted ways. No official announcement or reason was given.

On January 16, 2016, the band played a reunion show with the original lineup in Orlando, Florida. The band played their debut album Kingdoms in its entirety.

== Band members ==
Final line-up

- Misha Camacho - lead vocals, piano (2008–2015, 2016)
- Felipe Sanchez - lead guitar (2012–2015)
- Sean Connors - rhythm guitar, backing vocals (2009–2015)

Touring and session musicians

- Mikey Amico - drums (2013–2015)
- Marc Cortes - bass guitar (2013–2015)

Former members

- Gabriel Fernandez - bass guitar (2009-2009, 2011-2013, 2016)
- Bryan Camara - guitar (2009–2012, 2016), backing vocals (2016)
- Jake Garland - drums, backing vocals (2007–2012, 2016)
- Jack Fowler - lead guitar (2008–2011, 2016)
- Mike Przymusik - bass guitar (2009–2010)
- Kyle Cogburn - bass guitar (2007–2008)
- Dave Aguilar - rhythm guitar (2007–2008)
- Will Marin - bass guitar (2008–2009)
- Nick Trombino - lead guitar (2007–2009)
- Jason Coleman - lead vocals (2007–2008)
- Greg Shields - lead vocals (2007–2007)

== Discography ==
=== Studio albums ===
Year	Album	Label
2009	Kingdoms	Uprising Records
2012	Gentlemen's Brawl	Uprising Records
2015	Contexture: Gods, Men, & The Infinite Cosmos	Self-released

== Videography ==
Year	Title	Director(s)
2009	"Same Thing We Do Everyday Pinky" (featuring Craig Owens)	Robby Starbuck
2011	"Last Saturday"	Levon Mergian

== See also ==
- List of alternative rock artists
- List of punk rock bands: 0–K, L–Z
- Music of Florida
