= With Ears to See and Eyes to Hear =

Studio album by Sleeping with Sirens
- Released: March 23, 2010
- Recorded: 2009
- Studio: Chango Gridlock
- Genres: Post-hardcore; metalcore; emo
- Length: 31:10
- Label: Rise
- Producer: Cameron Mizell

Sleeping with Sirens chronology
Demo (2009)	With Ears to See and Eyes to Hear (2010)	Let's Cheers to This (2011)

Singles from With Ears to See and Eyes to Hear
- 1. "You Kill Me (In a Good Way)" Released: April 23, 2010; 2. "If I'm James Dean, Then You're Audrey Hepburn" Released: August 6, 2010; 3. "With Ears to See and Eyes to Hear" Released: September 10, 2010

With Ears to See and Eyes to Hear is the debut studio album by American rock band Sleeping with Sirens. It was released on March 23, 2010, through Rise Records. The album debuted at number 7 on Billboard's Top Heatseekers chart, and at number 36 on Top Independent Albums. It received praise in particular for singer Kellin Quinn's vocals. It is the only album to feature guitarists Brandon McMaster and Nick Trombino.

== Production ==
With Ears to See and Eyes to Hear was recorded at Chango Gridlock Studio with producer Cameron Mizell. Mizell acted as engineer, and mixed and mastered the album.

== Release ==
Following the album's conclusion, they embarked on a tour with We Came as Romans, Broadway and Tides of Man. On November 10, 2009, the band announced they had signed to Rise Records; their debut was schueled for release in early 2010. On February 8, 2010, "The Bomb Dot Com v2.0" was posted on the group's Myspace profile. In March and April, the group toured as part of the Royal Family Tour in the US. With Ears to See and Eyes to Hear was made available for streaming on March 22, before being released through Rise Records the following day. On September 9, a music video was released for "With Ears to See, and Eyes to Hear".

== Critical reception ==
Professional ratings
Review scores
Source	Rating
AbsolutePunk	84%
AllMusic	3.5/5 stars
Alternative Press	1/5 stars

With Ears to See and Eyes to Hear was met with generally positive reviews. Gregory Heaney of AllMusic gave the album a 3.5 out of 5 stars. He praised the vocal ability of singer Kellin Quinn stating, "Quinn, whose soaring tenor not only gives the songs a hopeful, uplifting quality, but shows off a vocal talent that could just as easily be making pop records." He ended remarking, "With Ears to See, and Eyes to Hear is an incredibly solid debut from a band showing plenty of promise right out of the gate."

Jason Schreurs of Alternative Press magazine gave the album a harsher review. He gave the album a one out of 5 stars. He called the album a "nonstop assault of mainstream influences into an emo/metalcore sound that, ultimately, sounds best dirty and raw -- not this trite, juvenile, wimpy ear-candy."

The album sold 25,000 copies in its first week in the US.

== Track listing ==
Track listing per booklet.

No.	Title	Length
1.	"If I'm James Dean, You're Audrey Hepburn"	3:39
2.	"The Bomb Dot Com V2.0"	3:31
3.	"You Kill Me (In a Good Way)"	3:42
4.	"Let Love Bleed Red"	3:42
5.	"Captain Tyin Knots vs Mr Walkway (No Way)"	3:23
6.	"Don't Fall Asleep at the Helm"	2:14
7.	"With Ears to See, and Eyes to Hear"	3:43
8.	"In Case of Emergency, Dial 411"	2:44
9.	"The Left Side of Everywhere"	2:59
10.	"http://www.youtube.com/watch?v=tgMzriO93-Y" ( (Note: "http://www.youtube.com/watch?v=tgMzriO93-Y" is the track title as it appears on the album – a URL to a YouTube video on the band's official channel, entitled "Dance Party", which features the group dancing to "A cause des garçons" by Yelle. Track 10 is no longer found at the listed URL and instead can be found at https://www.youtube.com/watch?v=tgMzriO93-Y when YouTube started using HTTPS, however that remains the official name of the song album. For searching purposes, this track is commonly referred to as Dance Party.))	1:33
Total length:		31:10

== Personnel ==
All credits for With Ears to See and Eyes to Hear are adapted from the album's liner notes.

Sleeping with Sirens

- Kellin Quinn – lead vocals
- Brandon McMaster – lead guitar
- Nick Trombino – rhythm guitar
- Justin Hills – bass
- Gabe Barham – drums

Additional musicians

- Aaron Marsh – additional vocals (track 4)
- Dave Stephens – additional vocals (track 5)

Production and design

- Cameron Mizell – production, mixing, engineering, mastering
- Glenn Thomas – art direction, design

== Charts ==
Chart performance for With Ears to See and Eyes to Hear
Chart (2010)	Peak position
US Heatseekers Albums (Billboard)	7
US Independent Albums (Billboard)	36
