= Lions Lions =

American rock band

- Origin: Boston, Massachusetts
- Genres: Post-hardcore, alternative rock
- Years active: 2008–present
- Members: Joshua Herzer; Brandon Davis; Chris Pulgarin; Isaac Vigil; Derek Vautrinot

Lions Lions is an American post-hardcore band from Boston, Massachusetts.

== History ==
Lions Lions began in 2008 with their first EP titled Direction. The following year the band released their first full-length album titled From What We Believe via Panic Records. In 2010, Lions Lions released an EP titled The Path We Take.

In 2012 the band announced they were releasing their second full-length album, titled To Carve our Names. The album was released on June 19 via Hollywood Waste Records. Also in late December 2012, the band released a digital EP titled Grounded.

In 2013, lead singer Joshua Herzer was a featured artist on "The Heartless" by PVRIS, the closing track from their debut EP, Paris.

In March 2015 Lions Lions released a six-song-EP titled Changing the Definition.

On April 21, 2017, they self-released a full-length album titled Monument.

== Discography ==
=== Studio albums ===
Title	Details
From What We Believe	Released: August 25, 2009; Label: Panic Records; Format: CD
To Carve Our Names	Released: June 14, 2012; Label: Blank Page Empire Records; Format: CD, LP
Monument	Released: April 21, 2017; Label: Self Released; Format: CD

=== EPs ===
Title	Album details
Direction	Released: October 1, 2008; Label: Legacy Maine; Format: CD
The Path We Take	Released: October 26, 2010; Label: Panic Records; Format: CD
Changing The Definition	Released: March 3, 2015; Label: Self Released; Format: CD

=== Singles ===
Title	Year	Album
"Killing Your Grace"	2011	The Path We Take
"Milestones"	2012	To Carve Our Names
"Grounded"	2013	To Carve Our Names
"Locked Out of Heaven"	2013	Non-album single
"Centuries"	2014	Non-album single
"Hear Me Out"	2015	Changing the Definition
"Over With ft. Fredua Boakye"	2015	Changing the Definition
"Between Us"	2015	Monument
"Winter"	2016	Monument
"Standby"	2016	Monument
"Weary Eyes"	2017	Monument
"Circles"	2018	Monument
"Wasted Life"	2021	Non-album single
"Constellations"	2022	Non-album single

== Band members ==
- Joshua Herzer - vocals
- Brandon Davis - guitar
- Chris Pulgarin - bass/vocals
- Isaac Vigil - guitar
- Derek Vautrinot - drums

== Past members ==
- Daniel Poulin - vocals
- Van Truong - guitar
- Johnny Kay - bass/vocals
- Phil Bjorkman - drums
- Brian Cauti - drums
- Nick Sjostrom - drums
