= Sleeping with Sirens =

American rock band

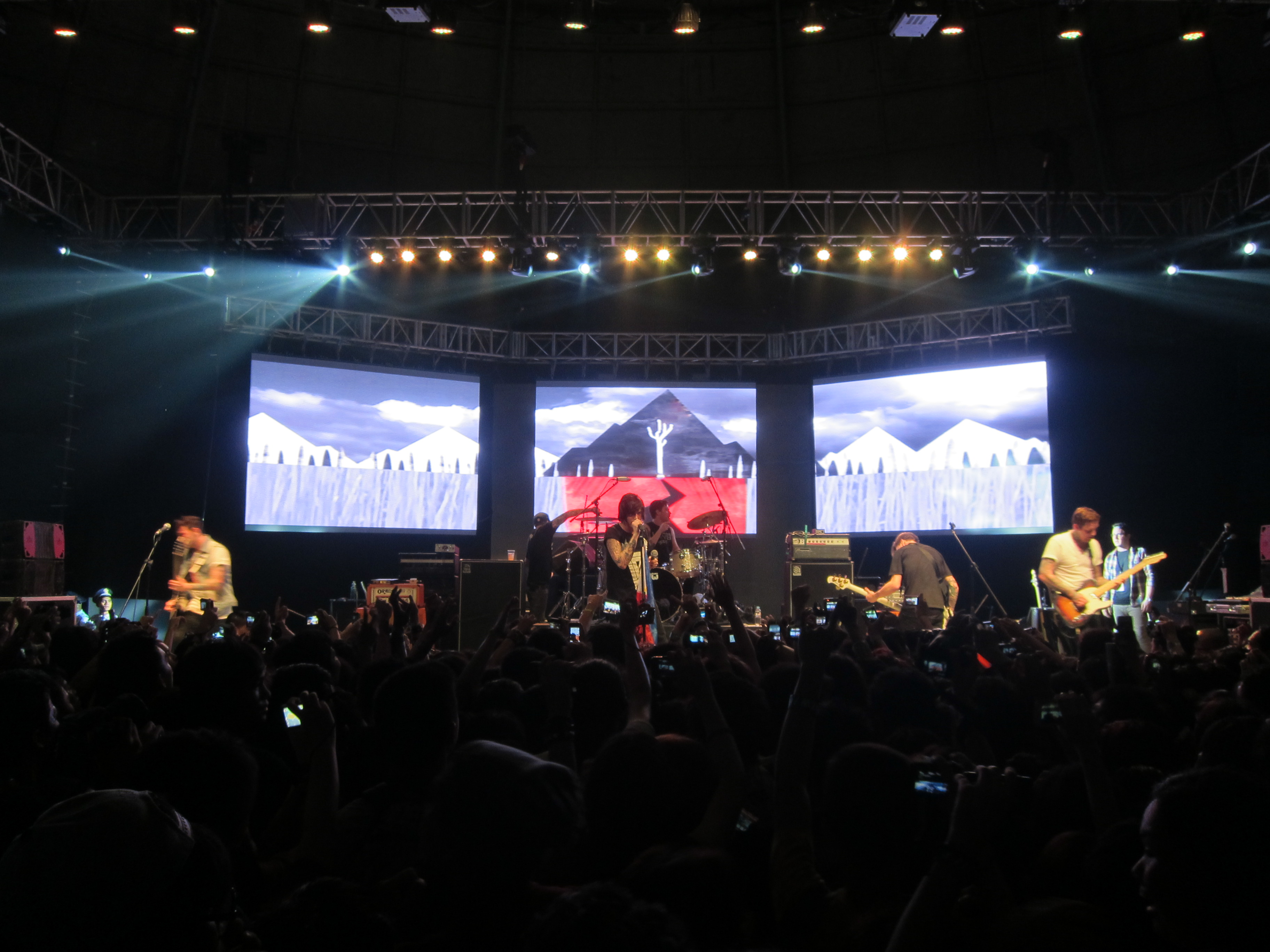
- Sleeping with Sirens performing at the SM City North EDSA Skydome in the Philippines, 2013

Background information
- Origin: Orlando, Florida, U.S.
- Genres: Post-hardcore; metalcore; pop-punk; emo; alternative rock; pop rock
- Works: Sleeping with Sirens discography
- Years active: 2009–present
- Labels: Rise; Epitaph; Warner Bros.; Sumerian
- Members: Kellin Quinn; Justin Hills; Nick Martin; Matty Best; Tony Pizzuti
- Past members: Brian Calzini; Paul Russell; Alex Kaladjian; Dave Aguliar; Nick Trombino; Brandon McMaster; Jesse Lawson; Gabe Barham; Jack Fowler
- Website: sirensmusic.co

Sleeping with Sirens is an American rock band originally formed in Orlando, Florida. The band currently consists of Kellin Quinn (lead vocals), Justin Hills (bass guitar), Nick Martin (rhythm guitar, backing vocals), Matty Best (drums, percussion), and Tony Pizzuti (lead guitar, backing vocals). The band was formed in 2009 by Nick Trombino of Broadway and Brandon McMaster. The group is currently signed to Rise Records and have released eight full-length studio albums, one live album, and one acoustic EP.

The band rose to fame with their song "If I'm James Dean, You're Audrey Hepburn", the lead single from their debut album, With Ears to See and Eyes to Hear, which was released in 2010, through Rise Records. Their second album, Let's Cheers to This, was released in 2011 and became a breakout for the band, thanks to the popular single "If You Can't Hang", which was certified double platinum by the Recording Industry Association of America (RIAA) for selling 2 million copies in the US. The group's third album, Feel, was released on June 4, 2013 and their last album to be released on Rise Records. And it was debuted at No. 3 on the US Billboard 200, and a fourth album, entitled Madness, was released on March 17, 2015, through Epitaph Records and spawned the single "Kick Me". Their fifth studio album, Gossip, was released on September 22, 2017, on Warner Bros. Records. Their sixth studio album, How It Feels to Be Lost, was released on September 6, 2019, through Sumerian Records. Their seventh studio album, Complete Collapse, was released on October 14, 2022. Their eighth studio album, An Ending in Itself, was released on June 12, 2026.

The group is known primarily for the versatility of Quinn's leggero tenor vocal range, along with the heavy sound used on their early work and the pop influences they used later into their career.

== History ==
=== Formation and line-up changes (2009) ===
A few months before the release of Broadway’s debut album Kingdoms, guitarist Nick Trombino left the band to start Sleeping with Sirens alongside Brandon McMaster with whom he previously played and wrote guitar with prior to leaving Broadway. According to McMaster, the two found and recruited vocalist Kellin Quinn from his video performance on For All We Know's “Jesus in The Southern Sky” on YouTube. Later, Trombino brought in vocalist Brian Calzini of Paddock Park to the band, initially wanting both Quinn and Calzini (on clean and harsh vocals respectively) to be the frontmen together. Around the same time, the band got Dave Aguliar on guitar, Paul Russel on bass, and Alex Kaladjian on drums.

According to Calzini, both he and Quinn wrote the demos of “Big Gulps Huh? ...Well, See You Later” and “The Bomb Dot Com” in Chango Studios, Orlando, Florida. On the day before he was supposed to record his vocals, Trombino informed him in a phone call that Quinn did not want to have dual frontmen in the band and let him go. Later, Quinn replaced Aguliar, Russel, and Kaladjian with former For All We Know bandmates Justin Hills on bass and Gabe Barham on drums. According to Quinn, the decision was made because he had thought they were not the right fit for the band at the time.

The band was initially going to be signed to Tragic Hero Records before Rise Records bought them out of the contract. Later, the band got Dave Shapiro as their booking agent and The Artery Foundation as their management company.

=== With Ears to See and Eyes to Hear (2009–2010) ===
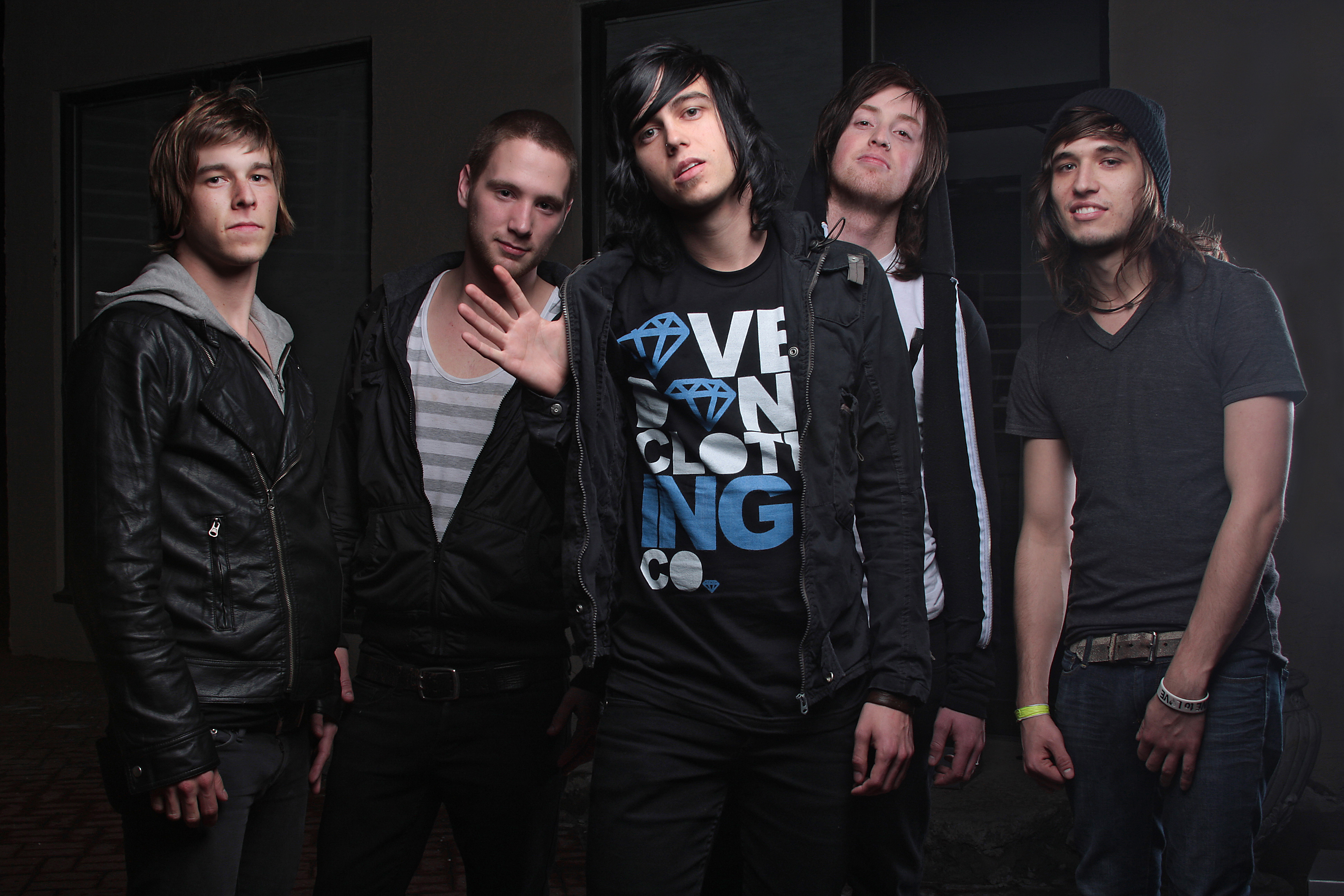
Sleeping With Sirens in 2010.

After signing to Rise, founder and then-owner Craig Ericson wanted the band to make a full-length album, leading them to scrap the debut EP they were initially planning to do. With less than two weeks to make a full-length, the group made four to five more songs to fit the required ten song slot for their debut album. Quinn described the writing process as challenging, as there were "a lot of different ideas being mashed together". According to Quinn, Trombino and McMaster were not very familiar working with Hills and Barham for the album, and vice versa.

On November 10, 2009, the band publicly announced their signing to Rise and the completion of their debut album. Following its completion, the group embarked on a tour with Broadway, We Came as Romans, and Tides of Man. At some point before the album’s release, Trombino left the band and was replaced by former For All We Know guitarist Jesse Lawson.

On February 8, 2010, the group released "The Bomb Dot Com V2.0" on their Myspace page. On March 22, 2010, the album was made available for streaming through their Myspace page, a day ahead of its official release. Later, throughout March and April of 2010, the band went to tour with From First to Last, Eyes Set to Kill, Confide, and Black Veil Brides for the Royal Family tour.

The band's first album, With Ears to See and Eyes to Hear, was officially released on March 23, 2010, alongside the lead single “If I’m James Dean, You’re Audrey Hepburn”. The single was later certified platinum by the RIAA on April 2, 2026. The album was produced by Cameron Mizell, featuring guest vocals from Aaron Marsh of Copeland on “Let Love Bleed Red” and Dave Stephens of We Came as Romans on “Captain Tyin Knots vs Mr Walkway (No Way)”. It debuted at No. 7 on Billboard's Top Heatseekers chart and at No. 36 on Top Independent Albums. The album’s title is a play on the biblical phrase “eyes to see and ears to hear”, which is a nod to Quinn’s religious background and influence. On September 9, 2010, the music video for “With Ears to See, and Eyes to Hear” was released.

=== Let's Cheers to This and acoustic EP (2011–2012) ===
On April 7, 2011, the band released "Do It Now Remember It Later", the first single off of the band's new album. Later in the month on April 28, the next single "Fire" was released. The band's second album Let's Cheers to This was released on May 10, 2011. On June 26, 2012, the band released its first acoustic EP, If You Were a Movie, This Would Be Your Soundtrack. On October 21, 2012, Sleeping with Sirens released a new single called "Dead Walker Texas Ranger" as a Halloween special.

=== Feel (2013–2014) ===
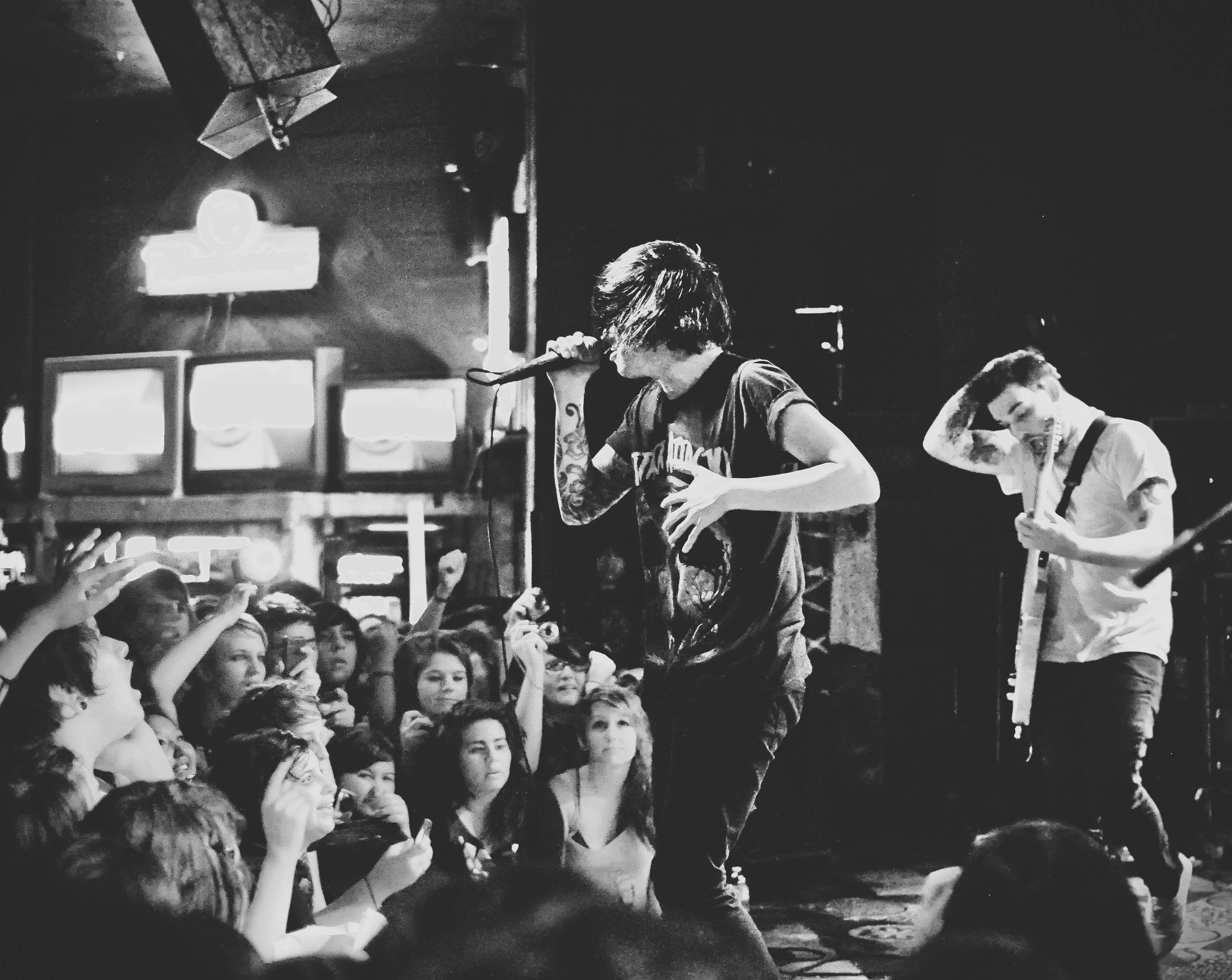
Sleeping with Sirens live at Tucson, Arizona, in 2013.

In January 2013, the band entered the studio to record its follow up to Let's Cheers to This with an estimated release date of mid-2013. On April 23, 2013, the band released a new single called "Low" and revealed the new album's title as Feel and release date as June 4, 2013. In support of the new album, the band will be playing Kia main stage at the Vans Warped Tour 2013. On May 21, the band released the second single from Feel, "Alone" Featuring Machine Gun Kelly.

On August 4, the band announced that it would be headlining a tour titled the Feel This Tour in support of the album Feel. Memphis May Fire, Breathe Carolina, Issues, and Our Last Night supported the tour on selected dates.

On October 16, 2013, guitarist Jesse Lawson announced his departure from the band, citing his desire to spend more time with his family and start a new musical venture. After Lawson's amicable departure the band tapped Nick Martin (formerly of D.R.U.G.S. and Underminded) to fill in on guitar on the band's upcoming UK/EU Feel tour.

=== Wasted Generation, Madness, and live album (2014–2016) ===
On July 6, 2014, the band released pictures of the band members in the studio recording new music with John Feldmann. On July 21, 2014, the band announced that it would be headlining a world tour alongside Pierce the Veil, with supporting acts Beartooth and This Wild Life. On August 8, 2014, the band members announced that the band had parted ways with Rise Records and working on as an independent band. However, on November 10, 2014, it was announced on Alternative Press that the band signed to Epitaph Records and released a new single called "Kick Me". The band followed the release of "Kick Me", with its single "We Like It Loud", on New Year's Day. It was available for free download for twenty four hours through the band's website.

=== Gossip (2017–2018) ===
The band's next album, Gossip was released on September 22, 2017. They began their worldwide, Up Close and Personal Gossip tour, in October 2017 with special guests The White Noise, Palaye Royale and Chase Atlantic. Starting in May 2018, Sleeping with Sirens began the European leg of the tour with Chase Atlantic and Chapel.

=== How It Feels to Be Lost (2019–2020) ===
On June 19, 2019, the band released the single "Leave It All Behind", which is closer to their older sound than the poppier sound of Gossip, and announced their sixth studio album, How It Feels to Be Lost. It was the band's first release under Sumerian Records. On July 19, 2019, the band released the album's second single, "Break Me Down." On August 8, 2019, the band released the album's third single, "Agree to Disagree."

Longtime drummer Gabe Barham departed the band on September 1, 2019. Shortly after, it was announced that Matty Best (of Tonight Alive) would be taking over drumming duties for the band.

On April 9, 2020, lead guitarist Jack Fowler teased a short clip from a heavy and yet-to-be-released song.

On July 24, 2020, band released a new single that Jack Fowler teased before, "Talking to Myself", with an accompanying lyric video. The band announced the release of a deluxe version of the album "How It Feels To Be Lost", which came out on August 21, 2020.

=== Complete Collapse (2021–2023) ===
On June 2, 2021, the band released the single "Bloody Knuckles" from their upcoming album. Just over a year later, on June 22, 2022, the band released their second single called "Crosses" featuring Spencer Chamberlain from Underoath whilst also announcing their seventh studio album Complete Collapse, which was released on October 14, 2022.

On July 14, 2022, guitarist Jack Fowler announced he had departed the band, having contributed to the album prior to the announcement. He is currently a touring guitarist for country artist/rapper Jelly Roll. Former the Word Alive guitarist Tony Pizzuti was recruited as the lead guitarist for the band.

On August 11, 2022, the band released two singles, "Let You Down" featuring Charlotte Sands and "Ctrl + Alt + Del".

The single "Complete Collapse" was released on September 14, 2022, alongside an accompanying music video.

The album was released on October 14, 2022, along with "Be Happy," another track from the album, as a single the same day.

Following the release of the album, the band embarked on several headlining tours in support of the album, spanning the United States, Europe, and Australia. These include the Complete Collapse Tour, Ctrl+Alt+Del Tour, EU Tour 2023, and Family Tree Tour. The band also supported The Used on their Fall 2023 tour.

Leading up to the band's tour with The Used, they embarked on a short American headlining tour with Dead American and TX2 as support.

On September 29, 2023, the band released Complete Collapse (Deluxe Edition), including various acoustic versions of songs from the album and a previously unreleased song, "Don't Let the Party Die," which was also released as a single the same day with an accompanying music video.

=== Touring, Audiotree EP, and An Ending in Itself (2024–present) ===
On March 26, 2024, the band announced an anniversary tour in support of their second studio album, Let's Cheers To This, with Holding Absence and Teenage Joans providing support. The American leg of the tour concluded with the band performing at When We Were Young on October 19 and 20.

On October 23, 2024, the band collaborated with Audiotree to release Sleeping With Sirens on Audiotree Live, an EP featuring live performances of five of the band's songs.

On December 3, 2024, Pierce the Veil announced their "I Can't Hear You" tour, with Sleeping With Sirens announced as direct support for the North American leg. In December 2024, the band embarked on a short three-show run in Australia.

On February 14, 2025, Kellin Quinn launched a solo project entitled Haunted Mouths with an album, A Collection of Greetings.

In 2026, the band has been confirmed to be making an appearance at multiple festivals, such as Welcome to Rockville, Inkcarceration Festival, Louder Than Life, Aftershock Festival, and Warped Tour.

On March 17, 2026, the band announced a single titled "An Ending in Itself". The song was released on March 19, 2026, along with a music video. It is their first release after returning to Rise Records.

On April 24, 2026, the band released a new single titled "Forever/Always", along with a music video. On the same date, the album An Ending in Itself was announced, set to release on June 12, 2026. The album's third single, "Paralyzed", was released on May 22, 2026, along with a visualizer. The fourth single, "House of Matches", was released simultaneously with the album on June 12, 2026, along with a music video. To support this release, the band will tour North America in October-November 2026.

On September 23, 2026, the band released an acoustic re-recording of the song "Big Gulps Huh? ...Well, See You Later" seventeen years after its initial release, renamed as "I'm Coming Home (Big Gulps)", following the song becoming viral on TikTok.

== Musical style ==
The band's music has been described as post-hardcore, pop-punk, alternative rock, emo, metalcore, pop screamo, pop, pop rock, screamo, and post-emo. (Note: Post-hardcore: Pop rock: Pop punk: Alternative rock: Metalcore: Emo: Pop: Screamo: Pop screamo: Post-emo:)

The band cites Rancid, Green Day, blink-182, The Used, Finch and the Starting Line as influences. Other influences Kellin Quinn mentioned are Linkin Park, Jimmy Eat World, Fall Out Boy, Oasis, Third Eye Blind, Goo Goo Dolls, Sublime, Sugarcult, Blondie, Paula Abdul, Fleetwood Mac and AC/DC.

== Band members ==
=== Current ===
- Kellin Quinn – lead vocals (2009–present)
- Justin Hills – bass guitar (2009–present)
- Nick Martin – rhythm guitar, backing vocals (2013–present)
- Matty Best – drums, percussion (2019–present)
- Tony Pizzuti – lead guitar, backing vocals (2022–present)

=== Former ===
- Brian Calzini – intended for unclean vocals; writer for the demos of "Big Gulps Huh? ...Well, See You Later" and "The Bomb Dot Com" (2009)
- Dave Aguliar – rhythm guitar (2009)
- Paul Russell – bass guitar (2009)
- Alex Kaladjian – drums, percussion (2009)
- Nick Trombino – rhythm guitar (2009–2010)
- Brandon McMaster – lead guitar, backing vocals (2009–2010)
- Jesse Lawson – rhythm guitar, backing vocals (2010–2013)
- Gabe Barham – drums, percussion (2009–2019)
- Jack Fowler – lead guitar (2010–2022)

=== Touring ===
- Alex Howard – rhythm guitar, backing vocals, keyboards (2014–2017)

== Discography ==
Studio albums

- With Ears to See and Eyes to Hear (2010)
- Let's Cheers to This (2011)
- Feel (2013)
- Madness (2015)
- Gossip (2017)
- How It Feels to Be Lost (2019)
- Complete Collapse (2022)
- An Ending in Itself (2026)

Live albums

- Live and Unplugged (2016)

Extended plays

- If You Were a Movie, This Would Be Your Soundtrack (2012)

== Awards and nominations ==
=== Alternative Press Music Awards ===
Year	Nominated	Award	Result	Ref.
2014	Kellin Quinn	Best Vocalist	Nominated	
2014	"Alone"	Song of the Year	Nominated	
2014	Feel	Album of the Year	Nominated	
2014	Sleeping with Sirens	Artist of the Year	Nominated	
2015	"Kick Me"	Song of the Year	Won	
2016	Kellin Quinn	Best Vocalist	Nominated	
2016	Madness	Album of the Year	Nominated	
2016	Sleeping with Sirens	Artist of the Year	Nominated	
2016	Jack Fowler	Best Guitarist	Won	
2017	Sleeping with Sirens	Most Dedicated Fanbase	Nominated	

=== iHeartRadio Music Awards ===
Year	Nominated	Award	Result	Ref.
2017	Sleeping with Sirens	Best Underground Alternative Band	Nominated	

=== Kerrang Music Awards ===
Year	Nominated	Award	Result	Ref.
2013	Sleeping with Sirens	Best International Newcomer	Nominated	
2015	Sleeping with Sirens	Best International Band	Nominated	
