= Kellin Quinn =

American musician (born 1986)

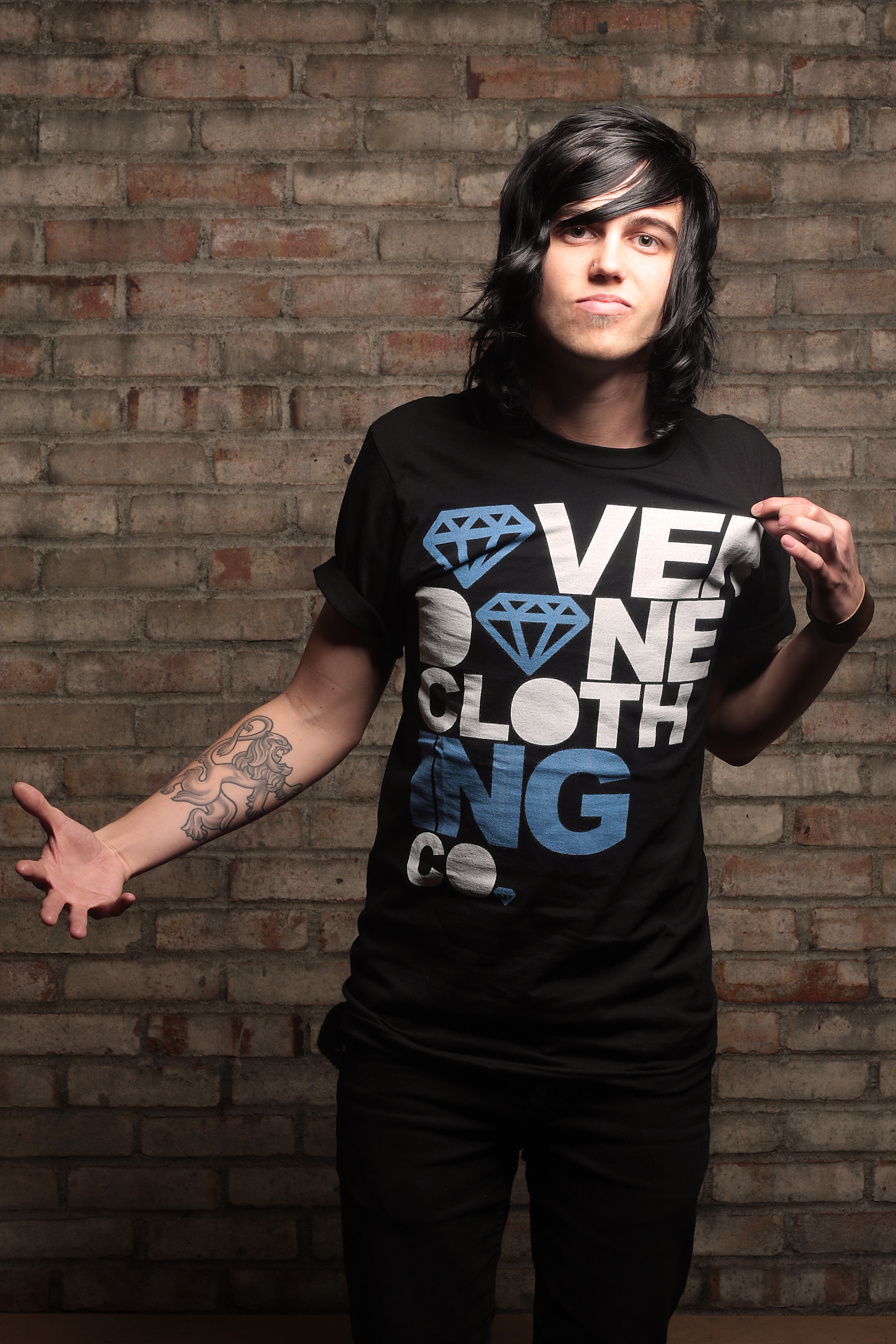
- Quinn in March 2010

Background information
- Also known as: Haunted Mouths
- Born: Kellin Quinn Bostwick; April 24, 1986 (age 40); Medford, Oregon, U.S.
- Genres: Post-hardcore; pop-punk; alternative rock; emo; metalcore; pop rock; pop screamo; indie pop
- Occupations: Singer; songwriter; musician
- Instruments: Vocals; keyboards
- Member of: Sleeping with Sirens
- Formerly of: For All We Know

Kellin Quinn Bostwick (born April 24, 1986) is an American singer and musician. He is the lead vocalist and keyboardist of the rock band Sleeping with Sirens. He is known for his distinctive, high-pitched vocals and for collaborating with other artists, as well as the SEGA Sound Team on the game Sonic Frontiers (2022). Some of his best known collaborations are on the tracks "King for a Day" with Pierce the Veil, and "Love Race" with Machine Gun Kelly. In 2025, Quinn released A Collection of Greetings, his debut studio album under the solo project Haunted Mouths.

== Career ==
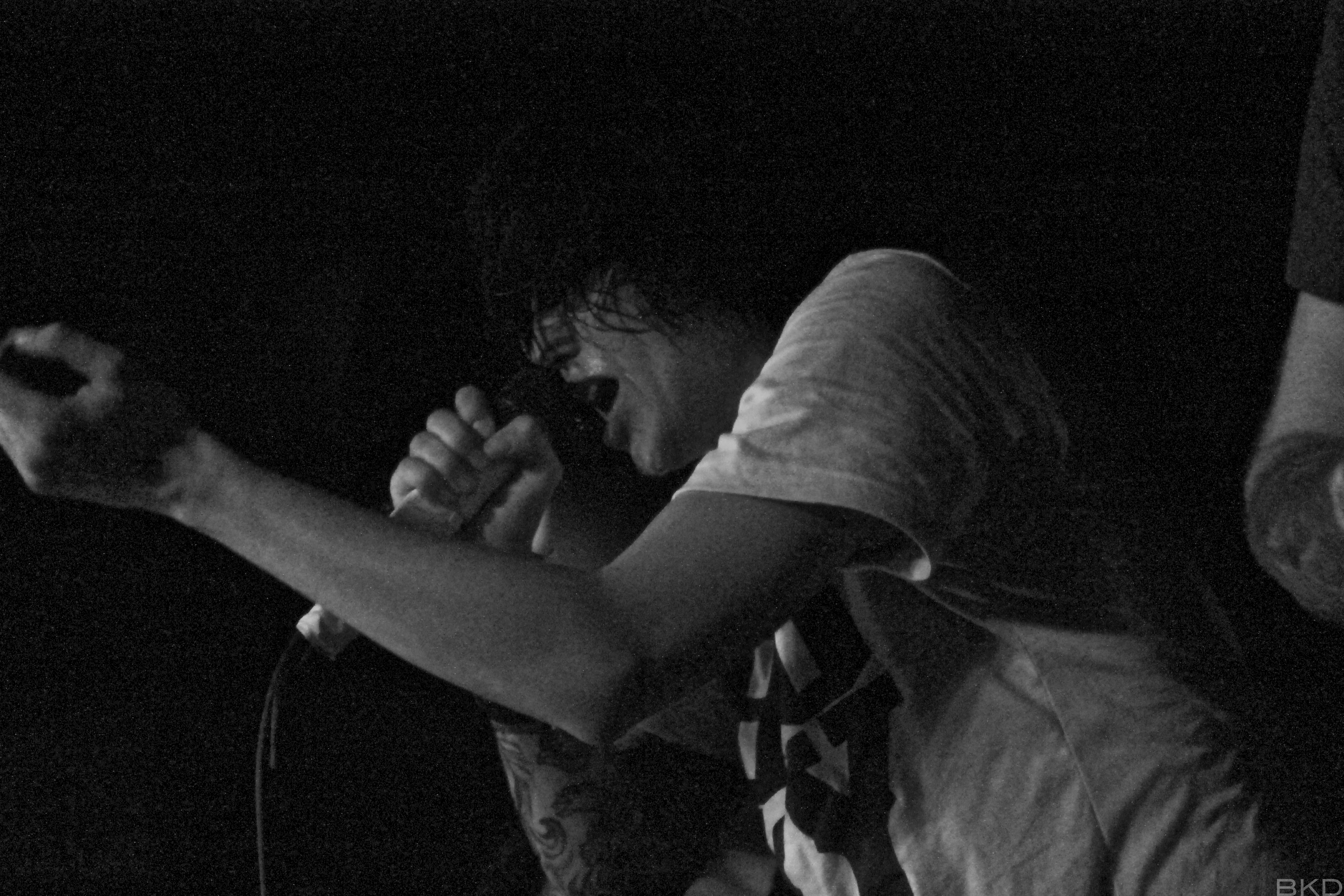
Quinn performing in 2012

Quinn was the vocalist of the band Closer 2 Closure with guitarist and songwriter Titus Lockard from 2005 to 2008, and also auditioned to become the vocalist for Dance Gavin Dance before joining Sleeping with Sirens in 2009. He is also the former vocalist of the Michigan band For All We Know.

The band released their first album in 2010, With Ears to See and Eyes to Hear through Rise Records, which sold 25,000 copies, and reached number seven on the Billboard charts.

Sleeping with Sirens released a single in celebration of Halloween, "Dead Walker Texas Ranger" on October 22, 2012. Quinn participated in the music video for "King for a Day" by the band Pierce the Veil, released in 2012. The single went gold in 2014 and platinum in January 2020. Quinn also collaborated with New Zealand band Written By Wolves on their Collab Project in 2021, sharing lead vocals on the song "Help Me Through the Night".

In 2020, Quinn started a solo side project with producer Cameron Mizell called "Downer Inc" and released a six-track EP called "Whatever This Is".

Quinn appeared on the Sonic Frontiers soundtrack in 2022, acting as lead vocalist for four of the songs on the games soundtrack. Quinn also appeared as a special guest at the September 30, 2023 Sonic Symphony where he performed some of the songs from the soundtrack including "Undefeatable" and "Break Through it All".

Quinn owns his own clothing line, "Anthem Made", and is the founder of "Dreamer Development Group", a support network for aspiring artists like Manic, and Roseburg.

Kellin Quinn collaborated with The Frst on the track “Bruce Lee,” released on June 28, 2023, and “Love In 3D,” which was released on November 1, 2024.

On January 16, 2025, Quinn announced his solo project, Haunted Mouths, and released the single "Further Til We Disappear". His debut studio album under Haunted Mouths, A Collection of Greetings, was released on February 14, 2025. Quinn described the record as a "love letter to [his wife]".

== Personal life ==
Quinn married his girlfriend Katelynne in 2013. The couple have a daughter, and two stepsons from his wife's previous marriage.

== Discography ==
=== Solo albums ===
- A Collection of Greetings (as Haunted Mouths) (2025)

=== Other works ===
| Year | Song | Album | Artist |
|---|---|---|---|
| 2008 | "You Are The Reject Clone" | Unreleased EP | SycAmour |
| 2010 | "The Amazing Atom" | The Secrets to Life | At the Skyline |
| 2010 | "There's a Situation @ the Shore" (feat. Kellin Quinn & Jesse Lawson) | Exotica EP | Lakeland |
| 2010 | "In the Face of Death" | Crashing EP | The Last Word |
| 2011 | "Airplanes Pt. 2" (feat. Kellin Quinn & Tom Denney) | Single | We Are Defiance |
| 2011 | "The Dying Hymn" | My Devil in Your Eyes | The Color Morale |
| 2011 | "Bring On the Empty Horses" | A Hope Remains | Call Us Forgotten |
| 2011 | "Once Upon a Time in Mexico" | Demo Version | Cascades |
| 2012 | "We Fight Fail" | Aerolyn | Aerolyn |
| 2012 | "Miles Away" | Challenger | Memphis May Fire |
| 2012 | "Closer to Becoming a Killer" | When the Way Is Forgotten | She Can't Breathe |
| 2012 | "King for a Day" | Collide with the Sky | Pierce the Veil |
| 2012 | "The Surface Beneath" | Single | Avera |
| 2012 | "Building Coral Castle" | Morals EP | The Words We Use |
| 2012 | "Miles Away (Acoustic)" | Single | Memphis May Fire |
| 2013 | "Swing Life Away (Rise Against cover)" | Black Flag | Machine Gun Kelly |
| 2013 | "Swing Life Away (Acoustic)" (feat. Kellin Quinn & Jesse Lawson) | Single | Machine Gun Kelly |
| 2013 | "500mL" | Morla and the Red Balloon | Time Traveller |
| 2014 | "Fight Back" | Single | Lions Lions |
| 2015 | "Paper Planes" | 35xxxv | One Ok Rock |
| 2015 | "The Chase" | Nerve Endings | Too Close to Touch |
| 2015 | "Into the Rest" | Into the Rest EP | Avion Roe |
| 2016 | "Keep Swingin'" | Youth Authority | Good Charlotte |
| 2016 | "Ma Chérie" | Boom Boom Room (Side A) | Palaye Royale |
| 2019 | "Nobody's Happy" | Single | Fossil Youth |
| 2019 | "RIP'" | Indie Baby | Roseburg |
| 2019 | "Filthy'" | It Begins EP | Ghost Kings |
| 2019 | "The Bottom'" | Single | YULTRON |
| 2019 | "Wolf in Disguise" | Single | It Comes in Waves |
| 2020 | "Into the Dark" | "Brand New Vision" | Point North |
| 2020 | "Upside Down" | New Empire, Vol. 1 | Hollywood Undead |
| 2020 | "Rose Colored Catastrophe" (feat. Kellin Quinn & HJ) | Single | Dear Me |
| 2020 | "Time Bomb" | Resilience | Halflives |
| 2020 | "i luv that u hate me" | Single | Story Untold |
| 2020 | "I'd Rather Be Dumb" | Single | Marlhy |
| 2020 | "Someone Else" | Single | Loveless |
| 2020 | "Drug" | Single | Lonely Spring |
| 2021 | "Last Time" | Single | Sunday Friend |
| 2021 | "I Don't Mind" | Single | The 12th Human |
| 2021 | "Nightmare" | vibes. | Karma Kids |
| 2021 | "Time Bomb" | Single | Paul Bartolome |
| 2021 | "What Isn't Here" | Single | DVDDY & Caslow |
| 2021 | "Mercy" | Heaven Is A Feeling, Hell Is A Place EP | Echoes |
| 2021 | "Wrong" | Single | Five AM |
| 2021 | "Love Race" | Single | Machine Gun Kelly |
| 2021 | "Eating Me Alive" | 1692 | Oh! The Horror |
| 2021 | "Overdramatic" | Bored In America | Exit |
| 2021 | "Help Me Through The Night " | Single | Written By Wolves |
| 2021 | "The Reason" | Single | 1996Montana |
| 2021 | "Messy" | Single | Conquer Divide |
| 2021 | "No Fear" | Single | Amber Liu |
| 2021 | "1 Thing" | Single | Sophie Powers |
| 2021 | "Letters'" | Single | Paleskin |
| 2021 | "The Only Ones" | Black Sky Sunrise | Crashing Atlas |
| 2021 | "Never Ending Nightmare" | This is Your Sign (Part 1) | Citizen Soldier |
| 2021 | "Love You Like I Used To" | Single | 7evin7ins |
| 2022 | "MESS" | Single | GARZI |
| 2022 | "How Could You Do This To Me" | Suckerpunch | Maggie Lindemann |
| 2022 | "Reticent" | You Miss Everything | Colony Collapse |
| 2022 | "Undefeatable" | Sonic Frontiers Original Soundtrack: Stillness & Motion | Tomoya Ohtani |
| 2022 | "Find Your Flame" | Sonic Frontiers Original Soundtrack: Stillness & Motion | Tomoya Ohtani |
| 2022 | "Break Through It All" | Sonic Frontiers Original Soundtrack: Stillness & Motion | Tomoya Ohtani |
| 2022 | "In Extremis" | Pieces EP | Barbie Sailers |
| 2022 | "Atom Bomb" | Single | PRETTY HAVØC |
| 2022 | "Conversation (Kellin Quinn Variant)" | Single | Jack the Underdog |
| 2022 | "Inner Beauty" | Single | Abyss, Watching Me |
| 2023 | "How It Ends" | Single | Cevilain |
| 2023 | "Everything But Faith" | Single | Colorblind |
| 2023 | "Love//Hate" | Diary of a Depressed Creative | Kala |
| 2023 | "Live and Let Die" | Single | Roseview |
| 2023 | "Underneath My Skin" | The Silver Line | ONI |
| 2023 | "Four Leaf Clover" | Single | Down And Out |
| 2023 | "Zombie" | Single | Maybsomeday |
| 2023 | "Bruce Lee" | This Never Happened | The Frst |
| 2023 | "Lonely Together" | Single | BUNNY |
| 2023 | "Fractured" | Phantom Pain EP | Last Night of Solace |
| 2023 | "I'm Here – Revisited" | Sonic Frontiers Expansion Soundtrack: Paths Revisited | Tomoya Ohtani |
| 2023 | "Feasting on Vultures" | Fractured Paradise | Seventh Day Slumber |
| 2023 | "You're on Your Own, Kid" | Single | The Frst |
| 2023 | "FVKD" | Single | NateWantsToBattle |
| 2024 | "Yeah!" (feat. Kellin Quinn & Hyro the Hero) | Single | Like a Storm |
| 2024 | "Love In 3D" (feat. Kellin Quinn, Craig Owens & Aaron Gillespie) | This Never Happened | The Frst |
| 2024 | "Obey" | Atmospherics | Hands Like Houses |
| 2024 | "Paradigm" | Donefore | Donefor |
| 2024 | "Sentence" (feat. Kellin Quinn & Lil Lotus) | Despised Icon | weknewnothing |
| 2024 | "Forever & Always" | Downward Spiral | CZYK |
| 2025 | "cyclical reality" | Single | playd3ad |
| 2025 | "Found" | Home EP | Live Lost |
| 2025 | "Speak Soft X" | Never Happy, Ever After X | As It Is |
| 2025 | "Upside Down" | Single | Keeper |
| 2025 | "Burning Bridges" | Single | N4T! |
| 2025 | "Mirror Soul" | Single | From First to Last |
| 2025 | "Always the King" | X's for Eyes | The Red Jumpsuit Apparatus |
| 2026 | "RX Regicide" | Synthetic Sympathy | Defying Decay |
| 2026 | "sleep paralysis" | Single | Can't Touch the Bottom |
| 2026 | "Liminal" | Single | Midnight Skies |
| 2026 | "Lamb" | Single | Julia Wolf |
| 2026 | "One Last Shot" (feat. Kellin Quinn, Lil Used & Lil Lotus) | Single | Carlo and Friends |
| 2026 | "I'm Bored x" | Single | Waldo |
| 2026 | "clarity" | Single | Daniel Spriggs |
