= Outline in Color =

American post-hardcore band

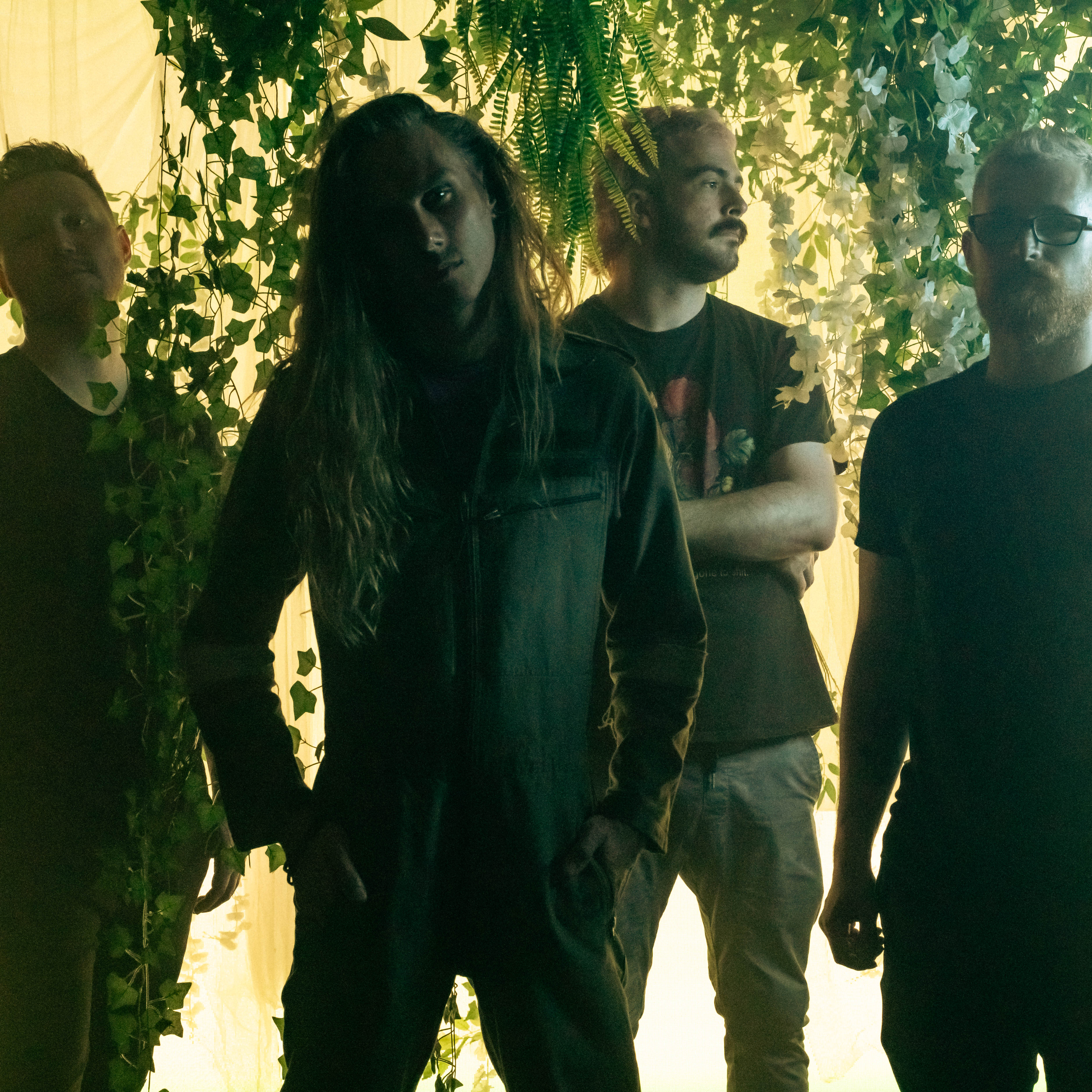
- 2022 Promo Photo

Background information
- Origin: Tulsa, Oklahoma, U.S.
- Genres: Post-hardcore; metalcore
- Years active: 2009-present
- Labels: BRKN; StandBy; Thriller
- Members: Jonathan Grimes; Michael Skaggs; CJ Cochran; Austin McFerrin; Adam Woods
- Past members: Forrest Mankins; Trevor Tatro; Peyton Carvell; K.C. Simonsen; Nick Taylor
- Website: outlineincolor.com

Outline in Color (often abbreviated as OIC) is an American post-hardcore band formed in Tulsa, Oklahoma in 2009. The band consists of clean vocalist and bassist Jonathan Grimes, unclean vocalist Michael Skaggs, guitarist CJ Cochran and drummer Austin McFerrin. They are currently unsigned. The band has released five albums and three EPs, two of which have reached the Billboard charts.

== History ==
=== Formation, first EP and line-up changes (2009–2012) ===
Outline in Color was formed in August 2009 by unclean vocalist Trevor Tatro, clean vocalist Jonathan Grimes, guitarists CJ Cochran and Forrest Mankins, keyboard player Michael Skaggs and drummer Austin McFerrin. On September 28, 2010, they self-released their first EP, produced by Joey Sturgis, with bass parts contributed by Tatro. The six-track self-titled comes with a cover of Lady Gaga's Bad Romance, but is also sold as a five-track digital version on iTunes, with the Lady Gaga cover being sold separately.

In February 2011, Jonathan Grimes announced his departure from the band not wanting to tour in a band at the time. His replacement was K.C. Simonsen, who dropped out of the Berklee College of Music to join the band. In July, the band began recording their first full-length release. Initially, they planned to record it with Tom Denney, but due to schedule issues, they instead worked with Andrew Wade. Around November 2011, Skaggs took on the position of bass player.

=== Jury of Wolves and StandBy Records (2012–2013) ===
In mid-2012, the band released two re-recorded tracks from their EP. "Every Boy Should Collect Knives" was completely re-mixed and "No Bleeding On the Carpet" was given an acoustic rendition. Later in 2012, the band announced their first new single from their upcoming debut album Jury of Wolves. The song, called "I Ain't Afraid of No Ghost", featured Matty Mullins of Memphis May Fire. Two weeks later, the band released the album's title track as a second single. On September 25, Jury of Wolves was released through BRKN Records. The physical US version of the album includes eleven songs, the iTunes version comes with three bonus tracks; an acoustic version of "The Good In Me", a new song called "Tapdance At Knuckle Junction" and a cover of *NSYNC's "It's Gonna Be Me". The Japanese version has a different cover art and includes 15 songs; all 14 of the iTunes version and the re-recorded version of "Every Boy Should Collect Knives".

In mid-2013, the band signed to StandBy Records and released their first stand-alone single with the label in October, "I Am My Own Invention".

=== Masks and Fever Frenzy (2014–2015) ===
In 2014, the band announced their second album to be released in June of that year, with Cameron Mizell being the producer. Masks was released on June 23, 2014. This was the first time Jonathan Grimes had sung with the band since 2011; featuring on the track "Water In the Desert". The physical edition of the album has twelve songs, although the last song, entitled "55", isn't listed on the release. The iTunes version of the album's first song is called "Between the Devil and the Deep Blue Sea", (this is alternatively titled as "Live to Tell" on physical copies). The Japanese version of the album has different cover art and includes two bonus tracks; acoustic versions of "I've Had This Dream Before" and "The Souvenir Scheme". The album also has a Remastered edition, taking the same cover art from the Japanese version, it is identical to the original album but all songs have been remastered by the band's guitarist CJ Cochran.

In February 2015, the band released a Japanese only single called Fever Frenzy, accompanied by a music video. This was later added to Spotify along with the remastered edition of Masks.

=== Struggle and Simonsen's Departure (2015–2016) ===
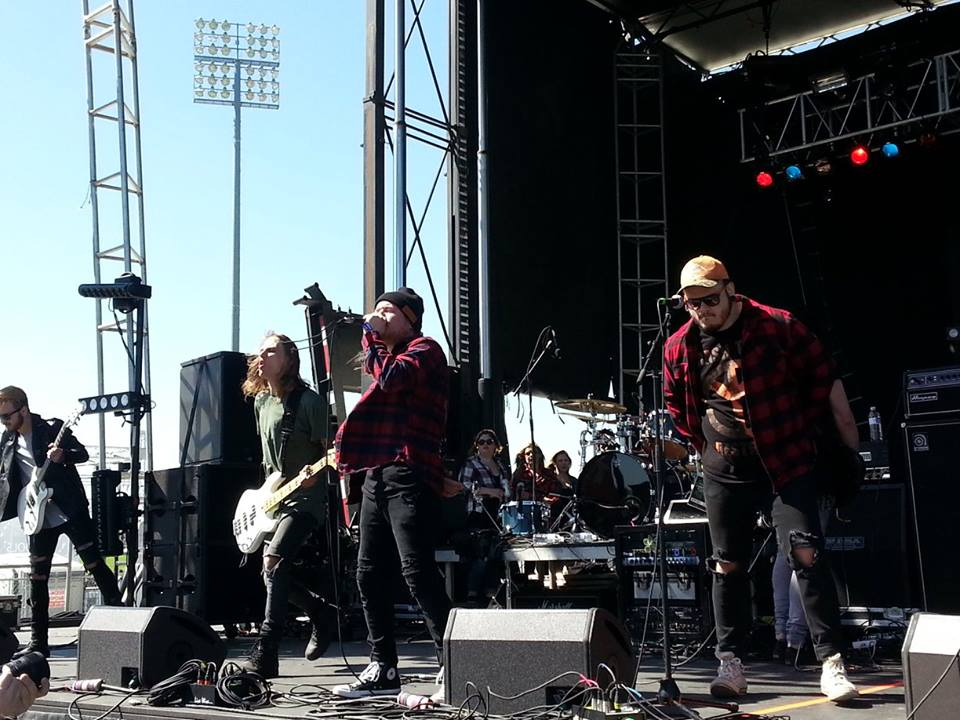
Outline in Color performing at South by So What in 2016

In July 2015, the band announced that their third album, Struggle, was to be released sometime in early 2016. The first single was released in February 2016, entitled "Eat Your Heart Out", and the second single, "Alive", was released only days later. Struggle, again produced by Cameron Mizell, was released on March 11, 2016. After the release of Struggle, the band ended their contract with StandBy Records. In December 2016, the band released a statement on Facebook, saying that they had parted ways with clean vocalist K.C. Simonsen.

=== Shamecult and return of Grimes (2017–2018) ===
In early 2017, the band announced a side project with most of its members called "Shamecult". Their first and only EP was released through Stay Sick Recordings in November 2017. In September 2017, the band announced they had reunited with previous clean vocalist Jonathan Grimes and released three new singles; Three Knee Deep, Year 8 and an acoustic version of The Chase Scene. In January 2018, the band released their cover of Kesha's "Learn to Let Go" as part of We Are Triumphant's new cover album, Got You Covered, Vol. 2. Outline In Color toured Japan in June 2018 with rapper Kyle Lucas. On September 3, 2018, they released a cover of My Chemical Romance's song "Thank You For the Venom" as a part of We Are Triumphant's cover album Three Cheers For Sweet Revenge.

=== Outline in Color, Coast Is Clear and line-up changes (2019–2022) ===
On January 11, 2019, the band announced that their new album, entitled Outline In Color (not to be confused with the EP of the same name), would be released on February 8 and that the first 250 copies pre-ordered would come with autographs from the band. The first song released along with the announcement was "Broken Record". On January 25, the band released the second single of the album, entitled Not Enough. The album itself was released in physical and digital version on February 8, 2019. It was the last album to feature drummer Nick Taylor, who left the band in July that year. His replacement for the live shows was original drummer Austin McFerrin, who then re-joined the band in September 2019. On November 6, unclean vocalist Trevor Tatro announced his departure from the band due to personal problems. His position was filled in by bassist Michael Skaggs. In turn, clean vocalist Jonathan Grimes took on Skaggs' role as bassist while still doing clean vocals.

Their first song as a quartet, titled "Ghost of You", was released on February 28, 2020. At the same time, the band also completed their next release, a five-track EP titled "Imposter Syndrome". Its first single, titled "Breaking the Silence", was released along with a music video on May 15, 2020. Also published on that day were the EP's title, cover, tracklist and release date of July 10, as well as the title and release date of the EP's second single, "Alibi", which was released on June 6. In December 2021, Outline in Color released the non-album single "Snakebit", their debut on their new label Thriller Records. The following year saw the release of "Quicksand", "Do Your Worst" and "Bitter", three singles that led up to the release of the band's fifth album, titled Coast Is Clear, on October 14, 2022. A tour with Electric Callboy and Attack Attack! was announced as well, lasting from October 12 to November 5, 2022.

== Members ==
Current

- CJ Cochran – lead guitar (2014–2015, 2016–present), rhythm guitar (2009–2022)
- Michael Skaggs – unclean vocals, clean vocals (2019–present), keyboards (2009–2011), bass (2011–2019), backing vocals (2009–2019)
- Jonathan Grimes – clean vocals (2009–2011, 2017–present), bass (2019–present)
- Austin McFerrin – drums (2009–2014, 2019–present)
- Adam Woods – rhythm guitar (2022–present)

Former

- Forrest Mankins – lead guitar (2009–2014)
- Trevor Tatro – unclean vocals (2009–2019), clean vocals (2016–2019), studio bass (2009–2011)
- K.C. Simonsen – clean vocals (2011–2016)
- Peyton Carvell – lead guitar (2015–2016)
- Nick Taylor – drums (2015–2019)

Timeline

== Discography ==
=== Albums ===
- Jury of Wolves (2012)
- Masks (2014) [#37 Heatseekers]
- Struggle (2016) [#10 Heatseekers, #18 Hard Rock albums, #36 Independent albums]
- Outline in Color (2019)
- Coast Is Clear (2022)

=== EPs ===
- Outline In Color (2010)
- Imposter Syndrome, Pt. 1 (2020) [#190 Independent albums, #88 Top New Artist, #45 Hard Rock albums]
- Imposter Syndrome, Pt. 2 (2021)

=== Singles ===
- "Bad Romance" (Lady Gaga cover, 2010)
- "No Bleeding On the Carpet" (Acoustic Version) (2012)
- "Every Boy Should Collect Knives, Vol. 2" (2012)
- "Jury of Wolves" (2012)
- "I Am My Own Invention (Tauscher.0)" (2013)
- "Fever Frenzy" (2015)
- "Eat Your Heart Out" (2016)
- "Alive" (2016)
- "Year 8" (2017)
- "Three Knee Deep" (2017)
- "The Chase Scene" (Acoustic Version) (2017)
- "Broken Record" (2019)
- "Not Enough" (2019)
- "Ghost of You" (2020)
- "Breaking the Silence" (2020)
- "Alibi" (2020)
- "Punishment" (featuring Kalie Wolfe of Rivals) (2020)
- "Papercuts" (2020)
- "Cry" (The Used cover, 2020)
- "Points of Authority" (Linkin Park cover, 2020)
- "Poison Prescribed As Medicine" (2020)
- "Todays's Western" (2021)
- "Goodbye to My Friends" (2021)
- "Why Should You Survive" (2021)
- "Snakebit" (2021)
- "Quicksand" (featuring Michael Swank of Foxera) (2022)
- "Do Your Worst" (with Loveless) (2022)
- "Bitter" (2022)
- "Stay Away" (with Avoid) (2022)

=== Other appearances ===
- A Wish to End the Tragedy (2011) - "Mothership"
- A Blkheart Christmas Vol 1 (2011) - "No Bleeding On the Carpet"
- Got You Covered, Vol. 2 (2018) - "Learn to Let Go" (Originally performed by Kesha)
- Three Cheers for Sweet Revenge: An Encore (2018) - "Thank You for the Venom" (Originally performed by My Chemical Romance)
- The Black Parade: Reimagined (2021) - "I Don't Love You" (Originally performed by My Chemical Romance)
- DEATH CODE – Black Heart (2023) - "Black Heart"
- Scarlet Bandit – Lose Your Blues (2024) - “Hope This Finds You Well”
- FOXCULT - THE AMETHYST DRIFT (2024) - "ASTRAL GALLERY"
