= Broken (Memphis May Fire album) =

Studio album by Memphis May Fire
- Released: November 16, 2018
- Recorded: 2017–18
- Studio: The Hideout Studios
- Genre: Nu metal; alternative metal; hard rock
- Length: 31:32
- Label: Rise
- Producer: Kane Churko; Kellen McGregor; Drew Fulk

Memphis May Fire chronology
This Light I Hold (2016)	Broken (2018)	Remade in Misery (2022)

Singles from Broken
- 1. "The Old Me" Released: September 19, 2018; 2. "Live Another Day" Released: March 20, 2019; 3. "Heavy is the Weight" Released: March 20, 2019

Professional ratings
Review scores
Source	Rating
Distorted Sound	9/10
HM Magazine	3.5/5 stars

Broken is the sixth studio album by American metalcore band Memphis May Fire. It was released on November 16, 2018, on Rise Records. The album serves as a follow-up to the band's fifth studio album, This Light I Hold (2016). It is the group's first studio album since 2011's The Hollow to not feature guitarist Anthony Sepe since his departure in 2017. The album as produced by Kane Churko, the band's guitarist Kellen McGregor, and Drew Fulk and was recorded at The Hideout Studios.

The album was supported by the lead single "The Old Me", which was released on September 19, 2018. In support of the album, the group embarked on Atreyu's headlining U.S. tour in November and December 2018.

The album was the band's first album since the 2009 debut album Sleepwalking to not chart on the Billboard 200. However, "The Old Me" charted and peaked at number 19 on the Billboard Mainstream Rock Songs chart in March 2019.

== Track listing ==
No.	Title	Length
1.	"The Old Me"	3:09
2.	"Watch Out"	2:43
3.	"Sell My Soul"	3:24
4.	"Who I Am"	2:57
5.	"Heavy Is the Weight" (featuring Andy Mineo)	3:28
6.	"Over It"	2:36
7.	"Fool"	3:11
8.	"Mark My Words"	2:40
9.	"You & Me"	4:14
10.	"Live Another Day"	3:10
Total length:		31:32

== Personnel ==
Memphis May Fire

- Matty Mullins – lead vocals, keyboards
- Kellen McGregor – guitars
- Cory Elder – bass
- Jake Garland – drums

Production

- Kellen McGregor – producer, composer
- Matty Mullins – composer
- Drew Fulk – mixing, mastering
- Kane Churko – producer, composer
- Tristan Hardin – engineer
- Andy Mineo – featured vocals (on "Heavy Is the Weight")
- Alan Ashcraft – creative director
- Kevin Moore – design, layout
