= This Light I Hold =

Studio album by Memphis May Fire
- Released: October 28, 2016
- Recorded: Chango Studios
- Genre: Metalcore; post-hardcore; hard rock
- Length: 48:50
- Label: Rise
- Producer: Matt Good

Memphis May Fire chronology
Unconditional (2014)	This Light I Hold (2016)	Broken (2018)

Singles from This Light I Hold
- 1. "Carry On" Released: August 28, 2016; 2. "This Light I Hold" Released: September 23, 2016; 3. "Wanting More" Released: April 27, 2017

Professional ratings
Review scores
Source	Rating
Alternative Press	2/5 stars
Hit the Floor	5/10
HM Magazine	3.5/5 stars
Kill Your Stereo	40/100
New Noise Magazine	4/5 stars

This Light I Hold is the fifth studio album by American metalcore band Memphis May Fire. It was released on the October 28, 2016 by Rise Records. The album debuted at number 42 on the Billboard 200 chart.

It is the last album to have rhythm guitarist Anthony Sepe before his departure in January 2017.

== Release and promotion ==
The band premiered the first single "Carry On" on BBC Radio 1 on August 28, 2016. On September 23, 2016, Memphis May Fire released the title track and second single to their new album, "This Light I Hold," which features Jacoby Shaddix (Papa Roach), accompanied with a music video. It was also used as one of the theme songs for NXT’s NXT TakeOver: San Antonio

== Track listing ==
No.	Title	Length
1.	"Out of It"	4:14
2.	"Carry On"	3:23
3.	"Wanting More"	3:47
4.	"Sever the Ties"	3:33
5.	"The Enemy"	3:51
6.	"This Light I Hold" (featuring Jacoby Shaddix of Papa Roach)	4:08
7.	"That's Just Life"	3:37
8.	"Letting Go"	3:30
9.	"The Antidote"	3:35
10.	"Better Things"	3.57
11.	"Not Over Yet" (featuring Larry Soliman of My American Heart)	3:50
12.	"Unashamed"	3:29
13.	"Live It Well"	3:56
Total length:		48:50

== Personnel ==
Memphis May Fire

- Matty Mullins - lead vocals, keyboards
- Kellen McGregor - guitars
- Anthony Sepe - guitars
- Cory Elder - bass
- Jake Garland - drums

Additional Personnel

- Jacoby Shaddix (Papa Roach) - guest vocals on "This Light I Hold"
- Larry Soliman (My American Heart) - guest vocals on "Not Over Yet"

Production

- Matt Good - Producer, mixing
- Ryan Daminson - Engineer
- Cameron Mizell - Vocal Producer
- Taylor Larson - Mastering
