= Remade in Misery =

Studio album by Memphis May Fire
- Released: June 3, 2022
- Recorded: 2020–2021
- Genre: Metalcore; alternative metal; post-hardcore
- Length: 37:31
- Label: Rise
- Producer: Kellen McGregor

Memphis May Fire chronology
Broken (2018)	Remade in Misery (2022)	Shapeshifter (2025)

Singles from Remade in Misery
- 1. "Blood & Water" Released: June 3, 2021; 2. "Death Inside" Released: July 14, 2021; 3. "Bleed Me Dry" Released: August 27, 2021; 4. "Somebody" Released: December 4, 2021; 5. "Left for Dead" Released: December 20, 2021; 6. "The American Dream" Released: January 14, 2022; 7. "Make Believe" Released: February 18, 2022; 8. "Only Human" Released: April 1, 2022; 9. "Your Turn" Released: May 6, 2022

Remade in Misery is the seventh studio album by American metalcore band Memphis May Fire. It was released on June 3, 2022, through Rise Records and was produced by Kellen McGregor, the band's guitarist. The album was released four years after the band's sixth studio album, Broken (2018), their longest gap between albums and marks a return to their metalcore and post-hardcore sound.

== Background and promotion ==
In early 2020, frontman Matty Mullins stated he had started work on new Memphis May Fire music as well as his solo material, and that it would mark a return to their heavier roots. On June 3, 2021, the band released a new single titled "Blood & Water" which confirmed a return to their earlier, heavier sound.

Over the course of late 2021 and early 2022, the band released more singles; "Death Inside", "Bleed Me Dry", "Somebody", "Left for Dead", and "The American Dream". On February 18, 2022, the band released another single entitled "Make Believe" whilst also announcing the album itself along with the track list, cover art, and release date. On April 1, 2022, the band released another single entitled "Only Human" featuring AJ Channer from Fire from the Gods.

The album's final pre-release single "Your Turn" was released on May 6, 2022. Vocalist Matty Mullins commented on the song:

"'Your Turn' is our ninth and final single before the album comes out as a whole. It's been such a wild and rewarding ride to release music in such a non-traditional way, especially because even this far along, we're still so excited about each and every song! We're thrilled to share that we will be donating 100% of the proceeds from the 'Your Turn' tee in our merch store to Food for the Hungry, whose mission is to end all forms of human poverty by providing life-changing development programs, disaster relief, and advocacy. Our donation will be specifically allocated toward their relief efforts for those affected by the war in Ukraine."

== Critical reception ==
Professional ratings
Review scores
Source	Rating
Ghost Cult	7/10
HM	3.5/5 stars
Jesus Freak Hideout	4/5 stars
New Noise	4/5 stars
Wall of Sound	8/10

The only two non-single tracks in the album are "Misery" and "The Fight Within", both of which were stated in the HM review for the album to "offer an encouraging perspective of the growth that comes from the hardships of life. In a genre that can dwell on only the negatives of the human experience, Memphis May Fire shines the attention on the light at the end of the tunnel."

== Track listing ==
All lyrics are written by Memphis May Fire; all music is composed by Memphis May Fire

Remade in Misery track listing
No.	Title	Length
1.	"Blood & Water"	3:50
2.	"Bleed Me Dry"	3:22
3.	"Somebody"	3:20
4.	"Death Inside"	3:06
5.	"The American Dream"	3:30
6.	"Your Turn"	3:21
7.	"Make Believe"	3:49
8.	"Misery"	3:12
9.	"Left for Dead"	3:05
10.	"Only Human" (featuring AJ Channer of Fire from the Gods)	3:02
11.	"The Fight Within"	3:54
Total length:		37:31

== Personnel ==
Memphis May Fire

- Matty Mullins – lead vocals, composition
- Kellen McGregor – guitars, backing vocals, keyboards, programming, production, composition
- Cory Elder – bass
- Jake Garland – drums

Additional musicians

- AJ Channer of Fire from the Gods – guest vocals on track 10

Additional personnel

- Cameron Mizell – vocal production
- Brad Blackwood – engineering
- Akil Channer and Cody Quistad – composition
