= Shapeshifter (Memphis May Fire album) =

Studio album by Memphis May Fire
- Released: March 28, 2025
- Recorded: 2023–2024
- Genre: Metalcore; alternative metal; post-hardcore
- Length: 30:02
- Label: Rise
- Producer: Kellen McGregor

Memphis May Fire chronology
Remade in Misery (2022)	Shapeshifter (2025)

Singles from Shapeshifter
- 1. "Chaotic" Released: April 17, 2024; 2. "Paralyzed" Released: June 26, 2024; 3. "Necessary Evil" Released: July 31, 2024; 4. "Infection" Released: September 4, 2024; 5. "Hell Is Empty" Released: October 9, 2024; 6. "Shapeshifter" Released: November 20, 2024; 7. "Overdose" Released: January 8, 2025; 8. "The Other Side" Released: February 19, 2025

Professional ratings
Review scores
Source	Rating
Jesus Freak Hideout	4/5 stars
Distorted Sound	6/10
Kerrang!	3/5 stars
Out of Rage	7/10
Blabbermouth.net	8.5/10 stars
Narc Magazine	5/5 stars

Shapeshifter is the eighth studio album by American metalcore band Memphis May Fire. It was released on March 28, 2025 through the band's longtime label Rise Records and was produced by their guitarist Kellen McGregor.

== Background and promotion ==
After the release of Remade In Misery, the band toured throughout 2023 and 2024, joining Asking Alexandria, The Word Alive and Archers on the All My Friends tour and co-headlining the We Want Your Misery tour, together with Atreyu, as well. During this time, Matty Mullins joined alternative band Anberlin as a live replacement for vocalist Stephen Christian throughout 2024.

On April 17, 2024, the band released a new single entitled "Chaotic" with a corresponding music video. A second single, Paralyzed, was released on June 26, 2024, followed by singles "Necessary Evil" on July 31, "Infection" on September 4 and "Hell Is Empty" on October 9. The sixth single, Shapeshifter, was released on November 20, 2024, coinciding with the announcement of the album, also titled Shapeshifter, with its release date and track list. On January 8, 2025, the band released the seventh single titled "Overdose" which featured guest vocals from Christian Lindskog of Blindside. On February 19, 2025, the eighth single titled "The Other Side" was released.

== Track listing ==
All tracks are written by Kellen McGregor, Matty Mullins, and Cody Quistad. Additional writing on "Chaotic" by Jon Lundin and on "Hell Is Empty" by Blair Daly and Zac Maloy.

Shapeshifter track listing
No.	Title	Length
1.	"Chaotic"	2:51
2.	"Infection"	2:47
3.	"Overdose" (featuring Blindside)	3:07
4.	"Paralyzed"	3:15
5.	"Hell Is Empty"	2:57
6.	"Necessary Evil"	2:56
7.	"The Other Side"	3:45
8.	"Shapeshifter"	3:05
9.	"Versus"	1:39
10.	"Love Is War"	3:40
Total length:		30:02

== Personnel ==
Credits adapted from the album's liner notes.

=== Memphis May Fire ===
- Matty Mullins – vocals
- Kellen McGregor – guitars, production, recording, mixing, mastering
- Cory Elder – bass
- Jake Garland – drums

=== Additional contributors ===
- Cameron Mizell – vocal production
- Christian Lindskog – additional vocals on "Overdose"
- Matt Collamore – 3D renderings
- Kevin Moore – album layout
- Chris Rusey – album layout

== Charts ==
Chart performance for Shapeshifter
Chart (2025)	Peak position
UK Album Downloads (OCC)	64
