= Nowhere To Be Found =

Portuguese alternative metal band

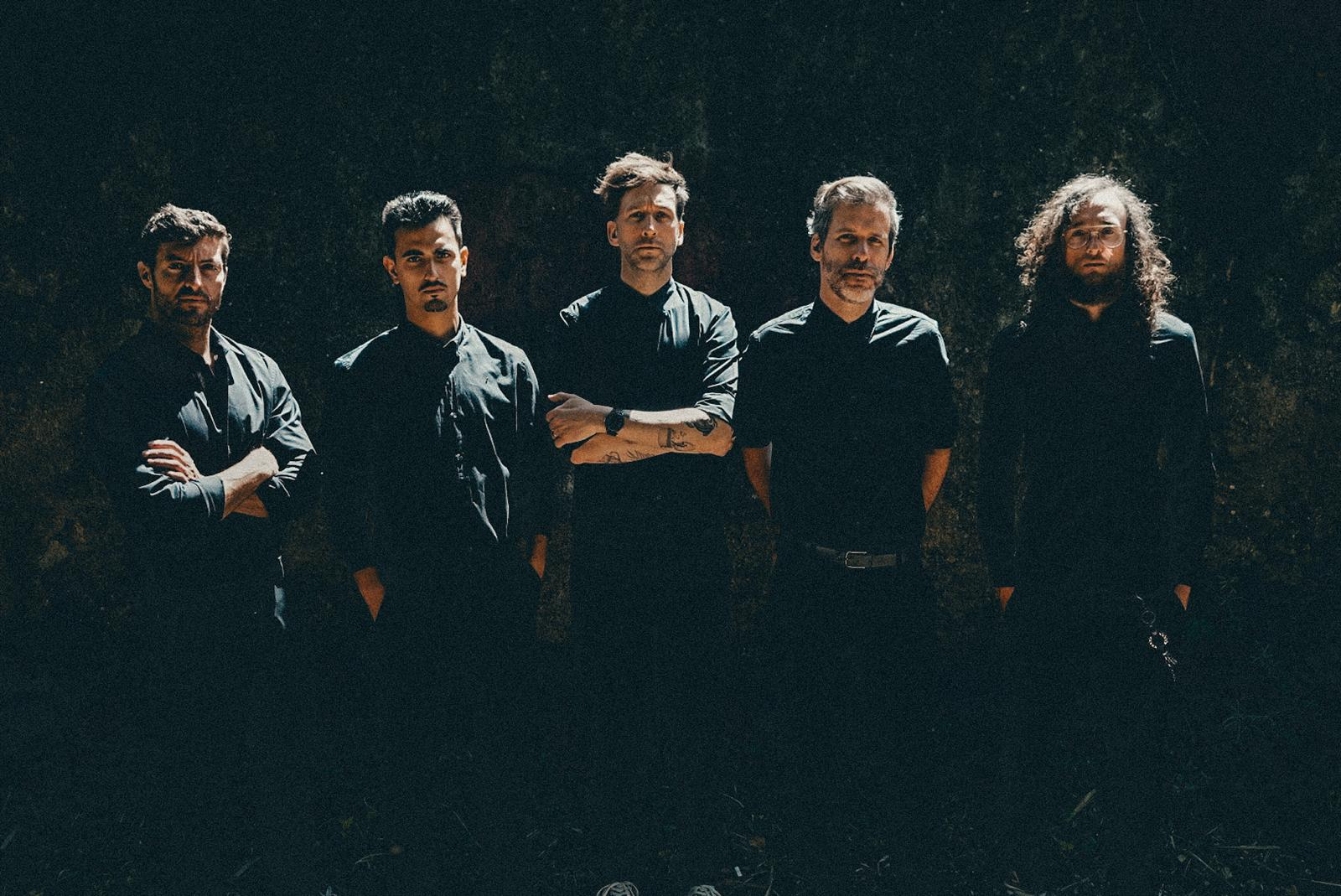
- Nowhere To Be Found, 2026. From left to right: Migalhas, Vasco, Tiago, Manel, Quintais

Background information
- Also known as: NTBF
- Origin: Ericeira
- Genres: Alternative metal Alternative rock Post-hardcore
- Years active: 2019 – present
- Label: Independent/Unsigned
- Members: Manel Gomes 'Migalhas' Rodrigues; João Quintais; Tiago Duarte; Vasco Braz
- Website: ntbfofficial.com

Nowhere To Be Found (often abbreviated as NTBF) is a Portuguese alternative metal band formed in Ericeira in 2019. Their sound combines elements of post-hardcore, melodic metalcore and modern hard rock with atmospheric production and emotionally driven songwriting.

The band consists of Tiago Duarte (vocals, rhythm guitar), João Quintais (lead guitar), Manel Gomes (bass), Miguel Rodrigues (drums) and Vasco Braz (guitar, programming and keyboards).

Although operating independently, NTBF became known for working with internationally recognised producers and engineers, including Swedish producer Henrik Udd, known for his work with Bring Me the Horizon and Architects, Grammy Award-winning mastering engineer Ted Jensen, whose credits include Metallica and Deftones, and mastering engineer Ste Kerry, recognised for his work with Sleep Token and While She Sleeps. Their music has accumulated more than 3 million streams across digital platforms and has been featured by outlets including MTV and CBS.

Their debut studio album is scheduled for release in 2026.

== History ==
=== Formation and early development (2018–2019) ===
Nowhere To Be Found was formed in Ericeira, Portugal, in 2019 by musicians coming from different local projects and creative backgrounds. From the beginning, the band approached songwriting and production with an emphasis on scale, detail and international collaboration.

The band’s earliest releases were developed through collaborations with internationally recognised producers and engineers. Their first material was produced with Swedish producer Henrik Udd, known for his work with Bring Me the Horizon, Architects and other contemporary metalcore acts. Mastering was later completed by Ted Jensen at Sterling Sound in New York, whose credits include Metallica, Muse, Deftones, Green Day and Slipknot. The band’s early material introduced a sound rooted in alternative metal and post-hardcore, while incorporating electronic textures, melodic hooks and polished modern production.

In 2019, NTBF appeared on the North American television programme Sound of the Underground, broadcast by CBS and focused on emerging heavy music artists.

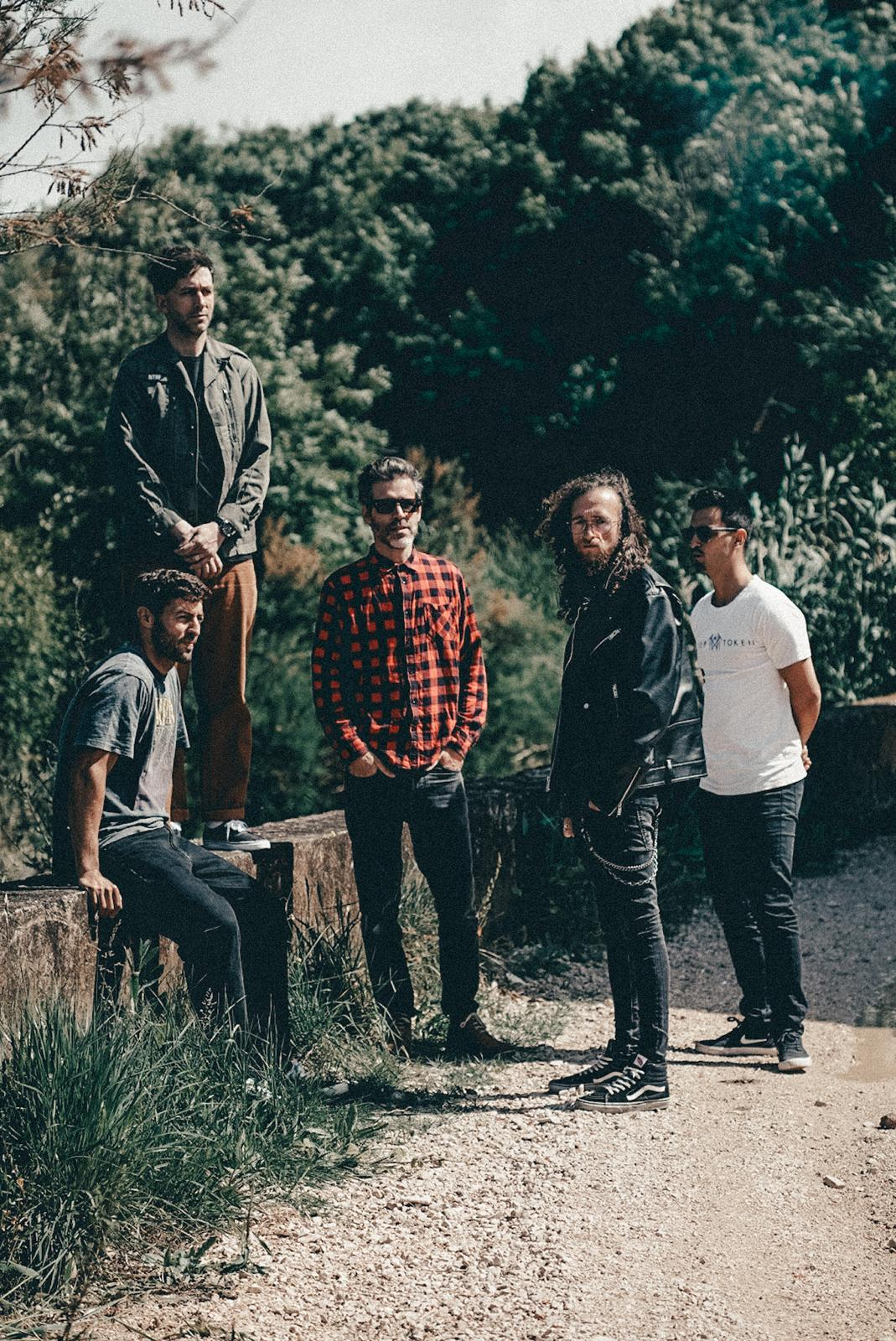
Nowhere To Be Found, 2026

=== Independent releases and growing visibility (2019–2024) ===
Between 2019 and 2024, the band released a sequence of standalone singles instead of pursuing a traditional album rollout. During this period, NTBF gradually developed an audience primarily through live performances, streaming platforms, social media and music video releases.

Their single “Traverse” featured Matty Mullins, vocalist of Memphis May Fire, while “Closer” included guest vocals from Emily Lazar of September Mourning and reinterpreted the 2016 song by The Chainsmokers through a heavier alternative metal approach.

Several releases received media attention outside Portugal. “The Prey”, featuring Tyron Layley of New Volume, premiered through MTV, followed by the band’s reinterpretation of The Weeknd’s “Blinding Lights” and the single “Hell Must Be Empty”.

During this period, NTBF performed extensively across Portugal, surpassing 50 live shows and appearing at festivals including Vilar de Mouros and Sol da Caparica. The band also supported international acts such as While She Sleeps and Smash Into Pieces.

In 2023, NTBF released “Medicate Me”, accompanied by a music video created in collaboration with the Portuguese National Ballet Company. The release continued the band’s interest in combining heavy music aesthetics with visual and performance-based artistic elements.

Throughout this period, the band continued operating independently, developing and producing their material from their studio space in Ericeira.

=== Debut album (2025–present) ===
In 2025, Nowhere To Be Found entered the final stages of production for their debut full-length album, scheduled for release in 2026.

The album is being mastered by Ste Kerry, known for his work with Sleep Token, While She Sleeps, Malevolence and Evanescence. It also features a guest appearance by Jessie Powell, vocalist of the Welsh post-hardcore band Dream State.

The first single associated with the project, “Who We Are”, was released ahead of the album and marked a darker and more expansive direction in the band’s sound.

== Musical style and influences ==
=== Sound and composition ===
Nowhere To Be Found’s music has been described as alternative metal, melodic metalcore and post-hardcore, while also incorporating elements of electronic rock, ambient textures and contemporary pop production.

The band’s sound is characterised by a contrast between aggressive instrumentation and melodic vocal structures, often balancing distorted guitars and modern metal production with emotionally driven choruses and atmospheric arrangements.

Their evolution across multiple standalone singles has shown a gradual shift from a more accessible alternative rock-oriented sound toward heavier and more expansive arrangements.

=== Influences ===
The band’s sound has been compared to contemporary alternative metal and post-hardcore acts such as Bring Me The Horizon, Bad Omens, Deftones, Dayseeker, and Architects.

NTBF have also cited influences from alternative rock, electronic music and cinematic sound design, contributing to the layered production style present throughout their releases.

== Reception ==
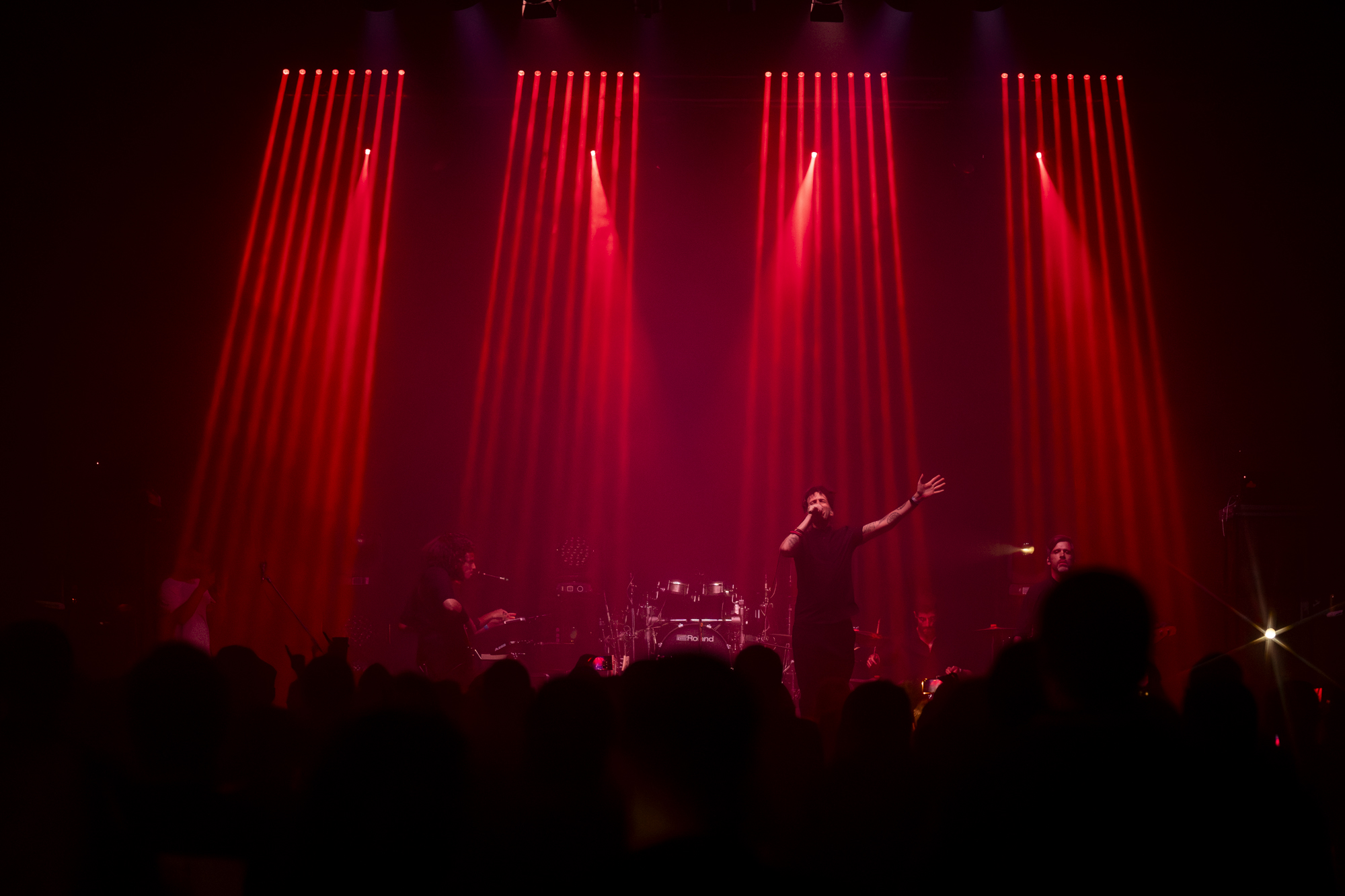
Nowhere To Be Found live, 2026 Lisbon

NTBF’s independent releases received attention from alternative music publications and digital media outlets, particularly for their production quality and collaborations with internationally recognised artists and engineers.

Several releases premiered through MTV, while the band’s early material was also featured on CBS’s Sound of the Underground.

== Artistry and creative process ==
=== Lyrics and themes ===
All lyrics are written by lead vocalist Tiago Duarte. The band’s lyrical themes frequently explore identity, emotional conflict, isolation, personal transformation and mental resilience, often through abstract or impressionistic writing rather than direct narrative storytelling.

=== Visual identity and independence ===
NTBF write and arrange their music collectively, with members contributing across composition, production and visual direction. The band also operates its own studio space in Ericeira, where they develop demos, rehearsals, live sessions and audiovisual content independently.

Their visual identity combines cinematic imagery, contemporary heavy music aesthetics and themes of emotional tension and isolation.

The band’s artwork and visual direction have involved collaborations with Survival Illustration & Design, a studio previously associated with artists including Mastodon, Parkway Drive and Bring Me the Horizon.

This balance between independence and high-level international production became one of the defining characteristics of the band’s identity.

== Band members ==
=== Members ===
- Tiago Duarte – lead vocals and rhythm guitar (2019–present)
- João Quintais – lead guitar (2019–present)
- Manel Gomes – bass and backing vocals (2019–present)
- 'Migalhas' Rodrigues – drums, percussion (2019–present)
- Vasco Braz - keyboards, programming, backing vocals, rhythm guitar (2025–present)

== Discography ==
=== Singles ===
- Closer [official music video]
- Traverse feat. Matty Mullins [official music video]
- The Prey [official music video]
- Blinding Lights [official music video]
- Hell Must Be Empty [official music video]
- Medicate Me [official music video]
- Who We Are [official music video]

=== Albums ===
- Live From Nowhere [official playlist]

== Industry collaborations ==
Members of Nowhere To Be Found are endorsed by instrument and audio manufacturers including PRS Guitars, Orange Amplifiers, EMG Pickups, Zildjian, Ernie Ball, Remo and sE Electronics.

The band records and develops much of its material independently from its studio in Ericeira.
