= Matty Mullins (album) =

Studio album by Matty Mullins
- Released: September 23, 2014
- Genre: Christian rock, pop, alternative rock, contemporary Christian music
- Length: 41:44
- Label: Rise
- Producer: Cameron Mizell

Singles from Matty Mullins
- 1. "My Dear" Released: August 12, 2014

Matty Mullins is the first full-length album by American rock musician Matty Mullins which was released September 23, 2014 by Rise Records. The album debuted at number 66 on the Billboard 200.

== Track listing ==
All lyrics written by Matty Mullins

| No. | Title | Length |
|---|---|---|
| 1. | "See You in Everything" | 3:27 |
| 2. | "My Dear" | 4:24 |
| 3. | "Right Here, Right Now" | 3:32 |
| 4. | "More of You" | 3:13 |
| 5. | "Speak to Me" | 4:15 |
| 6. | "Back to Square One" | 4:21 |
| 7. | "99% Soul" | 2:57 |
| 8. | "Come Alive" | 4:08 |
| 9. | "By My Side" | 3:38 |
| 10. | "Normal Like You" | 3:11 |
| 11. | "Glory" | 4:38 |
| Total length: | | 41:44 |

== Personnel ==
Credits adapted from AllMusic.

- Matty Mullins – lead vocals, producer, composer
- Cameron Mizell – additional vocals, producer, mixing, mastering, engineering, composer
- Matt "Scoop" Roberts – guitar, composer
- Shayne Garcia – photography
- Jeremy Tremp – cover photo
