= Old Me =

Old Me may refer to:

- "Old Me" (5 Seconds of Summer song), a 2020 single from the 2020 album Calm
- "Old Me, a song by Betty Who from her 2019 album Betty
- "The Old Me", a song by American rock band Memphis May Fire
