= Memphis May Fire (EP) =

EP by Memphis May Fire
- Released: December 4, 2007
- Recorded: 2007
- Studio: Rockwell Audio
- Genre: Metalcore; Southern rock
- Length: 19:02
- Label: Trustkill
- Producer: Geoff Rockwell, Memphis May Fire

Memphis May Fire chronology
Memphis May Fire (2007)	Sleepwalking (2009)

Professional ratings
Review scores
Source	Rating
AbsolutePunk.net	(70%) link
Allmusic	link

Memphis May Fire is the eponymous debut EP by American metalcore band Memphis May Fire. It was released on December 4, 2007 through Trustkill Records. This EP was the only official release by Memphis May Fire to feature Chase Ryan Robbins, the former vocalist who left the band in 2008 to focus on his newborn child. Guitarist Kellen McGregor described Ryan's contributions to Rock Sound, "Chase writes about dreams that make absolutely no sense. We're not a really serious band and that part is reflected in Chase's lyrics."

Josh Grabelle, president of Trustkill Records, commented on the band and this EP, "There is a lot of really exciting, young, dangerous music coming out of Texas right now, and Memphis May Fire are the cream of the crop. Not since Bullet for My Valentine's Hand of Blood EP have we heard a more compelling set of songs for an EP, where absolutely every song is bone-chillingly perfect, and timeless. These guys are on their way to something huge."

== Track listing ==
All lyrics written by Chase Ryan, all music composed by Kellen McGregor and Memphis May Fire

No.	Title	Length
1.	"Cowbell's Makin' a Comeback"	4:34
2.	"Neutron Cameras vs. Smuggled Nuclear Bombs"	3:43
3.	"Therapy Caravan of the Fair Room"	3:54
4.	"History of Mercia"	3:53
5.	"Conjunctions, Conjunctions, Everybody Loves Them"	2:58
Total length:		19:02

== Personnel ==
Memphis May Fire

- Chase Ryan Robbins – lead vocals
- Kellen McGregor – guitars, backing vocals
- Ryan Bentley – guitars
- Austin Radford – bass
- Jeremy Grisham – drums

Production

- Produced by Geoff Rockwell and Memphis May Fire
- Mastered and mixed by Geoff Rockwell
- A&R by Josh Grabelle
- Photography by Richard Redd (Redd Room Studios)
