= Unconditional (Memphis May Fire album) =

Studio album by Memphis May Fire
- Released: March 25, 2014
- Recorded: Chango Studios
- Genre: Metalcore; post-hardcore
- Length: 43:20; 55:08 (deluxe edition)
- Label: Rise
- Producer: Cameron Mizell; Kellen McGregor

Memphis May Fire chronology
Challenger (2012)	Unconditional (2014)	This Light I Hold (2016)

Singles from Unconditional
- 1. "No Ordinary Love" Released: February 6, 2014; 2. "Sleepless Nights" Released: February 24, 2014; 3. "Beneath the Skin" Released: March 11, 2014

Alternative cover
- Deluxe Edition cover

Professional ratings
Review scores
Source	Rating
AllMusic	3.5/5 stars
HM Magazine	4/5 stars
PopMatters	4/10

Unconditional is the fourth studio album by American metalcore band Memphis May Fire. It was released on the March 25, 2014 by Rise Records and distributed by Fontana Distribution. The deluxe edition was released on July 17, 2015.

== Background and recording ==
Memphis May Fire had planned to release their new album in early 2014. The band recorded at Chango Studios with Kellen and Cameron Mizell as the producers.

On December 14, 2013 the band tweeted that they had finished recording their forthcoming album with vocalist Matty Mullins expressing on how proud he was of the album. The album was expected to be an early 2014 release. On December 18, the band announced "The Unconditional Tour" beginning late February through March with fellow acts The Word Alive, A Skylit Drive, Hands Like Houses and Beartooth in the US.

In a studio update for the album, it was announced that it would be titled Unconditional and would be released on March 25, 2014 through Rise Records.

== Style and composition ==
In an Alternative Press interview released on September 7, 2013 the band stated that their new album will "have more of a theatrical feel, as well as orchestral presence" also describing their new album as a "soundtrack to an action film".

In another interview, the band described the sound of their new album, "[It] Just shows maturity. The newest record is very theatrical. It almost feels like a movie soundtrack from start to finish. It’s really awesome. A lot of orchestra stuff playing a big role in the record. It’s just – it’s more mature. I think that our younger audience is going to love it – certain aspects of it – and our older audience is going to really appreciate how far we’ve come as artists. They’re really going to love the record too. It’s great."

== Release and promotion ==
On February 6, 2014 the first single, "No Ordinary Love" was streamed through the Rise Records YouTube channel, and the official track listing was also released on this date. The band later released "Sleepless Nights" on February 24 and then "Beneath The Skin" on March 11, 2014. On March 13, 2014, Rise Records released a playlist of the full album on YouTube, announced by Mullins who tweeted, "Sometimes you gotta leak your own record!"

== Commercial performance ==
Unconditional debuted at No. 4 on the Billboard 200, No. 1 on the Top Rock Albums and the Billboard Alternative Albums chart, selling around 27,000 copies in the first week. The album has sold 83,000 copies in the United States as of September 2016.

== Track listing ==
All lyrics written by Matty Mullins, all music composed by Kellen McGregor and Memphis May Fire.

No.	Title	Length
1.	"No Ordinary Love"	3:56
2.	"Beneath the Skin"	4:12
3.	"Sleepless Nights"	3:41
4.	"The Answer"	4:09
5.	"Possibilities"	4:21
6.	"Speechless"	3:23
7.	"The Rose"	3:43
8.	"Not Enough"	4:03
9.	"Need to Be"	3:37
10.	"Pharisees"	3:53
11.	"Divinity"	4:22
Total length:		43:20

Deluxe Edition Bonus Tracks
No.	Title	Length
12.	"My Generation"	4:05
13.	"Stay the Course"	4:01

Acoustic Bonus Tracks
No.	Title	Length
14.	"Beneath the Skin"	4:54
15.	"Need to Be"	3:37
Total length:		59:57

== Personnel ==
Memphis May Fire

- Matty Mullins – lead vocals, keyboards
- Kellen McGregor – guitars, production, engineering, mixing, mastering
- Anthony Sepe – guitars
- Cory Elder – bass guitar
- Jake Garland – drums

Additional

- Cameron Mizell – production, engineering, mixing, mastering
- Brian Hood – mixing, mastering (deluxe edition)
- Kris Crummett – engineer
- Ryan Clark – layout design and band photography

== Charts ==
Chart (2014)	Peak position
UK Albums Chart (The Official Charts Company)	190
US Billboard 200	4
US Billboard Alternative Albums	1
US Top Hard Rock Albums (Billboard)	1
US Independent Albums (Billboard)	1
US Top Rock Albums (Billboard)	1

=== Year-end charts ===
Chart (2014)	Position
US Top Hard Rock Albums	28
