= The Old Me =

Single by Memphis May Fire

from the album Broken
- Released: September 18, 2018
- Recorded: 2018
- Length: 3:09
- Label: Rise
- Songwriter(s): Matty Mullins

Memphis May Fire singles chronology
"Wanting More" (2017)	"The Old Me" (2018)	"Live Another Day" (2019)

"The Old Me" is a song by American metalcore band Memphis May Fire. It serves as the first single off of their sixth studio album Broken. It peaked at number 19 on the Billboard Mainstream Rock Songs chart in March 2019.

== Background ==
The song is the first single from the band's sixth studio album, Broken. It was first released on September 21, 2018, almost two months before the album's release. A music video was later released for the song on November 6, 2018. The video, directed by Caleb Mallery, is meant to match the song's meaning and represent an internal struggle with oneself, according to frontman Matty Mullins.

== Composition and themes ==
The song features heavy guitar riffs and palm muting and deep drum beat that builds into a chorus with soaring clean vocals, along with a brief bridge with screamed vocals. Loudwire described it as an "energetic" track with a "catchy chorus" with a pleading chorus of “Tell me that I’m gonna be fine and there’s nothing left to fear/Cause I’ve been losing sleep/Trying to get back to who I used to be/Where is the old me?”. Mullins described the song of being about his personal struggles with anxiety and depression.

"'The Old Me'" is about my struggle with anxiety and depression. What feels like a war between good and evil, loathing the person I become mentally when it consumes me, and trying to remember what life was like before I lived with the symptoms. Ultimately hoping to one day become that person —’The Old Me’— again."

The song's music video was meant to mirror the message, with Mullins describing it as representing "the two versions of myself that are constantly at war with each other."

== Reception ==
HM magazine had mixed feelings on the song, citing it as representative of the album of a whole - lyrically genuine, but "rarely dig[ging] deeper than the surface".

== Personnel ==
Band

- Matty Mullins - vocals
- Kellen McGregor - guitars
- Cory Elder - bass
- Jake Garland - drums

== Charts ==
Chart (2019)	Peak position
US Mainstream Rock (Billboard)	19
