= Miss Fortune (band) =

US musical group

- Origin: Tulsa, Oklahoma, United States
- Genres: Post-hardcore; pop-punk; alternative rock
- Years active: 2012-present
- Labels: Sumerian Records (2013-2014); We Are Triumphant (2018-2019); Life or Death (2022-2023); Apathy Records (2024–present)
- Members: Mikey Sawyer
- Past members: Eddie Cano; Josh Kikta; Harley Graves; Ian Marchionda; Jace Thomas; Michael Skaggs; Nick Taylor; Christopher Almendarez; Hoi Wai Raphael Lam; Rufus Mann
- Website: www.missfortuneofficial.com

Miss Fortune is an American post-hardcore band formed in Tulsa, Oklahoma in 2012 by vocalist Micheal 'Mikey' Sawyer. The band has released five studio albums, two of which have charted on the Billboard charts. Since 2024 the band has released music through Sawyer's independent label Apathy Records.

== History ==
Miss Fortune was formed in February 2012 by vocalist Mikey Sawyer, with Eddie Cano, Josh Kikta, and Harley Graves participating in the original formation. Eddie Cano never recorded or released music with the band. Drummer Luke Holland was involved around the band's formation, but his only recorded performance with Miss Fortune is on the 2016 single "Die for You", produced by Cameron Mizell. On May 28, 2012, they self-released their debut single, produced by Joey Sturgis featuring Tyler Carter of the band Issues.

By December 2013, the band announced signing with Sumerian Records after removing Eddie Cano from their lineup as the unclean vocalist.

In early 2014, the band released their first single on the label called "Interstate 44", which would be from their upcoming full-length album, A Spark to Believe. Shortly after, a music video for the song "Chasing Dreams" was released March 5, 2014. On May 13, the band released their "No Light, No Light, a cover of Florence + The Machine as part of the Sumerian Records cover compilation "Florence + The Sphinx: Sumerian Ceremonials"

In May 2014, Miss Fortune announced they would be embarking on tour with I See Stars, Like Moths to Flames, Ghost Town, and Razihel.

In March 2014, the band announced they would be touring with Hands Like Houses, Slaves, and Alive Like Me.

On May 19, 2014, the band released their debut full-length A Spark To Believe produced by Kris Crummett.

Despite the success of the album, it was announced on October 30, 2014, that Miss Fortune had been dropped by Sumerian Records following lead singer Mikey Sawyer's arrest on domestic assault charges in Tulsa, Oklahoma. Sawyer published a statement on November 14 providing court records showing the singer was exonerated on all charges and would remain as the lead vocalist of the band moving forward. The band was not invited back onto the label.

In November 2016, the band released a stand-alone single called Die for You which would feature Luke Holland on drums, produced by Cameron Mizell.

In March 2018, Mikey Sawyer announced the band had signed to We Are Triumphant for their LP mixtape How the Story Ends, which came along with singles "The Hype You Stole", "3rd Degree", and "Hit the Road", before releasing the full studio album July 27, 2018.

In January 2019, the band released their cover of Post Malone's "Sunflower", as part of the We Are Triumphant cover album, Got You Covered, Vol. 3.

In July 2019, Miss Fortune announced they were recording their self-titled LP with producer Andrew Wade. The first single "Hearts on Fire" surfaced on December 5, 2019. Sawyer announced that he had an enlisted a new group to record the album including Hoi Wai Raphael Lam on guitar, Rufus Mann on bass, and Christopher Almendarez on drums. "Fentanyl" was released with an animated music video on January 24, 2020, announcing their new album Miss Fortune would be released April 3. The final single "Laugh at My Lessons" from the self-titled album was released March 13, 2020.

On June 26, 2020, they released a cover of The Offspring's song "The Kids Aren't Alright" as part of their acoustic full-length Cruel Summer, announcing the band had signed to We Are Triumphant for a one off acoustic EP.

On February 5, 2021, Miss Fortune published a song called "The Day the Sun Died" as a teaser to an upcoming album coming later in the 2021 year.

On May 26, 2023, the band released a new full-length album, Gravity's Rainbow, following several singles which were featured on the album.

The band released two singles in 2024, "I Ain't Afraid of No Ghostwriter", and "My Apologies Pt. 3". "My Apologies Pt. 3" was later removed from streaming services.

=== Apathy Records era (2024–present) ===
In 2024, vocalist Mikey Sawyer founded the independent label Apathy Records to self-release new material and reissue Miss Fortune's previous albums. On March 4, 2025, the band released the single "Unscathed", produced by Tom Denney (formerly of A Day to Remember). A second single, "Tunnel of Delulu", followed on April 18, 2025.

Later that summer, Miss Fortune announced that they had regained ownership of their entire master catalog, including A Spark to Believe, How the Story Ends, Cruel Summer, and Gravity’s Rainbow. Sawyer stated that all albums were being reissued under Apathy Records and that vinyl editions were in production.

The band's EP Unapologetic was released on September 12, 2025, containing the tracks "Unapologetic", "Kinda Misunderstood", "Tunnel of Delulu", and "Unscathed". It was the first Miss Fortune release to be fully self-owned and distributed via UnitedMasters.

On November 14, 2025, the remastered single "Interstate 44 (Remastered 2025)" was released ahead of a full remix and remaster of A Spark to Believe, produced by Kris Crummett and remixed by Seth Munson. The reissue was described by Sawyer as "the definitive version" of the band's 2014 debut.

== Members ==
Current

- Mikey Sawyer - vocals (2012–present)

Former

- Eddie Cano - unclean vocals (2012)
- Harley Graves - guitar (2012–2014)
- Jace Thomas - drums (2012–2014)
- Ian Marchionda - bass (2012–2014)
- Michael Skaggs - bass (2016–2017)
- Nick Taylor - drums (2016–2017)
- Josh Kikta - lead guitar (2012-2018)
- Christopher Almendarez - drums (2018-2020)
- Raphael Lam - guitar (2019-2020)
- Rufus Mann - bass (2019-2020)

== Discography ==
=== Albums ===
- A Spark to Believe (2014) [#13 Heatseekers, #20 Hard Rock albums, #155 Independent albums]
- How the Story Ends (2018)
- Miss Fortune (2020) [#11 Heatseekers, #20 Hard Rock albums, #30 Independent albums]
- Cruel Summer (2020) (acoustic album)
- Gravity's Rainbow (2023)
- Miss Fortune (Instrumentals & Acapellas) (2025)
- A Spark to Believe (Remastered) (2025)

=== EPs ===
- Unapologetic (2025), released September 12, 2025.

=== Singles ===
- "The Double Threat of Danger" (feat. Tyler Carter) (2012)
- "Interstate 44" (2014)
- "Chasing Dreams" (2014)
- "No Light, No Light" (2014)
- "Die for You" (featuring Luke Holland) (2016), produced by Cameron Mizell
- "The Bottom" (2017)
- "The Hype You Stole" (2018)
- "3rd Degree" (2018)
- "Hit the Road" (2018)
- "When the Lights Go Out" (2018), later removed from streaming services
- "Delusions of Grandeur" (2018)
- "Sunflower" (2019)
- "Hearts on Fire" (2019)
- "Fentanyl" (2020)
- "Laugh at My Lessons" (2020)
- "Your Reminder" (2020)
- "The Day the Sun Died" (2021)
- "All the White Lies in the World" (2021)
- "Backlash" (2022)
- "Rolling Blackout" (2022)
- "Matching Energies" (2023)
- "Black Pixie (On the Edge)" (2023)
- "Too Cool to Be Cordial" (2023)
- "Apathy Rules" (2023)
- "I Ain't Afraid of No Ghostwriter" (2024)
- "My Apologies Pt. 3" (2024)
- "Unscathed" (2025)
- "Tunnel of Delulu" (2025)
- "Kinda Misunderstood" (2025)
- "Interstate 44 (Remastered 2025)" (2025)
- "Wildfire" (May 29, 2026)
- "Epiphany" (July 24, 2026)
- "Break the Static" (September 18, 2026)

=== Other appearances ===
- Florence + The Sphinx: Sumerian Ceremonials (2014) - "No Light, No Light" (Originally performed by Florence + The Machine)
- Got You Covered, Vol 3 (2019) - "Sunflower" (Originally performed by Post Malone featuring Swae Lee)
- The Kids Aren't Alright (2020) - "The Kids Aren't Alright" (Originally performed by The Offspring)
