= Between the Lies =

EP by Memphis May Fire
- Released: November 2, 2010
- Recorded: September 2010
- Studio: Chango Studios, Orlando, Florida
- Genre: Metalcore; post-hardcore
- Length: 18:27
- Label: Bullet Tooth
- Producer: Kellen McGregor

Memphis May Fire chronology
Sleepwalking (2009)	Between the Lies (2010)	The Hollow (2011)

Professional ratings
Review scores
Source	Rating
Rock Sound	(80%) link

Between the Lies is the second EP by American metalcore band Memphis May Fire. It was released on November 2, 2010, through Bullet Tooth Records.

== Track listing ==
All lyrics written by Matty Mullins, all music composed by Kellen McGregor and Memphis May Fire

No.	Title	Length
1.	"Be Careful What You Wish For"	3:41
2.	"Action/Adventure"	4:13
3.	"Vaulted Ceilings"	3:20
4.	"Deuces Las Cruces"	3:04
5.	"Gingervitus"	4:09
Total length:		18:27

== Personnel ==
Memphis May Fire

- Matty Mullins – lead vocals, keyboards
- Kellen McGregor – guitars, backing vocals
- Ryan Bentley – guitars
- Cory Elder – bass
- Eric Molesworth – drums

Production

- Produced, mastered and mixed by Kellen McGregor
- Engineered by Kellen McGregor and Ryan Bentley
- Management by Jerry Clubb and Jim Present (Ricochet Management)
- Photography by Evan Dell
