= Decoder (band) =

American post-hardcore band

- Origin: St. Petersburg, Florida, U.S.
- Genres: Post-hardcore, post-rock
- Years active: 2010-2012
- Label: Rise
- Past members: Keith Jones; Jack Burns; Brent Guistwite; Vinny Capitani; Liam Thomas; Spencer Pearson; Anthony Sepe; Bryce Sipes

Decoder was an American post-hardcore band formed in 2010 in Florida. The group consisted of former members of the bands Versa, Polyenso, and Of Machines. Decoder were signed to Rise Records and released one album. The group performed mellow and slow tempoed post-rock and ambient-influenced instrumentals coupled with screamed vocals and heavy percussion.

On March 1, 2012, the band changed their name from Decoder to Lead Hands, settling a lawsuit of the group's original name due to a band from New Jersey of the same name. However, shortly after the name change to Lead Hands, the band disbanded.

== History ==
=== Inception and signing to Rise Records (2010) ===
Decoder was an idea that came about when drummer Brent Guistwite, formerly of Of Machines, and Jack Burns, formerly of Oceana parted ways with their respective bands. They had the style and concept for the music decided before they approached Keith Jones, formerly of Oceana, and Spencer Pearson, formerly of VersaEmerge, to be the band's vocalists, and both accepted. Bassist Bryce Sipes joined shortly after the recording of the band's demo for the song "Dreamwalker". On August 24, 2010, the band announced their signing to Rise Records on through their Facebook page, and entered the studio with rock producer Matt Malpass on August 28, 2010. When asked in an interview with Jake Denning about signing to Rise, Guistwite answered saying that "Jack [Burns] and I had been jamming together for awhile and we sent Craig [Ericson, Rise Records founder] some stuff we had been working on and he essentially sent [Decoder] a contract". The band's second guitarist, Anthony Sepe, joined on December 30, 2010.

=== Self-titled album (2011–2012) ===
Decoder's debut self-titled album, which was produced by Matt Malpass, was released through Rise Records on January 17, 2011, to positive reviews. The album debuted at number 44 on Billboard Top Heatseekers. The band's first tour was in support of Emarosa, Chiodos, and Go Radio, beginning on February 15, 2011. On February 7, 2011, Decoder posted a teaser for their upcoming music video for the song "Believers", and finished another tour dubbed "The Rise Record Tour" with Memphis May Fire, Ten After Two and That's Outrageous!. The music video for "Believers" was released on May 13, 2011.

=== Name change and break up (2012–2013) ===
By early 2012, Anthony Sepe left to join Memphis May Fire and Spencer Pearson left on January 15 due to many issues regarding him with the band. Fans quickly became aware their departures evident from public announcements at live performances along with Twitter posts. Short weeks later, bass player, Bryce Sipes also left the band on February 5 due to his distaste with the music industry. On March 1, 2012, the band revealed that Liam Thomas was added to the group on bass guitar and clean vocals, replacing the positions of both Pearson and Sipes. They had also inducted a second guitarist by the name of Vinny Capitani and changed the band's name to Lead Hands due to a lawsuit settling over a band of the same name from New Jersey.

The name is about fighting through negative/bad things. We didn't want members to leave, or to lose a lawsuit but it happened, we could have packed up shop like most bands do but we decided to fight through this. We know not everyone is going to like the change but its life and it happens. Fight through negativity with Lead Hands

Keith Jones left the band to pursue a solo acoustic career in June and then on the first of July, Lead Hands officially disbanded. The group did not release any material or ever perform live under the Lead Hands name. Guitarist Jack Burns was sued and faced criminal charges of $3,400 along with a possible prison sentence of three years due to financial debt ensued from a company that issued merchandise for Decoder.

== Band members ==
Final line-up

- Jack Burns — guitars (2010–2012)
- Brent Guistwite — drums (2010–2012)
- Keith Jones — unclean vocals (2010–2012)
- Vinny Capitani — guitars (2012)
- Liam Thomas — bass guitar, clean vocals (2012)

Former members

- Anthony Sepe — guitars (2010–2012)
- Spencer Pearson — clean vocals (2010–2012)
- Bryce Sipes — bass guitar (2010–2012)

== Discography ==
- Decoder (as Decoder) (Rise Records, 2011)
