= Matty Mullins =

American singer (born 1988)

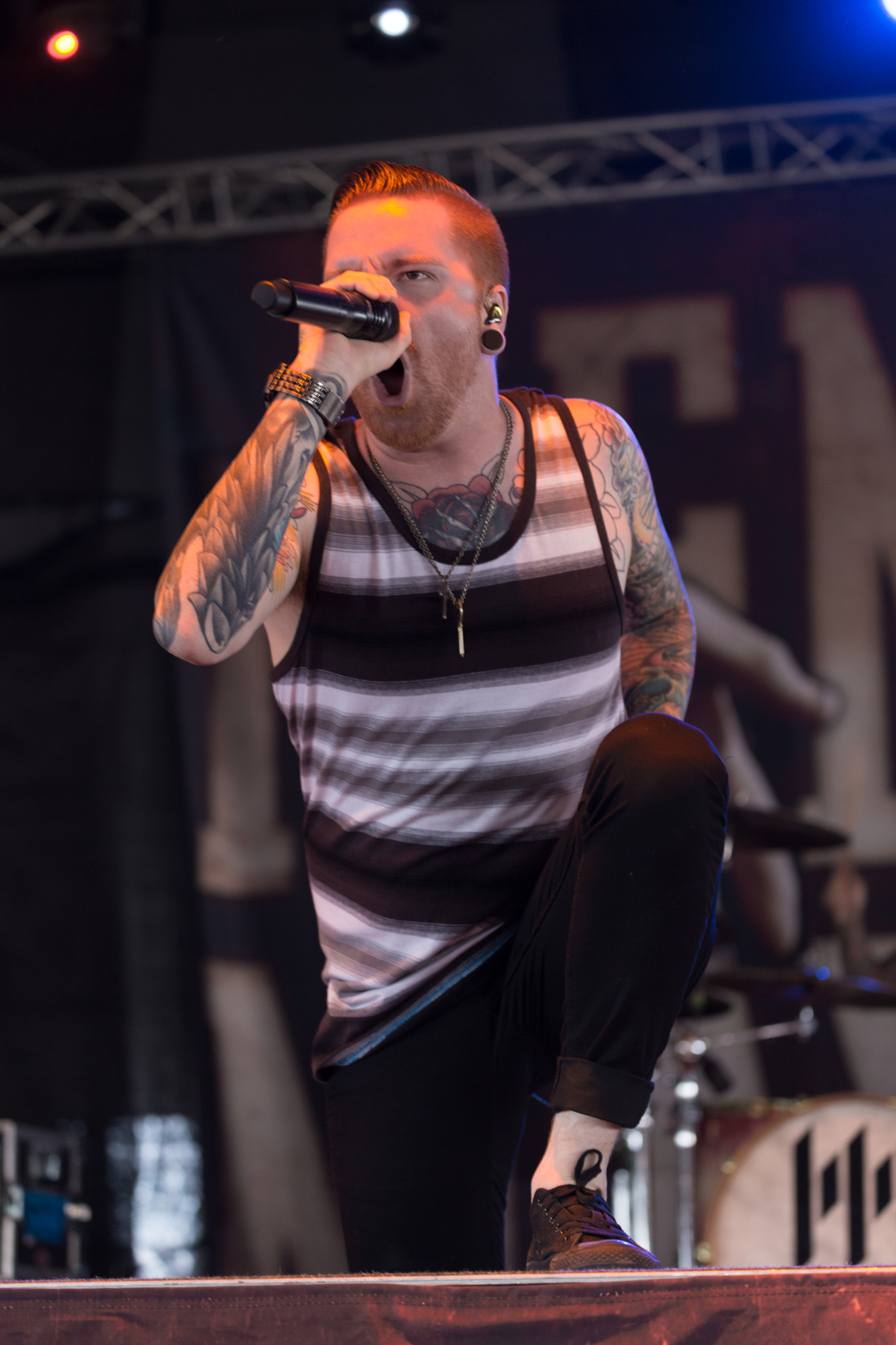
- Mullins at With Full Force 2014

Background information
- Born: July 3, 1988 (age 38); Spokane, Washington, U.S.
- Genres: Post-hardcore; metalcore; pop rock
- Occupations: Singer, songwriter
- Years active: 2008–present
- Member of: Memphis May Fire; Anberlin

Matty Mullins (born July 3, 1988) is an American singer who is the lead vocalist of the metalcore band Memphis May Fire and alternative band Anberlin.

== Life and career ==
Matty Mullins was born and raised in Spokane, Washington. His father was a pastor. He grew up in a Conservative Christian family and was only allowed to attend the concerts of Christian rock bands. Mullins graduated from Shadle Park High School. When he was 18, he married Brittany Mullins. He is living in Nashville, TN.

Before joining Memphis May Fire through an open audition in 2008 Mullins played in several local music groups in Spokane. He worked on the Between the Lies EP and the albums Sleepwalking, The Hollow, Challenger, Unconditional, This Light I Hold, Broken, Remade in Misery and Shapeshifter.

He is featured as guest vocalist for several acts like Woe, Is Me, Hands Like Houses, Sleeping with Sirens, For Today, Spoken, Nowhere To Be Found and Yellowcard. In 2013 it was announced that Mullins started a solo project. His solo album was scheduled for release on September 23, 2014, via Rise Records. It debuted at 66 on the Billboard 200 charts in the US the week of October 11, 2014.

On October 10, 2023, lead singer Stephen Christian of Anberlin announced he would be stepping down from touring. Mullins was chosen as Anberlin's new live lead vocalist, and on June 14, 2024, the band announced their album Vega, which featured two songs with Mullins on lead vocals, "Walk Alone" and "Seven". "Walk Alone" was released on June 21, 2024 with an accompanying music video, with Mullins fully taking over the mantle of the band's lead vocalist. Anberlin will release their first album with Mullins, CURRENCY, In November 2026.

== Musical influences ==
He stated being influenced by bands like Every Time I Die, Architects, Bring Me the Horizon and Asking Alexandria. As well as Anberlin, who he later became a singer for.

Mullins is the main songwriter for Memphis May Fire. His lyrics often deal with personal experiences, both as a person and a musician, and his Christian faith.

Mullins wrote "Prove Me Right" about the band's former label, Trustkill Records, and is a critique on the younger music industry.

== Personal life ==
In 2016, Mullins launched a men's grooming brand: On Point Pomade. He is active with his wife Brittany's peer-to-peer mentoring nonprofit, Beneath the Skin.

== Discography ==
=== Memphis May Fire ===
EPs

- 2010: Between the Lies (Bullet Tooth Records)

Studio albums

- Sleepwalking (2009)
- The Hollow (2011)
- Challenger (2012)
- Unconditional (2014)
- This Light I Hold (2016)
- Broken (2018)
- Remade in Misery (2022)
- Shapeshifter (2025)

=== Solo ===
Studio albums

- 2014: Matty Mullins (Rise Records)
- 2017: Unstoppable (BEC Recordings)

=== Nights in Fire ===
Studio albums

- Dark and Desperate Times (2007)

=== Anberlin ===
Studio albums

- Vega (2024)
- Nevertake (2025)
- Currency (2026)

=== Collaborations ===
Year	Song	Album	Artist
2011	"The Architect" (featuring Matty Mullins)	Descendants	Fit for a King
2012	"Thomas" (featuring Matty Mullins)	I Am Nothing	Convictions
2012	"Watchmaker" (featuring Matty Mullins)	Ground Dweller	Hands Like Houses
2012	"The Walking Dead" (featuring Matty Mullins)	Genesi[s]	Woe, Is Me
2013	"Congratulations" (featuring Matty Mullins)	Feel	Sleeping With Sirens
2013	"Rokit Man" (featuring Matty Mullins)	Morla and the Red Balloon	Time Traveller
2014	"Break the Cycle" (featuring Matty Mullins)	Fight the Silence	For Today
2014	"The World in Your Way" (featuring Matty Mullins)	The World in Your Way	Mireau
2014	"The Deepest Well" (featuring Matty Mullins)	Lift a Sail	Yellowcard
2015	"Portraits" (featuring Matty Mullins)	Permanence	Storm the Sky
2015	"Pretty Lies" (featuring Matty Mullins)	Pretty Lies	VERIDIA
2015	"Drag Me Down (One Direction Cover)" (featuring Matty Mullins)	Single	Our Last Night
2015	"Breathe Again" (featuring Matty Mullins)	Breathe Again	Spoken
2016	"Overcome/Overthrow" (featuring Matty Mullins)	Single	A Story Inspired
2016	"Winds" (featuring Matty Mullins)	Tramps	TRAMPS
2017	"Someday" (featuring Matty Mullins)	Real Life	Aaron Sprinkle
2018	"Slip" (featuring Matty Mullins)	Afraid to Dream	Between Forever
2018	"Who Am I" (featuring Matty Mullins)	Still Just Breathing	Set for the Fall
2019	"Traverse" (featuring Matty Mullins)	Single	Nowhere to be Found
2019	"Come to Life" (featuring Matty Mullins)	Single	Neon Feather
2019	"Monster" (featuring Matty Mullins & TYNAN)	Unleashed	Kayzo
2020	"Say Something (Justin Timberlake Cover)" (featuring Matty Mullins)	Single	Danny Worsnop
2022	"Until We Break" (featuring Matty Mullins)	Blackout	From Ashes to New
2023	"HUMAN" (featuring Matty Mullins)	Single	elijah
2025	"Permanent" (featuring Matty Mullins)	Phantoms/Twenty	Acceptance
2026	"She Said She Didn't Want Fries" (featuring Matty Mullins)	Songs to Listen to in a Wendy's Parking Lot	Wendy's
