= The Hollow (album) =

Studio album by Memphis May Fire
- Released: April 26, 2011
- Genre: Metalcore; post-hardcore
- Length: 41:30
- Label: Rise
- Producer: Cameron Mizell

Memphis May Fire chronology
Between the Lies (2010)	The Hollow (2011)	Challenger (2012)

Singles from The Hollow
- 1. "The Sinner" Released: March 3, 2011; 2. "The Unfaithful" Released: February 15, 2012

Professional ratings
Aggregate scores
Source	Rating
Metacritic	(66/100)
Review scores
Source	Rating
Allmusic	3/5 stars
Rock Sound	8/10 stars

The Hollow is the second studio album by American metalcore band Memphis May Fire. It was released on April 26, 2011, through Rise Records. The album is the band's first release on the label.

It is the first album to feature Jake Garland on drums, replacing former drummer Eric Molesworth and the last to have rhythm guitarist Ryan Bentley before his departure in April 2011, to be replaced by Anthony Sepe.

== Track listing ==
All lyrics written by Matty Mullins, all music composed by Kellen McGregor and Memphis May Fire

No.	Title	Length
1.	"The Sinner"	4:01
2.	"The Unfaithful"	3:58
3.	"The Victim"	4:00
4.	"The Abandoned"	3:40
5.	"The Deceived"	4:04
6.	"The Commanded"	3:30
7.	"The Burden (Interlude)"	3:16
8.	"The Haunted"	3:41
9.	"The Reality"	4:48
10.	"The Redeemed"	6:32
Total length:		41:30

== Personnel ==
Memphis May Fire

- Matty Mullins – lead vocals, keyboards
- Kellen McGregor – guitars
- Ryan Bentley – guitars
- Cory Elder – bass
- Jake Garland – drums

Production

- Produced, mixed and mastered by Cameron Mizell
- Engineered by Ryan Bentley and Kellen McGregor
- Composed by Kellen McGregor and Matty Mullins
- Artwork by Glenn Thomas (We Are Synapse)
- Photo by Sam Link
