= Challenger (Memphis May Fire album) =

Studio album by Memphis May Fire
- Released: June 26, 2012
- Studios: Chango Studios, Orlando, Florida
- Genres: Metalcore; post-hardcore
- Length: 41:52
- Label: Rise
- Producers: Cameron Mizell; Kellen McGregor

Memphis May Fire chronology
The Hollow (2011)	Challenger (2012)	Unconditional (2014)

Singles from Challenger
- 1. "Prove Me Right" Released: May 24, 2012; 2. "Vices" Released: June 13, 2012; 3. "Miles Away" Released: August 1, 2013

Professional ratings
Aggregate scores
Source	Rating
Metacritic	(65/100)
Review scores
Source	Rating
Absolute Punk	75%
Alternative Press	3/5 stars
Kerrang!	3/5 stars
Punknews.org	2/5 stars
Rock Sound	7/10 stars
Sputnik Music	4.5/5 stars
Rockfreaks.net	8.5/10 stars

Challenger is the third studio album by American metalcore band Memphis May Fire. The album was released June 26, 2012 via Rise Records. The band released the first single, "Prove Me Right," on May 24. They also released the 5th track on the album, "Vices," on June 13 as the second single from the album. On June 18, all of the songs were uploaded to YouTube on the Rise Records page. The album debuted at number 16 on the Billboard 200, selling more than 18,000 copies in its first week.

It is the first album to have rhythm guitarist Anthony Sepe who replaced original member Ryan Bentley following his departure in April 2011.

== Track listing ==
All lyrics written by Matty Mullins, all music composed by Kellen McGregor and Memphis May Fire.

No.	Title	Length
1.	"Without Walls"	1:42
2.	"Alive in the Lights"	4:11
3.	"Prove Me Right"	4:08
4.	"Red in Tooth & Claw"	4:14
5.	"Vices"	4:08
6.	"Legacy"	4:04
7.	"Miles Away" (featuring Kellin Quinn of Sleeping with Sirens)	4:12
8.	"Jezebel"	4:21
9.	"Losing Sight" (featuring Danny Worsnop of Asking Alexandria)	3:40
10.	"Generation: Hate"	4:27
11.	"Vessels"	2:46
Total length:		41:52

== Personnel ==
- Matty Mullins – lead vocals, keyboards
- Kellen McGregor – guitars
- Anthony Sepe – guitars
- Cory Elder – bass guitar
- Jake Garland – drums
