= Sleepwalking (Memphis May Fire album) =

Studio album by Memphis may Fire
- Released: July 21, 2009
- Genres: Post-hardcore; metalcore; Southern rock
- Length: 35:11
- Label: Trustkill
- Producer: Casey Bates

Memphis may Fire chronology
| Memphis May Fire (2007) | Sleepwalking (2009) | Between the Lies (2010) |

Singles from Sleepwalking
- 1. "North Atlantic vs. North Carolina" Released: October 22, 2009; 2. "Ghost in the Mirror" Released: February 2, 2010

Professional ratings
Review scores
| Source | Rating |
|---|---|
| Alternative Press | link |
| Rock on Request | Favorable link |
| Rockfreaks.net | 7.5/10 stars |

Sleepwalking is the debut studio album by American metalcore band Memphis may Fire. The album was released through Trustkill Records on July 21, 2009. This album is the first album to feature lead vocalist Matty Mullins after former lead vocalist Chase Ryan left the band in 2008. Scheduled to be released summer 2008, the release got delayed because of the line-up change. Mullins has described the album as "a new breed of rock 'n' roll" and musically it has "more aggressive guitar-work and noticeably more melodic, but still retains that Southern swagger".

The song "Ghost in the Mirror" was featured on the Saw VI soundtrack with an accompanying music-video for the DVD-release of the movie.

== Track listing ==
All lyrics written by Matty Mullins, all music composed by Kellen McGregor and Memphis May Fire.

| No. | Title | Length |
|---|---|---|
| 1. | "North Atlantic Vs North Carolina" | 3:43 |
| 2. | "A Giant In a Giant's World" | 3:13 |
| 3. | "You're Lucky It's Not 1692" | 3:40 |
| 4. | "Ghost In The Mirror" | 3:54 |
| 5. | "Been There, Done That" | 3:31 |
| 6. | "Quantity Is Their Quality" | 3:28 |
| 7. | "Sleepwalking" | 3:47 |
| 8. | "Destiny For The Willing" | 3:05 |
| 9. | "The Face With No Name" | 3:10 |
| 10. | "Speak Now I'm Listening" | 3:40 |
| Total length: | | 35:11 |

Bonus Tracks
| No. | Title | Length |
|---|---|---|
| 11. | "When It Rains It Pours" | 4:01 |
| Total length: | | 39:15 |

== Personnel ==
Memphis May Fire

- Matty Mullins - lead vocals
- Kellen McGregor - lead guitar, backing vocals
- Ryan Bentley - rhythm guitar
- Cory Elder - bass
- Jeremy Grisham - drums

Production

- Produced, mastered, and mixed by Casey Bates
