= Memphis May Fire =

American metalcore band

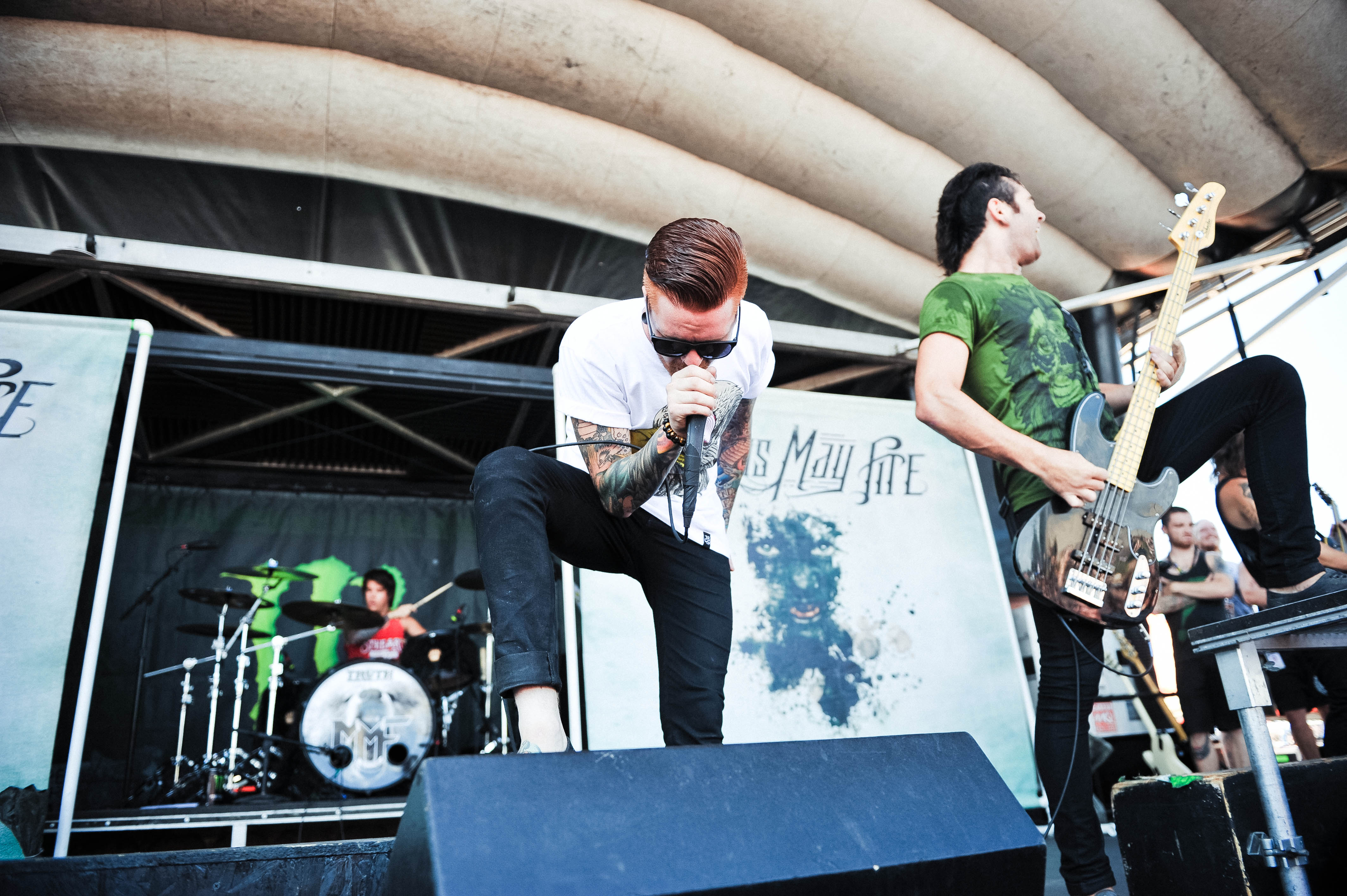
- Memphis May Fire at Warped Tour 2012

Background information
- Origin: Denton, Texas, U.S.
- Genres: Metalcore; post-hardcore; alternative metal; nu metal; southern rock (early)
- Years active: 2006–present
- Labels: Rise; Trustkill
- Members: Kellen McGregor; Matty Mullins; Cory Elder; Jake Garland
- Past members: Tanner Oakes; Ryan Dooley; Chase Ryan Robbin; Jeremy Grisham; Austin Radford; Daniel De Los Santos; Joel Seier; Eric Molesworth; Ryan Bentley; Anthony Sepe
- Website: Memphis May Fire on Facebook www.memphismayfire.com

Memphis May Fire is an American metalcore band formed in Denton, Texas, and currently signed to Rise Records. The band currently consists of lead guitarist Kellen McGregor, lead vocalist Matty Mullins, bassist Cory Elder, and drummer Jake Garland. Formed in 2006, they have released eight studio albums and two EPs to date. Their fourth album, Unconditional, debuted at No. 4 on the US Billboard 200 and atop the Alternative Albums chart.

== History ==
=== Formation (2006–2007) ===
The band, founded by original vocalist Chase Ryan, guitarist Ryan Bentley and bassist Tanner Oakes, formed in 2006 in Denton, Texas, but it was not until February 2007 that the group solidified the name Memphis May Fire, having previously gone by Oh Captain, My Captain. In early 2007, the band recorded and self-released an EP and began creating a local following. Shortly thereafter, Memphis May Fire caught the attention of Josh Grabelle, the president of Trustkill Records.

Grabelle commented on his feelings toward the band in a press release stating, "There is a lot of really exciting, young, dangerous music coming out right now, and Memphis May Fire are the cream of the crop. Not since Bullet for My Valentine's Hand of Blood have we heard a more compelling set of songs for an EP, where absolutely every song is bone-chillingly perfect, and timeless. These guys are on their way to something huge." In September 2007 the band had officially signed to Trustkill, and their self-titled EP was reissued through the label in December 2007. In 2007, through 2008, the band embarked on Twelve Gauge Valentine's final-tour along with The Handshake Murders.

=== Line-up changes and Sleepwalking (2008–2009) ===
Memphis May Fire had hoped to release their debut album by summer 2008 produced by their guitarist, Kellen McGregor. However, after the recording sessions for the album during tour, lead singer Chase and short time drummer Dooley decided to part ways with the band. Chase explained that he felt that his priorities should be with his child, and not a touring band. Dooley would end his touring back home in St. Louis.

Upon announcing their resignations, bass player Tanner Oakes left the tour and the band. Bassist Austin Radford joined the band to finish the tour but would decide to part ways with the band shortly after creating his own band called, American Mantra as the lead singer. He would be replaced by Daniel De Los Santos as a substitute, and then later by Cory Elder, who is a current member. Open auditions were held shortly after Chase's departure with an instrumental song called "Decade" on their MySpace (later known as "Destiny for the Willing"), and he was eventually replaced by a new vocalist, Matty Mullins (Nights in Fire). By this time, Memphis May Fire had already recorded their instruments for the new album with producer Casey Bates and only needed Mullins to contribute his vocals.

Their debut full-length studio album, Sleepwalking, was released on July 21, 2009, through Trustkill Records. Memphis May Fire has described the album as "a new breed of rock n' roll" and musically it has "more aggressive guitar work and noticeably more melodic, but still retains that southern swagger." Their song "Ghost in the Mirror" was used on the soundtrack for the movie Saw VI. Rhythm guitarist, Ryan Bentley, was not featured in the music video due to his short break away from the band. Joel Seier joined the band as a substitute for Bentley's place until he would join back in late 2009. Seier was featured in "Ghost in the Mirror" and "North Atlantic vs. North Carolina" music videos as the rhythm guitarist.

The official music video for "Ghost in the Mirror" was released February 2, 2010, through the Trustkill YouTube page.

=== Signing to Rise Records and The Hollow (2010–2011) ===
Memphis May Fire released a second EP entitled Between the Lies on November 2, 2010, through Bullet Tooth Records (formerly Trustkill Records) with more energy and a different style than their previous releases. On December 9, 2010, the band post in their Facebook that the song "Action/Adventure" will be featured in the video game Rock Band 3. In 2010, Matty Mullins was featured in the song "That's What She Said", from Kid Liberty's debut album Fight with Your Fists.

On January 17, 2011, Rise Records announced that Memphis May Fire signed to the label and that a new album would be released in spring. The band wrapped up the recording of their next full-length record at Chango Studios (Of Machines, I See Stars, Sleeping with Sirens, etc.) in Orlando, Florida. It was expected to be heavier and darker than Sleepwalking and Between the Lies, while further incorporating elements of modern metal and electronics.

On March 3, 2011, a full album teaser for their sophomore album The Hollow was released via Rise Records YouTube page, including its release date of April 26, 2011. On March 22, a full song from The Hollow, titled "The Sinner", was released to Rise Records YouTube page and on iTunes. On April 23, the entire album was released on the Rise Records YouTube page.

On September 15, the video for the lead single from The Hollow, "The Sinner", directed by Thunder Down Country was released on YouTube.

On February 15, 2012, a live music video recorded in Orlando, Florida for the song titled "The Unfaithful" was released on their YouTube Page.

It was announced through the Vans Warped Tour's website on December 7 that Memphis May Fire would be participating in the 2012 Vans Warped Tour. The band was called to perform on the Monster Energy stage for the majority of the tour, and both Kia Rio and Kia Soul main stages on selected dates.

=== Departure of Ryan Bentley and Challenger (2012–2013) ===
On February 11, it was announced by Kellen McGregor that the band would be working with Cameron Mizell shortly again at Chango Studios, to record their third studio album.

On April 11, rhythm guitarist and original member, Ryan Bentley, announced on Twitter he has parted ways with the band in a tweet saying "I'm no longer in Memphis May Fire. Details later.", around midnight. On the band's direct-to-fan fanbridge, Kellen McGregor responded saying that they had to let go of Ryan because he did not have the right attitude and was not willing to push the band to a positive direction. On April 17, the band announced that Anthony Sepe (ex-Decoder) would be replacing Ryan Bentley as their new guitarist: "For those who may not know already, we recently decided to part ways with our guitarist, Ryan Bentley, and wish him nothing but the best. He's a talented individual and we have no doubt that he will be successful no matter where life leads him. With that said, we'd like all of you to give a warm welcome to our new guitarist Anthony Sepe."

Bentley's departure from the band makes guitarist Kellen McGregor the only remaining original member of Memphis May Fire.

Their third studio album, Challenger was released on June 26 through Rise Records. The album debuted at number 16 on the Billboard Charts while the band was on tour as part of the Warped Tour.

The band continued to tour following the album throughout the USA, Europe, and the UK.

On February 1, 2013, Memphis May Fire was announced as part of the Vans Warped Tour 2013 alongside Black Veil Brides, Sleeping With Sirens, We Came As Romans, Blessthefall, The Used, Billy Talent and Bring Me the Horizon. The band was called to play main stage (Kia Soul Stage), they played the entire tour with an eight-song set, featuring Kellin Quinn singing the bridge of "Legacy".

On August 4, the band announced that they will be supporting Sleeping With Sirens, on the Feel This Tour. Breathe Carolina, Issues, and Our Last Night will be supporting the tour with them on selected dates.

=== Unconditional (2013–2015) ===
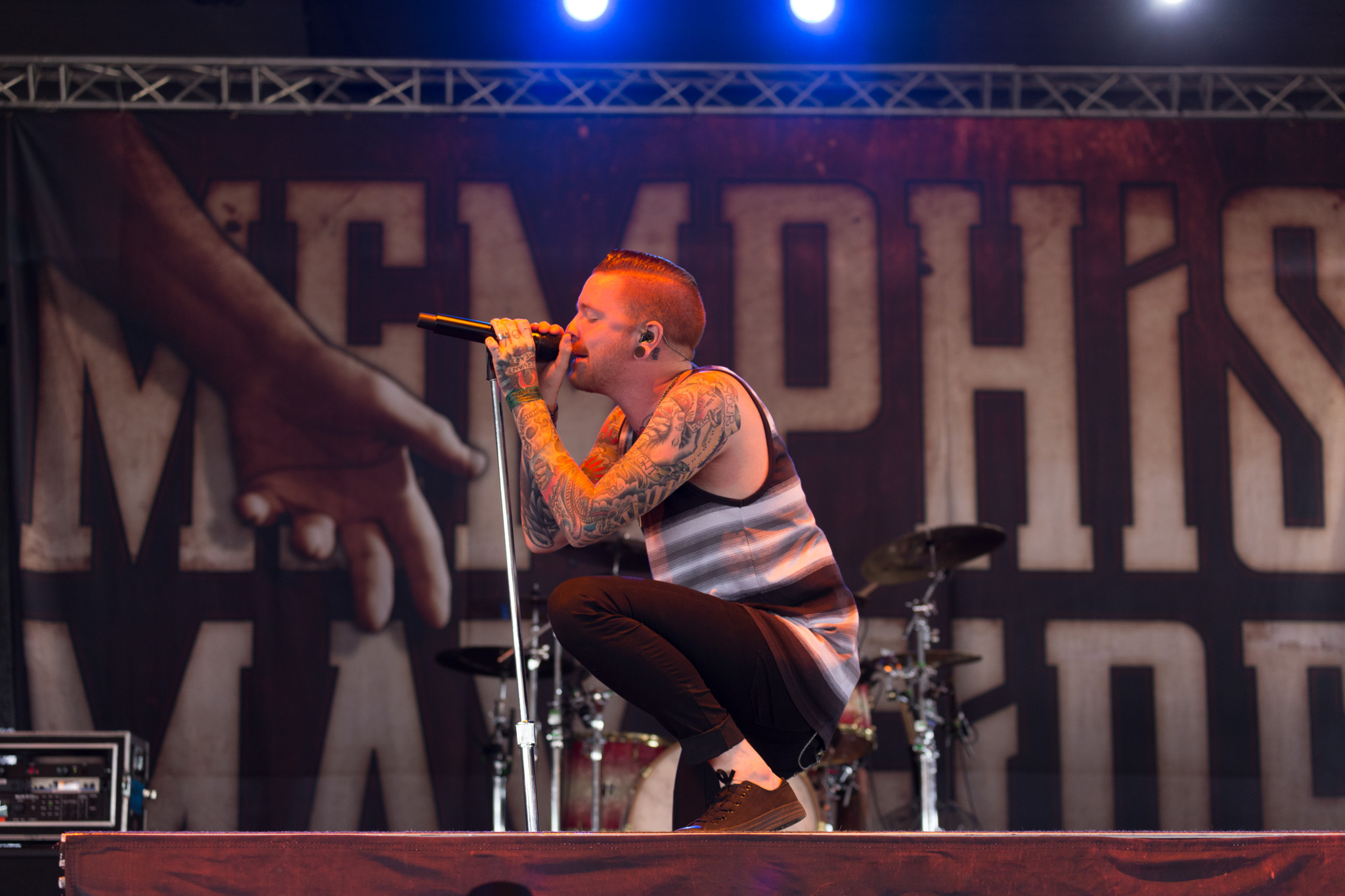
Memphis May Fire at With Full Force 2014

Memphis May Fire has announced that they are hoping to release their new album in early 2014. Kellen McGregor finished writing the album demos after the band got off of the Vans Warped Tour. Currently, the band is recording at Chango Studios with Kellen and Cameron Mizell as the producers. In an interview with PropertyOfZach, vocalist Matty Mullins stated the expected the album release date to be in February–March 2014. He also divulged that Memphis May Fire will set out on a US headlining tour in support of the album.

In an Alternative Press interview released on September 7, 2013, the band stated that their new album will "have more of a theatrical feel, as well as orchestral presence" also describing their new album as a "soundtrack to an action film".

In an interview with Propertyofzack on September 9, 2013, the band described the sound of their new album, "[It] Just shows maturity. The newest record is very theatrical. It almost feels like a movie soundtrack from start to finish. It's really awesome. A lot of orchestra stuff playing a big role in the record. It's just – it's more mature. I think that our younger audience is going to love it – certain aspects of it – and our older audience is going to really appreciate how far we've come as artists. They're really going to love the record too. It's great."

On December 14, 2013, the band tweeted that they had finished recording their forthcoming album with vocalist Matty Mullins expressing on how proud he is of the album. The album is expected to be an early 2014 release. On December 18, the band announced "The Unconditional Tour" beginning late February through March with fellow acts The Word Alive, A Skylit Drive, Hands Like Houses and Beartooth in the US.

On January 4, 2014, the band released their first studio update for their forthcoming album via Alternative Press.

In the third and final studio update for the album, it was announced that it would be titled "Unconditional" and was released on March 25, 2014, through Rise Records.

On February 6, 2014, the first single, "No Ordinary Love" was streamed through the Rise Records YouTube channel. Pre-order bundles for the album were also made available on this date. The second single, "Sleepless Nights" was released on February 24, via Facebook and Rise Records YouTube Channel.

On March 13, 2014 the full "Unconditional" album was streamed through Rise Records YouTube channel.

Mullins announced on August 12, 2014, that he would be releasing his debut solo record, "Matty Mullins", on September 23, through Rise Records. Pre-orders were made available that same day.

On May 25, 2015, the band announced that they would be releasing the deluxe edition of "Unconditional" on July 17. The first new track, 'My Generation' was released that same day. The album will contain two new tracks, as well as acoustic versions of 'Beneath the Skin' ,'Need to Be' and a remixed/remastered version of the album.

=== This Light I Hold (2016–2017) ===
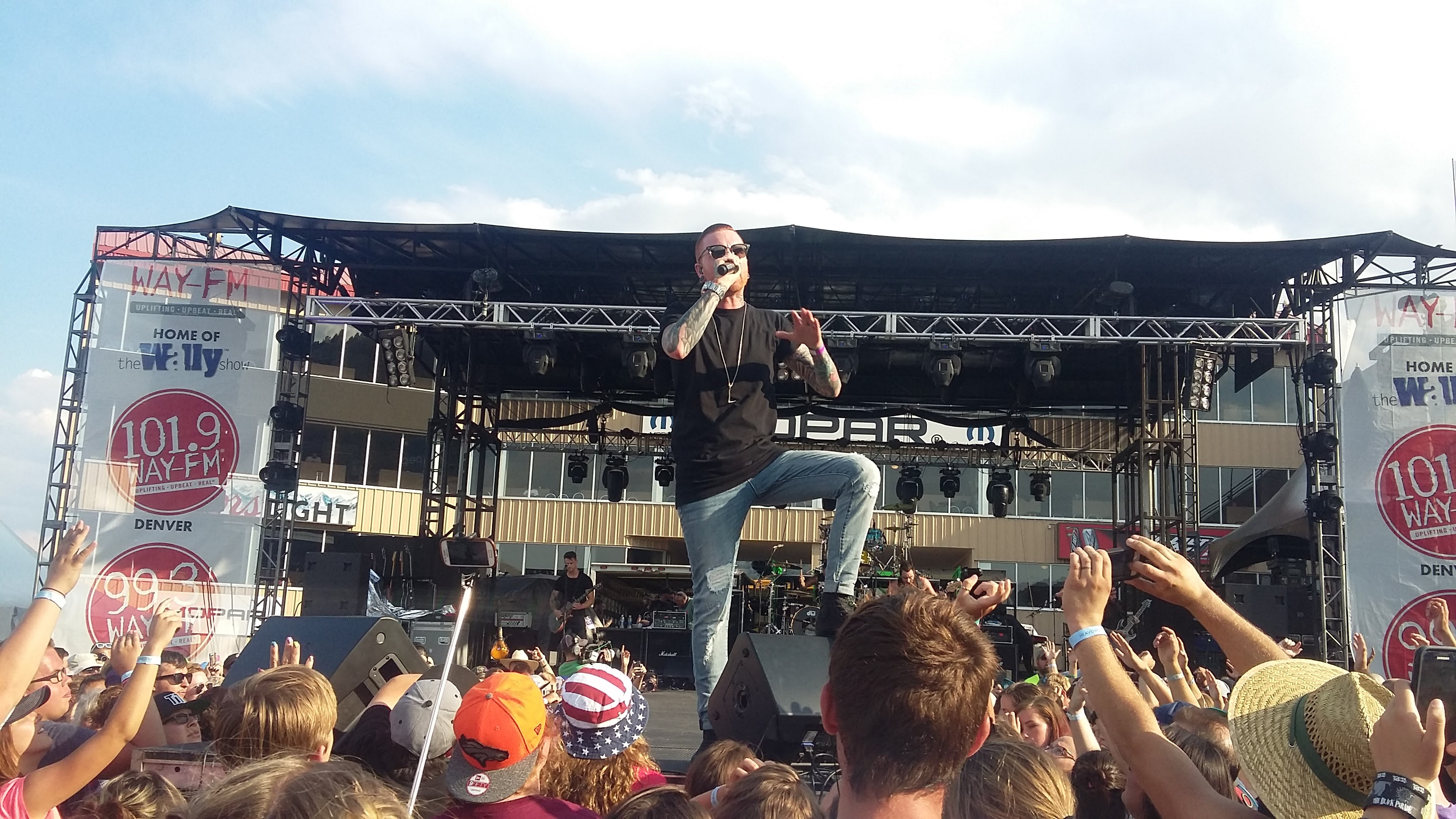
Memphis May Fire performing in 2016

On February 9, 2016, the band announced through their Facebook page that they were entering the studio with material that was written and prepared over the last year. They recorded in Good Sounds Studio with Matt Good producing and mixing the instrumentals and Cameron Mizell producing the vocals.

The band premiered the single "Carry On" on BBC Radio 1 on August 28, 2016 and announced their fifth studio album, This Light I Hold, on the same day. The album was released on October 28, 2016 through Rise Records. The band toured as headliners on the Rise Up Tour with The Devil Wears Prada and Silverstein as special guests and supporting act Like Moths to Flames in North America and the United Kingdom from October 11 to December 10, 2016.

On September 23, 2016, Memphis May Fire released the title track as the second single to their new album, "This Light I Hold," which featured Jacoby Shaddix (of Papa Roach). On January 30, 2017, the band announced the departure of guitarist Anthony Sepe. Samuel Penner, former guitarist for In the Midst of Lions and For Today, announced that he would be filling in for the band.

=== Broken (2017–2019) ===
On June 20, 2017, Memphis May Fire released a single titled "Virus". According to Matty Mullins the song is a "one-off song" and won't appear on the next album. On October 20, 2017, Matty Mullins shared a photo of them working on their new album in The Hideout Studio with Kane Churko as producer. On March 24, 2018, Matty Mullins shared a photo of Drew Fulk working on the mixes of the new album.

On September 19, 2018, the band released a new track titled "The Old Me", and information was later leaked that the new album would be titled Broken. It was released on November 16, 2018.

In April 2019, the group performed multiple shows with Pop Evil and Messer.

=== Remade in Misery (2020–2023) ===
In early 2020, frontman Matty Mullins stated he had started work on new Memphis May Fire music as well as his solo material, and that it would mark a return to their heavier roots. On June 4, 2021, the band released a new single titled "Blood & Water" which confirmed a return to their earlier, heavier sound.

Over the course of late 2021 and early 2022, the band released more singles; "Death Inside", "Bleed Me Dry", "Somebody", "Left for Dead", and "The American Dream". On February 18, 2022, the band released another single entitled "Make Believe" whilst also announcing their upcoming seventh studio album Remade in Misery set for release on June 3, 2022. On April 1, 2022, the band released another single entitled "Only Human" featuring AJ Channer from Fire from the Gods. On May 6, one month before the album release, they unveiled the last single "Your Turn". After the album's release, the band proceeded with a tour for the album with From Ashes to New, Rain City Drive, and Wolves at the Gate, during which Matty Mullins broke two ribs after a fall, but chose to finish the tour.

On September 1, 2023, the band released a new version of "Misery" featuring Brandon Saller of Atreyu. On October 10, following the song and subsequent tour with Atreyu, the alternative band Anberlin announced that lead singer Stephen Christian would be taking an indefinite hiatus from touring, and that Matty Mullins would be his live replacement for all upcoming tours starting in 2024.

=== Shapeshifter (2024–present) ===
On April 17, 2024, Memphis May Fire unveiled a brand new single "Chaotic" and its corresponding music video. On June 26, "Paralyzed", a second single, was released with a music video. More singles followed, with "Necessary Evil" appearing on July 31, "Infection" on September 4, "Hell Is Empty" on October 9, and then "Shapeshifter" on November 20, 2024, which coincided with the announcement of their album of the same name, which was released on March 28, 2025. On January 8, 2025, the band released the seventh single titled "Overdose" which featured guest vocals from Christian Lindskog of Blindside. The eighth single, "The Other Side" was released on February 19, 2025. Ahead of the album's release, the band announced the Shapeshifter tour with supporting acts Caskets, Wind Walkers and Elijah. The tour began on April 16, 2025 in Little Rock, Arkansas and concluded on May 18, 2025, at the Welcome to Rockville festival in Daytona, Florida. They are scheduled to return to Welcome to Rockville in 2026. They are also scheduled to tour Australia with blessthefall in 2026.

On March 6th, 2026, Memphis May Fire announced their "Shapeshifter World Tour", touring in Europe, Asia, Australia, and Latin America, alongside Fit for a King, Acres, 156/Silence], and Blessthefall.

== Members ==
Current members

- Kellen McGregor – lead guitar, backing vocals, keyboards, programming (2006–present); rhythm guitar (2006, 2017–present); lead vocals (2006)
- Matty Mullins – lead vocals, keyboards, programming (2008–present)
- Cory Elder – bass (2008–present)
- Jake Garland – drums (2010–present)

Former members

- Tanner Oakes – bass (2006–2008)
- Ryan Dooley – drums (2006–2007)
- Chase Ryan Robbins – lead vocals (2006–2008)
- Jeremy Grisham – drums (2007–2009)
- Austin Radford – bass (2008–2009)
- Daniel De Los Santos – bass (2008)
- Joel Seier – rhythm guitar (2009–2010)
- Eric Molesworth – drums (2009–2010)
- Ryan Bentley – rhythm guitar (2006–2009, 2010–2012)
- Anthony Sepe – rhythm guitar (2012–2017)

Former touring musicians

- Samuel Penner – rhythm guitar (2017–2019)
- Lucas Chandler – rhythm guitar (2021)

Timeline

== Discography ==
Memphis May Fire discography
- Studio albums: 8
- Extended plays: 2
- Singles: 29
- Music videos: 27

=== Studio albums ===
List of albums, with selected chart positions
Title	Album details	Peak chart positions		
Title	Album details	US	US Rock	US Heat
Sleepwalking	Released: July 21, 2009; Label: Trustkill	—	—	—
The Hollow	Released: April 26, 2011; Label: Rise	130	36	48
Challenger	Released: June 26, 2012; Label: Rise	16	5	—
Unconditional	Released: March 25, 2014; Label: Rise	4	1	—
This Light I Hold	Released: October 28, 2016; Label: Rise	42	5	—
Broken	Released: November 16, 2018; Label: Rise	—	31	—
Remade in Misery	Released: June 3, 2022; Label: Rise	—	—	—
Shapeshifter	Released: March 28, 2025; Label: Rise	—	—	—
"—" denotes a recording that did not chart or was not released in that territory

=== Extended plays ===
List of EPs, with selected chart positions
Title	EP details	Peak chart positions
Title	EP details	US Heat
Memphis May Fire	Released: December 4, 2007; Label: Trustkill; Format: Music download	—
Between the Lies	Released: November 2, 2010; Label: Bullet Tooth; Format: Music download	39
"—" denotes a recording that did not chart or was not released in that territory

=== Singles ===
Year	Song	Peak chart positions						Album
Year	Song	US Main. Rock	US Rock	US Alt.	US Hard Rock Digi.	US Hot Hard Rock	US Chr. Rock	Album
2009	"North Atlantic vs. North Carolina"	—	—	—	—	—	—	Sleepwalking
2010	"Ghost in the Mirror"	—	—	—	—	—	—	Sleepwalking
2011	"The Sinner"	—	—	—	—	—	—	The Hollow
2011	"The Unfaithful"	—	—	—	—	—	—	The Hollow
2012	"Prove Me Right"	—	19	—	—	—	—	Challenger
2012	"Vices"	—	26	—	—	—	—	Challenger
2012	"Miles Away"	—	—	—	—	—	—	Challenger
2013	"Grenade" (Bruno Mars cover)	—	11	32	—	—	—	Punk Goes Pop Volume 5
2014	"Interstate Love Song" (Stone Temple Pilots cover)	—	21	3	—	—	—	Punk Goes 90s Vol. 2
2014	"No Ordinary Love"	—	41	—	—	—	—	Unconditional
2014	"Sleepless Nights"	—	—	—	14	—	—	Unconditional
2014	"Beneath the Skin"	—	42	—	6	—	32	Unconditional
2015	"Stay the Course"	—	—	—	—	—	—	Unconditional (Deluxe Edition)
2016	"Carry On"	—	—	11	—	—	—	This Light I Hold
2016	"This Light I Hold" (featuring Jacoby Shaddix of Papa Roach)	32	38	44	—	—	30	This Light I Hold
2017	"Wanting More"	—	35	—	—	—	—	This Light I Hold
2017	"Virus"	—	—	—	—	—	—	Non-album single
2018	"The Old Me"	19	—	—	—	—	5	Broken
2019	"Live Another Day"	—	—	—	—	—	—	Broken
2019	"Heavy Is the Weight"	36	—	—	—	—	—	Broken
2021	"Blood & Water"	—	—	—	2	9	—	Remade in Misery
2021	"Death Inside"	—	—	—	—	—	—	Remade in Misery
2021	"Bleed Me Dry"	—	—	—	—	—	—	Remade in Misery
2021	"Somebody"	34	—	—	19	—	—	Remade in Misery
2021	"Left for Dead"	—	—	—	—	—	—	Remade in Misery
2022	"The American Dream"	—	—	—	—	—	—	Remade in Misery
2022	"Make Believe"	32	—	—	18	19	—	Remade in Misery
2022	"Only Human" (featuring AJ Channer of Fire from the Gods)	—	—	—	—	—	—	Remade in Misery
2022	"Your Turn"	—	—	—	—	—	—	Remade in Misery
2023	"Misery" (Original or featuring Atreyu)							Remade in Misery
2024	"Chaotic"	—	—	—	—	25	—	Shapeshifter
2024	"Paralyzed"	—	—	—	—	—	—	Shapeshifter
2024	"Necessary Evil"	—	—	—	—	—	—	Shapeshifter
2024	"Infection"	—	—	—	—	—	—	Shapeshifter
2024	"Hell Is Empty"	19	—	—	—	—	—	Shapeshifter
2024	"Shapeshifter"	—	—	—	—	—	—	Shapeshifter
2025	"Overdose" (featuring Christian Lindskog of Blindside)	—	—	—	—	—	—	Shapeshifter
2025	"The Other Side"	—	—	—	—	20	—	Shapeshifter

=== Music videos ===
Year	Album	Song	Director(s)	Type	Link
2009	Sleepwalking	"North Atlantic vs. North Carolina"	Scott Hansen	Narrative	
2010	Sleepwalking	"North Atlantic vs. North Carolina"	Mental Suplex Productions	Live	
2010	Sleepwalking	"Ghost in the Mirror"	Joshua Dixon	Narrative (Contains film footage from Saw VI)	
2011	The Hollow	"The Sinner"	Brad Golowin, Kevin Cross	Band performance	
2012	The Hollow	"The Unfaithful"	Sam Link	Live footage	
2013	Challenger	"Vices"	Thunder Down Country & Sam Link	Narrative	
2013	Challenger	"Miles Away"	Unknown	Performance	
2014	Unconditional	"No Ordinary Love"	Maria Juranic	Narrative	
2014	Unconditional	"Beneath the Skin"	Nathan William	Narrative	
2015	Unconditional	"The Rose"	Brian Thompson	Performance	
2015	Unconditional	"Stay the Course"	Caleb Mallery	Narrative	
2015	Unconditional	"My Generation"	Sam Link	Live	
2016	This Light I Hold	"This Light I Hold"	Caleb Mallery	Band performance	
2017	This Light I Hold	"Wanting More"	Bryson Roach	Band performance	
2017	This Light I Hold	"That's Just Life"	Bryson Roach	Narrative	
2017	—N/a	"Virus"	Caleb Mallery	Narrative	
2018	Broken	"The Old Me"	Caleb Mallery	Narrative	
2019	Broken	"Heavy Is the Weight"	Caleb Mallery	Performance	
2021	Remade in Misery	"Blood & Water"^{α}	Caleb Mallery	Performance	
2021	Remade in Misery	"Death Inside"^{α}	Caleb Mallery	Performance	
2021	Remade in Misery	"Bleed Me Dry"^{α}	Caleb Mallery	Performance	
2021	Remade in Misery	"Somebody"	Dustin Haney	Performance	
2021	Remade in Misery	"Left for Dead"^{α}	Caleb Mallery	Performance	
2022	Remade in Misery	"The American Dream"^{α}	Caleb Mallery	Performance	
2022	Remade in Misery	"Make Believe"	Orie McGinness	Performance	
2022	Remade in Misery	"Only Human"^{α}	Caleb Mallery	Performance	
2022	Remade in Misery	"Your Turn"^{α}	Caleb Mallery	Performance	
2022	Remade in Misery	"The Fight Within"^{α}	Caleb Mallery	Performance	
2023	Remade in Misery	"Misery"	Orie McGinness	Performance	
2024	Shapeshifter	"Chaotic"	Caleb Mallery & Matty Mullins	Performance	
2024	Shapeshifter	"Paralyzed"	Caleb Mallery & Matty Mullins	Performance	
2024	Shapeshifter	"Necessary Evil"	Caleb Mallery & Matty Mullins	Performance	
2024	Shapeshifter	"Infection"	Caleb Mallery & Matty Mullins	Performance	
2024	Shapeshifter	"Hell Is Empty"	Caleb Mallery & Matty Mullins	Performance	
2024	Shapeshifter	"Shapeshifter"	Caleb Mallery & Matty Mullins	Performance	
2025	Shapeshifter	"Overdose"	Caleb Mallery & Matty Mullins	Performance	
2025	Shapeshifter	"The Other Side"	Caleb Mallery & Matty Mullins	Performance	
2025	Shapeshifter	"Versus"	Caleb Mallery & Matty Mullins	Performance	
2025	Shapeshifter	"Love Is War"	Caleb Mallery & Matty Mullins	Performance	
2025	^α= for video visualizer.				

== Accolades ==
Nominated work	Year	Award	Result
Memphis May Fire	2014	Alternative Press Music Awards - Artist Philanthropic Award	Nominated
Jake Garland	2015	Alternative Press Music Awards - Best Drummer	Nominated
Kellen McGregor	2016	Alternative Press Music Awards - Best Guitarist	Nominated
"This Light I Hold"	2017	Alternative Press Music Awards - Best Music Video	Nominated
Remade in Misery	2023	Dove Awards - Rock/Contemporary Album of the Year	Nominated
