= Cameron Mizell =

American record producer

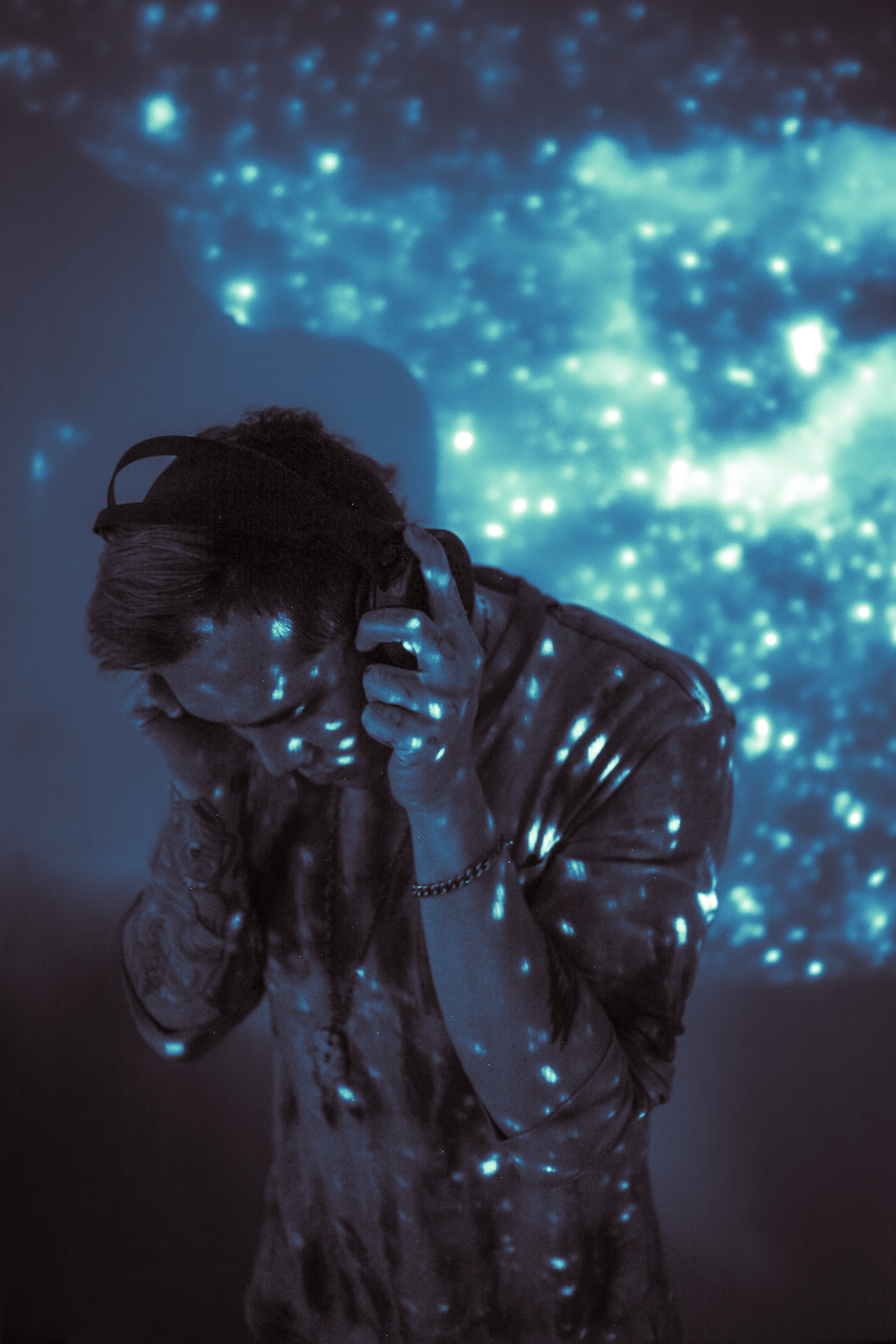

Background information
- Also known as: Chango
- Born: Cameron Pierce Mizell; September 28, 1983; New York City, U.S.
- Occupations: Record producer, songwriter, singer
- Years active: 2003–present
- Website: changoproductionstore.io

Cameron Pierce Mizell is an American record producer and the owner of Chango Studios. He began producing music in 2003 and has worked with artists such as Sleeping with Sirens, Memphis May Fire, Woe Is Me, Machine Gun Kelly, and Avril Lavigne.

He was previously the lead singer for the bands She Can't Breathe and Last Winter, who appeared on the television shows My Super Sweet 16 and The Hills. His solo project, Time Traveller – Morla and the Red Balloon, was released by Rise Records.

== Production discography ==
Year	Artist	Album title	Type	Label	Credits	Release date
2024	Starset	TokSik	Single	Fearless	associated performer programming	August 16, 2024
2024	STARSET	DEGENERATE	Single	Fearless	composer lyricist associated performer programming	May 7, 2024
2024	STARSET	Brave New World	Single	Fearless	composer lyricist associated performer programming	May 3, 2024
2022	CANTERVICE	Doomsday	Single	FiXT Music	editing fx mix master	August 7, 2022
2022	Eliza Grace	Late Checkout	Single	Self Release	co-writer mix master	January 4, 2022
2022	Avril Lavigne	Love Sux	Album	Elektra DTA	pre-production editing fx track building	February 25, 2022
2022	Memphis May Fire	Remade In Misery	Album	Rise Records	vocal producer editing fx	March 6, 2022
2021	Minute After Midnight	All Over Again	Single	Self Release	co-writer producer fx mix master	September 4, 2021
2021	Miss Fortune	The Day The Sun Died	Single	Self Release	producer fx mix master	May 2, 2021
2020	Downer Inc / Kellin Quinn	Whatever This Is	EP	MDDN	producer co-writer mix master instrumental build	September 16, 2020
2019	Danny Worsnop	Shades Of Blue	Album	Sumerian Records	master	January 3, 2019
2019	Marina	Black Cough	Single	Self Release	mix master	January 1, 2019
2019	Kayzo	Monster feat. Matty Mullins	Single	Kayzo Music	vocal producer fx vocal mix	August 14, 2019
2018	Eliza Grace	Wormwood	Album	Self Release	co-producer master	October 13, 2019
2018	Wildways	Day X	Album	Self Release	producer fx mix master	March 25, 2018
2018	Softspoken	Pathways (Deluxe Edition)	Album	Self Release	producer co-writer fx mix master	March 9, 2018
2018	Wildways	Breathless – Single	Single	TBA	producer co-writer fx mix master	March 8, 2018
2017	I, Icarus	All That's Gone	EP	Self Release	master	TBA
2017	Miss Fortune	The Bottom	Single	TBA	producer co-writer fx mix master	June 16, 2017
2017	Matty Mullins	Unstopabble	Single	BEC Recordings	producer co-writer instrumentals mix master	January 13, 2017
2017	Luke Holland	Time Harbor	Single	Self Release	producer writer vocals fx mix master	January 11, 2017
2016	Softspoken	Pathways	EP	Self Release	producer co-writer fx mix master	March 17, 2017
2016	Miss Fortune	Die For You ft. Luke Holland	Single	TBA	producer co-writer fx mix master	November 25, 2016
2016	Outline in Color	Struggle	Album	Standby Records	producer co-writer fx mix master	November 3, 2016
2015	Spoken	Breathe Again	Album	Artery	producer co-writer fx mix master	December 11, 2015
2015	To Trust A Liar	Blank Space (Taylor Swift Cover)	Single	Self Release	producer mix master	May 19, 2015
2015	Slaves	Routine Breathing	Album	Artery	producer co-writer fx mix master	August 21, 2015
2015	Light Up The Sky	Nightlife	Album	Rise Records	producer co-writer fx mix master	March 18, 2016
2016	Wildways	Into the Wild	Album	Artery	producer co-writer fx mix master	March 24, 2016
2015	Forget My Silence	Virtual Privacy	Single	Self-release	producer mix master	May 14, 2015
2015	Until The Last	Collision	Single	Self-release	master	April 26, 2015
2015	Outline In Color	Fever Frenzy	Single	StandBy	producer fx mix master	February 25, 2015
2015	Call It Home	Just A Dream	Single	Self-release	producer fx mix master	January 29, 2015
2015	Storm The Sky	Permanence	Album	UNFD/Rise	producer fx mix master	
2014	Mireau	The World In Your Way	Album	Redfield	producer co-writer fx mix master	December 1, 2014
2014	For All Those Sleeping	Incomplete Me	Album	Fearless	producer co-writer fx mix master	June 23, 2014
2014	The Word Alive	Real	Album	Fearless	producer co-writer fx mix master	June 10, 2014
2014	Me In A Million	Still In The Balance	Album	Redfield	producer co-writer fx mix master	March 28, 2014
2014	Memphis May Fire	Unconditional	Album	Rise	producer co-writer fx mix master	March 25, 2014
2014	InDirections	Clockworks	Album	InVogue	producer	February 15, 2014
2014	Capture The Crown	Live Life	EP	Self-release	producer co-writer fx mix master	February 4, 2014
2014	The Betrayer's Judgement	LEGEND$	Single	Twin Peak	mix master	January 31, 2014
2013	Time Traveller	Morla And The Red Balloon	EP	Rise	producer singer instrumental mix master	December 17, 2013
2013	Honour Crest	Spilled Ink	Album	Rise	producer mix master	December 10, 2013
2013	This Romantic Tragedy	The Illusion of Choice	EP	Self-release	producer co-writer fx mix master	November 19, 2013
2013	Myka, Relocate	Lies To Light The Way	Album	Artery	producer co-writer fx mix master	29.10 2013
2013	Hide & Dream	The Arsonist	Album	Self-release	producer fx mix master	October 25, 2013
2013	A Skylit Drive	Rise	Album	Tragic Hero	producer co-writer fx mix master	September 24, 2013
2013	Woe, Is Me	American Dream	EP	Rise	producer fx mix master (Production and Tracking by Tom Denney)	August 20, 2013
2013	Among The First	I Told You So	Single	Self-release	producer fx mix master	N/A
2013	Sleeping with Sirens	Feel	Album	Rise	producer co-writer fx	June 4, 2013
2012	Bruised But Not Broken	Just (defied)	EP	StandBy	producer co-writer fx mix master	May 21, 2012
2013	Palisades	Outcasts	Album	Rise	producer co-writer fx mix master	May 20, 2013
2013	The Gift Of Ghosts	Lost Boys	Single	Self-release	producer co-writer fx mix master	January 29, 2013
2013	Tyler Carter ft. Chris Schnapp	Collins Hill	Single	Rise, Velocity	producer co-writer fx mix master	January 26, 2013
2012	A Storm At Sea	The Wanderer	Single	Self-release	mix master	December 24, 2012
2012	Capture The Crown	'Til Death	Album	Sumerian	producer co-writer fx mix	December 18, 2012
2012	Travelers	Searching	EP	Self-release	producer co-writer fx mix master	December 11, 2012
2012	Woe, Is Me	Genesi[s]	Album	Rise, Velocity	producer co-writer fx mix master	November 20, 2012
2012	Calore	Dreaming	Single	Self-release	producer co-writer fx mix master	November 4, 2012
2012	The Last Word	Endlessly Crashing	Album	Self-release	producer co-writer fx mix master	August 21, 2012
2012	Weighed In The Balance	Relinquished	EP	Self-release	producer fx mix master	July 20, 2012
2012	Cascades	Faceless People In Faraway Places	EP	Self-release	July 17, 2012	
2012	A Hero A Fake	The Future Again	Album	Victory	mix master	July 17, 2012
2012	Woe, Is Me	Number[s] (re-issue)	Album	Rise, Velocity	producer co-writer fx mix	July 17, 2012
2012	With Crown And Tail	Europa	EP	Self-release	producer mix master	June 26, 2012
2012	Memphis May Fire	Challenger	Album	Rise	producer co-writer fx mix master	June 26, 2012
2012	For All Those Sleeping	Outspoken	Album	Fearless	producer co-writer fx mix master	June 19, 2012
2012	The Words We Use	Morals	EP	TBA	producer co-writer fx mix master	June 11, 2012
2011	New Breed	The Pioneers Of Sensation	Album	Zestone	producer co-writer fx mix master	June 6, 2012
2012	Embrace The Tide	Distances	Album	Self-release	producer fx mix master	July 30, 2012
2012	The Last Of Our Kind	A Diamond In The Rough	Album	Mediaskare	producer co-writer fx mix master	never released, leaked in July
2012	Broadway	Gentlemen's Brawl	Album	Uprising	producer co-writer fx mix master	June 19, 2012
2012	My Deepest Dream	Me, Myself & Loneliness	Single	Self-release	producer mix master	April 30, 2012
2012	Us, Ghosts	Us, Ghosts	EP	Self-release	mix master	April 29, 2012
2012	New Breed	A Little Bit Of Bitterness	EP	Zestone	producer co-writer fx mix master	April 18, 2012
2012	Crossing The Delaware	Frantic	Single	Self-release	fx mix master	April 15, 2012
2012	InDirections	Through Transitions	EP	Self-release	mix master fx	April 14, 2012
2012	Eyes Like The Sea	Revelations	EP	Self-release	April 6, 2012	
2012	The Gift Of Ghosts	To Live In Fear	Single	—N/a	producer co-writer fx mix master	March 19, 2012
2012	Hands Like Houses	Ground Dweller	Album	Rise	producer fx mix master	March 13, 2012
2012	Palisades	I'm Not Dying Today	EP	Rise	producer co-writer fx mix master	February 7, 2012
2011	Nightmares	Demo	EP	Self-release	producer fx mix master	January 31, 2012
2012	Famous Last Words	Pick Your Poison	EP	InVogue	producer co-writer fx mix master	January 17, 2012
2012	The Last Word	Crashing	EP	Self-release	producer co-writer fx mix master	January 10, 2012
2012	M31	Addemon	Single	Self-release	producer writer mix master	January 1, 2012
2011	The Requested	Twitter Me This, Batman & Bust The Chills	Singles	Self-release	mix master	2011
2011	The Gift Of Ghosts	I, The Architect	Single	—N/a	producer co-writer fx mix master	December 12, 2011
2011	Cameron Mizell	Beastie Boys – Sabotage (Dubstep Remix)	Single	Self-release	rendition fx mix master	December 10, 2011
2011	Crown The Empire	Limitless	EP	Self-release	mix master	November 29, 2011
2011	Cameron Mizell	Salt & Vinegar	Single	Self-release	producer writer vocals mix master	November 28, 2011
2011	Trees Above Mandalay	I'm Just L I V I N	Single	Self-release	mix master fx	October 12, 2011
2011	Cameron Mizell	Chango Symphony	Single	Self-release	composer mix master	October 11, 2011
2011	The Browning	Burn This World	Album	Earache	fx mix master	October 3, 2011
2011	Chasing Thrill	Forgive Forget Never Regret	EP	Self-release	producer co-writer fx mix master	September 29, 2011
2011	Fit for a King	Descendants	Album	Self-release	fx mix master	September 23, 2011
2011	Trees Above Mandalay	Don't Play The Bar So Hard	Single	Self-release	fx mix master	September 12, 2011
2011	She Can't Breathe	When The Way Is Forgotten	Album	Illuminati	producer vocals writer mix master	August 22, 2011
2011	Dream On, Dreamer	Heartbound	Album	Rise, We Are Unified	producer co-writer fx mix master	August 3, 2011
2011	That's Outrageous!	Teenage Scream	Album	Rise	producer co-writer fx mix master	July 19, 2011
2011	My Life In Ruins	My Life In Ruins	EP	Self-release	producer co-writer fx mix master	May 3, 2011
2011	Memphis May Fire	The Hollow	Album	Rise	producer co-writer fx mix master	April 26, 2011
2011	Cameron Mizell	@CMizell928	Single	Self-release	producer writer vocals fx mix master	April 17, 2011
2011	Ten After Two	Truth Is...	Album	Rise	producer co-writer fx mix	March 29, 2011
2011	I See Stars	The End of the World Party	Album	Sumerian	producer co-writer fx mix	February 22, 2011
2011	Keiko	Speechless In Sleepless Dreams	Album	Self-release	producer co-writer bass fx mix master	January 31, 2011
2011	Lead Hands	Decoder	Album	Rise	pre pro	January 17, 2011
2011	We Are Danger	Gucci Mames & Over	Singles	Self-release	mix master fx	January 13, 2011
2010	Woe, Is Me	Setlist Intro	Single	Self-release	writer producer mix master	—N/a
2010	A Bullet For Pretty Boy	Revision:Revise	Album	Artery	producer co-writer fx mix master	November 9, 2010
2010	Scare Don't Fear	Blinded	EP	Self-release	producer co-writer fx mix master	September 15, 2010
2010	I, Artificial	Perfect Perceptions" & "Hopes Of Reality	Singles	Self-release	producer co-writer fx mix master	2010
2010	Woe, Is Me	Number[s]	Album	Rise, Velocity	producer co-writer fx mix	August 31, 2010
2010	For All Those Sleeping	Cross Your Fingers	Album	Fearless	producer co-writer fx mix master	July 20, 2010
2010	We Are Danger	Existence	EP	Self-release	fx mix master	June 8, 2010
2010	Sleeping with Sirens	With Ears to See and Eyes to Hear	Album	Rise	producer co-writer fx mix master	March 22, 2010
2010	Letterbox Tragedy	Breathe Beyond Skylines	EP	Self-release	producer co-writer fx mix master	March 9, 2010
2010	Jamie's Elsewhere	They Said A Storm Was Coming	Album	Victory	producer co-writer fx mix master	February 16, 2010
2009	The Hi-Fi Horizon	Synchronizing Our Hearts	EP	Self-release	producer co-writer fx mix master	November 17, 2009
2009	Pilot Around The Stars	Pilot Around The Stars	EP	Self-release	producer co-writer fx mix master	October 22, 2009
2009	Before We Sleep	Between Dreams and Mayhem	EP	Self-release	producer co-writer fx mix master	2009
2009	Divide The Sky	Carrier Of Dreams	EP	Self-release	producer co-writer fx mix master	2009
2009	Broadway	Kingdoms	Album	Uprising	producer co-writer fx mix master	July 7, 2009
2009	Oceana	Birth Eater	Album	Rise	Producer, Audio Engineer, Audio Production, Engineer, Mastering	May 26, 2009
2009	Hand To Hand	Design the End/Follow the Horizon	Album	Lifeforce	Producer	May 8, 2009
2009	I See Stars	3-D	Album	Sumerian	producer co-writer fx mix master	April 14, 2009
2009	Of Machines	As If Everything Was Held in Place	Album	Rise	producer co-writer fx mix master	March 3, 2009
2009	Close to Home (band)	Let it Be Known	EP	Self-release	producer co-writer fx mix master	January 31, 2009
2009	The Year Ends in Arson	Vessels	Album	Indianola	producer co-writer fx mix master	January 13, 2009
2008	Andrea Gale	In The Sense Of Motion	EP	Self-release	producer co-writer fx mix master	December 26, 2008
2008	Tree and the Machine	Self Titled	EP	Self release	producer co-writer fx mix master	November 5, 2008
2008	Hand To Hand	Breaking The Surface	EP	Lifeforce	producer co-writer fx mix master	July 21, 2008
2008	Modern Day Escape	Modern Day Escape	EP	Self-release	producer co-writer fx mix master	May 2, 2008
2008	Oceana	The Tide	Album	Rise	Producer, Engineer, Guest Appearance, Mastering, Vocals, Mastering	March 4, 2008
2008	Aversia	2008 Demo	EP	Self-release	producer co-writer fx mix master	2008
2007	Last Winter	Under The Silver Of Machines	Album	Lifeforce	producer vocals co-writer fx mix master	July 24, 2007
2007	Hydrosonic	From These Pages	EP	CDBY	producer co-writer fx mix master	May 8, 2007
2007	School For Heroes	Answer	EP	Tribunal	producer co-writer fx mix master	March 17, 2007
2005	Last Winter	Transmission: Skyline	Album	Lifeforce	producer vocals co-writer fx mix master	October 4, 2005
