= Of Machines =

American post-hardcore band

- Also known as: We Are Kings
- Origin: Atlanta, Georgia, United States
- Genre: Post-hardcore
- Years active: 2006 - 2010; 2013 - 2015
- Label: Rise Records
- Past members: Austin Thornton; Bennett Freeman; Brent Guistwite; Dylan Anderson; Jon Lugo; Loniel Robinson; Mark Tanner; Michael Matejick; Wesley Hohensee

Of Machines was an American post-hardcore band from Atlanta, Georgia, United States. Formed in 2006, the band was originally known as We Are Kings. The band released their debut and only album As If Everything Was Held in Place on March 3, 2009, on Rise Records.

The band's music incorporated breakdowns and electronic music elements.

== History ==
Of Machines was formed in 2006. The band signed to Rise Records on October 14, 2008. Soon after the release of their debut album in 2009, the band embarked on a regional tour throughout North America, playing along with other notable post-hardcore bands of the time, such as Dance Gavin Dance and Sleeping with Sirens.

As If Everything Was Held in Place is the only album the band has released as Of Machines. Vocalist Dylan Anderson left the band in 2010 due to the financial burden of touring and not having a substantial place to call home, following Andersons departure the band entered a three-year hiatus. They reformed in 2013 as the original line up with the ambition to record a new EP dubbed Chroma Season/Chroma Dreamcoat which spawned demos, All Along The Greyscale and An Autobiography In Vivid Color Pt. 2 found on their YouTube channel. With the anticipation to release an EP in the latter part of 2013, the band asked for fans to contribute donations to a donation site operated through PayPal.

After a period of silence and uncertainty, the guitarist, Michael Matejick informed fans of ill-fated news that the EP could not be completed due to the absence of the band's vocalist Anderson and the disappearance of the donations. Although it was later found that the only original members that were writing and recording most if not all the new material was in fact the supposed "MIA vocalist" Dylan Anderson and unclean vocalist Bennett Freeman. Dylan Anderson also gave his response to the Alternative Press hit piece.

On May 30, 2022, unclean vocalist Bennett Freeman died at the age of 30 according to his obituary, though the cause of death was not publicly disclosed.

On January 13 and 16, of 2024, the demos for As If Everything Was Held in Place were published to both Spotify and YouTube, respectively.

== Band members ==
Final line up

- Dylan Anderson – clean vocals (2009–2010, 2013–2015)
- Bennett Freeman – screamed vocals (2006–2010, 2013–2015, died 2022)
- Jonathan Lugo – guitar, backing vocals (2006–2010, 2013–2015)
- Michael Matejick – guitar, backing vocals (2006–2010, 2013–2015)
- Mark Tanner – bass guitar, backing vocals (2006–2010, 2013–2015)

Past members

- Austin Thornton– drums (2006–2009)
- Brent Guistwite – drums (2010)
- Wesley Hohensee – drums (2013)
- Loniel Robinson – drums (2009–2010)

== Discography ==
- As If Everything Was Held in Place (2009)
- As If Everything Was Held in Place (Demo) (2024)
