= Psycho (album) =

Studio album by That's Outrageous!
- Released: October 16, 2012
- Genre: Electronicore, Metalcore, Post-hardcore, Trance
- Length: 30:05
- Label: inVogue
- Producer: Tom DeGrazia

That's Outrageous! chronology
Teenage Scream (2011)	Psycho (2012)

Singles from Psycho
- 1. "Obliviate" Released: May 12, 2012; 2. "The New York Chainsaw Massacre Pt. II" Released: September 4, 2012; 3. "Pretty Little Liars" Released: October 12, 2012

Professional ratings
Review scores
Source	Rating
AbsolutePunk	81%
Alternative Press	4/5 stars
Under The Gun Review	4.5/10 stars

Psycho is the second full-length studio album by American electronicore band That's Outrageous!. The album was released on October 16, 2012 through inVogue Records.

== Track listing ==
No.	Title	Length
1.	"Psycho"	2:33
2.	"Return to Woodsboro"	1:04
3.	"Pretty Little Liars"	3:14
4.	"Obliviate"	3:01
5.	"Vyvanse Trance"	3:30
6.	"Paging Patrick Bateman"	3:00
7.	"Flatliners"	3:01
8.	"Home Invasion 101"	2:18
9.	"Stranger Danger"	2:15
10.	"*67"	1:10
11.	"The New York Chainsaw Massacre Pt. II"	3:06
12.	"Straight to Voicemail"	1:53
Total length:		30:05

== Personnel ==
That's Outrageous!

- John Easterly – unclean vocals
- Tom DeGrazia – clean vocals, synthesizers, keyboards
- Joe Jensen - guitar
- Jonah Telyas - guitar
- Kyle Hulett - bass guitar
- Mike Ehmann - drums

Production

- Tom DeGrazia – Producer, Mixing, Composer, Mastering, Engineer
