= Akissforjersey =

American post-hardcore band

- Origin: Pilot Mountain, North Carolina
- Genres: Post-hardcore
- Years active: 2004–2009, 2009–present
- Labels: Tragic Hero, inVogue
- Members: Zach Dawson; Joey Allen; Tyler Lucas; Matt Hall; Anthony Thigpen; Cory Wood
- Past members: Matthew Bean
- Website: facebook.com/akissforjersey

Akissforjersey is an American post-hardcore band from Pilot Mountain, North Carolina formed in July 2004. The current lineup consists of vocalist Zach Dawson, drummer Joey Allen, guitarists Tyler Lucas, Cory Wood and Anthony Thigpen and bassist Matt Hall. The band released their debut studio album, Keep Your Head Above the Water, in 2006 through Tragic Hero Records. Their sophomore album Victims was released through Tragic Hero Records again in 2008. They signed to inVogue Records in 2014 and released their third album New Bodies on January 21, 2014. New Bodies was considered a breakthrough release upon the Billboard magazine charts, where it placed on the Heatseekers Albums.

== History ==
Akissforjersey formed in July 2004 in Pilot Mountain, North Carolina. Their members currently are vocalist, Zach Dawson, drummer, Joey Allen, former bassist and current guitarist Tyler Lucas, another guitarist, Bob Gassett, and current bassist, Parker Williams, with their former members, guitarists Matthew Bean and Cory Wood, who both left between 2008 and 2014. In early 2009, the band broke up, but on December 24, 2009, they reformed.

They released their debut album, Keep Your Head Above the Water, through Tragic Hero Records on August 22, 2006. Their second album, Victims, was released on May 6, 2008, by Tragic Hero Records. They subsequently signed to inVogue Records, where they released a third album, New Bodies, on January 21, 2014. The album was their breakthrough release upon the Billboard magazine charts, where it placed on the Heatseekers Albums, at a peak position of 26.

== Touring ==
The band has played at the debut Scream the Prayer Tour, along with well-known acts, Impending Doom, Sleeping Giant, Soul Embraced, Haste the Day, Before Their Eyes, and War of Ages. In August 2008, the band went on a US tour alongside War of Ages and Oh, Sleeper.

== Members ==
=== Current members ===
- Zach Dawson – vocals (2004–2009, 2009–present)
- Joey Allen – drums (2004–2009, 2009–present)
- Tyler Lucas – guitar (2009–present), bass, vocals (2004–2009)
- Cory Wood – rhythm guitar, backup vocals (2004–2009, 2022–present)

=== Past members ===
- Matthew Bean – guitar (2004–2009)
- Parker Williams – bass (2009–2022)
- Bob Gassett – guitar (2009–2022)

== Discography ==
=== Studio albums ===
Title	Album details
Keep Your Head Above the Water	Released: August 22, 2006; Label: Tragic Hero; Format: CD, DL
Victims	Released: May 6, 2008; Label: Tragic Hero (TRG-035); Format: CD, DL
New Bodies	Released: January 21, 2014; Label: inVogue; Format: CD, DL

=== Music videos ===
- "Oh, Infamous City" (2008, Victims)
- "War" (2014, New Bodies)
