= In It to Win It (disambiguation) =

The National Lottery: In It to Win It is a BBC game show that began airing in 2002.

In It to Win It may also refer to:

- In It to Win It (City Lights album), 2011
- In It to Win It (Saliva album), 2013
- In It to Win It (Charlie Wilson album), 2017
- Bring It On: In It to Win It, a 2007 teen comedy film

== See also ==
- Minute to Win It, a game show franchise
