= Something for Nothing (album) =

Studio album by Chunk! No, Captain Chunk!
- Released: November 1, 2010
- Genre: Easycore
- Length: 44:06
- Label: InVogue, Fearless
- Producer: Bertrand Poncet

Chunk! No, Captain Chunk! chronology
Chunk! No, Captain Chunk! (EP) (2008)	Something for Nothing (2010)	Pardon My French (2013)

Alternative cover
- Fearless Records 2011 release

Singles from Something for Nothing
- 1. "In Friends We Trust" Released: September 2, 2010; 2. "Captain Blood" Released: December 9, 2011

Professional ratings
Review scores
Source	Rating
Dead Press	10/10 stars
Mind Equals Blown	5.5/10
The New Review	5/5 stars
Rock Freaks	8/10

Something for Nothing is the debut album by French rock band Chunk! No, Captain Chunk!. It was released on November 1, 2010.

== Background ==
After the internet success of their self-titled EP, the band opted to record a studio album, re-recording the song "MILF" from the EP. A 5-song sampler of the album was released for free download on various internet sites in May 2010. The band used music they had written in the few years they have been a band for the album, they didn't write any new songs. The album was self-produced by their singer Bert Poncet He later commented in an interview with Rock Sound saying: "I was producing the songs using a book that was teaching me how to mix records. If it wasn't in the book, I went online to learn the rest".

== Release ==
After signing to Fearless Records with a global deal in 2011, they re-released the album on July 19, 2011. The re-release featured a brand new album artwork and a different track listing, replacing "MILF" and "Alex Kidd in Miracle World" with the song "Make Them Believe", which was a Japanese bonus track on the original release. To coincide with the re-release, the band released a music video for the single "Captain Blood", which was the lead single off the re-release, and overall second single of the album. In November and December, the group supported Blessthefall on the Fearless Friends Tour in the US. In January and February 2012, the group supported Attack Attack! on their US tour.

== Track listing ==
All music is composed by Chunk! No, Captain Chunk!.

Standard edition
No.	Title	Length
1.	"Born for Adversity"	2:55
2.	"In Friends We Trust"	3:26
3.	"Positiv-O"	3:21
4.	"We Fell Fast"	4:31
5.	"Time's Up!"	3:52
6.	"Summer Heat"	3:09
7.	"Alex Kidd in Miracle World"	1:44
8.	"Sink or Swim (S.O.S)"	4:21
9.	"Life"	3:43
10.	"Captain Blood"	3:18
11.	"For All We Know"	2:50
12.	"Milf"	3:58
13.	"XOXO"	2:58
Total length:		44:06

Japanese edition
No.	Title	Length
1.	"Born for Adversity"	2:56
2.	"In Friends We Trust"	3:27
3.	"Positiv-O"	3:22
4.	"We Fell Fast"	4:31
5.	"Time's Up!"	3:52
6.	"Summer Heat"	3:09
7.	"Alex Kidd in Miracle World"	1:45
8.	"Sink or Swim (S.O.S)"	4:21
9.	"Life"	3:43
10.	"Captain Blood"	3:19
11.	"For All We Know"	2:51
12.	"Milf"	3:58
13.	"XOXO"	2:58
14.	"Make Them Believe" (Japanese bonus track)	3:03
Total length:		47:16

2011 Reissue
No.	Title	Length
1.	"Born for Adversity"	2:58
2.	"In Friends We Trust"	3:27
3.	"Captain Blood"	3:19
4.	"Positiv-O"	3:26
5.	"Time's Up!"	3:54
6.	"Sink or Swim (S.O.S)"	4:22
7.	"We Fell Fast"	4:36
8.	"Summer Heat"	3:11
9.	"Make Them Believe"	3:02
10.	"Life"	3:46
11.	"For All We Know"	2:50
12.	"XOXO"	3:00
Total length:		41:51

== Personnel ==
Chunk! No, Captain Chunk

- Bertrand Poncet – lead vocals, keyboards
- Paul Wilson – rhythm guitar, backing vocals
- Éric Poncet – lead guitar, backing vocals
- Mathias Rigal – bass guitar
- Jonathan Donnaes – drums, percussion

Additional vocalists

- Alex of The Earl Grey (For All We Know)
- Popi of Notimefor (Summer Heat)
- Alvin of Notimefor (For All We Know & Summer Heat)
- Leo of Mary Has a Gun (For All We Know)
- Gang vocals: Chunk! No, Captain Chunk! with 'XPDCX Crew'

Recording

- Produced by Bertrand Poncet and Chunk! No, Captain Chunk!
- Recorded by Bertrand Poncet
- Mixed by Andrew Wade
- Mastered by Andy VanDette
