= Being as an Ocean (album) =

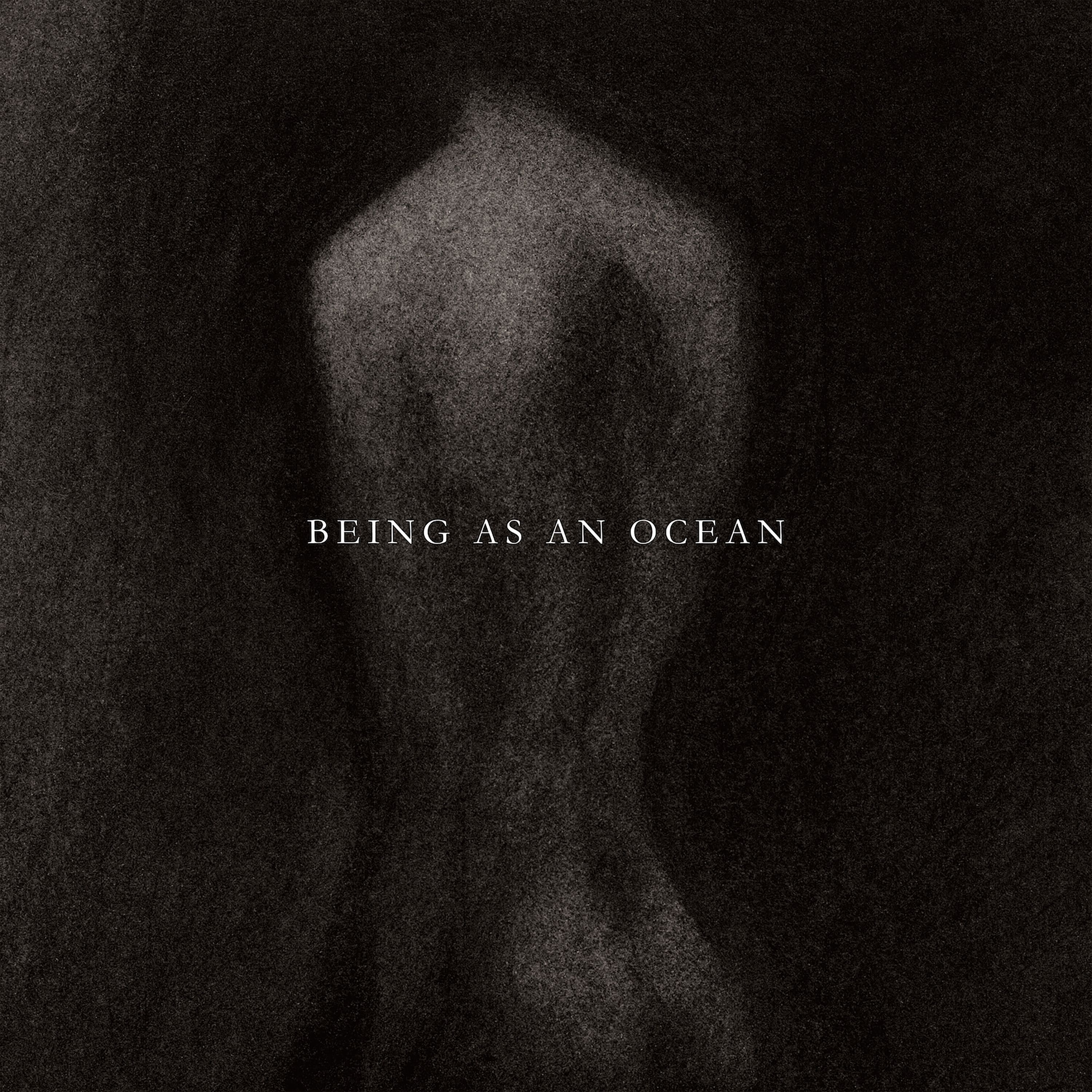

Studio album by Being as an Ocean
- Released: June 30, 2015
- Genres: Post-hardcore, melodic hardcore
- Labels: InVogue, Impericon
- Producer: Matt McClellan

Being as an Ocean chronology
| How We Both Wondrously Perish (2014) | Being as an Ocean (2015) | Waiting For Morning to Come (2017) |

Being as an Ocean is the third full-length album by American post-hardcore band Being as an Ocean. The album was released on June 30, 2015, through InVogue Records internationally and Impericon Records in Europe. This is the band's second record to feature clean vocalist and rhythm guitarist Michael McGough, and their final album to feature drummer Connor Denis.

Professional ratings
Review scores
| Source | Rating |
|---|---|
| New Noise Magazine | 4/5 stars |
| GIGsoup | 4/5 stars |
| PPcorn | 3.8 stars on a 5 point scale |
| Bring The Noise | 10/10 |

== Lyrical themes ==
On the first track from the album, 'Little Richie', lead vocalist Joel Quartuccio stated that the song "was inspired by the story of my personal friend and pastor, Rich McCullen. Rich grew up in an extremely abusive household and yet still grew up to forgive his abuser and strives to live a life of love and compassion."

== Critical reception ==
New Noise Magazine awarded the album 4 out of 5 stars, stating that "Being As An Ocean is an interesting study in progression by regression. By reigning in some of the more progressive and musically interesting aspects of How We Both Wondrously Perish, the band was able to focus on a unified sound: punchy, pensive bouts of melodic hardcore. It’s not a novel concept, but with this much emotion and focus, Being As An Ocean seems on the road to something truly special. They aren’t there yet, but after a slight recalculation, the destination appears on the horizon."

GIGsoup shared similar enthusiasm for the album, with their review concluding that "with their self-titled album, Being As An Ocean once again escape the cliches of the genre (there’s not a single breakdown on the album, for example) and continue to bolster their sound with some spectacular vocal work while also adding a few more killer tunes to their live repertoire."

== Track listing ==
| No. | Title | Length |
|---|---|---|
| 1. | "Little Richie" | 3:38 |
| 2. | "Ain't Nobody Perfect" | 4:00 |
| 3. | "The Zealot's Blindfold" | 4:09 |
| 4. | "Sleeping Sicarii" | 3:34 |
| 5. | "Judas, Our Brother" | 3:29 |
| 6. | "St. Peter" | 4:00 |
| 7. | "Forgetting is Forgiving the I" | 4:00 |
| 8. | "The World as a Stage" | 3:00 |
| 9. | "Sins of the Father" | 3:58 |
| 10. | "...And Their Consequence" | 5:46 |
| Total length: | | 39:34 |

== Personnel ==
- Joel Quartuccio – unclean vocals, spoken word
- Michael McGough – rhythm guitar, clean vocals
- Tyler Ross – lead guitar
- Ralph Sica – bass guitar
- Connor Denis – drums
