= How We Both Wondrously Perish =

Studio album by Being as an Ocean
- Released: May 6, 2014
- Genres: Post-hardcore, melodic hardcore
- Length: 39:02
- Label: InVogue
- Producer: Matt McClellan

Being as an Ocean chronology
Dear G-d... (2012)	How We Both Wondrously Perish (2014)	Being as an Ocean (2015)

How We Both Wondrously Perish is the second full-length album by American post-hardcore band Being as an Ocean. The album was released on May 6, 2014 on InVogue Records, and is the band's first record to feature rhythm guitarist Michael McGough and drummer Connor Denis.

== Critical reception ==
Professional ratings
Review scores
Source	Rating
AllMusic	3.5/5 stars
Alternative Press	3.5/5 stars
ChristCore	4/5 stars
HM Magazine	3.5/5 stars
Substream Magazine	3/5 stars

How We Both Wondrously Perish garnered generally positive reception from the ratings and review of music critics. At Alternative Press, Scott Heisel rated the album three-and-a-half stars out of five, indicating how the release "is significantly more concise and effective than its predecessor". Gregory Heaney of AllMusic rated the album three-and-a-half out of five stars, remarking how "The interplay between the two singers' styles is mirrored in the music, which effortlessly oscillates between rapturous ambience and bittersweet drive, giving the band a sound that few of its post-hardcore brethren even come close to touching." At HM Magazine, Sarah Dos Santos rated the album three-and-a-half stars out of five, observing how the group "carrying a unique sound" because it "is peppered with melody and spoken-word, standing out from the rest." Jonathan Kemp of Substream Magazine rated the album three stars out of five, calling it "a great addition to BAAO's catalogue, but it will most certainly not go down as the band’s defining record." At ChristCore, Anthony Ibarra rated the album four out of five stars, affirming how the band "emerges victorious with this album."

== Track listing ==
No.	Title	Length
1.	"Mediocre Shakespeare"	3:41
2.	"Death's Great Black Wing Scrapes the Air"	4:19
3.	"L'exquisite Douleur"	3:55
4.	"How We Both Wondrously Perish"	1:10
5.	"The Poets Cry for More"	3:29
6.	"We Drag the Dead on Leashes"	4:55
7.	"Even the Dead Have Their Tasks"	3:26
8.	"Grace, Teach Us What We Lack" (featuring Johnny O'Hagan of Idlehands)	4:24
9.	"Mothers"	5:06
10.	"Natures"	4:46
Total length:		39:02

== Personnel ==
Being as an Ocean

- Joel Quartuccio – unclean vocals, spoken word, clean vocals on tracks 7–10
- Michael McGough – rhythm guitar, clean vocals
- Tyler Ross – lead guitar
- Ralph Sica – bass guitar
- Connor Denis – drums

== Chart performance ==
Chart (2014)	Peak position
US Billboard 200	57
US Top Alternative Albums (Billboard)	10
US Top Hard Rock Albums (Billboard)	2
US Independent Albums (Billboard)	9
US Top Rock Albums (Billboard)	17
