= Nick Moore (musician) =

American musician (born 1983)

- Born: Nicholas Stephen Moore; July 17, 1983 (age 43)
- Origin: Findlay
- Genres: Alternative rock, post-hardcore
- Occupations: Songwriter musician Record label owner
- Instruments: Vocals guitar Keyboards; Programming
- Years active: 2003–present
- Labels: Thriller Records inVogue Records; StandBy Records
- Website: www.nickmoore.me

Nick Moore (born July 17, 1983) is an American musician known as the lead vocalist and primary songwriter of the band Before Their Eyes on Rise Records.

On April 18, 2010, Moore announced that he would be leaving Before Their Eyes and asked for support for his new project, later revealed to be Planet AD. However, on December 26, 2010, he announced via Facebook that he was back in Before Their Eyes.

Moore is also known for starting the record label StandBy Records in 2007, which signed the American Billboard charting band Emarosa and the international recording artist Hopes Die Last. In 2008, Moore sold the company to HM-Live's owner, Neil Sheehan. In August 2009, he started a new record label called inVogue Records. With inVogue, he signed the recording artist The Plot in You and other rock and post-hardcore bands. Notable artists on InVogue Records include pop-punk giants Chunk! No, Captain Chunk!, San Diego melodic hardcore band Being As An Ocean, metalcore band Famous Last Words, and spoken-word project Hotel Books.

Moore was also the vocalist and played guitar for the pop/punk band The Drama Summer.

In early 2013 Nick announced he started a new band called Gentlemen Roosevelt that he does vocals and plays guitar in.

On November 15, 2017 Nick opened up a retail clothing shop called Flag City Clothing. In July 2021 he sold the company.

In June 2021 Alternative Press announced the launch of Thriller Records founded by Nick and Bob Becker (Founder of Fearless Records).

== Personal life ==
Nick is married and resides in Orange County, California and Cleveland, Ohio.
