= Pardon My French (Chunk! No, Captain Chunk! album) =

Studio album by Chunk! No, Captain Chunk!
- Released: April 30, 2013
- Studio: The Foundation Estate, 37
- Genre: Metalcore, pop punk
- Length: 39:23
- Label: Fearless
- Producer: Joey Sturgis

Chunk! No, Captain Chunk! chronology
Something for Nothing (2011)	Pardon My French (2013)	Get Lost, Find Yourself (2015)

Singles from Pardon My French
- 1. "Restart" Released: March 18, 2013; 2. "Taking Chances" Released: April 16, 2013

Deluxe Edition cover

Pardon My French is the second album by French rock band Chunk! No, Captain Chunk!. The album was released on April 30, 2013, on Fearless Records. The album was produced by Joey Sturgis, a well-known metalcore producer. It is the last album with original drummer Jonathan Donnaes.

== Background ==
The album was produced by Joey Sturgis, a well-known metalcore producer. Sessions were held at The Foundation Estate; the drums were recorded at 37 Studios, with the aid of Chris Suitt, and drum editor Jeff Dune. Gang vocals were done by Jacob Matzkows, Spencer Maybe, Andy Loy, and Kristen Woutersz, and were edited by Kacey Dodson. Sturgis and Nick Scott served as engineers; Sturgis mixed and mastered the final album. Because the band had a producer for this album, singer Bertrand Poncet, who acted as a producer for the first album, could focus more on song writing.

The band announced the album's cover art, track listing and release date on 11 March 2013.

== Cover art and title ==
The expression Pardon My French as a title was picked because, in Poncet's words, "is rude and classy at the same time[...] and that is exactly who we are and what our music is about." The album's cover art, a parody of Coldplay's Viva la Vida or Death and All His Friends, features the painting, Napoleon Crossing the Alps, with Napoleon and his horse's eyes painted over.

== Release and promotion ==
On 4 March 2013, Pardon My French was announced for release in April. In addition, a studio update video was posted online. On 11 March, the album's cover art was revealed. Originally, the band was supposed to headline the Pardon My French Tour in March and April 2013; instead, the band went on tour with A Day to Remember on the Right Back at It Again Tour. In April, the group eventually went on the Pardon My French Tour. They were supported For All Those Sleeping, Upon This Dawning and City Lights. On April 26, in the lead up to the Pardon My French's release Chunk! No, Captain Chunk! unveiled each track each half an hour with a different online publication. Each song was released in track order starting with "Bipolar Mind" through: Alternative Press, Hot Topic, Absolute Punk, Metal Injection, Revolver Magazine, Loudwire, Pure Volume, Boom Movement, Artist Direct, and then Noise Creep. Pardon My French was released on 30 April through Fearless Records. A music video was released for "Haters Gonna Hate" on Vevo on 24 October. In November, the group embarked on a headlining US tour with support from Counterparts, State Champs and Living with Lions.

On 13 May 2014, it was announced that the band will be releasing a deluxe version of their second album Pardon My French, which featured 3 previously unreleased tracks and an acoustic version of Taking Chances, and was released on June 17.

== Reception ==
Professional ratings
Review scores
Source	Rating
AllMusic	3/5 stars
Alternative Press	3.5/5 stars
Big Cheese	7/10 stars
Revolver	2.5/5

=== Commercial ===
The album debuted at No. 72 on Billboard 200, No. 20 on Top Rock Albums and No. 15 on Alternative Albums, with 12,000 copies sold in its first week. It has sold 44,000 copies in the US as of May 2015.

== Track listing ==
All music and lyrics written by Chunk! No, Captain Chunk!.

No.	Title	Length
1.	"Restart"	3:28
2.	"Taking Chances"	3:07
3.	"Bipolar Mind"	2:57
4.	"Haters Gonna Hate"	3:21
5.	"The Progression of Regression"	3:44
6.	"Pardon My French"	2:59
7.	"Between Your Lines"	3:35
8.	"I Am Nothing Like You"	2:49
9.	"Reasons to Turn Back"	3:25
10.	"So Close and Yet So Far"	2:34
11.	"Miles and Decibels"	3:27
12.	"The Best Is Yet to Come"	3:57
Total length:		39:23

Deluxe version
No.	Title	Length
13.	"Good for You"	3:12
14.	"Insanity"	3:40
15.	"Kids"	3:35
16.	"Taking Chances" (acoustic)	2:56
Total length:		52:46

== Personnel ==
Personnel per booklet.

Chunk! No, Captain Chunk!

- Bertrand Poncet – lead vocals
- Éric Poncet – guitar
- Paul Cordebard – guitar
- Mathias Rigal – bass
- Jonathan Donnaes – drums

Additional musicians

- Jacob Matzkows – gang vocals
- Spencer Maybe – gang vocals
- Andy Loy – gang vocals
- Kristen Woutersz – gang vocals

Production and design

- Joey Sturgis – producer, mixing, mastering, engineer
- Nick Scott – engineer
- Kacey Dodson – vocal editing
- Jeff Dunne – drum editing
- Chris Suitt – drums recording
- Florian Mihr – album layout
- Jonathan Weiner – photography

== Charts ==
Chart (2013)	Peak position
US Top Alternative Albums (Billboard)	15
US Independent Albums (Billboard)	15
US Top Rock Albums (Billboard)	20
US Billboard 200	72
