= In It to Win It (City Lights album) =

In It To Win It

Studio album by City Lights
- Released: November 8, 2011
- Recorded: 2011
- Studio: Capital House Records, Galena, Ohio
- Genre: Pop punk, melodic hardcore, easycore
- Length: 33:52
- Label: InVogue
- Producer: Nick Ingram

City Lights chronology
Rock Like a Party Star (2009)	In It To Win It (2011)	The Way Things Should Be (2013)

Singles from In It to Win it
- 1. "Where You've Been" Released: October 17, 2011; 2. "What It Takes" Released: April 16, 2012; 3. "Trophy Room" Released: May 24, 2012

Professional ratings
Review scores
Source	Rating
SputnikMusic	4/5 stars
MusicReview	74/100

In It to Win It is the first full-length album by American punk rock band City Lights, released on November 8, 2011. It was InVogue Records first release to land on any Billboard chart, having debuted at number 29 on Alternative New Artist and 117 on Top New Artist. The album was recorded and produced by Nick Ingram at Capital House Records in Galena, Ohio. The band went through a number of line-up changes between their first EP Rock Like a Party Star and the recording of this album.

== Background ==
=== Signing to InVogue Records ===
In 2011, bassist Chase Clymer contacted the CEO of Ohio-based record label InVogue Records, Nick Moore. Clymer negotiated a one album deal with Moore, the band signed to InVogue Records in May 2011. A press release stated the band had recently signed with InVogue Records and would be releasing their debut record on July 26, the album was later pushed back to November 8, 2011. The first single from the album "Where You've Been" was released on October 17, 2011 in the run up to the album's release, a music video accompanied the single and was directed by Duncan Johnson.

=== Reception ===
Upon release, the album received some moderate success, shooting the band onto the Billboard music charts. While some critics struggled to get on side with the album, it has become a seminal record among the easycore community. Alternative Press published a review claiming the band were "...five young men taking themselves far too seriously."

== Track listing ==
All songs written by City Lights.

No.	Title	Length
1.	"Intro"	0:51
2.	"Hang Out"	3:35
3.	"Please Let Me Know"	3:03
4.	"Where You've Been"	3:54
5.	"Trophy Room"	3:13
6.	"My Entire Life"	3:55
7.	"Just in Case"	2:48
8.	"Lawnmower"	2:44
9.	"I Made a Song on Garage Band and All I Got Was This Lousy Record Deal"	4:00
10.	"What It Takes"	3:11
11.	"Lawnmower (Acoustic)"	2:38
Total length:		33:52

== Personnel ==
- Oshie Bichar – vocals
- Jeremy Smith – lead guitar, backing vocals
- Kamron Bradbury – rhythm guitar
- Chase Clymer – bass guitar, backing vocals
- Sean Smith – drums

Additional personnel

- Caleb Shomo – backing vocals
