= Midwest Modesty =

Studio album by Before Their Eyes
- Released: December 18, 2015
- Genres: Post-hardcore, alternative rock
- Length: 34:09
- Label: InVogue
- Producer: Craig Owens

Before Their Eyes chronology
Redemption (2012)	Midwest Modesty (2015)

Midwest Modesty is the fifth studio album from Before Their Eyes. InVogue Records released the album on December 18, 2015.

== Background ==
The band got Craig Owens to produce the album and be their co-writer on every song.

== Critical reception ==
Professional ratings
Review scores
Source	Rating
Jesus Freak Hideout	4.5/5 stars
New Noise Magazine	3/5 stars

Signaling in a three star review by New Noise Magazine, Nathaniel Lay states, "Midwest Modesty probably doesn’t beat out the Before Their Eyes debut for most fans (no surprise there), but it could very well become the runner-up in the band’s discography. It’s well written, tight, and (for the most part) organized in a successful flow." Kevin Hoskins, indicating in a four and a half star review at Jesus Freak Hideout, writes, "So what does Midwest Modesty have in store? Simply put, it's an album that all current BTE fans and hard rock lovers will deeply appreciate."

== Track listing ==
All tracks are written by Before Their Eyes and Craig Owens.

No.	Title	Length
1.	"It's Dark Inside with You"	3:45
2.	"The Positive and the Negative of Being Alone"	3:58
3.	"We Won't Make the Same Mistake Again" (featuring Hotel Books)	4:15
4.	"How It Feels to Be Defeated"	3:30
5.	"Anything's Possible in New Jersey"	4:06
6.	"Midwest Modesty"	2:45
7.	"A Home With No Ceilings"	3:22
8.	"We Destroyed All the Evidence"	3:25
9.	"Noise"	1:32
10.	"Adam Was a Cool Dude"	3:31
Total length:		34:09

== Chart performance ==
Chart (2016)	Peak position
US Heatseekers Albums (Billboard)	7
