= Get Lost, Find Yourself =

Studio album by Chunk! No, Captain Chunk!
- Released: 18 May 2015
- Recorded: Los Angeles, California
- Genre: Melodic metalcore, pop punk
- Length: 34:45
- Label: Fearless
- Producer: Kyle Black

Chunk! No, Captain Chunk! chronology
Pardon My French (2013)	Get Lost, Find Yourself (2015)	Gone Are the Good Days (2021)

Singles from Get Lost, Find Yourself
- 1. "Playing Dead" Released: 24 March 2015; 2. "The Other Line" Released: 20 April 2015

Get Lost, Find Yourself is the third studio album by French rock band Chunk! No, Captain Chunk!, released on 18 May 2015. It is their first album without founding drummer Jonathan Donnaes, who left the band to spend time with his fiancée in August 2014.

== Release and reception ==
The first single, "Playing Dead", was released on 24 March 2015. The second single, "The Other Line" was released on 20 April. The album was released on 18 May through Fearless Records.

Reviewing the album for Kerrang!, Tom Shepherd said the band "stack their sound in favour of their saccharine melodies" matched with a "more measured use of the chuggy breakdowns" and as a result the album benefits. The album was included at number 28 on Rock Sound's top 50 releases of 2015 list.

== Track listing ==
No.	Title	Length
1.	"Playing Dead"	3:32
2.	"City of Light"	3:08
3.	"The Other Line"	3:29
4.	"Set It Straight"	3:12
5.	"Pull You Under"	3:24
6.	"What Goes Around"	3:50
7.	"Worst Case Scenario"	3:32
8.	"Twist the Knife"	3:20
9.	"Get Lost, Find Yourself"	3:19
10.	"Every Moment"	3:56

== Personnel ==
Chunk! No, Captain Chunk!

- Bert Poncet – lead vocals
- Éric Poncet – lead guitar, backing vocals
- Paul "Wilson" Cordebard – rhythm guitar, backing vocals
- Mathias Rigal – bass
- Bastien Lafaye – drums, percussion

Production

- Kyle Black – producer, engineer, mixing

== Charts ==
Chart (2015)	Peak position
US Billboard 200	113
US Billboard Alternative Albums	13
US Billboard Hard Rock Albums	9
US Billboard Independent Albums	14
US Billboard Top Album Sales	58
US Billboard Top Rock Albums	19
