= That's Outrageous! =

American post-hardcore band

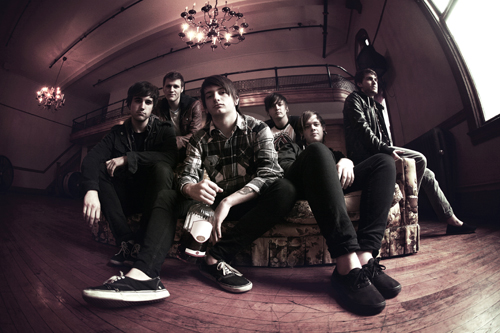

Background information
- Origin: Poughkeepsie, New York
- Genres: Post-hardcore; electronicore
- Years active: 2010–2013
- Labels: InVogue; Rise; WMG
- Past members: Tom DeGrazia; Doriano Magliano; Joe Jensen; Christopher Stewart; Max Wyre; Greg Adams; David Newton; Randy Burnham; Zach DeGaetano; John Easterly; Mike Ehmann; Kyle Hulett; Jonah Teylas; Bryce Kariger

That's Outrageous! was an American post-hardcore band from Poughkeepsie, New York, formed in the winter of 2010. They were signed to Rise Records in March 2011, shortly after releasing two self-produced demos on PureVolume. The band released two full-length albums before disbanding in 2013. Despite releasing two albums, they never made a music video.

== History ==
=== Formation and debut album (2010–2011) ===
That's Outrageous! was formed in the late winter of 2010 by Tom DeGrazia, Max Wrye, Doriano Magliano, Joe Jensen, and Greg Adams. The band signed to Rise Records on March 24, 2011, and announced their debut album would be produced by Cameron Mizell. They released their first single, #Winning, the same day.

On March 27, 2011, the band posted a live video of vocalist Doriano Magliano working with Of Mice & Men vocalist Austin Carlile on a track for the band's forthcoming album. Later that day the band was announced as part of Rise Records' first annual tour, along with Memphis May Fire, Decoder and Ten After Two. Guitarist David Newton was recruited before the band departed for the tour on May 7, 2011. Shortly after the tour started, the band announced they had parted ways with DeGrazia.

The title track off their forthcoming album, Teenage Scream, was released on May 14, 2011. The full-length album was released on July 19, 2011, via Rise Records.

The band released a 7-inch split EP with The Ready Set on August 16. The white vinyl was limited to 1,000 copies. After the release of the EP, it was announced that guitarist David Newton had been kicked out of the band.

In September 2011, the band announced Christopher Stewart (formerly of Sweatshirt Weather) as their new vocalist and Randy Burnham as their new guitarist. In the fall of 2011, they supported Of Mice & Men on the Monster Energy Outbreak Tour along with I See Stars, Iwrestledabearonce, For the Fallen Dreams and Abandon All Ships. The tour started in San Francisco, California on October 26 and went through North America, ending in Pittsburgh, Pennsylvania on November 29, with the majority of the shows being sold out. Stewart filled in on clean vocals for Of Mice & Men midway through the tour after the departure of Shayley Bourget.

The band toured with My Ticket Home and Casino Madrid in January and February 2012 as part of the "A New Breed" tour.

=== Lineup changes and second album (2012–2013) ===
On March 8, 2012, Magliano announced that he would be providing vocals for Atlanta-based metalcore band Woe, Is Me on the upcoming Fire & Ice Tour with We Came As Romans, blessthefall, Emmure.

On April 16, 2012, it was announced that Magliano, Stewart, and Wrye had departed That's Outrageous!. Shortly after, Magliano officially joined Woe, Is Me and Wrye started playing drums for Alex Goot's live band.

On May 17, 2012, the remaining members announced that former vocalist Tom DeGrazia had rejoined the band. They released a new song, "Obliviate", featuring DeGrazia on vocals. Shortly after, guitarist Joe Jensen, guitarist Randy Burnham, and bassist Greg Adams left the band, leaving DeGrazia as the only remaining member. DeGrazia recruited John Easterly, Mike Ehmann, Kyle Hulett, Zach DeGaetano, and Jonah Teylas as replacements.

On June 14, 2012, the band announced that they had signed to InVogue Records for the release of their second full-length album. The album, Psycho, was released October 16, 2012.

On November 14, 2012, the band's cover of the song, "This Time Next Year" appeared as the fourth track on the compilation album, A Tribute To the Movielife". This track featured former vocalists Stewart and Magliano.

On January 2, 2013, the band released an acoustic cover of The Get Up Kids' "How Long Is Too Long" as a part of Pacific Ridge Records' "A Tribute To The Get Up Kids" compilation album.

On July 27, 2013, bassist Kyle Hulett announced that he had left the band.

On August 27, 2013, the band released a new single, "Overwhelmed".

As of July 11, 2014, their Facebook page has been renamed to The New Violence.

== Band members ==
Final line-up

- Tom DeGrazia – clean vocals, keyboards (2010–2011, 2012–2014)
- Taylor Enzminger – drums (2013–2014)

Former members

- David Newton – guitar (2010–2011)
- Doriano Magliano – unclean vocals (2010–2012), clean vocals (2011)
- Christopher Stewart – clean vocals (2011–2012)
- Max Wyre – drums (2010–2012)
- Joe Jensen – guitar (2010–2012)
- Randy Burnham – guitar (2011–2012)
- Greg Adams – bass (2010–2012)
- Zach DeGaetano – guitar (2012–2013)
- John Easterly – unclean vocals (2012–2013)
- Mike Ehmann – drums (2012–2013)
- Kyle Hulett – bass guitar (2012–2013)
- Jonah Telyas – guitar (2012–2013)
- Bryce Kariger – unclean vocals, guitar, bass (2013)

== Discography ==
Studio albums

- Teenage Scream (July 19, 2011, Rise Records)
- Psycho (October 16, 2012, InVogue Records)

Singles

- "#Winning" (2011)
- "Teenage Scream" (2011)
- "Headshot at the Ballet Recital" (2011)
- "Obliviate" (2012)
- "The New York Chainsaw Massacre Pt. II" (2012)
- "Pretty Little Liars" (2012)
- "Overwhelmed" (2013)
