= City Lights (band) =

American pop punk band

- Origin: Columbus, Ohio, U.S.
- Genres: Pop punk, easycore, emo pop
- Years active: 2008–2014, 2015
- Label: InVogue
- Member of: Beartooth
- Formerly of: Before My Eyes, Double S, Freshman 15, Sleeping With Sirens, Though She Wrote
- Past members: Oshie Bichar; Chris Boisvert; Kamron Bradbury; Chase Clymer; Will Deely; Joey Kasouf; Zachary LeCompte-Goble; Hartley Lewis; Brandon McMaster; Jeremy Smith; Sean Smith; Jack Snyder
- Website: www.citylightspoppunk.com

City Lights was an American pop punk band from Columbus, Ohio, formed in 2008 by Zachary LeCompte-Goble and Hartley Lewis. They released two EPs and two studio albums during their six-year tenure; the latest being The Way Things Should Be, released on December 10, 2013, via InVogue Records. The band signed to InVogue in May 2011. The band announced their dissolution on February 13, 2014. One year later on February 13, 2015, they released a third EP titled Acoustic EP 2. They announced that they had no intention of getting back together but if schedules permitted they would still take part in shows and put out music.

== History ==
=== Formation and Rock Like a Party Star EP (2008–2010) ===
City Lights formed in early 2008 in Columbus, Ohio when Zachary LeCompte-Goble got some friends together one night to play Pop Punk instead of Metalcore. The first song the band ever wrote together was "Make A Sound". The original lineup was Zachary LeCompte-Goble, Sean Smith, Joey Kasouf and Hartley Lewis. An old friend of Zachary LeCompte-Goble and Sean Smith, Oshie Bichar, was soon added on vocals. Lewis left the band after he was accepted to New York University, and Jack Snyder would take his place on guitar. After booking a tour for Mayday Parade, Zachary LeCompte-Goble asked Brooks Betts of Mayday Parade to manage the band, and he agreed, which aided the band's rise from the local circuit to a touring band, however Brooks stepped down due to his own band commitments and LeCompte-Goble moved to Los Angeles in 2009. The band began to work with Thomas Gutches of The Artery Foundation. Their debut EP Rock Like A Party Star was self-released on April 14, 2008, which has sold over 5,000 copies to date without label or management promotion. It was recorded with Bobby Leonard at Paper Tiger Studios in Columbus, OH. On June 15, 2010, the band's cover of Third Eye Blind's "I’ll Never Let You Go" was featured on Alter The Press's Rockin’ Romance 2 compilation. Following this release, guitarist Jack Snyder departed and Jeremy Smith joined the band a few months before they were signed to InVogue Records.

=== In It to Win It and Acoustic EP (2011–2012) ===
In 2011, Nick Moore was contacted by bassist Chase Clymer seeking interest in putting out the band's next EP. Shortly after, Moore and the band agreed to a LP deal and were offered a contract within 24 hours. On November 9, 2011, the band released their first album, In It to Win It, via InVogue. The band recorded In It To Win It in 10 days with Nick Ingram at Capital House Records in Galena, OH. The album art was a joint effort between Clymer's photography and Shawn Khemsurov's graphical presentation. Prior Though She Wrote guitarist Kamron Bradbury joined the band in 2011 to replace Joey Kasouf. Turnist Brandon McMaster fill in for Jeremy Smith on two tours in 2012, with Smith always staying in the line-up. This would finally round out the band to its current line-up. The band co-headlined the Jupiter Clothing sponsored "Tour Up! From The Floor Up!" Tour (March 2012) with Freshmen 15. In It To Win It was InVogue's first release to land on any Billboard chart, having debuted at number 29 on Alternative New Artist and 117 on Top New Artist. The band announced in mid-2012 that they had "only signed with InVogue Records to release a single album, and that was In It To Win It; [and that the band is] still on great terms with Nick Moore and the rest of the InVogue Records family." City Lights released their Acoustic EP on December 18, 2012, via InVogue; which comprised five acoustic tracks from their debut album.

=== The Way Things Should Be (Late 2012–2013) ===
The band began writing and recording for their second album in the fall of 2012. The band launched a Kickstarter campaign to fund a record with Brian McTernan (Circa Survive, Senses Fail, Thrice). They met their goal and began recording in the winter of 2012. The band went on to play "The Road To Unsilent Night 2012" supporting Lions Lions and Carousel Kings. The band's single "Leaving Here" was released via iTunes on March 5, 2013. This song was produced by Brian McTernan of Salad Days Studio in Baltimore, Maryland. The band provided support to Chunk! No, Captain Chunk! on the “Pardon My French” tour (March–April 2013) with other support from For All Those Sleeping and Upon This Dawning. Due to Chunk! No, Captain Chunk! being added to the A Day To Remember tour; Veara, Handguns and State Champs were added to revised dates. City Lights provided direct support to Beartooth on the "Best Friends 4 Lyfe Tour" (August 2013) throughout northern North America and a solo Canadian date. Throughout August 2013, the band also played sporadic shows throughout the northeast. City Lights provided support to A Loss For Words and Hand Guns on their co-headlining "The Lost Boys Tour" (October - November 2013) with additional support from Major League, Stickup Kid, The Sheds, and Light Years. On October 17, 2013, the band announced that they will be releasing their second record entitled The Way Things Should Be on December 10, 2013, through InVogue. The first single and pre-orders were scheduled to be launched officially on October 31, 2013; however iTunes released their pre-order with instant download of the single "Promises" on October 29, 2013. On October 30, 2013, on the band released a lyric video for "Promises" via YouTube. On November 5, 2013, Third Eye Guitars announced their endorsement of City Lights; and on November 10, 2013, the band announced that their cd release show for The Way Things Should Be would take place on December 10, 2013, at Skully's Music Diner in Columbus, Ohio with support from Dear Christie, Push Ahead, Here Comes Quincy (formerly Goodnight, You), Everyone Leaves, Carev Dvor, and Movehome. On November 12, 2013, the band released their second single entitled "Jeremy's Song," featuring Matty Arsenault of A Loss For Words. On November 20, 2013, the band announced their scheduled date to begin filming a music video for an undisclosed track on November 27, 2013, at Skate Naked in Columbus, Ohio. On November 27, 2013, the band released the newest single track entitled "Truth Is" via YouTube. The band streamed The Way Things Should Be via YouTube at midnight on December 5, 2013. On December 5, 2013, the band released The Way Things Should Be live stream; and on December 8, 2013, the band released the music video for "See You At The Top," both via YouTube. On December 9, 2013, the band released The Way Things Should Be to all Kickstarter campaign supporters; and was featured on Idobi Radio's online takeover, streaming the new album at 6 p.m. EST on Idobi.com. The Way Things Should Be was released on December 10, 2013, as scheduled. On December 19, 2013 The Way Things Should Be reached #23 on the Billboard Heatseekers chart. City Lights closed out the year by playing "Snowed In 2013" with Real Friends, Light Years, and Citizen. According to Beartooth's Facebook page, Kamron Bradbury was named an official member in January 2014 and is no longer a part of City Lights.

=== Tour activity, break-up, and acoustic EP (2014–2015) ===
City Lights opened up the year headlining a tour (January 10–19, 2014) with support from So Many Ways; which included a January 15, 2014 show including Violent Kind, Northbound, Vice On Victory, and We As Thieves at The Thompson House in Newport, Kentucky. The band was scheduled to partake in an untitled festival (March 29–30, 2014) at the 89 North Music Venue in Patchogue, New York, providing support to Stick To Your Guns and Terror; as well as provide support to A Loss For Words on "The Kids Can't Lose 5th Anniversary Tour" (March 28 - April 8, 2014) with additional support from Veara, PVRIS, and The Moms. On February 13, 2014, the band announced that they would be breaking up. The official statement by the band as posted on their official website: "We are going to keep this short and sweet. We have decided to call it quits because we’ve all come to a time in our lives when we’re ready to take on new opportunities. For some of us, that involves continuing to play music, and for others it involves working behind the scenes in the industry. We firmly believe that we can contribute to not only our own musical growth, but to the growth of our music scene in general by taking on these new opportunities, and continuing without City Lights. We are thankful for everyone who has helped our band in any way, and we wouldn’t trade the last 6 years for anything. It was an amazing ride, and we really did have the time of our lives. Assuming our schedules allow it, we will be planning and announcing some final shows at a later date.". On January 19, 2015, vocalist Oshie Bichar announced via Twitter that he would be releasing a new acoustic EP under the band's name featuring tracks from their 2013 second album The Way Things Should Be. On February 13, 2015, Acoustic EP 2 was released. The band returned as a group on April 18 to perform a headlining set at the "Ace of Cups" venue in their hometown of Columbus, Ohio. On 1 June, the band's social media lit up with new artwork and a brand new single titled "Not Scared". Fans were quick to jump on the idea of a revival, however the band stated upon the release of the new track that they were still not getting back together. The band later released a new line of merchandise to follow the release of the new single.

== Members ==
Final Lineup

- Oshie Bichar – lead vocals (2008–2014, 2015)
- Sean Smith – drums, percussion (2008–2014, 2015)
- Chase Clymer – bass (2009–2014, 2015)
- Jeremy Smith – lead guitar, backing vocals (2010–2014, 2015)
- Will Deely – rhythm guitar, backing vocals (2013–2014, 2015)

Past Members

- Joey Kasouf – rhythm guitar (2008–2011)
- Zachary LeCompte-Goble – bass, backing vocals (2008–2009)
- Hartley Lewis – lead guitar (2008–2009)
- Jack Snyder – lead guitar (2009–2010)
- Kamron Bradbury – rhythm guitar (2011–2013)

Timeline

== Discography ==
Studio albums

Year	Album	Label	Chart peaks		
Year	Album	Label	Alternative New Artist	Top New Artist	Billboard Heatseekers
2011	In It to Win It	InVogue Records	29	117	-
2013	The Way Things Should Be	InVogue Records	-	-	23

EPs

- Rock Like a Party Star (self-released, 2009)
- Acoustic EP (InVogue, 2012)
- Acoustic EP 2 (InVogue, 2015)
- City Lights (self-released, 2016)

Singles

- "Where You've Been" (2011)
- "Trophy Room" (2012)
- "Leaving Here" (2013)
- "Promises" (2013)
- "Jeremy's Song" (featuring Matty Arsenault of A Loss for Words) (2013)
- "Truth Is" (2013)
- "See You at the Top" (2013)
- "Not Scared" (2015)
- "I'll Never Let You Go" (Third Eye Blind Cover) (Rockin' Romance 2)

== Music videos ==
Year	Song	Director
2009	"Night on the Town"	-
2011	"Where You've Been"	Duncan Johnson
2012	"Trophy Room"	Brandon Cawood
2012	"What It Takes"	Chase Clymer
2013	"See You at the Top"	Gnasty
2013	"Promises" (Lyric Video)	Nathan Kempf

== After City Lights ==
Oshie Bichar and Kamron Bradbury would go on to play in Beartooth.

Zachary LeCompte-Goble would go on to co-found Ghost Town in 2012. He has been the manager or agent for Dayseeker, Jamie's Elsewhere, and Lower Definition.

Jeremy Smith would go on to play in Like Moths to Flames.
