= Famous Last Words (band) =

American metalcore band

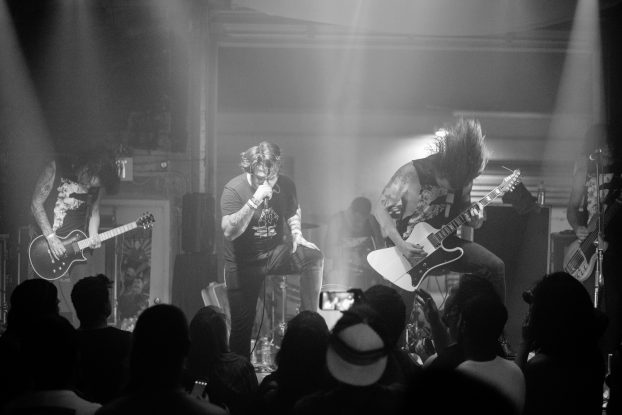

Background information
- Origin: Petoskey, Michigan, United States
- Genres: Metalcore; post-hardcore; symphonic metal; electronicore (early)
- Years active: 2008–present
- Labels: InVogue; Revival; SBG
- Members: Jeremy "JT" Tollas; Tyler Myklebust; Evan Foley; Cody Paige
- Past members: Jesse Maddy; Ethan Osborn; Craig Simons; Matthew Bell; Aaron Peano
- Website: Famous Last Words on Facebook

Famous Last Words (formerly known as A Walking Memory and Barlait) is an American metalcore band from Petoskey, Michigan. Formed in 2008, they are known for their concept albums and have released three studio albums to date: Two-Faced Charade, Council of the Dead and The Incubus. Following their 2016 release, "The Incubus," the group departed from Revival Recordings and signed to SBG Records.

The group currently consists of vocalist Jeremy "JT" Tollas, bassist Tyler Myklebust, guitarist Evan Foley, and drummer Cody Paige.

== History ==
=== 2008-2012: Barlait, A Walking Memory, and early EPs ===
Hailing from Petoskey, Michigan, Famous Last Words (originally called Barlait) was formed in 2008 by members JT Tollas, Aaron Peano, Matthew Bell, and Craig Simons. The group released an EP called A Walking Memory.

Renaming themselves A Walking Memory, the group quickly began to make their mark within the scene. Utilizing heavy guitar riffs, catchy hooks, folly, and symphonic elements, the band introduced detailed stories into their lyrics and album structure; transforming their band into more of an art project. They released the EP You Could Have Made This Easier in 2010. This appeared in self-initiative. After the final name change to Famous Last Words, this was followed by the EP's "In Your Face" in 2010, and Pick Your Poison in 2012; the latter of which came after the band signed to independent label InVogue Records.

Aaron Peano would leave the band after the release of "In Your Face" in 2010, and went on to start his own band, named The Monsters I've Met. In December 2011, Famous Last Words toured Canada with direct support from Dancing With Paris and Her Majesty The King, who joined on select dates. During the tour, Famous Last Words also announced their signing to InVogue Records. On December 14, the band released their debut music video for "Starting Over".

=== 2013: Two-Faced Charade ===
Their first studio album, Two Faced Charade, released April 30, 2013.

This is the first of their concept albums, a story about a schizophrenic outcast who falls in love with his neighbor, Elise (Welcome To The Show). Situations escalate, and he ends up following her into town (Victim of the Virtuoso), and finding out she has a boyfriend (The Relentless). He grows enraged, and starts to hear a screaming internally, one very similar to the one he feels inside. This scream is soon followed by a voice, the form that his previously mentioned schizophrenia takes (Voices). It starts telling him the actions he must take to have Elise as his (Lust of the Lost). He eventually makes a plan, when the boyfriend is about to go on a business trip, the main character stops him outside and acts concerned, since it seems as if the boyfriend was heavily drunk. He brings the boyfriend inside, and proceeds to murder the boyfriend (Legends and Legacies), and then hesitantly cut up the body, and then bury it into the ground (To Play Hide and Seek With Jealousy). Afterwards, he uses the boyfriend's phone to text Elise, in the perspective of the boyfriend telling her that they're done for, and that the stress of this job that the boyfriend took was too much. Elise gets heavily upset and the next day, when the main character goes over to her house to act like he was just coming to have breakfast, she rejects him kindly, explaining how they got broken up over text. The main character tells her everything is okay, and eventually that he took care of the boyfriend (Searching for a Home). She is confused when he says this, and once the main character realizes this, he runs back to his house, with Elise on his tail. She walks into the house, and into his bedroom, where the main character is (Even A Ghost Has A Sanctuary). She sees the bloodied knife and turns to the door, smelling the stench of blood and bleach. She walks into the bathroom and sees the blood, and the main character reassures her that he took care of her boyfriend, and that it's all okay. After she calls him a monster, he grows angry and yells at her that he did this all of her and himself, before she says he did it all for him. He smashes her head into the wall vigorously, before realizing what he's doing and stopping himself. Realizing he just accidentally killed Elise, he turns to the mirror and tells the "inner-demon" that he had messed up his life, before the main character cuts himself down the wrist, killing himself. (The Show Must Go On, Part. 1 and 2).

There's a short film and a short story both written by drummer Craig Simons. JT Tollas directed the short film, and starred in it.

=== 2014-2015: Council of the Dead ===
The band premiered the single "Council of the Dead" on January 27, 2014, and announced their second studio album, Council of the Dead, on the same day. On May 6, 2014, the band announced "The Hope Revolution Tour" beginning late August through September with fellow acts Hawthorne Heights, The Red Jumpsuit Apparatus and New Empire in the US.

The album was released on August 26, 2014 through InVogue Records. It reached #91 on the Top 200 and #18 on Independent Albums on Billboard's charts. On October 10, the band announced "The InVogue Records Tour" beginning late November through December with fellow acts For All I Am, Kingdom of Giants and Whether, I.

On August 1, 2014, the band released the music video for two new tracks, "One In The Chamber" and "The End Of The Beginning", from their upcoming album Council of the Dead. Famous Last Words have revealed the artwork and track listing for their upcoming sophomore studio album, Council of the Dead was released on InVogue on August 26, 2014 nationwide. On February 19, 2015 the band announced "The Touring Dead" beginning late February through March with fellow acts For All I Am and Tear Out the Heart

=== 2016-2018: Revival Recordings and The Incubus ===
On January 5, 2016, it was revealed by Revival Recordings that they had signed Famous Last Words, and that the band was working on their third studio album. The first single, "Pretty In Porcelain," as well as an acoustic rendition of "I'll Be Home Soon", from the label's upcoming compilation was released on iTunes, along with a promotional lyric video.

On June 10, 2016, the band announced "The Method to the Madness Tour" beginning late July with fellow acts Outline in Color, It Lives, It Breathes and Open Your Eyes in the US. On July 9, 2016 the first single, "Pretty In Porcelain", from their upcoming album was released on iTunes, along with a promotional music video.

On September 30, 2016, the group released their third album, "The Incubus", marking their only release on Revival Recordings before departing in December 2017. The subsequent "Incubus Tour" began in late November 2016 with acts The Funeral Portrait and Versus Me.

On June 13, 2017, founding member and drummer Craig Simons announced his amicable departure from the band, citing personal issues.

On October 26, 2018, the band released the first track "No Walls" off their new EP titled "Arizona".

=== 2019-present: Arizona and The Negative ===
On May 16, 2019, the group released the extended play Arizona under SBG records, marking their first release under the label and their first non-concept effort. Commenting on the EP, Tollas stated:

"Arizona is the result of us, as a band, living through and emerging from a really dark place. At the end of 2017, we weren’t sure what the future of Famous Last Words looked like. Or if there even was a future. We decided to channel all of that emotion and anger into the music you hear on this EP. The decision to abandon the concept format for this project was no accident. We had pain, anger, and emotion that we wanted our fans to understand were not anchored around a fictional character. These songs tell the stories of the things we were dealing with."

On December 9, 2020, Tollas tweeted that he had finished "tracking the last bit of new FLW tracks" and that new music is coming soon.

Almost a full year later, on October 29, 2021, Famous Last Words finally released their new single "In The Blink Of An Eye", shocking many fans who had initially thought the band had disbanded. A little longer than a month after this, the band released their three track concept EP titled "The Negative", even though the band claimed to have departed from the concept theme. The EP, though only being three tracks long, (2 songs, and a four minute voice recording) tells the story of a photographer who sees “moments of truths” captured by his camera. He feels his purpose is to capture what he calls "moments of truth" which are completely unfiltered, unedited, natural moments. He wants to capture these moments and preserve them so people can remember what "real life" looks like among the plethora of inauthenticity. When developing one day he sees a vision of a parallel universe colliding with our universe in one of his photo negatives. He doesn’t know when or what is going to happen exactly once it collides, but he knows it’s going to be soon and he begins to wildly speculate on all of the horrifying possibilities. He carries this knowledge on his own out of fear of the world thinking he has gone mad.

Physical copies of the EP were limited to 300 copies, sold exclusively in their bundle titled The Anthology, including three CDs. The first CD is their second EP, "Pick Your Poison", and "The Negative", the second is their debut album "Two-Faced Charade", and the third is their sophomore album "Council of the Dead". Alongside the CD bundle, The Anthology included a flag, a poster, a "The Negative" t-shirt, and a single polaroid picture of one of the band members.

In August 2022, Famous Last Words embarked on their first tour in 3 years with support from Across The White Water Tower and Dark Divine.

== Band members ==
Current

- Jeremy "JT" Tollas – lead vocals (2008–present)
- Evan Foley - guitars, backing vocals (2014–Present)
- Tyler Myklebust – bass (2018–present), rhythm guitar (2011–2018)
- Cody Paige — drums (2017–present)

Former

- Jesse Maddy – bass (2011–2013)
- Ethan Osborn – lead guitar, backing vocals (2010-2014), bass (2010-2012)
- Craig Simons – drums, backing vocals (2010–2017; died 2024)
- Matthew Bell – bass, backing vocals (2010–2011, 2013-2018)
- Aaron Peano – guitar, backing vocals (2008-2010)

== Discography ==
=== Studio albums ===
- Two-Faced Charade (2013)
- Council of the Dead (2014)
- The Incubus (2016)

=== Extended plays ===
- A Walking Memory (as Barlait) (2008)
- You Could Have Made This Easier (as A Walking Memory) (2010)
- In Your Face (2010)
- Pick Your Poison (2012)
- Arizona (2019)
- The Negative (2021)

=== Singles ===
Year	Song	Album
2012	"Starting Over"	Pick Your Poison
2013	"The Show Must Go On"	Two-Faced Charade
2013	"Lust of the Lost"	Two-Faced Charade
2013	"To Play Hide And Seek With Jealousy"	Two-Faced Charade
2014	"Council of the Dead"	Council of the Dead
2014	"One In The Chamber"	Council of the Dead
2014	"The End of the Beginning"	Council of the Dead
2014	"The Uprise"	Council of the Dead
2016	"Pretty In Porcelain"	The Incubus
2016	"The Judged"	The Incubus
2018	"No Walls"	Arizona
2021	"In The Blink Of An Eye"	The Negative
2025	"The Show Must Go On Prt. 3"	Non-album single

=== Music videos ===
Year	Song	Director
2012	"Starting Over"	Charlie Anderson
2013	"The Show Must Go On"	Charlie Anderson
2014	"One in the Chamber / The End of the Beginning"	Charlie Anderson
2016	"Pretty In Porcelain"	Charlie Anderson
2021	"In The Blink Of An Eye"	Charlie Anderson
2021	"The Negative"	Charlie Anderson

=== Short films ===
Title	Year	Director
A Two-Faced Charade (The Story Revealed)	2015	Charlie Anderson
