= Gone Are the Good Days =

Studio album by Chunk! No, Captain Chunk!
- Released: July 30, 2021
- Recorded: 2016, 2020–2021
- Genre: Easycore; pop-punk
- Label: Fearless
- Producer: Bertrand Poncet

Chunk! No, Captain Chunk! chronology
Get Lost, Find Yourself (2015)	Gone Are the Good Days (2021)

Singles from Gone Are the Good days
- 1. "Blame It on This Song" Released: August 12, 2016; 2. "Bitter" Released: May 14, 2021; 3. "Gone Are the Good Days" Released: June 11, 2021

Gone Are the Good Days is the fourth studio album by French pop punk band Chunk! No, Captain Chunk! It was released on July 30, 2021, being their first album in six years, since Get Lost, Find Yourself (2015).

== Background and recording ==
In 2016, the band had entered a hiatus after the release of their third studio album, Get Lost, Find Yourself the year prior. While the band would later end their hiatus in late 2019, the COVID-19 pandemic later brought many complications and eventually delayed the touring, much to the frustration of the band. However, despite this, frontman Bert Poncet announced in October 2020 that the band would still be pushing forward with new material.

The track "Blame It on This Song" had actually been recorded and release in 2016, as a farewell song just prior to their hiatus.

== Themes and composition ==
The album has generally been described as pop punk, specifically the title track. The track "Bitter" was described as "easycore". While some songs delve into heavier territory, with screamed vocals and hardcore punk breakdowns, other tracks include softer elements, such as acoustic guitar and indie rock elements. It was noted that despite stylistic differences, most song built up to a easycore, melodic chorus. Despite the band's frustrations with the COVID-19 pandemic during the recording sessions, the track was actually about positive thoughts, reminiscing about the good times they had touring in the past. The album on a whole was written with a more nostalgic and reflective tone, meaning to bring about a sense of maturity without being too serious. Poncet noted that the writing of an upbeat, nostalgic album during the pandemic helped them feel more hopeful for the future.

== Release and promotion ==
Multiple songs were released ahead of the album's release, including "Blame It on This Song", which had been released back in 2016 prior to their hiatus, "Bitter" in May 2021, and "Gone Are the Good Days" in June 2021.

== Reception ==
Kerrang praised the album for maintaining the band's established pop punk and easycore sound with a little experimentation, but lamented that "at a point when pop punk is broadening its sound and appeal to incorporate more artists and genres, the range on the albums falls a little short, but that's not to say its not an enjoyable, energizing listen."

== Track listing ==
All tracks are written by Chunk! No, Captain Chunk!.

No.	Title	Length
1.	"Bitter"	3:11
2.	"Drift Away"	3:38
3.	"Gone Are the Good Days"	3:45
4.	"Marigold"	4:21
5.	"Made For More"	3:58
6.	"True Colors"	3:12
7.	"Good Luck"	2:24
8.	"Complete You"	4:17
9.	"Blame It on This Song"	3:31
10.	"Painkillers"	3:49
11.	"Tongue Tied"	3:52
12.	"Fin."	4:30
Total length:		44:27

== Personnel ==
Chunk! No, Captain Chunk!

- Bert Poncet – vocals, production, mixing, engineering
- Éric Poncet – guitar
- Paul Cordebard – guitar, art direction
- Mathias Rigal – bass guitar
- Bastien Lafaye – drums, engineering

Additional contributors

- Alan Douches – mastering
- Johanne Chauland – engineering assistance
- Hugo Lee – saxophone
- AJ Perdomo – vocals on "Complete You"
- Yvette Young – violin and vocals on "Tongue Tied"
- Trey Trimble – design
