= Tear Out the Heart =

American metalcore band

Tear Out The Heart
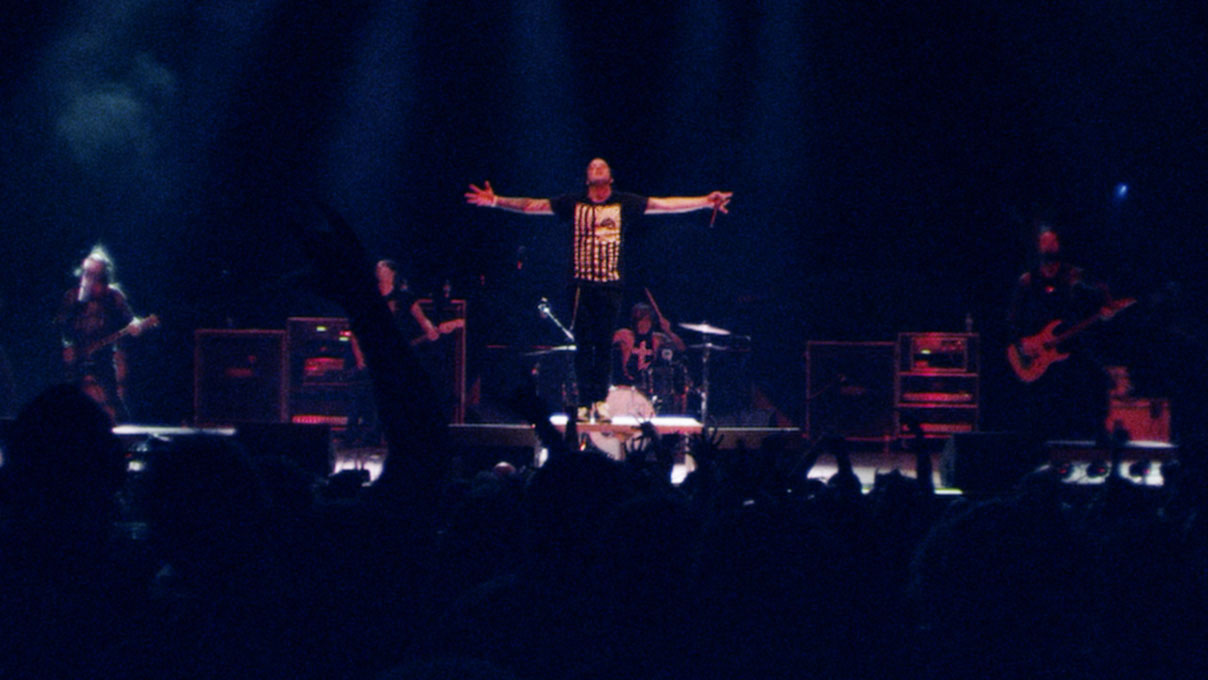

Background information
- Origin: St. Louis, Missouri, U.S.
- Genres: Metalcore, post-hardcore, melodic metalcore (early)
- Years active: 2011–2019
- Label: Victory
- Members: Alex Wilkinson; Josh Spohr

Tear Out The Heart was a five-piece metalcore band from St. Louis, Missouri, founded in 2011. The band signed with Victory Records in 2012. and released their first full-length record, Violence, in 2013. They released their second full-length album, Dead, Everywhere, on January 27, 2015.

== History ==
Tear Out The Heart self-released their first EP Tear Out The Heart in 2011, and their second EP Hell Is Empty in July 2012, just a month before announcing they had signed to Victory Records. Their debut album Violence was released on Victory Records in March 2013 and was received with predominantly positive reviews. Violence featured guest vocals from Caleb Shomo from Attack Attack! on the track "Undead Anthem", and Dan Marsala of Story Of The Year on the track "Coffin Eyes". Dory Khawand of Metal Temple, whom gave the album 8/10, stated:

Well, the album is pretty unique in terms of atmosphere and overall delivery. What’s found here is some heart melting guitar drops, synthesizers, and the refreshing voice of Caleb Shomo (whom somehow tends to be featured on tons of Metalcore albums for some reason nowadays).

Throughout their career, Tear Out The Heart have played with artists such as Palisades, Famous Last Words, The Browning. In late 2013 the band announced that they would be on Warped Tour. However, before the start of the tour, they made a post on their official Facebook page stating that

Due to an extensive recording process, we regret to inform you all that we will no longer be a part of the Van's Warped Tour this summer. We're genuinely sorry to any of you that were planning on seeing us perform but this new album is far more important to us than anything.

On September 27, 2014 Tear Out The Heart played Rob Zombie's "The Great American Nightmare" with The Devil Wears Prada.

In March 2014 Tear Out The Heart announced on their Facebook Page that they were in the studio to begin recording a new album. On December 8, 2014, after a week of hinting at a large announcement via their Facebook page, the band premiered the video for their new song "Feel Real" on Revolver, along with pre-orders and the track listing for their upcoming album Dead, Everywhere, which is set to be released on January 27, 2015 This was followed by the release of parts one and two of track-by-track videos giving in depth descriptions of the song meanings from the upcoming album. Part one premiered exclusively with Alternative Press on December 16, and part two premiered exclusively with Revolver on January 12.

In February 2015, they announced that they will be co-headlining a tour with Famous Last Words and For All I Am from March 13 till April 4, 2015.

In October 2015, Etter & Murphy left the band due to "creative differences". TOTH is currently hard at work, writing their follow up to the Dead, Everywhere (2015).

== Band members ==
Final Lineup

- Tyler Kasch - Unclean Vocals
- Josh Spohr - Guitar
- Alex Wilkinson - Guitar
- Kyle Weinmann - Bass, Clean Vocals

Former Members

- Matt Epstein - Drums, Percussion
- Isaac Etter - Bass, Clean Vocals
- Matt Murphy - Guitars

== Discography ==
Tear Out The Heart discography
- Studio albums: 2
- EPs: 2
- Singles: 3
- Music videos: 6

=== Studio albums ===
- Violence (2013)
- Dead, Everywhere (2015)

=== EPs ===
- Tear Out the Heart (2011)
- Hell Is Empty (2012)

=== Singles ===
- "Game Changer (Houdini's Coffin)" (2012)
- "Infamous Last Words" (2013)
- "Undead Anthem" (2013)

=== Music videos ===
- "Undead Anthem" Lyric Video (ft. Caleb Shomo)
- "Infamous Last Words"
- "Coffin Eyes" (ft. Dan Marsala)
- "Dead By Dawn"
- "Feel Real"
- "I've Got Secrets"
- "The Rejected"
