= In Her Own Words =

American rock band

- Genres: Post-hardcore; pop punk; emo
- Years active: 2007–present
- Labels: Thriller; InVogue
- Members: Joey Fleming; Andretti Almalel
- Past members: Laxon Sumawiganda; Bryce Beckley; Ian Berg; Eric Ruelas; Omar Sultani
- Website: inherownwords.bandcamp.com

In Her Own Words is an American rock band from Los Angeles, California.

== History ==
In Her Own Words released their first EP in 2011 titled Brand New Me. In 2013, the band released their first full-length album on Ice Grill$ titled Everything I Used To Trust. In 2016, In Her Own Words signed to InVogue Records and released their second full-length album titled Unfamiliar. Currently, In Her Own Words is signed to Thriller Records and have released their third full-length studio album Distance Or Decay.

== Band members ==
- Joey Fleming (vocals)
- Andretti Almalel (guitar)

== Discography ==
Studio albums

- Unfamiliar (2016, InVogue)
- Steady Glow (2019, InVogue)
- Distance Or Decay (2022, Thriller)

EPs

- Brand New Me (2010)
- Everything I Used To Trust (2013)
- Bad Weather (2015)
- Left In The Dark (2024, Thriller)

Singles

- East & West (2014)
- Strangers (2014)
- Bad Weather (2015)
- Leaving Forever (2021)
- Lights Out (2022)
- Raining In Toronto (featuring Jonathan Vigil) (2022)
- Circles (featuring Derek Discanio) (2022)
- Daydream (2022)
- Beg For More (2024, Thriller)
- Story Of Us (2024, Thriller)
- House Party (2024, Thriller)
- I Think It's Time (2024, Thriller)
- 96 Hours (2024, Thriller)
- Sugarcoat (2025, Thriller)

Compilation Appearances

- Happy Holidays, I Miss You - Yule Shoot Your Eye Out (Fall Out Boy cover)
