= Teenage Scream =

Studio album by That's Outrageous!
- Released: July 19, 2011
- Genre: Electronicore, Metalcore, Post-hardcore
- Length: 26:45
- Label: Rise
- Producer: Cameron Mizell

That's Outrageous! chronology
Teenage Scream (2011)	Psycho (2012)

Singles from Teenage Scream
- 1. "#Winning" Released: March 24, 2011; 2. "Teenage Scream" Released: May 14, 2011; 3. "Headshot at the Ballet Recital" Released: July 15, 2011

Professional ratings
Review scores
Source	Rating
AllMusic	3.5/5 stars
Under The Gun Review	8/10 stars
Sputnikmusic	2/5 stars

Teenage Scream is the debut full-length studio album by American electronicore band That's Outrageous!. The album was released on July 19, 2011, through Rise Records.

== Track listing ==
No.	Title	Length
1.	"Poughkeepsie Tapes"	1:23
2.	"Headshot at the Ballet Recital"	3:01
3.	"Teenage Scream"	3:21
4.	"#Winning"	2:42
5.	"Star 69"	1:26
6.	"So, I'm Thinking of Starting a Clothing Line..."	3:04
7.	"Is It 2012 Yet?"	2:46
8.	"The New York Chainsaw Massacre" (featuring Austin Carlile)	2:45
9.	"Re: Why I Killed My Girlfriend"	4:02
10.	"What Happens in Azeroth, Stays in Azeroth"	2:15
Total length:		26:45

== Personnel ==
That's Outrageous!

- Doriano Magliano – unclean vocals
- Tom DeGrazia – clean vocals, synthesizers, keyboards
- David Newton – guitar
- Joe Jensen – guitar
- Greg Adams – bass guitar
- Max Wyre – drums

Other Personnel

- Austin Carlile (Of Mice & Men) – additional vocals on "The New York Chainsaw Massacre"

Production

- Cameron Mizell – Producer, Mixing, Mastering, engineer
