= Being as an Ocean =

American post-hardcore band

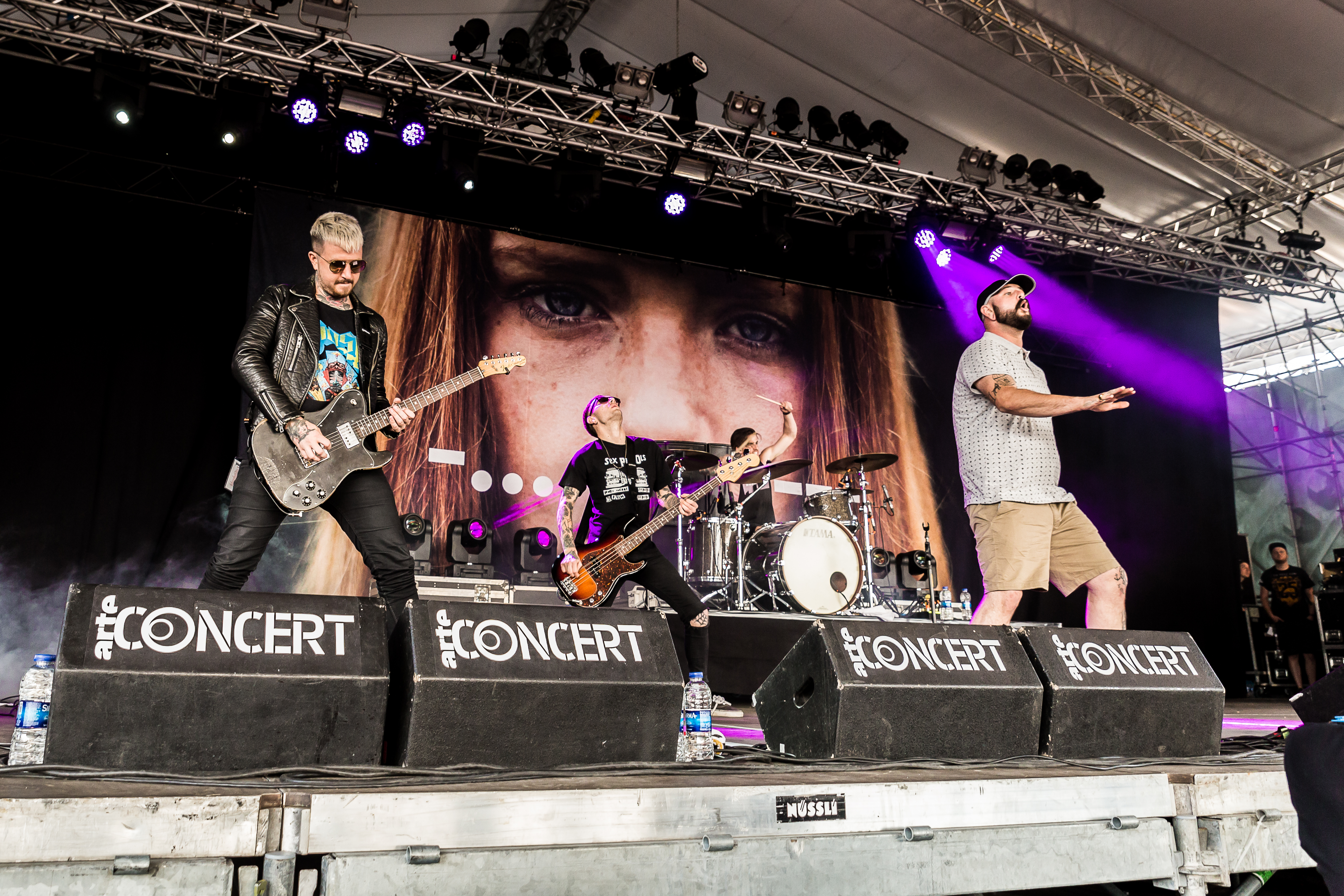
- Being as an Ocean live at With Full Force 2018, Germany

Background information
- Also known as: Vanguard
- Origin: Alpine, California, U.S.
- Genres: Post-hardcore; melodic hardcore; post-rock; spoken word; Christian hardcore (early)
- Years active: 2011–present
- Labels: Tandem Management Co.; SharpTone; Equal Vision; InVogue
- Members: Joel Quartuccio
- Past members: Michael McGough; Tyler Ross; Ralph Sica; Shad Hamawe; Jacob Prest; Connor Denis; Jesse Shelley; Anthony Ghazel; Garrett Harney

Being as an Ocean is an American post-hardcore band from Alpine, California, formed in 2011. They have released six studio albums: Dear G-d..., How We Both Wondrously Perish, a self-titled album, Waiting for Morning to Come, released on 8 September 2017, PROXY: An A.N.I.M.O. Story, released in 2019, and Death Can Wait in 2024. How We Both Wondrously Perish was released in May 2014 and charted at number 57 on the Billboard 200 in the U.S.

== History ==
=== Years as Vanguard and Dear G-d... (2011–2013) ===
Being as an Ocean was originally named Vanguard, where they played extreme metal with a Christian message, however, as their sound was experimented with more, they began to lose interest in playing metal and instead pursued a more post-hardcore sound. Demo versions of the songs "The Hardest Part Is Forgetting Those You Swore You Would Never Forget" and "Humble Servant, Am I" were streamed on Vanguard's MySpace page on January 4, 2011. The band thereafter changed their name to Being as an Ocean.

Guitarist Tyler Ross wrote the whole first album right after the band's formation. Dear G-d... was tracked in an old hotel called The Palms and was sent to Brian Hood to be mixed and mastered. The first single from the album was its title track, which was released on January 3, 2012, and was met with positive acclaim. Shortly after, Jacob Prest joined the band as rhythm guitarist. Being as an Ocean toured over twenty countries including Canada, Germany, Georgia, Austria, the United Kingdom and Australia with support from bands such as Counterparts, Hundredth, Sierra, Liferuiner, Napoleon, and The Elijah. They released a b-side from Dear G-d... titled "The People Who Share My Name" on August 5, 2013.

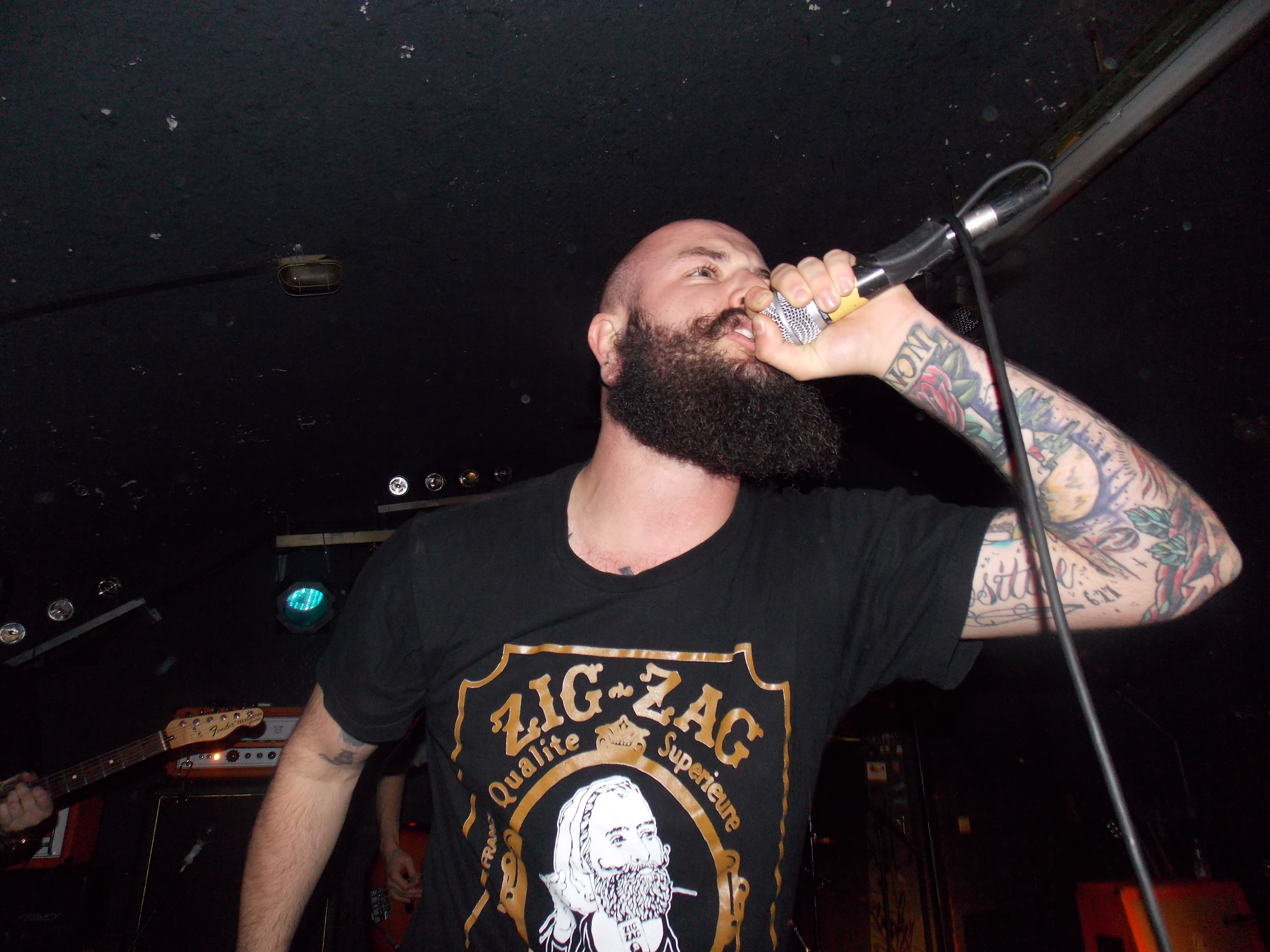
Joel Quartuccio live in Trier, Germany in 2014

=== Line-up changes, How We Both Wondrously Perish and self-titled album (2013–2015) ===
In 2013, Shad Hamawe and Jacob Prest left the band to pursue lives outside of the band due to the intense touring schedule. The remaining members started recording as well as auditioning for new members. Connor Dennis, of the hardcore punk band Sleep Patterns, joined the band as their new drummer. With this new line-up, they began writing and recording for their new album that would be released sometime in 2014. Michael McGough, of the post-hardcore band The Elijah, was also announced as the new guitarist for the band after initially only meaning to provide guest vocals on one song, "L'exquisite Douleur".

On February 25, they revealed the album art of their second album, How We Both Wondrously Perish and announced its release date. A single from the album, "Death's Great Black Wing Scrapes the Air", was released on iTunes. The band recorded the album in Atlanta, Georgia, at Glow in the Dark Studios with Matt McClellan and released it on May 6, 2014.

Shortly after, the band revealed that they were working on a third album that will be released in 2015. They played the entirety of 2015's Warped Tour. On May 7, they released "Little Richie", the first song from the new album and revealed the cover and release date for the album, which will be self-titled. The band released "Sleeping Sicarii", "Forgetting Is Forgiving the I", and "Sins of The Father" as additional singles. Being as an Ocean was released on June 29, 2015.

=== Waiting for Morning to Come and Proxy: An A.N.I.M.O. Story (2015–2021) ===
On October 11, 2015, Tyler Ross revealed on his Twitter account that he was working on a new Being as an Ocean song. In a series of tweets, he confirmed that he was still working on that song, as well as another new song for the band. It has yet to be confirmed if these songs will be part of a fourth album, an EP or be released as stand-alone singles. On November 21, it was revealed that Connor Dennis was parting ways with the band in order to pursue a career as a professional session and touring drummer.

On February 25, the band released "Dissolve" as a stand-alone single, announcing their signing to Equal Vision Records and using Jesse Shelley (Sleepwave live drummer) as their new drummer.

During the last weeks of 2016, Being as an Ocean announced that their fourth studio album Waiting for Morning to Come would be released on June 9, 2017, however, the album did not meet this release date. It was met with an unexpected delay with no explanation given at the time by the band or Equal Vision why the album hadn't been released. On August 14, 2017, Tyler Ross confirmed that he had bought and secured the rights to the album and that the band would be releasing it independently on September 8. The band officially stated on their Facebook account on August 19 that they have become an independent band after buying out their contract with Equal Vision. The band would release two singles from the album in the weeks that followed, the first of these being "Thorns" and the second being "Black and Blue", which had been performed live prior to its release. On July 20, 2018, the band released the single "Alone".

In an interview with Dead Press! on November 4, 2018, whilst touring in London as part of the Impericon Never Say Die! Tour, Michael McGough confirmed that the band had recorded a new album with 11 tracks, and expect to release it early 2019.

On September 13, 2019, Being as an Ocean released their fifth full-length album, PROXY: An A.N.I.M.O. Story independently.

=== Line-up changes and Death Can Wait (2021–present) ===
On October 30, 2021, it was announced that Being as an Ocean had parted ways with founding members Tyler Ross and Ralph Sica. On the same day, the band released a new single, titled "Lost" in conjunction with Out of Line Music.

On October 21, 2022, Being as an Ocean released the Dear G-D... (10 Years Anniversary Tracks), which included an unreleased track "Those Who Share My Name", as well as two acoustic tracks from their album, Dear G-D....

On June 29, 2023, Being as an Ocean announced their Swallowed by the Earth headlining European tour, with support from Of Virtue and Senna, beginning August 25, 2023.

On February 2, 2024, Being as an Ocean released their sixth full-length album, Death Can Wait, on Out of Line Music. During their tour across the UK and Europe supporting Currents in February, Joel Quartuccio was unable to attend whilst dealing with family matters at home. Ithaca vocalist Djamila Azzouz provided guest vocals for that tour.

On September 17, 2024, the band confirmed that they and long-time guitarist/vocalist Michael McGough had mutually decided to part ways, leaving vocalist Joel Quartuccio as the only remaining full-time member. In his statement, Joel confirmed that he intends to continue on with the band, stating "BAAO IS MY BABY AND WILL CONTINUE ON."

== Musical style and influences ==
The band's musical style has been described as post-hardcore melodic hardcore, post-rock, and spoken word. AllMusic writer Gregory Heaney characterised them as a "post-hardcore band with a melodic and plaintive sound punctuated by outbursts of aggression" while Indie Vision Music stated their music blended "melodic hardcore, Explosions in the Sky-esque atmospheric rock, and spoken word "talk music" similar to La Dispute, Listener, or MewithoutYou". Vocalist Joel Quartuccio has been noted for a "passionate vocal delivery" with his "mix of spoken word and traditional pained yelled/screamed vocals paint[ing] passionate tapestries". The addition of Connor Denis and Michael McGough to the line-up marked a transition in their style, while their first album Dear G-d... "showcased a lot of human emotion through its ultra-personal lyricism, How We Both Wondrously Perish unleashed much of its emotion in shining musicality, as the group tightened up their instrumentation and added new dynamics to their sound – the biggest being the addition of guitarist/clean vocalist Michael McGough".

The lyrics for their debut album, referred to as "heartfelt", talk about life experiences, emotions, ideas and conversations Quartuccio "had about G-d, hope, love, humility, strength, pain, depression, loss and Life". Throughout the later albums, these continue to be the principal inspiration for the lyrics. Although they are often considered a Christian band, they denied that, saying that they are "Christian people who love to write music" and would prefer not to be placed under the "Christian band" tag.

Some of the influences to their sound were MewithoutYou, Bradley Hathaway, Touché Amoré, Pianos Become the Teeth, Oceana, Bring Me The Horizon, Listener, Comeback Kid, This Will Destroy You, the Weeknd, Justice, Health, Terror Jr, Twenty One Pilots, Bon Iver, Underoath, the Chariot, Have Heart, Verse, Sigur Rós, La Dispute and Balance and Composure.

== Members ==
Being as an Ocean live at With Full Force 2018, Germany

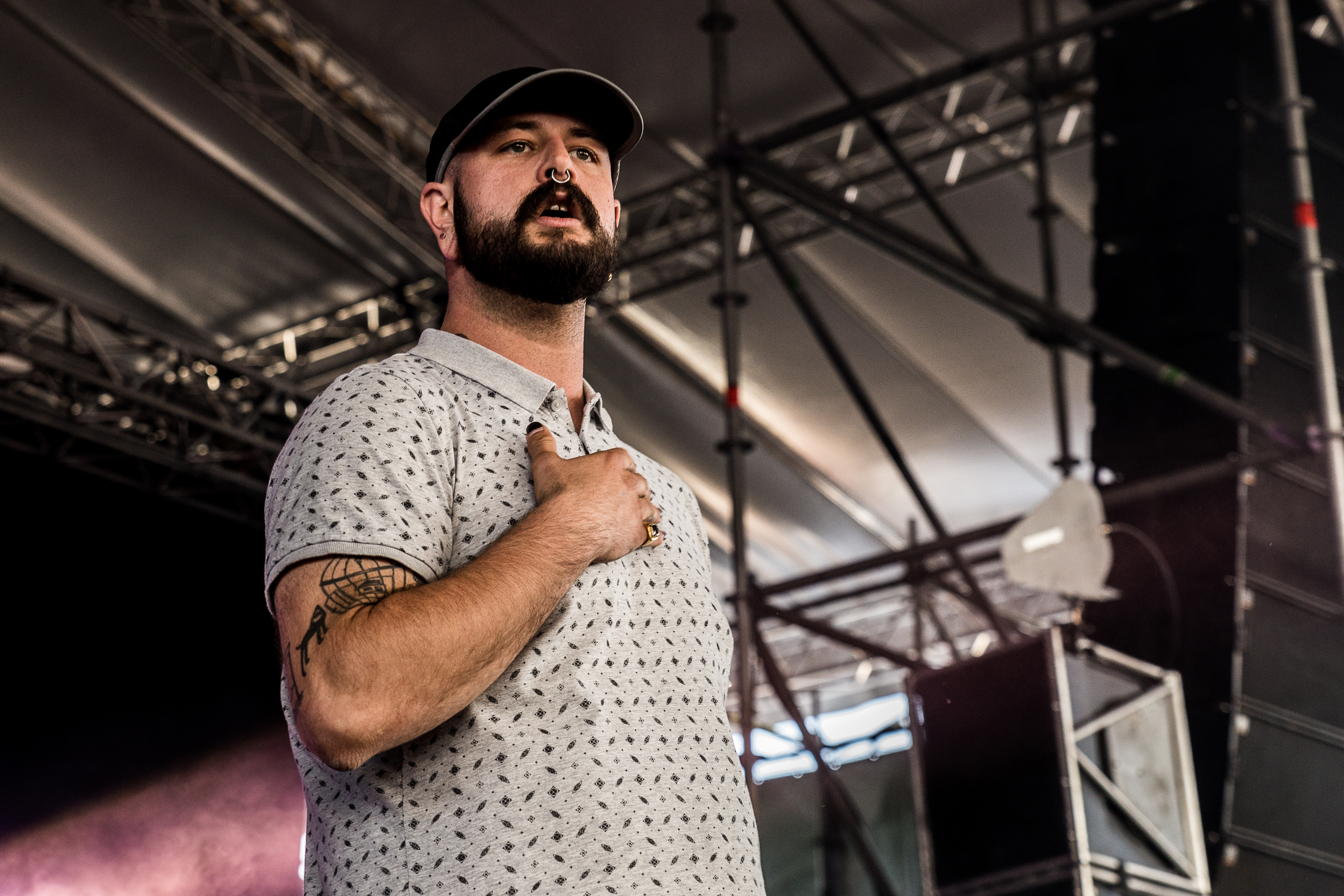
Singer Joel Quartuccio

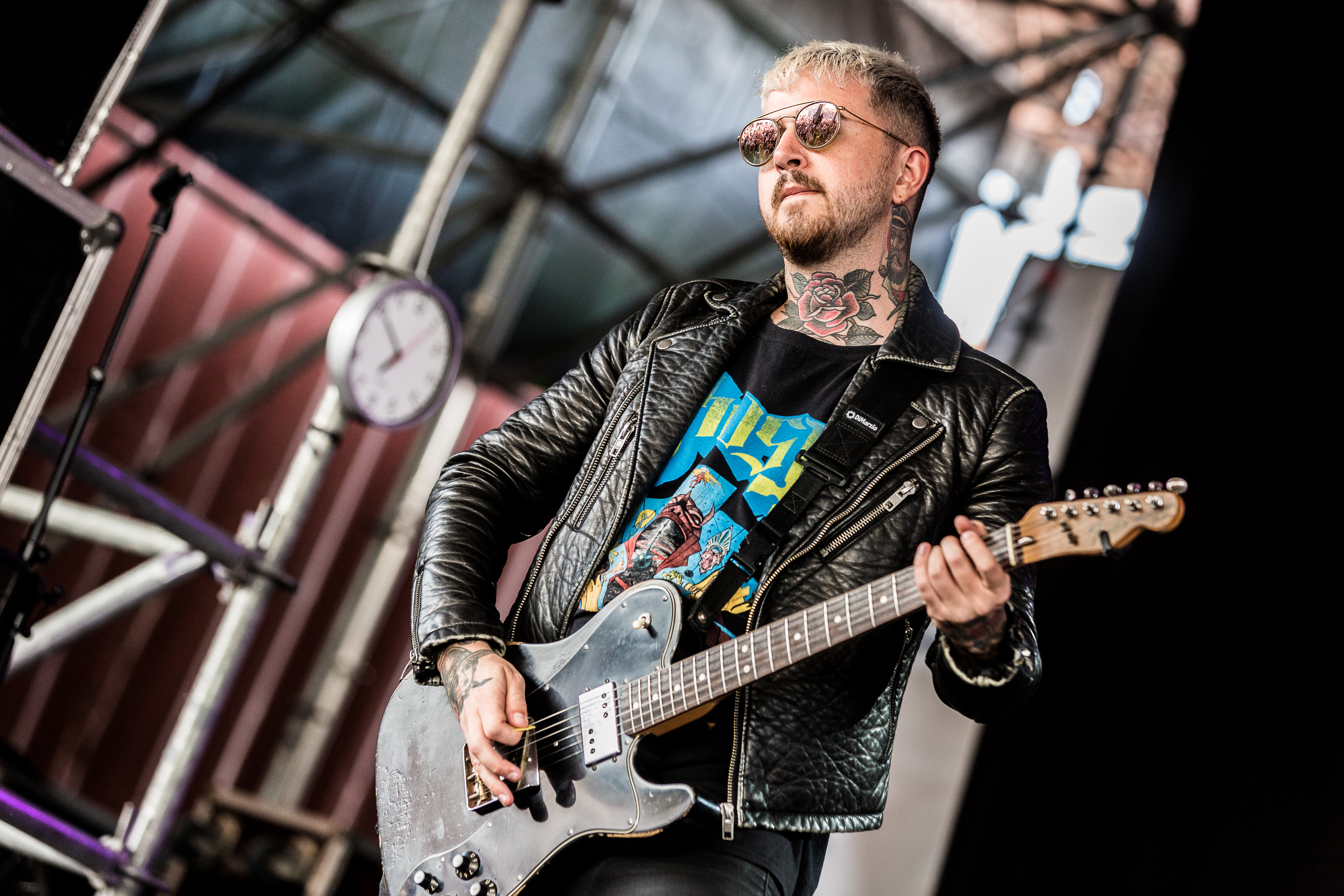
Lead guitarist Tyler Ross

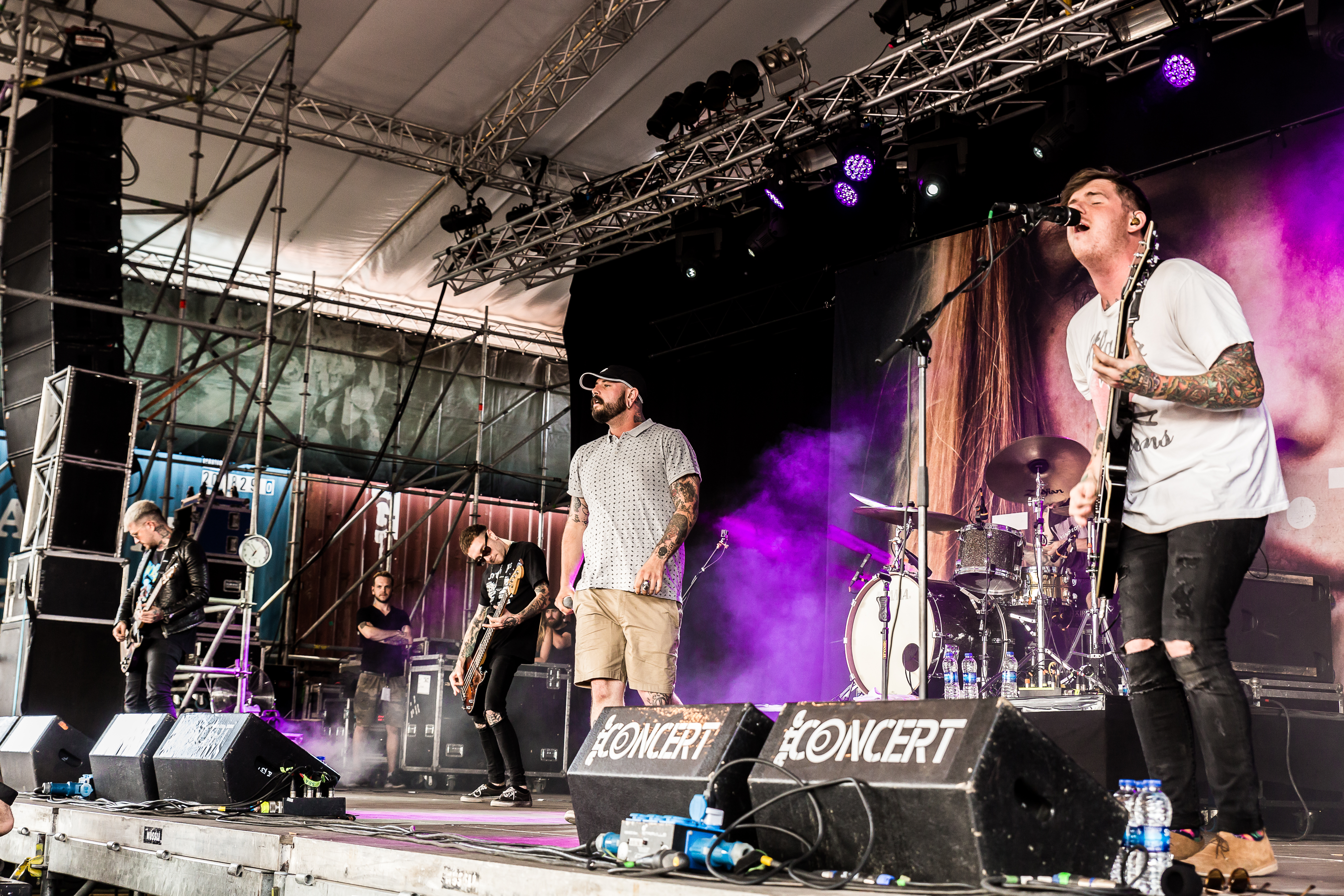
Rhythm guitarist, vocalist Michael McGough (right)

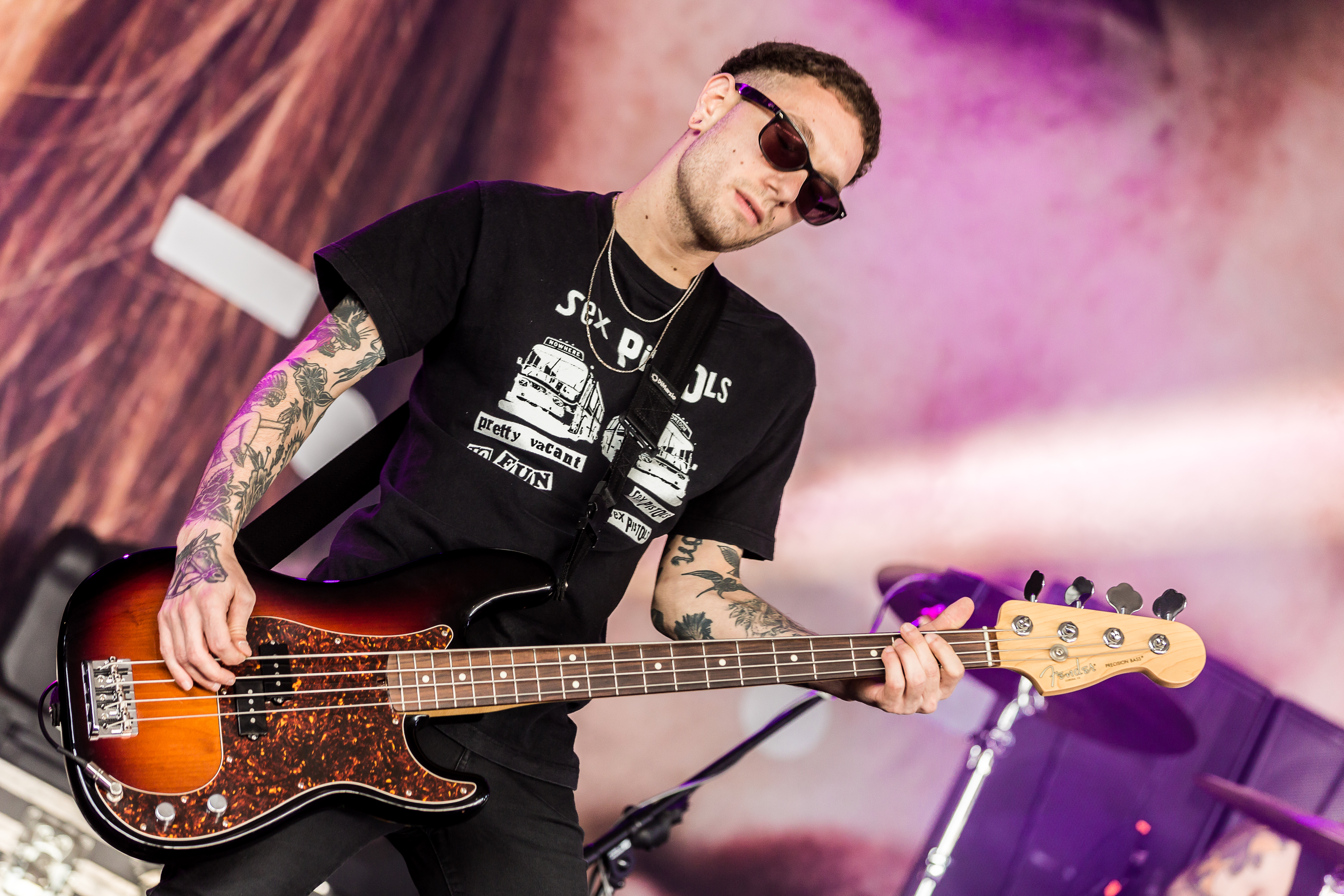
Bassist Ralph Sica

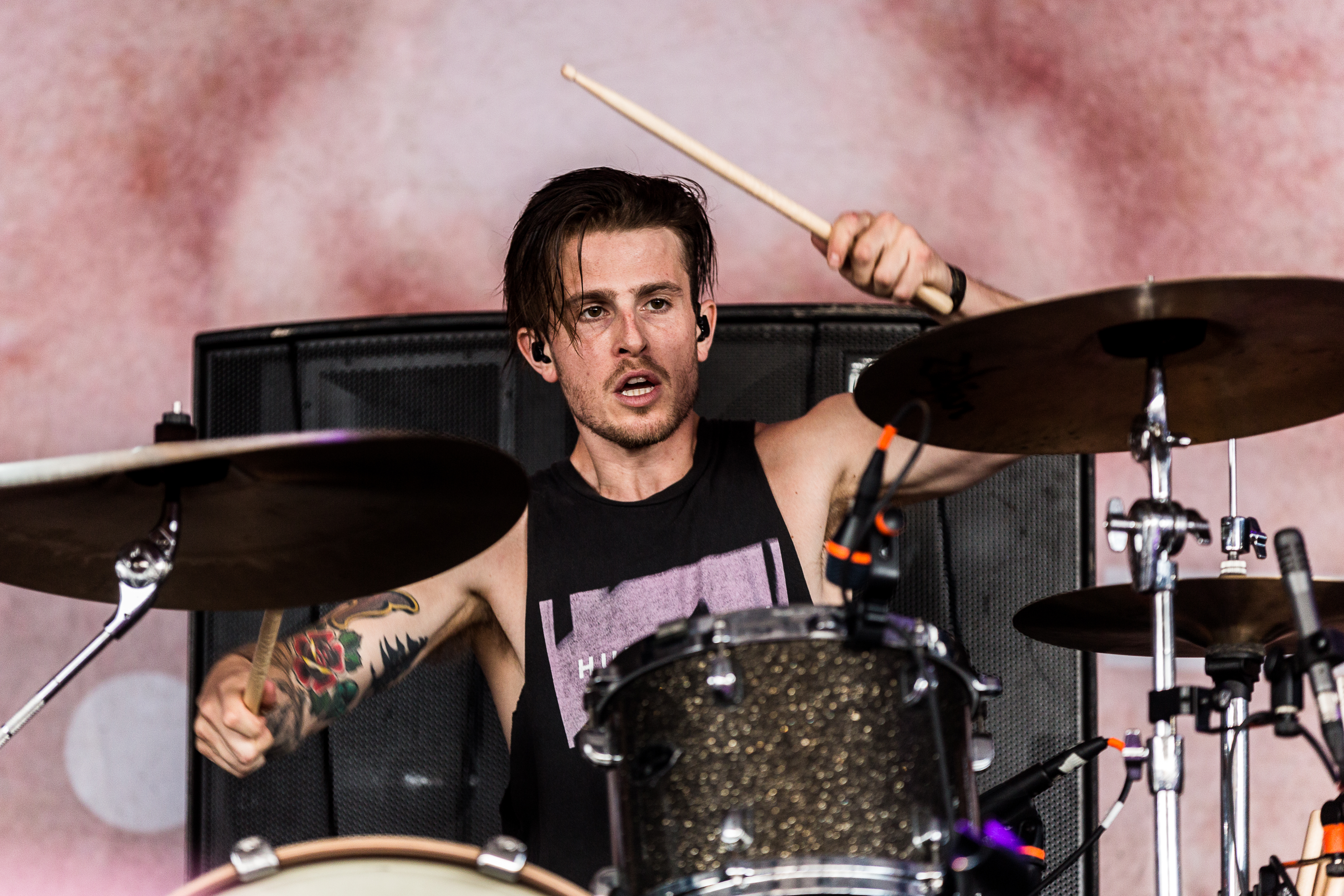
Drummer Anthony Ghazel

Current members

- Joel Quartuccio – lead vocals (2011–present)

Current touring musicians

- David Baqi – guitars (2021–present)

Former members

- Michael McGough – vocals (2013–2024); bass (2021–2024); rhythm guitar (2013–2021)
- Tyler Ross – lead guitar (2011–2021)
- Ralph Sica – bass (2011–2021)
- Shad Hamawe – drums, percussion (2011–2013)
- Jacob Prest – rhythm guitar, vocals (2011–2013)
- Connor Denis – drums, percussion (2013–2015)
- Garrett Harney – drums (2018–2021)

Former touring musicians

- Anthony Ghazel – drums (2017–2018)
- Jesse Shelley – drums (2015–2017, 2021–2022)
- Djamila Azzouz - vocals (2024)

Timeline

== Discography ==
Studio albums

Year	Title	Label	Chart positions					
Year	Title	Label	US 200	US Indie	US Alt.	US Rock	AUS	GER
2012	Dear G-d...	InVogue Records	—	115	—	—	—	—
2014	How We Both Wondrously Perish	InVogue Records	57	9	10	17	—	—
2015	Being as an Ocean	InVogue Records	—	11	17	25	99	56
2017	Waiting for Morning to Come	Independent	—	38	—	46	—	—
2019	Proxy: An A.N.I.M.O. Story	Independent	—	—	—	—	—	—
2024	Death Can Wait	Out of Line Music	—	—	—	—	—	—

Other releases

- "The Hardest Part Is Forgetting Those You Swore You Would Never Forget" and "Humble Servant, Am I" - Dear G-d... demos (2011, self-released)
- "The People Who Share My Name" - Dear G-d... B-side (2013, InVogue Records)

== Music videos ==
- "Dear G-d" (2012, Dear G-d...)
- "The Hardest Part Is Forgetting Those You Swore You Would Never Forget" (2012, Dear G-d...)
- "Salute e Vita" (2013, Dear G-d...)
- "Nothing, Save the Power They're Given" (2013, Dear G-d...)
- "L'exquisite Douleur" (2014, How We Both Wondrously Perish)
- "Mediocre Shakespeare" (2014, How We Both Wondrously Perish)
- "Little Richie" (2015, Being as an Ocean)
- "Death's Great Black Wing Scrapes the Air" (2015, How We Both Wondrously Perish)
- "Dissolve" (2016, Waiting For Morning To Come)
- "This Loneliness Won't Be The Death Of Me" (2017, Dear G-d...)
- "OK" (2018, Waiting For Morning To Come)
- "Alone" (2018, Deluxe Edition of Waiting For Morning To Come)
- "Know My Name" (2018, Deluxe Edition of Waiting For Morning To Come)
- "Play Pretend" (2019, PROXY: An A.N.I.M.O. Story)
- "Lost" (2021, non-album single)
