= For All I Am =

American metalcore band

- Origin: Chicago, Illinois, U.S.
- Genre: Metalcore
- Years active: 2011–present
- Labels: Equal Vision, InVogue
- Members: Aria Yavarinejad; Subu Bhandari; Chad Sutliff; Andrew Salsaberry
- Past members: Clayton Neeley; Mario Roche; Chase Wagster; Aaron Martinez; Tom Crisp; Jesse Marx
- Website: For All I Am on Facebook

For All I Am is an American metalcore band from Chicago, Illinois, originally known as "I, Artificial". The band was formed in 2011. They are currently independent. They released an EP called Lone Wolf in 2011. Their debut album Skinwalker was released in January 2013, followed by No Home in October 2014. For All I Am was named as one of the "100 bands you need to know in 2012" by Alternative Press and has been featured in Rock Sound, Outburn, Hails & Horns, AMP, Substream Music Press magazines and more.

== History ==
After a local show in December 2010 at Rainbow Falls Waterpark in Elk Grove Village, Illinois; vocalist Aria Yavarinejad decided that he was not happy with the way the band was progressing musically and left the band Catastrophe Beneath The Heavens. He formed a new band, I, Artificial, with former bandmates Chase Wagster, Mario Roche, Noah Whitney, and Aaron Martinez.

With a second guitarist, Tom Crisp, on their team, the band changed their name to For All I Am and signed to Equal Vision Records

The band released their first EP, Lone Wolf, on November 1, 2011.

The band went on their first tour, "Take A Picture, It Will Last Longer" on November 22, 2011, with bands We Came As Romans, Sleeping with Sirens, and Attila. Emmure played on select dates.

The band premiered their single, "Swallowed Alive" on October 21, 2013.

On January 22, 2013, the band released the first full-length album under Equal Vision Records. It was recorded with producer Will Putney (Chiodos, For Today, Like Moths to Flames) at the Machine Shop Studios in Belleville, New Jersey. The album title comes from the term "skin-walker", which references a person with the ability to transform into any animal supernaturally.

In 2013, the band parted ways with guitarist Chase Wagster and Jesse Marx filled the role as lead guitarist.

For All I Am embarked on their first heading tour in 2014, "Thawed Out", with bands Cursed Sails, Chasing Safety, Youth In Revolt and Separations.

The band signed to InVogue Records and announced their second full-length recording, "No Home" to be released on October 22, 2014.

In October 2014, the band released a music video for the song "Young Grave".

On June 18, 2017, it was announced on the band's Facebook that Tom Crisp and Aaron Martinez have departed from the band. Aria issued a statement regarding the changes and his continued interest in pursuing the band.

After an almost 3-year hiatus, the band released a new single titled "This Is Not What I Thought" on April 24, 2020. Clayton Neeley joined as their new guitarist.

On January 19, 2023, For All I Am announced the passing of former guitarist, Tom Crisp.

After another 3-year hiatus, the band announced their long-awaited return on August 23, 2023, with their return single "Toxsin" to be released on September 22, 2023. "Reset" was released shortly after on November 2, 2023.

On December 24, 2024, guitarist Clayton Neeley was removed from the band

On March 24, 2025, bassist Mario Roche was removed from the band

Chad Sutliff was announced as their new drummer on February 27, 2026.

Andrew Salsaberry joins as their new guitarist on August 26, 2026.

== Band members ==
Current members

- Aria Yavarinejad – lead vocals, backing vocals (2011–present)
- Subu Bhandari – drums (2020–2026), guitar (2026–present)
- Chad Sutliff – drums (2026–present)

Former members

- Mario Roche – bass (2011–2015, 2019–2025)
- Chase Wagster – guitar (2011–2013 / 2019–2020)
- Aaron Martinez – drums (2011–2017)
- Tom Crisp – lead guitar (2011–2017; died 2023)
- Jesse Marx – lead guitar (2013–2015)
- Clayton Neeley – guitar (2018–2024)

== Discography ==
Studio albums

Year	Album	Label
2013	Skinwalker	Equal Vision
2014	No Home	InVogue

EPs

- Lone Wolf (2011)

Singles

- This Is Not What I Thought (2020)
- Toxsin (2023)
- Reset (2023)
- Mazes (2024)
- World Falls Apart (2025)
- Drowning (2025)
- Bad Intentions (2026)
