= Chunk! No, Captain Chunk! =

French rock band

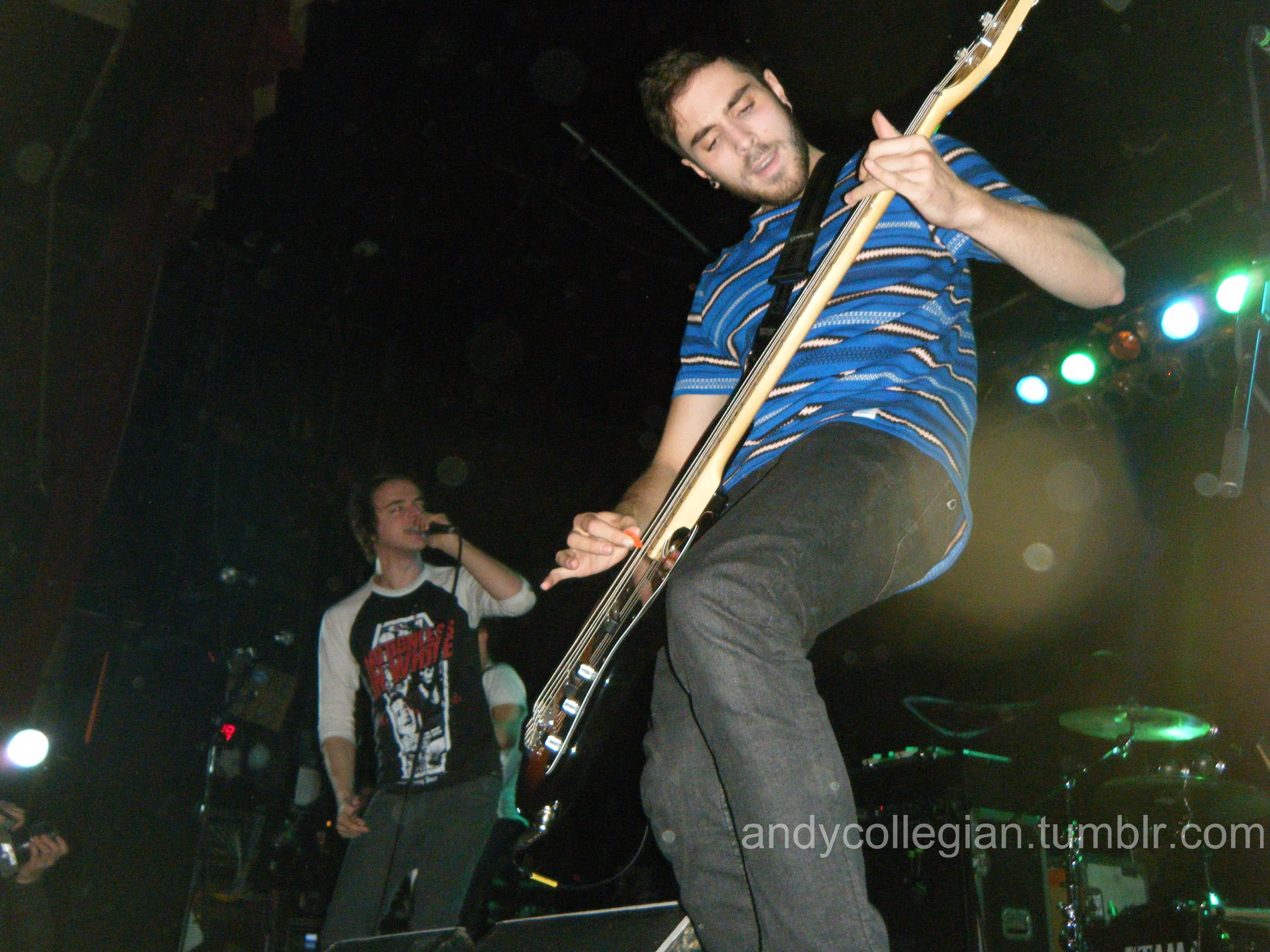
- Vocalist Bertrand Poncet (left) and bassist Mathias Rigal (right) in 2012

Background information
- Also known as: C!NCC!
- Origin: Paris, France
- Genres: Pop punk; melodic hardcore; metalcore; easycore
- Years active: 2007–2016; 2020–present
- Labels: Fearless; Ice Grill$; InVogue
- Members: Bertrand Poncet; Éric Poncet; Paul "Wilson" Cordebard; Mathias Rigal; Bastien Lafaye
- Past members: Jonathan Donnaes; Vincent Dahmer
- Website: chunknocaptainchunk.com

Chunk! No, Captain Chunk! (initialized as C!NCC!) is a French rock band formed in 2007 in Paris. The band consists of vocalist Bertrand Poncet, guitarists Éric Poncet and Paul Wilson and bassist Mathias Rigal, with founding drummer Jonathan Donnaes leaving in 2014 to be replaced by Bastien Lafaye.

The band has released four studio albums: Something for Nothing in 2010, Pardon My French in 2013, Get Lost, Find Yourself in 2015, and Gone Are the Good Days in 2021.

== History ==
=== Formation and Something for Nothing (2007–2010) ===
The band formed in 2007, when Paul Cordebard wished to experiment with blending influences from pop punk with hardcore punk and heavy metal and invited his friends Bertrand Poncet and Jonathan Donnaes to form a band with him. Shortly after their formation, they asked Bertrand's brother, Éric Poncet and close friend, Mathias Rigal who, despite having no experience as a bass guitarist, joined the band. The band name is taken from a scene in the 1985 adventure-comedy film The Goonies, in which Chunk and Sloth arrive on the scene to help their friends. Poncet describes the choice of The Goonies as a "good childhood reference" and felt the name reflected who the band members are. The band found it difficult to establish a fanbase in their native country of France as there is, in Poncet's opinion, "absolutely no rock scene." They found solace in playing in other countries around Asia, and especially in North America.

On September 2, 2010, the band released their first official single "In Friends We Trust", along with an accompanying music video. On November 1, 2010, the band released their self-produced debut album Something for Nothing.

=== Signing to Fearless Records and Pardon My French (2011–2013) ===
After signing to Fearless Records with a global deal in 2011, they re-released their debut album Something For Nothing on 19 July 2011 The band was confident in their signing with Fearless as they considered them "one of the best labels out there for that kind of music". The re-release featured a brand new album artwork and a different track listing, replacing "MILF" and "Alex Kidd in a Miracle World" with the song "Make Them Believe", which was a Japanese bonus track on the original release. To coincide with the re-release the band released a music video for "Captain Blood", which was overall the second single off the album.

In October 2011 Captain Chunk! joined The Artery Foundation's European "Across the Nation" tour headlined by Miss May I. This is the first time Captain Chunk! has performed in the United Kingdom. The tour was well received including Captain Chunk!'s, said to have featured "a downright bizarre and eclectic lineup". In December the band went back to the United States Fearless Friends Tour, a tour which exclusively features bands from the Fearless Records' roster with Blessthefall, The Word Alive, Motionless in White, and Tonight Alive. In November 2011 the band contributed a cover of Kesha's single We R Who We R on Punk Goes Pop 4 as part of the Punk Goes... cover album series which was released internationally on 21 November 2011.

In 2012 Captain Chunk! tour schedule in the United States expanded rapidly, supporting Attack Attack! in late January and February 2012 as part of their on going This Means War album support. Throughout March and April the band also supported deathcore band Chelsea Grin on their debut headline tour "The Sick Tour". Captain Chunk! also was announced for Vans Warped Tour 2012 line-up, the band toured for the entire festival and played on the Ernie Ball Stage. With their performances as part of the Warped Tour the band contributed the single "In Friends We Trust" to the Warped Tour 2012 Tour Compilation album. During their performances on the Warped Tour the band performed new songs. The band also was the main support for Woe, Is Me on their Talk Your [S]#?! Tour across November and December 2012. Although proud of how strong their fanbase in America grew in the year of touring the band found the language barrier and being a new band difficult, Poncet has said that even though the band was taught English in school, they learned more English while actually touring in America.

In January 2013 the band started to record their second album with producer Joey Sturgis in Michigan, United States. Chunk! No, Captain Chunk! performed at the Australian 2013 Soundwave festival performing at all 5 dates in: Brisbane, Sydney, Melbourne, Adelaide and Perth between 23 February and 4 March. While they were in Australia for the festival, they performed two club shows with All Time Low and Polar Bear Club. Across March and April the band returned to the United States to support the upcoming release of their second studio album. To coincide with their appearance at Texas based South by So What?! festival they wrapped a short headline tour with support from Handguns, State Champs and City Lights in mid March. The band is also supporting A Day to Remember on the first half of their Right Back at It Again tour also featuring Of Mice & Men. The band saw the opportunity to tour with one of their influences as one that couldn't be refused. This led to the band rescheduling all of their American headline tour dates of their 'Pardon My French Tour' with supporting acts For All Those Sleeping, Upon This Dawning and City Lights. The band felt they received a positive reaction from the crowd on the Right Back at It Again, and that they learned from the other bands on the bill how to give more professional performances.

On April 30, 2013, the band's second studio album Pardon My French was released. The first single off the album was entitled 'Restart'. They played Slam Dunk Festival 2013 in the United Kingdom in May and then completed their first tour of the country in September with Climates and Light You Up. The band then returned to the United States to support a co-headline tour of We Came As Romans and Silverstein in October and then to do their second headline tour of the country with Counterparts, State Champs and Living With Lions. The band had said that before the end of 2013 they are touring Japan.

The band has said that Europe was their focus for 2014, In which it was announced they would act as main support for We Came As Romans along with The Color Morale and Palm Reader in the United Kingdom. The band will appear on Warped Tour 2014 in the United States. In early February, it was announced that the band will make their second appearance in the Punk Goes... series on the Punk Goes 90's 2 album, covering "All Star" by Smash Mouth. It was also revealed in March that the band will be releasing a music video accompanying the album's release for the song.

On May 13, it was announced that the band will be releasing a deluxe version of their second album Pardon My French, which will feature 3 previously unreleased tracks and an acoustic version Taking Chances, and will be released on June 13.

=== Get Lost, Find Yourself, and hiatus (2014–2019) ===
Shortly after the Warped Tour, drummer Jonathan Donnaes left the band as of August 4, 2014, leaving the following message as of his departure:

"Since yesterday I officially left the band. This is a decision I took last year already. A new life, with my [new] fiancee, and a new job are waiting for me. But don't worry, the boys in Chunk will keep rocking the stage all over the world, and one of my bestfriend will be their new drummer. I just want to say thank you, for everything. You made my dream becomes true, and I will always be greatful [sic] for that. Au revoir mes amis!"

On March 11, Chunk! No, Captain Chunk! announced their upcoming third album to be titled Get Lost, Find Yourself and revealed its album artwork and track listing.

On August 12, 2016, Fearless Records released a new song on their YouTube channel called "Blame It On This Song".

After Warped Tour 2016, the band went on a hiatus, "We’re taking a break at the moment to focus on other things but hopefully new stuff in 2019."

On December 25, 2019, the band announced that they will play a festival date, thus ending their hiatus.

=== Gone Are the Good Days (2020–present) ===
On May 9, 2020, during Fearless Records' Fearless at Home event it was announced that the band were working on new music which they later told Wall of Sound will be released in 2021 during an interview. On May 14, 2021 the band dropped a new song called "Bitter" and also announced the new album Gone Are the Good Days which was released on July 30, 2021.

== Musical style ==
Chunk! No, Captain Chunk!'s musical style is defined by a pop punk sound, contrasted with "growling hardcore" and a "heavy metal alter ego". Guitarist Paul Wilson summarized this style by saying the band is "kind of bipolar". The band fuses the upbeat melodies of pop punk with aggressive breakdowns, guitar chugging and lower guitar tunings such as Drop Bb to give their music a heavier edge. They have been said to "combine the energy of punk, the catchiness of pop, and the crushing assault of hardcore into a power party sound". Singer Bertrand Poncet has stated that although the band is French, their sound is American, which is why they write lyrics in English.

The band's debut album Something for Nothing has been said by the band to incorporate elements of pop punk, hardcore, metal, acoustic, indie, and dance music, employing singing, death growls and keyboards. The style of Pardon My French was intended by the band to center around the theme of bipolarity, with Poncet stating that the song "Bipolar Mind" epitomised their contrasting musical style well, having "the catchiest chorus placed right next to the nastiest breakdown". Rhythm guitarist Paul Wilson stated that "I Am Nothing Like You", also from Pardon My French, is the heaviest song they have ever written.

Chunk! No, Captain Chunk! have been described by various critics as fusing pop punk, metalcore, melodic hardcore, and post-hardcore. This eclectic blend of styles has been described as "easycore" or "popcore", and compared to the style of A Day to Remember and Four Year Strong. Nevertheless, Chunk! No, Captain Chunk! claim they never intended to sound like these bands and simply wanted to apply aggressive musical traits to pop punk. They have said that they are influenced by a variety of styles, including but not limited to dubstep, classical, rock, heavy metal and pop.

== Band members ==
Current

- Bertrand "Bert" Poncet – lead vocals, keyboards (2007–present)
- Éric Poncet – lead guitar, backing vocals (2007–present)
- Paul "Wilson" Cordebard – rhythm guitar, backing vocals (2007–present)
- Mathias Rigal – bass (2007–present)
- Bastien Lafaye – drums, percussion (2014–present)

Former

- Jonathan Donnaes – drums, percussion (2007–2014)
- Vincent Dahmer – bass (2007)

== Discography ==
Chunk! No, Captain Chunk! discography
- Studio albums: 4
- Extended plays: 1
- Singles: 13
- Music videos: 10

=== Studio albums ===
Name	Details	Peak chart position			
Name	Details	US	US Alt	US Indie	US Rock
Something for Nothing	Released: November 1, 2010; Label: InVogue, Fearless; Format: CD, music download	—	—	—	—
Pardon My French	Released: April 29, 2013; Label: Fearless; Format: CD, music download	72	15	15	20
Get Lost, Find Yourself	Release: May 19, 2015; Label: Fearless; Format: CD, music download	113	13	14	19
Gone Are the Good Days	Release: July 30, 2021; Label: Fearless; Format: CD, music download	—	—	—	—

=== Extended plays ===
Name	Year
Chunk! No, Captain Chunk!	2008

=== Compilation appearances ===
Name	Year	Album	Label
"We R Who We R" (Ke$ha cover)	2011	Punk Goes Pop 4	Fearless
"In Friends We Trust"	2012	Warped Tour 2012 Compilation	SideOneDummy
"All Star" (Smash Mouth cover)	2014	Punk Goes 90's 2	Fearless
"Restart"	2014	Warped Tour 2014 Compilation	SideOneDummy
"City Of Light"	2016	Warped Tour 2016 Compilation	SideOneDummy
"Disenchanted" (My Chemical Romance cover)	2016	Rock Sound Presents: The Black Parade	Rock Sound

=== Singles ===
Name	Year	Album	Label
"In Friends We Trust"	2010	Something for Nothing	Fearless
"We R Who We R" (Ke$ha cover)	2011	Punk Goes Pop 4	Fearless
"Captain Blood"	2011	Something for Nothing	Fearless
"Restart"	2013	Pardon My French	Fearless
"Taking Chances"	2013	Pardon My French	Fearless
"All Star" (Smash Mouth cover)	2014	Punk Goes 90's 2	Fearless
"Playing Dead"	2015	Get Lost, Find Yourself	Fearless
"The Other Line"	2015	Get Lost, Find Yourself	Fearless
"Blame It On This Song"	2016	Blame It On This Song – Single	Fearless
"Disenchanted" (My Chemical Romance cover)	2016	Rock Sound Presents: The Black Parade	Rock Sound
"Bitter"	2021	Gone Are the Good Days	Fearless
"Gone Are The Good Days"	2021	Gone Are the Good Days	Fearless
"Complete You"	2021	Gone Are the Good Days	Fearless

=== Music videos ===
Name	Year	Album	Director	Type	Link
"In Friends We Trust"	2010	Something for Nothing	Romain Julien	Narrative	
"Captain Blood"	2011	Something for Nothing	Unknown	Performance	
"Taking Chances"	2013	Pardon My French	New Thought Movement	Tour footage	
"Haters Gonna Hate"	2013	Pardon My French	Pardon My French	Narrative	
"All Star" (Smash Mouth cover)	2014	Punk Goes 90s 2	Pardon My French	Narrative	
"The Other Line"	2015	Get Lost, Find Yourself	Leo Pia	Performance	
"Bitter"	2021	Gone Are The Good Days	Pavel Trebukhin	Performance	
"Gone Are The Good Days"	2021	Gone Are The Good Days	Pavel Trebukhin	Performance	
"Complete You"	2021	Gone Are The Good Days			
"Marigold"	2022	Gone Are The Good Days			
