= Before Their Eyes =

American post-hardcore band

- Origin: Findlay, Ohio, U.S.
- Genres: Post-hardcore, alternative rock
- Years active: 2006–present
- Labels: InVogue, Rise
- Members: Nick Moore; Anthony Damschroder; Jordan Disorbo; Jarrett Hottman
- Past members: Jacob Bridges; James Arnold; Elliott Gruenberg; Brenden Zapp; James Nahorny; Cory Ridenour; Nathan Warren; Brandon Howard; Evan McKeever; Zach Baird; Landon Tewers; Brandon Rosiar
- Website: www.facebook.com/beforetheireyesband

Before Their Eyes is an American post-hardcore band from Findlay, Ohio. The band is currently signed to InVogue Records.

== History ==
=== Early years (2006–2011) ===
The band was founded by vocalist Nick Moore in 2006. The band name was taken from Romans 3:18: "There is no fear of God before their eyes." Their second album, The Dawn of My Death, was released October 28, 2008, and reached No. 9 on the Billboard Heatseekers chart. Their third album, Untouchable, was released March 16, 2010, and reached No. 22 on the Billboard Heatseekers Chart. After this album, guitarist Landon Tewers quit Before Their Eyes to focus on his band The Plot in You. Simultaneous with Tewer's departure, Moore parted ways with the band. With bassist Anthony Damschroder and drummer Jarrett Hottman being the only remaining members as of late 2010, the band took a hiatus.

They reformed in 2011 and began the process of writing their fourth studio album, Redemption was released March 26, 2012, through InVogue Records and charted No. 29 on Billboard Heatseekers Chart and No. 30 on Billboard Top Christian Albums. Their fifth album, Midwest Modesty, was released on December 22, 2015. It was co-written and produced by Craig Owens.

The band has played many tours, including Vans Warped Tour 2011, Spring Break Your Heart Tour with Forever The Sickest Kids, Tonight Alive, We Are The In Crowd & Breathe Carolina, The Bangover Tour with Blessthefall, Shipwreck in the Sand Tour with Silverstein, Norma Jean and Blessthefall, the Coaxial Flutter Tour alongside Saosin, the Hot N' Heavy Tour alongside Drop Dead, Gorgeous and He Is Legend, the Artery Across The Nation Tour with A Skylit Drive and Four Letter Lie, the Black on Black Tour with Escape the Fate, the Scream the Prayer Tour in 2008 with Here I Come Falling, and Agraceful, and the One Moment Management Tour with Eyes Set to Kill, Ice Nine Kills, I See Stars, Oceana, and LoveHateHero.

=== Redemption (2011-present) ===
On June 12, 2011, Before Their Eyes announced on their Facebook page that their fourth full-length, entitled Redemption, would be released on March 27, 2012. The band also announced that Nicholas Alan Ingram (Capital House Studio) would producing the new record with Joey Sturgis mastering it. On January 1, 2012, Before Their Eyes announced via Facebook the release of the album's lead single, "Lies". The video appeared on the YouTube channel of the group's record label, InVogue Records.

On February 4, 2012, they shot a live music video in Findlay, Ohio at The Lighthouse for the single "Lies" and the band announced it would be released in early March.

In November 2012, Before Their Eyes announced that they would be breaking up in 2013. They planned on recording two EPs, one containing songs that reflect their heavier sound, and the other containing songs that reflect their more pop oriented sound, but decided to just release one more full-length album titled, "The Finale" being released sometime in 2013.

On August 3, 2013, the band announced on their Facebook page that they are not breaking up anymore. As a result, the band has changed the title to their fifth full-length record to "Before Their Eyes II" and have announced that it will be under a new label.

On November 21, 2013, the band announced on their Facebook page that they have been in the studio for the past month writing and recording "II" with producer Tom Denney.

On January 3, 2015, the band posted that they're finishing the album in February with producer Nick Ingram.

Their most recent album, Midwest Modesty was released later in 2015. It made it on to Billboard's Heatseakers Albums ranked at 7th to start off the new year in 2016

On June 27, 2019, the re-release of "City in a Snow Globe" was put on Spotify and YouTube.

They released a new single "Heaven Feels So Far Away" on April 24, 2026.

== Band members ==
=== Current members ===
- Nick Moore – lead vocals, keyboard, piano, additional guitar (2006–2010, 2010-present)
- Anthony Damschroder – bass, backing vocals (2006-present)
- Jordan "Xdetune" Disorbo – lead guitar, backing vocals (2010-present)
- Jarrett Hottman – drums, percussion (2006–2011, 2013-present)

=== Former members ===
- James Nahorny – rhythm guitar (2006)
- Brandon Howard – bass (2006)
- Nathan Warren – bass (2006)
- Cory Ridenour – rhythm guitar (2006–2007)
- Brenden Zapp – lead guitar, backing vocals (2006–2008)
- James Arnold – lead vocals, keyboards, piano (2010)
- Elliott Gruenberg – lead guitar, backing vocals (2009–2010)
- Landon Tewers – rhythm guitar, unclean vocals (2008–2010)
- Evan McKeever – rhythm guitar, backing vocals (2010–2011)
- Zach Baird – drums (2012–2013)
- J. Hughes – drums, percussion (2009–2011)
- Brandon Rosiar – rhythm guitar (2011–2013)

== Discography ==
=== Studio albums ===
- Before Their Eyes (2007)
- The Dawn of My Death (2008)
- Untouchable (2010)
- Redemption (2012)
- Midwest Modesty (2015)

=== Music videos ===
- "City in a Snow Globe" (2007, Before Their Eyes)
- "Life Was All a Dream" (2008, The Dawn of My Death)
- "Sing to Me" (2010, Untouchable)
- "Rick vs. Nick" (2010, Untouchable)
- "Lies" (2012, Redemption)
