= InVogue Records =

- Founded: 2009
- Founder: Nick Moore
- Distributor: The Orchard
- Genre: Post-hardcore, alternative rock, metalcore, pop punk, melodic hardcore
- Country of origin: United States
- Location: Findlay, Ohio
- Official website: www.invoguerecords.com

InVogue Records is an American record company based in Findlay, Ohio. It was founded by Nick Moore, lead singer of Before Their Eyes, in 2009. In the fall of 2011 InVogue Records signed a distribution deal with Independent Label Group (owned by Warner Music Group) and Alternative Distribution Alliance. In the summer of 2017 InVogue signed a new distribution deal with Sony/RED. The deal was merged into The Orchard/Sony.

== Current artists ==
- Dead Bundy
- Designer Disguise
- Discrepancies
- Dreamhouse
- Diva Bleach
- Go For Gold
- Healer
- Heart To Heart
- He Is We
- If Not For Me
- Mirrorcell
- Mouth Culture
- Patternist
- Qualia
- Saiah
- Spirit Leaves
- Stain The Canvas
- Until We Get Caught
- Widmore

== Past artists ==
=== Active ===
- Ashland (Unsigned)
- Assuming We Survive
- Before Their Eyes
- Being As An Ocean (Unsigned)
- Boys of Fall (Unsigned)
- Convictions (Unsigned)
- Chase Huglin
- Chunk! No, Captain Chunk! (Fearless Records)
- Clover The Girl
- Dark Divine (Thriller Records)
- Dead Eyes (Thriller Records)
- Dayseeker (Spinefarm Records)
- Everyone Dies in Utah (Unsigned)
- Famous Last Words (SBG Records)
- FFN
- Floods
- For All I Am
- Ghost Key
- Glass Houses
- Hawthorne Heights (Pure Noise Records)
- Hazing (Unsigned)
- Heavy Things (Unsigned)
- In Her Own Words (Thriller Records)
- Kingdom of Giants (SharpTone Records)
- Makari
- Mark Rose (Unsigned)
- Motives (Smartpunk Records)
- Normandie (Easy Life Records)
- Patient Sixty-Seven (Unsigned)
- The Parallel
- The Plot In You (Fearless Records)
- Punchline
- Restless Streets (Unsigned)
- September Stories (Unsigned)
- Secret Eyes (Unsigned)
- Shreddy Krueger (Unsigned)
- Sienna Skies (Unsigned)
- Smash Into Pieces (Unsigned)
- Whether, I (Reunited)
- Woven In Hiatus
- Young Thieves

=== Disbanded ===
- Akissforjersey (Inactive)
- Another Hero Dies
- As Artifacts
- The Bad Chapter (Inactive since Dec 2017)
- Belle Histoire
- Bullets and Belvedere
- Challenger!
- City Lights
- Castle No Kings
- Conspire
- Courage My Love
- Dependence (Inactive)
- Follow My Lead
- From Atlantis
- Get Up Texas
- Helia (Hiatus)
- Hotel Books
- Idlehands
- InDirections (Now known as Closure)
- In League (Inactive)
- JT Woodruff (Inactive)
- LEAV/E/ARTH (Inactive)
- Legacy
- Let It Happen
- Liferuiner (Inactive)
- Mirror Eyes (Now known as Floods)
- Royal
- Sleep City
- Spies Like Us
- That's Outrageous!
- The Illumination
- Until We Are Ghosts (Inactive)
- Worthwhile
- 5 Years & Counting

== InVogue Records Tours ==
In the summer of 2014, InVogue Records announced the inaugural InVogue Records Tour, in partnership with MerchNow, featuring Famous Last Words, Whether I, For All I Am, and Until We Are Ghosts. The tour wrapped around the midwest (where the label is based), as well as dates on the east coast. In the fall of 2015, Nick Moore announced on Twitter that Hotel Books would be embarking on the next InVogue Tour. In the fall of that year, Hotel Books announced the "Run Wild, Young Beauty" tour, named after their debut full-length album. Due to the album-branded title, and the package's addition of Tragic Hero Records band Bad Luck, it was unclear if this tour was truly the annual InVogue Records Tour. Hotel Books took out label mates Motives and Until We Are Ghosts on this tour as well.

Spring 2016 came the official announcement of a proper InVogue Records Tour featuring Hotel Books. The tour was co-headlined by Dayseeker, and included Convictions as support. This tour hit the west coast, midwest and east coast, but the first date, in San Diego, CA, was without Hotel Books due to their vocalist, Cam Smith, having a concussion. An east coast InVogue Records Tour took place in the fall featuring Convictions, Everyone Dies in Utah, Glass Houses and Conspire. The fall edition of the tour also included a stop at So What?! Music Festival in Dallas, Texas.

In the winter of 2016, Cam Smith announced on their Twitter that Hotel Books would be taking the InVogue Records Tour to Europe, and "to other exciting places." The tweet was followed by an official announcement three days later. InVogue Records announced a European edition of the IVR Tour featuring Hotel Books and Convictions. Two weeks later, a Japanese IVR Tour was announced as well, featuring the same two bands. The tour also included two exclusive dates in Russia.

In January 2017, the label launched the first ever InVogue Records Unplugged Tour, featuring JT Woodruff (of Hawthorne Heights), In Her Own Words, Hazing and Woven in Hiatus. The tour featured a round-robin style performance and went from the west coast to the midwest.

In the summer of 2018, InVogue Records announced another InVogue Records Tour featuring Boys of Fall, In Her Own Words and Ky Rodgers.

== Compilation albums ==
- Happy Holidays, I Miss You (Released: November 25, 2016)

== See also ==
- List of record labels
- Nick Moore
