= Mattias Adolfsson =

Swedish illustrator (born 1965)

- Born: 1965 (age 60–61)
- Education: University of Art and Design in Gothenburg (M.A.)
- Occupation: Graphic Illustrator
- Spouse: Cecilia Levy
- Website: https://mattiasadolfsson.com/

Mattias Adolfsson (born 1965) is a Swedish graphic artist and illustrator, known for his detailed and quirky drawings in ink and watercolor. He lives and works in Sigtuna, just outside of Stockholm, Sweden.

== Early career ==
He was educated from the University of Art and Design in Gothenburg and holds a Master of Arts in Graphic design. Originally he began training as an engineer but found the non-math parts to be very boring so he changed to Architecture, and then to Graphic Design. Adolfsson worked as a video game designer, using his knowledge of mathematics and architecture to create 3D images for the gaming industry for 10 years.

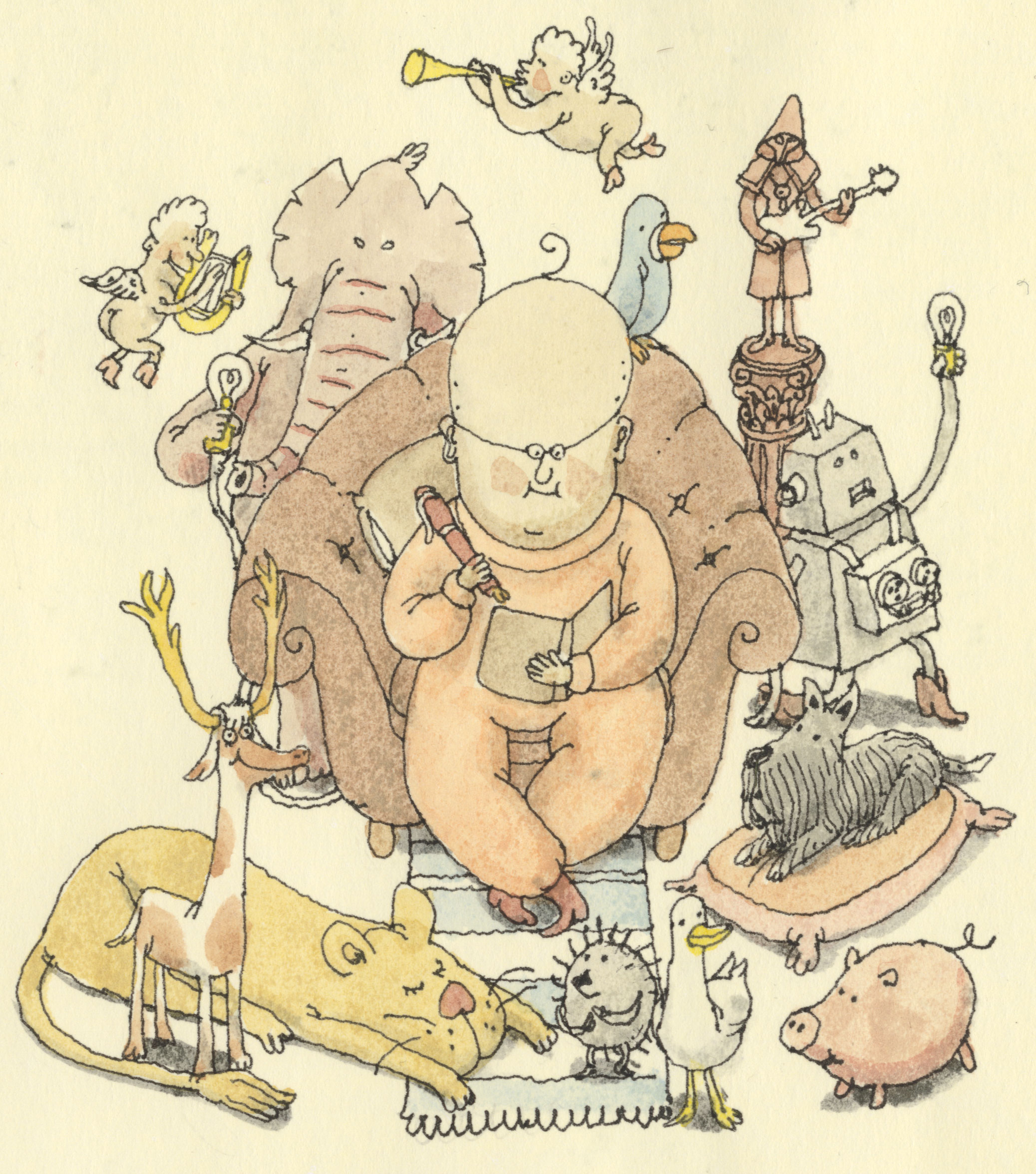
Self-portrait of Mattias Adolfsson, a Swedish graphic artist and illustrator

=== Game Credits ===
- Kosmopolska (1997) - Design - Concept and Game Idea

=== Art/Graphics ===
- Battlefield: Bad Company (2008) (Additional Artists)
- Race 07: Official WTCC Game (2007) (Track Artists)
- Race: The Official WTCC Game (2006) (Track Artists)
- RalliSport Challenge 2 (2004) (Artists)
- Stardom: Your Quest For Fame (2000) (Graphic Form)
- Backpacker 2 (1997) (Illustration, Animation)

== Methods ==
Adolfsson promotes the use of a sketchbook, which he carries with him everywhere. As he travels, or with any other time he has, he will use his fountain pen and create a fantasy world based on what he sees around him. His journals have served as a basis for much of his published work and he has filled 39 of them in the last decade, showing his progress on his social media sites. When he returns to his studio, he uses an ink wash to add shadow and depth and then adds watercolor to the drawings.

He has been a big proponent of using social media, including blogs, Instagram and Twitter to make his art available to all and to advertise his skills.

His methods and some of his works are featured in an eight-page spread in Sketching from the Imagination: An Insight into Creative Drawing from 3dtotal Publishing, created to provide inspiration for other artists. One of his drawings also appears on the cover.

== Album Covers ==
In 2007, Adolfsson was contacted to create the cover art for Dance Gavin Dance's album Downtown Battle Mountain and has made art for all of their albums since. In addition, he created artwork for The Old Ceremony's 2009 album, Walk on Thin Air. After discovering Adolfsson's works in a comic shop, Weezer frontman Rivers Cuomo became infatuated with his work and asked him to produce the artwork for their album OK Human, released in 2021. Dig! named it one of the Top 40 Album Covers of 2021.

- Downtown Battle Mountain, 2007, Rise Records
- Dance Gavin Dance, 2008, Rise Records
- Walk on Thin Air, 2009, Alyosha Records
- Happiness, 2009, Rise Records
- Live At Bamboozle, 2010, Rise Records
- Downtown Battle Mountain II, 2011, Rise Records
- Acceptance Speech, 2013, Rise Records
- Instant Gratification , 2015, Rise Records
- Tree City Sessions, 2016, Rise Records
- Mothership, 2016, Rise Records
- Artificial Selection, 2018, Rise Records
- Head Hunter, 2019, Rise Records
- Blood Wolf, 2019, Rise Records
- Afterburner, 2020, Rise Records
- Tree City Sessions 2, 2020, Rise Records
- OK Human, 2021, Atlantic Records
- Jackpot Juicer, 2022, Rise Records
- Pantheon, 2025, Rise Records

== Notable illustrations ==
Adolfsson has produced works for Disney, the New York Times, WIRED, and The New Yorker.

- This is how hit pop songs are created. DN.SE. 1 November 2015. Read 22 April 2020, Davidson, Adam (28 December 2011).
- Will China Outsmart the US?(In American English). The New York Times. ISSN 0362-4331. Read 22 April 2020.
- Visiting Swedish Illustrator Mattias Adolfsson's Planet On His First Trip To Taiwan(in English), Kassy Cho, City543. Retrieved 22 April 2020.
- Here is the most beautiful book of the year. 23 April 2020.
- AI-AP | American Illustration – American Photography. www.ai-ap.com, Read 23 April 2020

Mattias Adolfsson has created commissioned artwork for Atelier Choux used on baby blankets and packaging, Chipotle, and Nickelodeon.

- Regatta, 24" x 32" 1500 piece puzzle, Publisher: Heye, UPC: 4001689298913
- Spaceship, 24" x 32" 1500 piece puzzle, Publisher: Heye, UPC: 4001689298418
- Music Maniac, 19.5" x 27.5" 1000 piece puzzle, Publisher: Heye, UPC: 4001689299286
- Curiosity Cabinet, 24" x 32" 1500 piece puzzle, Publisher: Heye, UPC: 4001689297947
- Illustrator for Carlsen, Bonnier, Till mitt barnbarn, 15 Oct. 2009, ISBN 978-9163855146

== Awards ==
- American Illustration (AI # 39) – Two images from "The Second in Line" selected by jury for inclusion in the hardcover annual.
- The Most Beautiful Book of the Year 2013 (Swedish Book Art). Each year the Swedish Book Association selects the top 25 books in numerous categories, including art. The 25 selected entries receive diplomas and the selected entries are presented in an exhibition catalog and on the Swedish Book Art's website. The books are displayed at the Royal Library in Stockholm and at exhibitions in various places in Sweden and internationally for one year. In addition, they represent Sweden in the international book competition Die Schönsten Bücher aus aller Welt, which exhibits every year at the fairs in Leipzig and Frankfurt.
- Best Album Artwork - Afterburner - Dance Gavin Dance - Heavy Music Awards - 2021

== Personal life ==
Adolfsson is married to Cecilia Levy, also an artist, and has two daughters. He enjoys skiing and hiking in the Swedish countryside.

== Publications ==
- Mattias Unfiltered: The Sketchbook Art of Mattias Adolfsson, 2012, BOOM! Studios, ISBN 978-1608862771
- Mattias Adolfsson's Traffic (Pictura), 2014, Templar Publishing, ASIN B00SB2SQT6
- First in Line, 2011, Sanatorium Förlag, ISBN 978-9187243066
- Second in Line, 2013, Sanatorium Förlag, ISBN 978-9187243073
- Third in Line, 2015, Sanatorium Förlag, ISBN 978-9187243080
- Sketchbooks #42, 43 & 44, 2026, Sanatorium Förlag, ISBN 978-9187243479 Limited Edition 300 Copies
