= Tree City Sessions 2 =

Live album by Dance Gavin Dance
- Released: December 25, 2020
- Recorded: 2020
- Studio: Pus Cavern, Sacramento, California
- Genre: Post-hardcore; experimental rock; emo pop; progressive rock; funk rock; math rock; pop rock; screamo
- Length: 65:02
- Label: Rise
- Producer: Kris Crummett

Dance Gavin Dance chronology
Afterburner (2020)	Tree City Sessions 2 (2020)	Jackpot Juicer (2022)

Tree City Sessions 2 is the third live album by American rock band Dance Gavin Dance, released on December 25, 2020, through Rise Records. It serves as a follow-up the group's 2016 live album Tree City Sessions and was mixed and mastered by Kris Crummett.

== Background ==
On May 13, 2016, Dance Gavin Dance released the live album, Tree City Sessions, which consisted of 12 songs from across the band's catalog performed live at Pus Cavern Recording Studios in Sacramento, California. The album was produced and mixed by the band's former guitarist Josh Benton and Joe Johnston. The live album's release gained much fanfare and called for the group to record a second Tree City Sessions.

On April 24, 2020, the band released their ninth full-length studio album, Afterburner, which was preceded by four singles; "Prisoner", "Strawberry's Wake", "Lyrics Lie", and "Three Wishes". In support of the album, the group originally announced a 2020 spring tour to take place from March to May with Animals as Leaders, Issues, Veil of Maya, and Royal Coda, however this was postponed to 2021 due to the ongoing COVID-19 pandemic. On July 17, 2020, the band performed their first online concert streaming event.

On March 4, 2021, Rise Records released the Tree City Sessions 2 live performance video for "Man Of the Year".

== Recording ==
Tree City Sessions 2 was recorded in 2020 at Pus Cavern Recording Studios in Sacramento, California. The album was mixed and mastered by Kris Crummett at Interlace Audio in North Portland, Oregon.

== Tree City Sessions 2 streaming event ==
On December 1, 2020, the band announced the Tree City Sessions 2 virtual concert streaming event, which premiered on December 19, 2020. The concert was filmed on location at the Tower Bridge in Sacramento in early November 2020. The group's setlist was a fan-voted affair. The streaming event included a pre-show, which featured SiriusXM radio host Caity Babs interviewing the band and visiting significant locations around the greater Sacramento area.

== Track listing ==
No.	Title	Original album	Length
1.	"The Backwards Pumpkin Song"	Downtown Battle Mountain	4:47
2.	"Uneasy Hearts Weigh The Most" (featuring Andrew Wells)	Dance Gavin Dance	4:14
3.	"NASA"	Happiness	3:33
4.	"Blue Dream"	Downtown Battle Mountain II	5:12
5.	"Strawberry Swisher, Pt. 3"	Acceptance Speech	4:06
6.	"Jesus H. Macy"	Acceptance Speech	3:20
7.	"Stroke God, Millionaire"	Instant Gratification	3:21
8.	"Awkward"	Instant Gratification	4:05
9.	"Summertime Gladness"	Non-album single	3:58
10.	"Inspire The Liars"	Mothership	5:10
11.	"Man Of The Year"	Mothership	6:24
12.	"Son of Robot"	Artificial Selection	4:31
13.	"Evaporate" (featuring Andrew Wells)	Artificial Selection	5:45
14.	"Strawberry's Wake"	Afterburner	4:08
15.	"Nothing Shameful" (featuring Andrew Wells)	Afterburner	4:25

== Personnel ==
Dance Gavin Dance

- Tilian Pearson - clean vocals
- Jon Mess - unclean vocals
- Will Swan - lead guitar
- Andrew Wells – rhythm guitar, backing vocals (on tracks 7, 10, 12, 14), guest vocals (on tracks 2, 13, 15)
- Tim Feerick - bass guitar
- Matt Mingus - drums, percussion

Additional personnel

- Kris Crummett - mixing, mastering
