= Jackpot Juicer =

Studio album by Dance Gavin Dance
- Released: July 29, 2022
- Recorded: April–July 2021
- Studios: Interlace Audio (Portland, Oregon)
- Genres: Post-hardcore; pop rock; experimental rock; emo; progressive rock
- Length: 62:57
- Label: Rise
- Producer: Kris Crummett

Dance Gavin Dance chronology
| Tree City Sessions 2 (2020) | Jackpot Juicer (2022) | Pantheon (2025) |

Singles from Jackpot Juicer
- 1. "Synergy" Released: March 24, 2022; 2. "Pop Off!" Released: May 4, 2022; 3. "Die Another Day" Released: July 7, 2022; 4. "Cream Of the Crop" Released: July 21, 2022; 5. "Feels Bad Man" Released: July 28, 2022

Jackpot Juicer is the tenth full-length studio album by American rock band Dance Gavin Dance, released on July 29, 2022, on Rise Records. It serves as the follow-up to their ninth studio album, Afterburner (2020). Produced by Kris Crummett, the album was recorded at Interlace Audio in Portland, Oregon, between April and July 2021 and is the band's longest album to date consisting of eighteen tracks and a runtime of one hour and three minutes. It is the band's first studio album to be credited as a sextet since Acceptance Speech (2013) as well as their first to feature Andrew Wells as an official member since joining as a touring guitarist in 2015. It is also their final release to feature bassist Tim Feerick, who died on April 13, 2022, and vocalist Tilian Pearson, who left the band in April 2024.

The lead single "Synergy", featuring Rob Damiani of English rock band Don Broco, was released on March 24, 2022. "Pop Off!" was released as the second single on May 4. Three more singles, "Die Another Day", "Cream Of the Crop", and "Feels Bad Man", were released in July. To support the album, the band performed at the second inaugural SwanFest on April 23, 2022, in Sacramento, California, followed by a headlining US spring tour in April and May with supporting acts Memphis May Fire, Volumes, and Moon Tooth. A summer tour transpired in July and August 2022 with support from American post-hardcore bands Royal Coda and Body Thief.

== Background ==
Prior to the release of their ninth studio album Afterburner (2020), the band had planned a spring tour in the US and Canada to take place in March and April 2020, but due to the COVID-19 pandemic, the tour was postponed multiple times. On July 9, 2020, the band announced a full production multi-cam album release concert stream for Afterburner, which took place on July 17 to compensate for the tour's cancellation. On December 19, 2020, the band broadcast their Tree City Sessions 2 concert streaming event in which the band performed a fan-voted set on the Tower Bridge in Sacramento, California. The live album, Tree City Sessions 2, was released to digital and streaming services on December 25, 2020.

On February 21, 2021, the band announced the rescheduled Afterburner Tour dates which spanned from September 7 to October 20, 2021, with support from Polyphia, Veil of Maya, Eidola, and Wolf & Bear. The tour was plagued by members of the band and touring crew falling ill to COVID-19 on multiple occasions. However, the band continued to finish the run. In 2022, it was confirmed that Andrew Wells of American post-hardcore band Eidola had joined the band as an official member after having been a touring guitarist since November 2015.

On April 14, 2022, the band released a statement announcing the death of longtime bassist Tim Feerick who died the night before. In June, it was revealed that vocalist Tilian Pearson was stepping away from the band after allegations of sexual misconduct were brought to light. He rejoined the band in November 2022.

On December 30, 2022, the band released the Instrumental version of Jackpot Juicer.

== Recording ==
Recording sessions for the album took place between April and July 2021 at Interlace Audio with producer Kris Crummett in Portland, Oregon. On May 8, 2021, drummer Matthew Mingus revealed he was in the studio recording drums for the album. On June 14, singer Tilian Pearson confirmed that he had begun recording vocals. On July 11, Pearson revealed that sessions for the album had concluded. In a 2021 interview, guitarist Andrew Wells disclosed that the album will have "more songs than any other DGD album" and that Wolf & Bear guitarist Louie Baltazar had contributed guitar parts for the album. Royal Coda guitarist Sergio Medina wrote and recorded second guitar for the track "Back On Deck".

In an interview with Alternative Press, Pearson spoke about writing and recording vocals for the album and how it differed from previous sessions for past studio albums. "We spent more time [recording the album] and we were in a really good environment. Jon [Mess, screamer], Andrew [Wells, vocalist of Eidola] and I rented an Airbnb and just chilled — probably for over a month for me and Jon. Because of that, we didn't take any more time on any songs — we just wrote more. It was mostly a positive experience the whole time. Jon and I collaborated more than we usually do, and that was nice. Andrew and I, too — he's on this album a lot." Also speaking on the musical aspect of the album, Pearson said "It's a bit bigger-sounding than usual for us. It sounds a little more like our live set than the clarity of Mothership, where you can hear every single note the guitar is playing. There's a little bit more of a togetherness to the sound. And because we had the most time to work on it, it's our longest album — I can reveal that." Jackpot Juicer is the band's longest studio album to date, consisting of 18 tracks and a runtime of one hour and three minutes.

== Promotion ==
=== Tour ===
Professional ratings
Review scores
| Source | Rating |
|---|---|
| Boolin Tunes | 9/10 |
| Rock N Load | 9/10 |
| Ghost Cult magazine | 7/10 |
| Wall of Sound | 5/10 |

On February 2, 2022, the band announced a US spring tour, which began on April 26 and concluded on May 20, with support from Memphis May Fire, Volumes, and Moon Tooth. The band's second inaugural SwanFest, which featured performances from Animals As Leaders, Movements, and The Fall of Troy, among others, took place at Heart Health Park in Sacramento, California on April 23, 2022. Originally, the band were to embark on American rock band Coheed & Cambria's A Window of the Waking Mind summer tour in July and August 2022, yet were removed following allegations of sexual assault being brought against Tilian Pearson. The band announced a US summer tour on June 27, 2022, which spanned from July 26 to August 24, 2022, with support from American post-hardcore bands Royal Coda and Body Thief. Due to Tilian's removal from the band, guitarist Andrew Wells took over lead vocal duties while Veil of Maya guitarist Marc Okubo performed second guitar and Royal Coda guitarist Sergio Medina played bass guitar.

On March 1, 2022, they announced a headlining tour in the UK and Europe that will take place in September 2022 with support from Caskets, Eidola, and Volumes. However, this tour was postponed to January 2023. On April 25, 2022, it was announced that Dance Gavin Dance will support English rock band Don Broco on their four-date UK tour in March 2023 with Papa Roach.

=== Singles ===
On March 24, 2022, the band released the lead single, "Synergy", featuring Rob Damiani of English rock band Don Broco, to digital download and streaming services. The music video premiered on the official Rise Records channel on YouTube on the same day, which was directed by Samuel Halleen, who previously directed the group's videos for "Betrayed By the Game", "Midnight Crusade", and "Head Hunter". On May 4, 2022, the band released the album's second single, "Pop Off!", to digital and streaming services. The music video for "Pop Off!" premiered on the same day, which continued the storyline previously established in the video for "Synergy".

On July 7, "Die Another Day" was released as the third single with its music video premiering on July 14. "Cream Of the Crop" was released as the fourth single on July 21. The fifth and final single, "Feels Bad Man", was released on July 28.

== Track listing ==
All tracks are written by Will Swan, Tilian Pearson, Jon Mess, Tim Feerick, and Matt Mingus, except where noted.

Jackpot Juicer track listing
| No. | Title | Writer(s) | Length |
|---|---|---|---|
| 1. | "Untitled 2" | | 0:34 |
| 2. | "Cream of the Crop" | Swan, Pearson, Mess, Feerick, Mingus, Nicholas Marsh | 3:39 |
| 3. | "Synergy" (featuring Rob Damiani) | | 3:17 |
| 4. | "Holy Ghost Spirit" | | 3:50 |
| 5. | "For the Jeers" | | 4:11 |
| 6. | "Ember" | | 3:46 |
| 7. | "Pop Off!" | | 3:08 |
| 8. | "One Man's Cringe" | | 3:43 |
| 9. | "Feels Bad Man" | | 3:19 |
| 10. | "Die Another Day" | | 3:41 |
| 11. | "Two Secret Weapons" | | 3:30 |
| 12. | "Polka Dot Dobbins" | | 2:45 |
| 13. | "Long Nights in Jail" | | 3:04 |
| 14. | "Back on Deck" | | 3:32 |
| 15. | "Current Events" | | 4:17 |
| 16. | "Pray to God for Your Mother" | | 3:49 |
| 17. | "Swallowed by Eternity" | | 5:04 |
| 18. | "Have a Great Life" | | 3:48 |
| Total length: | | | 62:57 |

== Personnel ==
Dance Gavin Dance

- Jon Mess – unclean vocals
- Tilian Pearson – clean vocals
- Will Swan – guitar
- Andrew Wells – guitar (on tracks 1–16, 18), clean vocals (on track 5, 8, 15, 17, 18), background vocals (on track 7, 9–14, 16)
- Tim Feerick – bass guitar
- Matt Mingus – drums, percussion

Additional personnel

- Nicholas Marsh – co-songwriter (on "Cream of the Crop")
- Rob Damiani – guest vocals, co-songwriter (on "Synergy")
- Louis Baltazar – guitar (on "Synergy" and "Holy Ghost Spirit")
- Martin Bianchini – guitar (on "Swallowed By Eternity")
- Sergio Medina – guitar (on "Back On Deck")
- Andrea Pacas – mixing assistance
- Jason Turbin – string arrangement (on "Untitled 2")
- Yoed Nir – cello, viola (on "Untitled 2")
- Chen Shenhar – violin (on "Untitled 2")

Production

- Kris Crummett – producer, mixing and mastering engineer
- Dance Gavin Dance – executive producer

== Charts ==
Chart performance for Jackpot Juicer
| Chart (2022) | Peak position |
|---|---|
| Australian Albums (ARIA) | 98 |
| Scottish Albums (Official Charts) | 51 |
| UK Album Sales (OCC) | 35 |
| UK Album Downloads (Official Charts) | 54 |
| UK Physical Albums (OCC) | 38 |
| UK Independent Albums (Official Charts) | 15 |
| UK Rock & Metal Albums (Official Charts) | 3 |
| US Billboard 200 | 8 |
