= Prisoner (Dance Gavin Dance song) =

Single by Dance Gavin Dance

from the album Afterburner
- Released: February 21, 2020
- Recorded: 2019
- Studio: Interlace Audio Recording Studios, Portland, Oregon
- Genre: Post-hardcore; progressive rock; funk rock
- Length: 3:47
- Label: Rise
- Songwriters: J. Mess; M. Mingus; T. Feerick; W. Swan; T. Pearson; S. Medina
- Producers: Kris Crummett; Drew Fulk

Dance Gavin Dance singles chronology
"Blood Wolf" (2019)	"Prisoner" (2020)	"Strawberry's Wake" (2020)

"Prisoner" is a song by American rock band Dance Gavin Dance. It was released to digital download and streaming services as the lead single from their ninth studio album, Afterburner, on February 21, 2020, by Rise Records. The song features an uncredited guest appearance from Royal Coda and Eidola guitarist Sergio Medina.

The song was produced by Kris Crummett while Drew Fulk handled vocal production. Lyrically, the track is about hallucinogens and deals with topics of idolatry while sonically, it has been compared to the band's 2009 studio album, Happiness due to its progressive rock and funk rock nature.

== Background ==
Following extensive touring in support of their eighth studio album Artificial Selection (2018), Dance Gavin Dance began recording sessions for their ninth studio album. Prior to the Artificial Selection Tour, the group held a recording session in January 2019 with producer Kris Crummett at Interlace Audio in Portland, Oregon. The band released the stand-alone single "Head Hunter" on March 22, 2019, and a second stand-alone single "Blood Wolf", on October 11.

On February 20, 2020, Dance Gavin Dance began teasing new music. The following day, the band released "Prisoner", accompanied with its music video, and announced their ninth studio album, Afterburner.

== Composition ==
"Prisoner" is a post-hardcore, progressive rock, and funk rock track with a runtime of 3 minutes and 47 seconds. The instrumentation was written by Dance Gavin Dance with additional guitar performed by Sergio Medina. The track has a BPM of 125 and is in the key of F-sharp minor.

== Music video ==
The music video for "Prisoner" was released on the same day of the single's release, on February 21, 2020. The video depicts a standard one-shot scene of Dance Gavin Dance performing in a color-changing room with palm trees in a psychedelic atmosphere. It was directed by Orie McGinness and Sam Hallen, the latter of which who's directed the videos for "Inspire the Liars" and "Head Hunter". Additionally, the video was produced by Mike Taylor and coordinated by Veronica Zin.

== Credits and personnel ==
Dance Gavin Dance

- Tilian Pearson – clean vocals, backing unclean vocals
- Jon Mess – unclean vocals
- Tim Feerick – bass guitar
- Will Swan – lead guitar, backing vocals
- Matthew Mingus – drums, percussion

Additional personnel

- Sergio Medina – guitar, composer
- Joseph Arrington – composer

Production

- Kris Crummett – producer, mixing engineer, mastering engineer
- Drew Fulk – vocal production
