= The Skeptic (album) =

Studio album by Tilian
- Released: September 28, 2018
- Recorded: 2017–18
- Studio: Interlace Audio Recording Studios (Portland, Oregon)
- Genre: Pop; pop rock; synth-pop
- Length: 37:24
- Label: Future Friends; Rise
- Producer: Kris Crummett

Tilian chronology
Patient (EP) (2017)	The Skeptic (2018)	Factory Reset (2021)

Singles from The Skeptic
- 1. "Cocky" Released: August 17, 2018; 2. "Hold On" Released: August 24, 2018; 3. "Ghost Town" Released: September 21, 2018

The Skeptic is the third solo studio album by American singer-songwriter and former Dance Gavin Dance vocalist Tilian Pearson, released on September 28, 2018, through Future Friends and Rise Records. The album is a follow-up to his second studio album, Perfect Enemy (2015), and is his first solo release on Rise since departing with Vital Records. The album was produced by Kris Crummett, who performed drums and percussion on the record, while Pearson performed guitar, keyboards, and bass guitar.

The lead single, "Cocky", was released on August 17, 2018. Another single, "Hold On", was released on August 24. In support of the album, Tilian embarked on a headlining tour in the United States with Royal Coda, Sunsleep, and Andrés in August and September 2018 and a 2019 summer tour.

== Background ==
Whilst touring with his then band Dance Gavin Dance throughout 2017, Tilian Pearson began writing and recording new material for his third studio album. On June 22, 2017, Tilian premiered a new song, entitled "Lines That Burn". He continued to release a string of solo singles throughout the summer of 2017, including "Take You There", "Patient", and "Wake Up", as well as numerous remixes of his original songs. He released the collaborative single, titled "Bones", with American EDM producer StéLouse, on July 28, 2017. He released the Patient EP on September 1, 2017, on Vital Records.

With Dance Gavin Dance, the group released their seventh studio album, Artificial Selection, on June 8, 2018. It was preceded by the singles "Midnight Crusade", released on April 4, "Son Of Robot", released on May 4, and "Care", released on May 25, 2018. The band toured in support of American post-hardcore band Underoath's headlining North American tour in April and May 2018, followed by a headlining tour with bands I See Stars, ERRA, and Sianvar in June.

== Recording ==
On September 1, 2017, Tilian Pearson confirmed that he would be entering the studio to record new material for his third studio album on September 10, 2017. It was recorded, mixed, and mastered at producer Kris Crummett's recording studio, Interlace Audio, in Portland, Oregon. Crummett has produced Tilian's solo music in the past, however this is the singer's first studio release to be released on Rise Records, apart from his previous record label Vital Records.

== Promotion ==
On June 22, 2018, Tilian announced a solo headlining tour, set to take place from August 23 to September 23, 2018, with support from American rock bands Royal Coda, Andrés, and Sunsleep. Tilian revealed that Dance Gavin Dance drummer Matthew Mingus, Eidola singer and guitarist Andrew Wells, and former A Lot Like Birds guitarist Michael Franzino will be the line-up for his touring band.

The lead single, "Cocky", was announced on August 16, 2018. The following day, "Cocky" was released for digital download and streaming, accompanied with its music video, and the album pre-order bundles for The Skeptic were released.

The second single, "Hold On", was released on August 24, 2018. The music video for "Hold On" premiered on the Rise Records official YouTube channel on August 28.

"Ghost Town" was released as the third single on September 21, 2018.

On May 21, 2019, Tilian announced The Skeptic Tour, with supporting acts I the Mighty's Brent Walsh and The Plot In You's Landon Tewers, scheduled to begin July 26 and conclude August 22, 2019.

The cover of the album features a DeHavilland Beaver, owned by Alaskan company Rust's Flying Service.

== Critical reception ==
The Skeptic was met with mostly positive reviews and acclaim from music critics. Dom Vigil of The Prelude Press spoke about the diversity of the album, stating that "It comes as no surprise that Tilian continues to push himself vocally and break down barriers between genres". He continues, "[...] there’s a little something for everyone on The Skeptic, starting right off the bat with the massive opener, 'Made Of Plastic', which makes the album impossible to ignore. Although fans have come to expect Tilian's signature soaring vocals, they still stun, especially on songs like 'Made Of Plastic', 'Handsome Garbage' and 'Right Side.'" In another positive review, Jeannie Blue of Cryptic Rock praised the album for its eclectic mix of indie pop, EDM, and danceable rock music, rating it 4 out of 5 stars.

== Track listing ==
All track titles taken from MerchNow's website.

No.	Title	Length
1.	"Made of Plastic"	3:56
2.	"Cocky"	3:34
3.	"Gone"	3:52
4.	"Handsome Garbage"	3:36
5.	"Hold on"	3:09
6.	"Blame It on Rock and Roll"	3:46
7.	"Let Her Go"	3:53
8.	"Drunken Conversations"	3:50
9.	"Right Side"	3:50
10.	"Ghost Town"	4:03
Total length:		37:24

== Credits and personnel ==
Musicians

- Tilian Pearson - vocals, guitar, bass guitar, keyboards
- Kris Crummett - drums, percussion, backing vocals

Production

- Kris Crummett - producer, mixing engineer, mastering engineer

Additional personnel

- Jordan Palmer - composer, lyricist (on "Cocky")

== Chart performance ==
In the United States, The Skeptic debuted at No. 21 on the Digital Albums Chart, No. 13 on the Current Rock Albums chart, No. 9 on the Top Independent Albums chart, No. 6 on the Current Alternative Albums chart and charted atop the Alternative New Artist Albums chart.
