= Factory Reset (album) =

Studio album by Tilian
- Released: April 23, 2021
- Recorded: 2020
- Studio: Home recording studio, Los Angeles; Interlace Audio, Portland
- Genre: Pop rock; electropop; progressive rock; electronic rock
- Length: 35:16
- Label: Future Friends; Rise
- Producer: Tilian

Tilian chronology
The Skeptic (2018)	Factory Reset (2021)	Vertigo (2025)

Singles from Factory Reset
- 1. "Dose" Released: December 11, 2020; 2. "Anthem" Released: February 26, 2021; 3. "Is Anarchy a Good Hobby?" Released: March 26, 2021; 4. "Caught In the Carousel" Released: April 21, 2021

Factory Reset is the fourth studio album by American singer-songwriter and musician Tilian, released on April 23, 2021, through Future Friends and Rise Records. The album serves as a follow-up to his third studio album, The Skeptic (2018). Similar to The Skeptic, the album was produced by Kris Crummett, who also performed drums, while Tilian performed guitar, bass, keyboards, synthesizers, and handled additional production. It was writhen and recorded at the musician's home recording studio in Los Angeles during the COVID-19 pandemic, while engineering was handled at Crummett's Interlace Audio Studio in Portland, Oregon. The album shares the same pop rock and electro-pop musical styles from its predecessor while including elements of progressive rock, electronic rock, trap, and dancehall.

The album's lead single "Dose" was released on December 11, 2020. "Anthem" was released as the second single on February 26, 2021. The third and fourth singles, "Is Anarchy A Good Hobby?" and "Caught In the Carousel", were each released in March and April, respectively. A remix of "Breathe" by Australian producer and DJ Mars Monero was released on February 11, 2022. A headlining US tour was scheduled to take place in February and March 2022, however never transpired due to the COVID-19 pandemic and pursuing other musical endeavors.

== Background ==
In August 2018, Tilian announced his third studio album, The Skeptic, which was released the following month on Rise Records, his first release on the label after parting ways with independent record label Vital Recordings. The album debuted at No. 21 on the Digital Albums Chart, No. 13 on the Current Rock Albums chart, No. 9 on the Top Independent Albums chart, No. 6 on the Current Alternative Albums chart and charted atop the Alternative New Artist Albums chart. In support of the album, he toured on a headlining US tour from August 23 to September 23, 2018 with support from Royal Coda, Andrés, and Sunsleep. The following year, he embarked on The Skeptic Tour from July 26 to August 22, 2019, in North America, with support from Landon Tewers of The Plot In You, Brent Walsh of I the Mighty, and RVLS.

On August 9, 2019, he released the electro-pop song "Half". Tilian also featured on American rock project Bilmuri's cover of Halsey's "Graveyard".

== Recording ==
In an interview with Rock Sound, Tilian expressed how the COVID-19 pandemic affected the writing process for his fourth solo studio album and inspired him to begin sessions earlier than intended. "I was going to do it later, but I'm just [writing the album] now. I have full capabilities here at home just to make an album. I'm seeing that you can use text, e-mail, and Zoom, or whatever it may be [...] I think I could do a full album without leaving." In another interview, Tilian said that songs for the album "started coming together as complete ideas" in July and August while quarantining due to the COVID-19 pandemic.

The album was produced, mixed, and mastered by longtime collaborator Kris Crummett, who also performed and recorded drums and percussion. Pearson performed vocals, guitar, bass, keyboards, and synthesizers on the album, as well as additional programming and production. Polyphia guitarist Tim Henson performed guitar parts and served as producer for the album's ninth track "Imagination".

== Promotion ==
On December 11, 2020, the lead single, "Dose", was released. The second single, "Anthem", was released on February 26, 2021, accompanied with its music video, directed by Dillon Novak. "Is Anarchy a Good Hobby?" was released as the third single on March 26, 2021, along with its music video. Another song, "Caught in the Carousel", was released to streaming platforms on April 21.

A remix of the interlude track "Breathe" done by Australian DJ and record producer Mars Monero was released on February 11, 2022.

=== Tour ===
The Factory Reset Tour was announced on August 24, 2021. Originally, the 22-date tour was scheduled to begin on February 25, 2022 and conclude on March 26, 2022 with support from Royal Coda, Tillie, and Moxy. On January 28, the tour was postponed to November 2022, however never transpired.

== Sound and musical influence ==
Factory Reset has been described as pop, pop rock, electronic rock, progressive rock, electro-pop, hip hop, and psychedelic pop.

== Track listing ==
All tracks are written by Tilian Pearson, except where noted.

Factory Reset track listing
No.	Title	Writer(s)	Length
1.	"Holy Water"		4:37
2.	"Dose"		3:55
3.	"Caught in the Carousel"		2:58
4.	"Anthem"		2:50
5.	"Breathe"		1:32
6.	"All I Crave Is Peace"		4:20
7.	"Is Anarchy a Good Hobby?"		3:25
8.	"Factory Reset"	Pearson; Matt Malpass	2:10
9.	"Imagination" (featuring Tim Henson)	Pearson; Tim Henson	2:37
10.	"Act Out"	Pearson; Colin Brittain	3:14
11.	"Hands Around My Throat"		3:38
Total length:			35:16

== Personnel ==
Credits adapted from the album's liner notes.

- Tilian Pearson – vocals, production, instrumentation,
- Kris Crummett – drums, drum recording, mixing, mastering, audio engineer, programming, drums, percussion
- Louie Baltazar – lead guitar on "All I Crave Is Peace"
- Tim Feerick – recording on "All I Crave Is Peace"
- Matt Malpass – production on "Factory Reset"
- Tim Henson – guitar and production on "Factory Reset"
- Natasha Chomko – cover artwork
- Chris Rubey – album layout, design
- Kevin Moore – album layout, design
