= Afterburner (Dance Gavin Dance album) =

Studio album by Dance Gavin Dance
- Released: April 24, 2020
- Recorded: August–October 2019
- Studios: Interlace Audio, Portland, Oregon
- Genres: Post-hardcore; experimental rock; math rock; progressive rock; alternative rock; funk rock
- Length: 48:38
- Label: Rise
- Producers: Kris Crummett; Drew Fulk

Dance Gavin Dance chronology
Artificial Selection (2018)	Afterburner (2020)	Tree City Sessions 2 (2020)

Singles from Afterburner
- 1. "Prisoner" Released: February 21, 2020; 2. "Strawberry's Wake" Released: March 12, 2020; 3. "Lyrics Lie" Released: April 9, 2020; 4. "Three Wishes" Released: April 16, 2020; 5. "One In A Million" Released: July 14, 2020

Afterburner is the ninth full-length studio album by American rock band Dance Gavin Dance. Released on April 24, 2020, on Rise Records, the album serves as a follow-up to the group's eighth studio album, Artificial Selection (2018). Recording sessions for the album took place over a three-month period between August and October 2019 with producer Kris Crummett at Interlace Audio in Portland, Oregon, while the vocals were recorded with producer Drew Fulk in Los Angeles, California. The album is considered a musical progression for the band, as the group experimented with funk, Latin, rap, and metalcore which accompanied their post-hardcore and experimental rock styles. It is the group's final studio album to be released during bass guitarist Tim Feerick's lifetime before his death in April 2022.

In support of the album, the band released the lead single, "Prisoner", on February 21, 2020. The second single, "Strawberry's Wake", was released on March 12. Two more singles, "Lyrics Lie" and "Three Wishes," were released in April. The album debuted at number 14 on the US Billboard 200, with 24,000 copies sold in its first week. Originally, the group announced a 2020 spring tour in support of the album to take place in North America and Europe, but it was postponed due to the COVID-19 pandemic. They embarked on the Afterburner Tour which took place in September and October 2021 with support from Polyphia, Veil of Maya, Eidola and Wolf & Bear. An instrumental version of the album was released to digital and streaming services on December 25, 2021.

== Background ==
Dance Gavin Dance released their eighth studio album, Artificial Selection, on June 8, 2018, via Rise Records. Promotion for the album included a spring 2019 tour with support from Periphery, Don Broco, Hail the Sun, Covet, and Thousand Below. Dance Gavin Dance also toured in support of Underoath on their fall 2018 headlining tour, and headlined the inaugural Swanfest music festival in San Francisco.

On March 22, 2019, the band released "Head Hunter", a stand-alone single, accompanied with its music video. Another single, "Blood Wolf", was released on October 11, along with its music video. In October 2019, the band's vocalist Tilian Pearson confirmed that these two singles will not appear on the band's ninth studio album, nor are they indicative of the album's sound.

On May 31, 2019, the band released an instrumental version of Artificial Selection. They began a pattern of releasing an instrumental version of their studio albums on the last Friday of every month since, with Mothership, being released on June 28 and so forth, concluding with Downtown Battle Mountain on December 27, 2019. On August 30, 2019, the band released a remastered version of their 2013 album Acceptance Speech, accompanied with the instrumental version.

== Recording ==
In January 2019, Dance Gavin Dance lead guitarist Will Swan revealed on Twitter that he was recording new material in Portland, Oregon, at Kris Crummett's recording studio, Interlace Audio. In July 2019, Tilian Pearson revealed he was writing for the band's upcoming ninth studio album. Crummett tracked guitar with Will Swan and Secret Band guitarist Martin Bianchini in September.

In an October 2019 interview, drummer Matthew Mingus disclosed that the new album will be "very technical" and that fifteen songs were recorded. In November, Pearson confirmed he had completed recording vocals for the album with record producer Drew Fulk in Los Angeles, California. Mixing for the album was completed by Kris Crummett in December 2019.

The album features a list of guest appearances, including Strawberry Girls guitarist Zachary Garren, Eidola vocalist and guitarist Andrew Wells, Veil of Maya guitarist Marc Okubo, Secret Band guitarist Martin Bianchini, Royal Coda guitarist Sergio Medina, and former Attack Attack! vocalist Johnny Franck (credited as his current band, Bilmuri). The album features two guest vocal appearances, including Wells appearing on "Lyrics Lie" and "Nothing Shameful" and Franck appearing on "Into the Sunset". Royal Coda drummer, and former A Lot Like Birds drummer, Joseph Arrington, is credited as a co-writer on "Prisoner".

== Musical style and composition ==
Afterburner has been labeled post-hardcore, progressive rock, pop rock, funk, Latin rock and metalcore, .

== Artwork and album title ==
The album artwork for Afterburner was illustrated by Swedish artist Mattias Adolfsson, who previously created the artwork for every Dance Gavin Dance album since the band's debut studio album, Downtown Battle Mountain (2007). The album cover depicts a robot minotaur figure, named Gavin Afterburner, in the center with creatures seemingly cowering around the figure whilst the environment around them is engulfed in flames. In an interview with Rock Sound, the band expressed that they had received the artwork prior to writing sessions so they could create a more cohesive album, similar to their past two studio albums. A mural of the album cover was painted by Duce One on the side of the Flame Club in Sacramento, California in February 2020. On March 18, 2020, Jon Mess shared the reference painting for the album cover art.

The album's title "afterburner" itself has several different meanings and ideologies. An afterburn, the psychological term, is defined as the period of time before a past event is assimilated. The band's lore within their album covers tell a universal story which continues to be portrayed on this album's cover and is considered a continuation of the album cover for Artificial Selection.

== Release ==
The band announced Afterburner, its track listing, album cover art and release date along with pre-order bundles on February 21, 2020. The album was released to digital download and streaming platforms on April 24, 2020, through Rise Records. Due to complications related to the COVID-19 pandemic, physical editions of the album were postponed to July 10, 2020. The Target special deluxe edition features a second disc containing an instrumental version of the album.

=== Singles ===
On February 21, 2020, Dance Gavin Dance released the album's lead single "Prisoner" accompanied with its music video.

On March 12, "Strawberry's Wake" was released as the second single, along with its music video.

On April 9, "Lyrics Lie" was released as the album's third single, along with a music video. The track features uncredited background vocals from Eidola guitarist and vocalist Andrew Wells. The video for the song is a time lapse of artist Duce One painting the mural of the album cover on the side of The Flame Club in Sacramento, California.

On April 16, the fourth single, "Three Wishes", was released. The music video for "Three Wishes" features a montage of fan submitted videos of themselves being cleanly in abstract and creative ways. The video also features members of the band.

On July 14, 2020, the group premiered an animated music video for the song "One In A Million".

== Tour ==
On February 21, 2021, the band announced the postponed tour dates for the Afterburner Tour, scheduled to span from September 7 to October 20, 2021, with Polyphia, Veil of Maya, Eidola and Wolf & Bear. Originally, the group had announced a spring tour that would span from March 12 to April 25, 2020, however was postponed due to the COVID-19 pandemic. A string of tour dates in the US with Crown the Empire and Bilmuri, Europe and the UK, in May 2020 were also cancelled due to the pandemic.

The band performed a live concert on Twitch to promote the release of Afterburner on July 17, 2020. On December 19, 2020, they broadcast Tree City Sessions 2, a fan-voted concert-streaming event that was filmed on the Tower Bridge in Sacramento, California in November 2020.

== Reception ==
Professional ratings
Review scores
Source	Rating
Discovered Magazine	9/10
Distorted Sound	9/10
Kill Your Stereo	95/100
New Transcendence	8/10
Wall of Sound	9/10

Afterburner was released to critical acclaim. Alex Sievers of Kill Your Stereo wrote that the album is "intricate, catchy, emotional and deceptively complex" while being the band's most consistent album to date. "It is simultaneously the most Dance Gavin Dance record that you could expect these days, whilst containing plenty of fresh ideas and different genre influences that tastefully boost their progressive post-hardcore sound with funk, rap, Latin, and pop vibes." Wall of Sound gave a positive review of the album, saying what "they’ve delivered is an innovative album that sounds like classic DGD and yet not at all". Andy Katz of Scene Daddy went so far as to say that "this is the best record of Dance Gavin Dance’s career".

Afterburner was not without some criticism, even within positive reviews. Connor Welsh of New Transcendence wrote "while it might not have the replay value or nostalgic appeal some of their previous records have, Afterburner sees Dance Gavin Dance working cohesively—a creative unit with all cylinders firing—and creating a strong, solid—albeit safe—contribution to their airtight discography."

== Track listing ==
All tracks are written by Will Swan, Tilian Pearson, Jon Mess, Tim Feerick, and Matt Mingus.

Afterburner track listing
No.	Title	Length
1.	"Prisoner"	3:46
2.	"Lyrics Lie"	3:56
3.	"Calentamiento Global"	3:58
4.	"Three Wishes"	3:28
5.	"One in a Million"	3:41
6.	"Parody Catharsis"	3:41
7.	"Strawberry's Wake"	3:37
8.	"Born to Fail"	3:28
9.	"Parallels"	3:36
10.	"Night Sway"	2:52
11.	"Say Hi"	3:51
12.	"Nothing Shameful" (featuring Andrew Wells)	4:01
13.	"Into the Sunset" (featuring Bilmuri)	4:30
Total length:		48:38

== Credits and personnel ==
Dance Gavin Dance

- Tilian Pearson – clean vocals
- Jon Mess – unclean vocals
- Will Swan – lead guitar
- Tim Feerick – bass guitar
- Matthew Mingus – drums, percussion

Additional personnel

- Martin Bianchini – guitar (on track 11)
- Marc Okubo – guitar (on track 2)
- Zachary Garren – guitar (on track 6)
- Sergio Medina – additional guitar (on track 1, 8, 12)
- Andrew Wells – guitar (on track 10), guest vocals (on track 2, 12), backing vocals
- Johnny Franck (Bilmuri) – guest vocals (on track 13)
- Joseph Arrington – composer (on track 1, 8)

Production

- Kris Crummett – producer, mixing engineer, mastering engineer
- Drew Fulk – vocal producer

== Charts ==
=== Weekly charts ===
Chart (2020)	Peak position
Australian Albums (ARIA)	86
UK Rock & Metal Albums (OCC)	17
US Billboard 200	14
US Top Rock Albums (Billboard)	1

=== Year-end charts ===
Chart (2020)	Position
US Top Rock Albums (Billboard)	87
