= Synergy (song) =

Single by Dance Gavin Dance featuring Rob Damiani

from the album Jackpot Juicer
- Released: March 24, 2022
- Recorded: June 2021
- Studio: Interlace Audio Recording Studios (Portland, Oregon)
- Genre: Funk rock; rap rock; post-hardcore
- Length: 3:17
- Label: Rise Records
- Songwriters: Tilian Pearson; Will Swan; Louie Baltazar; Andrew Wells; Timothy Feerick; Matthew Mingus; Jonathon Mess; Robert Damiani
- Producer: Kris Crummett

Dance Gavin Dance singles chronology
"Strawberry's Wake" (2020)	"Synergy" (2022)	"Pop Off!" (2022)

"Synergy" is a song by American rock band Dance Gavin Dance. It was released as the lead single from their tenth studio album, Jackpot Juicer, to digital and streaming platforms on March 24, 2022, on Rise Records. It was written by the band with additional guitar parts from Louie Baltazar of American post-hardcore band Wolf & Bear and features guest vocals from Rob Damiani of English rock band Don Broco. It is the band's first release to feature Andrew Wells of American post-hardcore band Eidola as an official member since joining as a touring guitarist in 2015 and is their final song to be released before Tim Feerick's death.

== Background and recording ==
Prior to the band's Afterburner Tour in September and October 2021, Dance Gavin Dance began recording material for their follow-up to Afterburner (2020), in April. On June 19, 2021, lead vocalist Tilian Pearson shared a behind-the-scenes studio preview of "Synergy" at producer Kris Crummett's studio in Portland, Oregon. The song features a verse from Rob Damiani of English rock band Don Broco and additional guitar parts from Louis Baltazar of the post-hardcore band Wolf & Bear. Speaking on the song, drummer Matthew Mingus said "This song features all the components that are [required] for a tasty DGD treat – epic technical guitars, catchy melodies and groovy drum parts."

== Music video ==
The music video for "Synergy" premiered on March 24, 2022. It was directed by Samuel Halleen, who has directed Dance Gavin Dance music videos in the past, produced by Zoe Dinerstein, and features graphic designs from longtime collaborator John Howe, who has contributed to past music videos as well. In the video, Jon Mess plays the character the Rat King, a rat exterminator who appears at a rundown motel in the middle of nowhere and experiences a run in with supernatural forces. The video is the first of a series of music videos that tell a greater narrative.

== Artwork ==
The artwork for the single cover was illustrated by Mattias Adolfsson, who has created every Dance Gavin Dance album cover since their debut studio album, Downtown Battle Mountain (2007).

== Live performances ==
"Synergy" was debuted during the band's performance at the second inaugural SwanFest on April 23, 2022, at Heart Health Park in Sacramento, California and was also performed on the subsequent US spring tour in April and May 2022.

== Credits and personnel ==
Dance Gavin Dance

- Vocals – Tilian Pearson, Jon Mess, Rob Damiani, Andrew Wells
- Guitar – Will Swan, Andrew Wells, Louie Baltazar
- Bass – Timothy Feerick
- Drums – Matthew Mingus

Production

- Producer – Kris Crummett
- Sound Engineer – Kris Crummett
- Studio – Interlace Audio
