= Acceptance Speech =

Acceptance Speech may refer to:

- Acceptance Speech, a 2007 album by Hip Hop Pantsula
- Acceptance Speech (album), a 2013 album by Dance Gavin Dance
- Public speaking
