= Perfect Enemy =

Perfect Enemy may refer to:

- "Perfect Enemy" (song), 2005 song by Russian musical group t.A.T.u.
- Perfect Enemy (album), 2015 album by American singer-songwriter Tilian Pearson
- A Perfect Enemy, 2020 film
