= Tilian Pearson =

American singer-songwriter

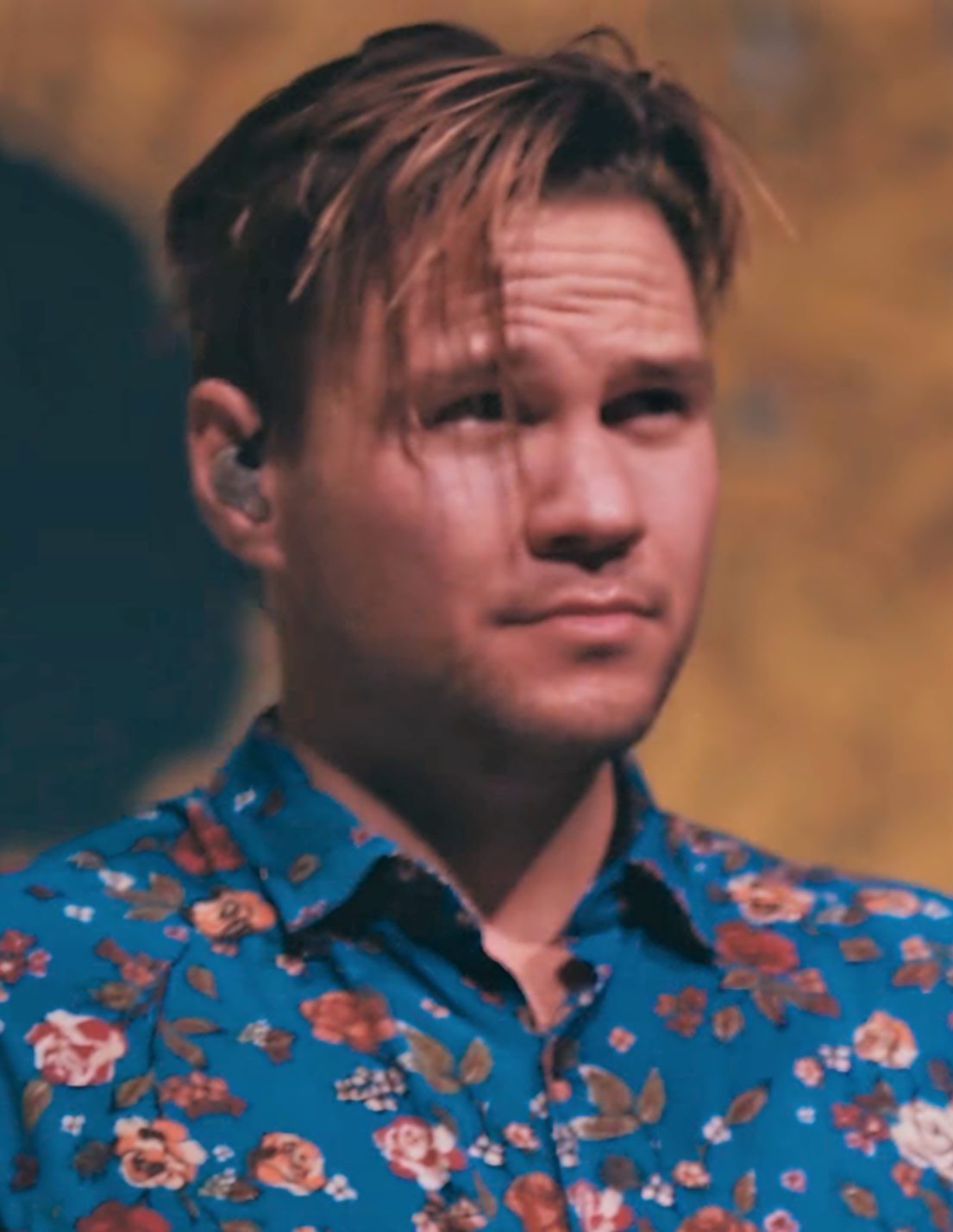
- Tilian performing with Dance Gavin Dance in December 2017.

Background information
- Born: Tilian Pearson; July 12, 1987 (age 39)
- Origin: Clearwater, Florida, U.S.
- Genres: Progressive rock; pop rock; post-hardcore; djent; electronic rock; electronica
- Occupations: Singer; songwriter; musician; record producer
- Instruments: Vocals; guitar; bass; piano
- Years active: 2007–present
- Labels: Rise; Vital
- Member of: Dead Air Divine
- Formerly of: Tides of Man; Dance Gavin Dance

Tilian Pearson (born July 12, 1987), also known mononymously as Tilian, is an American singer-songwriter, musician and record producer born in Clearwater, Florida. He is the vocalist of the supergroup Dead Air Divine. From 2012 to 2024, he was the clean vocalist for American post-hardcore band Dance Gavin Dance. Pearson began his music career as the lead vocalist and guitarist in the progressive rock band Tides of Man, releasing an extended play and two albums before leaving in 2010.

After parting ways with Tides of Man, Pearson briefly joined the American rock bands Saosin and Emarosa following the departure of their respective vocalists, however never released any material with the groups. In August 2012, he joined Dance Gavin Dance, replacing Jonny Craig, and released the album Acceptance Speech (2013). Two years later, the band released Instant Gratification, to critical acclaim and became their first top-forty US Billboard 200 album. In 2016, they released the live album Tree City Sessions and their seventh album, Mothership, the latter charting at number 13 on the Billboard 200. The band released their eighth album, Artificial Selection (2018), which was followed by their ninth album, Afterburner (2020), each peaking at numbers 15 and 14 in the US, respectively. On June 1, 2022, Pearson was accused of sexual assault involving multiple women through anonymous Reddit posts. He briefly left Dance Gavin Dance in 2022, yet returned the following year, later permanently parting ways in April 2024.

As a solo musician, Tilian has released four studio albums and two extended plays. His first two albums, Material Me (2013) and Perfect Enemy (2015), were released on the independent record label Vital Recordings. His third and fourth albums, The Skeptic (2018) and Factory Reset (2021), were released on Rise Records. He has appeared on numerous other musical groups and artists' songs including Our Last Night's 2018 cover of "Better Now" by Post Malone, Don Broco's 2019 single "Action" alongside Tyler Carter, Taka Moriuchi, and Caleb Shomo, and Adventure Club's 2021 single "Drive".

== Career ==
=== 2007–2012: Career beginnings: Tides of Man, Saosin, and Emarosa ===
==== Tides of Man ====
In 2007, Pearson formed progressive rock band Tides of Man consisting of lead guitarist Spencer Gill, rhythm guitarist Adam Sene, bass guitarist Alan Jaye, and percussionist Josh Gould, at the time. The band recorded their debut full-length album titled Empire Theory throughout September 2008 with producer Matt Malpass and was released through Rise Records on August 4, 2009. They also released their second album, Dreamhouse, in 2010. He announced his departure from the band on December 20, 2010, through a message on Myspace. Since Pearson's departure, Tides of Man has become an instrumental and progressive rock band consisting of little-to-no vocal use in their recent material.

==== Saosin ====
Following the announcement of Pearson's departure from Tides of Man in December 2010, the singer revealed that he was working on material with American post-hardcore band Saosin. The band's members Alex Rodriguez and Beau Burchell reached out to Pearson asking him to record a demo to which he agreed and recorded "Promises". In January 2011, Pearson flew to California for rehearsals and decided to record more material with Saosin. He was subsequently offered to record vocals for their third album, however Pearson was limited to recording with the group. The album with Pearson never came to fruition due to his commitments to touring with Emarosa and forming his band Archives. Saosin went on to go on an indefinite hiatus, later rejoining with original lead vocalist Anthony Green. In a 2013 interview, Pearson explained why his relationship with Saosin fell through. "They flew me out to California and I did a bunch of practices and recorded five demos. A few months later I came back and did some writing sessions. Time just stretched and stretched after that. It was a complete maybe for almost two years. They would send me demos every few months. During this span I also toured with Emarosa and did a couple months of writing and recording demos with them. It wasn't until I was doing the music video for “Up In the Air” from my solo project when Saosin told me they were probably going to do something instrumental."

==== Emarosa ====
In April 2011, American post-hardcore band Emarosa announced the departure of their lead vocalist Jonny Craig. Pearson, who had just left his band Tides of Man, was offered to temporarily tour with the group for the remainder of their 2011 tour dates. During his time with Emarosa, Pearson recorded multiple demos with the band. In February 2012, it was revealed that Pearson was no longer associated with Emarosa.

=== 2012–2024: Dance Gavin Dance ===
==== Acceptance Speech and Instant Gratification ====
Following the departure of Jonny Craig on August 21, 2012, it was rumored that Pearson would be serving as a touring member to pursue clean vocal duties for Dance Gavin Dance. Despite the fact that Pearson was in the midst of recording his full-length album Material Me (2013), he subsequently became a permanent member. Pearson recorded vocals for the band's fifth album, Acceptance Speech, which was released on October 8, 2013, on Rise Records, a record label he was previously signed to with his former group Tides of Man. Acceptance Speech received mixed to positive reviews from critics upon its release. The band embarked on The Acceptance Speech Tour on April 16 in Seattle, Washington, and concluded on May 17, 2014, in Denver, Colorado. On September 14, 2014, it was announced that the band was to headline the annual Rise Records tour beginning on November 16 in Seattle. The tour concluded in Santa Cruz, California, on December 7, 2014, with supporting acts SECRETS, Alive Like Me, and Defeat The Low.

On February 9, 2015, it was announced that Dance Gavin Dance were releasing their sixth album, Instant Gratification on April 14, 2015 through Rise Records, being the second album featuring Pearson on vocals. "On the Run" was released as the lead single on February 12, 2015, and the second single, "We Own the Night", was released on March 13, 2015. In support of the album, the band embarked on the Instant Gratification Tour and served as supporting acts on the Take Action! Tour with metalcore band Memphis May Fire, Palisades, and Crown the Empire. Tilian toured with Dance Gavin Dance throughout November and December 2015 on the 10 year anniversary tour with supporting acts Slaves, A Lot Like Birds, Dayshell, and Strawberry Girls. Throughout the tour, Tilian switched out as lead vocalist with the band's former vocalists Jonny Craig and Kurt Travis. The group, as well as Craig and Travis, embarked on the second leg of the 10th-anniversary tour in Europe in November 2016.

==== Tree City Sessions and Mothership ====
The band announced a string of international tour dates for 2016, including their US fall tour from September 22 to October 27 and a European tour from November 3 to November 16. They released the live album, Tree City Sessions, on May 13, 2016. The band released their seventh album, Mothership, on October 7, 2016, which charted at number 13 on the US Billboard 200. The lead single, "Chucky Vs. the Giant Tortoise", was released on August 18, 2016, for digital download and streaming. In 2017, the group embarked on a co-headlining North American tour with progressive rock band CHON in February and March 2017. They released a cover of the Bruno Mars single "That's What I Like" on June 1, 2017, as part of Punk Goes Pop Vol. 7. They released a stand-alone single, "Summertime Gladness", on June 15. They toured on the Journey's Right Foot Stage from May to August 2017 on the Vans Warped Tour. This was the first Warped Tour in which Pearson toured as a member in Dance Gavin Dance.

==== Artificial Selection, Afterburner, Jackpot Juicer and hiatus ====
On March 23, 2018, the band announced Artificial Selection, revealing the album cover art and track listing. The album, which was released on June 8, 2018, is the fourth consecutive studio album and fifth release overall to feature Pearson on vocals, making him the longest-running vocalist in the band. The band released the single "Midnight Crusade", along with its music video, on April 4, 2018. Another single, "Son of Robot", was released on May 4, 2018. Two more singles, "Care" and "Count Bassy", were released on May 25 and June 5, 2018, respectively. In support of the album, the band toured on American post-hardcore band Underoath's No Fix Tour from April 20 to May 26, 2018. A headlining tour took place from May 26 to June 21, with support from I See Stars, ERRA, and Sianvar. The band toured in support of Underoath's North American Erase Me tour from November 2 to December 14, 2018, with The Plot In You and Crown the Empire. The band announced a 2019 Australian Tour, which spanned from February 27 to March 5, 2019. On November 9, Dance Gavin Dance announced its first annual SwanFest, which took place on March 30, 2019, in Anaheim, California. Another North American headliner, The Artificial Selection Tour, spanned from March 31 to May 12, 2019. On March 22, 2019, the band released the song "Head Hunter". Another song, "Blood Wolf", was released on October 11, 2019.

On November 12, 2019, the group announced their 2020 spring tour scheduled to take place from March 12 to April 25, 2020. This tour was later postponed due to the 2019-20 coronavirus outbreak and was later rescheduled as the Afterburner Tour, which took place in September and October 2021. In February 2020, the band announced their ninth album, Afterburner, and released its lead single "Prisoner", along with its accompanying music video. Afterburner serves as Pearson's fifth consecutive album with the group.

In December 2020, the group announced Tree City Sessions 2, which was released to digital download and streaming platforms on December 25. The live album was accompanied with a concert streaming event where the group performed a fan voted setlist on the Tower Bridge in Sacramento, California, which was broadcast on December 19.

On March 24, 2022, the band released the single "Synergy". Their tenth full-length album, Jackpot Juicer, was released on July 29, 2022, and was supported by a spring tour in April and May, a summer tour with Coheed & Cambria in July and August, and a run of UK and European concerts in September 2022 and March 2023.

On June 3, 2022, the band announced lead vocalist Tilian Pearson will be "stepping away to seek professional help" following multiple sexual assault allegations made against him. He returned to the band in November.

In April 2024, Dance Gavin Dance and Tilian parted ways permanently.

=== 2013–present: Solo career ===
==== Material Me and Perfect Enemy ====
Tilian Pearson released his debut full-length album, Material Me, on March 18, 2013, through Vital Records. He later released his solo extended play, Future Friends, on December 16, 2014, through Vital Records. On June 29, 2015, Pearson announced that he would be entering the studio and recording new material with producer Kris Crummett on September 1. Tilian began recording vocals for the album on September 9. Two weeks later, Pearson finished recording the album. He released his single "Tug Of War" along with its music video on October 16, 2015.

On October 29, 2015, he announced his second album Perfect Enemy, which was released on November 27, 2015, through Vital Records. In support of the album, he announced his headlining solo tour with supporting act Myke Terry (formerly of metalcore band Bury Your Dead). The tour took place from January 28 to February 5, 2016. On August 21, 2015, rock band Slaves released their second album, Routine Breathing, which consists of the song "Winter Everywhere", featuring a guest vocal appearance from Pearson.

He released his collaborative single, "Back to Life", with singer Jonny Craig, on April 18, 2016. As a solo artist, Pearson toured as a co-headliner on a U.S. tour with Jonny Craig and Kurt Travis spanning from April 15 to May 22, 2016.

==== The Skeptic ====
On June 22, 2017, Tilian premiered the song "Lines That Burn", which originally was planned to be the lead single from his upcoming third solo album. Another new single, "Wake Up", was released on July 14. Tilian featured on the StéLouse single "Bones", which was released on July 28, 2017. He released another solo single, entitled "Patient", and announced the Patient EP on August 4, 2017.

Tilian confirmed on Twitter that he would be recording his third album beginning September 10 and recording his fourth album with Dance Gavin Dance beginning October 14.

On August 29, 2017, American post-hardcore band I the Mighty released the single "Silver Tongues", accompanied with a music video, featuring Tilian on vocals.

On June 22, 2018, Tilian announced a solo headlining tour, which took place from August 23 to September 23, 2018, with support from American rock bands Royal Coda and Sunsleep. Tilian revealed that Dance Gavin Dance drummer Matthew Mingus, Eidola singer and guitarist Andrew Wells, and former A Lot Like Birds guitarist Michael Franzino will be the line-up for his touring band.

On July 10, 2018, American rock band Our Last Night released a cover of Post Malone's 2018 single "Better Now", featuring Tilian and drummer Luke Holland.

On August 16, 2018, Tilian announced his third album The Skeptic, with a scheduled release date of September 28, 2018. The lead single, "Cocky", was released on August 17. In the United States, The Skeptic debuted at No. 21 on the Digital Albums Chart, No. 13 on the Current Rock Albums chart, No. 9 on the Top Independent Albums chart, No. 6 on the Current Alternative Albums chart and charted atop the Alternative New Artist Albums chart. He embarked on The Skeptic US tour, from July 26 to August 22, 2019, with support from Landon Tewers of The Plot In You, Brent Walsh of I the Mighty and RVLS.

On August 9, 2019, he released the single "Half". The following year, he collaborated on former Attack Attack! guitarist and singer Johnny Franck's solo project Bilmuri's song "THEMURIWITHHUMANHAIR" and his cover of "Graveyard" by Halsey.

==== Factory Reset ====
After sessions for his fourth album took place throughout the summer in his home recording studio, Tilian released the lead single "Dose" on December 11, 2020. Another song, "Anthem", was released accompanied by its music video on February 27, 2021. Tilian released "Is Anarchy a Good Hobby?", the third single from the album, on March 26, along with its music video. Factory Reset was officially announced on March 23, and was released on April 23, 2021. On August 24, he announced the Factory Reset Tour. Originally, the 22-date tour was planned to span from February 25 to March 26, 2022, with support from Royal Coda, Tillie, and Moxy. However, on January 28, the tour was postponed to November 2022 and has since been postponed indefinitely.

== Sexual assault allegations ==
On June 1, 2022, Pearson was accused of sexual assault involving a fan in a Reddit post. Due to the allegations, he indefinitely left the band to seek "rehabilitation" and later rejoined in November 2022. Tilian admitted to the encounters, yet denied they were non-consensual in a Reddit post.

== Musical style ==
Tilian's solo music has been often labeled as pop rock, indie pop, folk-pop, dance-pop and electropop. On his debut album, Material Me, he focused the production more towards a synth-pop driven style with elements of R&B, rock and soul. His follow-up, Perfect Enemy (2015), consists of a more folk and pop sound. His 2018 album, The Skeptic has been labeled as a pop rock, pop and synth-pop record while exploring more aggressive elements of rock such as post-hardcore such as on the track "Handsome Garbage". and electro on the songs "Drunken Conversation" and "Let Her Go".

As a member of Tides of Man, the band pursued post-hardcore with elements of experimental rock, psychedelic rock and progressive rock. After leaving the band, he joined Dance Gavin Dance, focusing on a more aggressive style of post-hardcore, with influences of jazz, funk rock, math rock, and emo. In a 2019 interview with Alternative Press, Pearson revealed that upon joining Dance Gavin Dance, his melodies and lyricism were both heavily inspired by his former band Tides of Man on Acceptance Speech (2013), while claiming he cemented his style on Instant Gratification (2015).

== Discography ==
=== Solo ===
Studio albums

- Material Me (Vital, 2013)
- Perfect Enemy (Vital, 2015)
- The Skeptic (Rise, 2018)
- Factory Reset (Rise, 2021)
- Vertigo (Rise, 2025)

Extended plays

- Future Friends (Vital, 2014)
- Patient (Vital, 2017)

=== with Dance Gavin Dance ===
Studio albums

- Acceptance Speech (Rise, 2013)
- Instant Gratification (Rise, 2015)
- Mothership (Rise, 2016)
- Artificial Selection (Rise, 2018)
- Afterburner (Rise, 2020)
- Jackpot Juicer (Rise, 2022)

Live albums

- Tree City Sessions (Rise, 2016)
- Tree City Sessions 2 (Rise, 2020)

Non-album singles

- Summertime Gladness / Pussy Vultures 7-inch (Rise, 2017)
- "Head Hunter" (Rise, 2019)
- "Blood Wolf" (Rise, 2019)
- "The Ghost of Billy Royalton" (Rise, 2023)
- "War Machine" (Rise, 2023)

=== with Tides of Man ===
Studio albums

- Empire Theory (Rise, 2009)
- Dreamhouse (Rise, 2010)

Extended plays

- Tides of Man (EP) (Rise, 2008)

=== with Emarosa ===
Unreleased demo recordings

- "Mamba"
- "Supercow"
- "Moonraker"
- "Forest Whimsical"

=== with Saosin ===
Unreleased demo recordings

- "Exfoliator"
- "Promises"
- "Change"

=== with Archives ===
Unreleased demo recordings

- "Joy" (Later recorded as "From The Shadows Where I'm Low" by Night Verses on Out of the Sky EP)
- "Jefferson" (Later recorded as "I've Lost My Way Back Down" by Night Verses on Out of the Sky EP)

=== Singles ===
List of singles
Title	Year	Album
"Tug of War"	2015	Perfect Enemy
"All I Ever Do"	2015	Perfect Enemy
"Dreaming"	2015	Perfect Enemy
"Satellite"	2015	Perfect Enemy
"Hold Me Down"	2016	Perfect Enemy
"Cocky"	2018	The Skeptic
"Hold On"	2018	The Skeptic
"Ghost Town"	2018	The Skeptic
"Dose"	2020	Factory Reset
"Anthem"	2021	Factory Reset
"Is Anarchy a Good Hobby?"	2021	Factory Reset
"Caught In a Carousel"	2021	Factory Reset
"Act Out"	2021	Factory Reset
"Hands Around My Throat"	2021	Factory Reset
"Breathe"	2022	Factory Reset
"Angel"	2024	Vertigo
"Pieces Back Together"	2024	Vertigo
"Savages"	2024	Vertigo
"Recover"	2025	Vertigo
"Godsend"	2025	Vertigo
"Wonderland"	2025	Vertigo

=== As featured artist ===
- "Life, Barefoot" by Makari (2012)
- "Year of The Light" by Stolas from the album Living Creatures (2013)
- "Superbass" (Nicki Minaj cover) with Will Pugh and Snowden(2013)
- "Everything Is Chrome in the Future" by Cinsera from the album Coryphee (2014)
- "Winter Everywhere" by Slaves from the album Routine Breathing (2015)
- "All I Have" by Amarionette from the album Repeating History (2016)
- "Unattainable" by Cadence Kid (2017)
- "Bones" by StayLoose (2017)
- "Silver Tongues" by I The Mighty (2017)
- "Memories" by Foxera (2018)
- "Better Now (Post Malone cover)" by Our Last Night (2018)
- "Same Old Song" by The Jon Hill Project (2019)
- "Action" by Don Broco with Taka Moriuchi, Tyler Carter, and Caleb Shomo (2019)
- "THEMURIWITHHUMANHAIR" by Bilmuri from the album Rich Sips (2019)
- "Graveyard" (Halsey cover) by Bilmuri from the compilation Muri and Friends (2020)
- "Drive" by Adventure Club and Beauz from the album Love // Chaos (2021)
- "Falling Out Of Rhythm" by Marigolds+Monsters
- "Christmas, Don't Be Late" with Anthony Green

== Music videos ==
Year	Song	Director
2012	"Up In the Air"	Shawn Butcher
2015	"Tug of War"	Unknown
2015	"Satellite"	John Howe
2018	"Cocky"	Miguel Barbosa
2018	"Hold On"	Shawn Butcher
2021	"Anthem"	Dillon Novak
2021	"Is Anarchy a Good Hobby?"	Katharine White
2024	"Angel"	Jake Johnston
2024	"Pieces Back Together"	Jon Vulpine
2024	"Savages"	Unknown
2025	"Recover"	Unknown
2025	"Wonderland"	Unknown
