= Tides of Man =

American band

- Origin: Tampa, Florida, U.S.
- Genres: Progressive rock; post-rock; experimental rock; post-hardcore
- Years active: 2008–present
- Labels: Rise
- Members: Spencer Gill; Alan Jaye; Josh Gould; Daniel Miller; Spencer Bradham
- Past members: Adam Sene; Tilian Pearson

Tides of Man is an American progressive rock band formed in Tampa, Florida in 2008. The now-instrumental band currently consists of members Spencer Gill (lead guitar), Josh Gould (drums), Alan Jaye (bass guitar), and Daniel Miller (guitar). The band's former lead vocalist Tilian Pearson and rhythm guitarist Adam Sene departed from the group in 2010. The band signed with Rise Records and released the studio albums Empire Theory (2009) and Dreamhouse (2010), and independently went on to release their third album Young and Courageous in 2014 and their fourth album Every Nothing in 2018.

== History ==
Tides of Man first released their self titled debut EP in 2008. After the release of their self titled EP, the band signed to Rise Records to release their full length debut Empire Theory in 2009. Then in 2010, Tides of Man released their follow up to 2009's debut with Dreamhouse. Shortly after the release of Dreamhouse, vocalist Tilian Pearson departed from the group.

=== Departure of Pearson and Young and Courageous (2010–present) ===
On December 20, 2010, the band announced that Pearson had left the band to focus on a new musical project (reportedly to become the lead singer of Saosin, but he ended up replacing Jonny Craig as the lead singer in Dance Gavin Dance). The band also stated that they were going to audition new singers and continue on as a band. The departure of Pearson forced them to drop off the No Rain, No Rainbow tour with Greeley Estates and the Downtown Battle Mountain II tour with Dance Gavin Dance that took place early 2011. After Pearson's departure, the group wrote instrumental tracks while looking for a new vocalist. It was also announced that Spencer Bradham has joined as keyboardist, although later it was clarified he only joined as a studio member due to him not being able to go on tour because of his work as an audio engineer.

The band's first instrumental album, Young and Courageous was released on February 4, 2014.

The band released its second instrumental album, Every Nothing, on August 3, 2018.

== Style and songwriting ==
Songwriting is an integrative process involving every member, with the exception of vocal tracking for Empire Theory, on which Pearson recorded separately from the band, due to being in a different city. Empire Theory is a concept album about war and mercy with the songs being mapped out. On Dreamhouse many of the songs were written by either Gill or Pearson sitting in a room alone, coming up with a song structure and essential riffs. Then the drums and bass were worked individually and the songs were interactively built piece by piece. The recurring theme lyrically in Dreamhouse is about not taking the life you have for granted.

== Members ==
Current members

- Spencer Gill – lead guitar (2008–present), vocals (2008–2010)
- Josh Gould – drums, percussion (2008–present)
- Alan Jaye – bass (2008–present)
- Daniel Miller – rhythm guitar (2011–present)

Session members

- Spencer Bradham – piano (2012–present)

Former members

- Tilian Pearson – lead vocals, rhythm guitar, piano (2008–2010)
- Adam Sene – rhythm guitar (2008–2010)

Timeline

== Discography ==
Studio albums

- Empire Theory (Rise, 2009)
- Dreamhouse (Rise, 2010)
- Young and Courageous (2014)
- Every Nothing (2018)

EPs

- Tides of Man (2008)
- Re:Visions (2019)

== Music videos ==
- "Not My Love 2" directed by Caleb Mallery
- "We Were Only Dreaming" directed by James Rockwell
- "New Futures" directed by Clyde Cronin
