= Tree City Sessions =

Live album by Dance Gavin Dance
- Released: May 13, 2016
- Recorded: Sacramento, California
- Genres: Post-hardcore; experimental rock; emo; progressive rock; funk rock; math rock; pop rock; screamo
- Length: 48:10
- Label: Rise
- Producers: Josh Benton; Joe Johnston

Dance Gavin Dance chronology
Instant Gratification (2015)	Tree City Sessions (2016)	Mothership (2016)

Tree City Sessions is a live album by American rock band Dance Gavin Dance, released on May 13, 2016, on Rise Records.

== Background and recording ==
The band announced Tree City Sessions on March 2, 2016. The live session version of "Alex English", originally from the band's self-titled album, was released on March 31, 2016. The live album contains 12 live recorded songs performed by the band in Sacramento, California, at the Pus Cavern recording studio.

== Track listing ==
No.	Title	Writer(s)	Original album	Length
1.	"Alex English"	Will Swan, Kurt Travis, Jon Mess, Matt Mingus	Dance Gavin Dance	4:28
2.	"The Robot with Human Hair, Pt. 4"	Swan, Tilian Pearson, Mess, Tim Feerick, Mingus	Acceptance Speech	3:27
3.	"Tree Village"	Swan, Travis, Mingus, Zac Garren	Happiness	3:21
4.	"Lemon Meringue Tie"	Swan, Jonny Craig, Mess, Mingus	Downtown Battle Mountain	3:50
5.	"We Own the Night"	Swan, Pearson, Mess, Feerick, Mingus	Instant Gratification	3:27
6.	"Thug City"	Swan, Craig, Mess, Mingus	Downtown Battle Mountain II	3:18
7.	"Carl Barker"	Swan, Travis, Mingus, Garren	Happiness	5:19
8.	"Death of a Strawberry"	Swan, Pearson, Mess, Feerick, Mingus	Instant Gratification	4:10
9.	"The Jiggler"	Swan, Pearson, Mess, Feerick, Mingus	Acceptance Speech	4:53
10.	"Me and Zoloft Get Along Just Fine"	Swan, Travis, Mess, Mingus	Dance Gavin Dance	3:08
11.	"Spooks"	Swan, Craig, Mess, Mingus	Downtown Battle Mountain II	4:03
12.	"And I Told Them I Invented Times New Roman"	Swan, Craig, Mess, Mingus	Downtown Battle Mountain	4:53
Total length:				48:10

== Personnel ==
Dance Gavin Dance

- Tilian Pearson - clean vocals
- Jon Mess - unclean vocals
- Will Swan - lead guitar, backing vocals
- Tim Feerick - bass guitar
- Matt Mingus - drums, percussion

Additional musicians

- Josh Benton - guitar on tracks 1–7 and 10–12
- Martin Bianchini - guitar on tracks 8 and 9

Production

- Josh Benton – recording, mixing
- Joe Johnston – mastering

== Charts ==
Chart (2016)	Peak position
US Billboard 200	137
