= Blood Wolf =

Single by Dance Gavin Dance
- B-side: "Head Hunter"
- Released: October 11, 2019
- Recorded: January 2019
- Studio: Interlace Recording, Portland, Oregon
- Genre: Post-hardcore; experimental rock
- Length: 3:51
- Label: Rise
- Songwriters: Jonathan Mess; Matthew Mingus; Tim Feerick; Will Swan; Tilian Pearson
- Producer: Kris Crummett

Dance Gavin Dance singles chronology
"Head Hunter" (2019)	"Blood Wolf" (2019)	"Prisoner" (2020)

"Blood Wolf" is a song performed by the American rock band Dance Gavin Dance. It was released as a single for digital download and streaming on October 11, 2019, by Rise Records. It is a b-side to the band's 2019 single "Head Hunter". It was produced by Kris Crummett. Following its release, it charted at number 24 on the Billboard Hot Rock Songs chart, the group's first career charting single.

== Background ==
On June 8, 2018, Dance Gavin Dance released their eighth full-length studio album, Artificial Selection. The band toured extensively in support of its release, including tours with the American rock band Underoath and embarking on The Artificial Selection Tour from March to May 2019. In January 2019, the group decided to record new material with Kris Crummett at Interlace Audio Recording Studios in Portland, Oregon. On March 22, 2019, the group released a stand-alone single, "Head Hunter", accompanied with its music video.

== Recording ==
On January 22, 2019, Dance Gavin Dance's lead guitarist Will Swan announced on Twitter that he was recording new material in Portland at Crummett's recording studio Interlace Audio. "Blood Wolf" was produced, mixed and mastered by Crummett with audio engineering by Ricky Orozco assisted by GiGi Zimmer.

== Music video ==
The music video for "Blood Wolf" was released on the same day as the single's digital and streaming release, on October 11, 2019. It was directed by Mount Emult, who had previously directed music videos for the band's 2017 single "Summertime Gladness" and the 2018 single "Count Bassy".

== Credits and personnel ==
Dance Gavin Dance

- Tilian Pearson – clean vocals, rhythm guitar
- Jon Mess – unclean vocals
- Tim Feerick – bass guitar
- Will Swan – lead guitar, backing vocals
- Matthew Mingus – drums, percussion

Production

- Kris Crummett – production, mixing engineer
- Ricky Orozco – audio engineer
- GiGi Zimmer – assistant engineer

== Chart performance ==
Following its release, "Blood Wolf" debuted at number 24 on the Billboard Hot Rock Songs chart on October 26, 2019.
