= Head Hunter (song) =

2019 song by Dance Gavin Dance

Single by Dance Gavin Dance
- B-side: "Blood Wolf"
- Released: March 22, 2019
- Recorded: January 2019
- Studio: Interlace Recording, Portland, Oregon
- Genre: Post-hardcore; experimental rock
- Length: 2:54
- Label: Rise
- Songwriters: Tilian Pearson; Jon Mess; Will Swan; Tim Feerick; Matthew Mingus; Andrew Wells
- Producer: Kris Crummett

Dance Gavin Dance singles chronology
"Count Bassy" (2018)	"Head Hunter" (2019)	"Blood Wolf" (2019)

"Head Hunter" is a song performed by American rock band Dance Gavin Dance. It was released as a stand-alone single for digital download and streaming on March 22, 2019, through Rise Records. The song was written by the band's vocalists Tilian Pearson and Jon Mess, with the music composed by the band with additional guitar and vocals from Eidola guitarist Andrew Wells.

== Background ==
Dance Gavin Dance released their eighth studio album, Artificial Selection, on June 8, 2018, on Rise Records. In support of the album, the band toured on The Artificial Selection Tour, as well as touring as support on American post-hardcore band Underoath's headlining North American tours in 2018. Head Hunter was a stand-alone release, and was not featured on the band's ninth studio album, Afterburner.

== Recording ==
On January 22, 2019, Dance Gavin Dance's lead guitarist Will Swan revealed on Twitter that he was recording new material in Portland, Oregon, at Kris Crummett's recording studio Interlace Audio. On the same day, vocalist Tilian Pearson replied to Swan's tweet stating "Be there in a couple days!"

It was produced, mixed, and mastered by Crummett with audio engineering handled by Ricky Orozco and assistance from GiGi Zimmer. The band's touring guitarist, Andrew Wells, performed rhythm guitar and backing vocals on the track, with additional backing vocals from Will Swan.

== Promotion ==
In support of "Head Hunter", the track was performed at the group's first annual headlining festival, SwanFest, and on the remainder of their Artificial Selection Tour, from March to May 2019. A music video premiered on the same day as the single's release. The band's label, Rise Records, released 7-inch LP vinyl and t-shirt bundles on their website.

== Music video ==
The music video for "Head Hunter" premiered on the same day as the single's digital download release, on March 22, 2019. According to Alternative Press, "[..] the video shows an intense shootout that takes an unexpected turn. Make sure to watch through to the end, but we can give you one hint — let them eat cake." The video features multiple easter eggs and references to the group's previously released music and videos, including references from the music video for "Inspire the Liars" and a lyric from their 2008 song "Rock Solid".

The music video garnered 408,000 views within its first week.

== Artwork ==
The single's cover art was illustrated by Mattias Adolfsson who has illustrated all of the group's studio albums since their 2007 debut studio album Downtown Battle Mountain. Replying to a fan on Facebook, speaking about the single art, Adolfsson confirmed that the illustration was not the full art and that the second half will be for the band's follow-up single. The follow-up single, "Blood Wolf", was released with the other half of the artwork on October 11, 2019.

== Credits and personnel ==
Dance Gavin Dance

- Tilian Pearson – clean vocals
- Jon Mess – unclean vocals
- Tim Feerick – bass guitar
- Will Swan – lead guitar, backing vocals
- Matthew Mingus – drums, percussion

Additional personnel

- Andrew Wells – rhythm guitar, backing vocals

Production

- Kris Crummett – production, mixing engineer
- Ricky Orozco – audio engineer
- GiGi Zimmer – assistant engineer
