= Perfect Enemy (album) =

Studio album by Tilian
- Released: November 27, 2015
- Recorded: September 2015 in Portland, Oregon and Atlanta, Georgia
- Genre: Indie pop; folk-pop
- Label: Vital
- Producer: Kris Crummett; Matt Malpass

Tilian chronology
Future Friends (2014)	Perfect Enemy (2015)	Patient EP (2017)

Singles from Perfect Enemy
- 1. "Tug of War" Released: October 14, 2015; 2. "All I Ever Do" Released: November 2, 2015; 3. "Dreaming" Released: November 11, 2015; 4. "Satellite" Released: November 17, 2015

Perfect Enemy is the second studio album by American singer-songwriter Tilian Pearson, released on November 27, 2015, on Vital Records. The album was produced by Kris Crummett and Matt Malpass. It is Pearson's final studio album to be released on Vital before signing to Rise Records three years later.

== Background ==
Perfect Enemy was written over the last three years and recorded throughout September 2015. In an interview with magazine Teal Cheese, Pearson revealed that he recorded six songs with producer Kris Crummett in Portland, Oregon, tracked one song in Malibu, California, and worked with producer Matt Malpass in Atlanta, Georgia. The tracks on the album were mixed and mastered throughout various studios in Los Angeles. When asked how Pearson wanted the album's sound to be, he answered:

I wanted this album to sound more organic, so we used a lot more real instruments as opposed to synths and samples. There's a rock song, a couple uptempo folk and pop songs and a good amount of songs with more space.

== Promotion ==
Prior to the album's announcement, Tilian released his single "Tug of War" on October 14, 2015 accompanied with its music video. He later released a lyric video for the single on October 16. Later that month on October 29, 2015, he announced that he would release Perfect Enemy on November 27, 2015 through is official Facebook. In support of the album, he released "All I Ever Do" on November 2, 2015. "Dreaming" was released on November 11, 2015. The music video for the song "Satellite" premiered on Tilian's official YouTube on November 17, 2015.

A lyric video for "Future Friends" was released on YouTube in promotion of the album on December 8, 2015. A lyric video for "Hold Me Down" was released to YouTube on December 23, 2015.

== Tour ==
On December 23, 2015, Tilian announced the tour dates for his North American headlining solo tour with support from American singer Myke Terry, He toured as a co-headliner on a U.S. tour with Jonny Craig and Kurt Travis spanning from April 15 to May 22, 2016.

== Track listing ==
All tracks are written by Tilian Pearson.

No.	Title	Length
1.	"True"	3:27
2.	"Didn't I Get the Message"	3:03
3.	"Satellite"	3:23
4.	"Tug of War"	3:06
5.	"Stranger"	2:51
6.	"Drift"	3:55
7.	"Heartfelt"	3:38
8.	"Hold Me Down"	2:44
9.	"Alive"	4:18
10.	"All I Ever Do"	3:13
11.	"Future Friends"	4:00
12.	"Dreaming"	3:53
Total length:		41:32
