= Acceptance Speech (album) =

2013 studio album by Dance Gavin Dance

Studio album by Dance Gavin Dance
- Released: October 8, 2013
- Genres: Post-hardcore; experimental rock; math rock; progressive rock
- Length: 44:07
- Label: Rise
- Producer: Matt Malpass

Dance Gavin Dance chronology
Downtown Battle Mountain II (2011)	Acceptance Speech (2013)	Instant Gratification (2015)

Singles from Acceptance Speech
- 1. "The Robot with Human Hair, Pt. 4" Released: July 19, 2013; 2. "Acceptance Speech" Released: September 16, 2013; 3. "Jesus H. Macy" Released: September 30, 2013; 4. "Strawberry Swisher, Pt. 3" Released: October 31, 2013; 5. "Death of the Robot with Human Hair" Released: March 7, 2014

Professional ratings
Review scores
Source	Rating
Allmusic	3/5 stars
Cryptic Rock	4/5 stars
Deadpress	8/10
Kill The Music	7.5/10

Acceptance Speech is the fifth studio album by American rock band Dance Gavin Dance, released on October 8, 2013, on Rise Records. The album serves as a follow-up to the band's fourth studio album, Downtown Battle Mountain II (2011), and is the band's first studio album to feature clean vocalist Tilian Pearson, bass guitarist Tim Feerick, and guitarist Josh Benton. It is the band's only studio album to feature Benton on rhythm guitar, who departed shortly after the album's release. The album was produced by Matt Malpass, which marks the band's first and only studio album to not be produced by Kris Crummett, who has produced all of the band's previous releases starting with Whatever I Say Is Royal Ocean (2006).

The album was announced on July 18, 2013. It was supported by the lead single, "The Robot with Human Hair, Pt. 4", released on July 19, 2013. The promotional single, the title-track "Acceptance Speech", was released on September 16. The second promotional single, "Jesus H. Macy", was released on September 30. The band released a music video for "Strawberry Swisher, Pt. 3" on October 31. Another music video, for "Death of the Robot with Human Hair", premiered on March 7, 2014. The band released a B-side track, titled "Pussy Vultures", a song from the recording sessions for the album, on September 22, 2014. They toured on the Acceptance Speech Tour and the Rise Records Tour in 2014 to promote the album. On August 30, 2019, the band released an instrumental and a remastered version of the album, Acceptance Speech 2.0, to streaming and digital download platforms.

== Track listing ==
All tracks are written by Will Swan, Tilian Pearson, Jon Mess, Tim Feerick, and Matt Mingus.

No.	Title	Length
1.	"Jesus H. Macy"	3:25
2.	"The Robot with Human Hair, Pt. 4"	3:33
3.	"Acceptance Speech"	4:26
4.	"Carve"	2:49
5.	"Doom & Gloom"	3:41
6.	"Strawberry Swisher, Pt. 3"	3:35
7.	"Honey Revenge"	3:28
8.	"Demo Team"	3:08
9.	"Death of the Robot with Human Hair"	5:07
10.	"The Jiggler"	4:55
11.	"Turn Off the Lights, I'm Watching Back to the Future, Pt. II"	6:00
Total length:		44:07

B-Side
No.	Title	Length
1.	"Pussy Vultures"	5:27

Notes

- "Pussy Vultures" is not featured on the standard release of the album and was instead released as a single.
- "Acceptance Speech" and "Death of the Robot with Human Hair" feature additional vocals from Will Swan.

== Critical reception ==
The album received mixed to positive reviews from critics, with praise being directed towards certain aspects of the album. However, Tilian Pearson's vocals received lukewarm reviews, along with the unique mix of genres. Deadpress concluded their review by saying "what we have here is a refreshing DGD who’ve managed to maintain their identity regardless, and maybe we’ll also have a consistent line-up for the foreseeable future" and gave the album a rating of eight out of ten.

Criticism was leveled against the production and lyrical content. Jordan Baker of Tuned Up describes the production as "what takes away from the album the most," comparing with the band's previous albums where the production "accentuated each different section" instead of having it all "sound the same." Adam Thomas from sputnikmusic noted Mess's lyrics as being "so far beyond hit or miss that it is just absurd."

== Personnel ==
Dance Gavin Dance

- Tilian Pearson – clean vocals
- Jon Mess – unclean vocals
- Will Swan – lead guitar, backing vocals, rapping (on tracks 3, 9)
- Josh Benton – rhythm guitar
- Tim Feerick – bass guitar
- Matt Mingus – drums, percussion

Production

- Matt Malpass – production, engineering, mixing
- Kris Crummett – mastering
- Mattias Adolfsson – artwork
- Additional guitar by Martin Bianchini
- Management by Eric Rushing
- Booking by Jeremy Holgerson

== Chart performance ==
Chart (2013)	Peak position
US Billboard 200	42
US Top Alternative Albums (Billboard)	13
US Top Hard Rock Albums (Billboard)	6
US Independent Albums (Billboard)	7
US Top Rock Albums (Billboard)	14

== Acceptance Speech 2.0 ==
Acceptance Speech 2.0

Studio album (remaster) by Dance Gavin Dance
- Released: August 30, 2019
- Recorded: 2013
- Genres: Post-hardcore; experimental rock; math rock; progressive rock
- Length: 44:05 (remaster); 44:17 (instrumental)
- Label: Rise
- Producers: Matt Malpass; Kris Crummett (remaster)

Dance Gavin Dance chronology
Artificial Selection (2018)	Acceptance Speech 2.0 (2019)	Afterburner (2020)

Acceptance Speech 2.0 is a remaster of American rock band Dance Gavin Dance's fifth studio album, Acceptance Speech (2013), released on August 30, 2019, on Rise Records. The remaster coincides with the release of the instrumental version of the album, and was produced by Kris Crummett.

=== Background ===
On May 31, 2019, Dance Gavin Dance released an instrumental version of their eighth studio album, Artificial Selection. The band began a pattern of releasing an instrumental version of their albums on the last Friday of every month since, with Mothership (2016), being released on June 28 and Instant Gratification (2015), on July 26.

In April 2019, vocalist Tilian Pearson revealed that a remastered version of the band's fifth studio album Acceptance Speech (2013), was completed and would be released the same year. On August 29, it was confirmed that a remastered and an instrumental version of the album would be released the following day.

=== Track listing ===
Acceptance Speech 2.0
No.	Title	Length
1.	"Jesus H. Macy"	3:25
2.	"The Robot with Human Hair, Pt. 4"	3:31
3.	"Acceptance Speech"	4:25
4.	"Carve"	2:49
5.	"Doom & Gloom"	3:40
6.	"Strawberry Swisher, Pt. 3"	3:35
7.	"Honey Revenge"	3:26
8.	"Demo Team"	3:08
9.	"Death of the Robot with Human Hair"	5:08
10.	"The Jiggler"	4:56
11.	"Turn Off the Lights, I'm Watching Back to the Future, Pt. II"	5:58
Total length:		44:05

Acceptance Speech 2.0 – Instrumental
No.	Title	Length
1.	"Jesus H. Macy (Instrumental)"	3:25
2.	"The Robot with Human Hair, Pt. 4 (Instrumental)"	3:33
3.	"Acceptance Speech (Instrumental)"	4:26
4.	"Carve (Instrumental)"	2:50
5.	"Doom & Gloom (Instrumental)"	3:41
6.	"Strawberry Swisher, Pt. 3 (Instrumental)"	3:35
7.	"Honey Revenge (Instrumental)"	3:28
8.	"Demo Team (Instrumental)"	3:10
9.	"Death of the Robot with Human Hair (Instrumental)"	5:10
10.	"The Jiggler (Instrumental)"	4:54
11.	"Turn Off the Lights, I'm Watching Back to the Future, Pt. II (Instrumental)"	5:59
Total length:		44:17

=== Credits and personnel ===
Dance Gavin Dance

- Tilian Pearson – clean vocals
- Jon Mess – unclean vocals
- Will Swan – lead guitar, backing vocals, rapping (on tracks 3, 9)
- Josh Benton – rhythm guitar
- Tim Feerick – bass guitar
- Matt Mingus – drums, percussion

Production

- Matt Malpass – production, engineering
- Kris Crummett – mastering, mixing
- Mattias Adolfsson – artwork
- Martin Bianchini – additional guitar
- Eric Rushing – management
- Jeremy Holgerson – booking
