= Mothership (Dance Gavin Dance album) =

Studio album by Dance Gavin Dance
- Released: October 7, 2016
- Recorded: April–June 2016
- Studio: Interlace Audio Recording Studios (Portland, Oregon)
- Genres: Post-hardcore; math rock; emo
- Length: 49:43
- Label: Rise
- Producer: Kris Crummett

Dance Gavin Dance chronology
Tree City Sessions (2016)	Mothership (2016)	Artificial Selection (2018)

Singles from Mothership
- 1. "Chucky vs. The Giant Tortoise" Released: August 18, 2016; 2. "Betrayed by the Game" Released: September 16, 2016; 3. "Young Robot" Released: September 27, 2016; 4. "Inspire the Liars" Released: March 3, 2017

Mothership is the seventh studio album by American rock band Dance Gavin Dance, released on October 7, 2016, on Rise Records. The album serves as a follow-up the group's sixth studio album, Instant Gratification (2015), and is their second consecutive studio release with the same consistent line-up. The album was produced by Kris Crummett. Upon its release, the album sold over 19,000 copies within its first week in retail, debuting at number 13 on the Billboard 200.

The album was supported by four singles; "Chucky Vs. The Giant Tortoise", "Betrayed by the Game", "Young Robot", and "Inspire the Liars". To promote the album, the band embarked on the Mothership Tour, which consisted of two North American legs and one European leg, and toured on the 2017 Vans Warped Tour. On June 28, 2019, the band released an instrumental version of the album to streaming and digital download platforms.

== Recording ==
Mothership was recorded by the band at Interlace Audio Recording Studios in North Portland, Oregon over a two-month period between April and June 2016 with producer Kris Crummett. During the recording sessions for the album, the band sought out and collaborated with other musicians such as Andrew Michael Wells of Eidola, Aric Garcia of Hail the Sun, Martin Bianchini of Secret Band, and former Dance Gavin Dance guitarist Zachary Garren of Strawberry Girls.

== Artwork ==
The album artwork for Mothership was created by Swedish illustrator and artist Mattias Adolfsson, who has previously created the album artwork for six of Dance Gavin Dance's studio albums. The album cover depicts a "mothership" in the upper sector of the photo in the shape of an infinity symbol whilst citizens praise its arrival on the ground below. Easter eggs are also illustrated in the album's artwork, including the Death Star-inspired space ship as seen on the band's 2008 self-titled studio album.

== Promotion ==
Professional ratings
Aggregate scores
Source	Rating
Metacritic	78/100
Review scores
Source	Rating
Rock Sound	7/10

Mothership was unveiled by the band on July 27, 2016, slated for an October 7, 2016 release date. On August 18, Dance Gavin Dance released the album's lead single, "Chucky vs. The Giant Tortoise", for digital download. A second single, "Betrayed by the Game", was released on September 16. On the same day, the music video for "Betrayed by the Game" premiered on the official Rise Records YouTube channel. An animated music video for the song "Young Robot" premiered on September 27, 2016. On March 3, 2017, the band released the music video for their single "Inspire the Liars".

Throughout the week prior to the release of Mothership, the band uploaded previews of songs off of the album daily on their social media.

Three years later, on June 28, 2019, Rise Records released an instrumental version of Mothership.

=== Tour ===
The band embarked on the headlining Mothership Tour in the United States and Canada from September 22 to October 27, 2016. The tour included support from The Contortionist, Hail the Sun, Good Tiger, and The White Noise. A European headlining tour took place from November 3 to November 26, 2016 with special guest appearances from former members Jonny Craig and Kurt Travis in honor of the band's tenth anniversary.

Another North American tour took place from February 24 to March 19, 2017 with special guest CHON and support from Eidola and Vasudeva. The band toured the entirety of the 2017 Vans Warped Tour from June 16 to August 6, 2017.

== Track listing ==
All tracks are written by Will Swan, Tilian Pearson, Jon Mess, Tim Feerick, and Matt Mingus.

No.	Title	Length
1.	"Chucky vs. The Giant Tortoise"	3:56
2.	"Young Robot"	3:39
3.	"Frozen One"	2:48
4.	"Flossie Dickey Bounce"	2:54
5.	"Deception"	3:52
6.	"Inspire the Liars"	4:35
7.	"Philosopher King"	3:39
8.	"Here Comes the Winner"	4:47
9.	"Exposed"	3:32
10.	"Betrayed by the Game"	3:10
11.	"Petting Zoo Justice"	3:27
12.	"Chocolate Jackalope"	3:50
13.	"Man of the Year"	5:34
Total length:		49:43

== Personnel ==
Dance Gavin Dance

- Tilian Pearson – clean vocals
- Jon Mess – unclean vocals
- Will Swan – lead guitar, rap vocals on "Chocolate Jackalope"
- Tim Feerick – bass guitar
- Matthew Mingus – drums, percussion

Additional musicians

- Zachary Garren – guitar on "Chucky vs. The Giant Tortoise", "Flossie Dickey Bounce", "Inspire the Liars"
- Martin Bianchini – guitar on "Petting Zoo Justice", "Chocolate Jackalope", "Man of the Year"
- Andrew Wells – guitar on "Deception"
- Jessica Esposito – flute on "Young Robot"

Production

- Kris Crummett – producer
- Mattias Adolfsson – album artwork

== Charts ==
Chart (2016)	Peak position
US Billboard 200	13
