= Wolf & Bear =

American post-hardcore band

- Origin: Sacramento, California, United States
- Genres: Post-hardcore, progressive rock
- Years active: 2013–present
- Labels: Blue Swan, Rise
- Members: Marcus Cisneros; Cameron Nunez; Jacob Koval; Louie Baltazar; Steven Fernandes; Blair de Leon
- Past members: Nathaniel Duarte; Chad Stephens; Isaac Wilson; Ben Schlotthauer; Tim Feerick; Tyler Watt
- Website: Official Facebook

Wolf & Bear is an American post-hardcore band from Sacramento, California. Formed in 2013, the band consists of vocalists Marcus Cisneros and Blair de Leon, guitarists Cameron Nunez and Louie Baltazar, and drummer Jacob Koval. The band originated in the Central Valley hardcore punk music scene, later signing to Blue Swan Records and releasing a split with post-hardcore band Adventurer in May 2016 and their debut studio album, Everything Is Going Grey, in October 2017.

The band released the live album, Grey Sessions, in June 2018, which was followed by a four-track self-titled EP in August 2019. In 2020, they released the singles "Monstro" and "Street Rat". The following year, Wolf & Bear also signed to Rise Records after their label Blue Swan Records became an imprint.

== Career ==
=== Early years, lineup change (2014–2015) ===
Wolf & Bear formed in Manteca, California aiming to "expand on the progressive rock genre", in 2014. The band originally consisted of vocalists Isaac Wilson and Tyler Watt, lead guitarist Steven Fernandes, rhythm guitarist Cameron Nunez, and bass guitarist Ben Schlotthauer. In fall of 2015 lead vocalist Isaac Wilson departed the band. The band released their debut song, "Oil Cup", on January 27, 2015, featuring clean vocals from new lead singer Sam Kohl, now in Sea in the Sky. It was recorded at Pus Cavern Recording Studios in late 2014 with engineers Trent Hollingsworth and Nick Scott.

2015 brought a line-up change following the departure of Sam Kohl, Steven Fernandes, and Ben Schlotthauer. They were subsequently replaced by vocalist Marcus Cisneros, guitarist Louie Baltazar, and bass guitarist Nathaniel Duarte. They released their second single, "Sight", on September 8, 2015.

=== Signing to Blue Swan, Everything is Going Grey (2016–2017) ===
On January 6, 2016, they signed to Will Swan's record label Blue Swan Records. On March 29, 2016, the band released their single, "Different Fires", on the label. They released Wolf & Bear x Adventurer, a split EP with label-mates Adventurer, on May 20, 2016.

The band appeared on American post-hardcore band Dance Gavin Dance's 10-year anniversary tour in the United States in December 2015, alongside Strawberry Girls, Slaves, A Lot Like Birds, and Dayshell.

On June 8, 2017, they released the single "GreyBlood", their first with bass guitarist Tim Feerick, along with its music video, which premiered on Alternative Press. On September 10, 2017, it was confirmed by Blue Swan Records that Wolf & Bear was scheduled to release their debut studio album, Everything Is Going Grey, on October 3, 2017.

=== Grey Sessions, self-titled EP (2018–2019) ===
On June 5, 2018, the band released a five-track live album, Grey Sessions, recorded at Pus Cavern in Sacramento, California. From January 11 to 19, 2019, they toured in support of Sianvar's 2019. On February 28, 2019, they released the lead single, "Deleto", along with its music video, from an upcoming EP, and the second and third singles, "Red Hen" and "Lifeguard", on June 4, and July 18, 2019, respectively. The group's self-titled EP followed on August 14, 2019, becoming their first release since being dropped by Blue Swan, though later on they resigned.

=== Tim Feerick’s death, two singles, Afterburner Tour (2020–2022) ===
Wolf & Bear released two singles, "Street Rat" and "Monstro", each in April 2020. In December 2020, due to the ongoing COVID-19 pandemic and its effect on the music industry, the band broadcast the Pus Cavern Streaming Event, a live-stream concert broadcast. In February 2021, it was announced that the band's record label Blue Swan Records had become an imprint of the Portland, Oregon based label Rise Records, meaning Wolf & Bear, along with Royal Coda and Eidola, had signed with the label.

On March 24, 2022, Dance Gavin Dance released the single "Synergy" that features additional guitar parts from Louie Baltazar. On April 14, 2022, it was announced by Dance Gavin Dance that Wolf & Bear bass player Tim Feerick had died.

=== Bloodletter, canceled tour (2023–present) ===
On April 3, 2023, the band were set to be part of the Truth Decay Tour with You Me at Six and Mothica, however on August 15, 2023, the tour was canceled for personal reasons. The band released a new song, "There's No Dust in The City" which features Eidola and Dance Gavin Dance vocalist, Andrew Wells, as part of their new album Bloodletter on August 18, 2023. Bloodletter was later released on October 27, 2023, via Blue Swan and Rise Records.

In April 2025 the band announced their May tour would be their final with Tyler Watt as he would be leaving to pursue other projects. The band released a new song "Apollo" on October 17 with their new unclean vocalist Blair de Leon.

== Band members ==
Current

- Cameron Nunez – guitar (2013–present)
- Marcus Cisneros – clean vocals (2015–present)
- Louie Baltazar – guitar (2014–2016, 2020–present)
- Jacob Koval – drums (2014–present)
- Steven Fernandes – bass (2023–present)
- Blair de Leon – unclean vocals (2025–present)

Past

- Sam Kohl – clean vocals (2014–2015)
- Chad Stephens – drums (2013–2014)
- Nathaniel Duarte – bass guitar (2014–2016)
- Joshua Unitt – rhythm guitar (2016–2019)
- Isaac Wilson – clean vocals (2013–2014)
- Ben Schlotthauer – bass guitar (2014)
- Tim Feerick – bass guitar (2016–2022; died 2022)
- Tyler Watt – unclean vocals (2014–2025)

Timeline

== Discography ==
Studio albums

- Everything Is Going Grey (Blue Swan Records, 2017)
- Bloodletter (Blue Swan Records/Rise Records, 2023)
- A Hill To Die On (Blue Swan Records/Rise Records, 2026)

Extended plays

- Wolf & Bear x Adventurer Split (Blue Swan Records, 2016)
- Grey Sessions (Blue Swan Records, 2018)
- EP (2019)

Singles

- "Oil Cup" (2015)
- "Sight" (2015)
- "Different Fires" (2016)
- "Deleto" (2019)
- "Red Hen" (2019)
- "Lifeguard" (2019)
- "Street Rat" (2020)
- "Monstro" (2020)
- "There’s No Dust in The City (ft. Andrew Michael Wells)" (2023)
- “Quick Sip 84” (2023)
- "K. Resort" (2023)
- "Apollo" (2025)
- "Whiplash / Dr. Doot" (2026)
- "Rick Ranch" (2026)
