= Instant Gratification =

Studio album by Dance Gavin Dance
- Released: April 14, 2015
- Genres: Post-hardcore; math rock; experimental rock; pop rock; alternative rock
- Length: 42:49
- Label: Rise
- Producer: Kris Crummett

Dance Gavin Dance chronology
| Acceptance Speech (2013) | Instant Gratification (2015) | Tree City Sessions (2016) |

Singles from Instant Gratification
- 1. "On The Run" Released: February 12, 2015; 2. "We Own The Night" Released: March 12, 2015; 3. "Stroke God, Millionaire" Released: April 2, 2015; 4. "Eagle vs. Crows" Released: April 7, 2015

Instant Gratification (Instrumental)

Instant Gratification is the sixth studio album by American rock band Dance Gavin Dance, released on April 14, 2015, on Rise Records. The album serves as a follow-up to the group's fifth studio album, Acceptance Speech (2013), and is the first release since the departure of guitarist Josh Benton, who joined as a session member in 2013 and left the following year. The album also sees the return of producer Kris Crummett, who produced all of the band's previous studio albums except for Acceptance Speech.

The album was promoted by the lead single "On the Run", which was released on February 12, 2015. "We Own the Night" was released as the second single on March 12. The third single, "Stroke God, Millionaire", was released on April 2. The fourth and final single, "Eagle vs. Crows", was released on April 7. The band toured on the Instant Gratification Tour in North America, Australia and Europe, and toured as support with other bands such as Memphis May Fire in support of the album. On July 26, 2019, the band released an instrumental version of the album to streaming and digital download platforms.

== Background ==
Following extensive touring in support of their fifth studio album Acceptance Speech (2013), the band began recording sessions for their sixth studio album. The band debuted the song "Something New", the third track on Instant Gratification, live for the first time in December 2014 on the Rise Records Tour. The band released the album's lead single, "On the Run" on February 12, 2015. On March 12, "We Own The Night" was released as the second single from the album. On April 2, the music video for "Stroke God, Millionaire" was released. With the early release of the album during a 2-day show at the Boardwalk, the album was leaked onto the Internet through various websites on April 4, 2015.

=== Tour ===
In support of the album, Dance Gavin Dance announced the Instant Gratification Tour in North America with supporting acts Polyphia, Hail the Sun, and Stolas. The tour began on April 14 and concluded on May 8, 2015.

== Critical reception ==
Professional ratings
Aggregate scores
| Source | Rating |
|---|---|
| Metacritic | 76/100 |
Review scores
| Source | Rating |
| Exclaim! | 8/10 stars |
| Sputnikmusic | 4/5 stars |
| FDRMX | 4.5/5 stars |
| Absolutepunk | 7/10 stars |

Instant Gratification received generally positive reviews from music critics. Branan Ranjanathan from Exclaim! called the record "a culmination of the band's growth over the years," further writing that the band have managed "to outdo themselves...by exploiting all of the strongest points of their previous records." Sputnikmusic rated the album as a 3.7 out of 5, or "Excellent", on a user aggregate system, with one review on the site noting that the more you listened to the album the more gratification it gave the listener. Similarly, Mark Johnson of FDRMX gave the album a 4.5 out of 5, saying "this album reminds us just how much fun music can be". In another strong review, Steve Alcala of Absolutepunk said the album "feels like a strong return to form for a band that's well adjusted in its own sound and aura", while noting the many lineup changes the band has endured is evident in the music over its 10-year catalog.

== Track listing ==
All tracks are written by Will Swan, Tilian Pearson, Jon Mess, Tim Feerick, and Matt Mingus.

| No. | Title | Length |
|---|---|---|
| 1. | "We Own the Night" | 3:25 |
| 2. | "Stroke God, Millionaire" | 3:10 |
| 3. | "Something New" | 3:56 |
| 4. | "On the Run" | 4:13 |
| 5. | "Shark Dad" | 3:32 |
| 6. | "Awkward" | 4:01 |
| 7. | "The Cuddler" | 2:33 |
| 8. | "Legend" | 3:24 |
| 9. | "Eagle vs. Crows" | 2:56 |
| 10. | "Death of a Strawberry" | 4:10 |
| 11. | "Variation" | 3:58 |
| 12. | "Lost" | 3:29 |
| Total length: | | 42:49 |

Notes

- Track 10 is listed as "Death of the Strawberry Swisher" in the inner note of the album.

== Personnel ==
Dance Gavin Dance

- Tilian Pearson – clean vocals
- Jon Mess – unclean vocals
- Will Swan – lead and rhythm guitar, backing vocals, rap vocals on "Eagle vs. Crows"
- Tim Feerick – bass guitar
- Matt Mingus – drums

Additional personnel

- Martin Bianchini – guitars on "Shark Dad", "Lost", and "Death of a Strawberry"
- Aric Garcia – guitars on "Legend"
- Zachary Garren – guitars on "Awkward"

Production

- Kris Crummett – production, engineering, mixing, mastering
- Mattias Adolfsson – album artwork

== Chart performance ==
Instant Gratification debuted and peaked at No. 32 on the U.S. Billboard 200 Albums Chart, No. 15 on the Billboard Digital Albums chart, No. 2 on the Billboard Hard Rock and Top Rock Album charts, and topped the Billboard Independent Albums chart. The album sold 15,000 copies in its first week in the US. This made it the band's best selling album, until the release of their follow up 'Mothership' which sold over 19,000 copies.
