= Kris Crummett =

American record producer (born 1982)

- Born: Kristofer Crummett; November 19, 1982 (age 43); Hillsboro, Oregon
- Genres: Post-hardcore; indie rock; alternative rock; emo; progressive rock; metalcore
- Occupations: Record producer; songwriter; mixing and mastering engineer
- Years active: 2002–present
- Website: http://www.interlaceaudio.com

Kris Crummett is an American record producer and owner of Interlace Audio in Portland, Oregon. Crummett started recording in 2002. He has worked with many notable indie music record labels, including Rise Records, Epitaph Records, Fearless Records, Sumerian Records, Equal Vision Records, and Sony Japan. He is best known for his work with bands such as Sleeping With Sirens, Issues, Dance Gavin Dance, Drop Dead, Gorgeous and Alesana.

== Interlace Audio ==
Interlace Audio was founded by Kris in 2002 after years of recording his own bands. He quit his job as a City Park Landscaper to focus on music production, and within the first year of Interlace Audio he produced successful records for Anatomy of a Ghost, Fear Before the March of Flames, Crosstide, and LKN thus making the studio an instant hit amongst post-hardcore and emo artists.

== Commercial success ==
In 2011 Kris partook in producing, engineering, mixing, and mastering the Sleeping With Sirens second and breakout record, Let's Cheers to This. The popular single "If You Can't Hang" has accumulated over 115 million views on YouTube and has since become a RIAA certified Gold single, with the rest of the album being RIAA certified Silver. In 2014, Kris had two Billboard Top 10 records. Issues (band)'s self-titled and debut record "Issues" debuted at #9 and Crown The Empire's sophomore record "The Resistance: Rise Of The Runaways" debuted at #7 on the Billboard Top 200. 2015 Dance Gavin Dance's "Instant Gratification" debuted at #31 on the Billboard Top 200 charts and #18 on overall records sold. Another 2015 record, The Story So Far's self titled "The Story So Far" placed on Billboard Top 200 #23, #1 Vinyl Sales, #2 Independent Albums. 2016 brought more success, Dance Gavin Dance's "Mothership" placed on the Billboard Top 200 at #13, #3 Vinyl Sales, and #2 Hard Rock.The same year, Issues' sophomore record "Headspace" reached the Billboard Top 200 at #20 and #1 on Hard Rock. 2018 stretched his hot streak with the ever-growing Dance Gavin Dance, the record "Artificial Selection" placed on the Billboard Top 200 at #15.

== Other work ==
In addition to his album production credits, Crummett has also worked in audio software and music-production education. He collaborated with STL Tones to release several signature Kemper amp-profile packs, including Kris Crummett – Kemper Pack 03 and the Kris Crummett Producer Kemper Bundle.

Crummett has also taken part in professional audio-education programs. In 2014, he taught two CreativeLive courses on vocal production and hybrid mixing workflows. He also served as the featured instructor for URM Academy’s How It’s Done w/ Kris Crummett, a course that documents his end-to-end production process.

== Production discography ==
Year	Artist	Album title	Type	Label	Credits	Release date	Charts
2002	Crosstide	Seventeen Nautical Miles	Album	Rise Records	Engineer, Mixing	June 4, 2002	
2003	Anatomy of a Ghost	Evanesce	Album	Rise Records/Fearless Records	Producer	October 21, 2003	
2004	Fear Before The March of Flames	Odd How People Shake	Album	Rise Records	Producer	April 6, 2004	
2004	Lonely Kings	Ides of March	EP	Rise Records	Engineer, Mixing	May 19, 2004	
2004	LKN	In The Leap Year	Album	Greyday Productions	Producer	May 11, 2004	
2005	Inked in Blood	Lay Waste The Poets	Album	Facedown Records	Editing	April 11, 2005	
2005	Still Life Projector	Dance Riot	Album	Rise Records	Producer	June 27, 2005	
2005	Clarity Process	Killing The Precedent	Album	Rise Records	Producer, musician, composer	June 27, 2005	
2005	Coretta Scott	Scream & Shout	Album	Rise Records	Producer	August ??, 2005	
2005	Crosstide	Life As A Spectator	Album	Slowdance Records	Engineer	September 20, 2005	
2005	A Fall Farewell	Where Us Trouble Befalls and the Secrecy Enthralls	Album	Rise Records	Mastering	2005	
2006	LKN	Postulate 1	Album	Greyday Productions	Producer	April 11, 2006	
2006	Drop Dead, Gorgeous	In Vogue	Album	Rise Records	Producer	May 2, 2006	
2006	Catherine	Rumor Has It	Album	Rise Records	Mastering	June 4, 2006	
2006	The Devil Wears Prada	Dear Love: A Beautiful Discord	Album	Rise Records	Mastering	June 4, 2006	
2006	Broadway Calls	Call The Medic	Album	State of Mind Records	Engineer	September 12, 2006	
2006	Kaddisfly	Seasons	EP	Hopeless Records	Producer	October 24, 2006	
2006	Dance Gavin Dance	Whatever I Say Is Royal Ocean	Album	Rise Records	Mastering	November 14, 2006	
2007	Kaddisfly	Set Sail The Prairie	Album	Hopeless Records	Producer	March 13, 2007	
2007	It Prevails	The Inspiration	Album	Rise Records	Producer	April 3, 2007	
2007	Dance Gavin Dance	Downtown Battle Mountain	Album	Rise Records	Producer	May 15, 2007	
2007	I Am The Ocean	...And Your City Needs Swallowing	Album	Uprising Records	Producer	May 15, 2007	
2007	LKN	Postulate II	Album	Grayday Productions	Producer	May 15, 2007	
2007	Prize Country	Lottery of Recognition	Album	Exigent Records	Producer	June 28, 2007	
2007	Catherine	The Naturals	Album	Rise Records	Producer	August 7, 2007	
2007	Her Candane	No Battle	Album	Tribunal Records	Producer	November 6, 2007	
2008	Along Way Home	Solace	Album	Torque Records	Producer	2008	
2008	Here I Come Falling	Oh Grave, Where Is Thy Victory	Album	Rise Records	Producer	January 4, 2008	
2008	American Me	Heat	Album	Rise Records	Producer	February 19, 2008	
2008	Dead And Divine	The Fanciful	Album	Rise Records	Producer	March 18, 2008	
2008	Closure in Moscow	The Penance and The Patience	Album	Taperjean Records	Producer	April 19, 2008	
2008	In:Aviate	Speak	Album	Rise Records	Producer	May 13, 2008	
2008	We Are The Emergency	Seizure	E.P.	Firestarter Music	Producer	May 22, 2008	
2008	Lower Definition	The Greatest of All Lost Arts	Album	Ferret Music	Producer	August 7, 2008	
2008	Emarosa	Relativity	Album	Rise Records	Producer	August 7, 2008	Billboard 200 #191
2008	Dance Gavin Dance	Dance Gavin Dance	Album	Rise Records	Producer	August 19, 2008	Billboard 200 #172
2008	In:Aviate	1985	Album	Rise Records	Producer	October 14, 2008	
2009	In Fear and Faith	Your World on Fire	Album	Rise Records	Producer	January 6, 2009	
2009	No Bragging Rights	Consequence of Dreams	Album	Pure Noise Records	Producer	March 3, 2009	
2009	Catherine	Inside Out	Album	Rise Records	Producer	March 16, 2009	
2009	Loom	Selva Molhada	Album	Exigent Records	Producer	April 13, 2009	
2009	Elenora	In Reality I Am	Album	Self Released	Producer	September 1, 2009	
2009	Closure in Moscow	First Temple	Album	Equal Vision Records	Producer	May 5, 2009	
2009	Dance Gavin Dance	Happiness	Album	Rise Records	Producer	June 9, 2009	Billboard 200 #145
2009	Jonny Craig	A Dream Is a Question You Don't Know How to Answer	Album	Rise Records	Producer, engineering, mastering, composing, bass, drums, guitar, keyboards	August 18, 2009	
2010	Rags & Ribbons	E.P	E.P	Self Released	Producer	March 21, 2010	
2010	PMtoday	In Media Res	Album	Rise Records	Producer	April 5, 2010	
2010	Alesana	The Emptiness	Album	Fearless Records	Producer	April 12, 2010	Billboard 200 #68
2010	Oceana	Clean Head	E.P.	Rise Records	Mastering	May 10, 2010	
2010	We Are The Emergency	Whispers & Fragments	Album	Firestarter Music	Producer	May 10, 2010	
2010	Emarosa	Emarosa	Album	Rise Records	Vocal Engineer, Vocal Production	June 28, 2010	Billboard 200 #69
2010	Bizzy Bone	Crossroads 2010	Album	Sumerian Records	Producer	August 24, 2010	
2010	Scarlett O'Hara	Lost in Existence	Album	Rise Records	Producer	September 13, 2010	
2010	Tides of Man	Dreamhouse	Album	Rise Records	Producer	September 13, 2010	
2011	Decoder	Decoder	Album	Rise Records	Mastering	January 17, 2011	
2011	Dance Gavin Dance	Downtown Battle Mountain II	Album	Rise Records	Producer, engineering, mixing, mastering	March 7, 2011	Billboard 200 #82
2011	Sleeping With Sirens	Let's Cheers to This	Album	Rise Records	Producer, engineering, mastering, mixing, electronics, percussion, piano, strings	May 10, 2011	Billboard 200 #98 100.000+
2011	The Orphan The Poet	Translating	Album	Self Released	Producer	May 31, 2011	
2011	Eyes Like Diamonds	Frequencies	Album	Tragic Hero Records	Producer	June 18, 2011	
2011	Machree	Changer	Album	Self Released	Producer	July 12, 2011	
2011	Artifex Pereo	Ailments & Antidotes	Album	Self Released	Producer	July 23, 2011	
2011	Arms Like Yours	.Architect.	Album	Self Released	Producer	August 9, 2011	
2011	Man Overboard	Man Overboard	Album	Rise Records	Mastering. Produced by Steve Klein	September 26, 2011	
2011	A Lot Like Birds	Conversation Piece	Album	Doghouse Records	Producer	October 11, 2011	
2011	Alesana	A Place Where The Sun Is Silent	Album	Epitaph Records	Producer, engineer, mixing	October 14, 2011	Billboard 200 #52
2012	Electric Jesus	Desert Mouth	Album	Self Released	Producer	April 13, 2012	
2012	In Dependence	Realidad Sin Fantasia/Reality Without Fantasy	Album	The Juapi Music	Mixing and Mastering	November 9, 2012	
2012	Altars	Conclusions	Album	Facedown Records	Mastering	June 5, 2012	
2012	American Me	III	Album	Rise Records	Producer	August 1, 2012	
2012	Further Seems Forever	Penny Black	Album	Rise Records	Mastering	August 1, 2012	
2012	Night Verses	Out of the Sky	E.P	Easy Killer Records	Producer	September 25, 2012	
2012	Issues	Black Diamonds	E.P	Rise Records	Producer, engineer, mixing, mastering	November 12, 2012	Billboard 200 #96
2012	Tempting in Paris	Polaroids in July	Album	Revival Recordings	Producer	November 26, 2012	
2013	Message Through Motion	Earthshaker	Album	Self Released	Producer	January 22, 2013	
2012	Cinema Sleep	Make Your Way	Album	Standby Records	Producer	May 21, 2012	
2013	Idlehands	Common Soul	Album	Invogue Records	Producer	March 12, 2013	
2013	Tilian	Material Me	Album	Vital Records	Mastering	March 18, 2013	
2013	Fallstar	Backdraft	Album	Facedown Records	Producer, engineer, mixing, mastering	April 16, 2013	
2013	I Can Make A Mess	Enola	Album	Rise Records	Mastering	June 11, 2013	
2013	Night Verses	Lift Your Existence	Album	Easy Killer Records	Producer, engineer, mixing, mastering	June 25, 2013	
2013	Apollo	We Must Be Feeling The Moon	Album	Self Released	Producer	August 22, 2013	
2013	Bleach Blonde	Starving Artist	Album	Rise Records	Producer, engineer, mixing, mastering	23.09. 2013	
2013	Dance Gavin Dance	Acceptance Speech	Album	Rise Records	Mastering. Produced by Matt Malpass	October 7, 2013	
2013	A Lot Like Birds	No Place	Album	Equal Vision Records	Producer, engineer, mixing, mastering	October 29, 2013	Billboard 200 #199
2013	Icarus The Owl	Icarus The Owl	Album	TBA	Producer	July 2, 2014	
2013	Japanese Tongue-Sisters	Peacock	EP	Firestarter Music	Producer	TBA 2014	
2013	Issues	Issues	Album	Rise Records	Executive Producer, producer, engineering, mixing, mastering	February 18, 2014	Billboard 200 #9 22.000+ first week
2014	Alesana	The Decade EP	EP	Artery Recordings	Mastering	April 1, 2014	Billboard 200 #119
2014	Efecto Amalia	La república	Album	SRD Studios	Mixing and mastering	April 20, 2014	
2014	Miss Fortune	A Spark To Believe	Album	Sumerian Records	Producer, engineering, mixing, mastering	May 20, 2014	
2014	Artifex Pereo	Time in Place	Album	Tooth & Nail Records	Producer, engineering, mixing, mastering	May 27, 2014	
2014	Slaves	Through Art We Are All Equals	Album	Artery Recordings	Producer	June 24, 2014	
2014	Crown The Empire	The Resistance: Rise of the Runaways	Album	Rise Records	Mixing	July 22, 2014	Billboard 200 #7
2014	Hail The Sun	Wake	Album	Blue Swan Records	Mastering	September 23, 2014	
2014	Inamorata	Inamorata	Album	Self Released	Mastering	October 28, 2014	
2014	Stolas	Allomaternal	Album	Blue Swan Records	Producer	July 11, 2014	
2015	Tyler Carter	Leave Your Love	EP	Rise Records	Mastering	January 19, 2015	
2015	Better Off	Milk	Album	Equal Vision Records	Mastering	January 19, 2015	
2015	Concepts	Transitions	EP	Self Released	Mastering	February 17, 2015	
2015	Madam Officer	Madam Officer	EP	Self-Released	Mastering	March 3, 2015	
2015	Dance Gavin Dance	Instant Gratification	Album	Rise Records	Producer	April 14, 2015	Billboard 200 #32 14.000+ first week
2015	Alesana	Confessions	Album	Revival Recordings	Mastering	April 21, 2015	
2015	Eidola	Degeneraterra	Album	Blue Swan Records	Mastering	May 5, 2015	
2015	The Early November	Imbue	Album	Rise Records	Mastering	August 5, 2015	
2015	Being As An Ocean	Being As An Ocean	Album	InVogue Records	Mastering	June 30, 2015	
2015	The Story So Far	The Story So Far	Album	Pure Noise	Mastering	May 18, 2015	Billboard 200 #23
2015	Idlehands	Dena Mora	Album	Equal Vision Records	Producer	May 19, 2015	
2015	I the Mighty	Connector	Album	Equal Vision Records	Mixing, Mastering	February 6, 2015	
2015	Knuckle Puck	Copacetic	Album	Rise Records	Mastering	July 31, 2015	Billboard 200 #61
2015	Tilian	Perfect Enemy	Album	Vital Records	Producer, engineer, Mixing, Mastering	November 27, 2015	
2015	SECRETS	Everything That Got Us Here	Album	Rise Records	Mastering	November 12, 2015	
2016	The Funeral Portrait	A Moment Of Silence	Album	Revival Records	Mastering	December 16, 2016	
2016	To The Wind	The Brighter View	Album	Pure Noise Records	Mastering	October 7, 2016	
2016	I The Mighty	Oil In The Water	EP	Equal Vision Records	Mastering	September 2, 2016	
2016	Rival Choir	I Believe, Help My Unbelief	Album	Facedown Records	Mastering	February 5, 2016	
2016	Garrett Klahn	Garrett Klahn	Album	Rise Records	Mastering	January 15, 2016	
2016	My Iron Lung	Learn to Leave	Album	Pure Noise Records	Mastering	August 5, 2016	
2016	Capsize	A reintroduction: The Essence of all that Surrounds Me	Album	Equal Vision Records	Mastering	July 22, 2016	
2016	Sianvar	Stay Lost	Album	Blue Swan Records	Mastering	August 5, 2016	
2016	Icon For Hire	You Can't Kill Us	Album	Independent	Mastering	November 25, 2016	
2016	Night Verses	Into The Vanishing Light	Album	Equal Vision Records	Mastering	July 8, 2016	
2016	Fire from the Gods	Narrative	Album	Rise Records	Mastering	August 26, 2016	
2016	Survive Said The Prophet	FIXED	Album	Sony Japan	Producing, engineering, mixing, mastering	October 5, 2016	
2016	Like Pacific	Distant Like You Asked	Album	Pure Noise	Mastering	February 19, 2016	
2016	Avion Roe	In Separation	Album	Epitaph Records	Producer, engineer, Mixing, Mastering	June 17, 2016	
2016	Issues	Headspace	Album	Rise Records	Producer, engineer, Mixing, Mastering	May 20, 2016	Billboard 200 #20
2016	Dance Gavin Dance	Mothership	Album	Rise Records	Producer, engineer, Mixing, Mastering	July 10, 2016	Billboard 200 #13
2016	Dire Bloom	Facade	EP	Self Released	Mastering	September 12, 2016	
2017	Palisades	Palisades	Album	Rise Records	Mastering	January 20, 2017	
2017	Cliffside of the Pinkeyed Sky	Spacetime	EP	Self Released	Mastering	July 7, 2017	
2017	Tilian	Patient EP	EP	Vital, Razor & Tie	Mixing, mastering	September 1, 2017	
2017	After Change	Feelin' Fine	EP	Self Released	Mastering	September 26, 2017	
2017	Chapel	Sunday Brunch	Album	Rise Records	mastering	November 15, 2017	
2017	Black Map	In Droves	EP	eOne	mastering	March 17, 2017	
2017	Thousand Below	The Love You Let Too Close	Album	Rise Records	mastering	October 6, 2017	
2017	World War Me	That's So Yesterday	Album	Sharptone Records	mastering	July 7, 2017	
2017	The Gospel Youth	Always Lose	Album	Rise Records	mastering	July 14, 2017	
2017	Grayscale	Adornment	Album	Fearless Records	mastering	May 5, 2017	
2017	Secrets	Secrets	Album	Made In The Shade Records	production, engineering mixing, mastering	February 23, 2018	
2017	Sworn In	All Smiles	Album	Fearless Records	production, engineering, mixing, mastering	June 30, 2017	
2017	I The Mighty	Where The Mind Wants To Go / Where You Let It Go	Album	Equal Vision Records	production, engineering, mixing, mastering	October 20, 2017	
2017	Ashland	WildFire	Album	inVogue Records	mastering	March 14, 2017	
2017	Roam	Great Heights & Nosedives	Album	Hopeless Records	mastering	October 13, 2017	
2017	Comeback Kid	Outsider	Album	Victory Records	mastering	September 8, 2017	
2017	Survive Said The Prophet	WABI SABI	Album	Sony Japan	production, engineering, mixing, mastering	August 2, 2017	#36 album sales, Japanese Billboard Charts
2017	Knuckle Puck	Shapeshifter	Album	Rise Records	mastering	October 13, 2017	
2018	While My City Burns	Prone To Self Destruction	Album	WormHoleDeath	Mastering	Mars 30, 2018	
2018	One Shot Thrill	One Shot Thrill EP	EP	Independent	production, engineering, mixing, mastering, Drums	April 20, 2018	
2018	Don Vedda	Hell Of A Night	Album	Independent	production, engineering, mixing, mastering	June 8, 2018	
2018	Light Up The Sky	Hard To Love	single	Rise Records	production, engineering, mixing, mastering	January 19, 2018	
2018	Homesafe	One	Album	Pure Noise Records	mastering	June 29, 2018	
2018	Survive Said The Prophet	Found & Lost	EP	Sony Japan	mixing, mastering	August 1, 2018	
2018	Dance Gavin Dance	Artificial Selection	Album	Rise Records	production, engineering, drum & guitars	June 8, 2018	#15 Billboard Top 200
2018	Real Friends	Composure	Album	Fearless Records	mixing, mastering	July 13, 2018	
2018	Mayday Parade	Sunnyland B-sides	Album	Rise Records	mixing, mastering	June 15, 2018	
2018	Space Weather	Space Weather EP	Album	N/A	production, recording, mixing, mastering	October 5, 2018	
2018	Radiate	Human	Single	Independent	production, engineering, mixing, mastering	December 20, 2018	
2018	Napoleon	Epiphany	Album	Basick Records	mixing, mastering	November 2, 2018	
2018	Bearings	Blue In The Dark	Album	Pure Noise Records	mastering	October 12, 2018	
2018	Survive Said The Prophet	space[s]	Album	Sony Japan	production, engineering, mixing, mastering	September 26, 2018	Oricon General: 26th, Oricon Rock: 9th
2019	Cane Hill	Kill The Sun	EP	Rise Records	production, recording, mixing, mastering	January 11, 2019	
2019	Get Scared	The Dead Days	Album	Fearless Records	production, recording, mixing, mastering	April 19, 2019	
2019	Conversation Piece	Coordinates	EP	Independent	mastering	October 19, 2019	
2019	Radiate	I Promise This	Single	Independent	production, engineering, mixing, mastering	August 20, 2019	
2019	Cory Wells	"Patience" & "Lost"	Singles	Pure Noise Records	mastering	February 20, 2019	
2019	Homesafe	Without Warning	Single	Pure Noise Records	mastering	June 28, 2019	
2019	Bridge City Sinners	Here's To The Devil	Album	Flail Records	mastering	May 17, 2019	
2019	Volumes	Coming Clean	EP	Fearless Records	mastering	April 24, 2019	
2019	Sights & Sounds	No Virtue	Album	Entertainment One	mastering	October 11, 2019	
2019	Seaway	Fresh Produce	Album	Pure Noise Records	mastering	April 19, 2019	
2019	Sleep On It	Pride & Disaster	Album	Equal Vision Records	mastering	September 13, 2019	
2019	Chamber	Ripping / Pulling / Tearing	Album	Pure Noise Records	mastering	July 17, 2019	
2019	Dune Rats	No Plans	Single	Self Released	mastering	June 5, 2019	
2019	Dune Rats	Rubber Arm	Single	Self Released	mastering	September 2, 2019	
2019	Belmont	By My Side	Single	Pure Noise Records	mastering	September 19, 2019	
2019	I The Mighty	Cave In	Single	Equal Vision Records	mastering	March 29, 2019	
2019	Hail The Sun	Devastate & Recalibrate	Single	Equal Vision Records	mastering	September 2, 2019	
2019	Fredo Disco	(Very Cool) Acoustic’ EP	EP	Elektra Music Group	mastering	September 19, 2019	
2019	Bloodbather	End	Single	Rise Records	mastering	September 11, 2019	
2019	GLASYS	Defective Humanity	Album	Self Released	mastering	August 2, 2019	
2019	ROAM	Smile Wide	Album	Hopeless Records	mastering	September 6, 2019	
2019	Keith Merrow	Reading The Bones	Album	Self Released	mastering	April 4, 2019	
2019	Nick Johnston	Wide Eyes In The Dark	Album	Self Released	mastering	April 19, 2019	
2019	Ocean Sleeper	Don't Leave Me This Way	Album	BMG	production, engineering, mixing, mastering	November 10, 2019	ARIA #38
2019	Promotive	Tired	Single	Self Released	mastering	August 26, 2019	
2019	Lotus Eater	Second To None	Single	Hopeless Records	mixing, mastering	November 20, 2019	
2019	Lotus Eater	Second To None	Single	Hopeless Records	mixing, mastering	November 20, 2019	
2019	Fire Ex.	Stand Up Like A Taiwanese	Album	Fire On Music	mixing, mastering	December 10, 2019	
2019	Ashland	Over The Moon	Album	Rise Records	producing, engineering, mixing, mastering	December 12, 2019	
2019	Meg & Dia	December Darling	Album	Pure Noise Records	mastering	November 15, 2019	
2019	Fame On Fire	Her Eyes	Single	Hopeless Records	mixing, mastering	December 5, 2019	XM Octane #1
2019	Tiny Moving Parts	Breathe	Album	Hopeless Records	mixing, mastering	September 13, 2019	
2019	Boy Becomes Hero	Reverie	Album	Self Released	mixing, mastering	February 28, 2019	
2019	Dance Gavin Dance	Story Of My Bros (Acoustic) - Punk Goes Acoustic Vol 3	Single	Fearless Records	mixing	July 26, 2019	
2019	Dance Gavin Dance	Blood Wolf	Single	Rise Records	production, engineering, mixing, mastering	October 10, 2019	
2019	Dance Gavin Dance	Head Hunter	Single	Rise Records	production, engineering, mixing, mastering	March 22, 2019	
2019	Dance Gavin Dance	Acceptance Speech 2.0	Album	Rise Records	re-mixing, re-mastering	August 30, 2019	
2019	Royal Coda	Compassion	Album	Blue Swan Records	production, engineering, mixing, mastering	November 7, 2019	
2019	Issues	Beautiful Oblivion	Album	Rise Records	reamping, mixing, mastering	October 4, 2019	
2020	Survive Said The Prophet	Inside Your Head	Album	Sony Japan	drum tracking	January 15, 2020	Billboard Japan #9
2020	Osatia	All In Time Deluxe (tracks 8-13)	Album	We Are Triumphant	mastering	February 28, 2020	
2020	Derek Sanders	My Rock and Roll Heart	EP	Rise Records	mastering	February 14, 2020	
2020	Dune Rats	Hurry Up and Wait	Album	BMG	mastering	January 30, 2020	ARIA #1
2020	Adam In The Bayou	The Dude With Four Legs, Pt. 1	Single	The Foundation Agency	Mastering	May 22, 2020	
2020	Belmont	Reflections	EP	Pure Noise Records	Mastering	March 13, 2020	
2020	Capstan	Live Bait	Single	Fearless Records	Mastering	May 8, 2020	
2020	Arson Choir	Invisible Monsters	EP	War Against Records	Mastering	October 2, 2020	
2020	Currents	The Way It Ends	Album	SharpTone Records	Mastering	June 5, 2020	#2 Billboard Hard Rock Album
2020	Chapel	Mushy Gushy	Single	Rise Records	Mastering	May 29, 2020	
2020	Not A Toy	Antidote	Single	Fearless Records	production, engineering, mixing, mastering	July 28, 2020	
2020	Not A Toy	Quit Quitting	Single	Fearless Records	production, engineering, mixing, mastering	May 27, 2020	
2020	Not A Toy	J Cash	Single	Fearless Records	production, engineering, mixing, mastering	May 8, 2020	
2020	Nothing,Nowhere	one takes vol.1	Album	Fueled By Ramen	Mastering	July 10, 2020	
2020	Fame On Fire	LEVELS	Album	Hopeless Records	Mixing, Mastering	September 4, 2020	
2020	Nova Charisma	Exposition III	EP	Equal Vision Records	production, engineering, mixing, mastering	April 30, 2020	
2020	Broadside	Into the Raging Sea	Album	SharpTone Records	Mastering	July 24, 2020	
2020	Crown The Empire	7102010	Album	Rise Records	Mastering	July 10, 2020	
2020	Knuckle Puck	20/20	Album	Rise Records	Mastering	September 18, 2020	
2020	Misery Signals	Ultraviolet	Album	Basick Records	Mastering	August 7, 2020	
2020	Dance Gavin Dance	Afterburner	Album	Rise Records	production, engineering, mixing, mastering	April 24, 2020	#1 Billboard Current Album / #14 Top 200
2021	Eidola	The Architect	Album	Blue Swan Records, Rise Records	production, mixing, mastering	September 17, 2021	
2021	Gold Necklace	Gold Necklace	Album	Kill Iconic Records	Mastering	November 12, 2021	#197 Top 200
2022	Vagrants	Be Consumed	Album	Equal Vision Records	Mastering	April 29, 2022	
2022	Cheem	Guilty Pleasure	Album	Lonely Ghost Records	Mastering	July 22, 2022	
2022	Dance Gavin Dance	Jackpot Juicer	Album	Rise Records	production, engineering, mixing, mastering	July 29, 2022	#8 Top 200
2022	Priority Orange	Sol	EP	FFPS Records	Mastering	August 31, 2022	
2022	The Callous Daoboys	Celebrity Therapist	Album	MNRK Music Group / Modern Static Records	Mastering	September 2, 2022	
2022	Adam In The Bayou	Bon Ami	EP	The Foundation Agency	Mastering	October 14, 2022	
2024	Rosia'mor	Vignettes	EP	Amorosi Records	Mastering	February 9, 2024	
2024	Heathens	Post Party Depression	EP	Self Released	Mastering	March 19th, 2024	
2024	Eidola	Eviscerate	Album	Blue Swan Records, Rise Records	Mastering	April 12, 2024	
2024	With Sails Ahead	Infinite Void	Album	Self Released	Mastering	April 26, 2024	
2025	Yunger	Alive	EP	Negative Progression Records	Mastering	July 11, 2025	
2025	Chiodos	All's Well That Ends Well (20th Anniversary Edition)	Album	Sumerian Records	Mastering	July 25, 2025	
2025	Frightful Places	Spirits Are Up!	Single	Self Released	Mastering	August 29th, 2025	
2025	Frightful Places	Third Wheel	Single	Self Released	Mastering	September 19th, 2025	
2026	Heathens	Shed My Skin	Single	Self Released	Mastering	March 9th, 2026	
2026	Sinastra	Moonlight	Single	Self Released	Mastering	March 27, 2026	
2026	Heathens	Cherry Zip Tie	Single	Self Released	Mastering	April 23, 2026	
2026	Sinastra	Last Night On Earth	Single	Self Released	Mastering	May 14, 2026	
2026	Sinastra	Magik Skool Bus	Single	Self Released	Mastering	September 18, 2026	
