= Artificial Selection (album) =

Studio album by Dance Gavin Dance
- Released: June 8, 2018
- Recorded: 2017–18
- Studios: Interlace Audio, Portland, Oregon
- Genres: Post-hardcore; pop-punk; experimental rock; emo; math rock; alternative rock; funk rock
- Length: 51:44
- Label: Rise
- Producers: Dryw Owens; Erik Ron; Kris Crummett

Dance Gavin Dance chronology
Mothership (2016)	Artificial Selection (2018)	Afterburner (2020)

Singles from Artificial Selection
- 1. "Midnight Crusade" Released: April 4, 2018; 2. "Son of Robot" Released: May 4, 2018; 3. "Care" Released: May 25, 2018; 4. "Count Bassy" Released: June 5, 2018; 5. "Hair Song" Released: October 12, 2018

Professional ratings
Review scores
Source	Rating
PopMatters	7/10
Distorted Sound Mag	7/10
Punknews.org	1.5/5 stars

Artificial Selection is the eighth studio album by American rock band Dance Gavin Dance, released on June 8, 2018, on Rise Records. It is the follow-up to the band's seventh studio album, Mothership (2016) and is their third consecutive studio release with the same line-up. The album was produced by Kris Crummett, Erik Ron, and Dryw Owens, and was self-produced by Dance Gavin Dance, making it the first release by the band to feature more than one producer.

The album was supported by four singles; "Midnight Crusade", "Son of Robot", "Care", and "Count Bassy". To promote the album, the band toured as support on two of Underoath's 2018 North American tours, embarked on the Artificial Selection Tour, and performed at their own festival SwanFest. On May 31, 2019, the group released an instrumental version of the album to streaming and digital download platforms.

== Background ==
Following extensive touring in support of their seventh studio album, Mothership (2016), Dance Gavin Dance began writing and recording new material for their eighth studio album in 2017. The band released a studio cover of the Bruno Mars single "That's What I Like", for Punk Goes Pop Vol. 7, on June 1, 2017. Soon after, the group released the stand-alone single "Summertime Gladness" on June 15. After touring internationally with other musical groups such as The Contortionist, Hail the Sun, and Polyphia, among others, and appearing on 2017 Vans Warped Tour, the band hinted at recording their eighth studio album in October 2017. The group performed their seventh album, Mothership, in its entirety on The Mothership Tour in December 2017.

Dance Gavin Dance embarked on a headlining European and U.K. tour with American metalcore band Veil of Maya in March 2018.

== Composition and recording ==
The band wrote and recorded Artificial Selection beginning on October 17, 2017, at Interlace Audio Recording Studios in Portland, Oregon with producer Kris Crummett. The album was also produced by Erik Ron and Dryw Owens, in addition to Crummett and Dance Gavin Dance. Ron served as a mixing engineer on the track "Midnight Crusade" and Crummett served as a mixing engineer on "Son of Robot". The band's lead guitarist Will Swan is credited as an executive producer. Upon the album's announcement, clean vocalist Tilian Pearson confirmed that Kurt Travis is featured on the track "Shelf Life". Eidola vocalist and guitarist Andrew Wells, Strawberry Girls guitarist Zachary Garren, Secret Band guitarist Martin Bianchini, and Louie Baltazar are featured guitarists on the album. Wells also is a guest vocalist on the track "Evaporate".

In an interview with Alternative Press, Will Swan commented on the band's writing process for the album and how it differed from previous recording sessions. "A lot of [this record] was written for singles, so it was written a little differently than some of the previous, instrumentally." Swan continues, "I wrote a lot of it for Warped Tour last year when we were trying to write a good single, so I wrote, like, 10 songs and we chose one ["Summertime Gladness"], but I really liked those other songs [...] so I kept them in my back pocket." Swan also expressed how he experimented with effects pedals on the album. "Guitar always sounds like guitar to most people and I like to try and make sure that when you listen to my stuff you don't know if it's a keyboard or a synth or some weird effect, because I'm trying to come out of left field." Tilian Pearson explained his lyrical writing process for the album, describing it as "more personal" than on Mothership (2016) and Instant Gratification (2015). Pearson expressed that his vocal inspiration for the album derived from Paramore's fifth studio album, After Laughter, and drew melodic influence from 1990s R&B groups such as Destiny's Child and TLC.

== Promotion ==
Artificial Selection was announced by the band on March 23, 2018, revealing pre-order packages, the album cover art, and track listing.

The band released four singles and three music videos prior to the album's release. On April 4, 2018, the band released the lead single "Midnight Crusade", accompanied with its music video. Two days later, "Midnight Crusade" was made available on Spotify and Apple Music. On May 4, 2018, the band released the second single, "Son of Robot". The third single, "Care", accompanied with its music video, were each released on May 25. The fourth single, "Count Bassy", was released on June 5, 2018, along with its music video.

On May 31, 2019, the band released an instrumental version of the studio album.

=== Tour ===
Dance Gavin Dance toured as support on American post-hardcore band Underoath's No Fix American Tour from April 20 to May 26, 2018. The group announced a headlining tour with I See Stars, Erra, and Sianvar, on March 28, 2018, that spanned from May 26 to June 21, 2018, in North America. They also performed at Rock on the Range.

The band toured as support on Underoath's Erase Me Tour in November and December 2018, along with The Plot In You. An Australian headlining tour was announced on November 5, 2018, which spanned from February 27 to March 5, 2019, with support from Veil of Maya.

On January 8, 2019, the group announced The Artificial Selection Tour, which took place from March 30 to May 12, 2019, with support from Periphery, Don Broco, Hail the Sun, Covet and Thousand Below.

== Track listing ==
All tracks are written by Will Swan, Tilian Pearson, Jon Mess, Tim Feerick, and Matt Mingus.

Artificial Selection – digital download
No.	Title	Length
1.	"Son of Robot"	3:58
2.	"Midnight Crusade"	3:29
3.	"Suspended in This Disaster"	3:19
4.	"Care"	4:25
5.	"Count Bassy"	4:05
6.	"Flash"	3:07
7.	"The Rattler"	3:22
8.	"Shelf Life" (featuring Kurt Travis)	3:08
9.	"Slouch"	3:10
10.	"Story of My Bros"	3:14
11.	"Hair Song"	3:03
12.	"Gospel Burnout"	4:08
13.	"Bloodsucker"	4:19
14.	"Evaporate" (featuring Andrew Wells)	4:57
Total length:		51:44

Notes

- "Bloodsucker" does not feature Will Swan on guitar and rather features Martin Bianchini and Andrew Wells on lead and rhythm guitar, respectively.
- "Evaporate" features various reprises from past songs.

== Credits and personnel ==
Dance Gavin Dance

- Tilian Pearson – clean vocals
- Jon Mess – unclean vocals
- Will Swan – lead guitar
- Tim Feerick – bass guitar
- Matthew Mingus – drums, percussion

Additional personnel

- Zachary Garren – guitar (on "Care")
- Martin Bianchini – guitar (on "Midnight Crusade", "The Rattler", "Bloodsucker")
- Andrew Wells – guitar (on "Hair Song", "Bloodsucker", "Evaporate"), guest vocals (on "Evaporate"), backing vocals (on "The Rattler")
- Louie Baltazar – guitar (on "Suspended in This Disaster")
- Kurt Travis – guest vocals (on "Shelf Life")
- Jessica Esposito – flute, kazoo
- Mattias Adolfsson – album cover illustration
- Alan Ashcraft – art direction, layout

Production

- Kris Crummett – producer, mixing engineer (on "Son of Robot")
- Erik Ron – producer, mixing engineer (on "Midnight Crusade")
- Dryw Owens – producer, mixing engineer (on all except "Son of Robot", "Midnight Crusade")
- Will Swan – executive producer
- Anthony Reeder – additional engineer
- Matthew Lang – additional engineer
- Joshua Unitt – additional engineer
- Scott Smith – additional engineer
- Ted Jensen – mastering engineer

== Charts ==
=== Weekly charts ===
Chart (2018)	Peak position
UK Album Downloads (Official Charts)	74
UK Independent Albums (Official Charts)	32
UK Rock & Metal Albums (Official Charts)	23
US Billboard 200	15
US Top Rock Albums (Billboard)	2

=== Year-end charts ===
Chart (2018)	Position
US Top Rock Albums (Billboard)	99
