= Gold Necklace (album) =

Studio album by Gold Necklace
- Released: November 12, 2021
- Recorded: 2021
- Studio: Pus Cavern, Sacramento, California, U.S.
- Genre: Progressive rock; jazz-fusion
- Length: 29:50
- Label: Kill Iconic Records
- Producer: Josh Benton

Singles from Gold Necklace
- 1. "Vibe with Me" Released: September 22, 2021; 2. "I Felt It Too" Released: October 8, 2021; 3. "Tootsie Roll" Released: November 5, 2021

Gold Necklace is the self-titled debut studio album by American progressive rock duo Gold Necklace, composed of American musicians Kurt Travis (vocals) and Brandon Ewing (bass and lead guitar). The album was released on November 12, 2021, through the independent record label Kill Iconic Records, a label owned by Hail the Sun frontman Donovan Melero. Produced by Josh Benton, the album was written and recorded at Pus Cavern Studios in Sacramento, California between March and July 2021. Joseph Arrington wrote, performed, and recorded drums for the album. Gold Necklace is a progressive rock and jazz-fusion album with influences of funk, soul, R&B, and jazz.

The album was preceded by three singles. The lead single, "Vibe with Me", was released on September 22, 2021. The second and third singles, "I Felt It Too" and "Tootsie Roll", were each released in October and November, respectively. In support of the album, singer and songwriter Kurt Travis performed select songs from the album, despite being billed under his name rather than Gold Necklace, while touring with Hail the Sun in the United States in September and October 2021. The duo toured on three dates on The Fall of Troy's US headlining tour in December and plan to tour in 2022.

== Background ==
Following his departure from American post-hardcore band A Lot Like Birds, Kurt Travis began collaborating with other musicians and forming other musical projects. This included the math rock trio Eternity Forever, which also consisted of Strawberry Girls drummer Ben Rosett and former Chon touring member Brandon Ewing. On April 20, 2017, the trio released their only extended play (EP), Fantasy, before disbanding a few months later. Travis went on to join the post-hardcore band Royal Coda with his former A Lot Like Birds bandmate and drummer Joseph Arrington and former Stolas and Sianvar guitarist Sergio Medina. With Royal Coda, they released their self-titled debut studio album Royal Coda in April 2018 and their second studio album, Compassion, in November 2019, each on Blue Swan Records. Arrington also wrote and recorded drums for Travis' 2019 solo studio album, There's a Place I Want to Take You. In 2021, Travis and Ewing began collaborating once more and named their project Gold Necklace and recruited Arrington as a session member to write and record drums for their debut studio album.

== Recording ==
Recording sessions for the album spanned from March to July 2021 at Pus Cavern Studios in Sacramento, California, the same recording studio where bands such as Cake, Deftones, Allegiance, and Dance Gavin Dance have recorded records. Josh Benton, formerly of the post-hardcore band Dance Gavin Dance, produced and engineered the album while Kris Crummett served as mastering engineer at Interlace Audio Recording Studios in Portland, Oregon.

== Track listing ==
No.	Title	Length
1.	"I Felt It Too"	3:14
2.	"Tootsie Roll"	3:15
3.	"Coast to Coast"	3:12
4.	"Just the Right Way"	3:22
5.	"Padme"	3:43
6.	"Near, but So Far Gone"	1:45
7.	"Call Me Back"	2:59
8.	"You and Me in Oceanside"	3:26
9.	"Vibe with Me"	3:31
10.	"Lullaby"	1:19
Total length:		29:50

== Credits and personnel ==
Gold Necklace

- Kurt Travis – lead vocals
- Brandon Ewing – lead guitar, bass guitar

Additional musicians

- Joseph Arrington – drums, percussion

Production

- Josh Benton – producer, mixing engineer
- Kris Crummett – mastering engineer

== Charts ==
Chart (2021)	Peak position
US Billboard 200	197
US Heatseekers Albums (Billboard)	62
