= There's a Place I Want to Take You =

There’s A Place I Want To Take You

Studio album by Kurt Travis
- Released: May 17, 2019
- Recorded: 2017–2019
- Studio: VuDu Recording Studios (Port Jefferson, New York)
- Genre: Alternative rock; emo; indie rock; indie pop
- Length: 36:17
- Label: Blue Swan Records; Esque Records
- Producer: Mike Watts

Kurt Travis chronology
Kurt Travis/Paul Travis Split (EP) (2016)	There’s A Place I Want To Take You (2019)	Fun & Games (EP) (2021)

Singles from The Skeptic
- 1. "Easy Peasy" Released: April 16, 2019; 2. "Best Way" Released: May 3, 2019

There’s A Place I Want To Take You is the second studio album by American recording artist Kurt Travis, released on May 17, 2019, through Blue Swan Records and his own label, Esque Records. It also serves as a follow-up to his debut studio album, Everything Is Beautiful (2014). The album's lyrical content deals with heartbreak and emotional turmoil while, sonically, Travis pursued folk-inspired songwriting, using elements of indie rock, electronica, dream pop, and power pop. It was produced by Mike Watts and recorded at VuDu Recording Studios in Port Jefferson, New York and features a guest appearance from singer-rapper Andrés on two tracks.

The album was preceded by two singles. "Easy Peasy", was released as the lead single on April 16, 2019. The second single, "Best Way", was released on May 3. None of the singles were released to digital or streaming services until the day of the album's release. A headlining album release tour in support of the album, co-headlined with singer-rapper Andrés, took place in May and June 2019, with support from post-hardcore bands Makari and Adventurer.

== Background ==
Kurt Travis released his debut studio album, Everything Is Beautiful, on May 14, 2014, on Blue Swan Records, a record label owned by American guitarist Will Swan of the rock band Dance Gavin Dance. Travis toured in support of the release in North America from May 14 to June 7, 2014, with support from American musical groups Hotel Books and So Much Light. Travis described Everything Is Beautiful as mixture of alternative rock, indie pop, new wave, electronica, folk, and R&B. The album was described as ambient and "DGD-influenced" by Sputnikmusic. The album featured collaborations with Joseph Arrington, who performed drums, and Zachary Garren, who performed guitar. His former A Lot Like Birds bandmate Cory Lockwood was also a featured vocalist on the album. In 2015, Travis launched his own independent record label, Eqsue Records, and signed a number of independent rock bands, whom he managed. In July 2015, he released a new song, "Switchblade", featuring Strawberry Girls.

Travis announced his departure from A Lot Like Birds on March 2, 2016. The following year, he helped form the American math rock trio Eternity Forever, alongside Strawberry Girls drummer Ben Rosett and former Chon bass guitarist Brandon Ewing. The group released one extended play (EP), Fantasy, before departing the following year. Travis also formed the post-hardcore duo Push Over with The Fall of Troy frontman Thomas Erak. The same year, he joined the rock band Royal Coda, alongside former Stolas guitarist Sergio Medina and Joe Arrington; former Dance Gavin Dance bass guitarist Jason Ellis joined thereafter, becoming a four-piece. The band released their self-titled debut studio album, Royal Coda, in April 2018.

== Recording ==
Kurt Travis began to tease the release of There's A Place I Want To Take You on his website with artwork and merchandise, in 2016. In January 2019, it was revealed that Arrington was recording drums and percussion for the album.

The album was recorded at VuDu Recording Studios in Port Jefferson, New York throughout a two-year period with producer Mike Watts and engineer Dominic Nastasi. Recording for the album finished on February 13, 2019. Travis wrote and performed lead and rhythm guitar, bass guitar, and vocals for the album while Royal Coda drummer Joe Arrington recorded drums and percussion. Matthew Tucker composed, performed synthesizers, recorded and mixed the track "Best Way". American singer-songwriter Andrés is featured on two tracks, "Too Much Space" and "Hometown".

== Promotion ==
On April 11, 2019, Kurt Travis announced a tour in support of the album, which took place in May and June 2019, with support from American post-hardcore bands Adventurer and Makari.

On April 16, he released the album's lead single, "Easy Peasy", accompanied with its music video. Another song, "Best Way", was released on YouTube on May 3, 2019.

== Track listing ==
No.	Title	Length
1.	"Too Much Space" (featuring Andrés)	5:16
2.	"Easy Peasy"	2:47
3.	"Tomorrow Will Be Fine"	4:14
4.	"Hometown" (featuring Andrés)	3:26
5.	"It's You"	3:06
6.	"We'll Probably Be Alright"	3:53
7.	"Best Way"	4:32
8.	"Easy To Decide"	3:16
9.	"Still Won't Listen"	3:48
10.	"Lewis"	3:59
Total length:		36:17

== Credits and personnel ==
- Kurt Travis – lead vocals, composer, lead guitar, rhythm guitar, bass guitar
- Joseph Arrington – drums, percussion
- Matthew Tucker – synthesizers, mixing engineer
- Dominic Nastasi – audio engineer
- Mike Watts – producer, mix engineer
