= Compassion (Royal Coda album) =

Studio album by Royal Coda
- Released: November 7, 2019
- Recorded: 2019
- Studio: VuDu Recording Studios (Port Jefferson, New York); Interlace Audio (Portland, Oregon)
- Genre: Post-hardcore; experimental rock
- Length: 30:06
- Label: Blue Swan Records
- Producer: Kris Crummett

Royal Coda chronology
Royal Coda (2018)	Compassion (2019)	To Only A Few At First (2022)

Singles from Compassion
- 1. "Numbing Agent" Released: September 12, 2019; 2. "Becoming the Memory" Released: September 30, 2019; 3. "The Innocence Of" Released: October 15, 2019

Compassion is the second full-length studio album by American post-hardcore band Royal Coda. It was released on November 7, 2019, on Blue Swan Records, and serves as a follow-up to their self-titled debut studio album. It is the band's first album to feature guitarist Will Swan and was produced by Kris Crummett.

The lead single, "Numbing Agent", was released on September 12, 2019 with two more singles following; "Becoming the Memory" and "The Innocence Of". In support of the album, the band toured as support on Hail the Sun's The Mental Knife US Tour in September and October 2019 and was scheduled to tour as support Dance Gavin Dance's 2020 spring tour, but was later cancelled due to the COVID-19 pandemic.

== Background ==
After wanting to pursue a musical project that would involve various different musicians, American musician Sergio Medina, formerly of Stolas and Sianvar, formed Royal Coda with former A Lot Like Birds drummer Joseph Arrington and former A Lot Like Birds and Dance Gavin Dance vocalist Kurt Travis. The band released their self-titled debut studio album on April 27, 2018, on Blue Swan Records. In 2018, the band toured as support on American musician Tilian's US solo tour in August and September, recruiting The Fall of Troy frontman Thomas Erak and former Dance Gavin Dance bass guitarist Jason Ellis as touring members. The following year, the group embarked on their first headlining US tour in March with support from American rock band Body Thief.

== Recording ==
In June 2018, two months after the release of Royal Coda's debut studio album, drummer Joseph Arrington revealed that writing sessions for their second studio album had begun with guitarist Sergio Medina. Recording sessions took place at VuDu Recording Sessions in Long Island, New York with vocal production from Mike Watts and Dominic Nastasi, and at Interlace Audio in Portland, Oregon with producer Kris Crummett. It is the band's first studio album to feature Will Swan on guitar. The album features guest features from Donovan Melero (of Hail the Sun and Nova Charisma), Carlo Marquez (formerly of Stolas), and Kayla Connick.

== Promotion ==
On September 12, 2019, Royal Coda released the album's lead single, "Numbing Agent", accompanied with its music video and the album's announcement. The second single, "Becoming the Memory", was released to digital download and streaming on September 30. "The Innocence Of" was released as the third single on October 15.

In support of Compassion, the group toured as a supporting act on American post-hardcore band Hail the Sun's The Mental Knife Tour, in North America, from September 13 to October 13, 2019, along with Strawberry Girls and VIS. The group was set to tour as support on Dance Gavin Dance's US headlining 2020 tour from March 12 to April 25, but the tour was later cancelled due to the COVID-19 pandemic.

== Track listing ==
No.	Title	Length
1.	"Ruby Leaf"	4:23
2.	"All In Question"	3:56
3.	"Numbing Agent"	3:59
4.	"The Innocence Of"	4:08
5.	"Becoming The Memory"	3:43
6.	"Arms Race for God’s Grace"	4:12
7.	"Don’t Stay Long"	4:13
8.	"The Innocence Of (Reprise)"	1:32
Total length:		30:06

== Credits ==
Royal Coda

- Sergio Medina – guitar, programming
- Kurt Travis – lead vocals
- Joseph Arrington – drums, percussion
- Will Swan – guitar, bass guitar

Additional personnel

- Kris Crummett – producer, mixing and mastering engineer
- Mike Watts- vocal production (on tracks 2–4)
- Dominic Nastasi – production (on tracks 2–4)
- Carlo Marquez – composer (on track 2)
- Donovan Melero – guest vocals (on track 7), bass guitar (on tracks 2–6)
- Kayla Connick – guest vocals (on track 8)
- Lewes Herriot – cover art
