= Stay Lost =

Studio album by Sianvar
- Released: August 5, 2016
- Recorded: 2015–16
- Studio: Little Russia Recording Studios in North Highlands, California
- Genre: Post-hardcore; experimental rock; progressive rock
- Length: 38:28
- Label: Blue Swan Records
- Producer: Dryw Owens

Sianvar chronology
Sianvar (EP) (2014)	Stay Lost (2016)

Singles from Stay Lost
- 1. "Omniphobia" Released: June 28, 2016; 2. "Psychosis Succumbing" Released: July 14, 2016; 3. "BedRoots" Released: July 25, 2016

Stay Lost is the debut full-length studio album by American post-hardcore band Sianvar, released on August 5, 2016, on Blue Swan Records. The album serves as a follow-up to the band's 2014 debut EP, Sianvar. It is the band's only studio album to feature bass guitarist Michael Franzino and is the final release before the group announced its indefinite hiatus in April 2019.

== Background and recording ==
Sianvar consists of Dance Gavin Dance guitarist Will Swan, former A Lot Like Birds drummer Joseph Arrington and guitarist Michael Franzino, Stolas guitarist Sergio Medina, and Hail the Sun vocalist and drummer Donovan Melero. The band debuted with the single "Sick Machine" on November 11, 2013. They released a self-titled EP on January 5, 2014.

Stay Lost was written and recorded over the course of two years during 2015 and 2016. The band recorded the album with producer Dryw Owens at Little Russia Recording Studios in North Highlands, California.

== Promotion ==
Sianvar announced the album on June 28, 2016 and released the lead single "Omniphobia". On the same day, Alternative Press premiered the music video for "Omniphobia", which was directed by Steve Pedulla, rhythm guitarist of American post-hardcore band Thursday.

On July 14, 2016, the band released the second single, "Psychosis Succumbing".

On July 25, the album's third and final single, "BedRoots", was released.

== Tour ==
In support of the album, Sianvar announced a headlining tour, the Stay Lost Tour, which took place in the United States, beginning at the Red House in Walnut Creek, California and concluding at Strummers in Fresno, California. The tour consisted of 32 dates total. My Iron Lung and Save Us From the Archon served as support.

== Track listing ==
All track titles and durations taken from Bandcamp.

No.	Title	Length
1.	"Stay Lost"	4:31
2.	"Omniphobia"	4:57
3.	"Anticoagulant"	3:48
4.	"Psychosis Succumbing"	3:05
5.	"Foxholes and Deities"	3:31
6.	"BedRoots"	4:46
7.	"Coordinate Love"	2:59
8.	"1100 Days"	4:41
9.	"Don't Carry This"	3:58
10.	"Stay Scared"	4:52
Total length:		38:28

== Credits and personnel ==
Sianvar

- Will Swan - guitar
- Donovan Melero - lead vocals
- Sergio Medina - guitar
- Joseph Arrington - drums, percussion
- Michael Franzino - bass

Production

- Dryw Owens - producer, mixing engineer
- Kris Crummett - mastering engineer
- Colin Frangicetto - album cover artwork
- Spencer Haley - layout design

== Chart performance ==
Upon its release, Stay Lost debuted at No. 140 on the US Billboard 200, No. 36 on Top Rock Albums, No. 23 on Independent Albums, No. 13 on Hard Rock Albums, and No. 5 on the Top New Artists chart.
