= Kurt Travis =

American musician (born 1984)

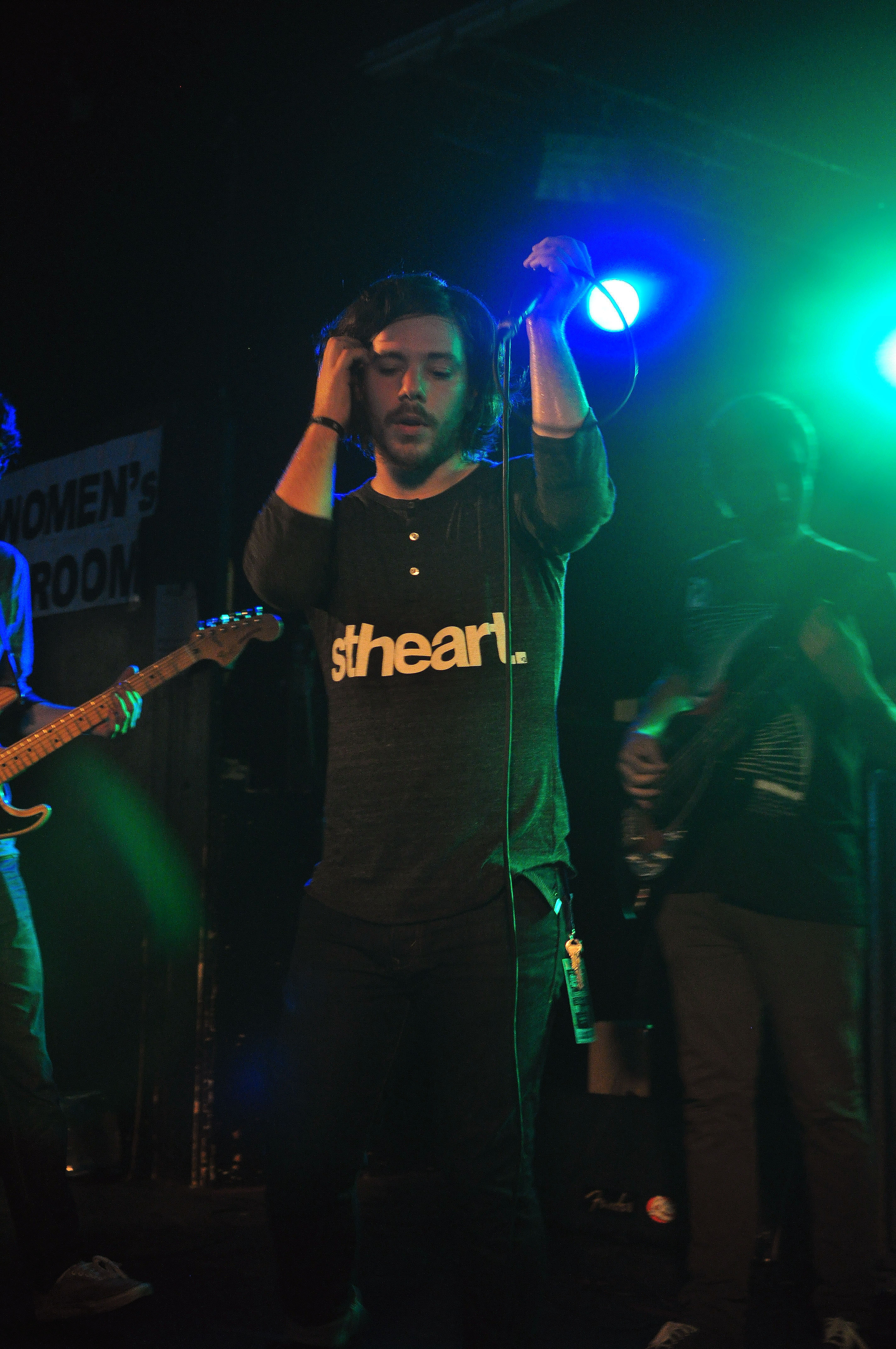
- Travis performing with Dance Gavin Dance in 2010

Background information
- Born: Kurt Thomas; January 16, 1984 (age 42); Scottsdale, Arizona, U.S.
- Origin: Sacramento, California, U.S.
- Genres: Post-hardcore; math rock; experimental rock; emo; progressive rock; indie rock; alternative rock; electronica; indie pop; folk
- Occupations: Singer; musician; songwriter
- Instruments: Vocals; guitar
- Years active: 2003–present
- Labels: Rise; Doghouse; Equal Vision; Blue Swan; Esque; Tragic Hero
- Member of: Royal Coda; A Lot Like Birds; Push Over; Gold Necklace
- Formerly of: Dance Gavin Dance; Eternity Forever; O! the Joy; No Not Constant; There & Back Again; Five Minute Ride

Kurt Travis (born January 16, 1984) is an American singer, musician, and songwriter from Sacramento, California. He is currently part of the post-hardcore bands Royal Coda, A Lot Like Birds, and Push Over and the math rock duo Gold Necklace, and was formerly a vocalist in the post-hardcore band Dance Gavin Dance.

Travis began his musical career in 2001. He joined post-hardcore band Five Minute Ride, releasing the extended plays (EPs), Bathroom Walls... Lipstick Secrets in 2003, and The World Needs Convincing of All That It's Missing, on Rise Records, in 2005 before disbanding later that year. Travis later formed the folk group There & Back Again in 2006. Following these two groups, Travis helped form the band No Not Constant in July 2007, later disbanding the same year. In 2008, Travis became the lead vocalist for rock band O! the Joy, releasing one studio album, Zen Mode (2008).

Following his underground success, Travis replaced Jonny Craig as clean vocalist in rock band Dance Gavin Dance. With the group, he released two studio albums, Dance Gavin Dance (2008) and Happiness (2009). After two years, it was revealed that Travis departed from Dance Gavin Dance, in 2010. The following year, Travis joined as a vocalist in the post-hardcore group A Lot Like Birds, releasing the studio albums Conversation Piece (2011) and No Place (2013) on Equal Vision Records, before departing in 2016. He briefly joined the math rock trio Eternity Forever, in 2016. He also formed the post-hardcore duo Push Over, along with The Fall of Troy's Thomas Erak, releasing a demo EP in February 2017. In 2018, he joined Royal Coda, having released three studio albums, Royal Coda (2018), Compassion (2019), and To Only A Few At First (2022).

As a solo artist, Travis has released three EPs, one split EP, and two full-length studio albums; Everything Is Beautiful (2014) and There's a Place I Want to Take You (2019). He launched his own record label, Esque Records, in 2016.

== Early life ==
Kurt Travis was born in Scottsdale, Arizona. Both of his parents were gymnasts, and his father was three-time world champion Kurt Thomas. Travis changed his surname from Thomas to Travis following his mother's remarriage.

Travis grew up in a musical family. His grandparents inspired him to pursue guitar. At a young age, he was inspired by Counting Crows, Elliott Smith, and Heatmiser.

== Solo career ==
=== 2012–14: Wha Happen? and Everything Is Beautiful ===
During his time as a vocalist in American post-hardcore band A Lot Like Birds, Kurt Travis began pursuing a solo career, in 2012. On January 24, 2012, he released his debut solo debut extended play (EP), Wha Happen? on Doghouse Records, a DIY lo-fi and indie rock project consisting of seven tracks. In support of its release, Travis performed a number of various one-off concerts with former Dance Gavin Dance vocalist Jonny Craig, Never Shout Never, Hail the Sun, and The Seeking from May 2012 to April 2013.

On March 12, 2013, he released his self-titled second solo EP on Equal Vision Records. The following year, he released his debut studio album, Everything Is Beautiful, on May 14, on Blue Swan Records. The album was produced by former Dance Gavin Dance guitarist Josh Benton and mastered by Kris Crummett, while featuring guest appearances from Strawberry Girls lead guitarist Zachary Garren and A Lot Like Birds members Cory Lockwood and Joseph Arrington. Its lead single, "Brain Lord", was released on April 22, 2014, accompanied with its music video. To promote the album, Travis embarked on a headlining US tour with support from Hotel Books and So Much Light, beginning on May 14 and concluding June 7, 2014. On July 26, 2015, Travis released the single "Switchblade", featuring Strawberry Girls.

=== 2015–19: There's A Place I Want to Take You ===
In August 2015, he launched his own independent record label, Esque Records, based in Sacramento, California. On the label, he signed American singer-songwriter Paul Travis and released a split EP with the musician on February 1, 2016. On March 2, 2016, he announced his departure from A Lot Like Birds. In March 2016, Las Vegas based post-hardcore band Amarionette released the single "Get It Right", featuring Kurt Travis, with its music video premiering in July and later appearing on the group's studio album Repeating History. Travis toured as a solo artist with Tilian and Jonny Craig in the US from April 22 to May 15, 2016, with support from Myke Terry and Victory Heights. Following this tour, he embarked on his first solo UK tour with headliner The Appleseed Cast and other support Listener and Atlas: Empire, in June.

On May 31, 2017, he released the solo track "No Apologies", featuring Strawberry Girls. The track was produced, mixed and mastered by Strawberry Girls drummer Ben Rosett at Spirit Vision Records. On October 8, 2017, musician Kyle Ekstrom released the song "Easy", featuring Travis as a guest vocalist. On December 25, 2017, singer Andrés released the song "Multiverse", which features Travis on vocals. The next month, American math rock band Find Yourself released the song "Conjured Conjecture", which also features Travis. In November 2018, Boy Becomes Hero released the collaborative single "Delectation", with Travis on vocals. In September 2018, he announced a solo US headlining tour with support from I the Mighty's Brent Walsh, Makari and Televangelist, which took place from October 30 to November 18.

On April 11, 2019, Travis announced an album release tour for his second solo studio album, which took place between May 17 and June 23, 2019. The same month, Travis released the single "Easy Peasy", on April 16, along with its music video. On May 17, 2019, he released his second studio album, There's A Place I Want To Take You, on Blue Swan Records and Esque Records. In support of the album, he embarked on numerous solo tours with Andrés, Makari, Adventurer, and Body Thief. In 2021, he will tour as support on Hail the Sun's New Age Filth tour.

=== 2020–present: Fun & Games EP ===
A compilation EP of demos and B-sides from past recording sessions with guitarist Zachary Garren, titled Fun & Games, was released for streaming and digital download on May 28, 2021.

From January 20 to February 3, 2022, Travis embarked on a headlining solo US tour, with support from Amarionette, Sani Bronco, and Catbamboo. Due to unforeseen circumstances, the final four tour dates were cancelled.

== History ==
=== 2001–08: Five Minute Ride, No Not Constant, and O! the Joy ===
In 2001, while still a senior in high school, Kurt Travis was offered to join the Cameron Park based post-hardcore band Five Minute Ride, after the members discovered him at an open mic event in Placerville, California. The band's 2003 debut EP, Bathroom Walls... Lipstick Secrets, was released on promoter Eric Rushing's now-defunct 720 Records. Their follow-up EP, The World Needs Convincing of All That It's Missing, was recorded during the summer of 2004 with producer Kurt Ballou at Godcity Studios in Salem, MA, and released in 2005 through Rise Records. The group later disbanded in October 2005 after many of the original members, who formed the band during high school, had left for college.

No Not Constant, another post-hardcore project based in Sacramento, California, consisting of Kurt Travis, Julian Loy, Tony Marks, Josh Benton, Alex Fleshman and Dale Arseneau, formed in 2007. The band was described as a "nu-jazz" and "indie pop" group and were heavily praised throughout the Northern California music scene. The band was short-lived and disbanded the same year.

After numerous trial and errors with Five Minute Ride and No Not Constant, as well as his folk music project There & Back Again, he joined the post-hardcore band O! the Joy. With the band, he released one full-length studio album, titled Zen Mode (2008), which was recorded at Tiny Telephone Studios in San Francisco, California. Despite local success, the group disbanded the same year.

=== 2008–10: Dance Gavin Dance ===
Briefly following Jonny Craig's departure from American post-hardcore band Dance Gavin Dance in November 2007, Kurt Travis replaced Craig as clean vocalist. Travis' first tour with the group took place from January 16 to February 22, 2008, co-headlined with metalcore band Poison the Well. The band released their second studio album, Dance Gavin Dance, on August 19, 2008 on Rise Records. In support of its release, the group co-headlined a summer tour with post-hardcore band A Static Lullaby from July to August 2008. The band toured as support on Senses Fail's US tour in October and November 2008.

On March 20, 2009, the band performed at South by South West in Austin, Texas. They performed on the first half of the 2009 Vans Warped Tour. On June 9, 2009, Dance Gavin Dance released their third studio album, also the second and final studio album with Travis, Happiness, just ten months after the release of their self-titled second album. They toured with Emarosa, Of Mice & Men, Tides of Man and Of Machines from September to October 2009. In February 2010, the band performed at Soundwave in Australia and at Bamboozle Festival in March 2010. In August 2010, the band announced Kurt Travis' departure from the band, who was later replaced by original vocalist Jonny Craig. A few weeks later, it was revealed Travis was kicked out of the group, however the split resulted in "no bad blood" between members.

On October 18, 2010, the band released its debut live album, Live at Bamboozle 2010. It was the final release to feature Kurt Travis as lead vocalist.

After Craig's second departure from Dance Gavin Dance, Kurt Travis and Lower Definition vocalist Matt Geise temporarily filled in as clean vocalists on their US headlining tour with A Lot Like Birds and Just Like Vinyl in February and March 2012.

Dance Gavin Dance announced its ten-year anniversary tour, taking place from November 14 to December 18, 2015, with support from A Lot Like Birds, Slaves, Dayshell and Strawberry Girls. On the tour, both Travis and Craig traded off as clean vocalist performing with the band during their set. The group embarked on a European leg of the ten-year anniversary tour with Travis and Craig as support in November 2016.

On June 8, 2018, the band released their eighth studio album, Artificial Selection, which features the song "Shelf Life", featuring Travis as a guest vocalist. This makes it the singer's first time appearing on a Dance Gavin Dance track since October 2010.

=== 2011–2016, 2024-present: A Lot Like Birds ===
After his departure from Dance Gavin Dance in August 2010, post-hardcore band A Lot Like Birds announced that Kurt Travis had joined the band as second vocalist on January 9, 2011. With the band, they signed to Doghouse Records and released their second studio album, Conversation Piece, on October 11, 2011. In January and February 2012, the band headlined a tour with Decoder and Just Like Vinyl in the US. From November 2 to December 9, 2012, the group toured as support on the Rock Yourself to Sleep Tour with Dance Gavin Dance and I the Mighty in the US.

A Lot Like Birds signed with Equal Vision Records and announced their third studio album. The band released No Place, their second and final studio album with Kurt Travis in the band, on October 29, 2013. In support of the album, the group embarked on a tour with Sianvar and Stolas, which took place from January 8 to February 2, 2014. They toured on the 2014 Vans Warped Tour from June to August. The group toured as support on Enter Shikari's US Mindsweep Tour from March 23 to April 28, 2015. A Lot Like Birds toured on Dance Gavin Dance's ten year anniversary tour in November and December 2015, in the United States, along with Slaves, Dayshell, and Strawberry Girls. This was the final tour to feature Kurt Travis before his departure on February 20, 2016.

On May 6, 2018, Travis reunited with the group to perform at their final concert before disbanding. When A Lot Like Birds reunited in 2024, Travis was confirmed to once again be a member of the band's lineup.

=== 2016–17: Eternity Forever ===
Eternity Forever was an American math rock supergroup composed of Strawberry Girls drummer Ben Rosett, former CHON bassist Brandon Ewing, and Kurt Travis. The trio formed in Carmel, California in December 2016. The group reportedly recorded their debut studio album in the first week of December at Spirit Vision Studios in Carmel. On January 25, 2017, the group released the single "Fantasy", announcing their debut EP, Fantasy, which was released on Spirit Vision Records on April 20, 2017. Another single, "Letting Go", was released on February 28, 2017. The project was discontinued after their first and only performance at Concert in the Park in Sacramento due to conflicts within the group.

=== 2017–present: Push Over ===
A post-hardcore musical group, consisting of Kurt Travis and The Fall of Troy vocalist and guitarist Thomas Erak, named Push Over, was revealed on January 29, 2017. Travis announced that the duo was composing new material for an upcoming release in 2017. A demo EP was released on February 5, 2017.

Erak joined Travis' post-hardcore band Royal Coda as a touring guitarist and backing vocalist in August 2018, however dropped off halfway through the tour. It was speculated the duo was on hiatus as Erak was focusing on his solo career and Travis was focusing on his respective musical endeavors, but it was confirmed in February 2019 that the group will release new material. In January 2020, the group released the single "1NE", from their upcoming debut studio album.

=== 2018–present: Royal Coda ===
On January 28, 2018, Blue Swan Records confirmed that American music trio Royal Coda signed to its label. The band consists of A Lot Like Birds drummer Joe Arrington and Stolas and Sianvar guitarist Sergio Medina, along with Kurt Travis as vocalist. The group revealed that they finished recording their debut studio album on January 29, with a tentative release date in the spring 2018.

Royal Coda released their debut song, "Anything to Save", as the lead single off their upcoming debut studio album, on February 16, 2018. They released their self-titled debut studio album on April 27, 2018.

The band toured as support on Tilian's headlining solo U.S. tour in August and September 2018. The band's first headlining tour is set to take place from March 14 to March 30, 2019, in the United States, with support from Body Thief.

A third LP, To Only A Few At First, was released in 2022. Royal Coda supported Travis' former band Dance Gavin Dance on their 2022 "An Evening With Friends" tour. The tour also saw Travis perform as a part of Dance Gavin Dance again for the first time in years, sharing clean vocal duties with Andrew Wells in the wake of Tilian Pearson's departure from the band.

=== 2021: Gold Necklace ===
Gold Necklace is a progressive rock duo consisting of Kurt Travis and Brandon Ewing. This is the second project the two have been a part of together since the math rock trio Eternity Forever. Their debut song, "Vibe with Me", was released on September 15, 2021 and their self-titled debut studio album, released on November 12 on Kill Iconic Records, a label owned by Hail the Sun's Donovan Melero. Although presented as a duo, Royal Coda drummer Joseph Arrington wrote and recorded drums on the album.

== Business ventures and other endeavors ==
In August 2015, Travis launched his own independent record label Esque Records. Travis said he was inspired to begin a record label due to wanting to support artists "while touring as a solo artist and with A Lot Like Birds." Originally, the label's roster included a variety of indie rock and math rock bands including Rome Hero Foxes, Lemix J. Buckley, Floral, Amarionette, and In Angles. In the fall of 2016, Travis announced the first and only Esque Records Tour, which took place from September 29 to October 26 with support from Strawberry Girls, Amarionette, and Lemix J. Buckley.

In 2021, Travis launched Big Wave Industries, an independently owned company purposed for selling merchandise for indie bands including post-hardcore bands Adventurer and Body Thief.

== Discography ==
As Kurt Travis

- Wha Happen? (EP) (Doghouse, 2012)
- Kurt Travis (EP) (Equal Vision, 2013)
- Everything Is Beautiful (Blue Swan Records, 2014)
- Kurt Travis/Paul Travis Split (EP) (Esque Records, 2016)
- There's A Place I Want To Take You (Blue Swan Records, 2019)
- Fun & Games (with Zachary Garren) (2021)
- Anywhere’s Better (Born Losers Records 2026)

With Five Minute Ride

- Bathroom Walls... Lipstick Secrets (2003)
- The World Needs Convincing Of All That It's Missing (2005)

With There & Back Again

- Demos 06 (2006)

With No Not Constant

- No Not Constant (Bootleg) (2012)

With O! The Joy

- Zen Mode (2008)

With Dance Gavin Dance

- Dance Gavin Dance (2008)
- Happiness (2009)

With A Lot Like Birds

- Conversation Piece (2011)
- No Place (2013)

With Eternity Forever

- Fantasy EP (2017)

With Push Over

- Demo EP (2017)

With Royal Coda

- Royal Coda (2018)
- Compassion (2019)
- To Only A Few At First (2022)

With Gold Necklace

- Gold Necklace (2021)

=== Guest appearances ===
Year	Song	Album	Artist
2010	"Testimony" (feat. Kurt Travis)	Lucky Me	Killing the Dream
2012	"No Spoons Full of Sugar" (feat. Kurt Travis)	Really Experiment	First Place Science Project
2013	"Our Last Night On Earth" (feat. Kurt Travis)	Living Creatures	Stolas
2013	"Medusa" (feat. Kurt Travis)	Living Creatures	Stolas
2013	"Visual Therapy" (feat. Kurt Travis)	French Ghetto	Strawberry Girls
2013	"Agua Verde " (feat. Kurt Travis)	French Ghetto	Strawberry Girls
2013	"All My Circuits" (feat. Kurt Travis)	The Rise of the Golden Eel EP	Who Invited the Wolf?
2013	"A Final Message" (feat. Kurt Travis)	We Are Alive EP	October Wolves
2015	"Overrated" (feat. Kurt Travis)	American Graffiti	Strawberry Girls
2016	"Circadian" (feat. Kurt Travis)	Cascading Home	In Angles
2016	"Get It Right" (feat. Kurt Travis)	Repeating History	Amarionette
2017	"Easy (The Commodores Cover)" (feat. Kurt Travis)	Single	Kyle Ekstrom
2017	"Multiverse" (feat. Kurt Travis)	Single	Andrés
2018	"Conjured Conjecture" (feat. Kurt Travis)	Single	Find Yourself
2018	"Shelf Life" (feat. Kurt Travis)	Artificial Selection	Dance Gavin Dance
2019	"Delectation" (feat. Kurt Travis & Garrett Rapp)	Reverie	Boy Becomes Hero
2019	"Exordium" (feat. Kurt Travis & Darina Kayukova)	Reverie	Boy Becomes Hero
2019	"Double Life" (feat. Kurt Travis)	Overlook Trail, Pt. 1	Natalie & the Damn Shandys
2019	"Rizzo" (feat. Kurt Travis)	Hope Less	Infinite Sleep
2019	"Compromise" (feat. Kurt Travis)	Single	Amarionette
2019	"Wiser Now" (feat. Kurt Travis)	Single	Amarionette
2020	"Shreddy vs Margaret" (feat. Kurt Travis)	Single	Ü Blue
2020	"Multiverse, Pt.2" (feat. Kurt Travis & Donovan Melero)	Single	Andrés
2020	"Amnesia" (feat. Kurt Travis)	Sunset on This Generation	Amarionette
2022	"Crave" (feat. Kurt Travis)	Fervor	Catbamboo
2022	"Kin" (feat. Kurt Travis)	Single	Leloyon
2024	"Scenes in a Film" (feat. Kurt Travis)	Guilt & Other Afflictions EP	predisposed.
