= The Architect (Eidola album) =

Studio album by Eidola
- Released: September 17, 2021
- Recorded: 2019–20
- Studios: Interlace Audio, Portland, Oregon
- Genres: Post-hardcore; progressive rock; experimental rock
- Length: 45:29
- Labels: Blue Swan; Rise
- Producers: Kris Crummett; Ian Cooperstein

Eidola chronology
To Speak, To Listen (Instrumental) (2017)	The Architect (2021)	Eviscerate (2024)

Singles from The Architect
- 1. "Counterfeit Shrines" Released: June 29, 2021; 2. "Perennial Philosophy" Released: August 13, 2021; 3. "Mutual Fear" Released: September 14, 2021

The Architect is the fourth full-length studio album by American rock band Eidola, released on September 17, 2021 through Blue Swan Records and Rise Records. The album serves as a follow-up to their third studio album, To Speak, To Listen (2017), and is their first to not feature rhythm guitarist Brandon Bascom, who departed from the band in December 2017 and was replaced by Royal Coda guitarist Sergio Medina. It is also the band's first release since their record label Blue Swan Records partnered with Rise in February 2021. The album was produced by Ian Cooperstein and Kris Crummett with recording sessions taking place at Interlace Audio in Portland, Oregon.

The lead single, "Counterfeit Shrines", was released on June 29, 2021. The second and third singles, "Hidden Worship" and "Perennial Philosophy", were each released on August 13. The fourth and final single, "Mutual Fear", featuring Jon Mess of American post-hardcore band Dance Gavin Dance, was released on September 14. To promote the album, the band toured as support on Dance Gavin Dance's Afterburner US tour in September and October 2021, performed at the second inaugural SwanFest in Sacramento, California in April 2022, and will tour as support on Dance Gavin Dance's UK tour in January 2023.

== Background ==
On June 2, 2017, Eidola released their third studio album, To Speak, To Listen, on Blue Swan Records, an independent record label owned by American musician and Dance Gavin Dance guitarist Will Swan. In support of the album, the band embarked on a North American tour with The Ongoing Concept and Save Us From The Archon, which took place from August 17 to September 19, 2017. On December 15, 2017, Eidola announced the headlining To Speak, To Listen Tour, with support from rock band Capstan and singer Andrés, which spanned from February 8 to March 3, 2018. On the same day, the group released an instrumental version of their third studio album, To Speak, To Listen. Prior to the group's To Speak, To Listen Tour, the band's original lead guitarist Brandon Bascom stepped down and was subsequently replaced by former Stolas and Royal Coda guitarist Sergio Medina.

After having supported American post-hardcore band Dance Gavin Dance's US co-headlining tour with CHON in 2017, Eidola performed at the band's inaugural SwanFest in Anaheim, California on March 30, 2019. In December 2019, it was confirmed that Eidola would be performing at the second annual SwanFest on April 25, 2020, in Sacramento. Due to the COVID-19 pandemic, SwanFest was postponed to April 2022 and the group withheld the announcement of their 2020 headlining tour.

== Recording ==
On November 11, 2019, the band confirmed that their fourth studio album was completed and would be "ready in early 2020" with a tour announcement to follow in support of its release. In April 2020, Andrew Wells confirmed the title of their fourth record would be The Architect, but expressed uncertainty on the release date amidst the COVID-19 pandemic and its effect on the music industry. The album was produced by Ian Cooperstein and Kris Crummett at Interlace Audio Recording Studios in Portland, Oregon. Recording sessions took place over the course of a year and concluded in early 2020, which was prolonged by Wells' involvement with Dance Gavin Dance. The album was postponed several times due to the COVID-19 pandemic and the legality of their record contract with Blue Swan Records becoming partnered with Rise Records and BMG Rights Management.

== Singles ==
On June 29, 2021, Eidola released the lead single "Counterfeit Shrines", accompanied with its music video and the album's announcement and pre-order bundles. On August 11, the group released the second and third singles, "Hidden Worship" and "Perennial Philosophy", to digital download and streaming services, alongside their respective music videos. On September 14, the fourth and final single, "Mutual Fear", featuring Jon Mess of Dance Gavin Dance, was released along with its music video.

== Tour ==
To promote the album, Eidola toured as support on American post-hardcore band Dance Gavin Dance's Afterburner Tour from September 7 to October 20, 2021. Originally, the band was scheduled to tour on progressive metal band Intervals' US run in November, yet backed out due to frontman Andrew Wells needing emergency throat surgery. The band also performed at the second inaugural SwanFest on April 23, 2022 in Sacramento, California.

The band will embark on Dance Gavin Dance's headlining UK tour in September 2022 along with Caskets and Volumes.

== Critical reception ==
The Architect has received mostly positive acclaim from music critics. The album was praised for the band's use of progressive rock and metal elements within their post-hardcore sound. Helana Michelle of Glasse Factory praised the album for its "melancholic nature [that] shares a real deep and personal set of experiences shared by Andrew himself."

== Track listing ==
The Architect track listing
No.	Title	Length
1.	"Hidden Worship"	2:52
2.	"Counterfeit Shrines"	4:34
3.	"Caustic Prayer"	3:38
4.	"Empty Gardens"	4:51
5.	"Occam's Razor"	1:51
6.	"Perennial Philosophy"	4:03
7.	"Forgotten Tongues"	3:53
8.	"Unequivocal Nature"	3:38
9.	"Alchemist Ascendant"	1:16
10.	"Elephant Bones"	4:25
11.	"Mutual Fear" (featuring Jon Mess)	3:52
12.	"Ancient Temperament"	6:30
Total length:		45:29

== Credits and personnel ==
Eidola

- Andrew Wells – lead vocals, guitar, bass guitar, piano, string arrangements, composer
- Sergio Medina – lead guitar
- Matthew Dommer – rhythm guitar, harsh vocals
- James Johnson – bass guitar
- Matthew Hansen – drums, percussion

Production

- Kris Crummett – producer, engineer
- Ian Cooperstein – producer
- Richard Orozoco – recording engineer
- Gigi Zimmer – recording engineer

Additional personnel

- Jon Mess – guest vocals (on "Mutual Fear")
- Chantelle Wells – guest vocals

== External link ==
- Eidola – The Architect at Discogs
