= Eidola (band) =

American post-hardcore band

- Origin: Spanish Fork, Utah, United States
- Genres: Post-hardcore; progressive rock; experimental rock; screamo; progressive metal
- Years active: 2011–present
- Labels: Blue Swan; Rise; 3DOT Recordings
- Members: Andrew Wells; Matthew Dommer; Matthew Hansen; Sergio Medina; Skylar Caporicci; Reese Ortenberg
- Past members: James Johnson; Brandon Bascom

Eidola is an American rock band from Spanish Fork, Utah, formed in 2011. The band consists of lead vocalist, composer and multi-instrumentalist Andrew Wells, guitarist Sergio Medina, bassist Reese Ortenberg, guitarist and harsh vocalist Matthew Dommer, guitarist Skylar Caporicci, and drummer Matthew Hansen. They self-released their debut studio album, The Great Glass Elephant, in 2012. The group signed to Blue Swan Records in 2014 and released their second and third albums, Degeneraterra (2015) and To Speak, to Listen (2017). In December 2017, lead guitarist Brandon Bascom left the band and was replaced by Royal Coda guitarist Sergio Medina.

== History ==
=== 2011–12: Formation and The Great Glass Elephant ===
Eidola first formed as a four-piece ambient post-hardcore band from Spanish Fork, Utah, in 2011, with lead vocalist and guitarist Andrew Michael Wells, harsh vocalist and guitarist Matthew Dommer, bass guitarist James Johnson, drummer Matthew Hansen, and on-stage lighting engineer Harold the Hallowed. The group became well known in the local hardcore punk scene in the Salt Lake City area, eventually garnering an online and local cult following. The band became known for their fusion of math rock, post-rock, metalcore, post-hardcore, and ambient music and their dynamic live concert performances.

The band recorded their debut full-length studio album with music engineer Randy Cordner, who produced, mixed, and mastered the record. The band self-released their debut studio album, The Great Glass Elephant, on December 1, 2012.

=== 2013–16: Degeneraterra ===
In late 2013, the band added guitarist Brandon Bascom to take on live guitar duties to allow Andrew to focus on vocals. Eidola toured briefly with American band I, Omega in the US from December 5 to December 12, 2014.

Eidola began writing and recording their second studio album with Dance Gavin Dance guitarist Will Swan and former Dance Gavin Dance guitarist Josh Benton, in 2014. The album was recorded and produced at Pus Cavern Recording Studios in Sacramento, California. On January 30, 2015, the band announced on social media that Harold the Hallowed was amicably departing from the band. Their second studio album, Degeneraterra, was released on May 5, 2015, and was the group's first release on Swan's independent record label Blue Swan Records.

In support of Degeneraterra, the band embarked on a headlining tour from October 18 to November 8, 2015, with support from rock bands Makari and Que Sera. On May 31, 2016, the band announced that they were touring as support on Hail the Sun's tour, with additional support from Belle Noire, from July 18 to July 25, 2016.

=== 2017–2019: To Speak, to Listen ===
Eidola toured as support on Dance Gavin Dance and CHON's co-headlining tour in North America, with Vasudeva, from February 24 to March 19, 2017. On March 28, 2017, it was announced that Eidola would tour in support of Hail the Sun's headlining U.S. tour with American rock bands Capsize and Limbs, taking place from May 21 to June 24, 2017.

On April 28, 2017, Eidola announced their third studio album, entitled To Speak, to Listen, with a scheduled release date of June 2, 2017, on Blue Swan Records. The band revealed that they had recorded with producer Dryw Owens. The album featured collaborations with American musician Joey Lancaster, former A Lot Like Birds bass guitarist Matthew Coate, and musician and saxophonist Nicholas Pope.

In support of To Speak, to Listen, the band headlined a North American tour with musical groups The Ongoing Concept and Save Us From The Archon, which took place from August 17 to September 19, 2017.

On December 15, 2017, Eidola announced their headlining To Speak, to Listen Tour, with support from rock band Capstan and singer Andrés, which took place from February 8 to March 3, 2018. On the same day, the group released an instrumental version of their third studio album, To Speak, to Listen.

=== 2019–2023: The Architect ===
On November 11, 2019, the band confirmed that their fourth studio album was completed and would be "ready in early 2020" with a tour announcement to follow in support of its release. In December 2019, it was confirmed that Eidola will be performing at the second annual SwanFest on April 25, 2020, in Sacramento, California. Due to the COVID-19 pandemic, SwanFest was postponed to April 2022 and the group withheld the announcement of their 2020 headlining tour. In April 2020, Andrew Wells confirmed the title of their upcoming fourth record would be The Architect but expressed uncertainty on the release date amidst the COVID-19 outbreak and its effect on the music industry.

On June 29, 2021, Eidola released the single "Counterfeit Shrines", their first new song in over four years, as the lead single from their fourth studio album The Architect, which was released on September 17, 2021. The band toured as support on Dance Gavin Dance's Afterburner Tour in September and October 2021.

=== 2024–2025: Eviscerate and Mend ===
On February 9, 2024, Eidola released a new single, "No Weapon Formed Shall Prosper", and announced their fifth studio album, Eviscerate, which released on April 12, 2024. Eviscerate is the first half of a "double album," and the second half, entitled Mend, would release the following year.

Eidola supported Periphery on their Wildfire Tour in May 2024. In June and July 2024, they embarked on their headlining Eviscerate tour with support from Royal Coda, Wolf & Bear, and Sani Bronco.

On November 11, 2024, Eidola announced that Mend would be releasing on January 17, 2025, followed a few days later by the announcement that touring members Skylar Caporicci and Reese Ortenberg had become permanent members of the band.

On November 15, 2024, Eidola released the first single of Mend, "The Faustian Spirit." A month later the second single, "Prodigy," was released on December 13, 2024.

=== 2026–present: 3DOT Recordings Era and The Will To Power ===
On February 12, 2026, Eidola released their first single since the release of the previous album "Mend", entitled "Purity Ladder". This marked the first release with 3DOT Recordings, which was accompanied along with a music video. This is also the first song to incorporate new members, Skylar Caporicci and Reese Ortenberg, into the songwriting process. Later, it would be revealed that "Purity Ladder" would be on the forthcoming album, The Will To Power.

On October 5, 2026, 3DOT Recordings announced via Instagram that Eidola's seventh record, The Will To Power, would be releasing on November 20th. A second single from the record, entitled "Damballah", released on October 8, 2026. A third single from the record, entitled "Niflheimr", was released on October 29, 2026.

== Musical style ==
Eidola has been labeled post-hardcore, experimental rock, progressive rock, post-rock, metalcore, math rock, and progressive metal.

== Band members ==
Current band members

- Andrew Michael Wells – lead vocals, guitar, keyboards (2011–present)
- Matthew Dommer – guitar (2011–2024), unclean vocals (2011–present)
- Matthew Hansen – drums, percussion (2011–present)
- Sergio Medina – guitar (2018–present), backing vocals (2018–2022)
- Reese Ortenberg – bass, backing vocals, keyboards (2024–present)
- Skylar Caporicci – guitar (2024–present)

Former band members

- Brandon Bascom – guitar, backing vocals (2013–2017)
- James Johnson – bass guitar (2011–2024)

Touring musicians

- Ian Joshua Cooperstein – guitar, keyboard, backing vocals, occasional unclean vocals (2023–2024)
- Jayden Mermella – drums, percussion (2024–present)

Timeline

== Discography ==
Studio albums

- The Great Glass Elephant (Self-Released, 2012)
- Degeneraterra (Blue Swan Records, 2015)
- To Speak, to Listen (Blue Swan Records, 2017)
- The Architect (Blue Swan Records/Rise Records, 2021)
- Eviscerate (Blue Swan Records/Rise Records, 2024)
- Mend (Blue Swan Records/Rise Records, 2025)
- The Will to Power (3Dot Recordings, 2026)

Other albums

- To Speak, to Listen (Instrumental) (2017)
- Eviscerate (Instrumental) (2024)
- The Architect (Instrumental) (2025)

Extended Plays

- Eidola (Self-Released, 2011)
