= Sianvar =

American band (2013–2019)

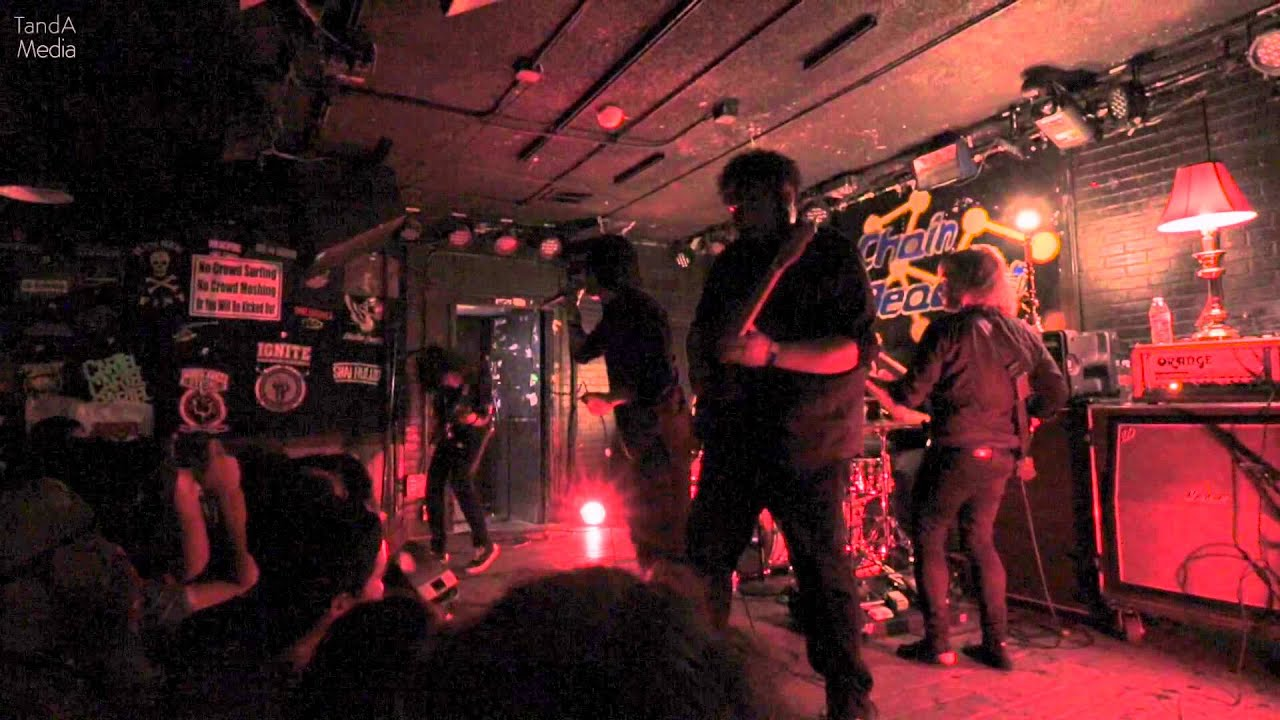
- Sianvar performing in 2015

Background information
- Origin: Sacramento, California, United States
- Genres: Progressive rock; math rock; post-hardcore; neo-prog; experimental rock
- Years active: 2013–2019
- Label: Blue Swan
- Spinoff of: Dance Gavin Dance; Stolas; Hail the Sun; A Lot Like Birds
- Past members: Will Swan; Donovan Melero; Sergio Medina; Joseph Arrington; Michael Littlefield; Michael Franzino
- Website: Official Facebook

Sianvar (pronounced: sea-en-var) was an American progressive rock band from Sacramento, California, formed in 2013. The group consisted of lead vocalist Donovan Melero, guitarists Will Swan and Sergio Medina, and drummer Joseph Arrington. The band was signed to Swan's independent record label Blue Swan Records. They released their debut self-titled EP on January 5, 2014, and their debut full-length studio album, Stay Lost, in August 2016. The band announced an indefinite hiatus on April 8, 2019.

== Career ==
=== 2013–17: Self-titled EP and Stay Lost ===
The band announced their formation on July 23, 2013. The group's first iteration consisted of Dance Gavin Dance guitarist Will Swan, Hail the Sun drummer and vocalist Donovan Melero, Stolas guitarist Sergio Medina, and A Lot Like Birds bassist Michael Littlefield and drummer Joseph Arrington. They signed with Swan's independent record label Blue Swan Records.

The group released their debut single "Sick Machine" on November 11, 2013. On January 5, 2014, they released their eponymously titled debut EP through Bandcamp. Sianvar performed their first concert on January 8, 2014, in San Francisco, California. In support of the release, the band toured with other musical groups such as A Lot Like Birds, Tilian Pearson, Strawberry Girls, Stolas, The Venetia Fair, My Iron Lung, EROS, Idlehands, Artifex Pereo, and Eidola.

Michael Littlefield departed from the band in February 2015, subsequently being replaced by A Lot Like Birds guitarist Michael Franzino. Sianvar began tracking for their debut full-length studio album in July 2015. On June 26, 2016, the band announced their debut studio album, Stay Lost, its track listing, and release date. Two days later, the group released the lead single "Omniphobia", accompanied with its music video, which premiered on Alternative Press. The band released the single "Psychosis Succumbing" on July 14. The band embarked on their headlining Stay Lost Tour beginning at the Red House in Walnut Creek, California on August 4, 2016.

Sianvar embarked on a second headlining tour in support of Stay Lost in January 2017 with Icarus the Owl and Frameworks.

=== 2018–present: Second studio album and hiatus ===
Sianvar toured as a supporting act on Dance Gavin Dance's headlining 2018 spring tour along with Erra and I See Stars, from May 26 to June 21, 2018.

On August 11, 2018, it was confirmed that recording sessions for the band's second full-length studio album had begun at Interlace Recording Studios in Portland, Oregon, with producer Kris Crummett.

On September 11, 2018, Michael Franzino announced his departure from the group, stating that he wanted to focus on his own music career. Will Swan announced that he would be recording bass guitar for the band's second studio album. On September 27, they revealed that they would be moving forward as a four-piece band.

The group embarked on a headlining tour, performing their debut studio album Stay Lost in its entirety, with support from Ghost Atlas and Wolf & Bear, from January 11 to January 19, 2019. Former A Lot Like Birds bass guitarist and vocalist Matthew Coate served as a touring member pursuing bass guitar on the trek.

On April 8, 2019, the band revealed that they were going on an indefinite hiatus from touring and releasing music. The announcement read, "All Sianvar music releases and activities have been postponed indefinitely." It continued, "This isn't a permanent goodbye, though it could be a while before we meet again". During the hiatus, Swan joined American post-hardcore band Royal Coda while Donovan Melero and Sergio Medina formed the post-hardcore duo Nova Charisma and signed to Equal Vision Records.

Two unreleased demo recordings from the group's recording sessions for their second studio album were repurposed for Dance Gavin Dance's ninth studio album Afterburner, one of which was its lead single "Prisoner".

== Musical style ==
Sianvar's musical style has been praised for its use of progressive rock, post-hardcore, and psychedelic elements. They have often been labelled post-hardcore, math rock, and experimental rock.

== Members ==
Final line-up

- Donovan Melero – lead vocals (2013–2019)
- Will Swan – guitar (2013–2019); bass (2018–2019)
- Sergio Medina – guitar, backing vocals (2013–2019)
- Joseph Arrington – drums, percussion (2013–2019)

Former members

- Michael Littlefield – bass (2013–2015)
- Michael Franzino – bass (2015–2018)

Touring members

- Matthew Coate – bass (2019)

Timeline

== Discography ==
Studio albums

- Stay Lost (Blue Swan, 2016)

Extended plays

- Sianvar EP (Blue Swan, 2014)

Singles

- "Sick Machine" (2013)
- "Omniphobia" (2016)
- "Psychosis Succumbing" (2016)
- "BedRoots" (2016)
