= Mišura =

Mišura or Misura is a surname. Notable people with the surname include:

- Antonija Mišura (born 1988), Croatian basketball player
- Emily Misura (born 1990), American violinist
- Ivana Mišura (born 1989), Croatian beauty pageant contestant
- Marko Mišura (born 1971), Croatian sailor
- Tomislav Mišura (born 1981), Slovenian footballer
