= Pushover =

Pushover or Push Over may refer to:

- Pushover strategy, a kind of strategic voting
- Pushover, an EP by Australian singer Lisa Miller
- Pushover (film), a 1954 film noir starring Fred MacMurray
- Push-Over (video game), a 1992 game from Ocean
- Pushover analysis, a type of seismic analysis
- "Push Over", a segment game from The Price Is Right
- "Pushover", a song by Etta James from the 1963 album Etta James Top Ten
- "Pushover", a song by The Long Winters from the 2006 album Putting the Days to Bed
- Pushover try, a try scored from a set-piece scrum in rugby union; see Scrum (rugby union)#Awarding
- Push Over (band), an American post-hardcore band
