= Time in Place =

Time in Place may refer to:

- Time in Place (Mike Stern album)
- Time in Place (Artifex Pereo album)
