= Emily Misura =

- Origin: Binghamton, New York, US
- Genres: Classical; rock; indie rock; comedy
- Occupation: Musician
- Instrument: Violin
- Years active: 2006–present
- Website: stringinghimalong.com

Emily Misura (born February 8, 1990), is an American violinist, poet, songwriter and comedian based in Toronto, Ontario. She released her solo musical comedy album “Trigger Warning” on April 20, 2022 after a successful Kickstater campaign.

== Early life and education ==
Emily Misura was born on February 8, 1990, in Johnson City, New York. Misura is of Ukrainian heritage and was raised in a musical family. Her mother was a clarinetist and her grandfather played concertina by ear in Slavic polka bands throughout Pennsylvania and upstate New York.

She attended Pine View School for the Gifted from 2000 - 2008. Her first published poem was in the 2006 River of Words anthology.

As a teenager, she performed with the North Port Orchestra, the Venice Symphony, and other various local orchestras. In 2008, she performed with the Sarasota Youth Philharmonic Orchestra at Carnegie Hall in New York City.

She attended Florida Atlantic University before transferring to Stetson University. She graduated from Stetson University in 2012 with Bachelors of Music in Violin Performance and Music Technology.

== Career ==
Misura has been in various local bands including the progressive metal band Fick, the indie band Andy Matchett and the Minks, and Lavola. She has made live guest appearances with Chris Carrabba (of Dashboard Confessional), MAE and Anberlin. She is currently in Bob Green and the Whiskey Conspiracy.

She has performed across North America for special events and in numerous concerts events for Microsoft, Mac Cosmetics, and Ferrari. She has performed soundtracks live with the Game of Thrones concert experience, Pokémon Symphonic Evolutions and The Legend of Zelda Symphony of the Goddess. She has also appeared on the national television show Yo Soy El Artista.

She won a contest to perform with Machine Gun Kelly after posting a Youtube cover of "A Little More" in 2015. She has performed with various musicians including The Who, The Eagles, Weird Al Yankovic, ELO, Frankie Valli, Michael Bolton, Amy Grant, and Richard Cheese.

=== Comedy ===
In November 2019, Misura took an Orlando comedy class. At the start of the COVID-19 pandemic, she started recording a musical comedy album and said she was inspired by "people telling me what I could and couldn’t say, or what I should or shouldn’t joke about." She went on to self-release "Trigger Warning" on April 20, 2022, where she was credited with writing, performing, recording and mixing the songs herself.

== Personal life ==
Misura was signed to a modeling agency while living in Orlando. She has been featured in a national television commercial for Skyla where she plays bass, as well as a commercial for Delta Dental where she plays cello. She is credited as "The Rocker" in the short film Ponder.

Before transitioning to a career in music full-time, she worked as a Systems Administrator.

After living in Florida since childhood, she moved to Toronto in 2021.

== Discography ==
- Futureshock – Fick (April 2, 2011)
- Loss of Halo – Fick (February 24, 2012)
- This Book is My Cowardice – Lavola (March 4, 2014)
- Old Tree – Goodnight Neverland (April 15, 2014)
- Mother Moon – Kerry Courtney (October 17, 2021)
- Trigger Warning – Emily Misura (April 20, 2022)

=== Guest appearances ===
- "Floating Vibes" and "Float" on Astrocoast – Surferblood (January 19, 2010)
- "How to Destroy Something Beautiful" on How to Destroy Something Beautiful – Team Cybergeist (January 19, 2010)
- "Recognize," "Better Than This," and "Bridge" - Invisible Ink – The Overunder (December 20, 2010)
- "Money" on In Vodville – Peter Baldwin (July 26, 2011)
- "No Love" and "The Morning After" on Professional Daydreamer – Michael Shelly (June 5, 2013)
- "Mountain House" and "Measure Your Breath" on Young and Courageous – Tides of Man (February 4, 2015)
- "Oh Well" on Everything is Beautiful – Kurt Travis (May 14, 2014)
- "Finding Home" on Better Moments – Boys of Fall (October 26, 2018)
- "You Fall When You Hesitate" on 360 Experience – MAE (November 18, 2019)
- "The Truth," "Lost," and "Gravestone" on You're Not Alone – Josh A (October 23, 2020)
- "Jashne Sabz" – Aria Moeini (March 12, 2022)

== Music videos ==
- "Count Me Out" by Ywada
- "African-Irish Guy" by Derek Ziegler
- "White Girl" by Ice x Chedda
- "Alotta Molly" by ClicKlak & Gwalla
