= Push Over (band) =

American post-hardcore musical duo

- Origin: Sacramento, California, U.S.
- Genres: Post-hardcore; mathcore
- Years active: 2017; 2019–20 (on hiatus)
- Label: Esque Records
- Members: Thomas Erak; Kurt Travis
- Website: Official Facebook

Push Over is an American post-hardcore musical duo composed of American musicians Thomas Erak, of Prog Rock band The Fall of Troy, and Kurt Travis, of rock band Royal Coda. Formed in 2017, the band released one demo extended play in February 2017 and were originally set to release their debut studio album in 2021, yet was postponed indefinitely. The duo are currently on hiatus and pursuing their respective endeavors.

== Background and formation ==
Push Over is considered a post-hardcore side-project] composed of Kurt Travis, formerly of Dance Gavin Dance and A Lot Like Birds and currently of Royal Coda, who pursues vocals and guitar, and Thomas Erak, currently of The Fall of Troy, who pursues drums, guitar, and backing vocals.

The band announced its formation on January 29, 2017, through a post on Instagram. The group's formation comes nine months after Erak's band The Fall of Troy released their fifth studio album, OK, in April 2016, which was considered the band's comeback record being their first release since 2009's In the Unlikely Event.

== Career ==
=== 2017–19: Demo EP, inactivity and other projects ===
A week following Push Over's announcement of their formation, the duo released their debut release, a demo EP, on February 6, 2017. The EP was released on Travis' independent record label, Esque Records. The release consists of three demo tracks; "Transitioning Seamlessly", "This Lonely Love", and "Run the Tapes".

Throughout the remainder of 2017 and 2018, the band remained inactive with no concert tours or other releases planned. Erak continued his career with The Fall of Troy and began writing and recording music for his solo music project, Thomas Erak and the Shoreline. After the release of Travis' other side-project Eternity Forever's debut EP, Fantasy, the musician departed from the band. Travis joined the American post-hardcore band Royal Coda and released its self-titled debut studio album, in April 2018. Erak joined Royal Coda's touring line-up briefly on Tilian's headlining U.S. tour in August 2018.

After speculation that Push Over was on an indefinite hiatus or permanently broken up, Kurt Travis confirmed in an interview on the podcast Lead Singer Syndrome with Shane Told, in February 2019, that the duo were writing for their upcoming debut full-length studio album, scheduled to be released in 2019. However, the release date has been postponed to 2020. On an Instagram livestream in July 2019, Erak stated that the project is "not dead but has been pushed over," after being asked about the band.

=== 2020–present: Debut studio album and hiatus ===
On December 5, 2019, it was announced that Push Over would tour as support on the American post-hardcore band Scary Kids Scaring Kids 15 year anniversary tour in January 2020, with SECRETS.

On January 10, they released the song "1NE", their first piece of new music since their demo EP was released in February 2017. "2WO" was released as the second track from their upcoming debut studio album on April 3. In a 2020 interview, Travis expressed that Push Over was once again on hiatus and both himself and Thomas Erak would be focusing on their respective endeavors.

== Musical style and sound ==
Push Over has been labeled post-hardcore and mathcore. In a review from Sputnik Music, the magazine described the duo's debut demo EP as "twiddly-diddly post-hardcore [...] in the vein of Dance Gavin Dance and The Fall of Troy."

== Band members ==
Current members

- Thomas Erak – drums, guitar, vocals (2017–present)
- Kurt Travis – vocals, guitar, programming (2017–present)

== Discography ==
Extended plays

- Demo (EP) (Esque Records, 2017)

Singles

- "1NE" (2020)
- "2WO" (2020)

== Tours ==
AS support

- The City Sleeps in Flames 15th Anniversary Tour
