= Royal Coda (album) =

Studio album by Royal Coda
- Released: April 27, 2018
- Recorded: January 2018
- Studio: VuDu Recording Studios in Port Jefferson, New York
- Genre: Post-hardcore; progressive rock; experimental rock
- Length: 32:17
- Label: Blue Swan Records
- Producer: Dominic Nastasi; Mike Watts

Royal Coda chronology
Royal Coda (2018)	Compassion (2019)

Singles from Royal Coda
- 1. "Anything to Save" Released: February 16, 2018; 2. "Cut Me Under" Released: March 29, 2018; 3. "Breathe Correct" Released: April 12, 2018

Royal Coda is the debut full-length studio album by American post-hardcore band Royal Coda, released on April 27, 2018, on Blue Swan Records. The album was produced by Dominic Nastasi and Mike Watts. It is the only release to feature the original trio of lead vocalist Kurt Travis, guitarist Sergio Medina, and drummer Joseph Arrington before guitarist Will Swan joined the three musicians the following year.

The album was supported by three singles; "Anything to Save", "Cut Me Under", and "Breathe Correct". The band toured to promote the record, including two headlining tours in 2018 and 2019, a performance at SwanFest, and supporting Tilian Pearson and Hail the Sun on their respective tours.

== Background and recording ==
Royal Coda was first founded by musician Sergio Medina in 2017 after wanting to form a rock musical project which would ideally include various different musicians, guitarists, and vocalists. The band officially announced its formation on January 28, 2018 also revealing that the group had signed a recording contract with independent label Blue Swan Records. Consisting of former Stolas guitarist Sergio Medina, former A Lot Like Birds drummer Joseph Arrington, and former A Lot Like Birds and Dance Gavin Dance vocalist Kurt Travis, the three-piece began recording material for their debut studio album.

The following day after announcing their inception, Royal Coda confirmed via Twitter that they had finished tracking their debut studio album. The band wrote and recorded the album at VuDu Recording Studios in Port Jefferson, New York with producers Dominic Nastasi and Mike Watts.

== Promotion ==
The lead single, "Anything to Save", was released for digital download and streaming services on February 16, 2018. Another single, "Cut Me Under", was released on March 29, along with the official announcement of their debut studio album, with a scheduled release date of April 27, 2018. A third single, "Breathe Correct", was released on April 12, 2018, which premiered on Substream Magazine.

Royal Coda was made available to stream a day before its release date, on April 26, 2018, on New Noise Magazine.

In support of the debut release, Royal Coda performed their first two concerts at Family Vacation Music Festival in Sacramento, California on May 19 and at Chain Reaction in Anaheim, California on May 20, 2018. The band also toured as support on American musician Tilian's headlining solo U.S. tour from August 23 to September 23, 2018, alongside Sunsleep and Andrés. On the tour, the band recruited The Fall of Troy vocalist and guitarist Thomas Erak and former Dance Gavin Dance bass guitarist Jason Ellis; it was later revealed that the group confirmed Erak and Ellis as permanent members.

== Track listing ==
All track titles and durations taken from Bandcamp.

No.	Title	Length
1.	"Blood Thinner"	2:56
2.	"Anything To Save"	3:28
3.	"Cut Me Under"	3:40
4.	"Breathe Correct"	3:10
5.	"De Rein"	2:05
6.	"See Them Faceless"	3:20
7.	"Love Again"	3:28
8.	"Calm and Composed"	3:41
9.	"Cycled Through the Past"	4:12
10.	"Suffolk"	3:36
Total length:		32:17

== Credits and personnel ==
Royal Coda

- Kurt Travis – lead vocals
- Sergio E. Medina – guitar, bass guitar, programming
- Joseph Arrington – drums, percussion

Production

- Mike Watts – producer, audio engineer
- Dominic Nastasi – producer, audio engineer, mastering engineer
- Sergio E. Medina – composer, artistic direction
- Spencer Haley – art layout
- Sergio A. Medina – photography
