= Everything Is Beautiful (disambiguation) =

"Everything Is Beautiful" is a 1970 song by Ray Stevens.

Everything Is Beautiful may also refer to:

- Everything Is Beautiful (Ray Stevens album), 1970
- Everything Is Beautiful (Kurt Travis album), 2014
- Everything Is Beautiful (Princess Nokia album), 2020
- "Everything Is Beautiful", song by Kylie Minogue from Aphrodite

== See also ==
- Everything Was Beautiful, a 2022 album by Spiritualized
