= Andy Cizek =

American singer

- Born: Andrew Scott Cizek; November 8, 1992 (age 33)
- Origin: Baltimore, Maryland, U.S.
- Genres: Metalcore; indie rock; progressive metal; screamo
- Occupations: Singer; songwriter; YouTuber; vocal coach
- Years active: 2011–present
- Labels: InVogue Records; Century Media Records; We Are Triumphant
- Member of: Monuments; Makari; Termina; WVNDER; Dearest; A Lot Like Birds
- Formerly of: A Ghost in the Machine; Goner

YouTube information
- Channel: Andy Cizek
- Genre: Music
- Subscribers: 158 thousand
- Views: 19.56 million
- Last updated: December 15, 2025

Andrew Scott Cizek (born November 8, 1992), known professionally as Andy Cizek, is an American singer, songwriter, vocal coach and YouTuber from Baltimore, Maryland.

He is currently the lead singer of Monuments, Makari, Termina, WVNDER, and Dearest, co-lead singer of A Lot Like Birds, while also releasing music as a solo artist. Cizek became first known for his metalcore covers on YouTube utilizing his versatile vocal, with his Sumerian Records vocal audition video helping him become notable in the modern metal circles in 2016.

== Career ==
=== WVNDER ===
An alternative rock/pop punk band WVNDER (initially named Wander) was formed in 2013 in Frederick, MD, by Cizek and guitarist Jack Rentschler, who played in a band together since high school. The two were later joined by Danny Salsbury (guitar, vocals), and Brett Schleicher (drums).

=== Makari ===
As WVNDER's lead vocalist, Cizek opened for and formed a bond with the members of American rock band Makari, starting in early 2016. In November 2017, with the release of the single "Control", Cizek was unveiled as the new vocalist for Makari.

=== Termina ===
In 2019, Cizek and a fellow YouTuber, guitarist Nik Nocturnal, started a modern metal project named Termina. By 2025, Termina has independently released two full-length albums, and numerous singles, having released songs with such guest musicians as Marcus Bridge of Northlane, Phil Bozeman of Whitechapel, and Jason Richardson among others.

=== Monuments ===
On 1 July 2019, British progressive metal band Monuments announced the departure of their vocalist, Chris Barretto. They announced Cizek as their fill-in singer for the rest of their 2019 tour. On 11 October 2019, Monuments announced Cizek was their official vocalist.

=== Dearest ===
Recorded in 2018, an EP "Corrode" was released in 2022 by a progressive metal project Dearest. It features Cizek on vocals, guitarist Lukas Guyader (ex-Intervals) and drummer Anup Sastry (ex-Intervals, ex-Skyharbor).

=== A Lot Like Birds ===
On August 10, 2024, Cizek was announced as a touring co-vocalist for post-hardcore band A Lot Like Birds on their fall 2024 tour.

On October 1, 2025, A Lot Like Birds released "When in Love", a single featuring Geoff Rickly of Thursday, marking their first official release in 7 years. The description for the song's music video confirmed Cizek as an official member of the band's lineup.

== Discography ==
=== Original music ===
As a solo artist

- "Select Your Inhibitor" (Single, 2017, Independent)
- "Existential" (Single, 2019, Independent)
- "The Current" (Single, 2019, Independent)
- "Live Somehow" (Single, 2024, Independent)
- "Pain Reliever" (Single, 2024, Independent)

With Monuments

- "Animus" (Single, 2020, Century Media Records)
- "Deadnest" (Single, 2021, Century Media Records)
- In Stasis (LP, 2022, Century Media Records)
- "Nefarious" (Single, 2023, Century Media Records)
- In Stasis (Deluxe Edition) (LP, 2023, Century Media Records)

With Termina

- Dysphoria (LP, 2021, Independent)
- Soul Elegy (LP, 2023, Independent)
- "Lie To Me" (Single, 2024, Independent)

With Makari

- Hyperreal (LP, 2018, InVogue Records)
- "Better - Live Acoustic" (Single, 2019, InVogue Records)
- Alternate (EP, 2020, InVogue Records)
- Continuum (EP, 2020, Independent)
- "Phantom" (Single, 2022, Independent)
- Wave Machine (LP, 2024, Independent)

With WVNDER

- Wander (LP, 2014, We Are Triumphant)
- Rest (EP, 2015, We Are Triumphant)
- Precipice (LP, 2016, We Are Triumphant)
- "Angry or Sad (Angry Version)" (Single, 2018, We Are Triumphant)
- Nothing Stays (LP, 2019, We Are Triumphant)
- Wake (EP, 2021, Independent)
- "Hollow Days" (Single, 2022, Independent)

With Dearest

- Retrograde (EP, 2022, Independent)

With A Ghost in the Machine

- Other Worlds (EP, 2011, Independent)
- Amity (EP, 2013, Independent)

As a featured artist

- Derek Ryan - "A Pair of Dice" (feat. Andy Cizek) (from One Hundred Twenty One Liars LP, 2013, Independent)
- Nik Nocturnal - "Dear Phantom" (feat. Andy Cizek) (from Undying Shadow LP, 2017, Independent)
- Ev0lution - "Take Me Away" (feat. Andy Cizek, Eternal Prophecy, Josh Miller) (from Uprise LP, 2017, Independent)
- Alterant - "Bleeding Out", "Sunset" and "Fragile" (feat. Andy Cizek) (Singles, also featured on Honor System LP, 2019, Independent)
- Anup Sastry - "Where I Belong", "Beneath the Mask", "Story of Us" (feat. Andy Cizek) (featured on Illuminate LP, 2019, Independent)
- I Met A Yeti - "Cherry Blossom" (feat. Andy Cizek) (featured on Camp Yeti EP, 2019, Independent)
- Kyle Ritter - "Atonement" (feat. Andy Cizek) (Single, 2019, Independent)
- The Fortress - "The Brother: The Captive" (feat. Andy Cizek) (Single, 2019, Independent)
- Dreamhouse - "Closer to Comfort" (feat. Andy Cizek of Makari) (Single, also featured on Reverberating the Silence LP, 2019, InVogue Records)
- Lore - "Let Me Go" (feat. Andy Cizek) (Single, 2019, Independent)
- Joshua Travis - "Gouge" (feat. Andy Cizek) (Single, 2020, Independent)
- Joshua Travis - "The Hollow" (feat. Andy Cizek) (Single, 2020, Independent)
- Lost Trees - "Sonder Eyes" (feat. Andy Cizek) (Single, also featured on Waking Life EP, 2020, Independent)
- I Built the Sky - "The Fire Inside" (feat. Andy Cizek and Olly Steele) (Single, 2020, Independent)
- Breakthrough Even - "Phoenix Down" (feat. Andy Cizek) (Single, 2021, Independent)
- Andrés - "A Nice Soft Painless Lie" (feat. Andy Cizek) (from Adventures of a DIY Astronaut LP, 2021, Independent)
- Adventurer - "Afterlife" (feat. Andy Cizek, Cristina Pena) (from Pacifica LP, 2021, Esque Records)
- The Seafloor Cinema - "Rayla" (feat. Andy Cizek and Matt Aplleton) (from In Cinemascope with Stereophonic Sound LP, 2021, Epitaph Records)
- Joshua Travis - "Web of Lies" (feat. Andy Cizek and Stephen Taranto) (Single, also featured on NO REST EP, 2022, SharpTone Records)
- Mike Malyan - "Crockpot" (feat. Andy Cizek) (Single, 2022, Independent)
- X-RL7 - Overdose of Emotions (feat. Andy Cizek & genCAB) (Single, 2022, Independent)
- Absently - "The Hero's Flame" (feat. Andy Cizek) (Single, 2023, Independent)
- Humble Abode - "Common Zombies (Acoustic)" (feat. Andy Cizek) (from Manic Mansion LP, 2023, Independent)
- Made In Taiwan - "Motives Unknown" (feat. Andy Cizek) (Single, 2023, Independent)
- VRSTY - "Kill The Rich" (feat. Andy Cizek) (Single, also featured on Levitate LP, 2023, Spinefarm Records)
- The Difference Between - "Everyone Carried a Shadow" (feat. Andy Cizek) (from Sonic Dark EP, 2023, Independent)
- Cevret - "Blinded" (Single, also featured on Sensus EP, 2024, Independent)
- Dal Av - "Remember Me" (feat. Andy Cizek) (Single, 2023, Independent)
- The Gentle Men - "Enemy" (feat. Andy Cizek) (featured on The Gentle Men EP, 2023, Independent)
- Space Weather - "Geminate Stare" (feat. Andy Cizek) (featured on Jaded And Dreaming LP, 2023, Independent)
- Olly Steele - "Tyed" (feat. Andy Cizek, Casey Sabol, Pierre Danel) (Single, 2023, Independent)
- Fire Keeper - "Radiance" (feat. Andy Cizek) (from Firekeeper LP, 2024, Independent)
- Sick Enough - "Anxious" (feat. Andy Cizek) (from What Makes Me EP, 2024, Independent)
- Hostile Array - "Slow Decay" (feat. Andy Cizek) (Single, 2024, Independent)
- Dal Av - "Shadow's Crown" (feat. Andy Cizek) (Single, 2024, Independent)
- Evaca - "Jheva" (Single, also featured on The Awakening EP, 2024, Independent)
- Killstreak - "Terrible Fate" (feat. Andy Cizek) (from The Cursed Crown LP, 2025, Independent)

=== Cover songs ===
As a solo artist

- "Shameless" (The Weeknd cover; Single, 2016, Independent)
- "Do You Feel It?" (Chaos Chaos cover; Single, 2017, Independent)
- "Echo Chamber" (Veil of Maya cover; Single, 2017, Independent)
- "Given Up" (Linkin Park cover; Single, 2017, Independent)
- "Ignorance" (Paramore cover; Single, 2018, Independent)
- "On My Teeth" (Underoath cover; Single, 2018, Independent)
- "True Colors" (Slaves cover; Single, 2018, Independent)
- "Mantra" (Bring Me the Horizon cover; Single, 2018, Independent)
- "Diamond Eyes" (Deftones cover; Single, 2018, Independent)
- "Stygian Blue" (Monuments cover; Single, 2018, Independent)
- "Crawling" (Linkin Park cover; Single, 2019, Independent)
- "Shadow on the Sun" (Audioslave cover; Single, 2019, Independent)
- "Death of a Bachelor" (Panic! at the Disco cover; Single, 2019, Independent)
- "Carl Barker" (Dance Gavin Dance cover; Single, 2019, Independent)
- "Get Out" (Circa Survive cover; Single, 2019, Independent)
- "Helena" (My Chemical Romance cover; Single, 2019, Independent)
- "Senseless Massacre" (Rings of Saturn cover; Single, 2020, Independent)
- "Prisoner" (Dance Gavin Dance cover; Single, 2020, Independent)
- "Rule of Nines" (Spiritbox cover; Single, 2020, Independent)
- "From the Sky" (Protest the Hero cover; Single, 2020, Independent)
- "Christmas Makes Me Cry" (Kacey Musgraves cover; Single, 2020, Independent)

Collaborations

- Andy Cizek, John Tomasso, Mike Smith, Sal Piazza - Midnight Crusade (Dance Gavin Dance cover; Single, 2018, Independent)
- Nik Nocturnal, Andy Cizek - "Blame It on Me" (Post Malone cover; Single, 2018, Independent)
- Nik Nocturnal, Andy Cizek - "To Plant a Seed" (We Came as Romans cover; Single, 2018, Independent)
- Nik Nocturnal, Andy Cizek - "Medicine" (Bring Me the Horizon cover; Single, 2019, Independent)
- Nik Nocturnal, Andy Cizek - "The Violence" (Asking Alexandria cover; Single, 2019, Independent)
- Nik Nocturnal, Andy Cizek - "Take Over" (League of Legends theme song cover; Single, 2020, Independent)
- Andy Cizek, Mike Malyan - "Never Gonna Give You Up" (Rick Astley cover; Single, 2021, Independent)
- Enmity, Hardstyle Demon, Andy Cizek - ROCKSTAR (Post Malone cover; Single, 2023, Independent)

With A Ghost in the Machine

- Lying From You (Linkin Park Cover) (Single, 2011, Independent)
