= Makari (band) =

American musical group

- Origin: Orlando, Florida, U.S.
- Genres: Alternative rock; pop-punk; post-hardcore; progressive rock; ambient rock
- Years active: 2011–present
- Labels: InVogue; Thriller
- Members: Eric Stewart; Matt Beljan; John Tomasso; Kevin Beljan; Andy Cizek

Makari (derived from the Gaelic word 'makar') is an American rock band from Orlando, Florida, formed in 2011. The band currently consists of vocalist Andy Cizek, guitarists Matt Beljan and Eric Stewart, bass guitarist John Tomasso, and drummer Kevin Beljan.

== History ==
Makari was formed in 2011 by guitarists Matt Beljan and Eric Stewart, bass guitarist John Tomasso, drummer Kevin Beljan, vocalist Brandon Cullen and keyboardist Lindsey England.

With this lineup, Makari independently released EPs The Escape (2011), See Dreams (2013) and Ghost Stories (2015), as well as maxi-single Knives, Knives, Knives (2013). The latter featured guest vocals from Tilian Pearson (ex-Dance Gavin Dance and Tides of Man) on a track "Life, Barefoot". During this period Makari shared the stage and toured with such acts as Hail the Sun, Capture the Crown, Jonny Craig, Palisades and Eidola among others.

In 2016, England and Cullen left the band, Spencer Pearson (ex-Decoder, ex-VersaEmerge, ex-Lead Hands) became the new vocalist, the band signed with InVogue Records and released Elegies EP. To promote Elegies, Makari played co-headline tours with Concepts and WVNDER in 2017.

In 2017, Andy Cizek replaced Pearson on vocals. In 2018, Makari toured extensively, playing co-headline tours with Adventurer and Wolf & Bear, and supporting Kurt Travis on his summer and fall tours. On August 3, 2018, Makari played at Vans Warped Tour '18. On August 3, 2018, Makari released their debut full-length album Hyperreal produced by Andrew Wade, to positive reviews. Promoting the album, Makari played co-headline spring tours with Softspoken and Calling All Captains, supported Kurt Travis in his "There's a Place I Want to Take You" tour, and played fall shows with Slaves and Picturesque in 2019.

In 2020, Makari released an acoustic Alternate EP featuring the songs from Hyperreal and Elegies via InVogue Records. After this release Makari decided to break ties with InVogue records and went independent. Later in 2020, Makari released Continuum EP.

On May 13, 2022, Makari released an acoustic single titled Phantom.

On October 24, 2023, Makari released single Soulstealer while teasing their upcoming album Wave Machine. During the release cycle singles Breakers and Eternity Leave were released December 1, 2023 and January 19, 2024 respectively. Wave Machine was released independently on March 8, 2024, to positive reviews. The band played a headlining US "Wave Machine Tour" in 2024, supported by such acts as Origami Button and scro.

On October 24, 2025, Makari released a single titled Disappearing Act.

== Band members ==
=== Current members ===
- Andy Cizek – vocals (2017–present)
- Matt Beljan – guitars (2011–present)
- Eric Stewart – guitars (2011–present)
- John Tomasso – bass (2011–present)
- Kevin Beljan – drums (2011–present)

=== Past members ===
- Brandon Cullen – vocals (2011–2016)
- Lindsay England – keyboards (2011–2016)
- Spencer Pearson – vocals (2016–2017)

== Discography ==
=== Albums ===
- Hyperreal (2018)
- Wave Machine (2024)

=== EP ===
- The Escape (2011)
- Knives, Knives, Knives (2013)
- See Dreams (2013)
- Ghost Stories (2015)
- Elegies (2016)
- Alternate (2020)
- Continuum (2020)
- Alternate EP 2 (2025)

=== Singles ===
- Paper Ghosts (2014)
- Melt (2016)
- Blossom (2016)
- Control (2017)
- Better (2019)
- Transient (acoustic) (2020)
- Melt (acoustic) (2020)
- Control (Kinnecom remix) (2020)
- Labyrinth (2020)
- Let Go (2020)
- Reflection (2020)
- Phantom (2022)
- Soulstealer (2023)
- Breakers (2023)
- Eternity Leave (2024)
- Speed Freak (2026)

== Videography ==
- The Keeper
- Olas
- Paper Ghosts
- Subtitles
- Melt
- Starboy (The Weeknd cover)
- Control
- Transient
- Hyperreal
- Better
- Labyrinth
- Phantom
- Soulstealer
- Breakers
- Closer
- And Now We Sleep In Endless Ocean
