= Time in Place (Artifex Pereo album) =

Studio album by Artifex Pereo
- Released: May 27, 2014
- Genre: Alternative rock, experimental rock, post-hardcore
- Length: 49:42
- Label: Tooth & Nail
- Producer: Kris Crummett

Artifex Pereo chronology
Ailments & Antidotes (2011)	Time in Place (2014)	Passengers (2016)

Time in Place is the debut studio album from the American rock band Artifex Pereo. The album was released on May 27, 2014 by Tooth & Nail Records. This album was produced by Kris Crummett. The album charted on two Billboard charts, and met with a positive critical reception.

== Background ==
This album is the follow-up to the second independent album Ailments & Antidotes that released on July 23, 2011. Time in Place is their debut studio album that was produced by Kris Crummett, and it was released by Tooth & Nail Records on May 27, 2014.

== Critical reception ==
Professional ratings
Review scores
Source	Rating
Alternative Press	3.5/5 stars
Indie Vision Music	4/5 stars
Jesus Freak Hideout	4/5 stars 3.5/5 stars 4.5/5 stars
New Release Tuesday	4/5 stars
Substream Magazine	5/5 stars

Time in Place garnered praise from the ratings and reviews of music critics. At Alternative Press, Dan LeRoy rated the album three-and-a-half stars out of five, indicating how this release "epitomize[s] that sometimes elusive Golden Mean between ambition and emotion." Broad B. of Indie Vision Music rated the album four stars out of five, commenting how the release is "worthy of your attention, your time, and your money." At New Release Tuesday, Jonathan Francesco rated the album four stars out of five, remarking how the band "can go from soft to headbanging-inducing in an instant, and they are perfectly capable of carrying an infectious tune"; however, Francesco cautions that "The worthy pieces don't always fall into a thrilling alignment, however, resulting in many of the songs not sinking in as deeply as they otherwise could." In addition, Francesco says "Artifex Pereo has lyrical complexity to make many bands weep." Sebastian Mackay of Substream Magazine rated the album a perfect five stars, calling the release "invigorating."

At Jesus Freak Hideout, they did three reviews of the album, and those are from Scott Fryberger, Kevin Hoskins and Michael Weaver, which their ratings were out of five stars are as follows; four stars, three-and-a-half stars and four-and-a-half stars. Fryberger stating that "Time In Place is a collection of good rock songs that are individually great, but aren't necessarily the components of a great rock record", and that's why "as a whole is more equal to the sum of its parts." Hoskins writing that "the problem that often occurs with an experimental sound is that sometimes the creativity just simply doesn't work out so well, and that can happen a few times on this listen." Additionally, Weaver states that "As with almost any album, there is a little "filler" here but I would certainly recommend fans of the emo rock scene to check these guys out." Weaver saying "Count this one as a big win" for the band and label for signing them.

== Commercial performance ==
For the Billboard charting week of June 14, 2014, Time in Place was the No. 26 most sold of the Christian Albums, and it was the No. 17 most sold in the breaking-and-entry chart of the Heatseekers Albums.

== Track listing ==
All tracks are written by Artifex Pereo

Track list
No.	Title	Length
1.	"No Stranger to Worry"	4:50
2.	"To Listen & Say Nothing"	3:53
3.	"Hands of Penance"	3:00
4.	"Annica"	3:55
5.	"Laugh & the World Laughs with You"	3:37
6.	"Liable for Tragedy"	4:09
7.	"The Straight & the Winding Way"	3:49
8.	"Apeiron"	4:23
9.	"The Golden Age"	4:23
10.	"Cut Sign"	3:49
11.	"Weep & You Weep Alone"	0:50
12.	"Tied to the Sunset"	5:28
13.	"Overview"	3:36
Total length:		49:42

== Charts ==
Chart (2014)	Peak position
US Christian Albums (Billboard)	26
US Heatseekers Albums (Billboard)	17
