= No Place (album) =

Studio album by A Lot Like Birds
- Released: October 29, 2013
- Recorded: 2012–13
- Genre: Post-hardcore; experimental rock; math rock
- Length: 46:00
- Label: Equal Vision
- Producer: Kris Crummett

A Lot Like Birds chronology
Conversation Piece (2011)	No Place (2013)	DIVISI (2017)

Professional ratings
Review scores
Source	Rating
AllMusic	4/5 stars
Rock Sound	6/10
Sputnikmusic	4.4/5.0

No Place is the third album by American post-hardcore band A Lot Like Birds, released October 29, 2013 through Equal Vision Records. It is also the last album to feature both Michael Littlefield and Kurt Travis before they left the band in 2016.

== Background ==
The album tells a story of a narrator walking through an old house in which they used to live. Each song is about a different room. For example: No Nature is the basement, Next to Ungodliness is the bathroom, Hand Over Mouth, Over & Over is the bedroom, Recluse is the attic, etc.

== Track listing ==
No.	Title	Length
1.	"In Trances"	1:27
2.	"No Nature"	5:02
3.	"No Nurture"	6:03
4.	"Next to Ungodliness"	3:20
5.	"Connector"	6:10
6.	"Myth of Lasting Sympathy"	1:43
7.	"Hand Over Mouth, Over & Over"	4:21
8.	"Kuroi Ledge"	5:57
9.	"Recluse"	4:43
10.	"Shaking of the Frame"	6:40
