= Everything Is Beautiful (Kurt Travis album) =

Studio album by Kurt Travis
- Released: May 14, 2014
- Recorded: 2013–14
- Genre: Indie pop
- Length: 40:19
- Label: Blue Swan Records
- Producer: Josh Benton

Kurt Travis chronology
Kurt Travis EP (2013)	Everything Is Beautiful (2014)	Kurt Travis/Paul Travis Split EP (2016)

Singles from Everything Is Beautiful
- 1. "Brain Lord" Released: April 22, 2014

Everything Is Beautiful is the debut full-length studio album by American recording artist Kurt Travis, released on May 14, 2014, on Blue Swan Records. "Brain Lord" was released as the lead single on April 22, 2014. The album is his first release on Blue Swan since departing with his previous record label Equal Vision Records.

== Background ==
Everything Is Beautiful was written throughout a 2 to 3 year time period between Kurt Travis and Strawberry Girls guitarist Zachary Garren. Inspiration for the album derived from At the Drive-In and Geoff Rickly of Thursday. The percussionist for Travis' band A Lot Like Birds, Joe Arrington, recorded drums and percussion for the album. Former Dance Gavin Dance guitarist Josh Benton served as producer. In support of the album, Travis toured in North America from May 14 to June 7, 2014 with supporting acts Hotel Books and So Much Light, presented by Blue Swan Records.

== Sound and influence ==
Kurt Travis described the album as mixture of alternative rock, indie pop, new wave, electronica, folk, and R&B. The album was described as ambient and "DGD-influenced" by Sputnikmusic.

== Reception ==
In a review from Sputnikmusic editor Daniel David, the album received a rating of 4.0 out of 5, with an "excellent" rating and was listed at No. 127 for the year 2014. In the review, David talks about the album's sound comparing it to Smashing Pumpkins and Foo Fighters:

The serenely ambient opener and title track "Everything Is Beautiful" is more than enough evidence for this. It honestly wouldn't feel out of place on a Mogwai release, and while it's a relatively large departure from the nature of the rest of the album, it's a perfect way to start off the proceedings. It's impressive how little Travis has to draw from his musical history to hit things out of the park: "It's All Over" mixes "sexy" vocals with a hypnotically melancholic guitar riff with a result that's far greater than the sum of its parts; "Too Loud / Too Cold" has an fantastically nostalgic alternative rock vibe, almost sounding like it could have come from the Foo Fighters or Smashing Pumpkins; and "Desperate" has a relentlessly funky chorus tempered by comparatively relaxed verses. It's really only on "Casting Dreams" where Kurt brings some of his main band's sound into the mix... but the song quickly distinguishes itself when the fist-pumpingly catchy chorus hits. And the lead single "Brain Lord" sounds like the style of predictable, vaguely DGD-influenced pop that most people would have expected from a Kurt solo outing, but still manages to be one of the more infectious tracks on the record.

Deadpress presented the album with a rating of 6 out of 10 stars calling Travis' vocal range "the least striking of all of Dance Gavin Dance's vocalists past and present" and called it a "catchy and entertaining LP."

== Track listing ==
No.	Title	Length
1.	"Everything Is Beautiful"	3:33
2.	"Overthinking"	3:10
3.	"Too Loud / Too Cold"	4:31
4.	"Casting Dreams"	2:40
5.	"Tear It Out"	4:10
6.	"Sword Art"	4:05
7.	"It's All Over"	3:37
8.	"Oh Well"	3:29
9.	"Desperate"	4:28
10.	"Everything Is Horrible"	2:44
11.	"Brain Lord"	2:37
12.	"Made It Out"	3:15
Total length:		40:19

== Personnel ==
- Kurt Travis - songwriting, vocals, guitar
- Zachary Garren (of Strawberry Girls) - songwriting, guitars
- Joe Arrington (of A Lot Like Birds) - drums, percussion
- Josh Benton - production
- Kris Crummett - mixing
