= Artifex Pereo =

American rock band

- Origin: Louisville, Kentucky, U.S.
- Genres: Alternative rock, experimental rock, hard rock, post-hardcore, progressive rock
- Years active: 2008–present
- Labels: Tooth & Nail
- Members: Lucas Worley; Eugene Barker; Jeremiah Brinkworth; Jamie Davis; Jordan Haynes
- Past members: Evan Redmon; Cory Eaves
- Website: facebook.com/artifexpereo/

Artifex Pereo is an American rock band from Louisville, Kentucky that formed in 2008. The band released two independent releases before being signed to Tooth & Nail Records. In 2014, the band released their debut studio album entitled Time in Place that charted on two Billboard charts.

== Background ==
Artifex Pereo are from Louisville, Kentucky, and they formed as a band in 2008. The band name originates from the phrase "Qualis artifex pereo", Roman emperor Nero's famous last words. In Latin this translates to "what an artist dies with me", "artifex" meaning artist and "pereo" meaning perishes.

== Music ==
In April 2014, the band signed with Tooth & Nail Records, and later the next month released their debut studio album.

Independent work

The band released their first musical project on July 18, 2009, entitled Am I Invisible EP. The extended play was produced by guitarist Jordan Haynes in his basement.

Their first album came out on July 23, 2011, which was entitled Ailments & Antidotes. The album was produced by Kris Crummett, but were unable to tour the music because they lost founding member and lead vocalist Evan Redmon, who resigned in March 2011.

Interim work

The band secured another lead singer, Portland, Oregon native Lucas Worley. Worley moved to Louisville to be with the band allowing them to tour sporadically. The band started work on their second album with Crummett in the production chair during the winter months of 2013. This album work eventually got picked up by Tooth & Nail Records, which they signed to and led to the creation of their debut studio album.

Studio albums

On May 27, 2014, Artifex Pereo released their debut studio album entitled Time in Place with Tooth & Nail Records. It charted on two Billboard charts, and those were the Christian Albums at No. 26 and No. 17 on the Heatseekers Albums. When the band were signed to Tooth & Nail Records in early April 2014, they released their first single "Hands of Penance". About a month later, the second single from the album was released "Apeiron". However, both of these lead single failed to chart on any sales or airplay Billboard charts.

== Members ==
- Eugene Barker (2008–present) – bass guitar
- Jeremiah Brinkworth (2008–present) – keys
- Jamie Davis (2008–present) – guitar, vocals
- Jordan Haynes (2008–present) – guitar
- Cory Eaves (2008–present) – drums
- Evan Redmon (2008–2011) – vocals
- Lucas Worley (2013–present) – lead vocals

== Discography ==
=== Studio albums ===
List of studio albums, with selected chart positions
Title	Album details	Peak chart positions	
Title	Album details	US CHR	US HEAT
Time in Place	Released: May 27, 2014; Label: Tooth & Nail; CD, digital download	26	17
Passengers	Released: September 9, 2016; Label: Tooth & Nail; CD, Vinyl, Digital Download	10	—
