= Royal Coda =

American rock band

- Origin: Sacramento, California, U.S.
- Genres: Post-hardcore; math rock; experimental rock; progressive rock
- Years active: 2017–present
- Labels: Blue Swan; Rise
- Members: Sergio Medina; Kurt Travis; Will Swan; Steffen Gotsch; Joel Turcotte
- Past members: Thomas Erak; Jason Ellis; Joseph Arrington
- Website: Official Facebook

Royal Coda is an American rock band based in Sacramento, California, founded by lead guitarist Sergio Medina. They are known for their amalgamation of progressive rock, psychedelic rock, and post-hardcore. The band currently consists of lead vocalist Kurt Travis, guitarists Sergio Medina and Will Swan, bass guitarist Steffen Gotsch, and drummer Joel Turcotte.

After the dissolution of the post-hardcore band Stolas, Medina formed Royal Coda as a project to experiment with new writing styles outside of his typical routine. After former A Lot Like Birds members Travis and Arrington joined the group, they recorded their self-titled debut album, Royal Coda, which was released in April 2018 on Blue Swan Records. In 2019, the band recruited Dance Gavin Dance guitarist Will Swan and touring bass guitarist Steffen Gotsch, releasing their sophomore studio album, Compassion, in November to critical acclaim. In 2020, the group recorded their third album To Only A Few At First, which was released on Blue Swan and Rise Records in August 2022. In December 2022, Medina confirmed via Instagram that Arrington had retired from music altogether.

== Formation ==
Royal Coda was founded by guitarist and musician Sergio Medina in 2017 after wanting to pursue a solo musical project that would explore new musical styles outside of his current projects. The band announced its formation on January 28, 2018, revealing that they signed to independent record label Blue Swan Records. The band originally consisted of Sergio Medina, also the guitarist for Sianvar, and Stolas (band), former Dance Gavin Dance and A Lot Like Birds vocalist Kurt Travis, and Sianvar and former A Lot Like Birds drummer Joseph Arrington.

The band's logo is a hand, palm up, with a flame above it.

== Career ==
=== 2017–18: Debut studio album ===
On January 29, 2018, Royal Coda announced that they had finished tracking their debut studio album. The group wrote and recorded their debut album at VuDu Studios in Port Jefferson, New York and was produced with Dominic Nastasi and Mike Watts. On February 16, 2018, the band premiered their debut single "Anything to Save". Another song, "Cut Me Under", was released on March 29, along with announcement of their self-titled debut studio album. A third song, "Breathe Correct", was released on April 12, 2018, with a streaming premiere on Substream Magazine.

Their self-titled debut studio album was made available to stream a day before its release date, on April 26, 2018, on New Noise Magazine.

The band performed their first two concerts at Family Vacation Music Festival in Sacramento, California on May 19 and at Chain Reaction in Anaheim, California, on May 20.

Drummer Joseph Arrington announced that the band were to record more new music in 2018.

On June 22, 2018, it was announced that Royal Coda would tour as support on American singer Tilian's headlining solo tour, from August 23 to September 23, 2018, in the United States. On July 16, it was confirmed that The Fall of Troy frontman Thomas Erak would join Royal Coda as a touring guitarist and backing vocalist.

On August 25, 2018, it was revealed that Erak and former Dance Gavin Dance bass guitarist Jason Ellis were official members of the band. However, Erak left the band halfway through Tilian's headlining tour reportedly focusing on his solo career, leaving Royal Coda to continue as a four-piece outfit.

=== 2019–2021: Compassion ===
On February 1, 2019, it was revealed that Royal Coda would perform at the 1st Annual Blue Swan Records Swanfest on March 30, 2019. On February 11, the group announced its first headlining tour, which took place from March 14 to March 30, 2019, in the United States, with support from Body Thief.

On June 4, 2019, it was revealed Royal Coda would tour as support on American post-hardcore band Hail the Sun's The Mental Knife North American tour from September 13 to October 13. On June 5, it was announced that Dance Gavin Dance guitarist Will Swan had joined the band and would write guitar parts for the group's second studio album; this marks the second musical group Sergio Medina and Swan have been a part of together in addition to Sianvar. Arrington confirmed that the group's second studio album was completed being mastered by Kris Crummett on August 13, 2019. The same month, bass guitarist Jason Ellis parted ways with the band due to personal issues, and was replaced by Steffen Gotsch.

On September 10, 2019, Royal Coda released the lead single off their upcoming second studio album, "Numbing Agent". It is their first release to feature Swan. On September 12, the band announced their second studio album, Compassion, with a scheduled release date of November 7, 2019. A second single, "Becoming the Memory", was released on September 30. On November 12, it was revealed that the group would tour as support on Dance Gavin Dance's 2020 spring tour with Animals As Leaders and Veil of Maya. On March 12, 2020, the tour was cancelled due to the COVID-19 pandemic.

On September 23, 2020, the group announced that they were writing their third studio album in September and were to begin recording sessions with Kris Crummett in October.

=== 2022–present: To Only A Few At First ===
Royal Coda was set to tour as support on Tilian's US headlining Factory Reset Tour in February and March 2022, but the tour was postponed by Tilian a month before the tour was set to start. On December 23, 2021, the group released the music video for the stand-alone single "Even If". "Even If" was released to digital download and streaming services on January 14, 2022.

On July 6, 2022, the band announced their third studio album, To Only A Few At First, and released two songs, "We Slowly Lose Hope For Things To Come" and "Screen Time Overload", the former of which had a music video premiere on Blue Swan Records channel on YouTube. The band performed as support on Dance Gavin Dance's US summer tour from July 26 to August 24, 2022, along with Body Thief.

In November 2022, it was revealed that drummer Joseph Arrington had retired from touring and performing live shows. Joel Turcotte, formerly of Catbamboo, stepped in during Dance Gavin Dance's Headline Tour "An Evening With Friends" in which Royal Coda opened.

After a brief hiatus, on May 13, 2026, the band would announce their "Nights Of The Blue Swan" tour and stated there would be new music before the tour, later releasing their single titled "Of The Mortal Self" on July 3, 2026.

== Musical style ==
Royal Coda has been labeled as post-hardcore, progressive rock, experimental rock, and post-rock.

== Band members ==
Current members

- Kurt Travis – vocals (2017–present)
- Sergio Medina – guitar, bass, programming (2017–present)
- Joel Turcotte – drums (2022–present; touring member 2022)
- Will Swan – guitar, bass (2019–present)
- Steffen Gotsch – bass (2020–present; touring member 2019–2020)

Touring members

- Skylar Caporicci – guitar (2018–2019)
- Jason Ellis – bass (2018–2019)
- Dakota Sammons – drums (2022)

Former members

- Thomas Erak – guitar, bass, background vocals (2018)
- Joseph Arrington – drums, percussion (2017–2022)

Timeline

== Discography ==
Studio albums

- Royal Coda (Blue Swan Records, 2018)
- Compassion (Blue Swan Records, 2019)
- To Only A Few At First (Blue Swan Records/Rise Records, 2022)

Singles

- "Anything to Save" (2018)
- "Cut Me Under" (2018)
- "Breathe Correct" (2018)
- "Numbing Agent" (2019)
- “Becoming The Memory” (2019)
- “The Innocence Of” (2019)
- "Even If" (2022)
- "Of The Mortal Self" (2026)

EPs

- We Slowly Lose Hope For Things To Come / Screen Time Overload (2022)
