= Will Swan (musician) =

American musician (born 1985)

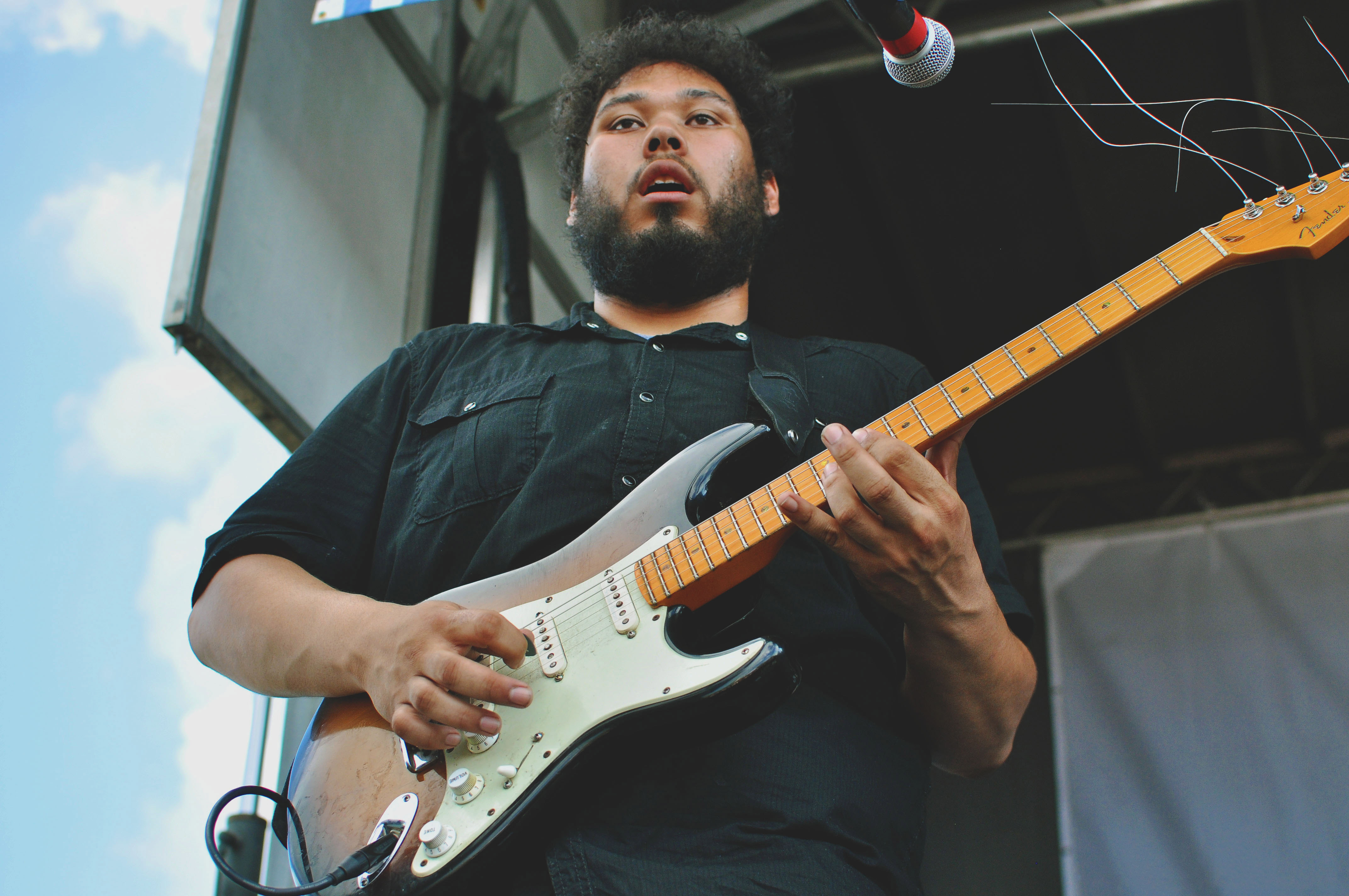
- Will Swan performing in 2011

Background information
- Born: William Swan; December 5, 1985 (age 40); San Francisco, California, U.S.
- Genres: Post-hardcore; math rock; experimental rock; emo; progressive rock; screamo; mathcore; metalcore; R&B
- Occupations: Musician; songwriter
- Instrument: Guitar
- Years active: 2003–present
- Labels: Rise; Blue Swan
- Member of: Dance Gavin Dance; Secret Band; Royal Coda; Sianvar
- Formerly of: Farewell Unknown

William Swan (born December 5, 1985) is an American musician and songwriter. He is best known as the lead guitarist and co-founder of the post-hardcore band Dance Gavin Dance and as the founder and owner of record label Blue Swan Records. He is also a guitarist in the band Secret Band, progressive rock band Royal Coda, and was a guitarist in the now defunct Sianvar.

Swan co-founded the Sacramento based post-hardcore band Farewell Unknown, releasing the album The 40 Day Fake Out in 2004, before disbanding. In 2005, he formed the band Dance Gavin Dance and released their debut extended play (EP), Whatever I Say Is Royal Ocean (2006), later signing to Rise Records. With the band, he has released 10 full-length studio albums, including the top 20 albums Mothership (2016), Artificial Selection (2018), and Afterburner (2020), and the top top-ten album Jackpot Juicer (2022), three live albums, and four one-off singles. When member Jon Mess left the band briefly in 2009, Will Swan provided unclean vocals for the bands 2009 album Happiness. In 2011, Swan, along with members of Dance Gavin Dance, formed the metalcore band Secret Band, releasing two full-length studio albums and one EP. In 2013, together with members of Stolas and A Lot Like Birds, he formed the post-hardcore supergroup Sianvar, releasing their self-titled debut EP in 2014 followed by their debut studio album, Stay Lost (2016), each on Swan's record label Blue Swan Records. After Sianvar disbanded in 2018, Swan joined the progressive rock band Royal Coda, participating on their second and third albums Compassion (2019) and To Only A Few At First (2022).

He launched the independent record label Blue Swan Records in 2013, signing bands such as Sianvar, Stolas, Hail the Sun, and Secret Band. In 2021, the label signed a publishing contract with BMG and partnered with Rise Records.

== Early life ==
Will Swan was born in Sacramento, California, on December 5, 1985, where he was born and raised. He is part African American and part Mexican. He became interested in pursuing a music career after seeing Green Day at Fillmore West in San Francisco at the age of 12, in December 1997.

== Career ==
=== 2003–05: Farewell Unknown ===
Will Swan began his music career as the founder and lead guitarist for the post-hardcore band Farewell Unknown with vocalist Joel Rabara, percussionist Drew Ochwat, guitarist Alvaro Alcala, and bass guitarist Eric Lodge. The band released one studio album, The 40 Day Fake Out, on October 19, 2004. After disbanding in 2005, Swan and Lodge both recruited drummer Matt Mingus and vocalists Jon Mess and Jonny Craig to form the post-hardcore band Dance Gavin Dance in 2005.

=== 2005–present: Dance Gavin Dance ===
Dance Gavin Dance formed in Sacramento, California, with members Jonny Craig, Jon Mess, Sean O'Sullivan, Eric Lodge, and Matthew Mingus, along with Swan. The band released their debut EP, Whatever I Say Is Royal Ocean on November 14, 2006, later signing a recording contract with Rise Records. They released the singles "And I Told Them I Invented Times New Roman" and "Lemon Meringue Tie", subsequently releasing their debut full-length studio album, Downtown Battle Mountain on May 15, 2007, through Rise and charted at No. 46 on the U.S. Billboard Top Heatseekers Albums chart. In 2008, Craig and O'Sullivan departed from the band and were later replaced by vocalist Kurt Travis and guitarist Zac Garren, releasing their sophomore self-titled studio album, Dance Gavin Dance, on August 19, 2008. In 2008, vocalist Jon Mess and bass guitarist Eric Lodge left the band. Swan pursued both lead and rhythm guitar along with unclean vocals and Lodge was replaced by Jason Ellis. Happiness was released as the band's third studio album on June 9, 2009, and was led by the singles "Don't Tell Dave" and "NASA." In 2010, original vocalists Jonny Craig and Jon Mess and bass guitarist Eric Lodge rejoined the band, which subsequently Travis, Garren, and Ellis left the band, and Dance Gavin Dance recorded their fourth studio album Downtown Battle Mountain II, a follow-up sequel to the band's debut studio album. The album was released on March 8, 2011, and charted at No. 82 on the Billboard 200, No. 13 on the Independent Albums chart, and No. 4 on the Hot Rock Albums chart.

Craig and Lodge each left the band throughout 2012, leading to vocalist Tilian Pearson, bass guitarist Tim Feerick, and guitarist Josh Benton joining the band. The band released their fifth studio album, Acceptance Speech on October 8, 2013, peaking at No. 42 on the Billboard 200, No. 13 on the Alternative Albums chart, No. 7 on the Independent Albums chart and No. 6 on the Top Hard Rock Albums chart. With Benton leaving the band following the album's release, Dance Gavin Dance released their sixth studio album, Instant Gratification, on April 14, 2015, charting at No. 32 on the Billboard 200, becoming their best-selling album to date. In celebration of the band's 10-year anniversary, they embarked on their 10 Year Anniversary North American Tour with supporting acts Slaves, A Lot Like Birds, Strawberry Girls, and Dayshell. The tour took place from November 13 to December 19, 2015.

On February 21, 2020, the group announced their ninth studio album, Afterburner, with a scheduled released date of April 24, 2020. On the same day, they released its lead single "Prisoner", accompanied with its music video. In December 2020, the group announced Tree City Sessions 2, which was released to digital download and streaming platforms on December 25. The live album was accompanied with a concert streaming event where the group performed a fan voted setlist on the Tower Bridge in Sacramento, California, which was broadcast on December 19.

On March 24, 2022, the band released the single "Synergy".

=== 2011–present: Secret Band ===
Along with other Dance Gavin Dance members Eric Lodge, Matthew Mingus, and Jon Mess, Will Swan formed the band Secret Band in 2011. The name of the band derives from the idea of keeping it a secret from other members of Dance Gavin Dance, more so from vocalist Jonny Craig. The band released their self-titled debut EP in June 2014.

=== 2013–2019: Sianvar ===
Sianvar is a post-hardcore supergroup founded by Will Swan with Hail the Sun's Donovan Melero (vocals), Stolas' Sergio Medina (guitar), A Lot Like Birds' Joseph Arrington (drums, percussion), and A Lot Like Birds' Michael Franzino (bass guitar). On November 8, 2013, the band released their first single, Sick Machine through Blue Swan Records. They released the Sianvar EP on January 5, 2014. Their debut studio album, Stay Lost, was released on August 4, 2016.

=== 2019–present: Royal Coda ===
On June 5, 2019, Swan was announced to be a guitarist in the American post-hardcore band Royal Coda, who are signed to his independent record label Blue Swan Records and consists of lead vocalist Kurt Travis, former Stolas guitarist Sergio Medina, and former A Lot Like Birds drummer Joe Arrington. Swan recorded guitar and bass guitar with producer Kris Crummett for the band's second studio album, Compassion, which was released on November 7, 2019. Swan's first tour with the group took place from September 13 to October 13, 2019, on Hail the Sun's US tour with Strawberry Girls and VIS. In a post on Facebook, Dance Gavin Dance confirmed that Compassion was a spiritual sequel to the group's 2009 studio album, Happiness, which also features both Kurt Travis and Will Swan.

On July 6, 2022, the band announced their third studio album, To Only A Few At First, and released two songs, "We Slowly Lose Hope For Things To Come" and "Screen Time Overload", the former of which had a music video premiere on Blue Swan Records channel on YouTube. The band performed as support on Dance Gavin Dance's US summer tour from July 26 to August 24, 2022, along with Body Thief.

On July 1, 2026, the band announced that they would be releasing a new single titled "Of The Mortal Self" on July 3, 2026

== Blue Swan Records ==
Will Swan founded and launched his own independent record label, named Blue Swan Records, in early 2013. The first groups Swan signed were American rock bands Stolas and Sianvar. The label's debut release was Living Creatures by Stolas, on March 14, 2013. The label is prominently known for signing the rock bands Hail the Sun, Icarus the Owl, Stolas and Wolf & Bear.

On February 18, 2021, it was announced that Blue Swan Records had partnered with Rise Records.

== Discography ==
=== with Farewell Unknown ===
- The 40 Day Fake Out (2004)

=== with Dance Gavin Dance ===
- Whatever I Say Is Royal Ocean (Rise, 2006)
- Downtown Battle Mountain (Rise, 2007)
- Dance Gavin Dance (Rise, 2008)
- Happiness (Rise, 2009)
- Downtown Battle Mountain II (Rise, 2011)
- Acceptance Speech (Rise, 2013)
- Instant Gratification (Rise, 2015)
- Tree City Sessions (Rise, 2016)
- Mothership (Rise, 2016)
- Artificial Selection (Rise, 2018)
- Afterburner (Rise, 2020)
- Tree City Sessions 2 (Rise, 2020)
- Jackpot Juicer (Rise, 2022)
- Pantheon (Rise, 2025)
- Tree City Sessions 3 (Rise, 2026)

=== with Sianvar ===
- Sianvar EP (Blue Swan, 2014)
- Stay Lost (Blue Swan, 2016)

=== with Secret Band ===
- SECRETBAND EP (Independent, 2011/Blue Swan, 2014)
- Secret Band (Blue Swan, 2014)
- LP2 (Rise, 2019)

=== with Royal Coda ===
- Compassion (Blue Swan, 2019)
- To Only A Few At First (Rise & Blue Swan, 2022)
