= Strawberry Girls =

American rock band

- Origin: Salinas, California, U.S.
- Genres: Progressive rock; experimental rock; post-hardcore
- Years active: 2011–present
- Labels: Tragic Hero; Spirit Vision Records
- Spinoff of: Dance Gavin Dance
- Members: Zachary Garren; Ben Rosett; Ian Jennings
- Website: www.tragicherorecords.co/strawberry-girls

Strawberry Girls is an American rock band from Salinas, California, formed in 2011. The band is currently composed of guitarist Zac Garren, drummer Ben Rosett, and bassist Ian Jennings. All three members are multi-instrumentalists and record producers.

== History ==
=== 2010–2013: Formation, Italian Ghosts, and debut album ===
Strawberry Girls formed shortly after guitarist Zachary Garren departed from post-hardcore band Dance Gavin Dance in February 2010. Garren then became acquainted with drummer Ben Rosett (formerly of The Trees) and subsequently began writing and recording music as Strawberry Girls. Soon after their first show as a duo, bassist Ian Jennings (also from The Trees) was added to complete the lineup. Garren spoke about the meaning behind the name Strawberry Girls in an interview with their label Tragic Hero Records. The name originally derives from a verse in the 1980 song "Christine" by English post-punk band Siouxsie and the Banshees. The band released their debut EP (extended play) album Italian Ghosts on October 28, 2011, independently. On June 25, 2012, the group released a cover of Carly Rae Jepsen's single "Call Me Maybe" which was reviewed as "dark and sexy" by The Air Space. The group also released a cover of Kendrick Lamar's single "Swimming Pools (Drank)" on December 2, 2012. The band recorded their debut studio album, French Ghetto, at Spirit Vision Studios in Carmel, California, and was later released on April 20, 2013, to Bandcamp. The album was later re-released through Tragic Hero Records on September 20, 2013. French Ghetto features guest appearances from Kurt Travis of A Lot Like Birds (formerly of Dance Gavin Dance), Shane Smit of Overtone, Nic Newsham of Gatsby's American Dream, Gavin Mulkey, and Kathleen Delano. Garren spoke about the guest vocalists and musicians on French Ghetto, stating:

"We decided to have different guest vocalists for a few different reasons. Originally, we had written a couple songs for the album that were shorter, a bit chill compared to our normal stuff, and had more pop based structures. Since we didn't really plan on playing those two songs live, we thought it'd be cool to get Kurt Travis, who I used to play with in Dance Gavin Dance, to collaborate on a full song for old time’s sake."

=== 2013–2015: American Graffiti ===
In June 2013, the band signed a recording contract with record label Tragic Hero Records. The band toured as a supporting act on the Into Orbit Tour with headliner Stolas from August 14 to September 17, 2013. Garren went into the studio with Kurt Travis and wrote and recorded guitar for Kurt's debut full-length studio album, Everything Is Beautiful, which was released on May 14, 2014. In support of the album, Garren toured with Travis from May 14 to June 7, 2014, with supporting acts Hotel Books and So Much Light in North America.

The band released their second studio album, American Graffiti, on November 27, 2015, through Tragic Hero Records.

Track 5 from American Graffiti, "Simon Vandetta", is named after the highest donor to their IndieGogo campaign to get a tour van, who is also the artist that did the cover art for Stolas release "Catalyst"

Strawberry Girls toured as an opening act on Dance Gavin Dance's 10 Year Anniversary Tour with A Lot Like Birds, Slaves, and Dayshell from November 14 to December 18, 2015.

=== 2016–present: Italian Ghosts remake and Tasmanian Glow ===
The group toured as support on the Super Chon Bros Tour with CHON and Polyphia from March 11 to April 15, 2016. On April 18, 2016, the band released their live studio EP, Strawberry Girls on Audiotree Live.

In June 2016, the band revealed that they would be releasing a reimagined album of their debut EP, Italian Ghosts. They completely re-recorded the EP and added new material and guest vocalists including former collaborators Nic Newsham (Gatsbys American Dream) and Joey Lancaster (Belle Noire), turning it into a full length, which released in February 2017, once again self-recorded at Spirit Vision Studios.

On May 31, 2017, Kurt Travis released the single "No Apologies", featuring Strawberry Girls, which was recorded and produced by Ben Rosett at Spirit Vision Studios.

On June 11, 2017, Houston rapper, Cee-Won X performed with Strawberry Girls during their Houston tour date. This is notable for being the first and only time that the band has performed or collaborated with a rap/hip hop artist in any capacity.

The band released Tasmanian Glow, their fourth studio album, in October 2019.

On February 7, 2023, Strawberry Girls announced the Prussian Gloom Tour. Body Thief, Standards and Tang opened for the group

== Musical style ==
Strawberry Girls' music style has been described as progressive rock, experimental rock, and post-hardcore.

== Achievements ==
The band's second studio album American Graffiti (2015) was ranked at No. 13 on Fecking Bahamas' list of the Top 50 Math Albums of 2015.

The band featured on two episodes of NBC's Last Call with Carson Daly, in 2016 and 2017.

== Members ==
Current

- Zachary Garren – guitar, bass, keyboards, programming, glockenspiel (2011–present)
- Ben Rosett – drums, percussion, bass, guitar, keys, recording, mixing, production (2011–present)
- Ian Jennings – bass guitar, keyboards (2011–present)

Session

- Robert Rosett – saxophone, flute, clarinet (2011–present)

== Discography ==
Studio albums

- French Ghetto (Tragic Hero, 2013)
- American Graffiti (Tragic Hero, 2015)
- Italian Ghosts (Tragic Hero, 2017)
- Tasmanian Glow (Tragic Hero, 2019)
- Prussian Gloom (2022)

Extended plays

- Demos 2011 (2011)
- Italian Ghosts (2011)
- Acoustic Ghosts (2012)
- Strawberry Girls on Audiotree Live - EP (2016)
