= Hail the Sun =

American post-hardcore band

- Origin: Chico, California, U.S.
- Genres: Post-hardcore; math rock; progressive rock; emo; screamo; metalcore
- Years active: 2009–present
- Labels: Equal Vision; Blue Swan; Rise; Rude
- Members: Donovan Melero; Shane Gann; Aric Garcia; John Stirrat; Allen Casillas
- Website: hailthesun.com

Hail the Sun is an American post-hardcore band from Chico, California. Formed in 2009, the band currently consists of lead vocalist and drummer Donovan Melero, guitarist Shane Gann, guitarist Aric Garcia, bass guitarist John Stirrat, and touring and studio drummer Allen Casillas. They are known for their eclectic progressive rock and math rock style, along with traditional elements of screamo and post-hardcore. They released their debut studio album, POW! Right In the Kisser! (2010), and EP, Elephantitis (2012), independently before signing to Blue Swan Records the following year. The group released their sophomore studio album, Wake, in 2014. In 2016, the band departed the label, signing to Equal Vision Records and releasing their third studio album, Culture Scars, on June 17, 2016, which charted at number 38 on the Billboard Top Rock Albums chart.

In 2017, the band released their second EP, Secret Wars, which was met with critical acclaim and was noted for the group's heavier and technical post-hardcore sound. They released their fourth studio album, Mental Knife, on September 28, 2018.

Hail the Sun has toured with Dance Gavin Dance, I the Mighty, Circa Survive, and Silverstein, among others. They have also performed at numerous music festivals such as Chain Fest at the Chain Reaction, South By So What?!, Horns Up Festival, and Swanfest.

== History ==
=== 2009–13: Formation, POW! Right In the Kisser, and Elephantitis ===
Originating in Chico, California, members Donovan Melero, Shane Gann, Aric Garcia, and John Stirrat formed Hail the Sun in 2009 whilst in college. They wrote and recorded their debut full-length studio album, POW! Right In the Kisser!, over the course of three months, and released it on May 21, 2010.

The band released the EP album Elephantitis on July 3, 2012. The creative process was heavily influenced by other post-hardcore musical groups such as the Fall of Troy and Hot Cross, and was dubbed "a sort of paradigm shift in the way post-hardcore can be played, combining a progressive hammer-on-pull-off heavy style of guitar playing and more free range drumming with a huge decrease in riffage, conventional time signatures and simplistic song structures resulted in a spastic, technically savvy sound which fit right in with the high energy mood and feel post-hardcore was known for."

=== 2014–17: Wake, Culture Scars, and Secret Wars EP ===
After three years of extensive touring, Hail the Sun met Sacramento, California-based post-hardcore band Dance Gavin Dance, eventually signing to Will Swan's independent record label Blue Swan Records. Hail the Sun released their critically acclaimed sophomore studio album, Wake, on September 23, 2014, through the label. Throughout 2014 and 2015, Hail the Sun toured extensively on respective tours from I the Mighty, Too Close to Touch, Dance Gavin Dance, A Lot Like Birds, the Ongoing Concept, Stolas, Polyphia, Our Last Night, Palisades, among several others. On December 3, 2015, it was revealed that the group had parted ways with Blue Swan Records and signed with Equal Vision Records, releasing a new demo version of the song "Paranoia". On March 25, 2016, the band released the official version of the single "Paranoia". On April 27, it was announced that Hail the Sun would release their third studio album, Culture Scars, on June 17, 2016. The band later toured on the 2016 Vans Warped Tour.

Speaking about the band's third album, Culture Scars, guitarist Shane Gann said, "Culture Scars is a term we came up with to refer to those scars, both physical and emotional, that come about due to certain things that society deems as normal and acceptable. We don’t normally put much thought into the amount of pain that may be caused by dirty politics, found within a family with a 'problem child', or existing behind the scenes of an adult entertainment shoot. These themes are so commonplace in the world, and yet there is often so much trauma and hurt that is brought about by all these scenarios. We wanted to shed some light on the darker side of what we think of as normalcy."

On November 8, 2017, Hail the Sun released the single "1109" and announced their EP Secret Wars, which was released on November 10, 2017.

=== 2018: Mental Knife ===
On January 2, 2018, Hail the Sun confirmed they were recording their fourth studio album with producer Beau Burchell of American post-hardcore band Saosin. The band released two new songs from the album on June 20, 2018, with the entirety of Mental Knife released on September 28, 2018.

=== 2019–21: New Age Filth ===
On September 4, 2019, Hail the Sun announced their new single and video on their Facebook page. The band later announced re-entering the studio to record their next studio album, New Age Filth. On April 16, 2021, their fifth studio album was released.

=== 2023–24: Divine Inner Tension ===
On January 5, 2023, Hail the Sun released a new song and music video, "Mind Rider". They later released their sixth studio album, Divine Inner Tension, on August 11, 2023. This was the first release by the band where the drums were not tracked in studio by Melero. On March 1, 2024, they released a new song, "Secondary Worship".

=== 2025–present: cut. turn. fade. back. ===
On June 23, 2025, Hail the Sun released a new song, "The Drooling Class". Then, on August 14, 2025, they released "War Crimes", ahead of the release of their seventh album, "cut. turn. fade. back.", released on October 24, 2025.

== Music and influence ==
Donovan Melero's vocal style has been often compared to that of recording artist Anthony Green of Circa Survive and Saosin's vocal style. Hail the Sun has been labelled as a post-hardcore band using elements of progressive rock, math rock, screamo, and emo in its music.

== Side projects ==
Along with fronting Hail The Sun, Donovan Melero also creates music as a solo artist, releasing his debut album "Chelsea Park After Dark" in 2022.

He is also a member of the bands Sianvar and Nova Charisma.

Donovan is also currently a booking agent for Sound Talent Group, and in 2020 he founded his own record label, magazine and festival under the brand Kill Iconic.

The bands guitarist, Shane Gann, is also a member of the bands Murals and Sufferrer, in which he doubles as both a guitarist and a vocalist.

== Members ==
Current members

- Donovan Melero – lead vocals, drums, percussion (2009–present)
- Shane Gann – guitars, backing vocals (2009–present)
- Aric Garcia – guitars (2009–present)
- John Stirrat – bass (2009–present)
- Allen Casillas – drums (2016–present; touring and studio)

== Discography ==
Studio albums

- POW! Right In the Kisser! (2010)
- Wake (Blue Swan Records, 2014)
- Culture Scars (Equal Vision, 2016)
- Mental Knife (Equal Vision / Rude, 2018)
- New Age Filth (Equal Vision / Rude, 2021)
- Divine Inner Tension (Equal Vision / Rude, 2023)
- cut. turn. fade. back (Equal Vision / Rude, 2025)

EPs

- Elephantitis (2012)
- Secret Wars (Equal Vision, 2017)
- Reimagined (Equal Vision / Rude, 2021)

Singles

- Devastate and Recalibrate (Equal Vision / Rude, 2019)
- Secondary Worship (Equal Vision / Rude, 2024)
- The Drooling Class (Equal Vision / Rude, 2025)
- War Crimes (Equal Vision / Rude, 2025)
- Blight (Equal Vision / Rude, 2025)
- Consumed With You (Equal Vision / Rude, 2025)
- Insensitive Tempo (Equal Vision / Rude, 2025)
- Relapse Is a Love Affair (Equal Vision / Rude, 2025)
