= Stolas (band) =

American band

- Origin: Las Vegas, Nevada, United States
- Genres: Post-hardcore; math rock; experimental rock; progressive rock
- Years active: 2011–2018, 2023-present
- Labels: Equal Vision; Blue Swan
- Members: Jason Weiche; Sergio Medina; Carlo Marquez; RJ Reynolds
- Past members: Bobby Lyons; Benjamin Gannon
- Website: https://www.facebook.com/StolasLV

Stolas (Sail the ocean, live at sea) is an American post-hardcore band from Las Vegas, Nevada formed in 2011. The band consisted of Carlo Marquez (lead vocals, drums, bass), and Sergio Medina (guitar, backing vocals). The band was signed as the first band on Blue Swan Records in 2013, a record label launched by Will Swan of Dance Gavin Dance. They have released one EP, Losing Wings (2012) and three studio albums, Living Creatures (2013), Allomaternal (2014), and Stolas (2017). The group signed to Equal Vision Records in 2016.

Stolas are prominently known for combining progressive elements with post-hardcore music.

== History ==
=== Formation and "Losing Wings" EP (2011–2012) ===
Guitarist and vocalist Jason Weiche and drummer Carlo Marquez grew up in Kingman, Arizona and began playing music together in middle school. They worked together on many musical endeavors, and both moved to Las Vegas, Nevada. For two years Marquez and Weiche played in a local Las Vegas band, The Akashic Record.

Guitarist Sergio Medina, and bassist RJ Reynolds attended the same performing-arts high school in Las Vegas and both participated in local music acts. They were both part of the band Elessar, and Sergio also was a part of the band, Inherit the Sky.

In 2011, the four came together as a group and co-wrote the song "Time & The Sun." By the end of the year, the four-piece began recording music under the name Stolas and had recorded their debut EP titled "Losing Wings", using an older model Dell computer. Losing Wings was released independently in 2012.

=== Signing to Blue Swan Records and "Living Creatures" (2012–2013) ===
During a break from touring with Stolas, Medina filled in as a guitarist for Hail the Sun and became the guitar technician for both Hail the Sun and Dance Gavin Dance on the Rock Yourself to Sleep tour in late 2012. Medina showed Stolas' work to Will Swan, who signed the band with his newly created Blue Swan Records label. Stolas recorded their full-length debut album, Living Creatures, Decoy Music. at Pus Cavern Studio in Sacramento. Peers of Swan and other vocalist in similar bands were featured on the album including former Dance Gavin Dance vocalists Tilian Pearson, Jonny Craig, Kurt Travis (formerly of A Lot Like Birds), Corey Lockwood (also of A Lot Like Birds), and Donovan Melero of Hail the Sun. The album was released on March 14, 2013. Living Creatures was favorably reviewed by the public.

=== "Allomaternal" and departure of Jason Weiche (2014–2015) ===
The band's second album, Allomaternal, was released on November 7, 2014, through Blue Swan Records. A concept album based on a story created by bassist RJ Reynolds, "Allomaternal" was considered a great follow up to the good reviews and growing fan base "Living Creatures" created for the band. After much touring with bands like Dance Gavin Dance and Letlive, the quartet became the headlining band for their "Allomaternal Tour" with support from Artifex Pereo, Eidola and Icarus the Owl.

On October 22, 2015, it was revealed that lead vocalist guitarist Jason Weiche left the band. To quote the post , "...we wish Jason all the success in the world in future musical projects along with his promising career in graphic design. He remains a great friend to all of us, and the last four years working with him have been unforgettable." The trio have continued writing music without him, with Marquez providing lead vocals, Sergio providing more vocal duties and a new member to be announced by the end of 2015 to play drums for the band along with the new album.

=== Stolas (2016–2018) ===
On March 10, 2016, the band released their new song "Catalyst" with Carlo on vocals. The song serves as a single version as it will be remastered for the new album.

On December 7, 2016, the band announced that they had signed to Equal Vision Records. The group's self-titled third studio album was released on March 17, 2017.

On April 28, 2017, RJ Reynolds departed from the band.

On May 23, 2018, the band announced their break-up after a final run of shows with the original lineup.

The band formally announced their break-up on August 7, 2018.

=== Reunion (2023–) ===
On July 24, 2023, Stolas reunited in their original formation for a one-off show at the Troubadour in Los Angeles, CA, in which they performed their first album, "Living Creatures", in its entirety. Later that year, they performed at Dance Gavin Dance's Swanfest in Philadelphia.

On December 18, 2024, the band announced via social media that they would be reuniting again for a tour in March 2025, celebrating the ten-year anniversary of their first two records.

== Band members ==
Current members

- Carlo Marquez – drums, lead vocals (2011–2018, 2023–present); bass (2017)
- Sergio Medina – lead guitar, backing vocals (2011–2018, 2023–present); rhythm guitar, lead vocals (2015–2018)
- RJ Reynolds – bass (2011–2017, 2023–present)
- Jason Weiche – rhythm guitar, lead vocals (2011–2015, 2023–present)

Former members

- Bobby Lyons – bass (2017–2018)

Former touring members

- Carlos Silva – drums (2016)
- Tim Brown – guitar (2017)
- Nathan Sletner – drums (2017–2018)

Timeline

== Discography ==
Studio albums

- Living Creatures (2013) Blue Swan Records
- Allomaternal (2014) Blue Swan Records
- Stolas (2017) Equal Vision Records

EPs

- Losing Wings EP (2012) self-released
