= A Lot Like Birds =

American post-hardcore band

- Also known as: ALLB • A Lot Like Birds and Nothing Like Fish
- Origin: Sacramento, California, U.S.
- Genres: Post-hardcore; math rock; experimental rock; progressive rock
- Years active: 2009–2018, 2024–present
- Labels: Equal Vision; Born Losers
- Members: Kurt Travis; Michael Franzino; Joseph Arrington; Andy Cizek
- Past members: Cory Lockwood; Ben Wiacek; Michael Littlefield; Matt Coate; Matt Sunderland; Tyler Lydell; Athena Koumis
- Website: alotlikebirds.com

A Lot Like Birds (often abbreviated as ALLB) is an American post-hardcore band formed in 2009 in Sacramento, California. Before their breakup in 2018, ALLB had released four albums: an independent debut Plan B (2009), and three LPs under Equal Vision Records - Conversation Piece (2011), No Place (2014) and DIVISI (2017). ALLB reunited in early 2024 and has continued to play live shows and release new music since then.

== History ==
=== Formation and Plan B (2009–2010) ===
The band formed in Sacramento when guitarist/vocalist Michael Franzino invited local musicians to collaborate on an album. The result was A Lot Like Birds's debut album Plan B. Released in 2009, the album was largely instrumental and experimental, featuring horns, strings, and guest vocals in addition to screamed vocals and post-hardcore arrangements. It has been widely distributed for free online by the band.

Following the album's release, A Lot Like Birds formed a core around five of the musicians involved: Franzino and Ben Wiacek (Vegan Discharge) on guitar, Michael Littlefield on bass, Joe Arrington on drums, and Cory Lockwood (Vegan Discharge) on vocals. The other musicians that appeared on the album would appear at live shows as guest performers, and the band took to describing themselves as a "5–8 piece" outfit.

=== Addition of Kurt Travis and Conversation Piece (2011) ===
In January 2011, A Lot Like Birds confirmed that singer Kurt Travis would be joining the band, after the information had already leaked online. Travis, who had previously fronted Dance Gavin Dance, had originally planned to collaborate with A Lot Like Birds for a track, but decided to join after seeing how well he and the band fit together.

Travis soon formed a connection at Doghouse Records, and in April A Lot Like Birds announced that they had signed to the label, despite not having any music to showcase beyond Plan B. The first demo recorded with Kurt Travis was for the song "Tantrum (Far from the Tree, the Apple Grew Rotten)", an eight-minute, uncommonly structured song that leaked onto the internet in March, before the signing was announced.

Having generated a steady buzz, A Lot Like Birds released their second album, Conversation Piece, to much anticipation on October 11. With more focus on vocals than on their first album, Conversation Piece was also less experimental and more focused on post-hardcore elements. The release was generally well received by fans of the genre. With their second album under their belt, the band set out on their first national tour with Just Like Vinyl and Dance Gavin Dance.

=== Signing to Equal Vision and No Place (2012–2014) ===
On August 8, 2012, it was announced that A Lot Like Birds had signed to Equal Vision Records. On September 12, 2013, Equal Vision Records and A Lot Like Birds announced that a new album, No Place, would be released on October 29. A new song entitled "Kuroi Ledge" was released on October 4. A music video for the song "Next to Ungodliness" was released on October 25.

No Place debuted at number 199 on the Billboard 200 and number 6 on the Heatseekers Album Chart. The album focuses on the idea of "home" and continues the theme of the group's lyrical focus and use of spoken word in their music. The songs of No Place shine a spotlight on what constitutes a home and the emotional attachments or lack thereof within various rooms of a house.

An animated music video for the song "Connector" was released on January 9, 2014.

=== Kurt Travis' departure, DIVISI, breakup and post-breakup releases (2015–2019) ===
The band announced on February 28, 2015, that bassist Michael Littlefield had left the band. On June 26, 2015, the band announced Matt Coate as their new bassist while on tour, and guitarist Michael Franzino released a debut full-length studio album for his side project, alone. On February 20, 2016, the band announced Kurt Travis' departure from the band. Travis cited a change in the band's direction as his reason for leaving. In Travis's absence, Cory Lockwood took vocal lessons to expand his vocal abilities for the new album, with additional vocals performed by Matt Coate. On March 8, 2017, the band released a teaser video for the album, titled DIVISI. The album was released on May 5, 2017.

On February 17, 2018, the band announced on their Facebook page that they would be breaking up following almost ten years together.

On July 19, 2019, instrumental versions of ALLB albums Conversation Piece, No Place and DIVISI were released via Equal Vision Records.

=== Reunion (2024–present) ===
On December 12, 2023, the band announced that they'd be performing a one-off reunion set at Kill Iconic Fest on March 23, 2024 at The House of Blues in Anaheim. Later, an additional show was added to be held on March 21, 2024. The reunion line-up consisted of vocalist Kurt Travis, guitarist Michael Franzino, and drummer Joseph Arrington with other musicians brought in as special guests, including bassist Reese Ortenberg (of Eidola), guitarist Greg Almeida (Secret Gardens, ex-VISTA) and vocalist Matthew Fitzpatrick (ex-My Iron Lung). With Lockwood being notably absent from this reunion, only material from the albums Travis was involved with was performed at these initial shows, though on later tours the band would begin playing DIVISI material again.

On May 17, 2024, A Lot Like Birds were announced as a support act for Saosin at their California shows on May 30 and 31, 2024. Then, on June 18, 2024, the band was announced as support for Hail The Sun on their 'Wake' 10 Year Anniversary tour the same year. On August 10, 2024, Andy Cizek of Monuments and Makari was announced as a touring co-vocalist taking over harsh vocal duties during this tour. Cizek departed the tour toward its conclusion and harsh vocals were taken over by Blair de Leon for its remainder. In 2025, Cizek returned to touring with the band.

In a Reddit AMA on October 29, 2024, touring guitarist Greg Almeida stated that to the best of his knowledge, the band intended to record new music in the future.

From May to June 2025, A Lot Like Birds joined The Fall of Troy on their tour for the 20th anniversary of Doppelgänger.

On July 11, 2025, the band announced their first headlining tour since reuniting. Later that month, they announced that they would be releasing new music for the first time in 8 years that October, featuring Travis and Cizek on vocals, Almeida on guitar, and Ortenberg on bass.

A Lot Like Birds released "When in Love" featuring Geoff Rickly of Thursday on October 1, 2025, marking their first official release following their reunion. The description for the song's music video confirmed Cizek as an official member of the band's lineup, and a formal announcement of his membership was later made on social media.

On August 10, 2026, the band posted a video confirming a fifth studio album was in the works and teasing collaboration with producer Sam Pura and guitarist Zachary Garren. On August 18, they released the single "Mausoleum," with an accompanying music video and announcement of their signing to Born Losers Records.

== Band members ==
Current lineup

- Michael Franzino – lead guitar (2009–2018, 2024–present), vocals (2009–2011, 2024–present)
- Joseph Arrington – drums (2009–2018, 2024–present)
- Kurt Travis – vocals (2011–2016, 2018, 2024–present)
- Andy Cizek – vocals (2025–present; touring 2024–2025)

Touring members

- Reese Ortenberg – bass guitar (2024–present)
- Greg Almeida – guitars (2024–present)

Former members

- Cory Lockwood – vocals (2009–2018)
- Ben Wiacek – rhythm guitar (2009–2018)
- Juli Lydell – keyboards, backing vocals (2009)
- Matt Sunderland – trumpets, xylophones (2009)
- Tyler Lydell – drums (2009)
- Athena Koumis – violins (2009–2010)
- Michael Littlefield – bass guitar (2009–2015)
- Matt Coate – bass guitar (2015–2018), vocals (2016–2018)

Former touring members

- Matthew Fitzpatrick – vocals (2024)
- Blair de Leon – vocals (2024, 2026)

== Discography ==
Studio albums

- Plan B (2009)
- Conversation Piece (2011)
- No Place (2013)
- DIVISI (2017)

Music videos

- "Think Dirty Out Loud" (2011)
- "Vanity's Fair" (2013)
- "Next to Ungodliness" (2013)
- "Connector" (2014)
- "For Shelley (Unheard)" (2017)
- "The Sound of Us" (2017)
- "Trace the Lines" (2017)
- "When In Love" ft. Geoff Rickly (2025)
- "Mausoleum" (2026)
