= List of Dance Gavin Dance band members =

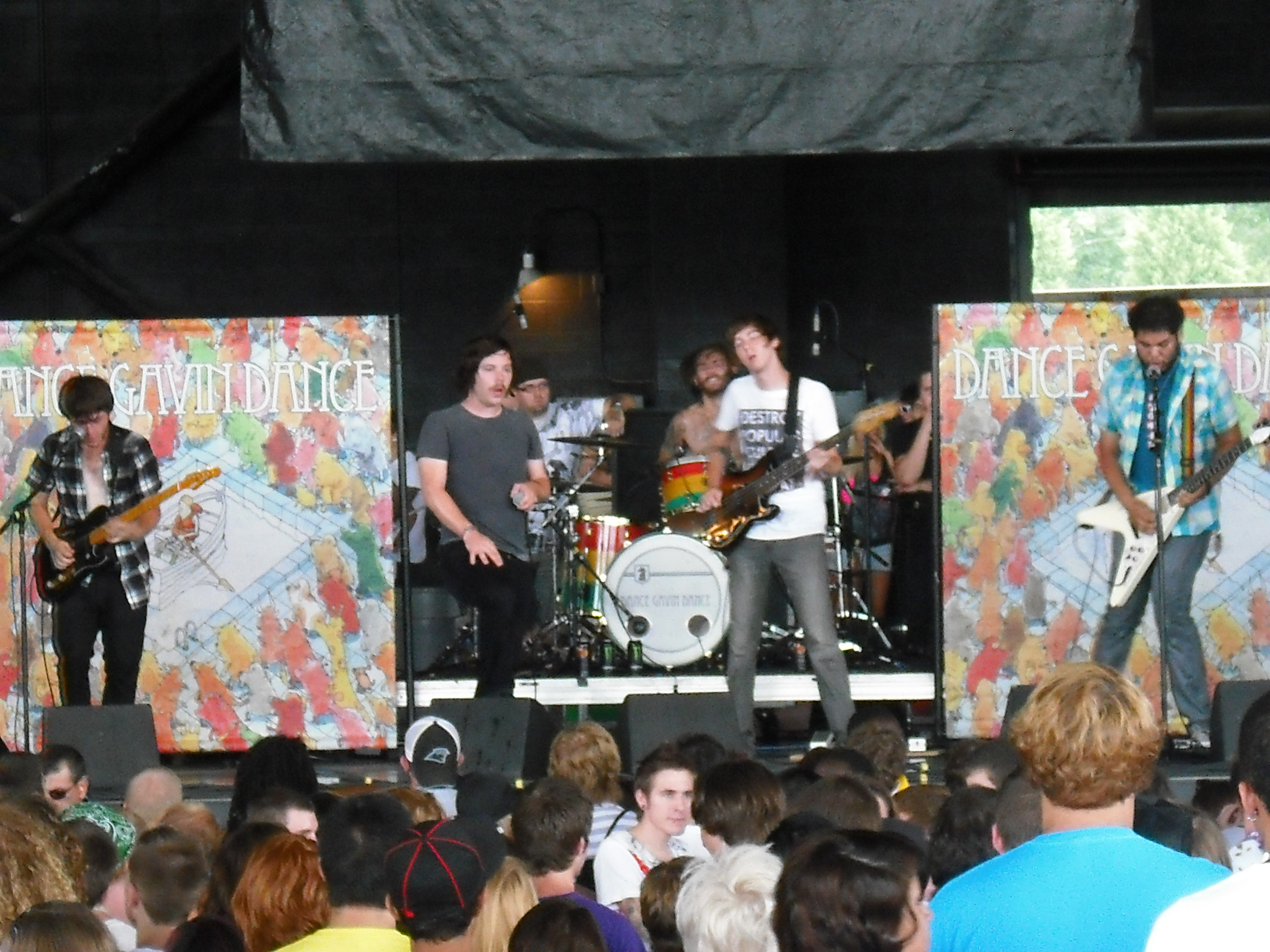
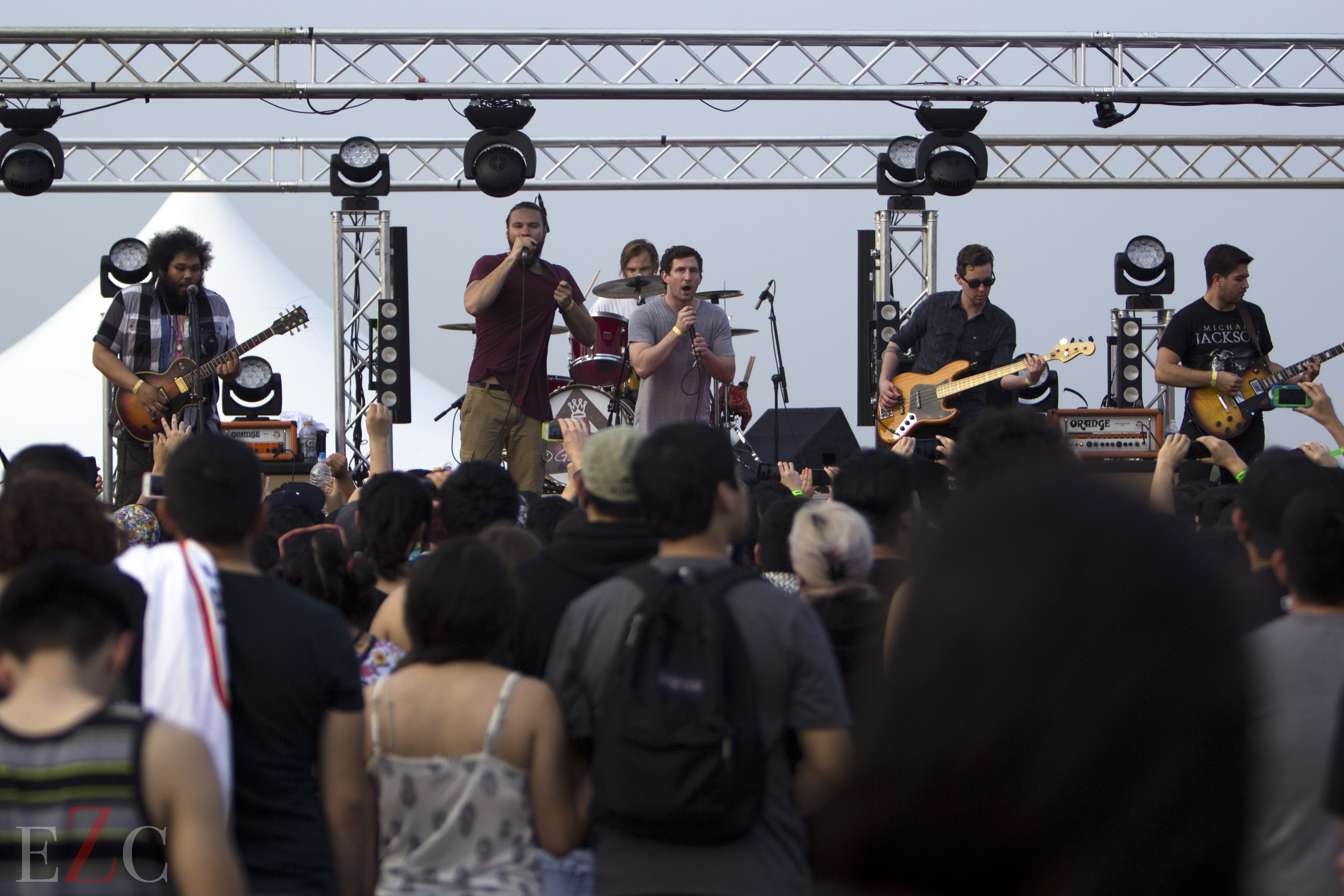
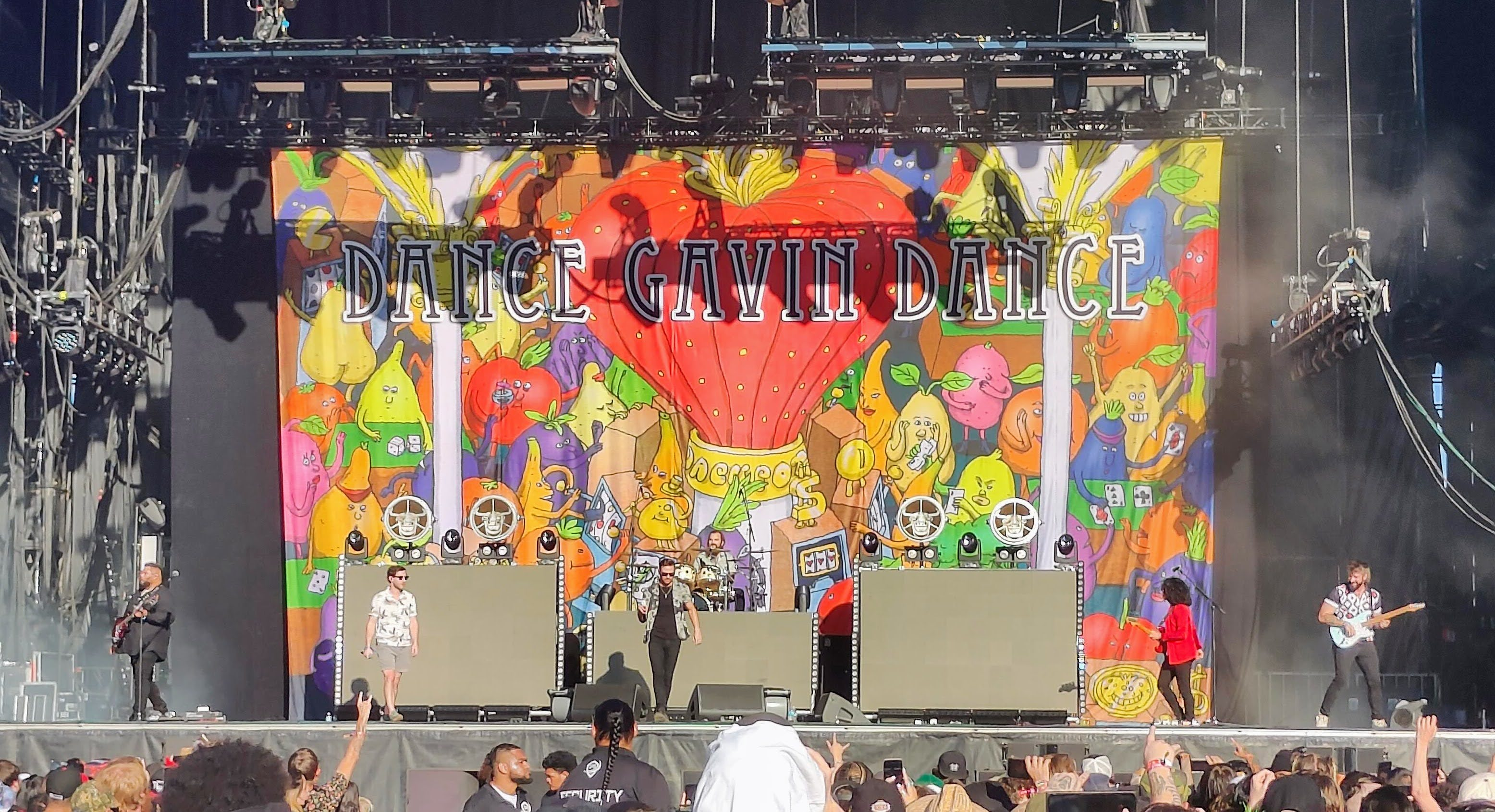
Three line-ups of Dance Gavin Dance performing in 2009, 2015 and 2023

Dance Gavin Dance is an American rock band founded in Sacramento by guitarists Will Swan and Alvaro Alcala, drummer Matt Mingus and bassist Eric Lodge after their previous band, Farewell Unknown, disbanded in 2005. The band's first line-up also included vocalists Jon Mess and Jonny Craig. The band currently consists of constant members Swan and Mingus, as well as Mess (who was absent from 2008 to 2010), and vocalist/guitarist Andrew Wells (who first joined as a touring member in 2015). The band also tours with bassist Sergio Medina (who first toured as guitarist in 2021 and again as bassist since 2022), and guitarist Martin Bianchini (since 2024, having played on sessions since 2015).

== History ==
The band parted ways with Alvaro Alcala in early 2006, with his replacement being Sean O'Sullivan. O'Sullivan departed in August 2007, after appearing on the band's debut album Downtown Battle Mountain, and was replaced by Zachary Garren. The band also parted ways with vocalist Jonny Craig in November 2007, with Kurt Travis announced as his replacement the following month. In 2008, the band parted ways with bassist Eric Lodge and vocalist Jon Mess.

Lodge was replaced by Jason Ellis, and Swan took up unclean vocals. Ellis appeared on Happiness (2009) before departing and was replaced by Tim Feerick. In February 2010, Garren left the band, Daniel Snook was his temporary replacement before him and Feerick left. In May 2010, both Lodge and Mess returned to the band, and Josh Benton joined the band as touring guitarist. Craig also re-joined that August, replacing Travis. Lodge quietly left the band again in December 2011, with Jordan McCoy having toured with the band since earlier in the year. Kurt Travis briefly returned in February 2012, alongside Matt Geise (Lower Definition) as a substitute for Craig. Craig parted ways with the band in late 2012, with Tilian Pearson replacing him. Tim Feerick returned also in late 2012, and Josh Benton became the band's official second guitarist.

Benton parted ways with the band in 2013, shortly after appearing on Acceptance Speech. Aric Garcia filled in as a touring member between 2014 and 2015, as did in Alex Whitcomb in 2015. Both Craig and Travis briefly returned in 2015 for some anniversary shows. Andrew Wells took over rhythm guitar on a more permanent basis in 2015 but did not become an official member until 2021. In April 2022, longtime bassist Tim Feerick died.

In June 2022, Pearson stepped away from the band due to allegations of sexual assault levelled against him. In his place Wells took over lead vocals, with Mark Okubo taking over Wells' position as rhythm guitarist. Former vocalist Kurt Travis also handled vocals at some shows. Pearson returned to the band in November, although he permanently parted ways with the band in April 2024. The following month the band confirmed Wells as permanent clean vocalist, with session guitarist Martin Bianchini playing second guitar in Wells' place.

== Members ==
=== Current members ===
Image	Name	Years active	Instruments	Release contributions
	Will Swan	2005–present	guitar; backing vocals; rap vocals (2009–present); unclean vocals (2008–2010, 2025–present)	all releases
	Matt Mingus	2005–present	drums; percussion	all releases
	Jon Mess	2005–2008; 2010–present	unclean vocals; additional clean vocals (2025–present)	all releases except Happiness (2009)
	Andrew Wells	2021–present (session/touring 2015–2021)	guitar; clean vocals; lead vocals (2022, 2024–present)	all releases from Mothership (2016) onwards

=== Former members ===
Image	Name	Years active	Instruments	Release contributions
	Eric Lodge	2005–2008; 2010–2011	bass; backing vocals (2005–2008)	all releases from Whatever I Say Is Royal Ocean (2006) to Downtown Battle Mountain II (2011), except Happiness (2009)
	Jonny Craig	2005–2007; 2010–2012 (touring 2015–2016)	lead vocals	Whatever I Say Is Royal Ocean (2006); Downtown Battle Mountain (2007); Downtown Battle Mountain II (2011)
	Alvaro Alcala	2005–2006	guitar	none
	Sean O'Sullivan	2005–2007 (touring member 2010)	guitar	Whatever I Say Is Royal Ocean (2006); Downtown Battle Mountain (2007)
	Zachary Garren	2007–2010 (touring 2015; session 2015–2020)	guitar; backing vocals	Dance Gavin Dance (2008); Happiness (2009); all releases from Instant Gratification (2015) to Afterburner (2020)
	Kurt Travis	2007–2010 (touring 2012, 2015–2016, 2022, 2025)	lead vocals	Dance Gavin Dance (2008); Happiness (2009); Artificial Selection (2018) guest vocals
	Jason Ellis	2008–2009	bass	Happiness (2009)
	Tim Feerick	2009–2010; 2012–2022 (until his death)	bass	all releases from Acceptance Speech (2013) to Jackpot Juicer (2022)
	Tilian Pearson	2012–2024 (hiatus 2022)	lead vocals	all releases from Acceptance Speech (2013) to Jackpot Juicer (2022)
	Josh Benton	2012–2013 (session 2016; touring 2010–2012)	guitar	Acceptance Speech (2013); Tree City Sessions (2016)

=== Touring musicians ===
Image	Name	Years active	Instruments	Notes
	Dan Snook	2010	guitar	Snook toured following Garren's departure before he left alongside Feerick and Benton joined.
	Tony Marks	2010	bass	Marks joined along Benton following Feerick's departure.
	Jordan McCoy	2011–2012	bass	McCoy toured in place of Lodge and continued after his departure until Feerick returned.
	Matt Geise	2012	clean vocals	Geise and Kurt Travis briefly replaced Craig in 2012.
	Aric Garcia	2014–2015 (session 2015)	guitar	Toured following Benton's departure. Instant Gratification (2015)
	Alex Whitcomb	2015	guitar	Toured following Benton's departure. Instant Gratification (2015)
	Joey Rubenstein	2017; 2018	guitar	
	Louie Balthazar	2018 (session 2022)	guitar	Artificial Selection (2018); Jackpot Juicer (2022)
	Dakota Sammons	2021	drums	Sammons performed with the band after Mingus went into rehab.
	Sergio Medina	2021; 2022–present (session 2020–present)	bass (2022–present); guitar (2021)	Medina also first performed with the band on guitar when Pearson caught Covid and Wells had to fill in on vocals, he later returned on bass following Feerick's death.: Afterburner (2020); Jackpot Juicer (2022); Pantheon (2025)
	Marc Okubo	2021; 2022	guitar	Okubo first performed with the band when Pearson caught Covid and Wells had to fill in on vocals, he later returned when Pearson stepped down in 2022. Afterburner (2020)
	Martin Bianchini	2024–present (session 2015–present)	guitar	Bianchini joined after Wells took up lead vocalist permanently. all releases from Instant Gratification (2015) onwards

== Line-ups ==
Period	Members	Releases
2005 – early 2006	Jonny Craig – lead vocals; Jon Mess – unclean vocals; Will Swan – guitar, backing vocals; Alvaro Alcala – guitar; Eric Lodge – bass, backing vocals; Matt Mingus – drums, percussion	none
early 2006 – August 2007	Jonny Craig – lead vocals; Jon Mess – unclean vocals; Will Swan – guitar, backing vocals; Eric Lodge – bass, backing vocals; Matt Mingus – drums, percussion; Sean O'Sullivan – guitar	Whatever I Say Is Royal Ocean (2006); Downtown Battle Mountain (2007)
August – November 2007	Jonny Craig – lead vocals; Jon Mess – unclean vocals; Will Swan – guitar, backing vocals; Eric Lodge – bass, backing vocals; Matt Mingus – drums, percussion; Zachary Garren – guitar, backing vocals	none
December 2007 – autumn 2008	Jon Mess – unclean vocals; Will Swan – guitar, backing vocals; Eric Lodge – bass, backing vocals; Matt Mingus – drums, percussion; Zachary Garren – guitar, backing vocals; Kurt Travis – lead vocals	Dance Gavin Dance (2008)
August 2008 – mid 2009	Will Swan – guitar, unclean vocals, rapping; Matt Mingus – drums, percussion; Zachary Garren – guitar, backing vocals; Kurt Travis – lead vocals; Jason Ellis – bass	Happiness (2009)
mid 2009 – early 2010	Will Swan – guitar, unclean vocals, rapping; Matt Mingus – drums, percussion; Zachary Garren – guitar, backing vocals; Kurt Travis – lead vocals; Tim Feerick – bass	none
early – May 2010	Will Swan – guitar, unclean vocals, rapping; Matt Mingus – drums, percussion; Kurt Travis – lead vocals; Tim Feerick – bass; Dan Snook – guitar (touring)	none
May – August 2010	Will Swan – guitar, backing vocals, rapping; Matt Mingus – drums, percussion; Kurt Travis – lead vocals; Jon Mess – unclean vocals; Tony Marks – bass (touring); Josh Benton – guitar (touring)	none
August 2010 – mid 2011	Will Swan – guitar, backing vocals, rapping; Matt Mingus – drums, percussion; Jon Mess – unclean vocals; Josh Benton – guitar (touring); Eric Lodge – bass; Jonny Craig – lead vocals	Downtown Battle Mountain II (2011)
mid 2011 – late 2012	Will Swan – guitar, backing vocals, rapping; Matt Mingus – drums, percussion; Jon Mess – unclean vocals; Josh Benton – guitar (touring); Jonny Craig – lead vocals; Jordan McCoy – bass (touring)	none
late 2012 – October 2013	Will Swan – guitar, backing vocals, rapping; Matt Mingus – drums, percussion; Jon Mess – unclean vocals; Josh Benton – guitar; Tilian Pearson – lead vocals; Tim Feerick – bass	Acceptance Speech (2013)
early 2014 – autumn 2015	Will Swan – guitar, backing vocals, rapping; Matt Mingus – drums, percussion; Jon Mess – unclean vocals; Tilian Pearson – lead vocals; Tim Feerick – bass; Aric Garcia – guitar (touring and session)	Instant Gratification (2015)
2015	Will Swan – guitar, backing vocals, rapping; Matt Mingus – drums, percussion; Jon Mess – unclean vocals; Tilian Pearson – lead vocals; Tim Feerick – bass; Alex Whitcomb – guitar (touring)	none
late 2015 – April 2022	Will Swan – guitar, backing vocals, rapping; Matt Mingus – drums, percussion; Jon Mess – unclean vocals; Tilian Pearson – lead vocals; Tim Feerick – bass; Andrew Wells – guitar, backing and clean vocals (session/touring until 2021)	Mothership (2016); Artificial Selection (2018); Afterburner (2020); Tree City Sessions 2 (2020); Jackpot Juicer (2022)
April – June 2022	Will Swan – guitar, backing vocals, rapping; Matt Mingus – drums, percussion; Jon Mess – unclean vocals; Tilian Pearson – lead vocals; Andrew Wells – guitar, backing and clean vocals; Sergio Medina – bass (touring)	none
June – November 2022	Will Swan – guitar, backing vocals, rapping; Matt Mingus – drums, percussion; Jon Mess – unclean vocals; Andrew Wells – lead vocals, guitar; Sergio Medina – bass (touring); Marc Okubo – guitar (touring); Kurt Travis – vocals (touring guest)	none
November 2022 – April 2024	Will Swan – guitar, backing vocals, rapping; Matt Mingus – drums, percussion; Jon Mess – unclean vocals; Andrew Wells – guitar, backing and clean vocals; Sergio Medina – bass (touring); Tilian Pearson – lead vocals	none
April 2024 – present	Will Swan – guitar, backing vocals, rapping; Matt Mingus – drums, percussion; Jon Mess – unclean vocals; Andrew Wells – lead vocals, guitar; Sergio Medina – bass (touring); Martin Bianchini – guitar (touring)	Pantheon (2025)
