= Dance Gavin Dance discography =

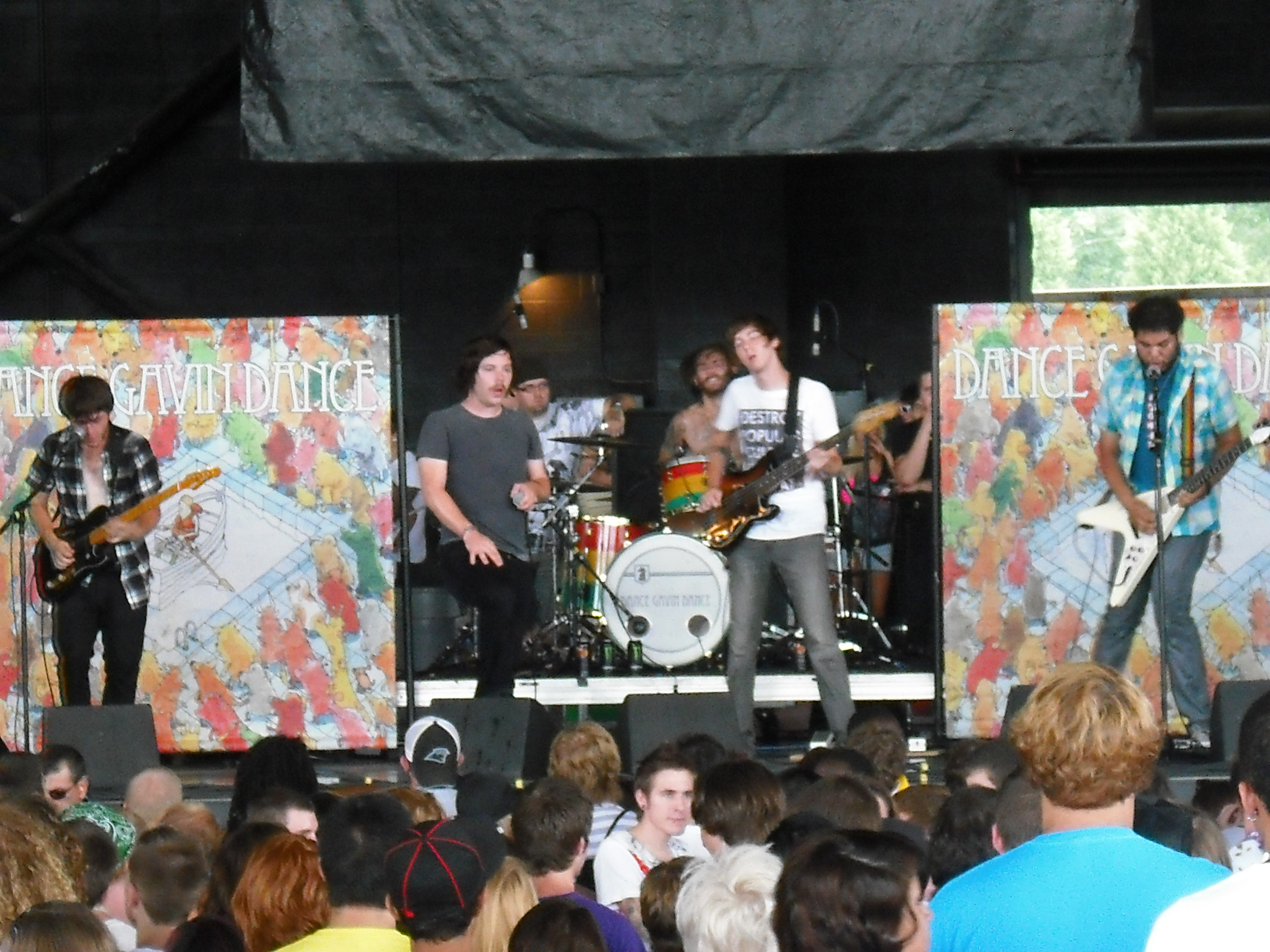
- Dance Gavin Dance performing in 2009
- Studio albums: 11
- EPs: 1
- Live albums: 4
- Singles: 46
- Music videos: 26
- Remastered albums: 1
- Instrumental albums: 10

The American post-hardcore band Dance Gavin Dance has released eleven studio albums, three live albums, one extended play, 45 singles, 26 music videos, one remastered album, and 9 instrumental albums. The band was formed in Sacramento, California in 2005 by guitarist Will Swan, drummer Matt Mingus, and bassist Eric Lodge. Unclean vocalist Jon Mess and clean vocalist Jonny Craig were recruited shortly after. They self-released their debut EP, Whatever I Say Is Royal Ocean, that year, and re-released the EP in 2006 after signing to Rise Records. Their debut studio album, Downtown Battle Mountain, was released May 15, 2007 on Rise.

Dance Gavin Dance is known for their series of line-up changes. After the release of Downtown Battle Mountain, guitarist Sean O'Sullivan left the group, and was replaced by Zachary Garren. Shortly after, Jonny Craig was removed from the band due to personal conflicts. He was replaced by Kurt Travis, who performed clean vocals on the band's self-titled second album. Mess and Lodge left the band prior to the album's release on August 19, 2008, and Swan performed unclean vocals as well as lead guitar on Happiness, released June 9, 2009. By 2010, Dance Gavin Dance decided to make one final album with their original line-up before breaking up. After the release of Downtown Battle Mountain II on March 8, 2011, the group agreed not to disband.

After Craig's second departure in 2012 and subsequent replacement with former Tides of Man vocalist Tilian Pearson, Dance Gavin Dance has maintained a stable lineup. They released their first album with Pearson, Acceptance Speech, on October 8, 2013. This was followed by the release of Instant Gratification (2015), Mothership (2016), Artificial Selection (2018), Afterburner (2020), and Jackpot Juicer (2022). Beginning in May 2019, the band began releasing instrumental versions of their studio albums, working backwards from Artificial Selection.

== Albums ==
=== Studio albums ===
List of studio albums, with selected chart positions
Title	Album details	Peak chart positions					
Title	Album details	US	US Rock	US Alt.	US Ind.	US Mtl.	AUS
Downtown Battle Mountain	Released: May 15, 2007 (US); Label: Rise; Format: CD, digital, LP	—	—	—	—	—	—
Dance Gavin Dance	Released: August 19, 2008 (US); Label: Rise; Format: CD, digital, LP	172	—	—	26	—	—
Happiness	Released: June 9, 2009 (US); Label: Rise; Format: CD, digital, LP	143	—	—	30	—	—
Downtown Battle Mountain II	Released: March 8, 2011 (US); Label: Rise; Format: CD, digital, LP	82	19	11	13	4	—
Acceptance Speech	Released: October 8, 2013 (US); Label: Rise; Format: Cassette, CD, digital, LP	42	14	13	7	6	—
Instant Gratification	Released: April 14, 2015 (US); Label: Rise; Format: Cassette, CD, digital, LP	32	2	2	1	2	—
Mothership	Released: October 7, 2016 (US); Label: Rise; Format: Cassette, CD, digital, LP	13	4	4	2	2	—
Artificial Selection	Released: June 8, 2018 (US); Label: Rise; Format: Cassette, CD, digital, LP	15	2	1	1	1	—
Afterburner	Released: April 24, 2020 (US); Label: Rise; Format: Cassette, CD, digital, LP	14	1	2	2	1	86
Jackpot Juicer	Released: July 29, 2022 (US); Label: Rise; Format: Cassette, CD, digital, LP	8	1	1	3	—	98
Pantheon	Released: September 12, 2025 (US); Label: Rise; Format: CD, digital, LP	145	—	—	—	—	—

=== Live albums ===
List of studio albums, with selected chart positions
Title	Album details	Peak chart positions				
Title	Album details	US	US Rock	US Alt.	US Ind.	US Hard Rock
Live At Bamboozle 2010	Released: October 18, 2010 (US); Label: Rise; Format: Digital	—	—	—	—	—
Tree City Sessions	Released: May 13, 2016 (US); Label: Rise; Format: Cassette, CD, Digital, LP	137	17	8	10	8
Tree City Sessions 2	Released: December 25, 2020 (US); Label: Rise; Format: Cassette, CD, Digital, LP	—	—	—	—	—
Tree City Sessions 3	Released: May 22, 2026 (US); Label: Rise; Format: CD, Digital, LP	—	—	—	—	—

=== Remastered albums ===
List of remastered albums
Title	Album details
Acceptance Speech 2.0	Released: August 30, 2019; Label: Rise; Formats: Digital

=== Instrumental albums ===
List of instrumental albums
Title	Album details
Artificial Selection (Instrumental)	Released: November 2, 2018 (Physical); May 31, 2019 (Digital): Label: Rise; Formats: LP, Digital
Mothership (Instrumental)	Released: June 28, 2019; Label: Rise; Formats: Digital
Instant Gratification (Instrumental)	Released: July 26, 2019; Label: Rise; Formats: Digital
Acceptance Speech (Instrumental)	Released: August 30, 2019; Label: Rise; Formats: Digital
Downtown Battle Mountain II (Instrumental)	Released: September 27, 2019; Label: Rise; Formats: Digital
Happiness (Instrumental)	Released: November 1, 2019; Label: Rise; Formats: Digital
Dance Gavin Dance (Instrumental)	Released: November 29, 2019; Label: Rise; Formats: Digital
Downtown Battle Mountain (Instrumental)	Released: December 27, 2019; Label: Rise; Formats: Digital
Afterburner (Instrumental)	Released: July 10, 2020 (Physical); December 25, 2021 (Digital): Label: Rise; Formats: CD, Digital
Jackpot Juicer (Instrumental)	Released: July 29, 2022 (Physical); December 30, 2022 (Digital): Label: Rise; Formats: CD, Digital
Tree City Sessions 3	Released: May 22, 2026; Label: Rise; Formats: LP

== Extended plays ==
List of studio albums, with selected chart positions
Title	Album details	Peak chart positions				
Title	Album details	US	US Rock	US Alt.	US Ind.	US Hard Rock
Whatever I Say Is Royal Ocean	Released: November 14, 2006 (US); Label: Rise; Format: CD, Digital, LP	—	—	—	—	—

== Singles ==
List of singles, showing year released and album name
Title	Year	Peak chart positions	Certifications	Album
Title	Year	US Hard Rock	Certifications	Album
"And I Told Them I Invented Times New Roman"	2007	—		Downtown Battle Mountain
"Lemon Meringue Tie"	2007	—		Downtown Battle Mountain
"The Backwards Pumpkin Song"	2007	—		Downtown Battle Mountain
"Open Your Eyes and Look North"	2007	—		Downtown Battle Mountain
"The Robot with Human Hair, Pt. 3"	2008	—		Dance Gavin Dance
"Alex English"	2008	—		Dance Gavin Dance
"Me and Zoloft Get Along Just Fine"	2008	—		Dance Gavin Dance
"Caviar"	2008	—		Dance Gavin Dance
"Don't Tell Dave"	2009	—		Happiness
"NASA"	2009	—		Happiness
"Tree Village"	2009	—		Happiness
"Heat Seeking Ghost of Sex"	2011	—		Downtown Battle Mountain II
"The Robot with Human Hair Pt. 2 1/2"	2011	—		Downtown Battle Mountain II
"Pounce Bounce"	2011	—		Downtown Battle Mountain II
"People You Knew / Perfect"	2011	—		Non-album single
"The Robot with Human Hair, Pt. 4"	2013	—		Acceptance Speech
"Acceptance Speech"	2013	—		Acceptance Speech
"Jesus H. Macy"	2013	—		Acceptance Speech
"Strawberry Swisher, Pt. 3"	2013	—		Acceptance Speech
"Death of the Robot with Human Hair"	2014	—		Acceptance Speech
"Pussy Vultures"	2014	—		Non-album single
"On The Run"	2015	—		Instant Gratification
"We Own the Night"	2015	—	RIAA: Gold	Instant Gratification
"Stroke God, Millionaire"	2015	—		Instant Gratification
"Eagles vs. Crows"	2015	—		Instant Gratification
"Chucky vs. the Giant Tortoise"	2016	—		Mothership
"Betrayed by the Game"	2016	—		Mothership
"Young Robot"	2016	—		Mothership
"Inspire the Liars"	2017	—		Mothership
"Summertime Gladness"	2017	—		Non-album single
"Midnight Crusade"	2018	—		Artificial Selection
"Son of Robot"	2018	—		Artificial Selection
"Care"	2018	—		Artificial Selection
"Count Bassy"	2018	—		Artificial Selection
"Hair Song"	2018	—		Artificial Selection
"Head Hunter"	2019	—		Non-album single
"Blood Wolf"	2019	—		Non-album single
"Prisoner"	2020	—		Afterburner
"Strawberry's Wake"	2020	—		Afterburner
"Lyrics Lie"	2020	—		Afterburner
"Three Wishes"	2020	—		Afterburner
"Synergy"	2022	11		Jackpot Juicer
"Pop Off!"	2022	18		Jackpot Juicer
"Die Another Day"	2022	20		Jackpot Juicer
"Cream of the Crop"	2022	19		Jackpot Juicer
"Feels Bad Man"	2022	—		Jackpot Juicer
"The Ghost of Billy Royalton"	2023	20		Non-album single
"War Machine"	2023	25		Non-album single
"Speed Demon" / "Straight From The Heart"	2024	—		Non-album single
"Midnight at McGuffy's	2025	23		Pantheon
"All the Way Down"	2025	—		Pantheon
"Trap Door"	2025	—		Pantheon
"Space Cow Initiation Ritual"	2025	—		Pantheon

== Other certified and charting songs ==
List of singles, showing year released and album name
Title	Year	Peak chart positions	Certifications	Album
Title	Year	US Hard Rock	Certifications	Album
"Uneasy Hearts Weigh the Most" (feat. Nic Newsham)	2008	—	RIAA: Gold	Dance Gavin Dance
"For the Jeers"	2022	24		Jackpot Juicer

== Other appearances ==
List of compilation and cover appearances, showing year released and album name
Title	Year	Album
"That's What I Like" (Bruno Mars cover)	2017	Punk Goes Pop Vol. 7
"Semi-Charmed Life" (Third Eye Blind cover)	2018	Songs That Saved My Life
"Story Of My Bros (Acoustic)"	2019	Punk Goes Acoustic Vol. 3

== Music videos ==
List of music videos, showing year released and director
Title	Year	Director(s)
"Me and Zoloft Get Along Just Fine"	2008	Robby Starbuck
"Tree Village"	2009	Gareth McGilvray
"Strawberry Swisher, Pt. 3"	2013	Dillon Novak
"The Death of the Robot with Human Hair"	2014	John Howe
"We Own the Night"	2015	Raul Gonzo
"Stroke God, Millionaire"	2015	John Howe
"Betrayed By The Game"	2016	Samuel Halleen
"Young Robot"	2016	John Howe
"Inspire the Liars"	2017	Samuel Halleen and John Howe
"That's What I Like"	2017	Samuel Halleen
"Summertime Gladness"	2017	Mount Emult
"Midnight Crusade"	2018	Samuel Halleen
"Care"	2018	Max Moore
"Count Bassy"	2018	Mount Emult
"Son of Robot"	2018	John Howe
"Head Hunter"	2019	Samuel Halleen
"Blood Wolf"	2019	Mount Emult
"Prisoner"	2020	Orie McGinness
"Strawberry's Wake"	2020	Samuel Halleen
"Lyrics Lie"	2020	
"Three Wishes"	2020	
"One in a Million"	2020	Rob Shaw
"Synergy"	2022	Samuel Halleen
"Pop Off!"	2022	Samuel Halleen
"Die Another Day"	2022	Samuel Halleen
"Feels Bad Man"	2022	Christian Lawrence
"War Machine"	2023	Mount Emult
"Speed Demon"/"Straight From the Heart"	2024	Matthue Cole
"Midnight at McGuffy's"	2025	Jake Woodbridge
"All the Way Down"	2025	Sam Link
"Trap Door"	2025	Matthue Cole
"Space Cow Initiation Raid"	2025	Paris Arianna
"The Stickler"	2025	Sam Link
