= Pantheon (Dance Gavin Dance album) =

Studio album by Dance Gavin Dance
- Released: September 12, 2025
- Recorded: 2023–2025
- Studio: What (Tallahassee)
- Genres: Post-hardcore; funk rock; progressive rock
- Length: 55:06
- Label: Rise
- Producers: Kris Crummett; Stephan Hawkes

Dance Gavin Dance chronology
Jackpot Juicer (2022)	Pantheon (2025)	Tree City Sessions 3 (2026)

Singles from Pantheon
- 1. "Midnight at McGuffy's" Released: May 8, 2025; 2. "All The Way Down" Released: May 22, 2025; 3. "Trap Door" Released: July 9, 2025; 4. "Space Cow Initiation Ritual" Released: August 13, 2025; 5. "The Stickler" Released: September 12, 2025

Pantheon is the eleventh studio album by American rock band Dance Gavin Dance, released on September 12, 2025, on Rise Records. Produced by Kris Crummett and Stephan Hawkes, the album serves as a follow-up to their tenth full-length studio album, Jackpot Juicer (2022), and is the band's first studio album to credit Andrew Wells as co-lead vocalist despite joining as a guitarist in 2022. It is also the band's first studio album recorded since the death of longtime bass guitarist Tim Feerick in April 2022 and the departure of vocalist Tilian Pearson in April 2024. The album features a guest appearance from American funk musician George Clinton and additional guitar work from longtime collaborator Martin Bianchini, Marc Okubo, and Sergio Medina.

To promote the album, the group announced the Return of the Robot Tour, which began in May with support from Belmont, The Home Team, and Dwellings in North America, and concluded in June. Four singles were released prior to the album's release. "Midnight at McGuffy's" was released as the lead single on May 8, 2025, followed by "All the Way Down", "Trap Door", and "Space Cow Initiation Ritual." It debuted at number 145 on the US Billboard 200, becoming their first release to not enter the top-forty on the chart since 2013's Acceptance Speech.

== Background ==
On April 14, 2022, Dance Gavin Dance had published a statement announcing the death of longtime bass guitarist Tim Feerick, who died on April 13 from an accidental fentanyl overdose. On June 1, 2022, multiple allegations of sexual misconduct and substance abuse were brought against clean vocalist Tilian Pearson which led to his dismissal from the band the same month. Pearson later returned in November 2022 before formally leaving in April 2024 due to creative differences.

In July 2022, the band released their tenth full-length studio album, Jackpot Juicer, the follow-up to their ninth studio album, Afterburner (2020), and the live album, Tree City Sessions 2 (2020). The album was supported by the Evening With Friends Tour in the US, which took place from July 26 to August 24, 2022. Originally, the band was scheduled to tour as a supporting act on American rock band Coheed and Cambria's Window of the Waking Mind Tour in the summer of 2022, however were removed due to the allegations against Pearson. During Pearson's brief return to the band, they released "The Ghost of Billy Royalton", the first of two stand-alone singles, on August 24, 2023. The second single, "War Machine", was released on October 24, 2023, before Pearson left the following year. Following Pearson's departure in April 2024, the band released the dual singles "Speed Demon" and "Straight from the Heart" on May 10, which made it their first release with guitarist Andrew Wells credited as a co-lead vocalist. Wells joined the band as a touring guitarist and backing vocalist in 2015, and had made numerous guest appearances on studio recordings, before becoming an official guitarist in 2022. In May 2024, it was revealed that Dance Gavin Dance were to support Falling in Reverse's Popular Monstour II World Domination tour in the US from August 18 to September 26, 2024, along with Black Veil Brides, Tech N9ne, Nathan James, and Jeris Johnson. This band's presence on the tour was met with mixed reception due to Falling in Reverse frontman Ronnie Radke's controversial transphobic and homophobic comments made across social media the prior year.

In October 2024, the band performed at When We Were Young 2024. In January 2025, the band announced the Return of the Robot Tour for North America, scheduled to span from May 23 to June 29, 2025 with support from Belmont, The Home Team, and Dwellings.

On May 8, 2025, the band announced the album which was accompanied with a statement:

We’re incredibly ecstatic to share our 11th full-length album, Pantheon, with the world. We poured our hearts and souls into this record – it has all the signature elements our fans have come to expect, along with fresh sounds and new styles that truly spotlight Andrew as our new vocalist. Sit back, relax, and enjoy the ride that is Pantheon.

The album's cover art was illustrated by Swedish graphic artist Mattias Adolfsson who has designed the band's album covers for every studio album since 2007's Downtown Battle Mountain.

== Promotion ==
On May 8, 2025, the band released "Midnight at McGuffy's", the lead single from the album, accompanied with its music video. A second single, "All the Way Down", was released on May 22, along with its music video.

To support the album, the band announced the Return of the Robot Tour with support from Belmont, The Home Team, and Dwellings, along with the announcement of the fourth inaugural Swanfest which will feature performances from Glassjaw, Animals as Leaders, The Fall of Troy, Left to Suffer and Kurt Travis. The tour was scheduled to take place from May 23 to June 29, 2025 in North America.

== Track listing ==
All tracks are written by William Swan, Matthew Mingus, Jonathan Mess, Andrew Wells, and Sergio Medina, except "The Conqueror Worm" (written by Swan, Mingus, Mess, and Wells).

Pantheon track listing
No.	Title	Length
1.	"Animal Surgery"	5:10
2.	"Midnight at McGuffy's"	4:10
3.	"The Robot with Human Hair: Rebirth"	5:40
4.	"The Conqueror Worm"	3:37
5.	"Trap Door"	4:22
6.	"Strawberry's Daughters"	3:35
7.	"Space Cow Initiation Ritual" (featuring George Clinton)	3:48
8.	"All the Way Down"	4:25
9.	"A Shoulder to Cry On"	4:41
10.	"The Peak of Superstition"	3:31
11.	"The Stickler"	3:59
12.	"Yikes!"	3:53
13.	"Descend to Chaos"	4:15
Total length:		55:06

== Personnel ==
Credits adapted from the album's liner notes and Tidal.

=== Dance Gavin Dance ===
- Jon Mess – unclean vocals, clean vocals (tracks 7, 9, and 13)
- Andrew Wells – clean vocals, unclean vocals, guitars
- William Swan – guitars, bass, unclean vocals, rapping vocals
- Matthew Mingus – drums

=== Additional contributors ===
- Kris Crummett – drum production, vocal production, mixing, mastering
- Stephan Hawkes – guitar production, bass production
- Sergio Medina – bass, additional musical contributions
- Marc Okubo – additional musical contributions on "The Conqueror Worm"
- Martin Bianchini – additional musical contributions on "A Shoulder to Cry On", "The Stickler", "Yikes!", and "Descend to Chaos"
- George Clinton – additional musical contributions on "Space Cow Initiation Ritual"
- Ricky Tan – engineering
- Barrence Dupree – engineering
- Mattias Adolfsson – illustrations
- Chris Rubey – coloring
- Kevin Moore – design, layout

== Charts ==
Chart performance for Pantheon
Chart (2025)	Peak position
UK Independent Albums Breakers (OCC)	16
US Billboard 200	145
US Top Rock & Alternative Albums (Billboard)	37
