= Belmont (album) =

Studio album by Belmont
- Released: August 17, 2018
- Studio: Graphic Nature Studio
- Length: 27:50
- Label: Mutant League
- Producer: Dan Korneff

Belmont chronology
Belmont (2018)	Aftermath (2022)

Singles from Belmont
- 1. "Hollowed Out" Released: June 15, 2018; 2. "Albert" Released: July 19, 2018

Professional ratings
Review scores
Source	Rating
AllMusic	4/5 stars
Pure Grain Audio	Positive
The Prelude Press	Positive
Rock 'n' Load	9/10

Belmont is the debut album by American pop punk band Belmont. The album was released on August 17, 2018, through Mutant League Records. The album charted on three Billboard charts.

== Track listing ==
No.	Title	Writer(s)	Length
1.	"Empty"	Belmont	2:31
2.	"Recluse"	Belmont	3:12
3.	"Write Me Off"	Belmont	3:37
4.	"Pushing Daisies"	Belmont	2:49
5.	"Interlude" (featuring shinigami)	Belmont	2:00
6.	"Albert"	Belmont	2:26
7.	"Hollowed Out"	Belmont	3:01
8.	"Maplewood"	Belmont	2:02
9.	"Convalescence"	Belmont	3:15
10.	"BMC"	Belmont	2:28
Total length:			27:50

== Personnel ==
Belmont

- Taz Johnson – lead vocals
- Brian Lada – drums
- Sam Patt – lead guitars, vocals
- Alex Wieringa – bass, vocals
- Jason Inguagiato – rhythm guitar

== Charts ==
Chart (2018)	Peak position
US Billboard 200	146
US Heatseekers Albums (Billboard)	2
US Top Alternative Albums (Billboard)	14
