= Tomorrow Is Nearly Yesterday and Everyday Is Stupid =

Studio album by Crywank
- Released: 7 November 2013
- Recorded: 2013
- Genre: Anti-folk; indie folk
- Length: 39:59
- Label: Self-released; Mutant League; HunkofPlastic

Crywank chronology
Narcissist on the Verge of a Nervous Breakdown (2012)	Tomorrow Is Nearly Yesterday and Everyday Is Stupid (2013)	Don't Piss on Me, I'm Already Dead (2016)

Singles from Tomorrow Is Nearly Yesterday and Everyday Is Stupid
- 1. "Memento Mori" Released: 4 September 2013; 2. "Crywank Are Posers" Released: 2 November 2013

Tomorrow Is Nearly Yesterday and Everyday Is Stupid is the third album by English anti-folk band Crywank released on 7 November 2013. It is their most commercially successful album.

== Background ==
Tomorrow Is Nearly Yesterday and Everyday Is Stupid is the third album by Crywank, composed by Jay Clayton with new member Dan Watson. In 2012, Dan Watson joined the band as a percussionist. Future touring bassist Tom Connolly assisted on a couple of tracks, credited as "cool guitar bit at the end of Notches by Tom Connolly".

== Release and promotion ==
The promotional singles were a re-release of "Memento Mori" and the release of "Crywank Are Posers" which released on 4 September 2013 and 2 November 2013, they were subsequently posted on Clayton's Tumblr blog. "Crywank Are Posers" was released as an apology for the album being delayed.

Tomorrow Is Nearly Yesterday and Everyday Is Stupid was officially released on 7 November 2013 on the band's Bandcamp page as a set-your-price purchase. The streaming version of the album, with previously released tracks added, was released on 25 September 2015.

In 2015, Crywank signed to Mutant League Records, which reissued Tomorrow Is Nearly Yesterday and Everyday Is Stupid on limited colour LP vinyl pressings in 'Wee-Wee Yellow', 'Poo-Poo Brown' and black. There are several releases due to the DIY aspect of the band, with most being self-released. This includes international pressings of LP vinyls, CDs and cassettes for tour merchandise shops.

== Reception ==
Professional ratings
Review scores
Source	Rating
Discovery Music	7.8/10

Tomorrow Is Nearly Yesterday and Everyday Is Stupid is the band’s most successful album in streaming services statistics and merchandise sales despite the lack of promotion. Due to the design of the dachshund on the album cover, it has become a common tattoo design among fans and for merchandise.

Writing for Discovery Music, Eddie Gibson explains that Tomorrow Is Nearly Yesterday And Everyday Is Stupid provides the strongest writing Clayton has shown on an album to date in imagery for torment over the heartbreak themes present on their first two albums. He speaks of how it is excepted that Crywank songs are to be sad, but this album takes it in new directions. "(...) They need Crywank to be on the verge of tears while they writes songs so they can feel the emotions in their pen. The audience doesn't ask for a phony singing uplifting songs, because that's not Crywank - they want simple, basic, sad music - and that’s exactly what Crywank delivers on their third album Tomorrow Is Nearly Yesterday And Everyday Is Stupid. (...) Tomorrow Is Nearly Yesterday And Everyday Is Stupid actually possesses Clayton's strongest song-writing yet. There's far more imagery on this album, where in the past Clayton would speak more literal."

== Track listing ==
Tomorrow Is Nearly Yesterday and Everyday Is Stupid track listing
No.	Title	Length
1.	"Memento Mori"	2:49
2.	"Song for a Guilty Sadist"	2:23
3.	"If I Were You I'd Be Throwing Up"	1:25
4.	"Notches"	3:20
5.	"Crywank Are Posers"	3:10
6.	"Obsessive Muso with No Friends"	1:17
7.	""Who Is Thomas Saunders and Why Is He Significant in Your Writings?""	1:51
8.	"Only Everyone Can Judge Me"	2:30
9.	"GB Eating GB Whilst Listening to GB"	4:18
10.	"Deep Down I'm American Werewolf"	2:05
11.	"Waste"	1:09
12.	"I Am a Familiar Creak in Your Floorboards"	1:33
13.	"Do You Have PPE for Self-Esteem?"	2:24
14.	"This Song Title Was Too Long (So Now It's Shorter)"	2:43
15.	"Leech Boy"	4:05
16.	"I Am Shit"	2:08
Total length:		39:18

Streaming bonus tracks
No.	Title	Length
17.	"I'm a Cliché"	1:35
18.	"Just a Snail"	1:16
Total length:		42:10

== Personnel ==
Adapted from Bandcamp.

- James Clayton (Note: This was album was released before Jay came out as non-binary. This article uses they/them pronouns for consistency.) – guitar, dulcimer, vocals
- Dan 'The Snail' Watson – percussion, backing vocals
- Joe 'No Relation' Clayton – recording
