= Live at Bamboozle 2010 =

Live at Bamboozle 2010 may refer to:

- Live at Bamboozle 2010 (Jonny Craig album)
- Live at Bamboozle 2010, a live album by Dance Gavin Dance
