= Crywank =

English anti-folk band

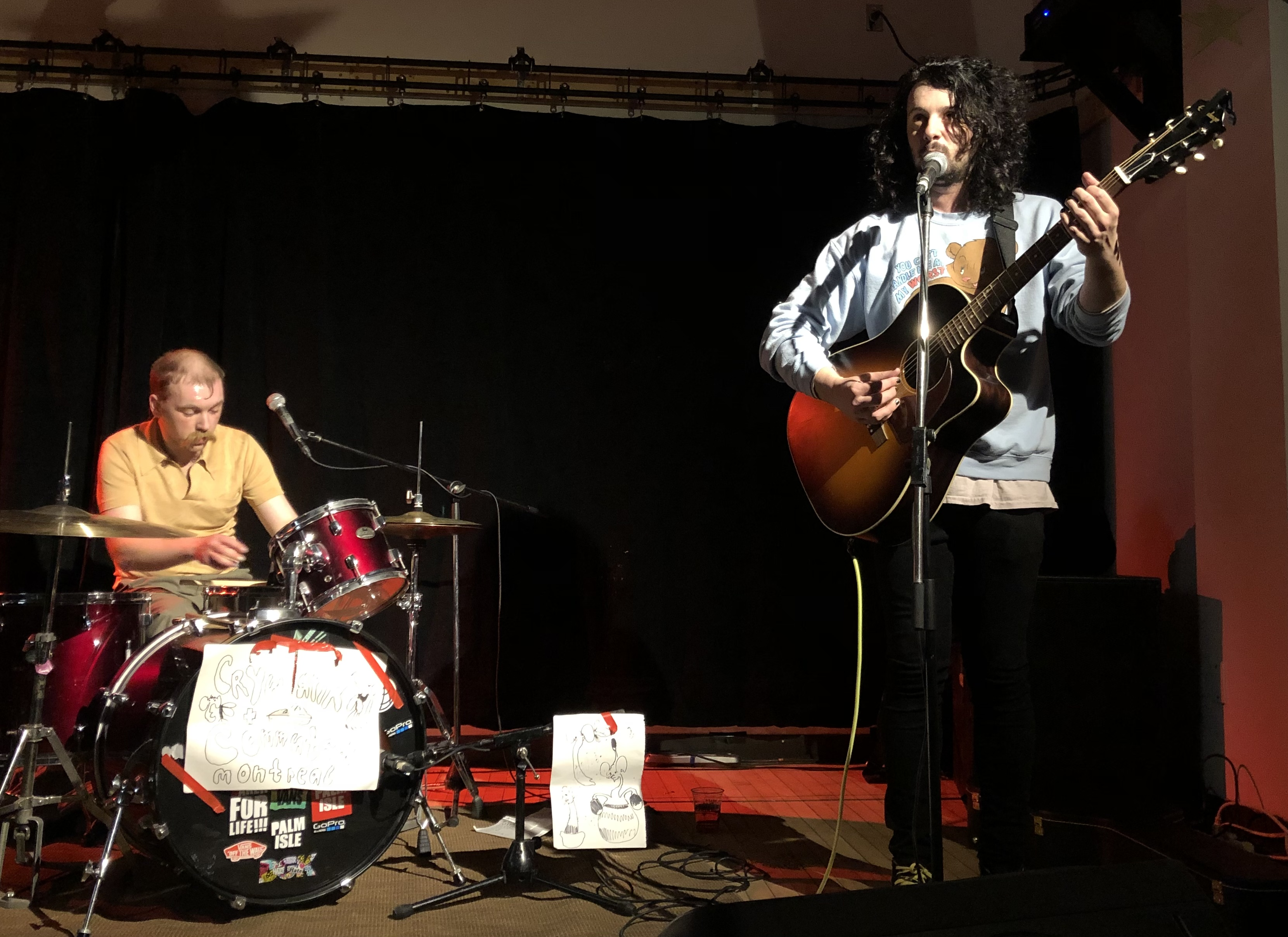
- Crywank performing live in 2022. (L–R): Dan Watson and Jay Clayton

Background information
- Origin: Manchester, England
- Genres: Anti-folk; folk punk; emo
- Years active: 2009–2020 2021-present
- Members: Jay Clayton: Daniel Watson; Jules Noel
- Past members: Tom Connolly
- Website: crywank.bandcamp.com

Crywank are an English anti-folk band based in Manchester, England. The band is a trio consisting of vocalist/guitarist and founder Jay Clayton, drummer Dan Watson, who joined in 2012 and bassist Jules Noel, who joined in 2024. AllMusic describes their body of work as containing "sadness, paranoia, misery, and dry humor", comparing them to AJJ or 'a sarcastic Bright Eyes'. The group have independently released eight full-length albums. They have previously toured the UK, Ireland, Mainland Europe, Russia, South East Asia, South America, Australia, New Zealand, US, Mexico and Canada.

== History ==
Crywank was started in 2009 by Jay Clayton. At the time, Clayton didn't know how to play guitar. They first learned two chords and wrote a few songs with said chords. After early demos were distributed online, their debut album James Is Going To Die Soon was released in September 2010, released under the Crywank pseudonym. Their second album Narcissist on the Verge of a Nervous Breakdown followed in April 2012.

Clayton enlisted drummer Dan Watson to form Crywank as a permanent band for their third full length, Tomorrow Is Nearly Yesterday and Everyday Is Stupid, which was self-released on Bandcamp in 2013.

Crywank released the tongue-in-cheek Shameless Valentines Money Grab EP in time for the holiday in 2014. A few weeks later, Clayton also released a Simpsons-inspired EP, Following the Lizard Queen, from the perspective (and under the name) of Langdon Alger, a minor character from the show.

Bassist Tom Connolly joined the band in 2015 until 2016 for their European tour with Jordaan Mason and the band's fourth LP Don't Piss on Me, I'm Already Dead which was released in 2016. According to Crywank the title was inspired by a Simpsons quote. In late 2016 Crywank did a co-headline U.K. tour with the Tuts.

In 2017 Crywank worked with Vancouver record label File Under:Music and their One Song at a Time series to produce a music video for their song Part 2. The band's fifth LP Egg on face. Foot in mouth. Wriggling Wriggling Wriggling. was released in December.

In 2019, The sixth LP entitled Wearing Beige On A Grey Day was released in March. In April, Crywank was one of the headliners at that year's Manchester Punk Festival and Hobart's HOBOFOPO Festival. They also announced that they were intending to break up after a world tour in the summer of 2020. However, due to the COVID-19 pandemic, the tour was cut short before they could tour around the US, with co-headliner Chasity.

In 2020, Crywank released their seventh album entitled Fist Me 'Til Your Hand Comes Out My Mouth on May 1. It is the only one of their albums to include drummer Dan Watson on lead vocals for various tracks on the album, and the band describes it as "probably [their] weirdest [album]". The album contains themes of "the importance of self-reflection and also of silliness", "how the band has affected [their] friendship / how [their] friendship has affected the band", and reflection upon the impact of their work.

In 2021, despite previously announcing that Fist Me 'Til Your Hand Comes Out My Mouth would be their final album, Crywank announced their eighth studio album Just Popping In to Say Hi would be released on September 13 of that same year, after Clayton was involved in a housefire earlier that month.

In March 2022 Crywank ended their hiatus and continued their postponed farewell world tour, doing shows around Canada with COMMUTED, Guard Petal and Jordaan Mason. In August 2022 Crywank and Chastity fulfilled their postponed two month co-headline tour of the US.

In May 2023, Crywank toured the United States on three headline tours with support from Absinthe Father, Foot ox and local news legend and as a supporting band with Brighton-based indie rock band Lovejoy, as well as releasing a single titled Don't Listen to This Song featuring Guard Petal. Whilst having their one year visa, Crywank managed 100 shows in the USA.

In February 2024, Clayton announced on the Crywank X page that the band was not breaking up, despite their previous farewell tour, and would be bringing in a new member, bass player Jules from Guard Petal.

Between May 3rd and May 4th 2024, Crywank attempted to set an unofficial world record for the most gigs played in different cities in 24 hours. With the intention of beating Frank Turner's attempt, they played 16 shows in 16 different cities. Music Venue Trust recognised Frank Turner as the record holder for performing 15 shows in 10 cities and 5 towns the following day in a tour organised by and in support of Music Venue Trust. Crywank's record was ineligible for official recognition by Music Venue Trust as the rules they were following were based on rules previously implemented by Guinness World Records for the same record. The Music Venue Trust publicly released their rules during Crywank’s attempt to which Crywank responded “Don’t worry babes my attempt is unofficial, if I want verification I’ll ask a punk what they think”.

== Members ==
Current members

- Jay Clayton – vocals, guitar, dulcimer, piano (2009–present)
- Daniel Watson – drums, percussion, electronics, vocals (2012–present)
- Jules Noel - backing vocals, bass (toured live 2022, joined band 2024)

Past members

- Tom Connolly – bass, guitar, backing vocals (2015-2016)

Timeline

== Discography ==
=== Albums ===
- James Is Going to Die Soon – Self release, MP3 (2010), Limited released cassettes in 2011 by Suburban Miasma Records, Mount Seldom Records, Cassette, CD, MP3 (2018)
- Narcissist on the Verge of a Nervous Breakdown – Self release, MP3 (2012) and Mount Seldom Records, Cassette, CD, MP3 (2018)
- Tomorrow Is Nearly Yesterday and Everyday Is Stupid – Self release, MP3 (2013) and Mutant League Records, 12" LP, CD, Cassette, MP3 (2015)
- Don't Piss on Me, I'm Already Dead – Self release, MP3, CD (2016)
- Egg on Face. Foot in Mouth. Wriggling Wriggling Wriggling. – Self release, MP3 (2017) and Mount Seldom Records, Cassette, MP3 (2018)
- Wearing Beige on a Grey Day – Self release, MP3, Cassette (2019)
- Fist Me 'Til Your Hand Comes Out My Mouth – Self release, MP3, 12" 2xLP (2020)
- Just Popping In to Say Hi – Self release, MP3 (2021)

=== Extended plays ===
- On the Road to a Very Bad Place – Self release, MP3 (2010)
- United By Hate (Split with the Anarchist Pizza Society) – Self release, MP3 (2012)
- Shameless Valentines Money Grab – Self release, MP3 (2014)
- I Will Freeze Time and Shit In Your Mouth (Split with Nyla) – Self release, CD (2016)
- Shameless Money Grab – Self release, MP3 (2018)
- I'll Have Some In A Bit – Self release, MP3 (2019)
- Sneck in the Nose – Bagdaddy Records, 7" (2019)

=== Singles ===
- Part 2 – Self release, MP3 (2017)
- Privately Owned Spiral Galaxy – Self release, MP3, cassette tape (Originally released on Tour Demos 2013, re-released 2022)
- Don't Listen to This Song – Self release, MP3 (2023)

=== Compilations ===
- Embarrassing Early Recordings – Self release, MP3 (2014)
- The First Two – Folk Punk Archive, MP3, CD (2020)
- Here You Go, You Do It: A Crywank Covers Compilation – Self release, MP3 (2022)

=== Demos ===
- Demo 2010 – Self release, MP3 (2010)
- James is Going To Die Soon Demos – Self release, MP3 (2010)
- Tour Demos 2013 – Self release, MP3 (2013)

=== Live albums ===
- Live at JT SOAR - Self release, MP3, 2020
- Crywank @ Alibi Lounge - Alibi Lounge, MP3, 2019
