= Secret Band =

American post-hardcore band

- Origin: Sacramento, California, U.S.
- Genres: Post-hardcore; sass; mathcore; screamo; metalcore; math rock
- Years active: 2011–present
- Labels: Rise; Blue Swan
- Spinoff of: Dance Gavin Dance
- Members: Will Swan; Matthew Mingus; Jon Mess; Jordan McCoy; Martin Bianchini
- Past members: Eric Lodge

Secret Band (often stylized as SECRETBAND) is an American post-hardcore band from Sacramento, California, formed in 2011. The band currently consists of lead vocalist Jon Mess, drummer Matthew Mingus, lead guitarist Will Swan, bass guitarist Jordan McCoy, and rhythm guitarist Martin Bianchini.

The band has been considered a side project, as all of its members have also worked with Dance Gavin Dance: Swan, Mingus, and Mess are all full-time members of Dance Gavin Dance, while Bianchini and McCoy have both worked with the group as touring members. The group was signed to Swan's independent record label Blue Swan Records until signing to Rise Records in 2019. Their self-titled debut extended play was released in 2011, with their self-titled debut studio album being released in 2014; each were properly released on June 3, 2014 and July 31, 2014, respectively. Their second studio album, LP2, was released on April 20, 2019.

== Background and formation ==
Secret Band formed in Sacramento, California between Dance Gavin Dance members Will Swan, Jon Mess, Matthew Mingus, and Eric Lodge. In an interview with The Aquarian, Swan described the band as "a little side project that I do double guitar work on and then it's just our bass player, our screamer and our drummer." He continued, "It's pretty much overall Downtown Battle Mountain II without Jonny Craig. We just decided to do just a little side project for fun." In 2013, Lodge departed from the group, leading to former Dance Gavin Dance touring bassist Jordan McCoy to pursue bass. In 2014, former The Antioch Synopsis guitarist Martin Bianchini joined the band as second guitarist.

== Band members ==
Current

- Jon Mess – vocals (2011–present)
- Will Swan – lead guitar (2011–present)
- Jordan McCoy – bass guitar (2013–present)
- Martin Bianchini – rhythm guitar (2014–present)
- Matthew Mingus – drums, percussion (2011–present)

Former

- Eric Lodge – bass guitar (2011–2013)

== Discography ==
=== Studio albums ===
- Secret Band (Blue Swan Records, 2014)
- LP2 (Rise, 2019)

=== Extended plays ===
- Secret Band (EP) (2011; re-released in 2014 via Blue Swan Records)

=== Singles ===
- "Lightning / Rabbit Hole" (Rise, 2019)
