= Icarus the Owl =

American alternative rock band

- Origin: Portland, Oregon, U.S.A.
- Genres: Post-hardcore; pop-punk; alternative rock; math rock; progressive rock; indie rock
- Years active: 2009–present (hiatus since 2018)
- Labels: Blue Swan Records; Artery Global; Interlace Audio
- Members: Joey Rubenstein; Tim Brown; Rob Bernknopf; Jake Thomas-Low
- Past members: Mike Black; Mark Haines; Ryan Warrell; Brian Fowler; Tanner Russel; AJ Stacher; Cody Doser
- Website: icarustheowl.com

Icarus the Owl is an American alternative rock band based in Portland, Oregon formed in 2009. The band currently consists of vocalist Joey Rubenstein, lead guitarist Tim Brown, percussionist Rob Bernknopf, and bassist Jake Thomas-Low. The band has self-released 5 studio albums titled The Spotless Mind (2009), Love Always, Leviathan (2012), Icarus the Owl (2014), and Pilot Waves (2015), Rearm Circuits (2017) and one EP titled Qualia (2011). The band has participated on the Vans Warped Tour in 2013 and has toured with bands such as A Lot Like Birds, Hail the Sun, Stolas, Eidola, Artifex Pereo, and The Ongoing Concept. In 2015, the band signed with Blue Swan Records and released Pilot Waves, their debut album with the label.

== Background ==
Forming with sole member, vocalist, and guitarist Joey Rubenstein, he wrote and recorded Icarus the Owl's debut studio album The Spotless Mind in early 2009 with Mark Haines on drums, with whom Rubenstein had previously played in the band Kill Your Ex. Mike Black performed bass and would later also join the band, and Dan Schafman performed additional guitars. The album was released on May 28, 2009 through Interlace Audio and was mixed and mastered by Stephan Hawkes. The band wrote and recorded their debut extended play, Qualia, in late 2010 and released it on February 1, 2011. In 2012, the band recruited Rob Bernknopf on drums and A.J. Stacher on the guitar and recorded their second full-length studio album, Love Always, Leviathan, which was released on June 21, 2012 through Interlace Audio.

Throughout 2013, the band released a string of digital singles on their official Bandcamp account being "Jaguar Shark" on March 15, "Houseboat" on April 14, and "Dead Man's Storm" on May 21. Icarus the Owl recruited Zach Mclean on bass and vocals. In 2014, the band wrote and recorded their third full-length studio album Icarus the Owl, which was released on February 4, 2014 through Interlace Audio and was produced, mixed, and mastered by Kris Crummett and Mike Sacco.

On June 30, 2015, it was announced that the band had signed to Blue Swan Records (owned by Will Swan of Dance Gavin Dance, Sianvar and Secret Band) and were recording their fourth studio album set to be released in late 2015. This album was later revealed to be called Pilot Waves and two singles were released in anticipation: "Skysweeper" (which they began touring with before the signing) and "I Am the DeLorean".

The band released the lead single 'Failed Transmissions' for their fifth studio album Rearm Circuits, which was released on December 1, 2017.

== Band members ==
Current

- Joey Rubenstein – lead vocals, guitar (2009–present)
- Rob Bernknopf – drums, percussion (2011–present)
- Tim Brown – lead guitar, vocals, keyboards (2015–present)
- Jake Thomas-Low – bass, vocals (2016–present)

Session

- Dan Schafman – guitar (2009)
- Ande Maslyk – drums (2009)
- Stephan Hawkes – bass (2011, 2013)

Former

- Tanner Russell – lead guitar, backing vocals (2009–2011)
- A.J. Stacher – lead guitar (2011–2015)
- Mike Black – bass (2009–2012)
- Ryan Warrell – bass, backing vocals (2010–2011)
- Zach Mclean – bass, vocals, keyboards (2011–2016)
- Mark Haines – drums (2009–2010, 2011)
- Brian Fowler – drums (2010–2011)

== Discography ==
Studio albums

- The Spotless Mind (2009)
- Love Always, Leviathan (2012)
- Icarus the Owl (2014)
- Pilot Waves (2015)
- Rearm Circuits (2017)

Extended plays

- Qualia (2011)

Singles

- "The Extortionist" (2009)
- "Nuclear Towns" (2012)
- "Black Fish" (2014)
- "Skysweeper" (2015)
- "I Am The Delorean" (2015)
- "Failed Transmissions" (2017)
- "Dream Shade" (2017)
