= Dance Gavin Dance (album) =

Studio album by Dance Gavin Dance
- Released: August 19, 2008
- Recorded: April–May 2008
- Genres: Post-hardcore; math rock; progressive rock; emo
- Length: 52:12
- Label: Rise
- Producer: Kris Crummett

Dance Gavin Dance chronology
| Downtown Battle Mountain (2007) | Dance Gavin Dance (2008) | Happiness (2009) |

Singles from Dance Gavin Dance
- 1. "The Robot with Human Hair, Pt. 3" Released: May 11, 2008; 2. "Alex English" Released: June 5, 2008; 3. "Me and Zoloft Get Along Just Fine" Released: June 11, 2008; 4. "Caviar" Released: August 15, 2008

Dance Gavin Dance (also known as "Death Star" due to the album cover art) is the second studio album by American rock band Dance Gavin Dance, released on August 19, 2008, on Rise Records. The album is a follow-up to the band's full-length debut studio album, Downtown Battle Mountain (2007), and is their first studio release to feature clean vocalist Kurt Travis and rhythm guitarist Zachary Garren, who replaced Jonny Craig and Sean O'Sullivan, respectively, in 2007. The album was produced, mixed, and mastered by Kris Crummett and recorded in Portland, Oregon. Following its release, the album peaked at number 172 on the Billboard 200 and 26 on the Top Independent Albums chart.

The self-titled album was supported by four singles. The lead single, "The Robot with Human Hair, Pt. 3", was released on May 11, 2008. The second single, "Alex English", named after the retired basketball player Alexander English, was released on June 5. The third single, "Me and Zoloft Get Along Just Fine", was released on June 11. "Caviar", featuring Chino Moreno of American metal band Deftones, was released as the fourth and final single on August 15, 2008. An instrumental version of Dance Gavin Dance was released on November 29, 2019.

== Track listing ==
All tracks are written by Will Swan, Kurt Travis, Jon Mess, and Matt Mingus.

| No. | Title | Length |
|---|---|---|
| 1. | "Alex English" | 4:26 |
| 2. | "Buffalo!" | 2:40 |
| 3. | "Me and Zoloft Get Along Just Fine" | 3:06 |
| 4. | "The Robot with Human Hair, Pt. 3" | 3:45 |
| 5. | "Hot Water on Wool" | 4:26 |
| 6. | "Hot Water on Wool (Reprise)" | 1:56 |
| 7. | "Uneasy Hearts Weigh the Most" (featuring Nic Newsham) | 3:38 |
| 8. | "Caviar" (featuring Chino Moreno) | 4:16 |
| 9. | "Rock Solid" (featuring Matt Geise) | 5:05 |
| 10. | "Burning Down the Nicotine Armoire, Pt. 2" | 3:31 |
| 11. | "Reprogramming Mental Preprogramming" | 3:09 |
| 12. | "Skyhook" | 2:53 |
| 13. | "People You Know" (Hidden track starting at 4:46) | 9:21 |
| Total length: | | 52:12 |

Notes

- "Hot Water on Wool (Reprise)" is a direct follow-up to the previous track "Hot Water on Wool".
- "People You Know" features a hidden track beginning at 4:46, which reprises the track "Uneasy Hearts Weigh the Most".

== Personnel ==
Dance Gavin Dance

- Kurt Travis – clean vocals
- Jon Mess – unclean vocals, backing clean vocals ("Me and Zoloft Get Along Just Fine", "Uneasy Hearts Weigh the Most")
- Will Swan – lead guitar
- Zac Garren – rhythm guitar
- Eric Lodge – bass guitar
- Matt Mingus – drums, percussion

Additional personnel

- Kris Crummett – production, engineering, mixing, and mastering
- Mattias Adolfsson – artwork
