= Happiness (Dance Gavin Dance album) =

Studio album by Dance Gavin Dance
- Released: June 9, 2009
- Recorded: February 2009
- Studios: Interlace Audio Studios, Portland, OR
- Genres: Post-hardcore; math rock; experimental rock; emo; funk rock
- Length: 36:54
- Label: Rise
- Producer: Kris Crummett

Dance Gavin Dance chronology
Dance Gavin Dance (2008)	Happiness (2009)	Downtown Battle Mountain II (2011)

Professional ratings
Review scores
Source	Rating
AllMusic	3/5 stars
Alternative Press	3.5/5 stars
Blare	3.5/5 stars
Reviewrinserepeat.com	4/5 stars

Happiness is the third studio album by American rock band Dance Gavin Dance, released on June 9, 2009, on Rise Records. It is the band's second consecutive, and final, studio album to feature Kurt Travis on clean vocals and Zachary Garren on guitar, and is their only studio album to not feature screaming vocalist Jon Mess, who left the group in 2008 before returning in 2010. It is also the band's only studio album to feature bass guitarist Jason Ellis and was for a long time their only release to feature screaming vocals from lead guitarist Will Swan. The album serves as a follow-up to the group's sophomore studio album, Dance Gavin Dance (2008) and was produced by Kris Crummett, who recorded the album with the band in Portland, Oregon at Interlace Audio Recording Studio in February 2009. Following its release, the album peaked at No. 145 on the Billboard 200 and No. 30 on the Top Independent Albums chart.

The album sees a significant departure from the group's previous traditional post-hardcore and emo sound, venturing into funk rock and experimental rock. Happiness was supported by its lead single, "Don't Tell Dave", which was released on May 28, 2009. The second single, "NASA", was released on May 31. A music video for the album's third single, "Tree Village", was released on August 15, 2009. The band toured briefly in support of the album, touring North America, Europe, and Australia. On November 1, 2019, the band released an instrumental version of the album to streaming and digital download platforms.

== Background and recording ==
Dance Gavin Dance announced that they went into the studio with Kris Crummett to record Happiness on February 14, 2009. On April 10, the group released the album artwork and a recording of the new song "Tree Village" onto their MySpace profile. On May 28, "Don't Tell Dave" was also added to their MySpace page with "NASA" being posted soon after on May 31.

== Release ==
The album was released to digital retailers and physically on June 9, 2009. Nowadays, physical releases of Happiness are scarce, with recent represses selling out in minutes. Few are available online, with a small number being found on sites such as eBay, with prices often pushing the two hundred U.S. dollar mark. However, the CD of the album is available on Rise Records' website. It is their second release thus far to provide lyrics for each song in the CD booklet (Whatever I Say Is Royal Ocean being the first).

== Track listing ==
All tracks are written by Will Swan, Kurt Travis, Matt Mingus, and Zac Garren, except where noted.

No.	Title	Writer(s)	Length
1.	"Tree Village"		3:21
2.	"NASA"		3:35
3.	"I'm Down with Brown Town"		3:01
4.	"Carl Barker"		5:13
5.	"Happiness" (featuring Tony Tataje)		3:29
6.	"Self-Trepanation"	Swan, Travis, Mingus	3:13
7.	"Strawberry Swisher, Pt. 1"		3:28
8.	"Don't Tell Dave"		3:17
9.	"Strawberry Swisher, Pt. 2"		3:06
10.	"Powder to the People"	Swan, Travis, Mingus	5:11
Total length:			36:54

== Personnel ==
Dance Gavin Dance

- Kurt Travis – clean vocals
- Will Swan – lead guitar, unclean vocals, rapping (on track 10)
- Zachary Garren – rhythm guitar
- Jason Ellis – bass
- Matt Mingus – drums, percussion

Additional personnel

- Kris Crummett – production, engineering mixing, mastering
- Neil Engle – engineering
- Jeff Bond – engineering
- Mattias Adolfsson – artwork
