= Dance Gavin Dance =

American rock band

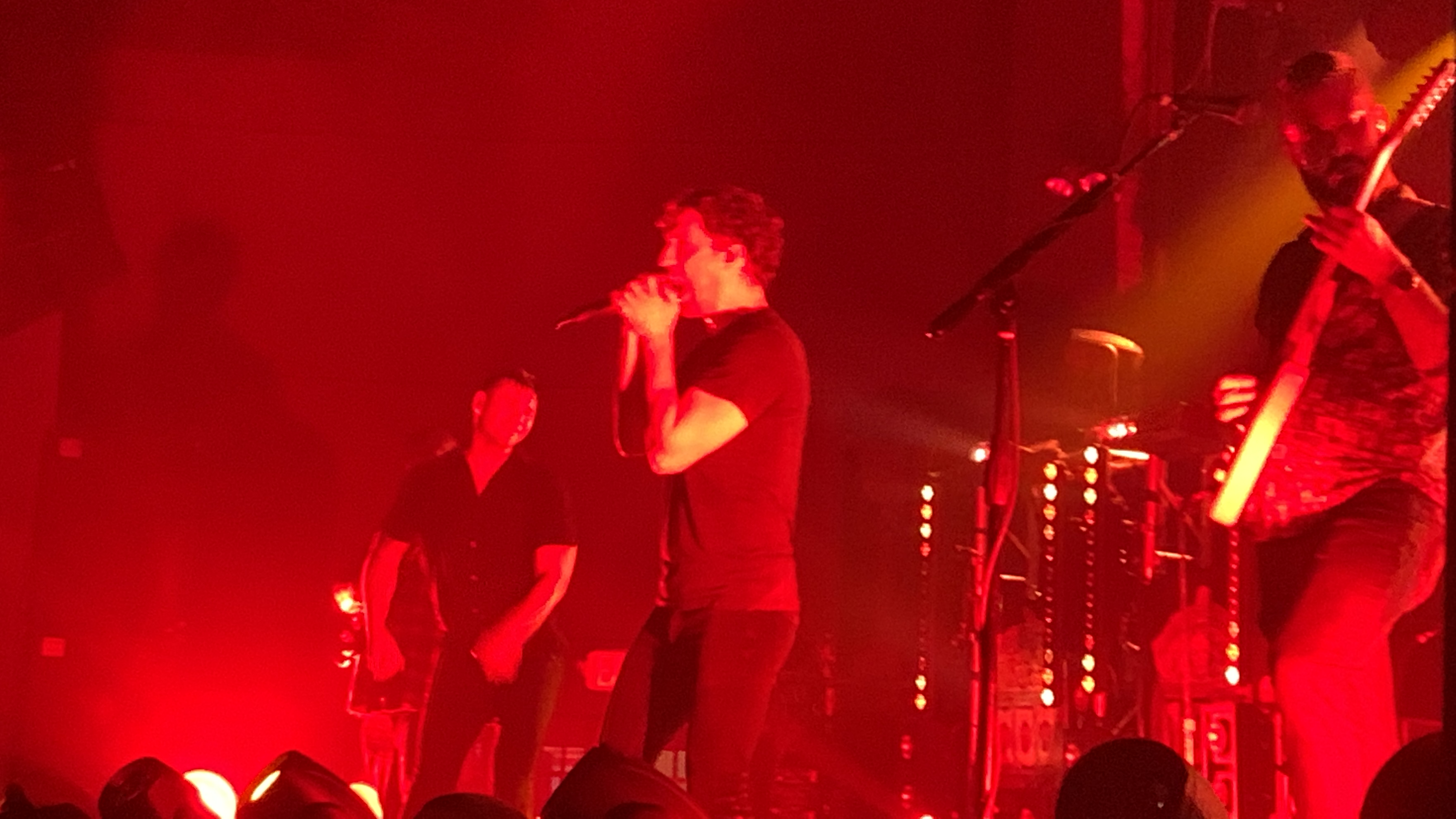
- Dance Gavin Dance performing at the Webster Theater, 2022

Background information
- Origin: Sacramento, California, U.S.
- Genres: Post-hardcore; math rock; experimental rock; progressive rock
- Years active: 2005–present
- Label: Rise
- Spinoffs: Emarosa; Isles & Glaciers; Secret Band; Sianvar; Slaves; Royal Coda
- Members: Matthew Mingus; Will Swan; Jon Mess; Andrew Wells
- Past members: Alvaro Alcala; Sean O'Sullivan; Jason Ellis; Zachary Garren; Kurt Travis; Eric Lodge; Jonny Craig; Josh Benton; Tim Feerick; Tilian Pearson

Dance Gavin Dance is an American rock band from Sacramento, California, formed in 2005. It consists of lead guitarist Will Swan, drummer Matthew Mingus, harsh vocalist Jon Mess, and lead vocalist and rhythm guitarist Andrew Wells. The band formerly included lead vocalists Jonny Craig, Kurt Travis, and Tilian Pearson, and the lineup has changed numerous times since their inception. Swan, Mingus, and Mess are the only band members who have appeared on every studio album, with the exception of one album for Mess.

The band released their debut extended play (EP), Whatever I Say Is Royal Ocean, in 2006 and signed to Rise Records thereafter. Their debut studio album, Downtown Battle Mountain, was released in May 2007. Craig and guitarist Sean O'Sullivan left the group and were replaced by Kurt Travis and Zachary Garren, respectively. They released their album, Dance Gavin Dance, in August 2008. Vocalist Jon Mess and bassist Eric Lodge left the group before the album's release, with Lodge being replaced by Jason Ellis. Happiness, the group's third studio album, was released in June 2009.

In 2010, Jonny Craig, Jon Mess and Eric Lodge returned to the band and recorded their fourth studio album, Downtown Battle Mountain II (2011). Craig and Lodge departed from the group the following year, which led to bassist Tim Feerick, guitarist Josh Benton, and former Tides of Man vocalist Tilian Pearson joining the band. They released their fifth studio album, Acceptance Speech (2013); Benton left the band shortly after the album's release. Their sixth studio album, Instant Gratification, was released in April 2015. The following year, the group released the live album, Tree City Sessions, and their seventh studio album, Mothership, the latter charting at number 13 on the Billboard 200. They released their eighth studio album, Artificial Selection, in June 2018, placing at number 15 on the Billboard 200. In 2020, they released their ninth studio album, Afterburner in April, which placed at number 14 on the Billboard 200, and Tree City Sessions 2 in December.

Bassist Tim Feerick died in 2022, prior to the release of the band's tenth album, Jackpot Juicer, leading to Sianvar and Royal Coda guitarist Sergio Medina taking over on live bass duties. Pearson underwent a brief hiatus from the band in 2022 following sexual assault allegations before parting ways with the band in 2024.

The band has achieved four top-twenty albums in the US, including one top 10.

== History ==
=== 2005–2007: Downtown Battle Mountain ===
Dance Gavin Dance formed shortly after the dissolution of guitarist Will Swan, guitarist Alvaro Alcala, drummer Matt Mingus and bassist Eric Lodge's previous band, Farewell Unknown. After recruiting harsh vocalist Jon Mess, clean vocalist Jonny Craig joined the band after leaving his former band Ghost Runner On Third due to conflicts within the group. In 2005, they self-released their debut extended play (EP), Whatever I Say Is Royal Ocean, which was subsequently re-released on November 14, 2006, on Rise Records. Their debut studio album, Downtown Battle Mountain, produced by Kris Crummett, was released on May 15, 2007, on Rise Records. The band toured with American post-hardcore groups Alesana, A Day To Remember and Pierce the Veil in support of the album.

In August 2007, guitarist Sean O'Sullivan departed from the group and was replaced by Zachary Garren. In November 2007, singer Jonny Craig had left the group due to a heated argument between himself and the band's manager and when insisting on rejoining was denied due to tensions and personal conflicts within the band, mostly due to his lack of dependability and Craig's failure to be present during a portion of the band's set at Saints & Sinners Festival in New Jersey due to alcohol and drug related issues.

=== 2008–2009: Dance Gavin Dance and Happiness ===
Briefly following Jonny Craig's departure, Dance Gavin Dance held auditions to recruit a replacement clean vocalist. Nic Newsham of American post-hardcore band Gatsby's American Dream was offered to join, however chose not to despite later featuring on the song "Uneasy Hearts Weigh The Most" on their self-titled 2008 album. Other singers that auditioned included Kellin Quinn of Sleeping with Sirens, Matt Geise of Lower Definition, and Thomas Dutton. Kurt Travis, formerly of the Sacramento based rock bands Five Minute Ride, O! The Joy, and No Not Constant, became the group's new clean vocalist.

On April 20, 2008, the group entered the studio to record their self-titled second studio album with Kris Crummett. The album was released on August 19, 2008. Prior to the release of the album, but following its recording sessions, two original members, unclean vocalist Jon Mess and bassist Eric Lodge, departed from the band. Following their respective departures, Will Swan pursued screaming vocal duties along with performing lead guitar, and Jason Ellis, formerly of Five Minute Ride, replaced Lodge on bass guitar. The group filmed a music video for the song "Me and Zoloft Get Along Just Fine", with director Robby Starbuck, which was released November 18, 2008.

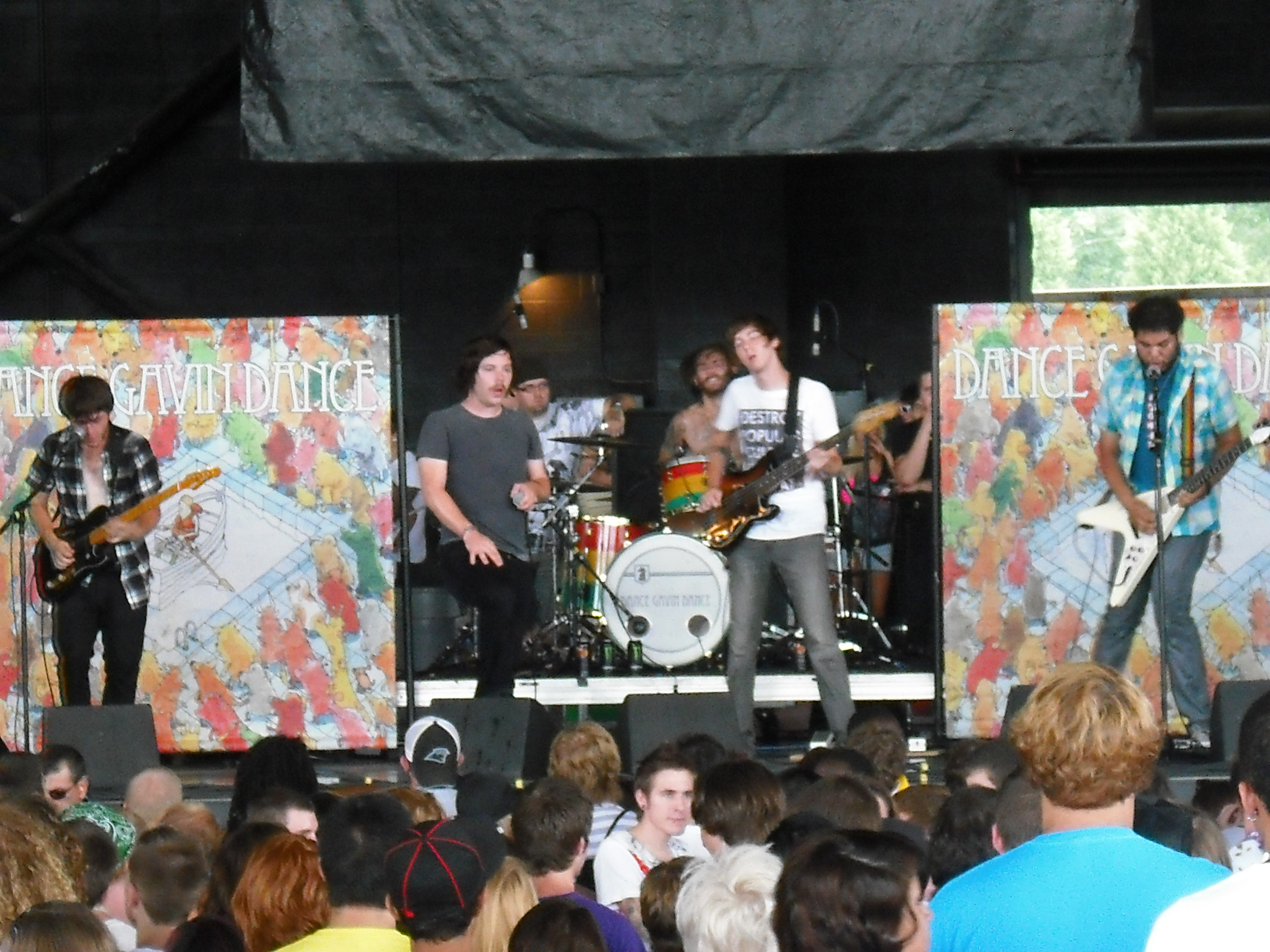
Dance Gavin Dance in 2009

In February 2009, the band went into the studio as a five-piece to record the follow-up to their self-titled album, yet again with producer Kris Crummett. The resulting album, Happiness, was released on June 9, 2009, less than one year after the release of their second studio album. Bassist Jason Ellis appears on Happiness, however left the group before its release, subsequently being replaced by Tim Feerick as a touring member. AllMusic gave a mixed review of the album, writing, "Happiness bristles with the kind of overachiever eclecticism that's as impressive as it is divisive," but that two songs were marred by the "nasally realm of high school emo," leaving the listener unsatisfied with the experience. A music video for the track "Tree Village" was released shortly after the album. The band embarked on tours with American rock bands Emarosa, Closure in Moscow, Scary Kids Scaring Kids, and others in support of the album.

On February 10, 2010, guitarist Zachary Garren was allegedly ousted by the band due to personal conflicts with other members. Shortly after, Garren met drummer Ben Rosett and formed the math rock trio Strawberry Girls, now signed to Tragic Hero Records. Dance Gavin Dance played the Soundwave festival as scheduled as a four-piece with Swan handling all guitar duties and Kurt Travis playing keyboards.

=== 2010–2012: Downtown Battle Mountain II ===
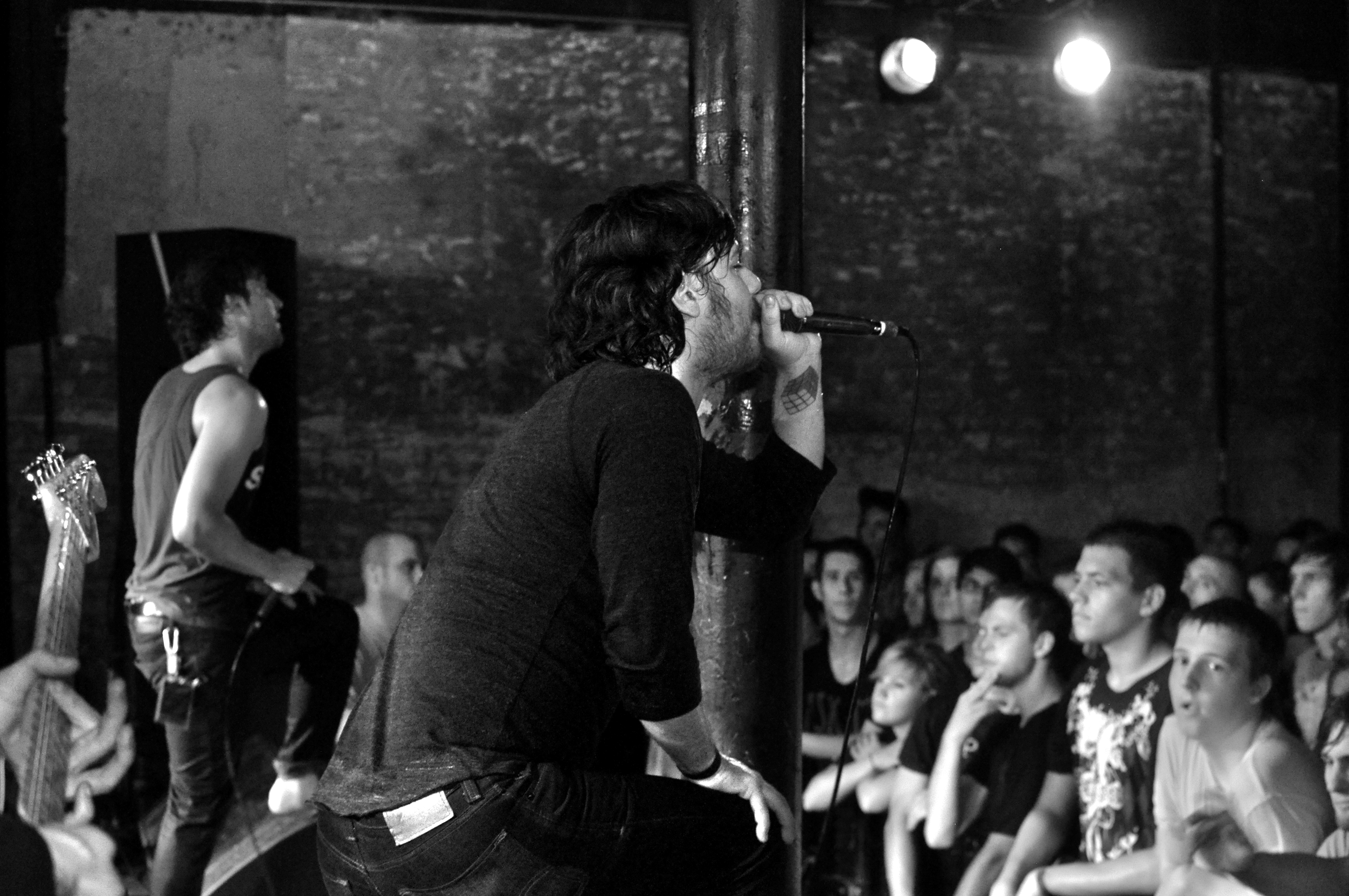
Dance Gavin Dance performing for the Scream It Like You Mean It tour in 2010.

Jon Mess and Eric Lodge rejoined the band in mid-2010. Josh Benton, former guitarist and bandmate of Kurt Travis in No Not Constant, took up guitar duties. In August Alternative Press said singer Kurt Travis and Dance Gavin Dance had officially parted ways in order for Jonny Craig to rejoin the band. Before dismissing Travis, the band briefly considered recording an album with Travis and Mess on vocals with producer Matt Bayles at the helm. Mess stated in an interview with noisey.vice.com that if Jonny wasn't willing to rejoin, the band would've broken up. Former guitarist Sean O'Sullivan rejoined the band for several home shows towards the end of 2010, returning the band to their Downtown Battle Mountain line-up. On March 8, 2011, the band released Downtown Battle Mountain II.

In March 2011, the band began their U.S. tour with Iwrestledabearonce, In Fear And Faith, and Just Like Vinyl, followed by a small European tour, culminating in two shows in London playing the original Downtown Battle Mountain in full on the first night and Downtown Battle Mountain II in full on the second night. The band also played at the 2011 Vans Warped Tour. In an April 2011 interview with Mind Equals Blown, drummer Matt Mingus stated the band plans to release another album with the current, reunited lineup. On August 20, 2012, Jonny Craig announced his departure from the band.

=== 2013–2014: Acceptance Speech ===
On August 21, 2012, Dance Gavin Dance announced Craig's departure via Facebook.

Tilian Pearson, formerly of Tides of Man, was asked to replace Craig as clean vocalist during the making of his solo album, Material Me (2013). Pearson, along with guitarist Josh Benton and bass guitarist Tim Feerick, were confirmed as official members by Jon Mess. The band's fifth album, Acceptance Speech, was released on October 8, 2013, with Rise Records. The album was produced by Matt Malpass. Shortly after the shooting of their music video for their single "Strawberry Swisher Pt. 3", Josh Benton parted ways with the band in order to focus on his career as an audio engineer and producer. Aric Garcia of post-hardcore band Hail the Sun replaced Benton for The Acceptance Speech Tour and The Rise Records tour. On September 17, Dance Gavin Dance released a b-side from Acceptance Speech, entitled "Pussy Vultures".

=== 2014–2015: Instant Gratification and 10 year anniversary ===
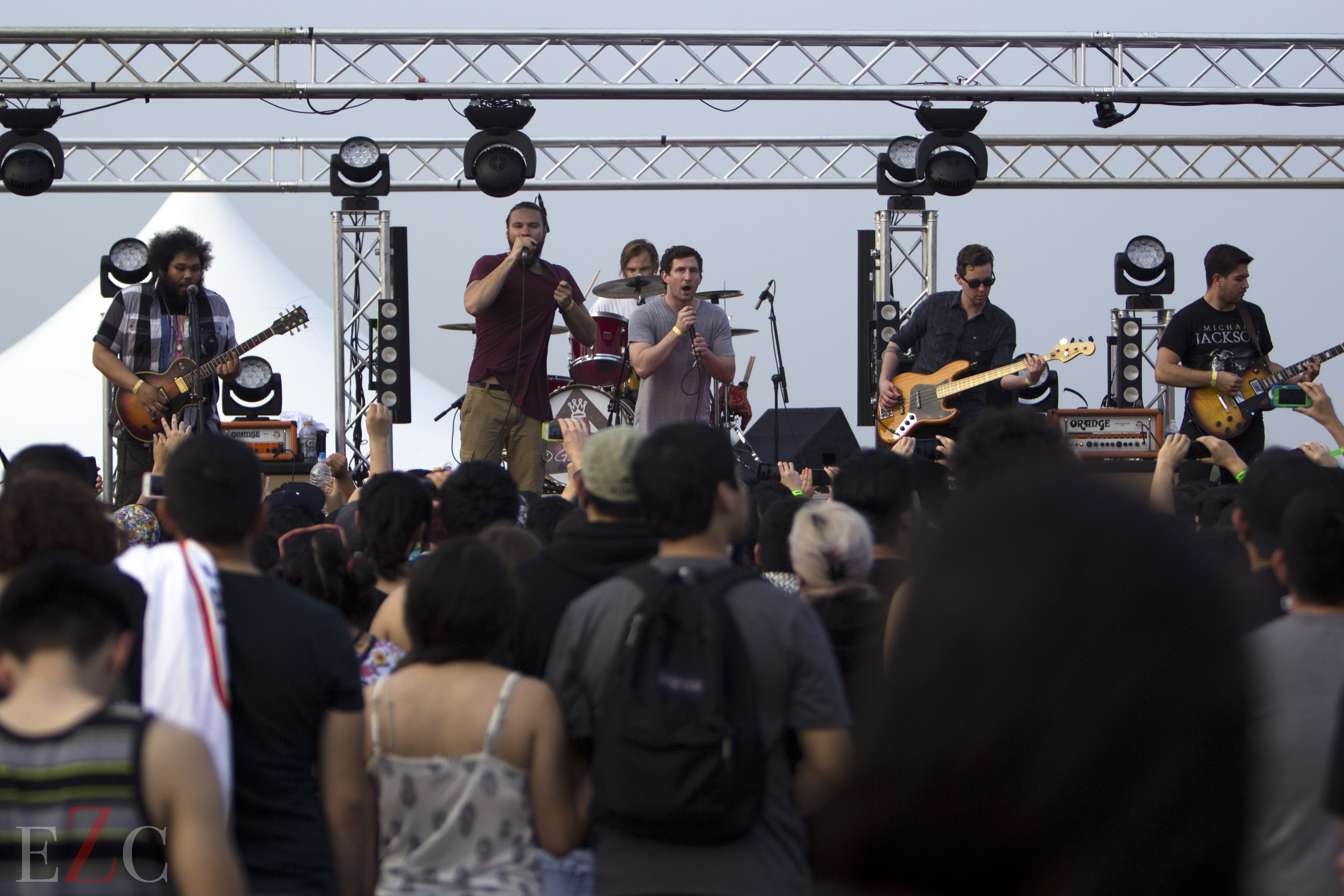
Dance Gavin Dance performing at Never Say Never Festival 2015.

On October 29, 2014, producer Kris Crummett announced that recording sessions for the band's sixth studio album were completed. In place of former member Josh Benton, Strawberry Girls and former Dance Gavin Dance guitarist Zachary Garren, Secret Band guitarist Martin Bianchini, and Hail the Sun guitarist and touring member Aric Garcia contributed their respective guitar parts on the album. On February 6, 2015, Rise Records released a teaser for the new album Instant Gratification, which was later released on April 14, 2015. On February 12, 2015, the band released the lead single, "On the Run". The second single, "We Own the Night", was released on March 12, 2015. The music video for "We Own the Night" was uploaded to the official Rise Records YouTube channel on May 7, 2015. On April 2, the band premiered the music video for the song "Stroke God, Millionaire".

On February 19, 2015, the band's guitarist Will Swan published a post on Facebook revealing that the guitar pedalboard he uses to perform live with Secret Band, Dance Gavin Dance, and Sianvar was stolen at a show of February 14 on The Blue Swan Tour. He launched a GoFundMe account and asked fans to donate $2,500 to help purchase a replacement pedalboard. The fund reached its goal within three hours of its launch.

Dance Gavin Dance toured as a supporting act on the Take Action! Tour with Memphis May Fire, Crown The Empire, and Palisades from March 10 to April 4, 2015. In support of Instant Gratification, the band announced the Instant Gratification Tour, which took place from April 14 to May 8, 2015, across North America with supporting acts Polyphia, Hail The Sun, and Stolas. The band embarked on their headlining Australia tour from May 14 to 23, 2015, with opening acts Acrasia. In celebration of the band's 10th anniversary, Dance Gavin Dance embarked on the 10 Year Anniversary tour with supporting acts A Lot Like Birds, Slaves, Dayshell, and Strawberry Girls from November 14 to December 19, 2015, in North America.

=== 2016–2017: Tree City Sessions and Mothership ===
On December 23, 2015, Rise Records revealed that Dance Gavin Dance were to release their upcoming seventh studio album the fall of 2016.

The band performed at So What Music Festival in Grand Prairie, Texas on March 20, 2016. They also performed at the Extreme Thing Sports & Music Festival in Las Vegas, Nevada on April 2, 2016, with other bands such as Saosin, the Story So Far, the Maine, Mayday Parade, among several others.

On March 2, 2016, the band announced their live studio album, Tree City Sessions, which was released on May 13, 2016. The album contains 12 live recorded songs performed in Sacramento, California at the Pus Cavern Studios. On May 10, 2016, the band announced the U.K. leg of their 10th anniversary tour that included vocalists Tilian Pearson, Kurt Travis, and Jonny Craig. On July 11, the group announced their U.S. fall tour which took place from September 22 to October 27, 2016.

On July 27, 2016, the band announced their seventh studio album, Mothership, with a scheduled release date of October 7, 2016. The lead single, "Chucky Vs. the Giant Tortoise", was released on August 18, 2016. The music video for "Betrayed By The Game" was released on September 16, 2016, and the music video for "Young Robot" was released on September 27, 2016. In support of the album, the band embarked on The Mothership Tour with supporting acts The Contortionist, Hail the Sun, Good Tiger, and The White Noise, which took place from September 22 to October 27, 2016.

Dance Gavin Dance embarked on the European leg of their 10-year anniversary tour from November 3 to 26, 2016. The band embarked on a tour with American rock bands CHON and Eidola in February and March, entitled The Robot with Human Hair Vs. Chonzilla Tour.

On June 1, 2017, the band released a studio cover of the Bruno Mars single "That's What I Like" on YouTube. On June 15, 2017, they released the stand-alone single "Summertime Gladness". The group toured on the Journey's Right Foot Stage on the Vans Warped Tour from June to August.

On October 4, 2017, the band announced a U.S. tour, consisting of the group performing their seventh studio album Mothership in its entirety through December, with support from Polyphia, Icarus the Owl, and Wolf & Bear.

=== 2018–2020: Artificial Selection, Afterburner and Tree City Sessions 2 ===
On October 17, 2017, the band announced that recording of their upcoming eighth studio album had begun and that the album should expect a release date of summer 2018. The band embarked on a headlining European tour from March 3 to 22, 2018, with Veil Of Maya and Thousand Below as support. The band announced their eighth studio album, Artificial Selection, on March 23, 2018. The band released the lead single off the album, "Midnight Crusade", on April 4, 2018, accompanied with its music video. On May 3, 2018, the band released the song "Son of Robot". They released the song "Care", accompanied by a music video, on May 24, 2018. "Count Bassy" and its music video were released three days prior to the album on June 5, 2018. In support of the album, the band supported American post-hardcore band Underoath on two 2018 tours and embarked on their headlining Artificial Selection Tour, with Periphery, Hail the Sun, and Don Broco, in 2019. The band held their first annual SwanFest on March 30, 2019, at the City National Grove of Anaheim in Anaheim, California.

A new single, "Head Hunter", was released on March 22, 2019. The band's clean vocalist Tilian Pearson confirmed that Dance Gavin Dance will release their ninth studio album in 2020, with new singles coming out in 2019.

On August 30, 2019, the band released Acceptance Speech 2.0, a remaster of their fifth studio album Acceptance Speech.

Another single, "Blood Wolf", was released on October 11, 2019. It became the band's first career charting single, debuting at number 24 on the Billboard Hot Rock Songs chart. A spring tour was announced on November 12, scheduled to take place from March 12 to April 25, 2020, with support from Animals As Leaders, Veil of Maya, Royal Coda, and a yet to be announced "mystery band". On December 12, 2019, frontman Tilian Pearson revealed Issues would be joining as the “mystery band,” giving them the seal of approval by saying he's “been a fan for a while now.” On March 12, 2020, the band announced that they had cancelled all tour dates on the 2020 spring tour due to the COVID-19 pandemic with plans to reschedule. On March 24, the band announced the rescheduled tour dates under the name The Afterburner Tour. They were scheduled to take place in August and September 2020, but were eventually cancelled due to the COVID-19 pandemic.

On February 21, 2020, the band announced that their ninth studio album, Afterburner, would be released on April 24, 2020. The lead single, "Prisoner", was released on the same day along with its music video. Another single, "Strawberry's Wake", was released on March 12, 2020, along with its music video. The music video for the single "Lyrics Lie" was released on April 9, 2020. The single "Three Wishes" was released on April 16, 2020, along with its music video. The video features fan submissions based on the theme of "clean".

On December 25, 2020, the band released their second live album Tree City Sessions 2.

=== 2021–2022: Jackpot Juicer, Tim Feerick's death, and Tilian Pearson's hiatus ===
On February 26, 2021, guitarist Will Swan confirmed that the band were writing their tenth studio album and are scheduled to begin recording in the summer. On October 16, Tilian announced that Eidola vocalist Andrew Wells will be the band's newest member. The band ended 2021 with the Afterburner tour with support from Polyphia, Veil of Maya, Eidola, and Wolf & Bear. It was one of the first large scale indoor venue tours since the COVID-19 pandemic and sold a total of 78,565 tickets and 28 of the 33 shows were sold out.

On March 24, 2022, the band released "Synergy", featuring Rob Damiani of English rock band Don Broco, as the lead single from their tenth studio album, Jackpot Juicer. Early reviews for the album were very positive, with BoolinTunes referring to it as the band's 'most electrifying, consistent and varied release.' In support of the album, the band performed at their second inaugural SwanFest at Heart Health Park in Sacramento, California on April 23, 2022, which was followed by a spring tour with support from Memphis May Fire, Volumes, and Moon Tooth in April and May. The band was slated as support on Coheed & Cambria's A Window of the Waking Mind tour in North America in July and August 2022, followed by a headlining tour in the UK and Europe with support from Caskets, Volumes, and Eidola. On June 8, they were dropped from the Coheed & Cambria tour.

On April 14, 2022, the band released a statement announcing that bassist Tim Feerick had died the night before. Feerick's cause of death was later reported to be a suspected fentanyl overdose. He was 34 years old.

On June 3, 2022, following sexual assault allegations against Tilian Pearson, the band released a statement announcing that Pearson would take a hiatus from the band.

On June 27, 2022, the band announced their An Evening With Friends tour in support of their album Jackpot Juicer. The 21-date North American stretch of live shows excluded vocalist Tilian Pearson, with Andrew Wells and former frontman Kurt Travis sharing clean vocal duties instead.

On November 10, 2022, Dance Gavin Dance announced via social media that Pearson had rejoined the band from his hiatus. In his own statement, Pearson additionally denied the accusations previously brought against him.

=== 2023–2024: Jackpot Juicer Tour, New singles, and Pearson's Departure ===
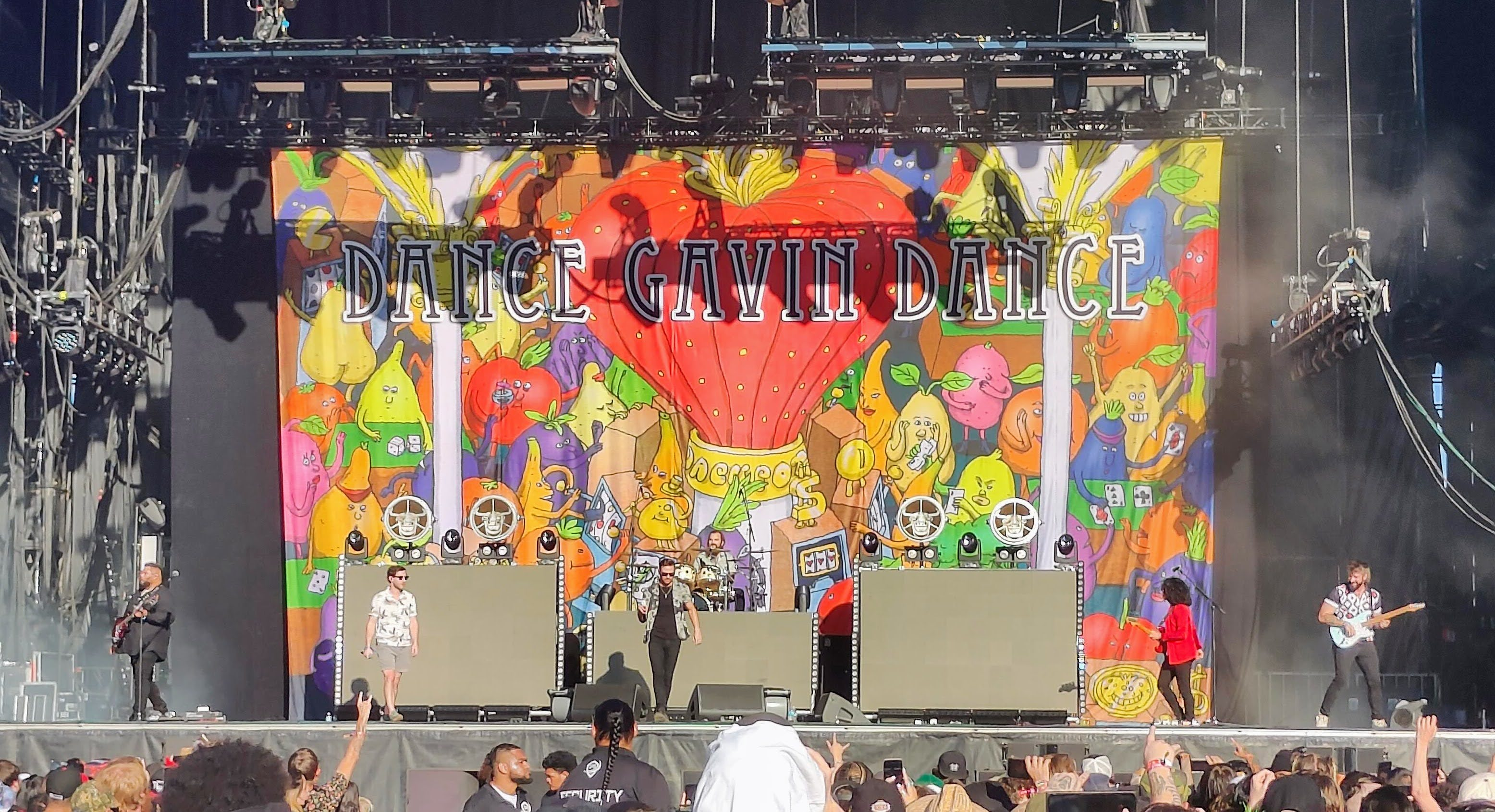
Dance Gavin Dance performing at Aftershock 2023.

On May 16, 2023, the band announced The Jackpot Juicer Tour with support from SiM, Rain City Drive, and Within Destruction as well as Swanfest 2023 taking place in Philadelphia, PA with Stolas, Dwellings, Periphery, Body Thief, Saosin, and Set It Off also joining the festival. On August 24, 2023, the band released a new song called “The Ghost of Billy Royalton” as well as a music video made by guitarist Will Swan for the late Tim Feerick. Sergio Medina was credited for bass in this single. Exactly 2 months later, the band released another new song called "War Machine" as well as a music video directed by Mount Emult.

On April 15, 2024, the band announced the departure of clean vocalist Tilian Pearson via Instagram, citing creative differences and their goals no longer aligning as the reason. Pearson also announced his departure via an announcement on his personal Instagram page.

=== 2024-present: Andrew Wells era, Pantheon ===
On May 10, 2024, the band released two singles, "Speed Demon" and "Straight From the Heart" alongside a music video for both. The two singles were their first to feature Andrew Wells as full-time clean vocalist. Later that year, they embarked on the Popular MonsTOUR II tour with Falling in Reverse, joined by Secret Band guitarist Martin Bianchini in Andrew's place on guitar.

On January 14, 2025, the band announced their first headlining tour since Tilian's departure, the Return of the Robot tour, with The Home Team, SeeYouSpaceCowboy, and Dwellings. SeeYouSpaceCowboy dropped off the tour shortly after the announcement and were replaced by Belmont.

On May 8, 2025, the band announced their next full-length album, Pantheon, alongside the release of the single "Midnight at McGuffy's". A second single, entitled "All The Way Down", released on May 22, 2025. Two additional singles, "Trap Door" and "Space Cow Initiation Ritual", released on July 9, 2025, and August 13, 2025. Pantheon released on September 12, 2025, marking their longest gap between albums to date. The album was their first full-length to feature Andrew Wells as the lead clean vocalist.

In February 2026, the band was announced as part of the lineup for the Louder Than Life music festival in Louisville, scheduled to take place in September. The band will also make an appearance on the 2026 Vans Warped Tour. They will also tour with Novelists, The Fall of Troy, Horse the Band and Wolf & Bear from May to early July.

On May 22, 2026, Tree City Sessions 3 was released on all digital platforms, with the physical release on June 19.

== Musical style, influences, and side-projects ==
Dance Gavin Dance's musical style has been described as post-hardcore, math rock, experimental rock, emo, progressive rock, screamo, and jazz fusion. Critics have compared the band to fellow post-hardcore peers the Fall of Troy, Alexisonfire and Circa Survive. Their 2011 release Downtown Battle Mountain II is said to feature “the same structuring as The Mars Volta album The Bedlam In Goliath in that it never lets up”.

When asked about their influences in a 2007 interview, Jon Mess said, "We all have such varied music taste that it would be quite a long list," and mentioned At the Drive-In, Cursive, Explosions in the Sky, MF Doom and Radiohead. Other influences include Deftones, The Temptations, Glassjaw, Usher and Earth, Wind & Fire. Matt Mingus cited Genesis's Phil Collins and Deftones's Abe Cunningham as two of his favorite drummers, while Will Swan called the guitar work of Thursday and At the Drive-In's Omar Rodríguez-López as major influences. Swan has emphasized the band's interest in incorporating new styles and to experiment on every release.

Former vocalist Jonny Craig was most recently the frontman of Slaves from 2014 until his departure in 2019. Former vocalist Kurt Travis handled vocal duties for the band, A Lot Like Birds, from 2011 until 2016, and is currently the vocalist in Royal Coda, whereas former guitarist Zachary Garren has started his band Strawberry Girls, and lead guitarist Will Swan currently operates his own record label, Blue Swan Records, and pursues guitar in the bands Royal Coda (Who features former vocalist Kurt Travis and bassist Sergio Medina), as well as Secret Band (Who features drummer Matthew Mingus and vocalist Jon Mess), and was formerly a guitarist in the now defunct supergroup Sianvar. Former guitarist Josh Benton also works as a record producer and has produced Dance Gavin Dance's live studio album, Tree City Sessions (2016), as well as a majority of the releases on Blue Swan Records.

== Band members ==
Current members

- Will Swan – lead guitar, backing vocals (2005–present), rap vocals (2009–present), unclean vocals (2008–2010, 2025–present)
- Matt Mingus – drums, percussion (2005–present)
- Jon Mess – unclean vocals (2005–2008, 2010–present; touring 2009–2010), additional clean vocals (2025–present)
- Andrew Wells – rhythm guitar, clean vocals (2021–present; session/touring 2015–2021), lead vocals (2022, 2024–present)

Touring and session members

- Sergio Medina – bass, additional guitar (session 2020–present; touring 2021, 2022–present)
- Martin Bianchini – guitar (session 2015–present; touring 2024–present)

== Discography ==
- Downtown Battle Mountain (2007)
- Dance Gavin Dance (2008)
- Happiness (2009)
- Downtown Battle Mountain II (2011)
- Acceptance Speech (2013)
- Instant Gratification (2015)
- Mothership (2016)
- Artificial Selection (2018)
- Afterburner (2020)
- Jackpot Juicer (2022)
- Pantheon (2025)
