= Lower Definition =

American post-hardcore band

- Origin: San Diego, California
- Genres: Post-hardcore; experimental rock
- Years active: 2002–2011, 2020–present
- Label: Ferret
- Members: Eddy Marshburn; Valentino Arteaga; Matt Geise; Stefan Toler; Mark Luciano
- Past members: Willie Caldwell; Korey Severson; Jordan Wark; Michael McCullough; Forrest Holland; Esteban Baena
- Website: facebook.com/lowerd10year

Lower Definition is an American post-hardcore band from San Diego, California, United States, formed in 2002. The band released two studio albums and six EPs before disbanding in 2009. After that they released an EP in 2011 called 'The Infinite Et Cetera'. In 2020 the band reunited and has since released six songs.

== History ==
=== 2002-2009 ===
Lower Definition was formed in 2002 by Eddy Marshburn and Valentino Arteaga. Marshburn's sister introduced the two and they began rehearsing, soon connecting with other musicians. The band started out playing in the all-ages scene of San Diego.

The band, still unsigned, won a slot on the Taste of Chaos tour at the San Diego Sports Arena in 2006 resulting from a contest held by MySpace. Their demo song "Higher Than Kites" features Vic Fuentes of Pierce The Veil. At Mira Mesa's Epicentre a month later, lead singer Jordan Wark surprised fans and his four bandmates when he announced onstage that he'd be leaving the band. Matt Geise came from the band The Red Sky to replace Wark on vocals. In 2007, they independently released their debut album, Moths featuring Geise for the first time as their vocalist on an any recording.

In 2008, they released The Greatest of All Lost Arts on Ferret Records, featuring guest vocals from Jonny Craig. The band went on the Party Star Tour with Dance Gavin Dance and A Static Lullaby to promote its release. Arteaga and bassist Stefan Toler quit the band in February, 2009 causing the band to suffer their first hiatus.

=== 2009-2011 ===
The band re-formed when Matt Geise and Eddy Marshburn put together a new lineup in late 2009 with Willie Caldwell, Korey Severson, and Michael McCullough. The band started recording with Chad Ackerman (formerly of Destroy the Runner) and posted demos to their Myspace. Since the band's reformation they went on the No Bummer Summer Tour with Gwen Stacy and the Mac N Dank Tour with Conditions. They also toured with Jamie's Elsewhere. They finished recording their new EP entitled "The Infinite Et Cetera", available at their bandcamp website.

Matt Geise has said from several of his Twitter updates that he was no longer lead singer for the band. Since then, Lower Definition has gone in a state of Inactivity. In 2016, Geise released a 3-song EP under the moniker Low End Talk.

=== 2018-Present: 10 Year Reunion Show and New Album ===
In October 2018, after an extended period of inactivity, the band announced a reunion show in honor of the ten year anniversary of their album The Greatest of All Lost Arts. Initially slated to perform the side stage at San Diego's SOMA venue on December 14, rapid ticket sales quickly escalated them to the main stage. Shortly after, they announced the show would be supported by Night Verses and Dead American. The current lineup for the reunion show features Matt Geise, Eddy Marshburn, Valentino Arteaga, Stefan Toler, and Mark Luciano. In 2020 Lower Definition got back together and is working on a new album which will be released 2021. On April 2 the band released a single from their upcoming album entitled "Grief Eater".

== Band members ==
Current lineup

- Matt Geise – lead vocals (2007–2011, 2020–present)
- Eddy Marshburn – lead guitar (2002–2011, 2020–present)
- Stefan Toler – bass (2002–2009, 2020–present)
- Valentino Arteaga – drums (2002–2009, 2020–present)
- Mark Luciano - rhythm guitar (2004-2008, 2020–present)

Former members

- Esteban Baena – vocals (2002–2004)
- Jordan Wark – vocals (2005–2007)
- Willie Caldwell – rhythm guitar (2009–2011)
- Michael McCullough – bass (2009–2011)
- Forrest Holland – drums (2003–2004)
- Korey Severson – drums (2009–2011)

== Discography ==
=== Studio albums ===
- Moths (Self-released, 2007)
- The Greatest of All Lost Arts (Ferret Records, July 8, 2008)
- The Purpose of the Moon (Self-released, January 9, 2026)

=== EPs & Demos ===
- Upon Fallen Ashes (Self-released, 2003)
- Early 2004 Demo (Self-released, 2004)
- Winter Tour 2004–2005 Sample (Self-released, 2004–2005)
- Rough EP (Self-released, 2005)
- Demo 2005 (Self-released, 2005)
- Fall 2006 Demo (Self-released, 2006)*
- The Infinite Et Cetera (Self-released, 2011)

=== Non-album singles ===
- Grief Eater (Self-released, 2021)
- Talk About It (Self-released, 2021)
- Close The Door (Self-released, 2022)
- F G R B (Self-released, 2022)
