= Belmont (band) =

American rock band

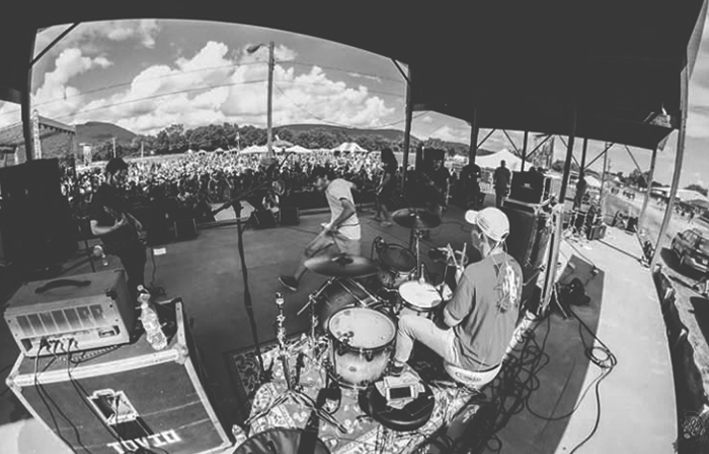
- Belmont in live show.

Background information
- Origin: Chicago, Illinois
- Genres: Pop punk; prog punk
- Years active: 2014–present
- Labels: Mutant League; Pure Noise
- Members: Taz Johnson; Brian Lada; Jason Inguagiato
- Past members: Matt Fusi; Joey Legittino; Amal Sheth; Sam Patt; Thomas Hollingsworth; Alex Wieringa
- Website: belmontil.com

Belmont is an American rock band from Chicago, Illinois.

== History ==
The band first formed in 2014 while band members were still in high school. The band was formed by frontman and lead vocalist Taz Johnson, and after a series of early lineup changes, stabilized with guitarist Sam Patt, bassist Alex Wieringa, and drummer Brian Lada. Belmont self-released their debut EP titled Vicissitude which was produced by Mat Kerekes of Citizen and his brother. In 2016, after solidifying their lineup, Belmont announced their signing to Mutant League Records and released the EP Between You & Me. In 2017, Belmont released a music video for a new single "Step Aside".

The band released their debut studio album, Belmont in August 2018. Music videos were released for the singles "Hollowed Out" and "Hideout". The band toured heavily in support of the release; in 2019, they toured with Senses Fail and The Amity Affliction. In early 2020, the band embarked on a North American tour with Sleeping with Sirens, Set It Off, and Point North. The band started a tour with Tiny Moving Parts, but a few dates into it, had to cancel it due to the outbreak of the COVID-19 pandemic. Once it became clear that it was not a short-term issue, the band instead turned to focus on writing and recording a second studio album instead. Their second studio album, Aftermath, was released in 2022, and the band returned to touring in support of it at the same time.

A third studio album, Liminal, was released on April 12, 2024. Johnson said of writing Liminal:

With the title Liminal, it was a weird time in my life when I was writing this, and I was going through a lot of changes as everyone does. I was out of a really long relationship; my mother was going through cancer, and I was dealing with moving across the country. There were a lot of moving pieces to my life at that point. The definition of liminal is transitional periods and transitional spaces. Lyrically, it matches this phase of my life from positives to negatives and it’s just riding that wave between them."

The track "All Bite" was released as a single from the album.

== Musical style and influences ==
The band has been described as pop punk and prog punk.

== Band members ==
Current

- Taz Johnson – lead vocals (2014–present)
- Brian Lada – drums, guitars, bass (2014–present) ; programming (2019–present)
- Jason Inguagiato – lead guitar (2018–present); rhythm guitar (2017–2018)

Former

- Amal Sheth – lead guitar, backing vocals (2014-2015)
- Joey Legittino – bass (2014–2015); backing vocals (2014–2016)
- Sam Patt – rhythm guitar (2014–2015); lead guitar (2014, 2015–2020)
- Matt Fusi – lead guitar (2015)
- Alex Wieringa – bass, backing vocals (2015–2022)

Timeline

== Discography ==
Studio albums

Year	Title	Label	Chart positions		
Year	Title	Label	Top 200	US Indie	US Heat
2018	Belmont	Mutant League	146	16	2
2022	Aftermath	Pure Noise	—	—	—
2024	Liminal	Pure Noise	—	—	—

EPs

- Vicissitude (2015, Self-Released)
- Between You & Me (2016, Mutant League)
- Water Weight / Step Aside 7" (2017, Mutant League)
- Reflections (2020, Pure Noise)
- Bowser's Mixtape (2021, Pure Noise)
- Last To Love (2025, Pure Noise)
