= Mutant League Records =

American independent record label

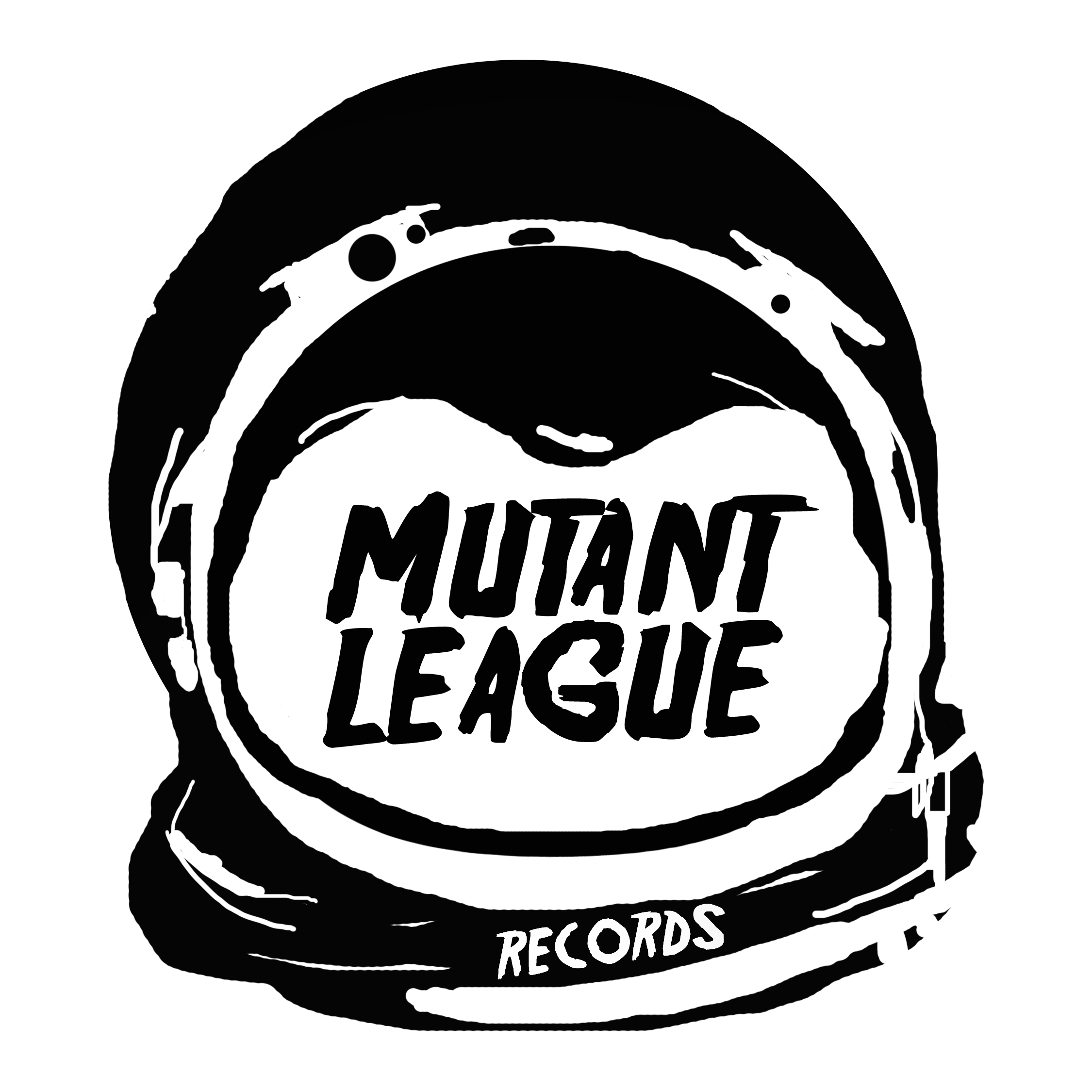
- Founded: 2012
- Founder: Nate Steinheimer
- Distributors: The Orchard (current), RED, Victory Records, Concord Music
- Genre: Various
- Country of origin: United States
- Location: Chicago, Illinois
- Official website: www.mutantleaguerecords.com

Mutant League Records is an American independent record label based in Chicago. Established in 2012, Mutant League has released albums for seminal pop-punk groups such as Seaway, Belmont, and As It Is among others. As of 2022, the label has sold over 250,000 albums worldwide.

Owner Nate Steinheimer commented on the label's inception, "I spent my weekends sweating through Descendents T-shirts in crowded Chicago basements [...] I aim to house artists that influence people to become as passionate about music as I was growing up." In July 2013, Mutant League announced their partnership with Sony RED and fellow Chicago label Victory for worldwide distribution.

The label contributed music for the soundtrack of the 2018 Xbox One/PlayStation 4 title Mutant Football League, which included tracks from Seaway, Belmont, Vacant Home, Ambleside, & Lucky Boys Confusion.

In 2019, Victory Records was sold for a reported $30 million to Concord Music. Following the sale, Mutant League moved under the umbrella of Sony Music subsidiary The Orchard for distribution in North America. The label celebrated their 10-year anniversary with a string of Midwest tour dates in the summer of 2022, which featured Settle Your Scores, Chief State, and Wilmette.

== Bands ==
This list includes artists who have released albums through Mutant League:

- A Better Hand
- Allister
- AM Taxi
- Ambleside
- Anna Sage
- As It Is
- Crywank
- A Fight For Life
- Belmont
- Chief State
- Home Grown
- Johnny Goth
- Lucky Boys Confusion
- The Movielife
- Night Owls
- Picture Perfect
- Rest Easy
- Reward
- Safe To Say
- Sea of Treachery
- Seaway
- Settle Your Scores
- Such Gold
- Sweet Time
- Vacant Home
- Wilmette
- With The Punches
