= Whatever I Say Is Royal Ocean =

EP by Dance Gavin Dance
- Released: November 14, 2006
- Recorded: 2006
- Studio: Deathbot Studios
- Length: 27:43
- Label: Rise
- Producers: Phil Devereux; Kris Crummett

Dance Gavin Dance chronology
Demo (2006)	Whatever I Say Is Royal Ocean (2006)	Downtown Battle Mountain (2007)

Whatever I Say Is Royal Ocean is the debut EP by American post-hardcore band Dance Gavin Dance. Released on November 14, 2006, the album was originally recorded over a six month period with producer Phil Devereux and was subsequently produced and mastered by Kris Crummett after the band signed to Rise Records.

The artwork for the EP is a painting by unclean vocalist, Jon Mess—as opposed to Mattias Adolfsson, who has made cover art for all of the band's following albums.

== Track listing ==
All tracks are written by Will Swan, Jonny Craig, Jon Mess, and Matt Mingus.

No.	Title	Length
1.	"Whatever I Say Is Royal Ocean"	0:48
2.	"The Robot with Human Hair, Pt. 1"	4:14
3.	"The Robot vs. Heroin Battle of Vietnam"	3:04
4.	"Tidal Waves: Breakfast, Lunch, and Dinner"	3:29
5.	"The Importance of Cocaine"	4:38
6.	"The Robot with Human Hair, Pt. 2"	5:45
7.	"Burning Down the Nicotine Armoire"	5:45
Total length:		27:43

== Personnel ==
Dance Gavin Dance

- Jonny Craig – clean vocals
- Jon Mess – unclean vocals, artwork
- Will Swan – lead guitar
- Sean O'Sullivan – rhythm guitar
- Eric Lodge – bass guitar
- Matt Mingus – drums, percussion

Additional personnel

- Dance Gavin Dance – production
- Phil Devereux – production, engineering and mixing
- Kris Crummett – mastering
- Kaela Christianson – CD artwork drawn
