= Downtown Battle Mountain =

Studio album by Dance Gavin Dance
- Released: May 15, 2007
- Recorded: January–February 2007
- Genres: Post-hardcore; math rock; emo
- Length: 40:05
- Label: Rise
- Producer: Kris Crummett

Dance Gavin Dance chronology
Whatever I Say Is Royal Ocean (2006)	Downtown Battle Mountain (2007)	Dance Gavin Dance (2008)

Singles from Downtown Battle Mountain
- 1. "And I Told Them I Invented Times New Roman" Released: 2007; 2. "Lemon Meringue Tie" Released: 2007; 3. "The Backwards Pumpkin Song" Released: 2007; 4. "Open Your Eyes and Look North" Released: 2007

Professional ratings
Review scores
Source	Rating
AbsolutePunk	(80%)
Allmusic	2.5/5 stars
Kerrang!	3/5 stars
Punknews.org	4/5 stars

Downtown Battle Mountain is the debut studio album by American post-hardcore band Dance Gavin Dance, released on May 15, 2007, on Rise Records. The album serves as a follow-up to the band's debut extended play, Whatever I Say Is Royal Ocean, which was released in 2006. The title of the album was inspired by the unincorporated town Battle Mountain, Nevada after the band visited the city. The album was produced by Kris Crummett, who would go on to produce most of the band's future studio releases.

The album was supported by four singles; "And I Told Them I Invented Times New Roman", "Lemon Meringue Tie", "The Backwards Pumpkin Song", and "Open Your Eyes and Look North". It is the band's first of two studio albums to feature clean vocalist Jonny Craig. Craig left in late 2007, later re-joining in mid-2010. It is also the band's only full-length to feature guitarist Sean O'Sullivan, who left the band in late 2007. A non-direct sequel to the album, titled Downtown Battle Mountain II, was released on March 8, 2011.

== Track listing ==
All tracks are written by Will Swan, Jonny Craig, Jon Mess, and Matt Mingus, except where noted.

No.	Title	Writer(s)	Length
1.	"Untitled"		0:48
2.	"And I Told Them I Invented Times New Roman"		4:48
3.	"It's Safe to Say You Dig the Backseat"		5:14
4.	"Strawberry André"		3:13
5.	"Lemon Meringue Tie"		3:50
6.	"The Backwards Pumpkin Song"	Swan, Craig, Mess, Eric Lodge, Robert William Fort, Jason Fox	4:06
7.	"Antlion"		3:19
8.	"Turn Off the Lights, I'm Watching Back to the Future"		3:59
9.	"Open Your Eyes and Look North"		4:29
10.	"Surprise! I'm from Cuba, Everyone Has One Brain"		4:54
11.	"12 Hours, 630 Miles"	Swan, Craig, Mess, Lodge, Fort, Fox	1:24
Total length:			40:04

== Personnel ==
Dance Gavin Dance

- Jonny Craig – clean vocals
- Jon Mess – unclean vocals
- Will Swan – lead guitar
- Sean O'Sullivan – rhythm guitar
- Eric Lodge – bass guitar
- Matt Mingus – drums, percussion

Additional personnel

- Kris Crummett – production, engineering, mixing, mastering
- Mattias Adolfsson – artwork

== Charts ==
Chart (2007)	Peak position
Billboard Top Heatseekers	46
