= Closure in Moscow =

Australian rock band

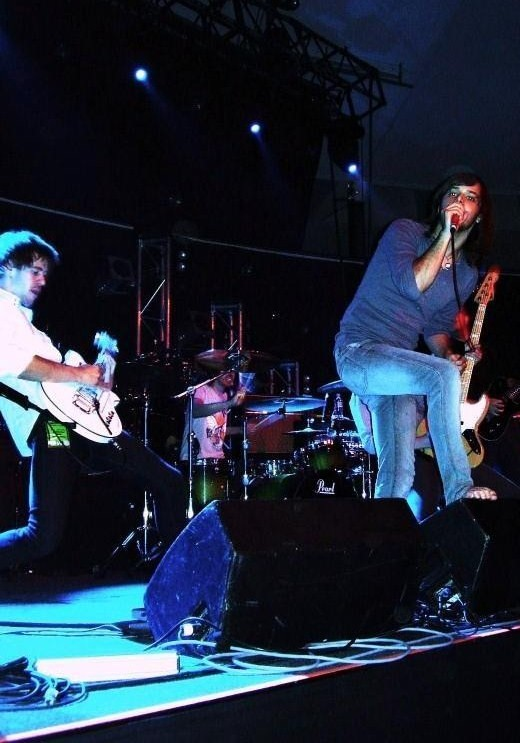
- Closure In Moscow supporting Coheed and Cambria at the UNSW Roundhouse in Sydney

Background information
- Origin: Melbourne, Victoria, Australia
- Genres: Alternative rock, progressive rock, post-hardcore
- Years active: 2006–present
- Labels: Sabretusk (AUS); Birds Robe (AUS); Warner Bros. (US); Equal Vision (US)
- Members: Mansur Zennelli; Christopher deCinque; Michael Barrett; Salvatore Aidone; Duncan Millar
- Past members: Beau Mckee; Brad Kimber
- Website: Closureinmoscow.com

Closure in Moscow is an Australian progressive rock band that formed in Melbourne, Victoria in 2006. The group is composed of guitarist-singer Mansur Zennelli, guitarist Michael Barrett, drummer Salvatore Aidone, bassist Duncan Millar and lead singer Christopher de Cinque. To date they have released one extended play and three full-length studio albums: The Penance and the Patience (2008), First Temple (2009), Pink Lemonade (2014), and Soft Hell (2023) respectively. The band has reached notable success throughout the international rock circuit for their live performances and avant-garde sound.

== History ==
=== 2006–2008: Formation and The Penance and the Patience ===
18 months after forming, Closure in Moscow released their debut EP (self-proclaimed "albumette") in 2008, titled The Penance and the Patience. Upon the release of the EP, the band members were an average age of 21, and the complete lineup had been together for only a few months. They went to extreme lengths to record The Penance and the Patience: the band spent three to four months straight writing or doing preproduction, as well as quitting jobs to go on tour. It was eventually recorded at Sing Sing Studios in Melbourne, with each of the band members selling his car to get American music producer and engineer Kris Crummett out to do the album. Crummett had previously worked on albums with Drop Dead Gorgeous, Fear Before the March of Flames, Kaddisfly and Dance Gavin Dance. The "albumette" was completed in July 2007, nine months before its release.

The Penance and the Patience was originally released only in Australia and New Zealand, through Taperjean Records and Shock Records respectively. It was also available for import to overseas countries through Fist2Face, and through the iTunes Store as a worldwide digital download. The EP debuted at number 13 on the Australian Independent Record (AIR) album charts.

=== 2009–2012: First Temple ===
In November 2008, following the original announcement months prior, the band was confirmed to be permanently relocating to the United States. Closure in Moscow discontinued their contract with Science Records, upon which the group said, "after much deliberation, we mutually felt it would be best not to move forward with our relationship." They then signed with Equal Vision Records. The move took place in early 2009, with the members heading straight into the studio to record their debut studio album. The producer of The Penance and the Patience, Kris Crummett, returned to produce the album, First Temple, which was released on 5 May 2009. The band used a wide array of instruments to achieve a fuller sound, including double bass, trumpet, trombone and a dobro guitar with strings that were 20 years old. The album peaked at number five on the AIR Album 100% Indie Chart and was mentioned in Alternative Press's list of "100 Bands You Need to Know in 2009".

The band joined Emery on the select dates in the Zumiez Couch Tour 2009, then went on the Thee Summer Bailout Tour with Emery, Kiros, Maylene and the Sons of Disaster, Ivoryline and Secret & Whisper. On select dates during the tour, they joined The Audition and The Higher on The Audition for the Higher Tour, which also includes Runner Runner, In:Aviate and The Hoodies. The band returned to Australia in the start of December 2009 to play shows possibly through to January and February 2010, performing at Homebake festival and Bird's Robe Collective's end-of-year showcase at the Annandale Hotel in December; and significantly as the only Australian band to undertake the full Soundwave festival through February and March.

At the AIR Awards of 2009, Closure in Moscow's First Temple was nominated for Best Independent Hard Rock/Punk Album. In May and June 2010 the band completed a headlining tour of Australia, with support from Adelaide's Secrets in Scale and For This Cause in Brisbane. Following this, Closure in Moscow returned to the US to play the entire 2010 Van's Warped Tour.

In early 2011 the band's website confirmed that drummer Beau McKee and bassist Brad Kimber were no longer members of the band. New drummer Salvatore Aidone toured with the band in Japan (with FACT) during 2011. In May the band announced via its Twitter and Facebook pages that Duncan Millar, a member of the funk band Saskwatch, also with Aidone, would be playing bass permanently for Closure in Moscow.

Band members Michael Barrett, Mansur Zennelli, and Christopher de Cinque worked as session musicians on the album A Dream Is a Question You Don't Know How to Answer by Jonny Craig.

=== 2013–2015: Pink Lemonade ===
In late 2013, Closure in Moscow released "The Church of the Technochrist". In 2014 the band released "Seeds of Gold". Closure in Moscow released their second studio album, Pink Lemonade on 9 May 2014 and although met with mixed reactions, it was reviewed favourably by The Dillinger Escape Plan's Liam Wilson.

After some delay, the band announced the Pink Lemonade UK and Europe headlining tour for late 2015. However, the band suffered misfortune when their van was broken into and their belongings stolen after a sold-out show at London's The Garage. Fans supported a GoFundMe campaign to help replenish their supplies, but several new song demos were lost on a laptop that was stolen. Later in the tour, following the Paris terror attacks, the band announced the cancellation of several remaining shows due to anxiety issues.

=== 2016–2022: Touring activity ===
In 2016 the band signed with management The Bird's Robe Collective, and toured nationally as support for Coheed and Cambria in May, then followed by joining The Fall of Troy on their first Australian tour in eight years.

In 2017, the band returned from writing sessions to play shows with Protest The Hero, before announcing they would premiere new material live on tour with Danish dream pop group MEW in September. The shows with MEW would also mark Closure in Moscow's first Perth show in four years. In September, the band were announced as the support for The Dillinger Escape Plan's final ever Australian tour at their sold-out shows in Melbourne, Sydney and Brisbane.

2018 saw Closure in Moscow return to North America for the first time in eight years, supporting Protest The Hero during March and April, as well as playing their own headline dates in New York, Pennsylvania and Texas where they performed First Temple in full. The band also announced a warm-up show at Melbourne's The Workers Club, which sold out in March. Later in 2018 the band decamped to continue writing their third album.

=== 2023–present: Soft Hell ===
On 3 March 2023, the band announced their next album, Soft Hell, would be released on 27 October 2023. They also announced the lead single off the album, "Better Way", would be released on 10 March 2023. The band later released videos for 'Primal Sinister' and 'Keeper of the Lake' ahead of the full album release.

The band embarked on two headline tours of the US in February & July 2024, as well as a headline tour of Australia, the UK & Europe in May. Guests for these tours included Gold Necklace (USA), Toehider (Australia/USA) & Harts (Australia).

In 2025, the band joined The Fall of Troy and A Lot Like Birds for a national tour of the USA during April, May & June. They also performed at the Bird's Robe Records 15th birthday tour in Sydney & Melbourne during December.

February 2026 saw the band invite The Dear Hunter & Anthony Green for a three-date Australian tour.

== Musical style and influences ==
The band's debut release, The Penance and the Patience, has been called reminiscent of Saosin's debut EP, Translating the Name. Similarities with Saosin have also been noted in a live review in Sydney street press Drum Media of a show with label mates Fifty Sixx. The review says the band is "...combining the melodies that make bands like Saosin so popular with some off-time breakdowns and samples, taking little time to win over the crowd." The band has also been compared to other experimental and progressive rock acts The Mars Volta and Circa Survive by music website Absolute Punk. Additionally, they have been likened to post-hardcore band Chiodos, and defined as having "more in common with complex, seasoned bands like Rush and Tool than they do with fellow Aussie rockers AC/DC".

Their style has been described as a "catchy, yet melodic, brand of progressive, avant-garde rock" by Kill Your Stereo. However, the rise of previous bands with similar styles, such as Coheed and Cambria, has altered the meaning of avant-garde, which describes "those artists, writers, or musicians, whose techniques and ideas are in advance of those generally accepted." When asked by Australian radio presenter Zan Rowe about their comparison with bands such as Saosin and The Mars Volta, guitarist Michael Barrett alluded to the influence of 1970s bands like King Crimson and Yes, mentioning that "they're not that different from The Mars Volta" and it was a "natural progression".

== Personnel ==
- Christopher de Cinque – lead vocals (2006–present)
- Mansur Zennelli – guitar, vocals (2006–present)
- Michael Barrett – guitar (2006–present)
- Salvatore Aidone – drums (2010–present)
- Duncan Millar – bass guitar (2010–present)

=== Former members ===
- Beau Mckee – drums (2006–2010)
- Brad Kimber – bass guitar (2006–2010)

== Discography ==
=== Studio albums ===
List of studio albums, with selected details and peak chart positions
| Title | Details | Peak chart positions |
| Title | Details | AUS |
|---|---|---|
| First Temple | Released: May 2009; Label: Equal Vision (EVR168); Formats: CD, digital download | — |
| Pink Lemonade | Released: May 2014; Label: Sabre Tusk (SABRE001); Formats: CD, 2×LP, digital download | — |
| Soft Hell | Released: 27 October 2023; Label: Bird's Robe; Formats: CD, 2×LP, digital download | 79 |

=== Extended plays ===
List of EP, with selected details
| Title | Extended play details |
|---|---|
| The Penance and the Patience | Released: 18 April 2008; Label: Taperjean Music (TJM009); Formats: CD, digital download |

== Awards and nominations ==
=== AIR Awards ===
The Australian Independent Record Awards (commonly known informally as AIR Awards) is an annual awards night to recognise, promote and celebrate the success of Australia's Independent Music sector.

| Year | Nominee / work | Award | Result |
|---|---|---|---|
| 2009 | First Temple | Best Independent Hard Rock/Punk Album | Nominated |

=== Music Victoria Awards ===
The Music Victoria Awards (previously known as The Age EG Awards and The Age Music Victoria Awards) are an annual awards night celebrating Victorian music.

| Year | Nominee / work | Award | Result | Ref. |
|---|---|---|---|---|
| 2014 | Pink Lemonade | Best Heavy Album | Nominated | |
