= To Better Days (album) =

Studio album by Slaves (Rain City Drive)
- Released: August 7, 2020
- Recorded: 2019
- Genres: Pop rock; post-hardcore; alternative rock
- Length: 38:23
- Labels: The Orchard; SBG
- Producer: Jimmy Alexander

Slaves (Rain City Drive) chronology
Beautiful Death (2018)	To Better Days (2020)	Rain City Drive (2022)

Singles from To Better Days
- 1. "Heavier" Released: July 26, 2019; 2. "Prayers" Released: November 22, 2019; 3. "Bury a Lie" Released: January 31, 2020; 4. "Talk To A Friend" Released: March 27, 2020; 5. "Like I Do" Released: June 26, 2020; 6. "Eye Opener" Released: July 17, 2020

To Better Days is the fourth studio album by American rock band Slaves, released on August 7, 2020, through SBG Records as a follow-up to their third studio album, Beautiful Death (2018). The album was produced by Jimmy Alexander and is the band's first release to feature lead vocalist Matt McAndrew, rhythm guitarist Felipe Sanchez, and drummer Zachary Baker. It is also their first release since the departure of original lead vocalist Jonny Craig, who left the group in January 2019.

It's the band's final album released under the name Slaves, having changed their name briefly to Rain City, then finally to Rain City Drive in 2021. The album is marketed under the Rain City Drive catalog on digital retailers; in such places, the Slaves logo has been removed from the cover art.

== Track listing ==
No.	Title	Length
1.	"To Better Days"	1:05
2.	"Prayers"	3:15
3.	"Witch Hunt"	2:46
4.	"Talk To A Friend"	3:31
5.	"Eye Opener"	3:23
6.	"Bury a Lie"	3:16
7.	"Heavier"	3:37
8.	"Footprints"	3:03
9.	"Cursed"	3:08
10.	"Wasting My Youth"	2:54
11.	"Clean Again"	1:25
12.	"Secrets"	3:47
13.	"Like I Do"	3:10
Total length:		38:23

== Credits and personnel ==
Slaves

- Matt McAndrew – lead vocals, additional guitar
- Colin Vieira – bass guitar
- Weston Richmond – lead guitar
- Felipe Sanchez – rhythm guitar
- Zachary Baker – drums, percussion

Additional personnel

- Jimmy Alexander – producer
