= To Better Days =

To Better Days may refer to:

- To Better Days (film), a 2012 Turkish drama film
- To Better Days (album), a 2020 album by Slaves
