= The Young Souls =

Studio album by Myka Relocate
- Released: October 30, 2015
- Genre: Metalcore
- Length: 41:44:00
- Label: Artery Recordings
- Producers: Erik Ron and Joey Sturgis

Myka Relocate chronology
Lies to Light the Way (2013)	The Young Souls (2015)
- Creative Direction and Polaroids by Zakk Autrey, Design by Ethan Silva, photography by Sergio Necoechea

The Young Souls is the third and final studio album from American metalcore band Myka Relocate. Released on 30 October 2015, the work was released on Artery Recordings and was produced by Erik Ron and Joey Sturgis.

== Background ==
In 2013, the ensemble spent a great deal of time connecting with fans, which dramatically influenced the album. In September 2015, the group broadcast that their second studio album would be released at the end of October. On 24 September 2015, the ensemble released "New Again", which became the first single from the work. In October, the band published three singles which came from the record. "Cold Hearts", the second single, was published on 8 October. One week later, on 15 October 2015, "Bring You Home" was released as the third single from the album. On 22 October 2015, "Damage" was announced as the fourth single from the work.

On 24 February 2016, a music video for "Nerve" was published.

== Composition ==
The album was written in Joey Sturgis' basement by guitarist Austin Doré and clean vocalist Michael Swank.

Screaming vocalist John Ritter states that "Cold Hearts" "challenges the 'superior' demeanor society uses to judge its youth", opposing the aversion that young ambitious people face. In a later interview, he told New Noise Magazine that "Damage" is about realizing that one is in a bad romantic partnership, and that "it investigates the thought process during these moments of clarity, and the determination to separate [one's self] from it". Swank stated that the album focused heavily on relationships with other people, and that the title "goes out to today's youth" and that it "follows the ups and downs of growing up in this day and age, trying to become comfortable in one's own skin".

== Touring ==
While the record was released, the band toured with American metalcore band Escape the Fate.

During March and April 2016, the ensemble performed throughout the United States with Slaves, Capture the Crown, Outline in Color and Conquer Divide, and performed at "Scream Out Fest" in early June 2016 at AgeHa (Shinkiba Studio Coast) in Shinkiba, Japan.

=== The Young Souls Tour ===
From mid-June until mid-July 2016, the band travelled the United States for The Young Souls Tour. As the very first nationwide headline run for the ensemble, Out Came The Wolves and Light Up The Sky performed as support.

== Critical reception ==
Comparing the ensemble to both We Came as Romans and Fall Out Boy, Nicholas Fike of FlippenMusic stated that the band was "able to take the best of both worlds [nu-metal and mainstream rock] and combine it with a touch of their own". Matthew Powers of CaliberTV said "When Michael Swank sings the sound is more upbeat, and top 40-worthy than it's ever been", going on that "When John Ritter unleashes his aggressive roars the sound takes on a spirited blend of nu-metal and hardcore" and that "When they work together they are nearly a more competent vocal duo than their long-established peers." New Noise Magazine stated that the work "mixes Michael Swank's electrifying voice and John Ritter's crushing screams for a wicked sophomore release".

Shae Beaudoin of Remember MEdia describes the tunes as touching "on broken trust, feeling lost, and letting go of negative people in your life, realizing you're strong enough to move on."

== Track listing ==
All music is composed by Myka Relocate.

No.	Title	Length
1.	"Hide the Truth"	3:31
2.	"Bring You Home"	2:55
3.	"Damage"	3:22
4.	"Only Steps Away"	3:43
5.	"Nerve"	4:11
6.	"New Again"	3:22
7.	"Cold Hearts"	3:44
8.	"Rescue Me"	3:24
9.	"Eyes Wide Shut"	3:22
10.	"The Company You Keep" (featuring Christian Koo of Alive in Standby)	3:36
11.	"Idle Hands"	3:28
12.	"The Young Souls"	3:16
Total length:		41:44

== Personnel ==
- John Ritter – unclean vocals
- Michael Swank – clean vocals
- Luke Burleigh – bass
- Austin Doré – guitar, programming
- Josh Peltier – guitar
- Aaron Robertson – drums

== Chart history ==
Chart (2015)	Peak position
US Billboard Top Heatseekers	7
US Billboard Independent Albums	36
US Billboard Rock Albums	48
US Billboard Hard Rock Albums	16
