= Playing It Safe =

Playing It Safe may refer to:

- "Playing It Safe", an episode from season 1 of Barney & Friends
- "Playing It Safe", a song by Myka Relocate from the album Lies to Light the Way
