= Rain City Drive =

Alternative rock band from Palm Coast, Florida

- Also known as: Rain City (2021)
- Origin: Palm Coast, Florida, U.S.
- Genres: Post-hardcore; hard rock; alternative rock; pop rock
- Years active: 2021–present
- Labels: SBG; Thriller
- Spinoff of: Slaves
- Members: Matt McAndrew; Colin Vieira; Weston Richmond; Felipe Sanchez
- Past members: Zachary Baker
- Website: https://raincitydrive.com

Rain City Drive is an American rock band from Palm Coast, Florida. The band emerged from the evolution of Sacramento-based band Slaves, and features The Voice runner-up Matt McAndrew on vocals. The group name is derived from Manchester, England, sometimes referred to as the "rainy city", where the five members initially met.

Their first album, To Better Days, was initially released under their previous iteration name, but was later re-released and exists currently in digital stores as part of Rain City Drive's catalog.

The band would go on to sign to independent record label Thriller Records, and release their self-titled studio album on July 15, 2022.

== History ==
All members of Rain City Drive were initially part of the post-hardcore band Slaves. With the departure of Jonny Craig, then Slaves continued their touring endeavors across Europe and Australia, with Matt McAndrew assuming the role of lead vocalist.

On June 25, 2020, the band officially announced on Facebook that their final release under the name Slaves would be To Better Days. In a statement, the band expressed their support for the BLM movement and their decision to disassociate their music from a term laden with negative connotations. The album was subsequently released on August 7, 2020.

On October 15, 2021, the band announced their decision to continue creating music and performing as a new band, Rain City Drive. The name is a reference to the first meeting of the band members in Manchester, England, often referred to as the "rainy city". The members said the name stands "as a reminder to keep looking up even when there’s a cloud overhead". The band expressed gratitude to their dedicated fans, dedicating their new album to their "unwavering support". On November 6, 2021, the band announced through their Instagram page that they signed with independent record label Thriller Records and they would adopt the name Rain City Drive. Accompanying this announcement was the release of their new single, Cutting It Close.

== Band members ==
Current

- Matt McAndrew – lead vocals, additional guitar (2019–present)
- Weston Richmond – lead guitar (2015–present)
- Felipe Sanchez – rhythm guitar, backing vocals (2017–present)
- Colin Vieira – bass (2015–present)

Former

- Zachary Baker – drums (2021–2025)

Touring

- Matt Arsenault – drums (2025)

- Jeeves Avalos (2025)

== Discography ==
=== Studio albums ===
- To Better Days (2020)
- Rain City Drive (2022)
- Things are Different Now (2024)

=== Singles ===
List of singles, showing year released and album name
Song	Year	Peak chart		Album
Song	Year	US Hard Rock	US Main.	Album
"Cutting It Close"	2021	—	—	Rain City Drive
"Dreams"	2022	—	—	Rain City Drive
"Waiting On You"	2022	—	—	Rain City Drive
"Dying For"	2022	—	—	Rain City Drive
"Frozen"	2023	—	32	Things are Different Now
"Medicate Me" (with Dayseeker)	2024	17	32	Things are Different Now
"Neverbloom"	2024	—	—	Things are Different Now
"Over Me"	2024	—	—	Things are Different Now
"Concrete Closure"	2024	—	—	Things are Different Now
"Wish You the Best"	2024	—	31	Things are Different Now
"Easy Exit" (with Sace6)	2025	—	—	Non-album single
"Ride or Die"	2025	—	—	TBA
"Slither"	2026	—	—	TBA

=== Videography ===
Year	Title	Link	From the album	Directors
2019	"Heavier"		To Better Days	Orie McGinness
2019	"Prayers"		To Better Days	Orie McGinness & Dana Willax
2020	"Bury a Lie"		To Better Days	Lance Gergar
2020	"Talk to a Friend"		To Better Days	Aaron Berkshire
2020	"Wasting My Youth"		To Better Days	Orie McGinness & Dana Willax
2020	"Like I Do"		To Better Days	Orie McGinness & Dana Willax
2020	"Eye Opener"		To Better Days	Orie McGinness & Dana Willax
2021	"Cutting It Close"		Rain City Drive	Matt Boda
2022	"Dreams"		Rain City Drive	Katharine White
2022	"Waiting on You"		Rain City Drive	Vicente Cordero
2022	"Blood Runs Cold"		Rain City Drive	Matt Boda
2023	"Frozen"		Things are Different Now	Matthue Coda
2024	"Wish You the Best"		Things are Different Now	Sam Link
2025	"Ride or Die"		TBA	Vicente Cordero
