= Find What You Love and Let It Kill You =

"Find What You Love and Let It Kill You" may refer to:

== Music ==
- Find What You Love and Let It Kill You (Jonny Craig album)
- Find What You Love and Let It Kill You (Hurricane No. 1 album)
- "Find What You Love and Let It Kill You", a song by Linus Pauling Quartet
- Find What You Love and Let It Kill You, a 2019 short film
