= Pink Lemonade =

Pink Lemonade may refer to:

- Pink lemonade, a drink
- Pink Lemonade (Pink Panther cartoon), a 1978 episode of The All New Pink Panther Show
- Pink Lemonade (album), by Closure in Moscow, 2014
- "Pink Lemonade" (song), by James Bay, 2018
- "Pink Lemonade", a song by D-Block Europe from Rolling Stone, 2024
- "Pink Lemonade", a song by the Wombats from Glitterbug, 2015
- "Pink Lemonade", a song by The Peppermint Rainbow, 1969
- "Pink Lemonade", the opening theme for As Miss Beelzebub Likes, by Sangatsu no Phantasia, 2018
