= Slaves (American band) =

American post-hardcore band (2014–2020)

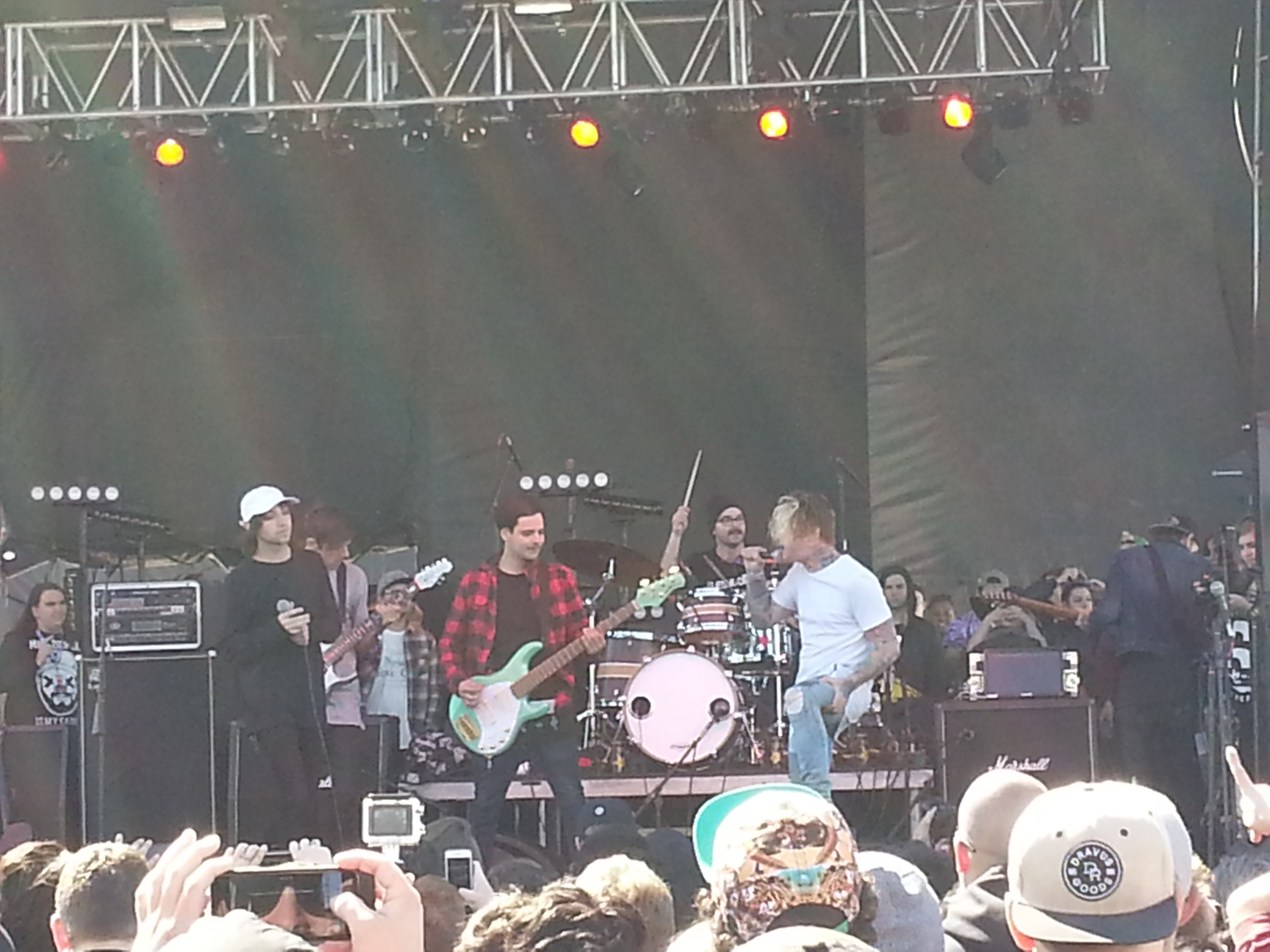
- Slaves performing with Michael Swank of Myka Relocate in 2016

Background information
- Origin: Sacramento, California, U.S.
- Genres: Post-hardcore; pop rock; alternative rock; djent; alternative metal; R&B
- Years active: 2014–2020
- Labels: The Orchard; Sony; WMG; Artery
- Spinoffs: Rain City Drive
- Past members: Colin Vieira; Weston Richmond; Felipe Sanchez; Zachary Baker; Jonny Craig; Matt McAndrew

Slaves was an American post-hardcore group formed in Sacramento, California. The band consisted of bassist Colin Vieira, guitarists Weston Richmond and Juan Felipe Sanchez, drummer Zachary Baker, and lead vocalist Jonny Craig. The band released their debut album, Through Art We Are All Equals on June 24, 2014. Their second studio album, Routine Breathing, was released on August 21, 2015. The band released their third studio album Beautiful Death on February 16, 2018.

All members except Craig would go on to form the Florida-based rock band Rain City Drive, with The Voice runner-up Matt McAndrew on lead vocals, signing to independent record label Thriller Records.

== History ==
=== Formation and Through Art We Are All Equals (2014) ===
The band members were revealed through lead singer Jonny Craig's Twitter account on January 15. The following day he tweeted that the name of the group would be called Slaves, a name coined by founding drummer Tai Wright.

Craig explained the name in an article on Ryan's Rock Show. "Men have been enslaving men for as long as we've had gods to hide behind," Craig said. "Every man is a slave to what we love – whether it be women, drugs, music or sports. Through art we are all equals".

On March 3, Alternative Press posted an article stating that Artery Recordings had signed Craig's band Slaves to their label were now on their roster. Craig posted a tweet saying that his original record label Rise Records would not be associated with this new band.

The band went on their first US tour in May in direct support of Hands Like Houses, Miss Fortune, and Alive Like Me, in May and June.

Slaves released their first single The Fire Down Below through Artery Recordings on April 22. The album, Through Art We Are All Equals, was produced by Kris Crummett, and was released on June 24, 2014. The album features guest vocals from Kyle Lucas, Tyler Carter of Issues, Vic Fuentes of Pierce The Veil, as well as Jonny Craig's sister, Natalie Craig. The album's track listing was released in May 2014. The album debuted on No. 53 at official Billboard 200 charts in the U.S.

On May 13, 2014, the band's second single, "the Upgrade Pt. II" (a sequel to his song The Upgrade from his EP Find What You Love And Let It Kill You), was streamed off Artery Recordings' YouTube page. Later that month, on May 29, the band released a lyric video for the third single from the album, "Starving for Friends", which featured Vic Fuentes of Pierce the Veil.

Slaves was revealed to be a supporter on the All Stars Tour. This was Jonny Craig's second time being on the All Stars Tour, the first time being with Dance Gavin Dance which ultimately led to him being kicked out of the band.

On May 30, bassist Jason Mays announced via Facebook that he would not be continuing with Slaves due to family problems and health issues. Andrew Mena, formerly of Scarlett O'Hara filled in temporarily and toured with the band for the remaining dates. After Andrew Mena went back to his duties of being a tour manager, Michael Nordeen, an operations manager at Artery Recordings was convinced by Alex Lyman to join the band for a few tours. In the beginning of Winter, 2014, Colin Vieira joined Slaves yet again.

On June 24, 2014, Slaves announced one headlining show in Las Vegas, Nevada on July 9, 2014. In the following days they announced an overseas tour to Australia, along with a headlining tour starting on October 7, with bands such as Nightmares, Myka Relocate, among others.

On July 9, the band's first official music video was released on the Artery Recording's YouTube for the album's fourth and final single, "My Soul Is Empty and Full of White Girls", directed/produced by Jeremy Tremp and Shan Dan.

=== Routine Breathing and line-up instability (2015–2016) ===
On January 7, 2015, the band uploaded a picture to their Facebook page claiming that "Slaves has officially started writing their 2nd full length album, get excited!" with the following "#SLAVES2015"

On February 9, guitarist Christopher Kim announced his departure via Twitter. He was replaced with Jonathan Wolfe to fill-in temporarily on tour, though was allegedly "ditched in Texas" by the band just a few days later. The band replaced Wolfe on the road with Weston Richmond.

On June 21, Alex Lyman and Weston Richmond were injured in a knife attack in Sacramento. Also injured was Blake Abbey, lead singer of Musical Charis. Charis stated that the attack was invoked by the three of them wearing skinny jeans.

On July 5, the band tweeted a picture of the track list for Routine Breathing. The track list features 15 songs, with guest vocals from Garret Rapp (The Color Morale), Spencer Chamberlain (Sleepwave and Underoath), Tilian Pearson (Dance Gavin Dance), and Kyle Lucas. Also, a 15-second teaser of the song "Burning Our Morals Away" was posted, along with album artwork for Routine Breathing.

On July 9, the debut single from their second album leaked online. The band then released the single, "Burning Our Morals Away", on July 10. The album was scheduled for an October release date, but was pushed to August 21, 2015. The band was voted off of Vans Warped tour on July 18 after only playing two dates on the tour. The band cited that they were voted off the tour by the other bands on Warped, fearing that Jonny would begin his drug use again. On July 23, the band released the second single from Routine Breathing, "Death Never Let Us Say Goodbye". They released the official video for "Burning Our Morals Away" later that week. On August 16, the band released the third single from Routine Breathing, "Drowning In My Addiction" with a lyric video.

From March until April 2016, the group was scheduled to tour the United States with Myka Relocate, Capture the Crown, Outline in Color and Conquer Divide.

On March 30, Alex Lyman announced he would be leaving the band after their current tour with Capture The Crown. On April 9, Tai Wright announced his formal departure from the Slaves, citing issues within the band as his reason. On April 10, the band announced their breakup after their last show in Santa Cruz, California.

On May 20, Jonny announced on his Facebook that Slaves did not break up but were going through some difficult times, with Jonny and Colin being the only members remaining.

=== Beautiful Death, Craig's Departure and Label Change (2017–2019) ===
On August 11, the band announced their upcoming headlining tour featuring Outline in Color and Avion Roe, all while actively working on their third album. Following this, on January 20, 2017, the band released the single "I'd Rather See Your Star Explode".

Initially scheduled for a September 2017 release, their third studio album "Beautiful Death" faced a delay to January 2018 due to a label split and Jonny Craig's hospitalization. The band introduced their first US headline tour, "The Beautiful Death Tour", on July 10, featuring support from Secrets, Picturesque, and Out Came The Wolves. The tour also previewed new songs from the forthcoming third album, slated to commence on September 1, 2017. On November 3, Colin confirmed their signing with Warner Brothers.

Subsequently, on November 17, 2017, Artery Recordings announced via Twitter that they were parting ways with Slaves, citing accusations against Jonny Craig of multiple counts of sexual assault.

On December 21, 2017, the band revealed that their third studio album would be released on February 16, 2018, through Sony Music label The Orchard. In early January 2018, they announced a new headlining tour, featuring support from Kyle Lucas, Dayshell, and Ghost Town, in promotion of the new album. The tour commenced in Dallas, TX on the day of the album's release and was scheduled to conclude on March 12, 2018, in Scottsdale, AZ.

The band ultimately released their third studio album, Beautiful Death, on February 16, 2018, under SBG Records and The Orchard. On January 24, 2019, the band announced the removal of Jonny Craig from the band, citing addiction as the reason for his departure. Jonny Craig subsequently issued a response, explaining that he was prioritizing his health before considering a return to music.

=== Arrival of Matt McAndrew, To Better Days and Rain City Drive ===
The group continued their touring endeavors across Europe and Australia, with Matt McAndrew assuming the role of lead vocalist following Craig's departure. On March 28, a music video for "Wasting My Youth" was released.

On June 25, 2020, the band officially announced on Facebook that their final release under the name Slaves. In a statement, the band expressed their support for the BLM movement and their decision to disassociate their music from a term laden with negative connotations. The fourth studio album, To Better Days, was subsequently released on August 7, 2020.

The band would go on to announce their decision to continue creating music and performing as a new band, Rain City Drive. To Better Days was to become part of Rain City Drive's catalogue, signing with independent record label Thriller Records.

== Band members ==
Final lineup

- Colin Vieira – bass (2014, 2015–2020)
- Weston Richmond – lead guitar (2016–2020), backing vocals (2015–2020), rhythm guitar (2015–2018)
- Felipe Sanchez – rhythm guitar, backing vocals (2018–2020)
- Zachary Baker – drums (2018–2020)
- Matt McAndrew – lead vocals (2019–2020)

Former members

- Jason Mays – bass (2014)
- Christopher Kim – rhythm guitar, percussion, piano (2014–2015)
- Alex Lyman – lead guitar, backing vocals (2014–2016)
- Tai Wright – drums, percussion (2014–2016)
- Jonny Craig – lead vocals (2014–2019)

Former touring members

- Andrew Mena – bass (2014)
- Michael Nordeen – bass (2014)
- Jonathan Wolfe – rhythm guitar (2015)
- Paul Gaul – lead guitar (2016)
- Thomas Michael Joy – rhythm guitar (2016)
- Christian Kett – drums (2016)

Timeline

== Discography ==
=== Studio albums ===
- Through Art We Are All Equals (2014)
- Routine Breathing (2015)
- Beautiful Death (2018)
- To Better Days (2020)

=== Extended plays ===
- Revision (2019)

=== Singles ===
- "The Fire Down Below"
- "The Upgrade, Pt. II"
- "Starving for Friends" (featuring Vic Fuentes)
- "My Soul Is Empty And Full of White Girls"
- "Burning Our Morals Away"
- "Death Never Lets Us Say Goodbye"
- "Drowning In My Addiction"
- "Running Through The 6 With My Soul"
- "I'd Rather See Your Star Explode"
- "True Colors"
- "Patience Is The Virtue"
- "I Know A Lot Of Artists"
- "The Pact"
- "Body On Fire"
- "Heavier"
- "Prayers"

=== Videography ===
Year	Title	Link	From the album	Note
2014	My Soul Is Empty and Full of White Girls		Through Art We Are All Equals	
2015	Burning Our Morals Away		Routine Breathing	
2015	Running Through the !6! with My Soul		Routine Breathing	
2017	I'd Rather See Your Star Explode		Beautiful Death	2 videos made
2018	I Know a Lot of Artists		Beautiful Death	
2018	The Pact		Beautiful Death	
2018	Body on Fire		Revision	
2019	Heavier		Heavier	Single
