= Wasted Love (Matt McAndrew song) =

Single by Matt McAndrew
- Released: December 15, 2014
- Recorded: 2014
- Length: 3:29
- Label: Republic Records
- Songwriters: Sterling Fox, Chantal Kreviazuk, Shimon Moore, Mike Fiorentino
- Producer: Sterling Fox

Matt McAndrew singles chronology
"Somewhere Over the Rainbow" (2014)	"Wasted Love" (2014)

"Wasted Love" is the debut single by American pop singer and The Voice Season 7 runner up Matt McAndrew. The song was written by Sterling Fox, Canadian singer-songwriter Chantal Kreviazuk, Shimon Moore former singer of the hard rock band Sick Puppies, and Mike Fiorentino. This would be McAndrew's first single released on a major label.

The single debuted at number 14 on the Billboard's Hot 100 with opening sales of 209,000 units sold. This was the highest mark ever achieved by a The Voice recording artist to date. until "7 Summers" by Morgan Wallen debuted at number 6 in August 2020.

== Production ==
The song was originally written in Toronto, Ontario in October 2014. After hearing the song the week before The Voice Season 7 finale, Matt and his coach Adam Levine decided it would be a great song for him to sing. The song was produced in New York several days before the finale by Sterling Fox, with additional production by Andrew Horowitz and Koby Hass.

== Background and development ==
Season 7 of The Voice was the first time the show had all four contestants debut singles prior to the inaugural season of the show and Season 5 which Tessanne Chin debut Tumbling Down written by Ryan Tedder.

== Critical reception ==
Immediately after its release, the song shot to #1 on the US iTunes singles chart.

Ashley of The Hollywood Reporter wrote Levine's Matt McAndrew unveiled the heartbreaking original "Wasted Love", from writers Sterling Fox, Chantal Kreviazuk, Shimon Moore and Mike Fiorentino. It blended his palpable emotions onstage with the shouts that he's made a name on so far.

Caila Ball of Idolator wrote Matt McAndrew shines with his performance of "Wasted Love". It's the standout among the three finalists' originals, and puts him on the cusp of checking that tattoo box on his arm he's left open for when he signs a record deal. Despite the completely out of place flames on the stage, Matt McAndrew does not disappoint. He has Adam singing along in the audience, and the potential for an actual hit on his hands.

== Music video ==
=== Reception ===
Upon its release, the video received positive response from critics. Music Times stated "The dramatic, heartbreaking ballad got a suitable dramatic music video. Shot in the expansive Hollywood hills, McAndrew performs in front of the beautiful city, singing straight to the camera and playing the piano. But, it seems as though he and his "Wasted Love" will be forever wasted... tragic."

== Release history ==
Country	Date	Format	Label
United States	December 15, 2014	Digital download	Republic Records

== Live performances ==
On December 15, 2014, the finale night of Season 7 of The Voice McAndrew performed his single.

== Charts ==
Chart (2014)	Peak position
Canada Hot 100 (Billboard)	17
US Billboard Hot 100	14
