= Soft Hell =

Studio album by Closure in Moscow
- Released: October 27, 2023
- Genre: Alternative rock; art rock; progressive rock; progressive pop; experimental rock; psychedelic rock; funk rock
- Length: 50:24
- Label: Bird's Robe

Closure in Moscow chronology
Pink Lemonade (2014)	Soft Hell (2023)

Soft Hell is the third studio album by Australian progressive rock band Closure in Moscow, released on October 27, 2023. It marks the band's return after a nine-year hiatus following their 2014 album Pink Lemonade.

== Background ==
The band described the album's concept as exploring the idea of "getting comfortable with chronic discomfort caused by the choices that fears and trauma lead you to make," encapsulating the experience of living in a "soft hell".

== Track listing ==
All tracks are written and performed by Closure in Moscow.

1. "Jaeger Bomb" – 3:58
2. "Primal Sinister" – 3:28
3. "Absolute Terror Field" – 3:39
4. "Better Way" – 4:19
5. "Holy Rush" – 3:23
6. "Keeper of the Lake" – 5:09
7. "Lock & Key" – 4:37
8. "Don Juan Triumphant" – 5:04
9. "Soft Hell" – 5:03
10. "Fine" – 3:39
11. "Lovelash" – 4:00
12. "My Dearest Kate" – 4:02

== Release and reception ==
Professional ratings
Review scores
Source	Rating
Sputnikmusic	3.7/5

The album was released on multiple formats, including digital download and a CD edition. The CD version features a gatefold wallet with a 16-page booklet containing lyrics, liner notes, and artwork by Pablo Lineros.

Soft Hell marked the band's debut on the official charts of their home country, entering at number 79 on the Australian Albums Chart. Sputnikmusic website gave the album a score of 3.7 out of 5 and concluded: "the album proves that Closure In Moscow can still do bangers better than anyone else, with the majority of the highlights positively correlating with BPM."

== Personnel ==
- Christopher de Cinque – lead vocals
- Mansur Zennelli – guitar, vocals
- Michael Barrett – guitar
- Duncan Millar – bass
- Salvatore Aidone – drums

== Charts ==
Upon its release, Soft Hell debuted on several Australian charts:

Chart (2023)	Peak position
AIR 100% Independent Chart	1
AIR Independent Chart	3
ARIA Australian Albums Chart	6
ARIA Albums Chart	79
