= The Penance and the Patience =

EP by Closure in Moscow
- Released: 18 April 2008
- Recorded: July 2007
- Studio: Sing Sing Studios, Melbourne
- Genre: Progressive rock; psychedelic rock; alternative rock; post-hardcore
- Length: 25:30
- Label: Taperjean; Shock
- Producer: Kris Crummett; Closure in Moscow

Closure in Moscow chronology
The Penance and the Patience (2008)	First Temple (2009)

Singles from The Penance and the Patience
- 1. "We Want Guarantees, Not Hunger Pains" Released: 2008; 2. "Breathing Underwater" Released: 2008

The Penance and the Patience is the debut EP by Australian rock band Closure in Moscow, released on 18 April 2008 through Taperjean Records. The band advertised the EP as an albumette.

The EP was originally only released in Australia, New Zealand and Japan through Taperjean Records. It was also available for import to overseas countries through Fist2Face, and through the iTunes Store as a worldwide digital download. The EP debuted at #13 on the Australian Independent Record (AIR) album charts. It has received over one million MySpace plays and earned the band a mention in Alternative Press, as one of the "100 Bands You Need to Know in 2009".

The EP was released on vinyl in August 2021, when it re-entered the AIR chart, peaking at number 4.

== Reception ==
Professional ratings
Review scores
Source	Rating
AbsolutePunk	89% Link
Kill Your Stereo	94/100 Link

== Track listing ==
No.	Title	Length
1.	"We Want Guarantees, Not Hunger Pains"	3:58
2.	"Dulcinea"	4:37
3.	"Breathing Underwater"	3:15
4.	"Here's to Entropy"	3:01
5.	"Ofelia... Ofelia"	4:39
6.	"Jewels for Eyes"	6:04

Japanese Bonus Tracks
No.	Title	Length
7.	"The Selfless Art (Demo:Remastered)"	3:31
8.	"We Want Guarantees (Acoustic)"	4:30
9.	"Breathing Underwater (Acoustic)"	3:19

Bonus music video
No.	Title	Length
7.	"We Want Guarantees"	3:58

Bonus documentary
No.	Title	Length
7.	"Recording Documentary"

== Personnel ==
Closure in Moscow

- Michael Barrett – guitar
- Christopher James deCinque – lead vocals
- Brad Kimber – bass guitar
- Beau McKee – drums
- Mansur Zennelli – guitar, vocals

Additional musicians

- Angelina Morino – lead vocals (tracks 3, 5)

Recording and art work

- Recorded – Kris Crummett at Sing Sing Studios, Melbourne
- Produced – Kris Crummett, Closure in Moscow
- Engineered – Kris Crummett, Ben Eherensburg
- Mixed and mastered – Kris Crummett, at Interlace Audio Recording Studios, Portland, Oregon
- Illustration – Joel Melrose
- Art design and layout – Synapse Design

== Charts ==
Chart performance for The Penance and the Patience
Chart (2021)	Peak position
Australia Independent (AIR)	4
