= Through Art We Are All Equals =

Studio album by Slaves
- Released: June 24, 2014
- Recorded: 2014
- Studio: Sacramento, California
- Genre: Post-hardcore
- Length: 41:09
- Label: Artery
- Producers: Kris Crummett, Jonny Craig (additional)

Slaves chronology
Through Art We Are All Equals (2014)	Routine Breathing (2015)

Singles from Through Art We Are All Equals
- 1. "The Fire Down Below" Released: April 22, 2014; 2. "The Upgrade, Pt. II" Released: May 14, 2014; 3. "Starving for Friends" Released: May 26, 2014; 4. "My Soul Is Empty and Full of White Girls" Released: July 9, 2014

Professional ratings
Review scores
Source	Rating
Cryptic Rock	4/5
Punk News	1.5/5 stars

Through Art We Are All Equals is the debut album by the American post-hardcore band Slaves released June 24, 2014 through Artery Recordings. The lead single "The Fire Down Below" was released on April 22, 2014, on YouTube. On May 14, the band released "The Upgrade, Pt. II" as the second single from the album. The third single "Starving for Friends", featuring Vic Fuentes of Pierce the Veil was released on May 26. The album was produced by Kris Crummett. It's the only album to feature bassist Jason Mays who left the band on May 30 prior to the album's release.

== Background ==
On March 3, 2014, Jonny Craig announced that he would be signed to Artery Recordings with his band, Slaves. A video was uploaded on the same day of Craig and the band recording the album in Sacramento, California on Artery Recordings' official YouTube channel. The band released their first single, "The Fire Down Below" on April 22. Kris Crummett was announced to be the producer for the album and the track listing and album art cover was released soon after. It was confirmed that the album's featured guests would include Tyler Carter of metalcore band Issues, Craig's sister Natalie Craig, Kyle Lucas, and Vic Fuentes of post-hardcore band Pierce the Veil. Jonny Craig confirmed that the album's release will not be involved with his former label, Rise Records. On May 13, 2014, the band confirmed that they would tour on the All Stars Tour. The singles "The Upgrade Pt. II" and "Starving for Friends", featuring Vic Fuentes, were released as singles on May 14 and May 26, respectively, in the iTunes Store. The title "There Is Only One God and His Name Is Death" is a quote from Game of Thrones.

== Track listing ==
All tracks are written by Slaves

No.	Title	Length
1.	"The Fire Down Below"	4:05
2.	"This Is You Throwing in the Towel"	3:24
3.	"The Young and Beyond Reckless" (featuring Tyler Carter of Issues)	3:16
4.	"My Soul Is Empty and Full of White Girls"	3:58
5.	"Those Who Stand for Nothing, Fall for Everything"	3:48
6.	"The Hearts of Our Young" (featuring Natalie Craig)	4:24
7.	"There Is Only One God and His Name Is Death"	4:07
8.	"The King and the Army That Stands Behind Him" (featuring Kyle Lucas)	3:12
9.	"Ashes.Dust.Smoke.Love.Stars.The One."	3:11
10.	"The Upgrade, Pt. II"	3:40
11.	"Starving for Friends" (featuring Vic Fuentes of Pierce the Veil)	4:04
Total length:		41:09

== Personnel ==
Slaves

- Jonny Craig - lead vocals, piano
- Alex Lyman - lead guitar
- Christopher Kim - rhythm guitar, percussion
- Jason Mays - bass
- Tai Wright - drums, percussion

Additional musicians

- Tyler Carter of Issues - vocals on "The Young and Beyond Reckless"
- Natalie Craig - vocals on "The Hearts of Our Young"
- Kyle Lucas - vocals on "The King and the Army That Stands Behind Him"
- Vic Fuentes of Pierce the Veil - vocals on "Starving for Friends"

Production

- Produced, mixed, mastered and engineered by Kris Crummett
- Vocal engineered by Kris Crummett
- Additional vocal engineered on "Starving for Friends" by Dan Korneff
- Additional production by Jonny Craig
- A&R by Eric Rushing
- Illustrations and layout by Glenn Thomas
