= Myka Relocate =

Defunct American metalcore band

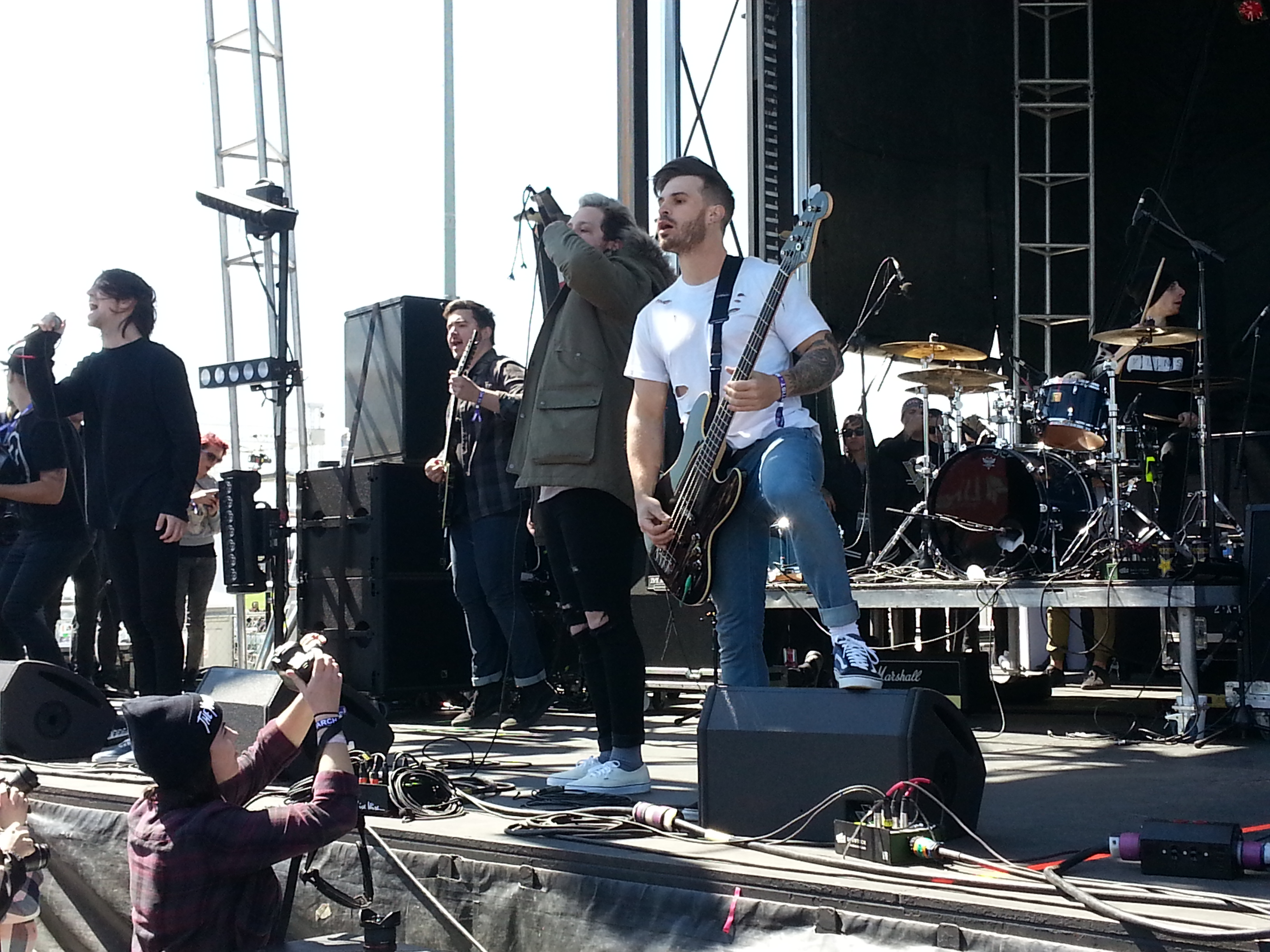
- Myka Relocate performing in 2016

Background information
- Origin: Lafayette, Louisiana, U.S.
- Genres: Metalcore, post-hardcore
- Years active: 2007–2020, 2025
- Labels: Artery, Razor & Tie
- Past members: Austin Doré; Dylan LeBlanc; Josh Peltier; John Ritter; Michael Swank; Sam Albarado; Scott Badon; Luke Burleigh; Garrett Hawkins; Aaron Robertson
- Website: Myka Relocate on Facebook

Myka Relocate were an American metalcore band formed in Lafayette, Louisiana, in 2007, and later based in Houston, Texas. The band released three studio albums, Self Portrait as a Frozen Father, Lies to Light the Way and The Young Souls. It performed at the annual South by So What?! music festival from 2012 to 2015 and at the 2016 SO WHAT! Music Festival. The band combined electronic elements, guttural screaming, and pop vocals.

== History ==
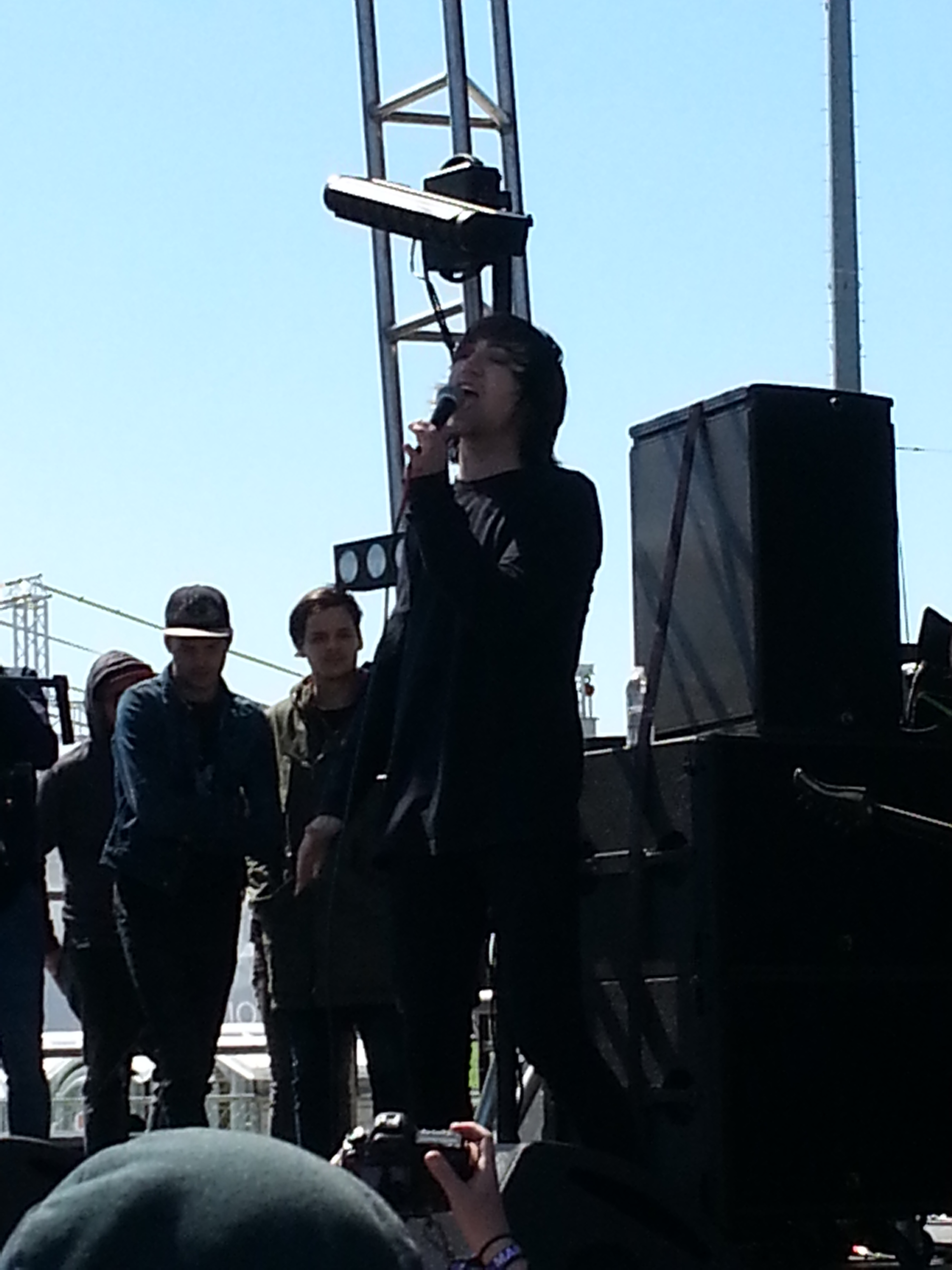
Michael Swank

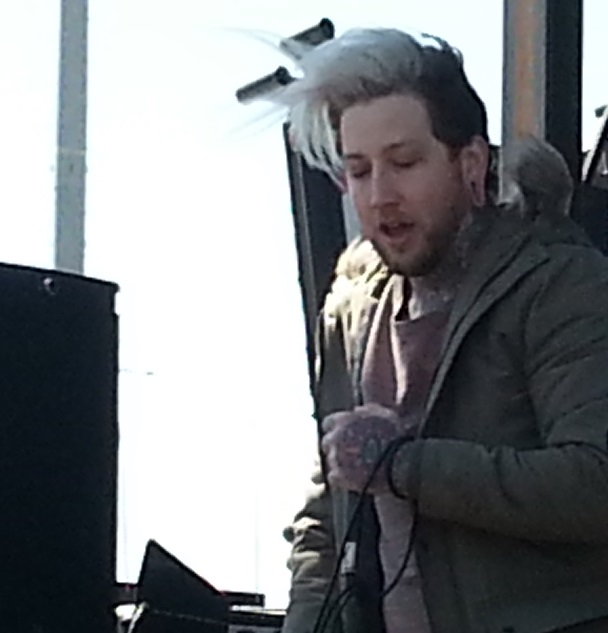
John Ritter

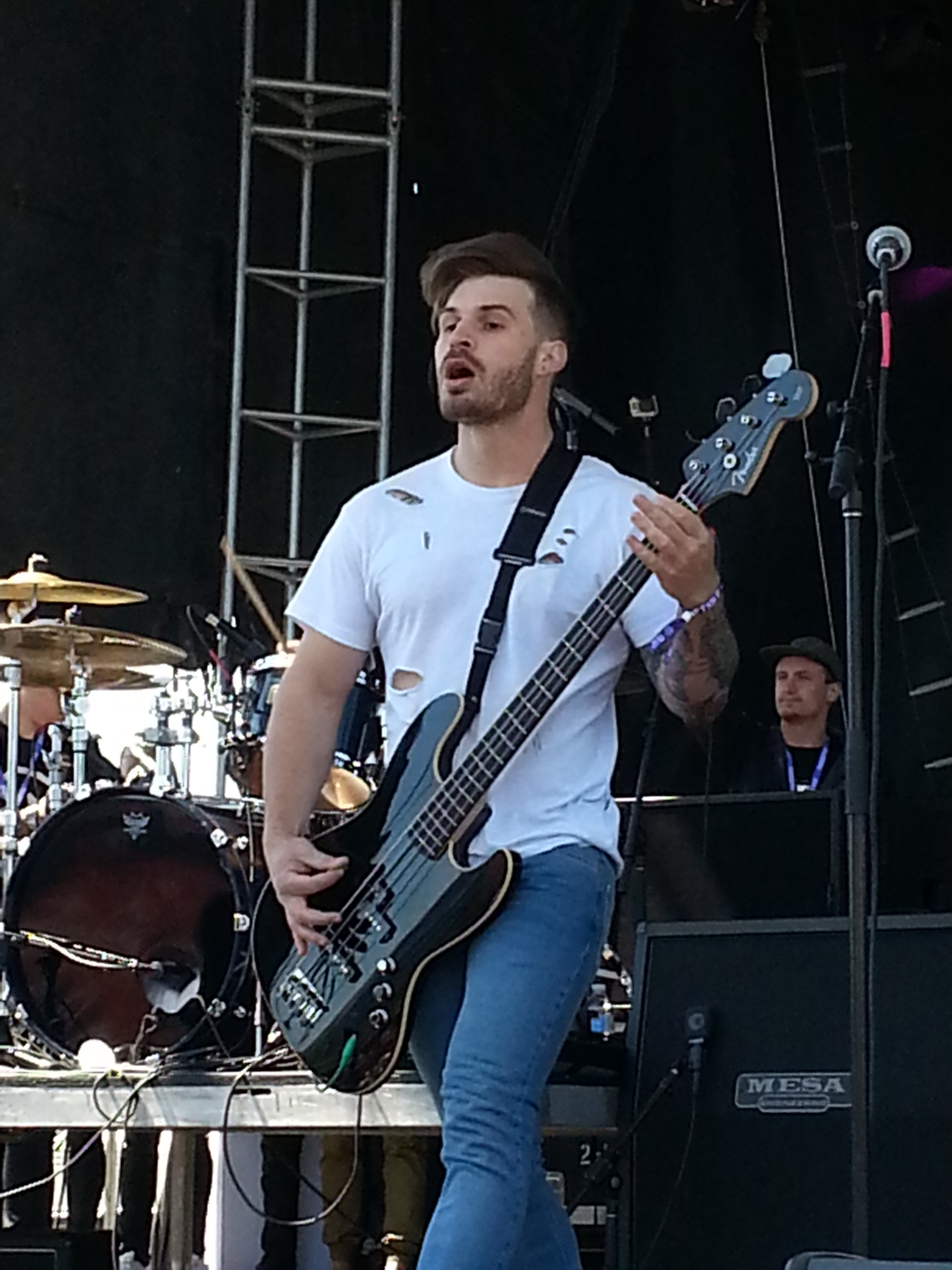
Josh Peltier

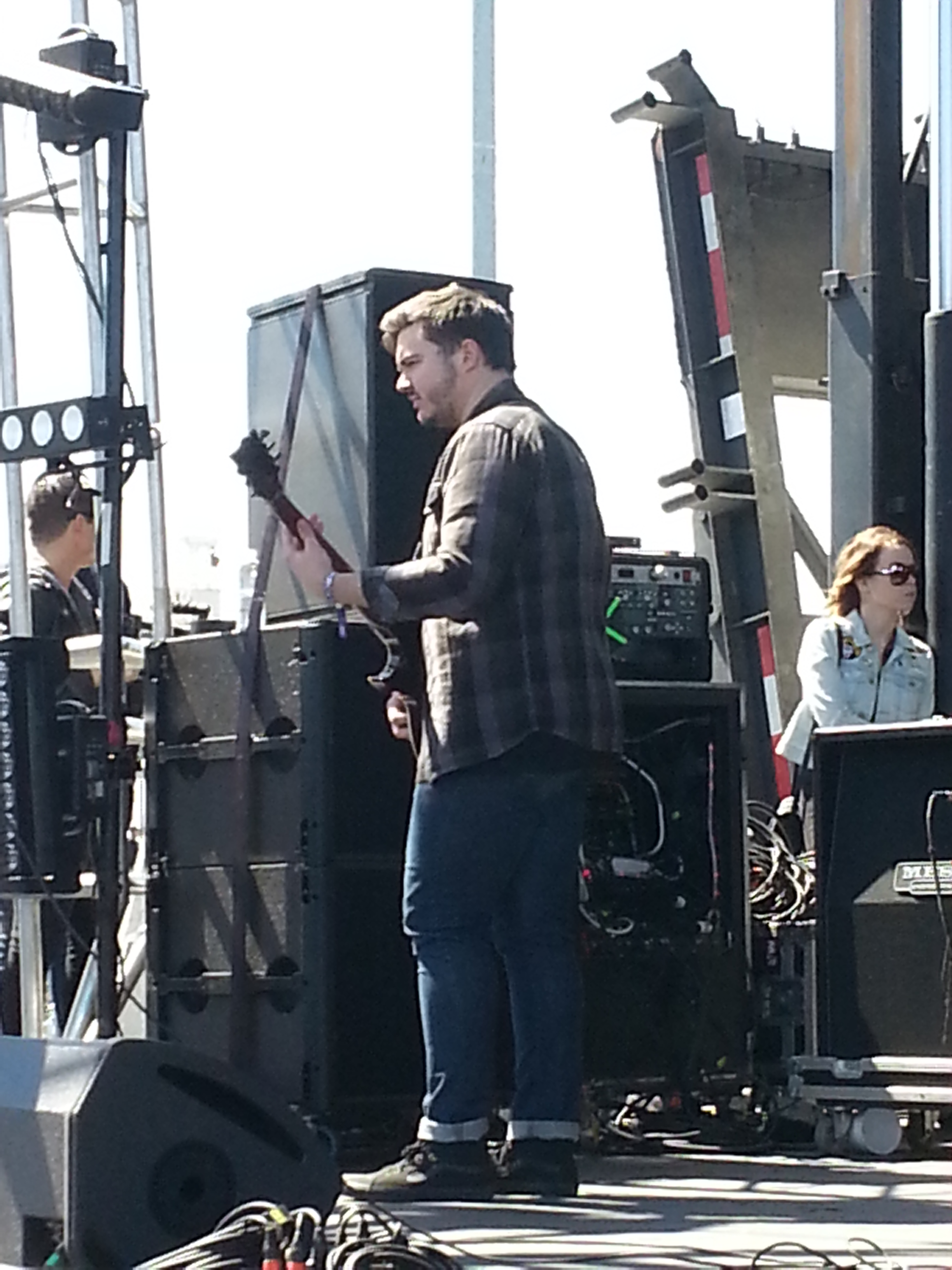
Austin Doré

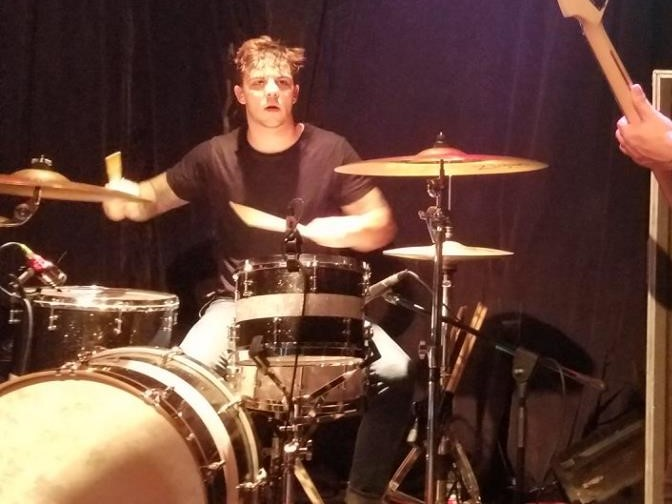
Dylan LeBlanc

In 2007, Austin Doré, Sam Albarado and Garrett Hawkins started Myka Relocate in Lafayette, Louisiana. Shortly after, the band enlisted Tori Guidry at lead guitar. The band had multiple short-term bass players (Trevor Granger, Jack Taylor), before longtime bassist Luke Burleigh joined the band in 2008. The band self-released an album in the summer of 2008 called Self Portrait as a Frozen Father.

At this time the band's genre was post-hardcore. Shortly after the release of Self Portrait, Tori Guidry left the band. The band operated as a four piece consisting of Hawkins (vocals), Doré (guitars), Burleigh (bass), and Albarado (drums) for the next eighteen months after Guidry's departure. On June 26, 2009 the band self-released an EP called ...and of Monsters.

In late 2009 vocalist Garrett Hawkins posted a bulletin on MySpace announcing his departure from the band.

The band announced new vocalist Scott Badon and rhythm guitarist Josh Peltier and released one song titled "Take it Easy Mountain Face" to their MySpace page in 2010, but shortly after the band was without a vocalist again.

After finding a loyal following in Lafayette, the band changed their base of operations to Houston, Texas (to draw a larger following) in 2010, adding vocalists John Ritter and Michael Swank and adopted a metalcore sound.

The band was named after a phrase used in video game Call of Duty, in which a voice shouts "Sniper, Relocate". The band decided to change the pronunciation of the first word to "/ˈmaɪkə/", but decided to spell the word as "Myka".

In early 2013, Albarado and the group parted ways, with Aaron Robertson taking over on percussion. In July of that year, the band signed with Artery Recordings, a label distributed by Razor & Tie. The ensemble then worked with producer Cameron Mizell at Chango Studios to record their debut studio album. In mid-September, the band announced the title of their album as Lies to Light the Way while publishing "Doublespeak", the first single from the album. Preceded five days earlier by a full album stream, the work was released on October 29, 2013, reaching No.22 on Top Heatseekers.

To start off 2014, the band released their first music video entitled "Something to Dream About". In early 2015, the group published an acoustic version of the tune to accompany their music video.

On September 24, 2015, the band announced that their second album The Young Souls would be published in late October. That same day, the group released "New Again", the first single from the record. Throughout the month of October, the ensemble released three consecutive singles from the album. "Cold Hearts", the second single from the album, was released on October 8 with "Bring You Home" being published one week later and "Damage" presented the week following. On the Facebook page for the ensemble, the band announced a music video for "Nerve", released on February 24, 2016.

In early 2016, bassist Luke Burleigh, drummer Aaron Robertson and the band parted ways. From March until April 2016, the group toured the United States with Slaves, Capture the Crown, Outline in Color and Conquer Divide with "Scream Out Fest" at AgeHa (Shinkiba Studio Coast) in Shinkiba, Japan hosting the ensemble in early June 2016.

In late June and early July 2016, the ensemble performed throughout the United States on The Young Souls Tour, the first national headline circuit for the group. Light Up The Sky and Out Came The Wolves joined as supporting acts.

In late July 2016, the band indicated through their Facebook page that they plan to write new music soon.

In early February 2017, the ensemble toured Texas, performing shows in Dallas, Austin and Houston.

In late 2017, the band went on hiatus.

On October 30, 2020 vocalist Michael Swank held an Instagram live in which he announced the status of the band to be broken up.

In 2021, Swank joined American rock band Foxera.

On August 5, 2024, the band announced they'll be reuniting for two special shows at Whiskey Go Go in Los Angeles, California on January 12, 2025 and January 13, 2025 where they'll be performing their albums "Lies To Light The Way" and "The Young Souls" in full on each date respectively.

== Members ==
Former

- Tori Guidry – guitars (2007–2008)
- Jack Taylor – bass (2007–2008)
- Trevor Granger – bass, unclean vocals (2007)
- Garrett Hawkins – lead vocals (2007–2009)
- Scott Miller Badon – lead vocals (2010)
- Sam Albarado – drums, percussion (2007–2013)
- Luke Burleigh – bass (2008–2016)
- Aaron Robertson – drums, percussion (2013–2016)
- Austin Doré – lead guitar, programming, backing vocals (2007–2020), rhythm guitar (2007–2009, 2016–2020)
- Josh Peltier – rhythm guitar (2009–2016) bass (2016–2020)
- John D. Ritter – lead unclean vocals (2010–2020)
- Michael Swank – lead clean vocals (2010–2020)
- Dylan LeBlanc – drums, percussion (2016–2020)

Timeline

== Discography ==
=== Studio albums ===
Year	Album details	Peak chart positions			
Year	Album details	US Heat.	US Ind.	US Hard Rock	US Rock
2008	Self-Portrait as a Frozen Father: Released: July 8, 2008; Label: Independent	—	—	—	—
2013	Lies to Light the Way: Released: October 29, 2013; Label: Artery Recordings, Razor & Tie, Relativity Records; Formats: CD, DI	22	—	—	—
2015	The Young Souls: Released: October 30, 2015; Label: Artery Recordings; Formats: CD, DI	7	36	16	48
"—" denotes a release that did not chart.

=== Extended plays ===
- ...And of Monsters (2009)
- Myka, Relocate (2012)

=== Singles ===
- "Darker" (2012)
- "Doublespeak" (2013)
- "New Again" (2015)
- "Cold Hearts" (2015)
- "Bring You Home" (2015)
- "Damage" (2015)

=== Music videos ===
- "Something To Dream About" (2014)
- "Useless" [featuring Tyler Smith] (2014)
- "Playing It Safe" [featuring Jonny Craig] (2014)
- "Nerve" (2016)
