= Beautiful Death =

Studio album by Slaves
- Released: February 16, 2018
- Recorded: 2016–17
- Studio: Grey Area Studios (Los Angeles, California)
- Genre: Post-hardcore; alternative rock; R&B; alternative metal
- Length: 37:33
- Label: The Orchard; SBG
- Producer: Erik Ron

Slaves chronology
Routine Breathing (2015)	Beautiful Death (2018)	To Better Days (2020)

Singles from Beautiful Death
- 1. "I'd Rather See Your Star Explode" Released: January 20, 2017; 2. "True Colors" Released: November 16, 2017; 3. "Patience Is the Virtue" Released: January 2, 2018; 4. "I Know A Lot of Artists" Released: January 26, 2018; 5. "The Pact" Released: February 16, 2018

Beautiful Death is the third full-length studio album by American rock band Slaves, released on February 16, 2018, by The Orchard and SBG Records. The album serves as a follow-up to the band's second studio album, Routine Breathing (2015) and is the group's first release since their departure from Artery Recordings. It was produced by Erik Ron and was recorded at Grey Area Studios in Los Angeles, California. This is the final studio album to feature founding member and lead vocalist Jonny Craig, who left the group in January 2019.

The album was supported by its lead single, "I'd Rather See Your Star Explode", which was released on January 20, 2017. The album produced four more singles, "True Colors", "Patience Is the Virtue", "I Know a Lot of Artists", and "The Pact". The band embarked on the Beautiful Death Tour in September and October 2017 in the United States.

As of February 21, 2018, the album has charted internationally in five countries on the iTunes Charts: the US (#5), Australia (#11), Canada (#22), Britain (#30) and Germany (#64).

== Background ==
Slaves released their second studio album, Routine Breathing (2015), and toured in support of the album for two years. In 2016, following the release of a music video for the song "Winter Everywhere", featuring Tilian Pearson, the video was taken down by their former label, Artery Recordings, which caused controversy between the band and label. "Our music belongs to us, and it belongs to our fans,” they wrote. “Not some dude in a suit collecting every cent we generate. We have worked HARD for everything we have and it's time to take a stand against CORRUPT bullshit labels like Artery and so many alike.” In March 2016, the band's guitarist Alex Lyman announced his departure from the group following their U.S. tour with Capture the Crown, Myka Relocate, Outline In Color, and Conquer Divide. Two weeks later, Slaves revealed they would break-up. Despite this, in May 2016, the band confirmed that they did not break-up and were reuniting with a new line-up.

On January 20, 2017, the band released the single "I'd Rather See Your Star Explode". Due to sexual allegations against frontman Jonny Craig, Artery Recordings decided to part ways with Slaves. The band announced that they had signed with The Orchard and SBG Records in early 2018.

== Promotion ==
"I'd Rather See Your Star Explode" was released as the debut single off the album on January 20, 2017. A music video for the song premiered on the same day.

The second single, "True Colors", was released on November 16, 2017, along with its lyric video.

The third single, "Patience Is the Virtue", was released on January 2, 2018. A fourth single, "I Know a Lot of Artists", was released on January 26. A music video for the song "The Pact" premiered on the day of the album's release on February 16, 2018.

=== Tour ===
In support of the album, Slaves embarked on The Beautiful Death Tour, which took place from September 1 to October 1, 2017. Support for the tour included SECRETS.

== Track listing ==
No.	Title	Length
1.	"I'd Rather See Your Star Explode"	3:44
2.	"Patience Is the Virtue"	3:33
3.	"True Colors"	3:30
4.	"Let This Haunt You"	3:45
5.	"Petty Trappin'"	3:57
6.	"I Know a Lot of Artists"	3:35
7.	"Deadly Conversations"	3:46
8.	"Back to the Roots"	3:56
9.	"Warning from My Demons"	3:35
10.	"The Pact"	4:12
Total length:		37:33

== Credits and personnel ==
Slaves

- Jonny Craig – vocals, writing
- Colin Viera – bass guitar
- Weston Richmond – lead and rhythm guitar

Additionally

- Christopher M. Suitt - drums

Production

- Erik Ron – production, writing, mixing

== Charts ==
Chart (2018)	Peak position
US Billboard 200	105
