= First Temple (album) =

Studio album by Closure in Moscow
- Released: 5 May 2009
- Recorded: January–March 2009, at Interlace Audio, Portland, Oregon
- Genre: Progressive rock, psychedelic rock, alternative rock
- Label: Equal Vision; Taperjean
- Producer: Kris Crummett

Closure in Moscow chronology
| The Penance and the Patience (2008) | First Temple (2009) | Pink Lemonade (2014) |

Professional ratings
Review scores
| Source | Rating |
|---|---|
| AbsolutePunk.net | (77%) |
| EmotionalPunk | 8.5/10 stars |
| SomethingPunk | 5/5 stars |
| The Interlude | 4/5 stars |

First Temple is the debut studio album by Australian rock band Closure in Moscow, released to stores and digitally in the US on 5 May 2009. It was released digitally in Australia on 9 May and in stores on 22 May 2009, and is their first album on Equal Vision Records, following the success of their debut EP, The Penance and the Patience, in 2008. The tracks "Sweet#hart", "Kissing Cousins" and "A Night at the Spleen" have since been uploaded to the band's MySpace page.

== Track listing ==
1. "Kissing Cousins" – 4:01
2. "Reindeer Age" – 3:54
3. "Sweet#hart" – 4:05
4. "Vanguard" – 3:50
5. "A Night at the Spleen" – 3:57
6. "I'm a Ghost of Twilight" – 3:59
7. "Permafrost" – 3:38
8. "Deluge" – 3:51
9. "Afterbirth" – 3:36
10. "Arecibo Message" – 4:26
11. "Couldn't Let You Love Me" – 1:07
12. "Had to Put It in the Soil" – 4:27

== Release history ==
| Country | Date | Label | Format | Catalogue # |
|---|---|---|---|---|
| United States | 5 May 2009 | Equal Vision | CD, download | 80168 |
| Australia | 9 May 2009 | Taperjean Music | Download | TJM020 |
| Australia | 22 May 2009 | Taperjean Music | CD | TJM020 |
