= Lies to Light the Way =

Studio album by Myka Relocate
- Released: October 29, 2013
- Recorded: 2013
- Studio: Chango Studios
- Genre: Metalcore
- Length: 40:21
- Label: Artery Recordings
- Producer: Cameron Mizell

Myka Relocate chronology
Self Portrait as a Frozen Father (2008)	Lies to Light the Way (2013)	The Young Souls (2015)

Lies to Light the Way is the second studio album by American metalcore band Myka Relocate. Released on 29 October 2013, the work was produced by Cameron Mizell and published by Artery Recordings. The album ranked No.22 on Top Heatseekers.

== Background ==
In early 2013, after parting ways with percussionist Sam Albarado, the band recruited Aaron Robertson to perform on drums. Midway through the year the ensemble was signed by Artery Recordings.

== Composition ==
Vocalist John Ritter refers to debut single "Doublespeak" as "a big middle finger to those people" who caused the ensemble to be "dragged in the dirt in the past and played like chess pieces". He goes on to say that "if they didn't do what they did, we wouldn't be as aggressive in making this happen", and that this is the meaning of album title "Lies to Light the Way". The vocalist then described "Useless" as "one of [their] meanest songs", alluding to "rock stars" and "people who take their positions for granted, exploit their fame, and have overbearing egos".

== Promotion ==
In September 2013, the title of their album was announced as Lies to Light the Way. At that time, "Doublespeak" was broadcast as the first single from the album. To promote the album, the group toured in late 2013 with This or the Apocalypse, Honour Crest and Tear Out the Heart on The Browning's "The Hypernova Tour".

On 24 October 2013, a full stream of the studio album was made available to the public. At the beginning of 2014, the band published "Something to Dream About", the very first music video from the ensemble followed by a live music video of "Useless". In the latter part of that year, a music video for "Playing It Safe" along with a lyric video for "Admitting The Truth" were published. In early 2015, the group published an acoustic version of their debut music video.

== Critical reception ==
Carl Schulz of The Snapper newspaper at Millersville University describes the album as being "praised for its distinctive clashes between gripping unclean vocals provided by John Ritter, bone-crushing breakdowns, and sugary-sweet clean vocals". The Door night club in Deep Ellum describes the work as "twelve tracks that segue from gnashing technical guitars into immediately irresistible refrains", going on to say that "Electronic flourishes color the sound at points, while every element falls into an impenetrable groove reminiscent of Deftones or Sleeping with Sirens". Ryan De Freitas of DEAD PRESS! likened the group to Memphis May Fire and Kellin Quinn portraying the tunes as "pretty infectious when it’s at its best and with a bit of refining and more sporadic usage" continuing on to state that "Some of the better [tracks] could easily reach [anthemic heights]". Kriston McConnell of Under the Gun Review however, compared Swank's vocals to those of Andy Leo from Crown The Empire.

== Track listing ==
All tracks are written by Myka Relocate.

No.	Title	Writer(s)	Length
1.	"Revolve"		1:11
2.	"Dead Ties"		3:09
3.	"Something to Dream About"		3:44
4.	"The Inevitable"		3:45
5.	"Natural Separation"		3:03
6.	"Useless" (feat. Tyler Smith)		4:24
7.	"Doublespeak"		3:14
8.	"Playing It Safe" (feat. Jonny Craig)		3:44
9.	"The Answer"	Drew Fulk / Myka Relocate	3:34
10.	"Dry Spell"	Drew Fulk / Myka Relocate	3:39
11.	"Cold War"	Drew Fulk / Myka Relocate	3:08
12.	"Admitting the Truth"		3:46
Total length:			40:21

== Personnel ==
- John Ritter – unclean vocals
- Michael Swank – clean vocals
- Luke Burleigh – bass
- Austin Doré – guitar, programming
- Josh Peltier – guitar
- Aaron Robertson – drums

== Chart history ==
Chart (2013)	Peak position
Heatseekers Albums	22
