= Find What You Love and Let It Kill You (Jonny Craig EP) =

EP by Jonny Craig
- Released: September 24, 2013
- Genre: R&B
- Length: 28:43 (original version); 32:37 (special edition); 39:49 (Australian edition)
- Label: Self-Released
- Producer: Captain Midnite

Jonny Craig chronology
| A Dream is a Question You Don't Know How to Answer (2009) | Find What You Love and Let It Kill You (2013) | The Blueprint for Going in Circles (2015) |

Find What You Love and Let It Kill You is a studio EP by Jonny Craig released on September 24, 2013.

== Background ==
On February 12, 2013 Jonny Craig announced a crowd funding campaign for the crowd funding of a new EP. Shortly after on March 24, 2013 he met his goal of $20,000. On May 14, Jonny Craig posted the first song from the EP, accompanied with video; 'The Lives We Live' The album artwork and track listing were revealed on September 9.

On November 26, 2013 a special edition of the album was released on iTunes, which added the new song 'Ground Pound Sex Slave (From the Future) featuring guest vocals from two fans as part of the indiegogo campaign.

More recently, on March 11, 2014 a second video was released for 'Istillfeelher Pt.5', which featured rapper Kyle Lucas. This song also appears on The Blueprint for Going in Circles, a compilation album from Jonny Craig, Kyle Lucas, and Captain Midnite.

== Track listing ==
| No. | Title | Length |
|---|---|---|
| 1. | "The Lives We Live" | 4:06 |
| 2. | "Istillfeelher Pt.5 (Featuring Kyle Lucas)" | 4:01 |
| 3. | "(Diamond)" | 3:32 |
| 4. | "The Open Letter" | 3:32 |
| 5. | "Jesus Died for You.. Not Me" | 5:35 |
| 6. | "The Upgrade" | 4:13 |
| 7. | "The Ratchet Blackout" | 3:44 |
| Total length: | | 28:43 |

Special Edition
| No. | Title | Length |
|---|---|---|
| 8. | "Ground Pound Sex Slave (From the Future)" | 3:54 |
| Total length: | | 32:37 |

Australian Edition
| No. | Title | Length |
|---|---|---|
| 8. | "Ground Pound Sex Slave (From the Future)" | 3:54 |
| 9. | "Nobody Ever Will" | 4:03 |
| 10. | "House Of War" | 3:19 |
| Total length: | | 39:49 |
