= Routine Breathing =

Studio album by Slaves
- Released: August 21, 2015
- Recorded: 2015
- Studio: Chango Studios, Lake Mary, Florida
- Genre: Post-hardcore
- Length: 51:09
- Label: Artery
- Producer: Cameron Mizell

Slaves chronology
Through Art We Are All Equals (2014)	Routine Breathing (2015)	Beautiful Death (2018)

Singles from Routine Breathing
- 1. "Burning Our Morals Away" Released: July 10, 2015; 2. "Death Never Lets Us Say Goodbye" Released: July 23, 2015; 3. "Drowning in My Addiction" Released: August 16, 2015; 4. "Running Through the !6! With My SOUL" Released: 2015

Routine Breathing is the second album by American post-hardcore band Slaves. The album was released on August 21, 2015. This is the first album to feature Weston Richmond on rhythm guitar and Colin Viera on bass. It is the last album by the band released under the Artery Recordings label.

== Background ==
On January 7, 2015, the band uploaded a picture to their Facebook page claiming that they were starting work on their second album, which was followed, on July 5, with a track listing featuring 15 songs.

The album was scheduled for an October release date, but was pushed to August 21, 2015. On July 9, the debut single "Burning Our Morals Away" from their second album was leaked via leak websites across the web, and July 10, the single was released. On July 23, the band released the second single, "Death Never Let Us Say Goodbye" after the song had leaked. On August 16, the band released the third single "Drowning In My Addiction" with a lyric video. The track ""One God"" is an acoustic rendition of the song "There Is Only One God and His Name Is Death" from their debut album, Through Art We Are All Equals.

== Track listing ==
No.	Title	Length
1.	"Drowning in My Addiction"	2:49
2.	"As the Light Cracks the Foundation"	3:22
3.	"The Hearts of Our Broken" (featuring Garret Rapp of The Color Morale)	3:17
4.	"Burning Our Morals Away"	3:12
5.	"Who Saves the Savior" (featuring Spencer Chamberlain of Underoath and Sleepwave)	4:21
6.	"Share the Sunshine Young Blood, Pt. 2" (featuring Kyle Lucas)	3:13
7.	"Death Never Lets Us Say Goodbye"	3:19
8.	"Running Through the !6! With My Soul"	3:57
9.	"Winter Everywhere" (featuring Tilian Pearson of Dance Gavin Dance)	3:28
10.	"Why Fit in When You Can Stand Out?"	3:10
11.	"Shoutout to All My Toasters"	3:21
12.	"Is Robbing Your Friends Supposed to Be Tight?"	3:01
13.	""One God""	4:21
14.	"We Are so Michelle Branch"	3:35
15.	"If Only We Could Change"	2:43
Total length:		51:09

== Personnel ==
Slaves

- Jonny Craig – lead vocals
- Alex Lyman – lead guitar
- Weston Richmond – rhythm guitar
- Colin Viera – bass
- Tai Wright – drums

Additional personnel

- Garret Rapp – guest vocals on "The Hearts of Our Broken"
- Spencer Chamberlain – guest vocals on "Who Saves the Savior"
- Kyle Lucas – guest vocals on "Share the Sunshine Young Blood, Pt. 2"
- Tilian Pearson – guest vocals on "Winter Everywhere"

Production

- Cameron Mizell – producer, engineer
- Alex Lyman – producer, engineer
- Craig Baker – engineer
- Joel Pack – engineer
- Ricky Orozco – assistant engineer
