= The Blueprint for Going in Circles =

Compilation album by Jonny Craig, Kyle Lucas and Captain Midnite
- Released: January 27, 2015
- Genre: R&B, hip hop, alternative R&B, soul
- Length: 41:05
- Label: Artery Recordings
- Producer: Captain Midnite

Jonny Craig chronology
Find What You Love and Let It Kill You (2013)	The Blueprint for Going in Circles (2015)	The Le Cube Sessions (2015)

Kyle Lucas chronology
Fear and Loathing in Marietta (2014)	The Blueprint for Going in Circles (2015)	Marietta Georgia The Album (2015)

Captain Midnite chronology
All This Will Fade (2012)	The Blueprint for Going in Circles (2015)

The Blueprint for Going in Circles is a collaborative compilation album by Jonny Craig, Kyle Lucas, and Captain Midnite released on January 27, 2015 via Gold Standard/Artery Recordings. The album features seven songs previously released over the past three years, and four new songs.

== Background ==
Jonny Craig used the name 'The Blueprint for Going in Circles' for his second solo album since 2011.

'Worth it' appeared on Kyle Lucas' mixtape 'It's Always Sunny in Marietta 2', which was released On April 11, 2012. Just 9 days later, on April 20, 2012, the group posted 'Party And The Dream'. 'Istillfeelher Pt.5' is a track taken from Jonny Craig's second solo release, 'Find What You Love and Let It Kill You', which was released on September 24, 2013. On April 30, 2014 unfinished demo versions of 'WE BLACK HEARTS BEAR THE CROSS', 'Give me a museum and i'll fill it.', 'Destiny, The two way street.', and 'Detroit winters.' were revealed, notably without Kyle Lucas' verses, and also with different names ('Empty California Winters', 'Burning Bridges', 'Fake Love', and 'Attention', respectively).

The album was announced on November 26, 2014, as well as a 26-day tour sharing the same name as the album. Shortly after on December 2, 2014 'WE BLACK HEARTS BEAR THE CROSS' was released in full, complemented by a lyric video.

== Track listing ==
No.	Title	Length
1.	"WE BLACK HEARTS BEAR THE CROSS."	4:57
2.	"Nightmares"	4:42
3.	"Burn Baby Burn"	3:32
4.	"Destiny, The two way street."	3:26
5.	"Istillfeelher Pt.5"	4:00
6.	"ATTENTION! Drifters!"	3:42
7.	"Give me a museum and i’ll fill it."	4:06
8.	"Peopleinhellwanticewater(interlude)"	2:34
9.	"Worth It"	3:29
10.	"Party And The Dream"	3:24
11.	"Detroit Winters."	3:18
Total length:		41:05
