= A Dream Is a Question You Don't Know How to Answer =

A Dream is a Question You Don't Know How to Answer

Studio album by Jonny Craig
- Released: August 18, 2009
- Recorded: Early May & Mid-June 2009 Interlace Recording Studios in Portland, Oregon
- Genre: Alternative rock
- Length: 32:24
- Label: Rise
- Producer: Kris Crummett

Jonny Craig chronology
A Dream is a Question You Don't Know How to Answer (2009)	Find What You Love and Let It Kill You (2013)

A Dream is a Question You Don't Know How to Answer is the debut studio album by Canadian recording artist Jonny Craig, released on August 18, 2009, via Rise Records.

== Background ==
On July 13, Jonny Craig posted two songs from his solo album on his Myspace; "I Still Feel Her, Part III" and "Children of Divorce".

On July 16, Jonny Craig Posted 3rd song, Called '7 AM, 2 Bottles And The Wrong Road' from his solo album.

An update on the track listing on July 27 revealed that The Pain Loss did not make the final cut for the album. The album leaked on August 13, 2009.

The album peaked at number 12 on the Billboard Top Heatseekers chart and 42 on the Top Independent Albums.

Recently, the music video for I Still Feel Her, Part III was released. It was filmed by producer Robby Starbuck. The music video features Pierce the Veil members Tony Perry on bass guitar and Mike Fuentes on drums. Also, Matt Mingus and Jon Mess from Dance Gavin Dance, and Tyler McElhaney and Noah Slifka from In Fear and Faith are featured as cameos.

On February 25, 2010, his music video for Children of Divorce was released. The video was filmed by producer Robby Starbuck.

== Track listing ==
All tracks are written by Kris Crummett and Jonny Craig.

No.	Title	Length
1.	"So Many of Us Hide Our Black Hearts"	1:16
2.	"Istillfeelher Part III"	3:22
3.	"What I Would Give to Be Australian"	4:07
4.	"I've Been Hearing That You're Freaky"	3:47
5.	"7 AM, 2 Bottles and the Wrong Road"	4:03
6.	"The Garbage Pail Kid Gang Bang"	3:41
7.	"Taking Time for All the Wrong Things"	3:22
8.	"No Matter How Hard I Dig, They Always See Right Through Me"	2:01
9.	"I'm Jonny Craig, Bitch, and I Drive in Reverse!"	2:52
10.	"Children of Divorce"	3:59
Total length:		32:24

== Personnel ==
As listed on the liner notes

- Jonny Craig – vocals, piano
- Kris Crummett – guitars, bass, drums, keyboards, producer, engineer, mixer, mastering
- Stephan Hawkes – guitars
- Jeff Bond – guitar on tracks 4, 7, 9, 10
- Michael Barrett – guitar on track 3
- Robbie Dressler – bass on tracks 2, 3, 9
- Josh Northcutt – drums on tracks 2, 3, 4, 9
- Allison Green – additional vocals on track 3

The album artwork was done by Vasily Kafanov who also worked on The Smashing Pumpkins album Machina/The Machines of God, as well as every full-length album by indie/post-hardcore band mewithoutYou.

== Title ==
The title of the album is paraphrased from a quote said by Gillian Anderson as Dana Scully in an episode of The X-Files entitled "Paper Hearts". A nearly identical instance of this quote is spoken by David Duchovny as Fox Mulder in the episode "Aubrey".

== Uses in other media ==
Rapper Bizzy Bone samples the main chorus of "I Still Feel Her Pt. 3" for the song "Bottled Up Like Smoke", featured on his studio album Crossroads: 2010.
