= Pink Lemonade (album) =

Studio album by Closure in Moscow
- Released: 9 May 2014
- Genre: Alternative rock; art rock; progressive rock; psychedelic rock; experimental rock; funk rock
- Length: 60:32
- Label: Sabretusk

Closure in Moscow chronology
First Temple (2009)	Pink Lemonade (2014)	Soft Hell (2023)

Pink Lemonade is the second studio album by Australian rock band Closure in Moscow. It was released on 9 May 2014. The track "The Church of the Technochrist" was released as a single in late 2013.

== Track listing ==
1. "The Fool" – 1:33
2. "Pink Lemonade" – 8:14
3. "Neoprene Byzantine" – 3:54
4. "Seeds of Gold" – 3:41
5. "That Brahmatron Song" – 9:30
6. "Dinosaur Boss Battle" – 6:20
7. "Mauerbauertraurigkeit" – 7:25
8. "The Church of the Technochrist" – 6:46
9. "Beckon Fire" – 4:02
10. "Happy Days" – 5:38
11. "ピンク レモネード" – 3:29

== Personnel ==
Closure in Moscow

- Michael Barrett - guitars, vocals, percussion, programming
- Christopher deCinque - vocals, drums, percussion
- Mansur Zennelli - guitars, vocals, erhu, percussion
- Duncan Millar - bass, vocals, percussion
- Salvatore Aidone - drums, percussion, programming

Additional musicians

- Kitty Hart - vocals (tracks 2 and 3)
- Charlie Lim - keys (track 8)
- Midori Kurihara - vocals (track 11)
- Natsuna Okuda - vocals (track 11)
- Kayo Nagasaka - vocals (track 11)
- Anne-Marie Dangerfield - vocals (tracks 11)

Production

- Tom Larkin & Closure in Moscow - producing (all tracks, except 11)
- YMCK - producing (track 11)
- Samuel Sprout, Closure in Moscow & Pete Williamson - engineering
- Andrei Eremin - mixing, additional production
- Howie Weinberg - mastering

Artwork

- Ben Clement - photography
- Yeaaah! Studio - art, layout
