= Jonny Craig =

American-Canadian singer (born 1986)

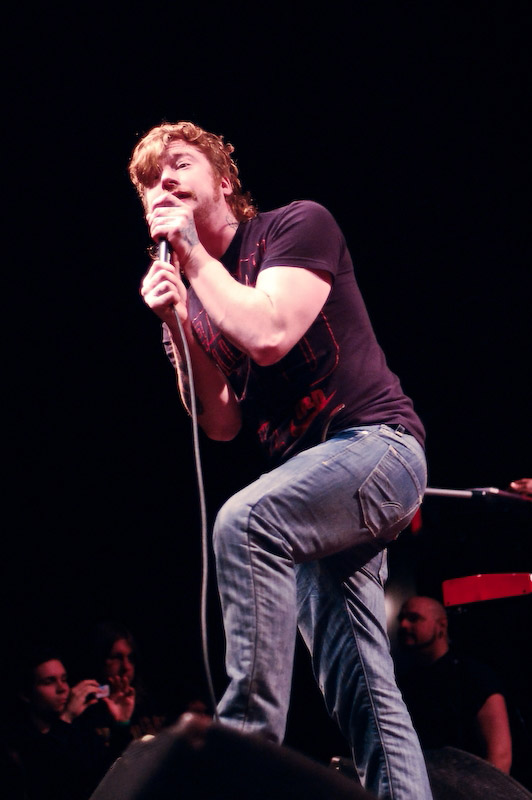
- Craig performing in 2009

Background information
- Born: Jonathan Monroe Craig; March 26, 1986 (age 40); Minot, North Dakota, U.S.
- Genres: Post-hardcore; pop-punk; experimental rock; emo; alternative rock; soul
- Occupations: Singer; songwriter
- Years active: 2000–present
- Member of: Old Flame
- Formerly of: Dance Gavin Dance; Emarosa; Ghost Runner on Third; Isles & Glaciers; Slaves; WesterHALTS

Jonathan Monroe Craig (born March 26, 1986) is an American-Canadian singer, widely recognised for his tenure as the former lead vocalist of renowned post-hardcore bands such as Dance Gavin Dance, Emarosa, and then Slaves, as well as his role as co-lead vocalist in the short-lived supergroup Isles & Glaciers. Presently, he serves as the lead vocalist for the American post-hardcore band Old Flame. As a solo artist, Craig has released two studio albums, two EPs, and a live album, garnering acclaim for his distinctive soul-based singing style.

== Early life ==
Jonathan Monroe Craig was born in Minot, North Dakota, but grew up mostly in Canada and moved back to the United States when he became an adult. In a further interview with the music blog Eat Yo Beats, Craig said "my mom made me listen to tons of shit when I was kid, everything from Michael Bolton to some weird ass Christian rock bands" and also that it was this that became his main influence, rather than gospel music. Craig cites some of his early idols as Boyz II Men and New Found Glory.

Craig was placed into his school's choir as a default elective but was ultimately kicked out. As a child, he says that he "had a hard time keeping out of trouble" and that "high school wasn't for him." He would explain later that that was the reason he left high school and attained his G.E.D, then focused on music full-time. "I just wanted an escape from a lot of the things when I was a child I guess. I just wanted to get away from a lot of the problems that I was dealing with at home and stuff", Craig states in an interview with KLSU radio as his reason for starting his path in music.

== Career ==
=== Beginnings as a musician (2000–2007) ===
After moving to the United States from Abbotsford, British Columbia, and attending high school in Washington State, Craig auditioned for bands but ultimately was not accepted into one. Craig then formed the band westerHALTS in 2000, a garage band from Tacoma, Washington. At age 15, Craig released his first known song with them titled "Change, Leisure, and Retirement" in 2001. In an Alternative Press Podcast he stated that the band was "...just something to help pay for weed, something I played over the weekends." He then joined as the lead vocalist for Tacoma-based pop-punk band Ghost Runner on Third in 2002. Craig said that he met the guitarist of Ghost Runner on Third in high school. He received positive reviews with this band's debut EP, Speak Your Dreams, released on January 4, 2005. AllMusic stated that Craig was, "the band's secret weapon, a passionate vocalist. There's not a bad track to be found here, but Craig tends to outshine his bandmates throughout."

Early on in his career with Ghost Runner On Third it has been cited that overwhelming drug problems led to his departure, as told by Dance Gavin Dance in an old blog post concerning Craig after he was kicked out of the band. Though Craig has denied the statements made, Dance Gavin Dance has not backed off from those remarks, which they explain was the reason for all the band's problems and partly for his former band Ghost Runner on Third. Dance Gavin Dance has also partially blamed guitarist Sean O'Sullivan's departure on Craig's behavior, although there were other contributing factors. Despite their past differences, both past and present members of Dance Gavin Dance have since become friends. Consider the Thief (O'Sullivan's band after Dance Gavin Dance), was also listed in Emarosa's Relativity album on the "special thanks" section of the info-booklet.

=== Dance Gavin Dance and Emarosa (2007–2012) ===
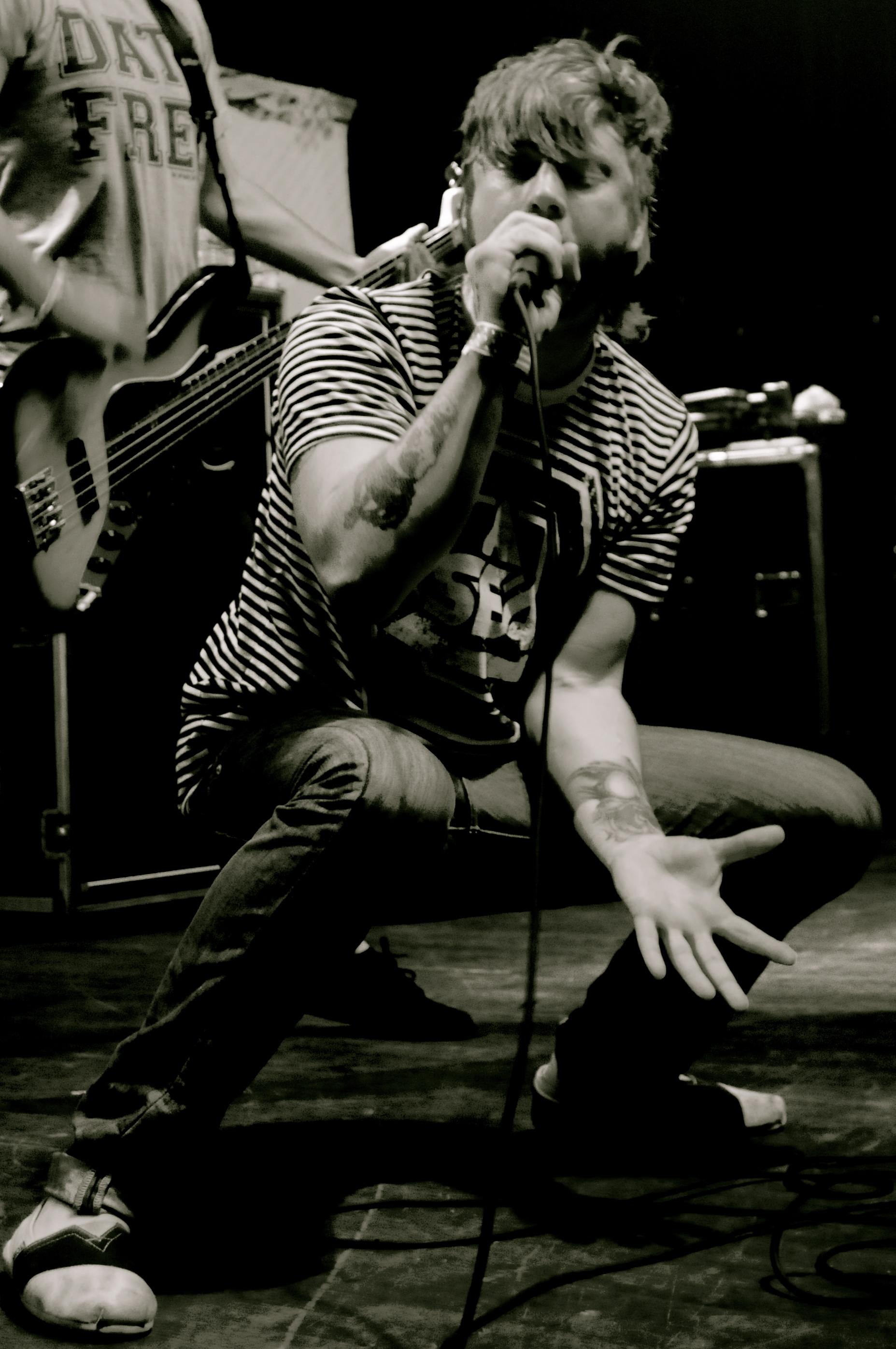
Craig with Emarosa in 2007

Craig's singing in Dance Gavin Dance's debut EP Whatever I Say Is Royal Ocean and debut full-length album Downtown Battle Mountain received positive reviews from critics. Allmusic stated that "co-frontman Jonny Craig's regularly hysterical yelping may change your mind forever."

In March 2007, it was explained that Craig came up with the name Dance Gavin Dance and had planned to name his previous band, "Ghost Runner On Third", by that name. After being kicked out of Dance Gavin Dance after the "Saints and Sinners Festival" in New Jersey, Craig immediately filled in for A Skylit Drive's Lead Vocalist Jordan Blake while he was ill. The band said at shows, and on their website, that he was not the new lead singer and the situation would only be temporary. It had been only two weeks since he was fired from his position in Dance Gavin Dance in which he joined Emarosa, who was at the time without a lead singer.

On August 18, 2010, Dance Gavin Dance parted ways with vocalist Kurt Travis. Craig returned to the band to record a new album, along with original vocalist Jon Mess. The reunited lineup would also embark on a headlining run the following spring. Craig was to remain in Emarosa as well.

The rapper Game and DJ Skee sampled Craig's vocals on the song "Heels & Dresses" from their Break Lights mixtape album, which comes from the song "The Robot With Human Hair Pt. 1." Rapper Bizzy Bone also sampled Craig's vocals on the song "Bottled Up Like Smoke" from his Crossover EP and Crossroads album, using portions of "I Still Feel Her pt. III" from his debut solo album, "A Dream Is a Question You Don't Know How to Answer."

On April 11, 2011, Emarosa publicly announced Craig's departure from the group. According to a statement made by the band, "This decision has been a hard one to make, but we feel it is in the best interest for the band going forward." "Jonny Craig" was the top trending topic on Twitter the day of the announcement.

On August 13, 2012, Craig was "kicked out" of Dance Gavin Dance once again after being "publicly scolded by the owner of Sumerian Records for multiple offenses". The news surfaced after Jonny released a statement on his personal Twitter.

=== Isles & Glaciers (2008–2010) ===
In early September 2008, Chiodos and Cinematic Sunrise vocalist Craig Owens, announced that both he and Jonny Craig would be recording an EP record by the end of the year, also mentioning Vic Fuentes and others.

On December 15, 2008, Alternative Press officially announced and revealed the name and lineup of this new project, Isles & Glaciers. The band's first EP, The Hearts of Lonely People, was produced by Casey Bates in Seattle, Washington, was reworked in April 2009 in Michigan and was released March 9, 2010.

A tweet reading in part "...and people wonder why we won't do another I & G record." was posted by Craig Owens in 2011, as the MacBook scandal was breaking.

=== Solo work (2009–present) ===
Craig released his debut solo album A Dream Is a Question You Don't Know How to Answer on August 18, 2009, through Rise Records. This is the first individual artist on the label. For promotional purposes he took press photos for the release in late 2009 with photographer Gage Young in Orlando, Florida. He further released three songs on his Myspace profile from the solo album, titled; "Istillfeelher III", "Children of Divorce" and "7 AM, 2 Bottles And The Wrong Road". Craig went on his first solo tour from November through December, supporting acts AFI, Cinematic Sunrise, and then headlining with support from Tides of Man and Sleeping With Sirens. He was headlining a tour with support from Tides of Man and Eye Alaska and will be playing The Bamboozle festival and SXSW.

Craig headlined the "White Boys With Soul" tour with Fight Fair, Breathe Electric, Mod Sun, and The Divine. Craig has also recently revealed that he is recording another solo album. In an interview at Warped Tour with MindEqualsBlown.net, Craig revealed he's attempting to work with Alex Deleon of The Cab on a B-side from his solo album. Craig announced on January 16, 2011, that he would be taking an indefinite hiatus to "pursue the filming of his documentary", stating that all his currently planned records and tours would be canceled. He later added that he would play out the tours with Dance Gavin Dance and Emarosa. On January 21, 2011, Craig announced that he would not actually be taking this hiatus, stating: "hate me all you want people I love what i do and im great at it. IM NEVER GONNA STOP. [sic]" He later stated that he was going to quit because he had been touring and recording "NON STOP" for seven years, and stated "Now i know there's nothing out in the world for me".

Craig was featured in Alternative Press's issue #288 that was released June 5, 2012.

In November 2012, Craig's personal e-mail was hacked. The hack resulted in some leaked demos circulating on the internet; Craig stated the leaked material would not be on his upcoming solo EP. From Craig's personal Twitter page: "don't trip the songs that leaked are not what my album is going to sound like. that was me just fucking around with some stuff."

Craig set up an account on Indiegogo where fans donated money to produce his upcoming EP. He also confirmed in a recent interview that he had bought out his contract with Rise Records. He released his solo EP, Find What You Love and Let It Kill You, on September 24, 2013, as an independent release.

On November 26, 2013, Craig released the special edition of Find What You Love And Let It Kill You. The special edition included a new song, featuring two top backers from his earlier Indiegogo campaign. On the same day, he released the song "Dirty Christmas".

In September 2021, Craig released his second and most recent solo album, "The Places We'll Never Be".

=== Slaves (2014–2019) ===
Artery Recordings have announced the signing of Craig's new band, Slaves, which also features members Alex Lyman and Christopher Kim (Hearts & Hands) with Tai Wright (Four Letter Lie). The band have released their debut album in the summer of 2014 via Artery. They've released a short video trailer, which features clips of the new music. The band's debut album entitled Through Art We Are All Equals, was released June 24, 2014, via Artery Recordings. The album features guest vocals from Kyle Lucas, Tyler Carter of Issues and Vic Fuentes of Pierce The Veil. Its lead single "The Fire Down Below" premiered April 22, 2014.

In early 2015, Craig released the albums The Blueprint For Going In Circles, in collaboration with singer-songwriter Kyle Lucas, and The Le Cube Sessions, respectively.

In 2017, Slaves released a new single entitled "I'd Rather See Your Star Explode" along with an accompanying music video. The group's third studio album, Beautiful Death was released on February 16, 2018. An acoustic EP called "Revision" was released on January 18, 2019.

The following Thursday, January 24, 2019, in a message posted on the band's official Twitter account, Slaves announced that they had removed Craig from the band.

During his solo tours in the US and UK in 2022, Craig announced that Slaves would reform consisting of a new line up and future music releases.

=== Old Flame (2024–present) ===
In March 2024, Craig launched his new project called Old Flame along with its debut single, "Pray".

A second single called "Thank You For The Patience" followed in May 2024.

== Personal life ==
In a 2013 acoustic set with music magazine Alternative Press, Craig explained the story behind his single "Children of Divorce." Craig claimed his then-girlfriend had become pregnant, and after an admission by Craig months later that he didn't love her, she left. He said he never heard from her again and was unable to see his child.

Craig also has a son with ex-fiancée Sydney England. They revealed their pregnancy on March 27, 2020, and announced their son's birth on July 13, 2020. Craig and England's relationship subsequently broke down following a series of intervention from the authorities, including Jonny's arrest for alleged domestic battery, and the admittance of their infant son into child protective custody.

In an interview, Craig described himself as an atheist with a Christian background. He states that all of his music is soulful and has some kind of meaning mainly because his music career began as a child singing gospel music with his church/school. Craig credits his musical talent to his grandmother (Ruth Lyons) who he says, "taught me everything I know about music, she was super Christian, super gospel. Her husband was a preacher. She taught me everything I know about music and despite the fact that I may not believe in her beliefs, I believe in what she taught me."

Craig claims to be inspired by soul music, mainly artists Aretha Franklin, Boyz II Men, and Craig David. He has also mentioned Motown acts and the band Mewithoutyou as influences. Craig has performed live covers of the songs "Cry Me a River" by Justin Timberlake, “Marvins Room” by Drake and "Fuck You" by Cee Lo Green.

Hollywood Music Magazine stated of Craig, "The guy's a legend and if you've yet to hear him sing you have been missing out."

=== Internet scam and drug-related issues ===
In February 2011, several of Craig's fans accused him of being involved in an internet scam. According to the alleged victims, Craig would claim to be selling a used MacBook through his Twitter account. After accepting an online payment on average between 600 and 800 US dollars for the product from at least 16 individuals, Craig was reported to have discontinued communication with the buyers, and the people who had purchased the MacBooks never received them. He initially denied the accusations and claimed that his Twitter had been hacked and he had no involvement. However, the following week it was announced that Craig had dropped off his current tour in Emarosa with Chiodos to enter detox in order to treat his ongoing battles with heroin addiction. Rise Records and the Artery Foundation assumed financial responsibility for the internet scam and intended to reimburse anyone who had been victimized. Tilian Pearson, formerly of Tides of Man, substituted for Craig during his absence from Dance Gavin Dance. A public apology was issued by Craig after his detox treatment was completed on March 8, 2011.

In October 2011, Craig was jailed for two counts of possession of narcotics, two counts of possession of drug paraphernalia, and one count of failure to appear on a felony charge with bail set at US$15,000. As a result of this incident, Dance Gavin Dance cancelled their upcoming tour and went on hiatus. Craig was released from jail a few weeks later and was scheduled to enter a court-ordered rehabilitation facility. His follow-up hearing was scheduled for April 30, 2012. Dance Gavin Dance went on with their tour as planned but without Craig. He completed a 30-day court-ordered detox and was released March 30, 2012.

On April 2, 2014, Craig was accused of using narcotics again by an ex-girlfriend. Craig addressed the issue in a now-deleted video where he took a drug test on screen. He is quoted saying, "just woke up to a nice surprise from the ex. So I'm headed right down to the office to prove to you guys without a doubt I'm not using and that those videos are old. She's crossed a line and needs to get it through her head that this isn't the way you deal with someone not loving you anymore. So let's go! I have nothing to hide".

On April 14, 2016, a few days following Slaves' split, Craig posted an open letter via the band's official Facebook page, confessing that he was continuing to struggle from his addiction and will seek the help he needs following his already booked solo tour. The tour consisted of the US and a few European dates with Slaves (with select members). On May 20, 2016, Craig announced on Slaves' Facebook page that the band was going through difficult times but had not broken up.

On January 24, 2019, in a Twitter post made by the official account for Slaves, it was announced that Craig had been kicked out of the band. The message said in part, "We all have struggles in our daily life, but for some, those struggles are personally and physically dangerous. It is no secret that Jonny has battled with addiction in his personal life, sometimes those battles are won, and most recently lost. It's also unfair for a band to rely on someone who just can't rely on themselves. Addiction is a disease, and we hope Jonny gets the help that he needs. Unfortunately, Jonny chose his addiction over the band and left them high & dry while checking in for their international flight while he boarded a plane back home.”

=== Sexual assault allegations ===
In 2015, Slaves were kicked off the Warped Tour after Craig allegedly bullied and sexually harassed a female merchandise worker while he was intoxicated.

In 2017, numerous ex-girlfriends accused Craig of sexual assault which led to Slaves being dropped from their record label, Artery Recordings, shortly before the scheduled release of their third album Beautiful Death.

== Discography ==
=== Bands ===
With westerHALTS

- 2001: Change, Leisure, and Retirement (self-released)

With Ghost Runner on Third

- 2005: Speak Your Dreams EP (Goodbye Blue Skies)

With Dance Gavin Dance

- 2006: Whatever I Say Is Royal Ocean EP (Rise Records)
- 2007: Downtown Battle Mountain (Rise Records)
- 2010: Live at Bamboozle 2010 (Live Nation Studios)
- 2011: Downtown Battle Mountain II (Rise Records)

With Emarosa

- 2008: Relativity (Rise Records)
- 2009: "Heads or Tails Real or Not (Acoustic)"(self-released, free download)
- 2010: Emarosa (Rise Records)

With Isles & Glaciers

- 2010: The Hearts of Lonely People EP (Equal Vision Records)
- 2014: The Hearts of Lonely People (Remixes) (Equal Vision Records)

With Slaves

- 2014: Through Art We Are All Equals (Artery Recordings)
- 2015: Routine Breathing (Artery Recordings)
- 2018: Beautiful Death (SBG Records)
- 2019: Revision (Acoustic EP) (SBG Records)

With Old Flame

- 2024: Pray (single) (SBG Records)
- 2024: Thank You for The Patience (single) (SBG Records)
- 2024: Small Town Liar (single) (SBG Records)
- 2024: Larkin (single) (SBG Records)

=== Solo ===
Studio album

- 2009: A Dream Is a Question You Don't Know How to Answer (Rise Records)
- 2021: The Places We’ll Never Be (SBG Records)

Extended play

- 2013: Find What You Love and Let It Kill You (self-released)
- 2020: Find Your Home (SBG Records)
- 2021: The Vocal Sessions (SBG Records)
- 2023: Still Searching (SBG Records)

Mixtape

- 2015: The Le Cube Sessions (self-released)

Live album

- Live at Bamboozle 2010 (Live Nation Studios, 2010)

Collaboration album

- 2015: The Blueprint for Going in Circles (with Captain Midnite and Kyle Lucas; Artery Recordings)

Singles

- 2013: "Nobody Ever Will"
- 2013: "Rhythm in My Soul"
- 2013: "House of War"
- 2013: "The Lives We Live"
- 2013: "Dirty Christmas"
- 2016: "Back to Life" (Collaboration with Tilian)
- 2020: "Under My Skin" (Collaboration with PFV)
- 2021: "Memories"
- 2021: "Going Under"
- 2021: "Sadness"
- 2021: "U.S.S. Regret"
- 2022: "Tape Six." (feat. Kyle Lucas)
- 2022: "It's Beginning to Look a Lot Like Christmas"
- 2022: "Never Back Down" (Collaboration with burnboy, 7kingZ, KEEPMYSERCRETS, Chris Dudley)
- 2023: "The One" (Collaboration with Shaker)
- 2023: "GOOSEBUMPS" (Collaboration with Shaker and KEEPMYSECRETS)

Other songs

- 2011: "Lenon Bus" and "Goddamn, I'm Good Lookin' (ft. Metasota)"
- 2012: Four unreleased songs were leaked on November; "I Belong Out There", "You're Just Another Whore", "When It Rains It Pours", and "Rhythm in My Soul"
- 2014: Four unreleased songs were leaked on April 30; "Attention", "Burning Bridges", "Empty California Winters", and "Fake Love"

Covers

- 2013: Cry Me a River - originally by Justin Timberlake
- 2013: Best I Ever Had (ft. Stephen Parrish & Kezo) - originally by Drake
- 2013: Rehab (Live Session) - originally by Amy Winehouse

== Guest appearances ==
Title	Year	Artist	Album
"Pueblo Cicada"	2008	Lower Definition	The Greatest of All Lost Arts
"Don't Jump the Shark Before You Save the Whale"	2009	Broadway	Kingdoms
"$ex, Drugz and WhiskeyHands"	2009	MikeyWhiskeyHands!	—N/a
"This Ain't a Game” (ft. Jaime Preciado)	2009	MikeyWhiskeyHands!	—N/a
"The Bridge"	2009	Falling Closer	The Sweet Release
"Bottled up like Smoke"	2010	Bizzy Bone	Crossroads
"She Makes Dirty Words Sound Pretty”	2010	Pierce the Veil	Selfish Machines (iTunes Edition)
"Our Number[s]" and “Desolate [The Conductor]”	2010	Woe, Is Me	Number[s]
"Become My Life"	2011	Mod Sun	Health, Wealth, Success & Happiness
"Lion Skin” (ft. Tyler Carter)	2011	Hands Like Houses	Ground Dweller
"Harbinger"	2012	Aerolyn	Revive
"So Captivating"	2012	The Night Survives	—N/a
"Harbinger” (Re-recorded version)	2013	Aerolyn	Revive
"Panic"	2013	Stolas	Living Creatures
"Worth It"	2013	Kyle Lucas	It's Always Sunny in Marietta 2
"Playing It Safe"	2013	Myka Relocate	Lies to Light the Way
"Criminal"	2013	Silhouette Rising	Single; Happiness 2 (2014)
"Ready for Repair” (Captain Midnite Remix ft. Kyle Lucas)	2014	SECRETS	Fragile Figures (Deluxe Edition)
"At Least You Know"	2014	I Wish We Were Robots	In Search of Sanity
"The Wave"	2014	Pavilions	The Future’s Mine to Make
"Angel"	2014	My Encore	Single; Leaving Home: Prologue (2018)
"The Runner Up"	2014	Inamorata	Inamorata
"Gemini”	2014	Whether, I	Catalyst
"Dreams Come True"	2014	Royal	—N/a
"Burdens"	2014	Reconstruct	The Throne
"Oh Dear"	2015	Secret Eyes	Comatose
"Red Gemini"	2015	Louder Than Quiet	—N/a
"The Depths"	2015	Awaken I Am	Shields and Crowns
"Veritas"	2015	Kyle Lucas	Marietta, Georgia: The Album (2015)
"Stay Alive"	2015	Murder On Her Mind	Collapse
"Reign Dance"	2016	VRSTY (as VARSITY)	—N/a
"Devils"	2016	It Lives, It Breathes	Silver Knights
"Weight"	2016	Voices	—N/a
"God Vs. Raves"	2016	Ziggy Rex	Collector's Edition
"Good Intentions"	2016	Kyle Lucas	Single; Almost Famous, Almost Broke (2017)
"Tall Tales"	2017	Affairs	—N/a
"Antagonist"	2018	High Diamond Lights	Synesthesia
"R.I.P. 2 My Youth"	2018	Kyle Ekstrom	Youngblood
"Heaven"	2019	Paul Bartolome	Single; Screaming Through The Radio (2020)
"Closure" (ft. PFV)	2019	Jackson Pierce	—N/a
"No Place Like Home" (feat. Marina)	2019	Valiant Hearts	Odyssey
"Ron Burgundy's Weekend"	2020	NYXKISS	—N/a
"I Met You In The Summer"	2020	The 12th Human	—N/a
"If You Feel Lonely"	2020	Vertigo Child	—N/a
"Betrayal"	2020	PFV	Perfect Vision
"Cadillac"	2020	Garry Bender	—N/a
"Show Me Love"	2020	Valid Point.	—N/a
"N.L.W.I.B."	2020	MOLEKEY	—N/a
"Come Along"	2020	African Americana	Founding Fathers
"Consciousness" (feat. Garrett Rapp)	2020	Boy Becomes Hero	Escape Artist
"The Life We Buried"	2021	Dog Spelled Backwards	Descension
"Dark Knights"	2021	TOKYO ROSE	Dark Knights: The Remixes
"Western Vibes" (feat. Wild the Coyote)	2022	Brian Dawe	—N/a
"Ghosts"	2022	Bean Man	—N/a
"Brave"	2022	Dorian Gray	—N/a
"Baddie" (feat. KEEPMYSECRETS)	2022	Downcast	—N/a
"KNOWHERE"	2022	Chrome Rose	—N/a
"Pretty Girl Privilege"	2023	Noirblvd	—N/a
"Delirious"	2023	daemonHeart	—N/a
