= Matt McAndrew =

American singer-songwriter (born 1990)

- Born: Matthew Brendan McAndrew; September 6, 1990 (age 35); Mount Holly, New Jersey, U.S.
- Genres: Rock; pop rock; soul; hard rock; post-hardcore; alternative rock
- Occupation: Singer–songwriter
- Instruments: Vocals; guitar
- Years active: 2010–present
- Label: Thriller Records
- Member of: Rain City Drive
- Partner: Aditi Gaur (2025-present)

Matthew Brendan McAndrew (born September 6, 1990) is an American singer-songwriter best known for his appearance in Season 7 of NBC's reality TV singing competition The Voice, where he finished as the runner-up as part of Team Adam. In January 2019, he became the lead vocalist of band Rain City Drive.

== Early life ==
McAndrew was born to Brenda (née Gordon) and Patrick McAndrew. He grew up in the small town of Barnegat Light, New Jersey, and has been writing songs and performing in bands since he was a boy. During his senior year at the Southern Regional High School in Manahawkin, New Jersey, he decided to pursue a music career. He attended the University of the Arts, Philadelphia, graduating in 2013.

== Career ==
=== Early days ===
In 2010, McAndrew started writing solo acoustic material and playing his songs at open mic nights, ice cream parlors, and bars. He worked at Bach To Rock, a national music school franchise with a location in suburban Philadelphia, teaching voice, guitar and ukulele. He self-released an album called View of The Pines on March 1, 2014.

Among other projects including Other People, and Hollow Shoulder, McAndrew gained notoriety in High School for recording and performing a Christmas themed tribute album dedicated to classmate Dwight Wagaman.

=== 2014: The Voice ===
On September 4, 2014, it was announced that McAndrew would compete in season 7 of The Voice. During his blind audition, he covered Christina Perri's "A Thousand Years". Three coaches (Adam Levine, Blake Shelton and Pharrell Williams) turned around. He chose Levine as his coach.

In the Battle rounds, McAndrew faced Ethan Butler where they sang "Yellow". McAndrew was chosen over Butler, and advanced to the Knockout rounds. McAndrew covered "Drops of Jupiter", defeated Rebekah Samarin, and advanced to the Live Playoffs. He covered The Beach Boys' "God Only Knows" and advanced through the Live shows, saved by "America's Vote". The following week, he sang Hozier's "Take Me to Church" and was saved by public voting. That night, he received the first "iTunes bonus multiplier" of the season, with his studio recording of "Take Me to Church" reaching the fifth position on the iTunes Top 200 Singles chart at the close of the voting window. The song also charted at number 92 on the Billboard Hot 100.

In top 10 he performed "Fix You" by Coldplay and was saved by America's voting. In Top 8 he covered Damien Rice's "The Blower's Daughter", which peaked at 40 on the Billboard Hot 100 and had opening sales of 92,000 downloads.

In the top 5 Live shows, McAndrew covered "Make it Rain" by Foy Vance and "I Still Haven't Found What I'm Looking For" by U2, and was voted through to the finale. During the finale the top four were given three songs to perform. McAndrew covered "Somewhere Over the Rainbow" and "Lost Stars", a duet with his coach Adam Levine. His third performance was the original song "Wasted Love", which was his first single to break the top 10 singles of the iTunes top 200 charts. A music video for "Wasted Love" was released on The Voice's YouTube channel.

On December 16, 2014, McAndrew was announced as the runner-up of season 7 of The Voice, behind Craig Wayne Boyd.

On December 25, 2014, after the result of the show was announced, Billboard showed McAndrew's "Wasted Love" at 14th on the Hot 100 with opening sales of 209,000 units sold. This is the highest mark ever achieved by a The Voice recording artist to date.

Studio version of performance reached the top 10 on iTunes

Stage	Song	Original artist	Date	Order	Result
Blind audition	"A Thousand Years"	Christina Perri	October 6, 2014	N/A	Three chairs turned Joined Team Adam
Battle Rounds (Top 48)	"Yellow" (vs. Ethan Butler)	Coldplay	October 20, 2014	N/A	Saved by Coach
Knockout Rounds (Top 32)	"Drops of Jupiter" (vs. Rebekah Samarin)	Train	November 3, 2014	N/A	Saved by Coach
Live Playoffs (Top 20)	"God Only Knows"	The Beach Boys	November 10, 2014	5	Saved by Public Vote
Live Top 12	"Take Me to Church"	Hozier	November 17, 2014	9	Saved by Public Vote
Live Top 10	"Fix You"	Coldplay	November 24, 2014	1	Saved by Public Vote
Live Top 8	"The Blower's Daughter"	Damien Rice	December 1, 2014	8	Saved by Public Vote
Live Top 5 (Semi-finals)	"Make It Rain"	Foy Vance	December 8, 2014	4	Saved by Public Vote
Live Top 5 (Semi-finals)	"I Still Haven't Found What I'm Looking For"	U2	December 8, 2014	7	Saved by Public Vote
Live Finale	"Over the Rainbow"	Judy Garland	December 15, 2014	12	Runner up
Live Finale	"Lost Stars" (with Adam Levine)	Adam Levine	December 15, 2014	8	Runner up
Live Finale	"Wasted Love" (Original song)	Matt McAndrew	December 15, 2014	4	Runner up

=== 2015: Republic Records ===
On February 13, 2015, Republic Records officially announced that McAndrew was part of their Class of 2015 lineup of artists. On the same day, The Voice released a YouTube video of Adam Levine drawing a checkmark on McAndrew's wrist, which was then made permanent by Studio City Tattoo, signifying that he had a record contract.

=== 2016: New label ===
On September 9, 2016, McAndrew released the independent EP Rush in Slowly, produced by Job Killer Records.

=== 2019–present: Rain City Drive ===
In January 2019, he became the lead vocalist in the American post-hardcore band Rain City Drive.

== Discography ==
=== Studio albums ===
Title	Album details
View of the Pines	Release: March 1, 2014; Label: Independent; Format: digital download

=== Singles ===
Title	Year	Peak chart positions	
Title	Year	US	CAN
"Wasted Love"	2014	14	17
"Counting on Love"	2015	—	—

=== Releases from The Voice ===
==== Albums ====
Title	Album details	Peak chart positions
Title	Album details	US
The Voice: The Complete Season 7 Collection	Release date: December 16, 2014; Label: Republic Records; Format: digital download	26

==== Singles ====
Title	Year	Peak chart positions		Album
Title	Year	US	CAN	Album
"A Thousand Years"	2014	—	—	The Voice: The Complete; Season 7 Collection
"Yellow" (with Ethan Butler)	2014	—	—	non-album single
"Drops of Jupiter"	2014	—	—	The Voice: The Complete; Season 7 Collection
"God Only Knows"	2014	—	—	The Voice: The Complete; Season 7 Collection
"Take Me to Church"	2014	92	—	The Voice: The Complete; Season 7 Collection
"Fix You"	2014	—	—	The Voice: The Complete; Season 7 Collection
"The Blower's Daughter"	2014	40	30	The Voice: The Complete; Season 7 Collection
"Make It Rain"	2014	81	95	The Voice: The Complete; Season 7 Collection
"I Still Haven't Found What I'm Looking For"	2014	—	—	The Voice: The Complete; Season 7 Collection
"Somewhere Over the Rainbow"	2014	—	—	The Voice: The Complete; Season 7 Collection
"Lost Stars" (with Adam Levine)	2014	83	86	The Voice: The Complete; Season 7 Collection
"—" denotes single that did not chart or was not released

=== Singles ===
Title	Year	Peak chart positions	
Title	Year	US	CAN
"Heavier", "Prayers", "Bury a Lie", "Talk to a Friend", "Wasting my Youth", “Like I Do” "Frozen (Reimagined)" "Medicate Me" "Neverbloom" "Over Me" "Easy Exit" "Ride Or Die"	2019	–	–
