= A Day to Remember discography =

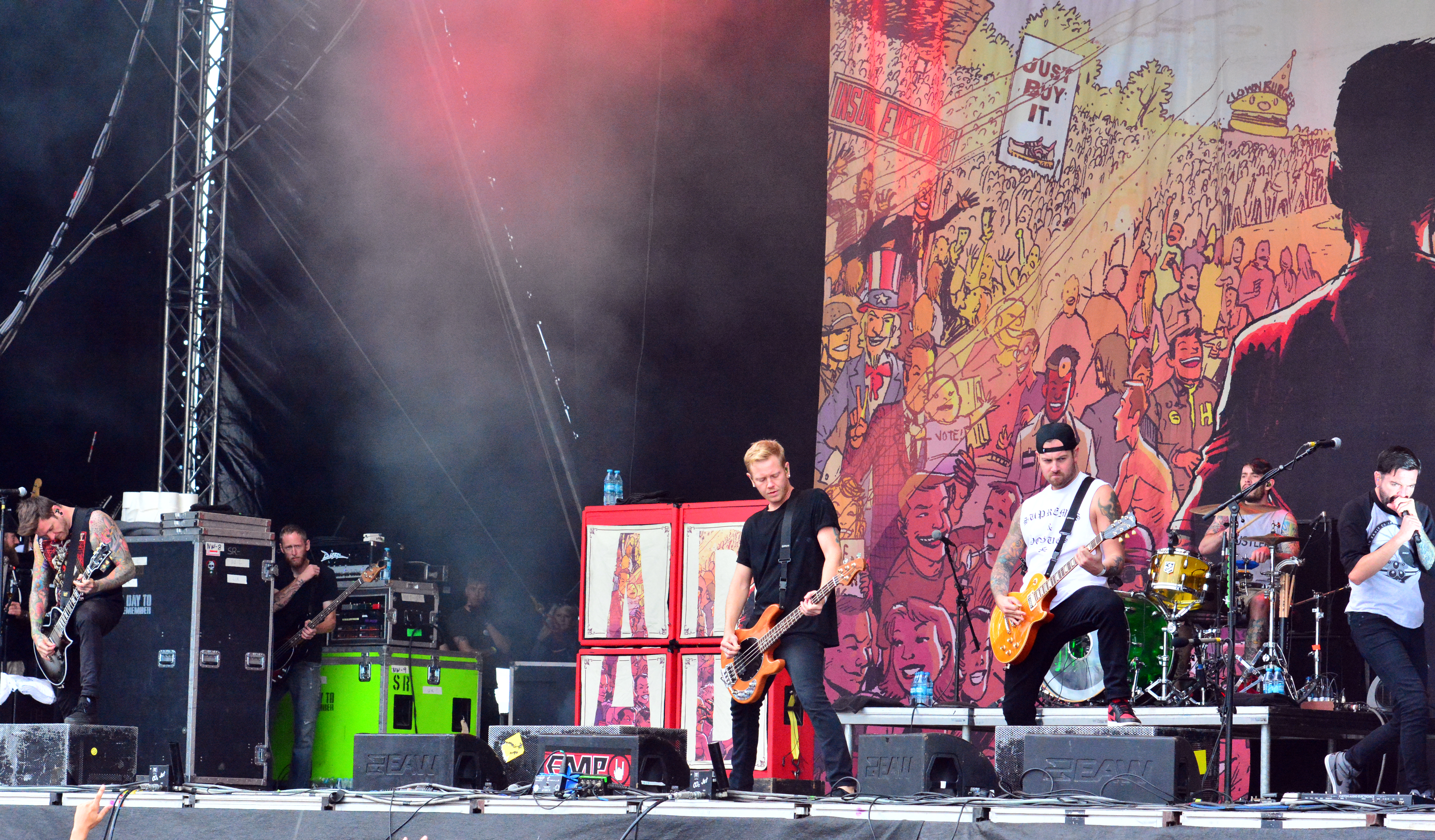
- A Day to Remember performing at Elbriot in 2014. From left to right: Neil Westfall, Joshua Woodard, Kevin Skaff, Alex Shelnutt and Jeremy McKinnon.
- Studio albums: 8
- Extended plays: 3
- Singles: 22
- Video albums: 3
- Music videos: 29
- Promotional singles: 3

The discography of American rock band A Day to Remember consists of eight studio albums, three video albums, three extended plays and twenty-two singles. The band signed to Indianola in February 2005 and released their debut album And Their Name Was Treason a few months later. Their second album, For Those Who Have Heart, was released in January 2007 and peaked at number 17 on the Heatseekers Album chart in the US; a re-release charted at number 43 on the Independent Albums chart in the US. Released in February 2009, Homesick charted at number 21 on the Billboard 200 chart and at number 1 on the Independent Albums chart. From the album, only the "Have Faith in Me" single charted; at number 40 on the Alternative Songs chart. Second single "The Downfall of Us All" and album track "If It Means a Lot to You" were both certified Gold by the RIAA for 500,000 downloads each. Fourth album What Separates Me from You (2010) debuted at number 11 on the Billboard 200 and its lead single "All I Want" peaked at number 12 on the Alternative Songs chart. Fifth album Common Courtesy (2013) was first released only digitally due a legal label dispute; a physical release followed later. The band released their sixth album, Bad Vibrations, in 2016 which charted at number 2 on the Billboard 200. The band released their seventh album You're Welcome in 2021.

== Studio albums ==
List of studio albums, with selected chart positions, sales figures and certifications
| Title | Album details | Peak chart positions | | | | | | | | | | Certifications | Sales |
| Title | Album details | US | AUS | AUT | BEL | CAN | GER | NZ | SCO | SWI | UK | Certifications | Sales |
|---|---|---|---|---|---|---|---|---|---|---|---|---|---|
| And Their Name Was Treason (Note: Re-released in October 2008 as Old Record and charted at number 16 on the Heatseekers chart.) | Released: May 10, 2005; Label: Indianola; Format: CD, DL | — | — | — | — | — | — | — | — | — | — | | US: 10,000 |
| For Those Who Have Heart (Note: Re-released in February 2008 with bonus tracks and charted at number 43 on the Independent Albums Chart.) | Released: January 22, 2007; Label: Victory; Format: CD, CS, DL, LP | — | — | — | — | — | — | — | — | — | — | | US: 20,000 |
| Homesick (Note: Re-released in October 2009.) | Released: February 3, 2009; Label: Victory; Format: CD, CS, DL, LP | 21 | — | — | — | — | — | — | — | — | 165 | RIAA: Gold; BPI: Gold; MC: Gold | US: 500,000; UK: 60,000 |
| What Separates Me from You | Released: November 15, 2010; Label: Victory; Format: CD, CS, DL, LP | 11 | 24 | — | — | — | — | — | — | — | 66 | RIAA: Gold; BPI: Silver | US: 500,000 |
| Common Courtesy (Note: The album was first released as a digital download; a physical release followed on November 25.) | Released: November 25, 2013; Label: ADTR; Format: CD, DL, LP | 37 | 13 | 40 | 188 | — | 48 | — | — | — | 57 | | US: 270,000 |
| Bad Vibrations | Released: September 2, 2016; Label: ADTR; Format: CD, DL, LP | 2 | 1 | 7 | 30 | 9 | 7 | 23 | 5 | 17 | 6 | | US: 102,000 |
| You're Welcome | Released: March 5, 2021; Label: Fueled by Ramen; Format: CD, DL, LP | 15 | 9 | 12 | 166 | — | 7 | — | 19 | 87 | 36 | | US: 24,000 |
| Big Ole Album Vol. 1 | Released: March 21, 2025; Label: Fueled by Ramen; Format: CD, LP, DL | 155 | 44 | 56 | — | — | 44 | 16 | 13 | — | — | | |
"—" denotes a recording that did not chart or was not released in that territory.

== EPs ==
List of extended plays
| Title | Album details |
|---|---|
| Halos for Heros, Dirt for the Dead | Released: 2004; Label: Self-released; Format: CD |
| A Day to Remember (Note: Track listing: "A Second Glance", "Casablanca Sucked Anyways", "Heartless" and "1958".) | Released: January 2005; Label: Self-released; Format: CD |
| Attack of the Killer B-Sides | Released: May 25, 2010; Label: Victory (VR570); Format: DL, 7" vinyl |

== Video albums ==
List of video albums
| Title | Album details |
|---|---|
| For Those Who Have Heart – DVD | Released: February 19, 2008; Label: Victory; Format: DVD |
| The Homesick – DVD | Released: October 27, 2009; Label: Victory; Format: DVD |
| Common Courtesy (The Series) | Released: November 25, 2013; Label: Self-released; Format: DVD |

== Singles ==
List of singles, with selected chart positions and certifications, showing year released and album name
| Title | Year | Peak chart positions | | | | | | | | | | Certifications | Album |
| Title | Year | US Alt. | US Main. Rock | US Rock | US Hot Hard Rock | US Hard Rock Digi. | AUS | CAN Rock | SCO | UK Sales | UK Rock | Certifications | Album |
|---|---|---|---|---|---|---|---|---|---|---|---|---|---|
| "NJ Legion Iced Tea" | 2009 | — | — | — | — | — | — | — | — | — | — | | Homesick |
| "The Downfall of Us All" | 2009 | — | — | — | — | — | — | — | — | — | — | RIAA: Gold; BPI: Silver | Homesick |
| "Have Faith in Me" | 2010 | 40 | — | — | — | — | — | — | — | — | — | RIAA: Gold | Homesick |
| "All I Want" (Note: A physical edition of the single was released on 7" vinyl as part of Record Store Day 2011.) | 2010 | 12 | 21 | 25 | — | 10 | — | 50 | — | — | 8 | RIAA: Gold; BPI: Silver | What Separates Me from You |
| "All Signs Point to Lauderdale" | 2011 | 32 | — | 48 | — | — | — | — | — | — | — | | What Separates Me from You |
| "It's Complicated" | 2011 | 33 | 38 | — | — | — | — | — | — | — | — | | What Separates Me from You |
| "Right Back at It Again" | 2013 | 33 | 36 | — | — | — | — | — | — | — | — | | Common Courtesy |
| "End of Me" | 2014 | 40 | 26 | — | — | — | — | — | — | — | — | | Common Courtesy |
| "Paranoia" | 2016 | — | 8 | 13 | — | 2 | 86 | — | 68 | 71 | 1 | * RIAA: Gold | Bad Vibrations |
| "Bad Vibrations" | 2016 | — | — | 46 | — | 7 | — | — | — | — | — | | Bad Vibrations |
| "Bullfight" | 2016 | — | 18 | — | — | 20 | — | — | — | — | — | | Bad Vibrations |
| "Naivety" | 2016 | — | 13 | 43 | — | 18 | — | — | — | — | — | | Bad Vibrations |
| "We Got This" | 2016 | — | — | 42 | — | — | — | — | — | — | — | | Bad Vibrations |
| "Same About You" | 2018 | — | 20 | — | — | — | — | — | — | — | — | | Bad Vibrations |
| "Degenerates" | 2019 | — | 22 | 29 | 7 | 21 | — | — | — | — | — | | You're Welcome |
| "Resentment" | 2019 | — | 14 | 10 | 10 | 2 | — | — | 100 | — | 33 | | You're Welcome |
| "Mindreader" | 2020 | — | — | 28 | 5 | 6 | — | — | — | — | — | | You're Welcome |
| "Brick Wall" | 2020 | — | — | — | 12 | — | — | — | — | — | — | | You're Welcome |
| "Everything We Need" | 2021 | — | 2 | 49 | — | — | — | — | — | — | — | | You're Welcome |
| "Re-Entry" (New version; featuring Mark Hoppus) | 2022 | 19 | 16 | — | 18 | — | — | — | — | — | — | | You're Welcome |
| "Miracle" | 2022 | — | 24 | 29 | 4 | 2 | — | — | — | — | — | | Big Ole Album Vol. 1 |
| "Feedback" | 2024 | — | 5 | — | 11 | — | — | — | — | — | — | | Big Ole Album Vol. 1 |
| "LeBron" | 2025 | — | — | — | 22 | — | — | — | — | — | — | | Big Ole Album Vol. 1 |
| "Make It Make Sense" | 2025 | — | — | — | 11 | — | — | — | — | — | — | | Big Ole Album Vol. 1 |
| "All My Friends" | 2025 | — | 16 | — | 9 | 6 | — | 35 | — | — | — | | Big Ole Album Vol. 1 |
"—" denotes releases that did not chart.

=== As featured artist ===
List of singles as featured artist, showing year released, selected chart position and album name
| Title | Year | Peak chart positions | | | | | | | | Album |
| Title | Year | US | US Dance | US Hard Rock Digi. | US Hot Hard Rock | US Main. Rock | US Rock | CHN Airplay /FL | SCO | Album |
|---|---|---|---|---|---|---|---|---|---|---|
| "Rescue Me" (Marshmello featuring A Day to Remember) | 2019 | 92 | 5 | — | — | — | — | 12 | 94 | Joytime III |
| "Always Let You Down" (Bilmuri featuring A Day to Remember) | 2026 | — | — | 5 | 3 | 6 | 45 | — | — | Kinda Hard |

=== Promotional singles ===
List of promotional releases, showing year released and album name
| Title | Year | Peak chart positions | Certifications | Album |
| Title | Year | US Main Rock | Certifications | Album |
|---|---|---|---|---|
| "Better Off This Way" | 2010 | 30 | | What Separates Me from You |
| "This Is the House That Doubt Built" (Note: Released date: December 19, 2011) | 2011 | — | | What Separates Me from You |
| "If It Means a Lot to You" (featuring Sierra Kusterbeck) | 2014 | — | RIAA: Platinum; BPI: Silver | Homesick |
| "I'm Made of Wax, Larry, What Are You Made Of?" | 2016 | — | RIAA: Gold | Homesick |
"—" denotes releases that did not chart or weren't released in that country.

=== Other charted songs ===
List of other charted songs, showing year released and album name
| Title | Year | Peak chart positions | | Album |
| Title | Year | US Hot Hard Rock | US Rock | Album |
|---|---|---|---|---|
| "Bloodsucker" | 2021 | 17 | — | You're Welcome |
| "F.Y.M." | 2021 | 18 | — | You're Welcome |
| "Last Chance to Dance (Bad Friend)" | 2021 | 4 | 41 | You're Welcome |
| "Bad Blood" | 2025 | 18 | — | Big Ole Album Vol. 1 |
| "To the Death" | 2025 | 16 | — | Big Ole Album Vol. 1 |
| "Flowers" | 2025 | 17 | — | Big Ole Album Vol. 1 |
| "Die for Me" | 2025 | 20 | — | Big Ole Album Vol. 1 |
| "Same Team" | 2025 | 24 | — | Big Ole Album Vol. 1 |
"—" denotes releases that did not chart or weren't released in that country.

== Music videos ==
List of music videos, showing year released and director
| Title | Year | Director |
|---|---|---|
| "Breathe Hope in Me" | 2004 | Daniel Harrison |
| "A Second Glance" | 2006 | Reel Players |
| "The Plot to Bomb the Panhandle" | 2007 | Dan Dobi |
| "Monument" (live) | 2007 | Team Orlando |
| "The Danger in Starting a Fire" | 2008 | Dan Dobi |
| "Since U Been Gone" | 2008 | Don Tyler |
| "The Downfall of Us All" | 2009 | Scott Hansen |
| "Mr. Highway's Thinking About the End" | 2009 | Perrone Salvatore Xavy |
| "Right Where You Want Me to Be" | 2009 | Drew Russ |
| "I'm Made of Wax, Larry, What Are You Made Of?" | 2010 | Dan Dobi |
| "Have Faith in Me" | 2010 | Mark Staubach |
| "All I Want" | 2011 | Drew Russ |
| "All Signs Point to Lauderdale" | 2011 | Chris Marrs Pillero |
| "2nd Sucks" | 2012 | Drew Russ |
| "Right Back at It Again" | 2013 | Drew Russ |
| "End of Me" | 2014 | Shane Drake |
| "I'm Already Gone" | 2014 | Sitcom Soldiers |
| "City of Ocala" | 2015 | Drew Russ |
| "Paranoia" | 2016 | Ethan Lader |
| "Bad Vibrations" | 2016 | Drew Russ |
| "Bullfight" | 2016 | Darren Doane |
| "Naivety" | 2016 | Darren Doane |
| "We Got This" | 2017 | Drew Russ |
| "Resentment" | 2019 | Jeb Hardwick |
| "Mindreader" | 2020 | Awesome Inc. |
| "Everything We Need" | 2021 | Reel Bear Media |
| "Last Chance to Dance (Bad Friend)" | 2021 | Max Moore |
| "Miracle" | 2022 | Jeb Hardwick |
| "Feedback" | 2024 | Jeb Hardwick |
| "All My Friends" | 2025 | Ryan Blewett |

== Original multi-artist compilation appearances ==
List of original multi-artist compilation appearances, with contribution, showing year released and album name
| Title | Album details | Contribution |
|---|---|---|
| Victory Records Winter Sampler | Released: 2006; Label: Victory; Format: CD | "The Plot to Bomb the Panhandle" (demo) |
| Punk Goes Pop Volume Two | Released: March 10, 2009; Label: Fearless (FRL 30119); Format: CD, digital download | "Over My Head (Cable Car)" |

== See also ==
- List of songs recorded by A Day to Remember
