= List of songs recorded by A Day to Remember =

The following is a sortable table of all songs by A Day to Remember:

- The column Song list the song title.
- The column Writer(s) lists who wrote the song.
- The column Album lists the album the song is featured on.
- The column Producer lists the producer of the song.
- The column Year lists the year in which the song was released.
- The column Length list the length/duration of the song.

== Studio recordings ==
Song	Writer(s)	Album	Producer	Year	Length
"1958"	A Day to Remember	And Their Name Was Treason	Andrew Wade	2005	4:29
"2nd Sucks"	Tom Denney, Jeremy McKinnon, Kevin Skaff, Chad Gilbert and A Day to Remember	What Separates Me from You	Chad Gilbert, Andrew Wade, Jeremy McKinnon	2010	2:27
"A 2nd Glance"^{[A]}	A Day to Remember	Old Record	Andrew Wade	2008	2:54
"A Second Glance"	A Day to Remember	And Their Name Was Treason	Andrew Wade	2005	2:53
"A Shot in the Dark"	A Day To Remember	For Those Who Have Heart	Eric Arena, A Day to Remember	2007	3:52
"All I Want"	Jeremy McKinnon, Kevin Skaff and A Day to Remember	What Separates Me from You	Chad Gilbert, Andrew Wade, Jeremy McKinnon	2010	3:22
"All I Want (Acoustic)"^{[F]}	Jeremy McKinnon, Kevin Skaff and A Day to Remember	–	Andrew Wade	2011	3:14
"All My Friends"	Jeremy McKinnon, Kevin Skaff, Drew Fulk, Zakk Cervini	Big Ole' Album Vol. 1	Andrew Fulk, Zakk Cervini, Jeremy McKinnon	2025	3:01
"All Signs Point to Lauderdale"	Tom Denney, Jeremy McKinnon, Kevin Skaff, Chad Gilbert and A Day to Remember	What Separates Me from You	Chad Gilbert, Andrew Wade, Jeremy McKinnon	2010	3:17
"Another Song About the Weekend"	A Day to Remember	Homesick	Chad Gilbert, A Day to Remember	2009	3:45
"Another Song About the Weekend (Acoustic)"	A Day to Remember	Homesick: Special Edition	Chad Gilbert, A Day to Remember	2009	3:42
"Bad Blood"	Jeremy McKinnon, Drew Fulk, Zakk Cervini, Bobby Lynge, Kevin Skaff, Until the End	Big Ole' Album Vol. 1	Andrew Fulk, Zakk Cervini, Jeremy McKinnon	2025	3:16
"Bad Vibrations"	Jeremy McKinnon, Kevin Skaff, Neil Westfall, Cody Quistad	Bad Vibrations	Bill Stevenson, Jason Livermore	2016	3:33
"Best of Me"	Tom Denney, Neil Westfall, Kevin Skaff, Andrew Wade and Chad Gilbert	Common Courtesy	Jeremy McKinnon, Andrew Wade, Chad Gilbert	2013	3:27
"Better Off This Way"	Jeremy McKinnon, Kevin Skaff and A Day to Remember	What Separates Me from You	Chad Gilbert, Andrew Wade, Jeremy McKinnon	2010	3:26
"Bloodsucker"	Andrew Fulk, Colin Brittain, Jeremy McKinnon, Kevin Skaff, Neil Westfall	You're Welcome	Colin Brittain, Jeremy McKinnon	2021	3:10
"Breathe Hope in Me"	–	Halos for Heros, Dirt for the Dead (EP)	Andrew Wade	2004	4:08
"Brick Wall"	Jeremy McKinnon, Colin Brittain, Kevin Skaff	You're Welcome	Colin Brittain, Jeremy McKinnon	2020	3:30
"Bullfight"	Jeremy McKinnon, Kevin Skaff, Neil Westfall	Bad Vibrations	Bill Stevenson, Jason Livermore	2016	4:35
"Camo"^{[G]}	–	Unreleased	Andrew Wade		–
"Casablanca Sucked Anyways."^{[A]}	A Day to Remember	Old Record	Andrew Wade	2008	2:57
"Casablanca Sucked Anyways"	A Day to Remember	And Their Name Was Treason	Andrew Wade	2005	2:53
"City of Ocala"	Jeremy McKinnon, Tom Denney and Chad Gilbert	Common Courtesy	Jeremy McKinnon, Andrew Wade, Chad Gilbert	2013	3:29
"Closer Than You Think"	Jeremy McKinnon, Drew Fulk, Zakk Cervini	Big Ole' Album Vol. 1	Andrew Fulk, Zakk Cervini, Jeremy McKinnon	2025	4:20
"Colder Than My Heart, If You Can Imagine"	A Day to Remember	For Those Who Have Heart	Eric Arena, A Day to Remember	2007	4:03
"Dead & Buried"	Jeremy McKinnon, Tom Denney and Chad Gilbert	Common Courtesy	Jeremy McKinnon, Andrew Wade, Chad Gilbert	2013	3:13
"Degenerates"	Jeremy McKinnon, Mike Green	You're Welcome	Colin Brittain, Jeremy McKinnon, Mike Green	2019	3:04
"Die For Me"	Jeremy McKinnon, Drew Fulk, Oli Sykes, Zakk Cervini	Big Ole' Album Vol. 1	Andrew Fulk, Zakk Cervini, Jeremy McKinnon	2025	2:50
"End of Me"	Jeremy McKinnon, Andrew Wade and Chad Gilbert	Common Courtesy	Jeremy McKinnon, Andrew Wade, Chad Gilbert	2013	3:58
"Everything We Need"	Jeremy McKinnon, Jon Bellion, Nick Long, Colin Brittain	You're Welcome	Colin Brittain, Jeremy McKinnon	2021	3:05
"Exposed"	Jeremy McKinnon, Cody Quistad, Kevin Skaff, Neil Westfall	Bad Vibrations	Bill Stevenson, Jason Livermore	2016	3:38
"Fast Forward to 2012"	A Day to Remember	For Those Who Have Heart	Eric Arena, A Day to Remember	2007	1:33
"Feedback"	Andrew Fulk, Trent Dabbs, Jeremy McKinnon	Big Ole' Album Vol. 1	Andrew Fulk, Zakk Cervini, Jeremy McKinnon	2024	2:32
"Flowers"	Jeremy McKinnon, Drew Fulk, Zakk Cervini	Big Ole' Album Vol. 1	Andrew Fulk, Zakk Cervini, Jeremy McKinnon	2025	3:21
"Forgive and Forget"	Jeremy McKinnon, Tom Denney, Kevin Skaff, Andrew Wade	Bad Vibrations	Bill Stevenson, Jason Livermore	2016	4:42
"F.Y.M"	Colin Brittain, Jeremy McKinnon, Kevin Skaff	You're Welcome	Colin Brittain, Jeremy McKinnon	2021	2:59
"Good Things"^{[H]}	Jeremy McKinnon, Chad Gilbert and Andrew Wade	Common Courtesy	Jeremy McKinnon, Andrew Wade, Chad Gilbert	2013	2:59
"Have Faith in Me"	A Day to Remember, Jeremy McKinnon, Jaison Lancaster	Homesick	Chad Gilbert, A Day to Remember	2009	3:08
"Heart Less"^{[A]}	A Day to Remember	Old Record	Andrew Wade	2008	2:53
"Heartless"	A Day to Remember	And Their Name Was Treason	Andrew Wade	2005	2:46
"Heartless"^{[B]}	A Day to Remember	For Those Who Have Heart (reissue)	Andrew Wade	2008	3:00
"Here's to the Past"	A Day to Remember	For Those Who Have Heart	Eric Arena, A Day to Remember	2007	3:59
"High Diving"	Colin Brittain, Jeremy McKinnon, Kevin Skaff, Jonathan Russell, Matthew Aveiro, Matthew Maust, Nathan Willett	You're Welcome	Colin Brittain, Jeremy McKinnon	2021	3:27
"Holdin' It Down for the Underground"	A Day to Remember	Homesick	Chad Gilbert, A Day to Remember	2009	3:23
"Homesick"	A Day to Remember	Homesick	Chad Gilbert, A Day to Remember	2009	3:56
"Homesick (Acoustic)"	A Day to Remember	Homesick: Special Edition	Chad Gilbert, A Day to Remember	2009	4:07
"I Heard It's the Softest Thing Ever"	A Day to Remember	For Those Who Have Heart	Eric Arena, A Day to Remember	2007	4:06
"I Remember"	Jeremy Mckinnon, Tom Denney and Andrew Wade	Common Courtesy	Jeremy McKinnon, Andrew Wade, Chad Gilbert	2013	9:04
"I Surrender"	Jeremy McKinnon, Chad Gilbert and Andrew Wade	Common Courtesy	Jeremy McKinnon, Andrew Wade, Chad Gilbert	2013	3:34
"I'm Already Gone"	Jeremy McKinnon, Kevin Skaff and Andrew Wade	Common Courtesy	Jeremy McKinnon, Andrew Wade, Chad Gilbert	2013	4:04
"I'm Made of Wax, Larry, What Are You Made Of?"	A Day to Remember	Homesick	Chad Gilbert, A Day to Remember	2009	3:00
"If I Leave"	Kevin Skaff, Jeremy McKinnon, Chad Gilbert and A Day to Remember	What Separates Me from You	Chad Gilbert, Andrew Wade, Jeremy McKinnon	2010	3:24
"If It Means a Lot to You"	A Day to Remember	Homesick	Chad Gilbert, A Day to Remember	2009	4:03
"If Looks Could Kill"	A Day to Remember	And Their Name Was Treason	Andrew Wade	2005	3:18
"If Looks Could Kill..."^{[A]}	A Day to Remember	Old Record	Andrew Wade	2008	3:18
"If Looks Could Kill... You'd Be Dead"	A Day to Remember	Halos for Heros, Dirt for the Dead (EP)	Andrew Wade	2004	3:22
"In Florida"	Jeremy McKinnon, Neil Westfall, Kevin Skaff	Bad Vibrations (dleuxe edition)	Bill Stevenson, Jason Livermore	2016	3:22
"Intro '05"^{[A]}	A Day to Remember	Old Record	Andrew Wade	2008	0:35
"Intro"	A Day to Remember	And Their Name Was Treason	Andrew Wade	2005	0:42
"It's Complicated"	Jeremy McKinnon, Kevin Skaff, Neil Westfall and A Day to Remember	What Separates Me from You	Chad Gilbert, Andrew Wade, Jeremy McKinnon	2010	2:57
"Justified"	Jeremy McKinnon, Kevin Skaff, Neil Westfall, Cody Quistad, Bill Stevenson	Bad Vibrations	Bill Stevenson, Jason Livermore	2016	3:58
"Last Chance to Dance (Bad Friend)"	Jeremy McKinnon, Neil Westfall, Will Putney	You're Welcome	Jeremy McKinnon, Will Putney, Colin Brittain	2021	3:05
"Last Request"	–	Halos for Heros, Dirt for the Dead (EP)	Andrew Wade	2004	3:46
"Leave All the Lights On"^{[H]}	Jeremy McKinnon and Andrew Wade	Common Courtesy	Jeremy McKinnon, Andrew Wade, Chad Gilbert	2013	3:31
"Lebron"	Jeremy McKinnon, Drew Fulk, Zakk Cervini	Big Ole' Album Vol. 1	Andrew Fulk, Zakk Cervini, Jeremy McKinnon	2025	2:46
"Life @ 11"	Jeremy McKinnon, Tom Denney, Chad Gilbert and Andrew Wade	Common Courtesy	Jeremy McKinnon, Andrew Wade, Chad Gilbert	2013	3:22
"Life Lessons Learned the Hard Way"	Jeremy McKinnon, Tom Denney and Neil Westfall	Common Courtesy	Jeremy McKinnon, Andrew Wade, Chad Gilbert	2013	2:17
"Looks Like Hell"	Jeremy McKinnon, Colin Brittain	You're Welcome	Colin Brittain, Jeremy McKinnon	2021	3:39
"Make It Make Sense"	Jeremy McKinnon, Cody Quistad, Drew Fulk, Zakk Cervini	Big Ole' Album Vol. 1	Andrew Fulk, Zakk Cervini, Jeremy McKinnon	2025	3:10
"Mindreader"	Jeremy McKinnon, Mike Green	You're Welcome	Jeremy McKinnon, Colin Brittain, Mike Green	2020	2:53
"Miracle"	Cody Quistad, Jeremy McKinnon, Will Putney	Big Ole' Album Vol. 1	Jeremy McKinnon, Cody Quistad, Colin Brittain, Andrew Wade	2022	4:03
"Money Maker"^{[D]}	A Day to Remember	Unreleased	Chad Gilbert		–
"Monument"	A Day to Remember	For Those Who Have Heart	Eric Arena, A Day to Remember	2007	3:48
"My Life for Hire"	A Day to Remember	Homesick	Chad Gilbert, A Day to Remember	2009	3:33
"Naivety"	Jeremy McKinnon, Kevin Skaff, Bill Stevenson	Bad Vibrations	Bill Stevenson, Jason Livermore	2016	3:19
"Negative Space"	Jeremy McKinnon, Josh Woodard, Kevin Skaff	Bad Vibrations (dleuxe edition)	Bill Stevenson, Jason Livermore	2016	3:37
"No Cigar"^{[E]}	Millencolin	–	–	2011	3:02
"Mr. Highway's Thinking About the End"	A Day to Remember	Homesick	Chad Gilbert, A Day to Remember	2009	4:17
"Nineteen Fifty Eight"^{[A]}	A Day to Remember	Old Record	Andrew Wade	2008	4:38
"NJ Legion Iced Tea"	A Day to Remember	Homesick	Chad Gilbert, A Day to Remember	2009	3:31
"Only Money"	Dan Book, Jeremy McKinnon, Neil Westfall	You're Welcome	Colin Brittain, Dan Book, Jeremy McKinnon	2021	3:30
"Out of Time"	Jeremy McKinnon, Kevin Skaff and A Day to Remember	What Separates Me from You	Chad Gilbert, Andrew Wade, Jeremy McKinnon	2010	3:26
"Over My Head (Cable Car)"^{[C]}	Joe King, Isaac Slade	Punk Goes Pop Volume Two	Andrew Wade	2009	3:31
"Paranoia"	Jeremy McKinnon, Kevin Skaff, Neil Westfall	Bad Vibrations	Bill Stevenson, Jason Livermore	2016	3:22
"Permanent"	Cody Quistad, Jeremy McKinnon	You're Welcome	Colin Brittain, Jeremy McKinnon	2021	3:42
"Reassemble"	Andrew Wade, Jeremy McKinnon, Kevin Skaff, Neil Westfall	Bad Vibrations	Bill Stevenson, Jason Livermore	2016	3:57
"Resentment"	Cody Quistad, Jeremy McKinnon	You're Welcome	Colin Brittain, Jeremy McKinnon	2019	3:47
"Re-Entry"	Jeremy McKinnon, Mike Green, Zac Carper	You're Welcome	Colin Brittain, Jeremy McKinnon	2021	2:53
"Right Back at It Again"	Jeremy McKinnon, Tom Denney, Neil Westfall and Andrew Wade	Common Courtesy	Jeremy McKinnon, Andrew Wade, Chad Gilbert	2013	3:20
"Right Where You Want Me to Be"^{[C]}	A Day to Remember	Non-album track	Andrew Wade	2009	3:42
"Same About You"	Jeremy McKinnon, Kevin Skaff, Neil Westfall, Alex Shelnutt	Bad Vibrations	Bill Stevenson, Jason Livermore	2016	3:04
"Same Book But Never the Same Page"^{[H]}	Jeremy McKinnon, Chad Gilbert, Kevin Skaff, Neil Westfall and Andrew Wade	Common Courtesy	Jeremy McKinnon, Andrew Wade, Chad Gilbert	2013	4:06
"Same Team"	Jeremy McKinnon, Cody Quistad, Drew Fulk, Zakk Cervini	Big Ole' Album Vol. 1	Andrew Fulk, Zakk Cervini, Jeremy McKinnon	2025	3:32
"Second Guess"^{[G]}	–	Unreleased	Andrew Wade		–
"Show 'Em the Ropes"	A Day to Remember	For Those Who Have Heart	Eric Arena, A Day to Remember	2007	3:23
"Silence"	Jeremy McKinnon, Cody Quistad, Will Putney, Zakk Cervini	Big Ole' Album Vol. 1	Andrew Fulk, Zakk Cervini, Jeremy McKinnon	2025	3:20
"Since U Been Gone"^{[C]}	Lukasz Gottwald, Martin Sandberg	For Those Who Have Heart (reissue)	Andrew Wade	2008	3:18
"Sometimes You're the Hammer, Sometimes You're the Nail"	Jeremy McKinnon, Tom Denney, Neil Westfall, Cody Quistad and Andrew Wade	Common Courtesy	Jeremy McKinnon, Andrew Wade, Chad Gilbert	2013	4:34
"Sound the Alarm"	A Day to Remember	And Their Name Was Treason	Andrew Wade	2005	1:49
"Sound the Alarm V.2.0"^{[A]}	A Day to Remember	Old Record	Andrew Wade	2008	1:49
"Speak of the Devil"	A Day to Remember	For Those Who Have Heart	Eric Arena, A Day to Remember	2007	3:24
"Start the Shooting"	A Day to Remember	For Those Who Have Heart	Eric Arena, A Day to Remember	2007	4:44
"Sticks & Bricks"	Jeremy McKinnon, Kevin Skaff, Neil Westfall and A Day to Remember	What Separates Me from You	Chad Gilbert, Andrew Wade, Jeremy McKinnon	2010	3:16
"The Danger in Starting a Fire"	A Day to Remember	For Those Who Have Heart	Eric Arena, A Day to Remember	2007	3:03
"The Document Speaks for Itself"	Jeremy McKinnon, Kevin Skaff, Neil Westfall and Andrew Wade	Common Courtesy	Jeremy McKinnon, Andrew Wade, Chad Gilbert	2013	4:43
"The Downfall of Us All"	A Day to Remember	Homesick	Chad Gilbert, A Day to Remember	2009	3:26
"The Plot to Bomb the Panhandle"	A Day to Remember	For Those Who Have Heart	Eric Arena, A Day to Remember	2007	4:04
"The Price We Pay"	A Day to Remember	For Those Who Have Heart	Eric Arena, A Day to Remember	2007	2:43
"This Is the House That Doubt Built"	Jeremy McKinnon, Kevin Skaff, Chad Gilbert and A Day to Remember	What Separates Me from You	Chad Gilbert, Andrew Wade, Jeremy McKinnon	2010	3:30
"This Sun Has Set"	–	Halos for Heros, Dirt for the Dead (EP)	Andrew Wade	2004	2:40
"To The Death"	Jeremy McKinnon, Cody Quistad, Drew Fulk	Big Ole' Album Vol. 1	Andrew Fulk, Zakk Cervini, Jeremy McKinnon	2025	2:57
"Turn Off the Radio"	Jeremy McKinnon, Kevin Skaff, Andrew Wade, Neil Westfall	Bad Vibrations	Bill Stevenson, Jason Livermore	2016	3:46
"Viva La Mexico"	A Day to Remember, Colin Brittain	You're Welcome	Colin Brittain, Jeremy McKinnon	2021	3:37
"U Had Me @ Hello"^{[A]}	A Day to Remember	Old Record	Andrew Wade	2008	4:35
"U Should of Killed Me When U Had the Chance"^{[A]}	A Day to Remember	Old Record	Andrew Wade	2008	3:34
"Violence (Enough Is Enough)"	Jeremy McKinnon, Neil Westfall, Tom Denney, Kevin Skaff and Andrew Wade	Common Courtesy	Jeremy McKinnon, Andrew Wade, Chad Gilbert	2013	4:01
"We Got This"	Jeremy McKinnon, Kevin Skaff, Neil Westfall	Bad Vibrations	Bill Stevenson, Jason Livermore	2016	3:49
"Welcome to the Family"	A Day to Remember	Homesick	Chad Gilbert, A Day to Remember	2009	3:00
"Westfall"	–	Halos for Heros, Dirt for the Dead (EP)	Andrew Wade	2004	4:04
"Why Walk on Water When We've Got Boats"	A Day to Remember	For Those Who Have Heart (reissue)	Andrew Wade	2008	1:54
"You Already Know What You Are"	A Day to Remember	Homesick	Chad Gilbert, A Day to Remember	2009	1:27
"You Be Tails, I'll Be Sonic"	Tom Denney, Jeremy McKinnon, Kevin Skaff, Neil Westfall and A Day to Remember	What Separates Me from You	Chad Gilbert, Andrew Wade, Jeremy McKinnon	2010	3:47
"You Had Me at Hello"	A Day to Remember	And Their Name Was Treason	Andrew Wade	2005	4:29
"You Should Have Killed Me When You Had the Chance"	A Day to Remember	And Their Name Was Treason	Andrew Wade	2005	3:34
"You Should've Killed Me When You Had the Chance"^{[B]}	A Day to Remember	For Those Who Have Heart (reissue)	Andrew Wade	2008	3:40
"Your Way with Words Is Through Silence!"^{[A]}	A Day to Remember	Old Record	Andrew Wade	2008	3:55
"Your Way with Words Is Through Silence"	A Day to Remember	And Their Name Was Treason	Andrew Wade	2005	3:54

== Live recordings ==
Song	Location	Writer(s)	Album	Year	Length
"1958"	The Capitol in Ocala, Florida	–	For Those Who Have Heart	2008	4:15
"A Shot in the Dark"	The Capitol in Ocala, Florida	–	For Those Who Have Heart	2008	4:11
"A Shot in the Dark"	Greenfield Festival in Interlaken, Switzerland	–	Homesick: Special Edition Deluxe	2009	4:42
"Downfall of Us All"	San Francisco, California	–	Homesick: Special Edition Deluxe	2009	3:56
"Fast Forward to 2012"	The Capitol in Ocala, Florida	–	For Those Who Have Heart	2008	2:27
"Fast Forward to 2012"	Tucson, Arizona	–	Homesick: Special Edition Deluxe	2009	1:44
"Fast Forward to 2012"	Greenfield Festival in Interlaken, Switzerland	–	Homesick: Special Edition Deluxe	2009	1:46
"I'm Made of Wax, Larry, What Are You Made Of?"	Greenfield Festival in Interlaken, Switzerland	A Day to Remember	Homesick: Special Edition Deluxe	2009	3:47
"I'm Made of Wax, Larry, What Are You Made Of?"	Ventura, California	A Day to Remember	Homesick: Special Edition Deluxe	2009	3:15
"Heartless"	The Capitol in Ocala, Florida	–	For Those Who Have Heart	2008	2:54
"Monument"	The Capitol in Ocala, Florida	–	For Those Who Have Heart	2008	3:48
"Mr. Highway's Thinking About the End"	Greenfield Festival in Interlaken, Switzerland	A Day to Remember	Homesick: Special Edition Deluxe	2009	3:23
"Mr. Highway's Thinking About the End"	Ventura, California	A Day to Remember	Homesick: Special Edition Deluxe	2009	3:49
"My Life for Hire"	Greenfield Festival in Interlaken, Switzerland	A Day to Remember	Homesick: Special Edition Deluxe	2009	3:56
"My Life for Hire"	Las Vegas, Nevada	A Day to Remember	Homesick: Special Edition Deluxe	2009	3:25
"Since U Been Gone"	The Capitol in Ocala, Florida	Lukasz Gottwald, Martin Sandberg	For Those Who Have Heart	2008	3:06
"The Danger in Starting a Fire"	The Capitol in Ocala, Florida	–	For Those Who Have Heart	2008	2:57
"The Danger in Starting a Fire"	Greenfield Festival in Interlaken, Switzerland	–	Homesick: Special Edition Deluxe	2009	3:37
"The Danger in Starting a Fire"	Orlando, Florida	–	Homesick: Special Edition Deluxe	2009	3:31
"The Downfall of Us All"	Greenfield Festival in Interlaken, Switzerland	A Day to Remember	Homesick: Special Edition Deluxe	2009	3:57
"The Plot to Bomb the Panhandle"	The Capitol in Ocala, Florida	–	For Those Who Have Heart	2008	4:28
"The Plot to Bomb the Panhandle"	Greenfield Festival in Interlaken, Switzerland	–	Homesick: Special Edition Deluxe	2009	4:17
"Why Walk on Water When We've Got Boats"	The Capitol in Ocala, Florida	–	For Those Who Have Heart	2008	2:00
"You Should Have Killed Me When You Had the Chance"	Greenfield Festival in Interlaken, Switzerland	A Day to Remember	Homesick: Special Edition Deluxe	2009	3:41
"You Should've Killed Me When You Had the Chance"	The Capitol in Ocala, Florida	–	For Those Who Have Heart	2008	3:45
