= A Day to Remember (disambiguation) =

A Day to Remember is an American rock band.

A Day to Remember may also refer to:

- A Day to Remember (EP), by A Day to Remember
- A Day to Remember (1953 film), a British film
- A Day to Remember (1991 film), a French film
- "A Day to Remember" (Doctors), a 2004 television episode
- "A Day to Remember" (My Hero), a 2002 television episode

== See also ==
- Day To Remember, a television play
