= The Downfall of Us All =

Single by A Day to Remember

from the album Homesick
- Released: May 26, 2009
- Recorded: October–November 2008
- Studio: The Wade Studio, Ocala, Florida
- Genre: Metalcore; pop-punk
- Length: 3:29
- Label: Victory
- Songwriter(s): A Day to Remember
- Producer(s): Chad Gilbert; A Day to Remember

A Day to Remember singles chronology
| "If It Means a Lot to You" (2009) | "The Downfall of Us All" (2009) | "Have Faith in Me" (2010) |

"The Downfall of Us All" is a song by American rock band A Day to Remember from their third studio album Homesick. It was released as a single on May 26, 2009.

== Writing and recording ==
McKinnon was driving to Ocala, Florida when the chorus guitar riff to "The Downfall of Us All" came to him, sometime in September 2008. Upon arriving at his mom's house, he got an acoustic guitar and worked the song out. Shortly before playing at a gig, the band practiced a breakdown in A cappella, McKinnon proceeded to say that it would be a good idea to open Homesick (2009) with it, to which his bandmates said "Are you retarded? Yeah, we'll see when it's recorded." The song's lyrics are about pressure when it comes to songwriting and the attempt to make people happy because of it.

New Found Glory guitarist Chad Gilbert, who produced Homesick, was shown a demo of the song. The band immediately told him that it would be the album's opening track. Gilbert said: "in my opinion, first songs are often the first thing people hear, so it should almost encompass the whole record. [...] I feel if you never heard the band before, and you hear "Downfall," it's a perfect introduction."

== Release and reception ==
"The Downfall of Us All" was posted on the group's Myspace profile on January 26, 2009, prior to its release on Homesick. A music video premiered through MTV2 on March 3. The track was released to alternative radio stations on May 26. In February 2014, the track was certified gold by the Recording Industry Association of America.

AllMusic reviewer James Christopher Monger said "The Downfall of Us All" would gain an extra "life in countless montages on MTV reality shows and 30-second cola commercials". Brendan Manley of Alternative Press called the song an "explosive opening track" that "sets not just the sonic tone" for the follow tracks, but also the record's "thematic bent, too." Rock on Request reviewer Anthony Avina listed the song, alongside "Welcome to the Family" and "Homesick", as examples that displayed the group's "wide range of talent" on the album. Sputnikmusic's John Hanson said the song's intro was "just one example of embarrassing decisions" by the group "to include “memorable” moments in songs."

== Track listing ==
Digital download

1. "The Downfall of Us All" – 3:29

Promotional CD

1. "The Downfall of Us All" – 3:31
2. "The Downfall of Us All (instrumental)" – 3:22

== Certification ==
| Region | Certification | Certified units/sales |
|---|---|---|
| United Kingdom (BPI) | Silver | 200,000^{‡} |
| United States (RIAA) | Gold | 500,000^{‡} |
^{‡} Sales+streaming figures based on certification alone.
