= Joytime III =

Studio album by Marshmello
- Released: July 2, 2019
- Genre: EDM; future bass; trap; house; dubstep
- Length: 38:48
- Label: Joytime Collective
- Producer: Marshmello; Bellecour; Crankdat; Flux Pavilion; Slushii; Tynan; Wiwek; Yultron

Marshmello chronology
Roll the Dice (2019)	Joytime III (2019)	Shockwave (2021)

Singles from Joytime III
- 1. "Rescue Me" Released: June 14, 2019; 2. "Room to Fall" Released: June 27, 2019

Joytime III is the third studio album by American DJ and record producer Marshmello. It was released on July 2, 2019, one day earlier than its planned release date, July 3. The album features collaborations with producers Bellecour, Crankdat, Flux Pavilion, Slushii, Tynan, Wiwek, and Yultron. Joytime III also features vocals by A Day to Remember, Elohim, and Marshmello himself. All 13 songs were released early via a video game release, promoting both the game and the album.

== Singles ==
"Rescue Me", a collaboration with American band A Day to Remember, was released as the first single from the album on June 14, 2019. "Room to Fall", a collaboration with producers Flux Pavilion and Elohim, was released as the second single on June 27, 2019.

== Track listing ==
Credits adapted from Tidal.

No.	Title	Writer(s)	Producer(s)	Length
1.	"Down"	Christopher Comstock	Marshmello	2:33
2.	"Run It Up"	Comstock; Aaron Jennings Puckett	Marshmello	2:22
3.	"Put Yo Hands Up" (with Slushii)	Comstock; Julian Scanlan	Marshmello; Slushii	3:16
4.	"Let's Get Down" (with Yultron)	Comstock; Yulton Lee	Marshmello; Yultron	2:43
5.	"Sad Songs"	Comstock; Puckett	Marshmello	3:14
6.	"Set Me Free" (with Bellecour)	Comstock; Anthony Romera; Jordan Viviant	Marshmello; Bellecour	3:03
7.	"Room to Fall" (with Flux Pavilion featuring Elohim)	Comstock; Joshua Steele	Marshmello; Flux Pavilion	3:00
8.	"Angklung Life" (with Wiwek)	Comstock; Wiwek Mahabali	Marshmello; Wiwek	3:09
9.	"Earthquake" (with Tynan)	Comstock; Kevin Hickey	Marshmello; Tynan	2:28
10.	"Falling to Pieces" (with Crankdat)	Comstock; Christian Smith	Marshmello; Crankdat	2:45
11.	"Here We Go Again"	Comstock	Marshmello	3:05
12.	"Rescue Me" (featuring A Day to Remember)	Comstock; Andrew Wade	Marshmello	3:56
13.	"Proud"	Comstock; Puckett	Marshmello	3:11
Total length:				37:25

== Charts ==
Chart (2019)	Peak position
Belgian Albums (Ultratop Flanders)	103
Belgian Albums (Ultratop Wallonia)	131
Canadian Albums (Billboard)	53
Dutch Albums (Album Top 100)	73
Lithuanian Albums (AGATA)	27
Norwegian Albums (VG-lista)	19
Swedish Albums (Sverigetopplistan)	50
US Billboard 200	50
US Independent Albums (Billboard)	29
US Top Dance Albums (Billboard)	1
