= Attack of the Killer B-Sides =

- Original EP artwork by Mike C. Harcdore

EP by A Day to Remember
- Released: May 25, 2010
- Recorded: 2007–09
- Studio: The Wade Studio, Ocala, Florida
- Genre: Pop-punk
- Length: 14:13
- Label: Victory
- Producer: Andrew Wade

A Day to Remember chronology
Homesick (2009)	Attack of the Killer B-Sides (2010)	What Separates Me from You (2010)

Attack of the Killer B-Sides is the third EP by the American rock band A Day to Remember. It was released on May 25, 2010, through Victory. (Note: U.S. Victory VR570-1) First vinyl releases of the EP were on clear white smoke (200 copies), toxic green (1300 copies), and pink vinyl (500 copies), the latter being a Hot Topic exclusive release. Pre-orders were taken a couple of weeks before on May 17.

== Content ==
The EP features 4 songs, all recorded at The Wade Studios by Andrew Wade in Ocala, Florida and were previously released in some form by the band, though not on an album:

- "Right Where You Want Me to Be" was released as a special stand-alone holiday single for Christmas in 2009.
- "Since U Been Gone" was released on the 2008 re-release of For Those Who Have Heart (2007).
- "Another Song About the Weekend" (Acoustic) was released on the special edition of Homesick (2009).
- "Over My Head (Cable Car)" was released on the Punk Goes Pop 2 (2009) compilation.

== Reissues ==
The EP, along with For Those Who Have Heart and Homesick, had a reissue on vinyl, in 2011. Another vinyl reissue was released, on August 13, 2013, in 3 different colors. (Note: Clear Red with Black Smoke (215 copies): VR570-7V-CSREBK; Orange Cream (Solid Orange) (654 copies): VR570-7V-SLORVN; Black (1,400 copies): VR570-7V-SLBKVN) Then, for Record Store Day in 2025, the band released a limited number of the EP in Neon Orange.

== Reception ==
Thrash Hits reviewer Tom Doyle said that the first track, "Right Where You Want Me to Be", started "things off in pleasant enough fashion" with "its bouncing, super-infectious chorus". Doyle called the band's cover of Kelly Clarkson's "Since U Been Gone" "a pretty sedate plod through a song which wasn’t really that good to begin with", and that their cover of The Fray's "Over My Head (Cable Car)" suited better to the band's style.

== Track list ==
All songs written by A Day to Remember, unless noted.

Side one
No.	Title	Length
1.	"Right Where You Want Me to Be"	3:42
2.	"Since U Been Gone" (Kelly Clarkson cover)	3:18

Side two
No.	Title	Length
3.	"Another Song About the Weekend" (acoustic)	3:42
4.	"Over My Head (Cable Car)" (The Fray cover)	3:31

== Personnel ==
Personnel per Attack of the Killer B-Sides sleeve.

A Day to Remember

- Josh Woodard – bass
- Alex Shelnutt – drums
- Neil Westfall – rhythm guitar
- Jeremy McKinnon – vocals
- Kevin Skaff – lead guitar

Additional musician

- Tom Denney – lead guitar (tracks 2–4)

Production

- Andrew Wade – producer
- Mike Cortada – cover illustration
- Doublej – layout
- Adam Elmakias – band photo
