= If It Means a Lot to You =

2009 song by A Day to Remember

Single by A Day to Remember featuring Sierra Kusterbeck

from the album Homesick
- Released: September 29, 2014
- Studio: The Wade Studios, Ocala, Florida
- Genre: Alternative rock; emo
- Length: 4:04
- Label: Victory
- Songwriter: Jeremy McKinnon
- Producers: Chad Gilbert; A Day to Remember

"If It Means a Lot to You" is a song by the American rock band A Day to Remember featuring American singer Sierra Kay (credited as Sierra Kusterbeck on the release). Produced by Chad Gilbert and A Day to Remember, it was featured as the closing track on the band's 2009 studio album, Homesick.

== Composition and lyric ==
Written by lead vocalist, Jeremy McKinnon, "If It Means a Lot to You” is a song about leaving behind a special person, swearing you will be back soon and often but, as time goes on, coming home is not as simple as one thought it would be. The song narrates McKinnon's experience while he is away touring and can't return to his loved one.

== Promotion and release ==
The song was originally only released as part of the album in February 2009, and was not a single. However, after gaining overwhelming popularity among fans, it was re-released as a radio airplay single over five years later on September 29, 2014. It was included in the Rock Band video game in downloadable mode. In 2019, it surpassed 100 million plays on Spotify, making it the most listened to song by the band on that platform.

== Personnel ==
All credits adapted by Genius.

A Day to Remember

- Jeremy McKinnon — lead vocals, acoustic guitar, producer, engineering
- Tom Denney — lead and acoustic guitar, backing vocals
- Neil Westfall — rhythm guitar, backing vocals
- Joshua Woodard — bass

Additional personnel

- Sierra Kusterbeck — guest vocals
- Josh Freese — drums
- Chad Gilbert — production, recording, programming
- Dave Guynn — harmonica

== Certifications ==
Region	Certification	Certified units/sales
United Kingdom (BPI)	Silver	200,000^{‡}
United States (RIAA)	Platinum	1,000,000^{‡}
^{‡} Sales+streaming figures based on certification alone.
