= Rescue Me (Marshmello song) =

Single by Marshmello featuring A Day to Remember

from the album Joytime III
- Released: June 14, 2019
- Genre: EDM; pop rock; punk rock; pop-punk
- Length: 3:57
- Label: Joytime Collective
- Songwriters: Christopher Comstock; Andrew Wade
- Producer: Marshmello

Marshmello singles chronology
"Light It Up" (2019)	"Rescue Me" (2019)	"One Thing Right" (2019)

A Day to Remember singles chronology
"Same About You" (2018)	"Rescue Me" (2019)	"Degenerates" (2019)

Music video
- "Rescue Me" on YouTube

"Rescue Me" is a song by American DJ and producer Marshmello featuring American rock band A Day to Remember. The song was released on June 14, 2019, along with its official music video. It is the first single from Marshmello's third album, Joytime III.

== Release and promotion ==
Marshmello teased the single on Twitter, and the fact that the single will be the first single from his forthcoming album Joytime III.

== Charts ==
=== Weekly charts ===
Chart (2019)	Peak position
China Airplay/FL (Billboard)	12
Scottish Singles Sales (Official Charts)	94
US Billboard Hot 100	92
US Hot Dance/Electronic Songs (Billboard)	5

=== Year-end charts ===
Chart (2019)	Position
US Hot Dance/Electronic Songs (Billboard)	36
