= Have Faith in Me =

Single by A Day to Remember

from the album Homesick
- Released: March 2, 2010
- Recorded: October–November 2008, The Wade Studio, Ocala, Florida
- Length: 3:08
- Label: Victory
- Songwriters: A Day to Remember; Jason Lancaster
- Producers: Chad Gilbert; A Day to Remember

A Day to Remember singles chronology
"The Downfall of Us All" (2009)	"Have Faith in Me" (2010)	"All I Want" (2010)

"Have Faith in Me" is a single by A Day to Remember from their third studio album Homesick. It was released as a radio single on March 2, 2010. The song charted at number 40 on the Alternative Songs.

== Composition ==
I feel like this one is kind of self-explanatory, but it's about trust and being there for people when you say you will be. I'm the kind of person who says what I mean, and this song is about keeping your word.

— Jeremy McKinnon, on "Have Faith in Me", 2009

The song was written by A Day to Remember, with lyrics by vocalist Jeremy McKinnon and Jason Lancaster. The lyrics are about trusting other people, and looking after them.

== Release and performances ==
While discussing a live video of "I'm Made of Wax, Larry, What Are You Made Of?", guitarist Neil Westfall said the band's following music video might be for "Have Faith in Me". "Have Faith in Me" was then announced to be a single on September 25, 2009. In a March 2010 interview with Alter the Press!, lead guitarist Kevin Skaff said the next video the band were working on was going to be for "Have Faith in Me", which Westfall said would be filmed on March 21. The band had performed acoustic versions of both "Homesick" and "Have Faith in Me" before a gig show on April 9, for 98 Rock, and again, this time for KROQ a few months later. Both songs were played, on electric instruments, for Alternative Press' The AP Sessions. The band played "Have Faith in Me" again acoustically, but this time for MTV in April, which was posted on April 16.

The music video for "Have Faith in Me", directed by Mark Staubach, was released on July 14, receiving its world premiere on MTV. "Have Faith in Me" charted at number 40 on the Billboard Modern Rock Tracks. The song was, for five weeks in a row, the most requested song at KROQ, and received over 7,000 plays by radio stations across the U.S. The song is available as downloadable content for Rock Band. "Have Faith in Me" was called a tribute to Blink-182, by Punknews.org reviewer Elliot.

== Track listing ==
Digital download

1. "Have Faith in Me" – 3:08

Promotional CD

1. "Have Faith in Me (Album Version)" – 3:08
2. "Have Faith in Me (Instrumental Version)" – 3:08

== Personnel ==
Personnel per album booklet.

A Day to Remember

- Jeremy McKinnon — vocals
- Alex Shelnutt — drums
- Neil Westfall — rhythm guitar
- Josh Woodard — bass guitar
- Tom Denney — lead guitar

Production

- Chad Gilbert and A Day to Remember — producers
- Andrew Wade, Chris Rubey, and Jason Lancaster — pre-production
- Adam Dutkiewicz — mixing
- Alan Douches — mastering

== Chart positions ==
Chart (2010)	Peak position
U.S. Billboard Alternative Songs	40

== Certifications ==
Region	Certification	Certified units/sales
United States (RIAA)	Gold	500,000^{‡}
^{‡} Sales+streaming figures based on certification alone.
