= Homesick (A Day to Remember album) =

Studio album by A Day to Remember
- Released: February 3, 2009
- Recorded: October 25 – November 30, 2008
- Studios: The Wade Studio, Ocala, Florida, US
- Genres: Metalcore; pop-punk; post-hardcore
- Length: 40:37
- Label: Victory
- Producers: Chad Gilbert; Adam Dutkiewicz; Andrew Wade

A Day to Remember chronology
For Those Who Have Heart (2007)	Homesick (2009)	Attack of the Killer B-Sides (2010)

Singles from Homesick
- 1. "NJ Legion Iced Tea" Released: January 27, 2009; 2. "The Downfall of Us All" Released: May 26, 2009; 3. "Have Faith in Me" Released: March 2, 2010; 4. "If It Means a Lot to You" Released: September 29, 2014 (radio airplay)

Homesick is the third studio album by the American rock band A Day to Remember, produced by Chad Gilbert and the band, and released on February 3, 2009. It was the band's second album for Victory. The album features material written while the band had been touring, which Andrew Wade helped them demo. Recording took place between October and November 2008 at The Wade Studio, located in Ocala. Featured on the album are guest vocalists Mike Hranica (The Devil Wears Prada), Vincent Bennett (The Acacia Strain) and Sierra Kusterbeck (VersaEmerge). Several of the album's songs appeared on the band's MySpace profile before the release of the album.

Planned for a mid-February 2009 release by Victory before being moved forward two weeks, the album sold 22,000 copies in the first week and charted at number 21 on the US Billboard 200. It also charted at number 165 in the UK. It was the band's final album featuring Tom Denney on guitar, who was replaced on tour by Kevin Skaff. Three singles were released from the album: "NJ Legion Iced Tea" in January 2009, "The Downfall of Us All" in May, and "Have Faith in Me" in March 2010. Only the third of these charted, at number 40 on the Billboard Alternative Songs chart. A re-release with additional tracks was released in October 2009. Several of the album tracks are available for Rock Band. In 2014, two songs from the album, "The Downfall of Us All" and "If It Means a Lot to You", were certified gold by the RIAA. The album was certified Silver in the UK by the BPI in 2015, and Gold in the United States the following year.

== Background and composition ==
A Day to Remember were pressed for a new album by their record label, Victory, in early 2008; bassist Joshua Woodard said the band weren't ready to record a new album at the time. This resulted in a re-release of their previous album, For Those Who Have Heart (2007), with additional tracks. The songs featured on Homesick were written while the band were on Warped Tour 2008 and on the Easycore Tour with producer Chad Gilbert of New Found Glory. (Note: The band played Warped Tour from June 20 to July 20. The Easycore Tour started on September 11 and finished on October 12. The tour was headlined by New Found Glory and featured International Superheroes of Hardcore, A Day to Remember, Four Year Strong, and Crime in Stereo.) The songs were finished on the latter tour. Gilbert helped to structure the band's songs and also assisted the band with composing "a few really catchy parts". The album's lyrics are similar to their previous efforts, with the band aiming to "keep it as personal and open at the same time", as vocalist Jeremy McKinnon commented. (Note: McKinnon himself likes "to write really open-style lyrics, so you can kind of relate to 'em yourself." The band had "wrote about what we were going through at that time", referring to being home sick.) Speaking of the album's sound, McKinnon said that the band "wanted to make sure it was heavier and poppier" while at the same time trying "to take it to the next level".

== Music and lyrics ==
In the early hours of one morning, McKinnon was driving to Ocala, Florida when the chorus guitar riff to "The Downfall of Us All" came to him, sometime in September 2008. Upon arriving at his mother’s house, he got an acoustic guitar and worked the song out, finishing it within 2 days. (Note: Shortly before playing at a gig, the band practiced a breakdown in A cappella, McKinnon proceeded to say that it would be a good idea to open the album with it, to which his band mates said "Are you retarded? Yeah, we'll see when it's recorded.") The song's lyrics are about pressure when it comes to songwriting and the constant tension of trying to please fans. It was the last song written for the album. "My Life for Hire" was one of the first songs written for the album, but remained unfinished until shortly before recording sessions began. The lyrics refer to the music business and how the band were told that they couldn't "be the band we wanted to be", as McKinnon commented. The title "I'm Made of Wax, Larry, What Are You Made Of?" was a quote that McKinnon "thought was cool", from the movie Night at the Museum, while the lyrics are about getting revenge. "NJ Legion Iced Tea" refers to how someone would feel watching gigs. The title for "Mr. Highway's Thinking About the End" also comes from a movie, The Good Son, while the lyrics are about people attempting to undermine your achievements. "Have Faith in Me" is about trusting other people, and looking after them.

This song took me the longest to write. It took almost a year, but it was another song that kinda stumped me. I really needed this song to say exactly what I wanted, and I finally got it there. We didn't know if it would be on the record right up until the end of recording. I wrote it separate from the band, and I wasn't comfortable changing things. It all worked out in the end, though. I think it's the perfect end to this record.

— Jeremy McKinnon, on "If It Means a Lot to You", 2009

"Welcome to the Family" features a recording of Andrew Wade's heart beat towards the end of the track. The title track, "Homesick", was written as one piece, before being split into two songs, which the band thought didn't work well and changed it back to one song. McKinnon said he was "proud" of the track: "My parents were really happy when they first heard it: My dad is always worried about me and my mom really did ask me to write her some soft songs. I finally did." "Holdin' It Down for the Underground" came about after McKinnon lost two family members and writing the song helped him relieve the pain.

"You Already Know What You Are" is about negative people and music critics, and doing whatever you want no matter what others say. The song's title was a saying from a friend of the band. The title for "Another Song About the Weekend" is a reference to Secret Lives of the Freemasons's album Weekend Warriors (2008), while the lyrics are about "a sick cycle" of "life on the road [...] Every time you're gone, you miss home and when you get home, you miss the road". "If It Means a Lot to You" had been written over the course of a year, and McKinnon said he wrote it about himself. McKinnon described the song as a "great way to end" the album, describing it as one of their "biggest songs."

== Recording ==
In an August 2008 interview with AbsolutePunk, McKinnon said the band were planning to start recording once the tour with New Found Glory had finished, "So Oct & Nov." McKinnon said that having Wade, who had previously worked on the band's other albums on production duties, was a way for the album to have "A Day To Remember-type feel". (Note: Wade produced the band's first album, And Their Name Was Treason (2005), and the bonus tracks on the 2008 reissue of For Those Who Have Heart (2007).) Wade also recorded the band's demos for the album, in the back of a bus. The album itself was recorded at Wade's The Wade Studio, in Ocala, Florida, after the Easycore Tour had finished. Gilbert was touring with New Found Glory in Europe at the time, but with video conferencing he was able to offer input about the record. In September 2008, a demo appeared on the band's MySpace page, entitled "Wax Larry". Documenting the recording process, the band released several webisodes on YouTube, under the name The Real ADTR: Homesick in Ocala, which had been called a spoof of The Real World. The webisodes were aided by director Drew Russ, as guitarist Neil Westfall states: "When he [Drew Russ] was telling us in the beginning that he was getting into video stuff, and we were like 'Well that's kinda crazy 'cause we need a video guy to do these webisodes for us'. And as we started talking he really kinda got our sense of humor". While in the middle of recording Homesick, A Day to Remember released Old Record. (Note: Old Record was a re-release of the group's first album.)

When they first played me the demo of "Downfall," they wanted it to be the first song on the record. Overall, in my opinion, first songs are often the first thing people hear, so it should almost encompass the whole record. [...] I feel if you never heard the band before, and you hear "Downfall," it's a perfect introduction.

— Chad Gilbert, on the making of "The Downfall of Us All", 2009

Homesick was produced by Gilbert, and was mixed by Adam Dutkiewicz of Killswitch Engage, with mixing taking place in December 2008, at Zing Studios. Mastering took place at West West Side Studios, by Alan Douches. The album features three guesting vocalists: Mike Hranica of The Devil Wears Prada on "I'm Made of Wax, Larry, What Are You Made Of?", Vincent Bennett of The Acacia Strain on "Welcome to the Family", and Sierra Kusterbeck of VersaEmerge on "If It Means a Lot to You". The latter featured harmonica played by Dave Guynn. One of the tracks written for Homesick was held over for What Separates Me from You (2010). An instrumental entitled "Money Maker" was also recorded during the sessions, but McKinnon had difficulties with it. He later explained: "when it came down to writing vocal parts [...] I just couldn't get that song done. [...] I think it was the best music for the whole record. The music was just so catchy on its own [...] so we said we will just set this aside for next time around."

== Release and promotion ==
=== Initial releases and line-up changes ===
In 2008, both Homesick and the re-release of the band's first album, as Old Record, were announced, with a further announcement claiming Homesick's release as February 17, 2009. After being moved up the schedule, the album's release date became February 3 for the US. (Note: The album was leaked two and a half weeks before release and McKinnon "was pretty upset when that happened".) On January 6, 2009, the track list of the album was revealed. In mid-January, the song "Welcome to the Family" was put on the band's Myspace profile, (Note: The reason for this choice was to show the band's older fans how they haven't changed, in terms of sound from For Those Who Have Heart to Homesick.) with "The Downfall of Us All" being added on January 26. The following day, the song "NJ Legion Iced Tea" was released as the first single. Homesick was released on February 3 in the US. The cover art, designed by Dan Mumford based on an idea by McKinnon, is an interpretation of different paths in life, and how one road can change a person's life. In February and March, the band went on a tour of the UK and Europe alongside For the Fallen Dreams and Azriel. The second single was "The Downfall of Us All" and the music video was released on March 3. Between mid-March and early May, the band supported the Devil Wears Prada on their headlining tour of the US. "The Downfall of Us All" was released to radio on May 26.

We came up with some pretty cool stuff. There's like a hidden code in there, a key to figure out what the sign says and we just tried to have fun with it.

— Jeremy McKinnon, on the album art, 2009

A live video of the band performing "Mr. Highway's Thinking About the End" was included in an episode of Victory's VicTorV. (Note: VicTorV is Victory's free in-house video program that is produced on a monthly basis, it features exclusive content from the label's artists.) For subsequent tours in promotion of Homesick, the band had a line-up change adding Four Letter Lie guitarist Kevin Skaff and dropping Tom Denney, the latter of whom wanted to settle down, but was still working with the band behind the scenes. Between late June and late August, the band performed on the Warped Tour. Following this, the group appeared at the Reading and Leeds Festivals in the UK. In September and October 2009, the band went on a US tour with Parkway Drive, In Fear and Faith and I See Stars. A video of the band performing "I'm Made of Wax, Larry, What Are You Made Of?", which was filmed on the Warped Tour, was added to the band's MySpace profile on October 16, 2009. It was included as a DVD trailer on their profile, which people mistook as the song's actual music video. In December, the band released a Christmas song, "Right Where You Want Me to Be", on their MySpace account.

=== Music videos and live performances ===
Also in December, the music video for "I'm Made of Wax, Larry, What Are You Made Of?" was filmed, directed by Dan Dobi. In early March 2010 the band announced via their Twitter account that the video was set for release, with a date of March 16. This was further confirmed a few days later, with some fans being able to view it before its release. A delay in releasing it occurred as the band were trying to negotiate with MTV, as Westfall commented: "I think it's more important to have them [MTV] on board, instead of just putting it on, like, YouTube." "Have Faith in Me" was released as a radio single on March 2, 2010. (Note: The song's music video was filmed in late-March 2010.) The video for "I'm Made of Wax, Larry, What Are You Made Of?" had its television premiere on MTV on March 16. The music video was based on an idea from a friend Kyle Crawford, as McKinnon said: "He was like, 'Hey, you should totally make a video where you guys are playing kickball and you play a bunch of kids and just kick the s*** out of them?" I was like, "That is a great idea. Let's look into it.'" (Note: The idea for the video was later expanded due to a brainstorming session by Drew Russ.) Asked why it was the band's next music video, Westfall said "it stands out compared to the other songs" as "it's a harder song." The song was also released as a radio single.

The band had performed acoustic versions of both "Homesick" and "Have Faith in Me" before a show in early April, for 98 Rock, and again, for KROQ, a few months later. The band also played "Have Faith in Me" acoustically for MTV, which was posted online mid-April. At the beginning of May 2010, the band asked fans to name their next tour, which was shortly afterwards named as Toursick. The band started the first of The AP Sessions for Alternative Press on June 30, performing "Homesick" and "Have Faith in Me". The music video for "Have Faith in Me", directed by Mark Staubach, was released on July 14, receiving its world premiere on MTV.

== Further releases and song appearances ==
A re-issue of Homesick was announced on September 13, 2009, and released on October 27, with the original track listing intact, but adding acoustic versions of "Homesick" and "Another Song About the Weekend", and 9 live tracks from a performance in Switzerland, which was filmed during their European tour. The acoustic tracks were recorded at The Wade Studio from September 10 to September 21. Westfall said the band wasn't going to re-issue the album "unless it's worth the fans' while." The album, along with For Those Who Have Heart and Attack of the Killer B-Sides (2010), had a reissue on vinyl, in 2011. Three songs have featured on various artist compilations: the acoustic version of "Homesick" was released on the Victory Records Fall Sampler 2010, "I'm Made of Wax, Larry, What are You Made Of?" on SideOneDummy's Warped Tour 2009 Tour Compilation, and "The Downfall of Us All" on Modern Rock Radio's Promo Only: Modern Rock Radio (July 2009) and 3Wise's Soundwave 2012. "NJ Legion Iced Tea" is available as downloadable content for Guitar Hero World Tour. The songs "The Downfall of Us All", "Have Faith in Me", "I'm Made of Wax, Larry, What Are You Made Of?" and "If It Means a Lot to You" are available as downloadable content for Rock Band. "I'm Made of Wax, Larry, What Are You Made Of?" had been added at the request of the band's fans. Another vinyl reissue was announced on July 30, 2013, and released on August 6, 2013. "If It Means a Lot to You" was released to radio on September 29, 2014.

== Critical reception and legacy ==
Thomas Nassiff of AbsolutePunk called Homesick "a record that is honest and entertaining", despite how "repetitive" and "dense it may be". Nassiff went on to say that the album wouldn't appeal to the public, but it would be "welcomed with open arms" by the band's fans. When referring to the album's lyrics, Nassiff called the album "a concept one", with a theme of "the glory of being a musician", which encompasses having to be away from home for a period of time. "The Downfall of Us All", as Nassiff put it, "gets the listener psyched for the rest of the album." Rock on Request reviewer Anthony Avina furthered this comment by naming the songs "Welcome to the Family" and the title track as examples of the band showing off their "wide range of talent while producing a harmonious album" that the band's fans "will instantly fall in love with." Avina noted the album had "a unique sound that has elements" from other bands such as Chiodos. Petteri Pertola, for Rockfreaks.net, "appreciate[s] the way these guys fuse metalcore and pop punk seamlessly together", adding that "many songs are plagued by an overtly formulaic approach, but when it works, [...] Homesick is one of the catchiest listens you'll experience this year." Punknews.org reviewer Elliot said the album had an "undeniable quality", that is "melodic competence." He viewed the a cappella intro to "The Downfall of Us All" as being "a little gimmicky", while "Have Faith in Me" was called a tribute to Blink-182. Despite noting that three of the songs "stray" from a format that the other songs on the album share, he referred to them as being "not very impressive."

AllMusic reviewer James Christopher Monger said "The Downfall of Us All" would gain an extra "life in countless montages on MTV reality shows and 30-second cola commercials." Monger said that the album consisted "of perfectly executed and fairly standard clean vocal post-hardcore emo-pop" which shows the "limitations of the genre." Monger called the backing vocals "exciting at first", but felt that they "eventually dissolve into the waves of distortion mid-album", becoming an "audio equivalent of an energy drink crash." The final track, "If It Means a Lot to You", as Monger noted, was different from the preceding tracks, as they were "deafening, ultimately forgettable, over-compressed slabs of twentysomething angst."

=== Accolades ===
Homesick was voted by fans as number 1 on Kill Your Stereo's Album of the Year 2009. Rock Sound, in 2012, ranked the album at number 82 on their list of the greatest 101 albums of the past 15 years. In 2024, John Hill of Loudwire named it the best metalcore album of 2009.

== Commercial performance ==
The album charted at number 21 on the Billboard 200, number 1 on Top Independent Albums, number 2 on Hard Rock Albums, number 15 on Digital Albums, and number 5 on the Alternative Albums charts. It sold 22,000 copies within its first week and reached 200,000 copies by July 2010. The album charted at number 165 in the UK. "Have Faith in Me" charted at number 40 on the Billboard Modern Rock Tracks chart. In February 2014, "The Downfall of Us All" was certified gold, and in September, "If It Means a Lot to You" was certified. In July 2015, the album was certified silver in the UK, after selling 60,000 copies in the UK. In March 2016, Homesick was certified gold in the US. "Have Faith in Me" was certified gold in April 2017. In August, Homesick was certified gold in Canada. after selling 40,000 copies in that country.

== Track listing ==
=== Original release ===
All songs written by A Day to Remember. All lyrics written by Jeremy McKinnon, except "Have Faith in Me" by McKinnon and Jason Lancaster.

No.	Title	Length
1.	"The Downfall of Us All"	3:29
2.	"My Life for Hire"	3:33
3.	"I'm Made of Wax, Larry, What Are You Made Of?" (featuring Mike Hranica)	3:00
4.	"NJ Legion Iced Tea"	3:31
5.	"Mr. Highway's Thinking About the End"	4:15
6.	"Have Faith in Me"	3:08
7.	"Welcome to the Family" (featuring Vincent Bennett)	2:59
8.	"Homesick"	3:56
9.	"Holdin' It Down for the Underground"	3:23
10.	"You Already Know What You Are"	1:27
11.	"Another Song About the Weekend"	3:45
12.	"If It Means a Lot to You" (featuring Sierra Kusterbeck)	4:03
Total length:		40:29

=== Special edition ===
Bonus tracks
No.	Title	Length
13.	"Homesick" (acoustic)	4:07
14.	"Another Song About the Weekend" (acoustic)	3:42

=== Special edition DVD ===
Homesick: Special Edition Deluxe DVD
No.	Title	Length
1.	"The Downfall of Us All" (Live at Greenfield Festival in Interlaken, Switzerland on June 13, 2009)	3:57
2.	"Fast Forward to 2012" (Live at Greenfield Festival in Interlaken, Switzerland on June 13, 2009)	1:46
3.	"My Life for Hire" (Live at Greenfield Festival in Interlaken, Switzerland on June 13, 2009)	3:56
4.	"The Danger in Starting a Fire" (Live at Greenfield Festival in Interlaken, Switzerland on June 13, 2009)	3:37
5.	"Mr. Highway's Thinking About the End" (Live at Greenfield Festival in Interlaken, Switzerland on June 13, 2009)	3:23
6.	"I'm Made of Wax, Larry, What Are You Made Of?" (Live at Greenfield Festival in Interlaken, Switzerland on June 13, 2009)	3:47
7.	"A Shot in the Dark" (Live at Greenfield Festival in Interlaken, Switzerland on June 13, 2009)	4:42
8.	"You Should Have Killed Me When You Had the Chance" (Live at Greenfield Festival in Interlaken, Switzerland on June 13, 2009)	3:41
9.	"The Plot to Bomb the Panhandle" (Live at Greenfield Festival in Interlaken, Switzerland on June 13, 2009)	4:17
10.	"Creative Control" (The Homesick – DVD)
11.	"Intro" (The Homesick – DVD)
12.	"On the Road Again" (The Homesick – DVD)
13.	"Ahoy! Crew Members" (The Homesick – DVD)
14.	"Fast Forward to 2012 (Live in Tucson, AZ)" (The Homesick – DVD)	1:44
15.	"Corn Hole" (The Homesick – DVD)
16.	"Warped Day One" (The Homesick – DVD)
17.	"Hired Help" (The Homesick – DVD)
18.	"Good Morning San Francisco" (The Homesick – DVD)
19.	"Downfall of Us All (Live in San Francisco, CA)" (The Homesick – DVD)	3:56
20.	"Neil Gets Inked" (The Homesick – DVD)
21.	"Hot Bagger" (The Homesick – DVD)
22.	"Mr. Highway's Thinking About the End (Live in Ventura, CA)" (The Homesick – DVD)	3:49
23.	"Super Fans" (The Homesick – DVD)
24.	"I'm Made of Wax Larry, What Are You Made (Live in Ventura, CA)" (The Homesick – DVD)	3:15
25.	"Bottom of the Totem Pole" (The Homesick – DVD)
26.	"Viva Las Vegas" (The Homesick – DVD)
27.	"My Life for Hire (Live in Las Vegas, NV)" (The Homesick – DVD)	3:25
28.	"Almost Home" (The Homesick – DVD)
29.	"The Danger in Starting a Fire (Live in Orlando, FL)" (The Homesick – DVD)	3:31
30.	"Big Boss's Magical Realm" (The Homesick – DVD)
31.	"Nail in the Coffin" (The Homesick – DVD)
32.	"The Downfall of Us All (Music Video)" (Bonus DVD Features)
33.	"The Downfall of Us All (Making Of)" (Bonus DVD Features)
34.	"Mr. Highway's Thinking About the End (Music Video)" (Bonus DVD Features)
35.	"Since U Been Gone (Music Video)" (Bonus DVD Features)
36.	"Homesick Sessions (Episodes 1–5)" (Bonus DVD Features)

== Personnel ==
Personnel per Special Edition booklet.

A Day to Remember

- Jeremy McKinnon – lead vocals
- Alex Shelnutt – drums
- Neil Westfall – rhythm guitar
- Joshua Woodard – bass guitar
- Tom Denney – lead guitar

Guest musicians

- Mike Hranica – guest vocals on "I'm Made of Wax, Larry, What Are You Made Of?"
- Vincent Bennett – guest vocals on "Welcome to the Family"
- Sierra Kusterbeck – guest vocals on "If It Means a Lot to You"
- Josh Freese – additional drums
- Dave Guynn – harmonica on "If It Means a Lot to You"

Production

- Chad Gilbert – producer
- A Day to Remember – producer
- Andrew Wade, Chris Rubey, and Jason Lancaster ("Have Faith in Me") – pre-production
- Adam Dutkiewicz – mixing
- Alan Douches – mastering
- A Day to Remember – art direction and concept
- Dan Mumford – original artwork
- Gage Young – photography
- Phill Mamula – band photos
- Mike C. Hardcore – special edition logo
- Doublej – layout / deluxe packaging design

== Charts ==
=== Weekly charts ===
Chart (2009)	Peak Position
UK Album Chart	165
US Billboard 200	21
US Billboard Alternative Albums Chart	5
US Billboard Digital Albums Chart	21
US Billboard Hard Rock Albums Chart	2
US Billboard Independent Albums Chart	1
US Billboard Rock Albums Chart	7
US Billboard Top Tastemaker Albums	4

=== Year-end charts ===
Chart (2009)	Position
US Billboard Hard Rock Albums Year-end	50
US Billboard Independent Albums Year-end	17

== Certifications ==
Region	Certification	Certified units/sales
Canada (Music Canada)	Gold	40,000^{‡}
United Kingdom (BPI)	Gold	100,000^{‡}
United States (RIAA)	Gold	500,000^{‡}
^{‡} Sales+streaming figures based on certification alone.
