= Halos for Heros, Dirt for the Dead =

EP by A Day to Remember
- Released: Late 2004
- Recorded: Skylab Recording Studios, Gainesville, Florida
- Genre: Pop-punk; metalcore; screamo
- Length: 18:00

A Day to Remember chronology
| Halos for Heros, Dirt for the Dead (2004) | And Their Name Was Treason (2005) |

Halos for Heros, Dirt for the Dead is the debut EP by the American rock band A Day to Remember.

== Recording and release ==
The EP was recorded at Skylab Recording Studios in Gainesville, Florida. The material on the EP was written in vocalist Jeremy McKinnon's garage, and was recorded all in one day live-in-studio. Samples of tracks titled "Camo", "Second Guess" and "Heartless" were posted online around the same time.

The band self-released the EP, it was limited to 2,000 copies. The EP helped the band get signed to Indianola. In 2012, guitarist Neil Westfall said the band had no plans to re-release the EP. A music video for "Breathe Hope in Me" was directed by Daniel Harrison and filmed during the band's high school days. The video was leaked onto the Internet in April 2011.

== Track listing ==
All tracks are written by A Day to Remember.

| No. | Title | Length |
|---|---|---|
| 1. | "Breathe Hope in Me" | 4:08 |
| 2. | "If Looks Could Kill... Then You'd Be Dead" | 3:22 |
| 3. | "Last Request" | 3:46 |
| 4. | "This Sun Has Set" | 2:40 |
| 5. | "Westfall" | 4:04 |

== Personnel ==
- Tom Denney – lead guitar
- Bobby Scruggs – drums
- Jeremy McKinnon – vocals
- Neil Westfall – rhythm guitar
- Joshua Woodard – bass
