= For Those Who Have Heart =

Studio album by A Day to Remember
- Released: January 22, 2007
- Recorded: October–November 2006
- Studios: Zing Studios, Westfield, Massachusetts
- Genres: Metalcore; pop-punk; post-hardcore
- Length: 42:42
- Label: Victory
- Producers: Eric Arena; A Day to Remember

A Day to Remember chronology
And Their Name Was Treason (2005)	For Those Who Have Heart (2007)	Homesick (2009)

Reissue slipcase cover

For Those Who Have Heart is the second studio album by the American rock band A Day to Remember, and their first for Victory. It was released on January 22, 2007 by Victory. For the album, the band had a line-up change swapping drummer Bobby Scruggs for Alex Shelnutt. It charted at number 17 on the Heatseekers Album Chart in the U.S. The music video for "The Plot to Bomb the Panhandle" was released a month later. Several of the album's songs appeared on the band's Myspace profile before the release. Recorded and mixed at Zing Studios by producer Eric Arena, the album was re-released in February 2008, with additional tracks and a bonus DVD. The DVD featured a performance of the band live at the Capitol, in the band's hometown, Ocala, Florida. The music video for "The Danger in Starting a Fire" was released in the same month, and the music video for "Since U Been Gone", which had been streamed on the band's Myspace, was released in July. For Those Who Have Heart was generally well received by music critics.

== Background and recording ==
=== Leaving Indianola and arrival of Alex Shelnutt ===
After releasing their first album, And Their Name Was Treason (2005), A Day to Remember went on a tour of the U.S. in summer 2005. As rhythm guitarist Neil Westfall said, Indianola "didn't have money to support a band growing [...] so we wanted to find someone who could support us and willing to do video, like recording budget, working with a producer, studio we wanted to work with, whatever. Like Indianola couldn't do that."

Drummer Bobby Scruggs told the band he wasn't going to continue with the band, and on January 27, 2006 it was posted online that the band were looking for a new drummer, for the start of a tour in mid-February. Eventually, bassist Joshua Woodard and Westfall recruited drummer Alex Shelnutt only three days before going on tour. Upon being asked, Shelnutt's response was "Ask my mom", as he was 15 at the time. Upon Shelnutt joining, Westfall said the group "started sounding like a real professional band. He gave us something we never had before."

=== Signing with Victory Records and recording ===
The whole record was about pretty much standing up for yourself and, a lot of people do really shitty things to you. That's what was happening to us, a lot, and that [...] you shouldn't back down from people.

— Jeremy McKinnon, upon being asked what message the album was trying to convey, 2007

Woodard was put in touch with a representative from record label Victory Records. Victory auditioned the band in June, and following a week-long worth of phone calls, the group were told of Victory's interest in signing them up.

The band was reported to have signed a deal with Victory in July. An announcement of Victory signing the band was released on August 11, 2006. Demos were recorded by Matt Finch at 318 Studios, with pre-production at The Wade Studios in Ocala by Andrew Wade. Recording began in October at Zing Studios, Westfield with producer Eric Arena. Arena also mixed the tracks. Alan Douches mastered the record at West West Side Music, New Windsor.

== Release ==
=== Initial releases ===
Prior to the release of the album, a few tracks were made available for streaming via the band's Myspace: "The Plot to Bomb the Panhandle", "Fast Forward to 2012", "The Danger in Starting a Fire", "A Shot in the Dark" and "Show 'Em the Ropes". Cover art was unveiled on November 30, 2006. A commercial to promote the album was released on January 4, 2007. Pre-orders were taken starting January 16. The album was released in the US on January 22, (Note: U.S. Victory VR337) while the UK release occurred a week later, on January 29. On March 8, the band released the music video for "The Plot to Bomb the Panhandle", which featured Ron Jeremy. The video was filmed in Los Angeles. After being asked how they got Jeremy to appear, McKinnon said "It was pretty much some that we were kicking around. We were kicking around different people and I think, Tony threw that out there, out of nowhere and we were like 'That'd be cool, that'd be funny, people will be into that.'".

A few days later, the band appeared at Victory's showcase event at SXSW, on March 14. In May, the band toured alongside Drop Dead, Gorgeous on their US west coast tour, prior to a trek with Alesana. In July and August, the band supported The Sleeping on their U.S. tour. In September, it was announced that the album had sold 20,000 copies. In early-to-mid October, the group supported Silverstein on their headlining tour of the U.S. From late October to early December, the group went on the 2007 edition of the Victory Tour. A live video of "Monument" appeared exclusively on Punkrockvids on December 5.

=== Re-release of the album ===
On February 4, 2008, a re-recording of "You Should've Killed Me When You Had the Chance" was posted on the band's Myspace. The album was reissued on February 19. (Note: U.S. Victory VR443) The reissue has different cover artwork, as well as four bonus tracks – the track listing of which was revealed on February 1. The bonus tracks are: a new song recorded especially for the reissue, titled "Why Walk on Water When We've Got Boats", two re-recorded songs that were originally featured on their debut album, And Their Name Was Treason – "Heartless" and the aforementioned "You Should've Killed Me When You Had the Chance" – and a cover of the Kelly Clarkson song, "Since U Been Gone". The new tracks were recorded at The Wade Studio. In addition to these bonus tracks, is a bonus DVD with footage of A Day to Remember's performance in Ocala, two music videos, as well as behind the scenes footage of recording and commentary on the re-release. The re-release came about after Victory asked the band whether or not if they were going to do a new album. Commenting about Victory's inquiry about a new album, Woodard "We weren't ready to do it [a new album], so they asked if, you know, we were interested in doing a re-release with new artwork and adding some new songs."

About the re-recording of the old songs, Westfall said "We've made a lot of changes to these songs that we play live [...] and now we're getting a chance to record it, so the people that don't get to see us live can hear it and appreciate it for what it is." On the new tracks, producer Andrew Wade said "I think this new stuff that we're recording is really gonna blow a lot of kids away. [...] [The re-recordings] just sound amazing, they all sound like completely different songs, and the new song is serious." About the new song, "Why Walk on Water When We've Got Boats", the band wanted to do a fast-paced song. McKinnon admitted the band "kinda just winged it. But we had some little ideas from being on tour and messing around." Woodard said about inspiration for the tempo of the song: "We've all been listening to a lot of faster stuff like Comeback Kid and stuff like that and I don't know and just sitting here one day 'let's write a fast song'." "Since U Been Gone" had appeared on the band's Myspace account, on September 21, 2007, as free for download. "Since U Been Gone" had overdubs added to it especially for the release on the For Those Who Have Heart reissue.

The band chose "Since U Been Gone" because, as McKinnon stated, "we thought would embody what we are as a band by taking like, the poppiest thing ever and still making it hard enough to where kids fight at our shows over it." The performance included on the DVD was filmed at the Capitol, a building that used to be a bank, in Ocala, on January 5, 2008. The performance was filmed by Dan Dobi, with audio recorded by Wade. In February and March 2008, the band went on a US tour alongside Silverstein, the Devil Wears Prada, Protest the Hero and Four Letter Lie. The music video for "The Danger in Starting a Fire" was posted online on February 29, 2008. In early April, the band appeared at the Bamboozle Left festival. On April 16, 2008, it was announced that the band would be filming a music video for "Since U Been Gone" on April 29 and 30. Five days later, it was mentioned online that the video's director was Don Tyler. In June and July, the band performed on the 2008 edition of Warped Tour. The music video for "Since U Been Gone" appeared on YouTube on July 23. In September and October, the band went on a US tour with New Found Glory. The re-recorded version of "Heartless" appeared on the band's MySpace profile in October 2008.

=== Further appearances ===
"The Plot to Bomb the Panhandle" was included on Victory's Victory Records Label Sampler, from 2009. "The Plot to Bomb the Panhandle" was available as downloadable content in the video game Rock Band 3 via the Rock Band Network. The band played an acoustic version of "Monument" and two tracks from Homesick (2009) for KROQ on August 3, 2010. The album, along with Homesick and Attack of the Killer B-Sides (2010), had a reissue on vinyl, in 2011. Another vinyl reissue was released, in 3 different colors, in 2013. (Note: Solid black: VR337-LP-SLBKVN; solid red: VR337-LP-SLREVN; clear with black smoke: VR337-LP-CSCLBK)

== Reception ==
The original edition peaked at number 17 on the Billboard Top Heatseekers chart, while the reissue charted at number 43 on the Top Independent Albums chart. Russ Hockenbury of AbsolutePunk said the album "improved on every level" from their previous album, And Their Name Was Treason. McKinnon's vocals were noted by Hockenbury as "the greatest improvement". AllMusic reviewer Corey Apar spoke of "Fast Forward to 2012" as being an appropriate opening track that summarized a "display of the band's volatile persona; it launches forth in melodic hardcore mode before quickly dropping into death snarling and sludgy riffing". Apar also said that the combination endures "in varying levels" throughout the rest of the album. For PopMatters, Andrew Blackie had written the album was a mix of "death metal grunts with the brash melodies of pop-punk". Speaking of "The Plot to Bomb the Panhandle", Blackie said the song had "a Green Day sensibility to it", with music that "fitted together with class and precision" helped by that of Shelnutt.

Punknews.org contributor Tyler Barrett said "Fast Forward to 2012" was "incredibly promising" but within "mere seconds the melodic punk is replaced by vocals that sound like a post-Taco Bell burrito belch". About the band playing "The Price We Pay", he also said the group had fallen "equally flat with their attempt at acoustic emo pop" with "horrifically banal lyrics". Rolling Stone magazine said the album was "among the 40 most important new releases of the month".

== Track listing ==
All lyrics and music by A Day to Remember.

No.	Title	Length
1.	"Fast Forward to 2012"	1:33
2.	"Speak of the Devil"	3:24
3.	"The Danger in Starting a Fire"	3:03
4.	"The Plot to Bomb the Panhandle"	4:04
5.	"Monument"	3:48
6.	"The Price We Pay"	2:43
7.	"Colder Than My Heart, If You Can Imagine"	4:03
8.	"Show 'Em the Ropes"	3:23
9.	"A Shot in the Dark"	3:52
10.	"Here's to the Past"	3:59
11.	"I Heard It's the Softest Thing Ever"	4:06
12.	"Start the Shooting"	4:44
Total length:		42:42

Other editions

Reissue CD bonus tracks
No.	Title	Length
13.	"Heartless" (Re-recorded from And Their Name Was Treason)	3:00
14.	"You Should've Killed Me When You Had the Chance" (Re-recorded from And Their Name Was Treason)	3:40
15.	"Since U Been Gone" (Kelly Clarkson cover)	3:18
16.	"Why Walk on Water When We've Got Boats"	1:54
Total length:		53:23

Reissue bonus DVD
No.	Title	Length
1.	"Fast Forward to 2012" (live performance)	2:27
2.	"Heartless" (live performance)	2:54
3.	"A Shot in the Dark" (live performance)	4:11
4.	"1958" (live performance)	4:15
5.	"Why Walk on Water When We've Got Boats" (live performance)	2:00
6.	"Since U Been Gone" (live performance)	3:06
7.	"Monument" (live performance)	3:48
8.	"The Danger in Starting a Fire" (live performance)	2:57
9.	"You Should've Killed Me When You Had the Chance" (live performance)	3:45
10.	"The Plot to Bomb the Panhandle" (live performance)	4:28
11.	"The Danger in Starting a Fire" (music video)	3:04
12.	"The Plot to Bomb the Panhandle" (music video)	4:09
13.	"Behind the Scenes in Ocala" (featurette)	20:02

== Personnel ==
Personnel per reissue edition booklet.

A Day to Remember

- Jeremy McKinnon – vocals
- Joshua Woodard – bass
- Tom Denney – lead guitar
- Alex Shelnutt – drums
- Neil Westfall – rhythm guitar

Production

- Eric Arena and A Day to Remember – producers
- Eric Arena – recording and mixing
- Alan Douches – mastering
- Chris Fortin and Joe Mahoney – additional engineers
- Andrew Wade – recording (tracks 13–16)
- Mike Cortda – illustrations
- Jeremy Saffer – photographer
- Kyle Looney and Gage Young – live/band photographers
- Doublej – layout
- Andrew Wade – pre-production
- Matt Finch – demoing

DVD personnel

- Dan Dobi – director
- Dan Dobi, Alex Purifoy, Wes Armstrong, Kurt Hudson, John Heppe, Brice Miller, Matt Stanek, Drew Russ and Marc Lynch – camera operators
- Marc Lynch – jib operator
- Terry Rabinowitz, Matt Conrad and Zach Lyons – production assistants
- Andrew Wade – recording
- Drew Russ – Behind the Scenes footage
- Andrew House and Doublej – DVD menu designers
- Sean Sutton – DVD author
