= And Their Name Was Treason =

- Original album artwork by Caleb

Studio album by A Day to Remember
- Released: May 10, 2005
- Recorded: 2004
- Studio: Andrew Wade's bedroom in Ocala, Florida
- Genres: Metalcore; Post-hardcore; Pop punk
- Length: 30:51
- Label: Indianola
- Producer: Andrew Wade

A Day to Remember chronology
Halos for Heros, Dirt for the Dead (2004)	And Their Name Was Treason (2005)	For Those Who Have Heart (2007)

Old Record
- Original album artwork by Mike C. Hardcore

And Their Name Was Treason is the debut studio album by the American rock band A Day to Remember, released on May 10, 2005 through Indianola Records. It followed their second self-released EP, which was produced the same year. The album was the band's only release under Indianola; its success led the group sign to Victory Records. Several songs on the album were written during the band members' teenage years. Recorded in the producer's bedroom, the album contains audio excerpts from several films. The band toured in the United States to help promote the album. The album has since sold over 10,000 copies. A re-recorded version of the album, titled Old Record, was released in October 2008 by Victory. The band members later admitted that they were forced to do the re-recording at the request of label owner Tony Brummel and were given two days to do so which resulted in them only re-recording the instrumentals and leaving the vocals as it was on the original album. The reissue charted at number 16 on the Heatseekers Album Chart in the U.S.

== Background ==
A Day to Remember formed when guitarist Tom Denney asked Jeremy McKinnon if he would like to join the band as a vocalist. The pair hung out with drummer Bobby Scruggs, who later joined the band. During this period, both Denney and Scruggs were already in a band; Denney was in 2 Days 2 Late, while McKinnon played in All for Nothing. The trio wrote a song which McKinnon said "was better than everything our other bands had come up with". Shortly afterwards the trio decided to form a band which was called End of An Era in its first week of existence. The name was inspired by a movie listing in a TV guide found in Denney's home. The band hated the name and one day a former drummer joined the band after they had left their previous band had the name A Day to Remember with him and the band decided to use that name instead. The drummer was soon kicked out of the band.

Scruggs' friend stayed in the band for a short period. He was fired after several instances of walking off stage mid-performance. According to Denney, the group's original bassist and rhythm guitarist "didn't work out". They were subsequently replaced by guitarist Neil Westfall and bassist Joshua Woodard. At the time, Westfall was also in 2 Days 2 Late, while Woodard was a fan of the band. A Day to Remember practiced in McKinnon's garage, who was living with his parents at the time. The band released an independent EP, Halos for Heros, Dirt for the Dead, which helped them secure a recording contract. The EP contained an early version of "If Looks Could Kill", titled "If Looks Could Kill...then You'd Be Dead".

== Writing and recording ==
In terms of fun, I would say our first record and I would say that because we didn't care. I mean, there was absolutely no thought, there was no revision; we were a local band and we just wrote music that didn't make sense and it doesn't go together at all, so that was definitely the easiest one to do, because we didn't really give a crap what it sounded like.

— Jeremy McKinnon, upon being asked which album was the most fun to record, 2011

According to McKinnon, And Their Name Was Treason was recorded "probably within 3 days", in Andrew Wade's bedroom at his parents house (credited in the album booklet as The Wade Studio). The members later said they had "no idea" what they were doing when they were recording the album. The album features samples from various films throughout; "Intro" features a sample from the film Donnie Darko, "1958" features a sample from the film The Boondock Saints and "Sound the Alarm" features audio from Shaun of the Dead. Speaking about the lyrical themes on the record, guitarist Tom Denney said that they were "all experiences that [singer] Jeremy has had, its all based on life".

A few of the songs were written by the band when they were teenagers, such as "1958", "Heartless", and "You Should Have Killed Me When You Had the Chance", the latter being one of the first songs that the band ever wrote. "1958" was written about a temporary drummer, who threatened to go McKinnon's parents house with a baseball bat; the numbers "1958" being the last four digits of his phone number. Denney added that the song "talks about family and us sticking together no matter what."

== Release ==
=== Initial release and touring ===
Record label Indianola were introduced to the band by their PureVolume account, which was shown to the label by a mutual friend of the band. On February 9, 2005, the band got signed to Indianola, which McKinnon later said that the band thought "was the biggest shit in the world". On the same day, And Their Name Was Treason was announced for release later that year. Samples of three tracks, "1958", "Casablanca Sucked Anyways", and "If Looks Could Kill", were posted on the website of The Wade Studio prior to release. Since its release on May 10, 2005, (Note: U.S. Indianola IND1024) And Their Name Was Treason sold over 10,000 copies in the U.S. with little advertising and no media exposure. The album's success helped the band sign to Victory for their following album. The group toured in the U.S. in the summer of 2005 to promote the record, along with other bands such as Caldwell and Orion. (Note: The tour lasted from June 20 to July 19; Orion joined the tour from June 30.) The tour continued throughout October and November with Foreknown and Blessed by a Broken Heart as supporting acts. The group's travel vehicles were financed by McKinnon's parents.

Shortly before the beginning of one tour, Scruggs told the band he wasn't going, so Woodard and Westfall recruited Alex Shelnutt. (Note: Scruggs would later become a member of Paddock Park, a project spearheaded by Brian Calzini and produced by Denney.) Upon being asked, Shelnutt's response was "Ask my mom", as he was 15 at the time. "A Second Glance" had a music video, directed by Reel Players. It was included on the promotional Welcome to Indianola Records album. The band left Indianola as they thought the label would not be able to take them "to the next level", as McKinnon commented.

=== Reissue – Old Record ===
In 2008, both Old Record and the band's newest release at that time, Homesick (2009), were announced. The artwork for Old Record was released a month prior, and then the track list was posted online before the album's release on October 28, 2008, through Victory. (Note: U.S. Victory VR494-CD) The re-release features different cover art, a rearranged track listing and re-recorded instrumentation. Old Record charted at number 16 on the Top Heatseekers Albums chart in the U.S. The re-release came about due to the album's later unavailability in stores, and as McKinnon commented, the band wanted "people to be able to get it". "Your Way with Words Is Through Silence" was streamed as part of Distrophonix's various artists compilation Screaming to Stop Sex Slavery in July 2009.

...what [Victory-owner, Tony Brummel] would do is say, "I'm going to give you guys this much money to do this," and then we'd come back with, "well, we don't really want to do that because we would have like two days at home to re-record this entire album" -- and he told us, "you have to do this or I will end your career."

— Jeremy McKinnon, about Victory making the band do things they didn't want to do, 2013

On December 6, 2010, two colored vinyl editions of Old Record were released. In an interview with USA Today in 2011, McKinnon said that the band "had a bunch of people tell us we'd sold out — and that was our first album" when they had released And Their Name Was Treason. On July 2, 2013, Victory announced that Old Record was to be reissued again on vinyl, in 3 different colors, from July 9: standard black, and limited edition copies of both pink and clear with black smoke. In an October 2013 interview, McKinnon revealed the band had to re-record the whole album in a couple of days due to pressure from Victory-owner Tony Brummel. McKinnon was "absolutely [...] ashamed" it was released as he thought the band had "butchered it. Because it was two days [recording]."

== Reception ==
Chris H. of AbsolutePunk said the band has made "a big impression" with its debut album and called it "the heaviest" release in their catalogue. According to him, "1958" was "the heaviest song on the album", while "Heartless" was nearly a "perfect way to start the album" with its fast guitars and steady drums pace. Allmusic's Eduardo Rivadavia mentioned that the album was full of "bite-sized songs" which are combination of "extremely melodic chorus sections" and "depths-of-hell Cookie Monster growling". Rivadavia went on to say the album is not "better or worse than a thousand emocore albums released during a 12-month span". Writing for Scene Point Blank, Kevin Fitzpatrick said the album was "a very frustrating listen" featuring "eighth grade lovesick lyrics". Although Fitzpatrick said that the guitar work on the album was "passable", he panned Bobby Scruggs' drumming for being "sloppy" at times.

Allschools writer Björn, mentioned that the band did the album "really well and mosh[ed] like crazy", despite adding that the growls "suffered, grieved [and were] sometimes a little desperate". Fake Train reviewer Ken Hawk said the album was maybe "one of the best fusions of metallic hardcore and melodic punk-rock", continuing with how the band were able to "spring back-and-forth between booming chugga mosh breakdowns, melodic guitar thrashing, and driving upbeat rock…flawlessly" in an easy manner. Scene It All's Anson said the band "finally succeeded in rightfully earning that title" of "bridg[ing] the gap between hardcore and emo". McKinnon's voice was praised as using "his voice extremely well [...] He manages to give the lowest screams and yet still can hit the highest notes when it comes to singing. A feat, most singers can't manage."

Reviewing the album's reissue for AbsolutePunk, Blake Solomon wrote that Old Record wasn't "anything to go nuts over" if the listener already owned the original release. He felt that the lyrics were "a bit more honest" compared to its follow-up For Those Who Have Heart (2007). Rock Sound added "1958" to their unnumbered list of 50 Songs of Hate.

== Track listing ==
All songs written by A Day to Remember.

No.	Title	Length
1.	"Intro"	0:42
2.	"Heartless"	2:46
3.	"Your Way with Words Is Through Silence"	3:54
4.	"A Second Glance"	2:53
5.	"Casablanca Sucked Anyways"	2:57
6.	"You Should Have Killed Me When You Had the Chance"	3:34
7.	"If Looks Could Kill"	3:18
8.	"You Had Me at Hello"	4:29
9.	"1958"	4:29
10.	"Sound the Alarm"	1:49
Total length:		30:51

Old Record track listing
No.	Title	Length
1.	"Intro '05"	0:35
2.	"Heart Less"	2:53
3.	"A 2nd Glance"	2:54
4.	"Nineteen Fifty Eight"	4:38
5.	"If Looks Could Kill..."	3:18
6.	"U Had Me @ Hello"	4:35
7.	"Casablanca Sucked Anyways."	2:57
8.	"U Should of Killed Me When U Had the Chance"	3:34
9.	"Your Way with Words Is Through Silence!"	3:55
10.	"Sound the Alarm V.2.0"	1:49

== Personnel ==
Credits are adapted from the album's liner notes.

A Day to Remember

- Bobby Scruggs – drums
- Jeremy McKinnon – vocals
- Joshua Woodard – bass
- Neil Westfall – rhythm guitar
- Tom Denney – lead guitar

Production

- Andrew Wade – engineer, producer, mixing, and mastering
- Caleb for Bootcore Granfix – layout and design

Old Record production

- Andrew Wade – engineer, producer, mixing, and mastering
- Mike C. Hardcore – illustration
- Marianne Harris – photograph
- Doublej – CD layout

== Chart performance ==
Chart (2008)	Peak Position
U.S. Heatseekers Album Chart	16
