= A Day to Remember =

American rock band

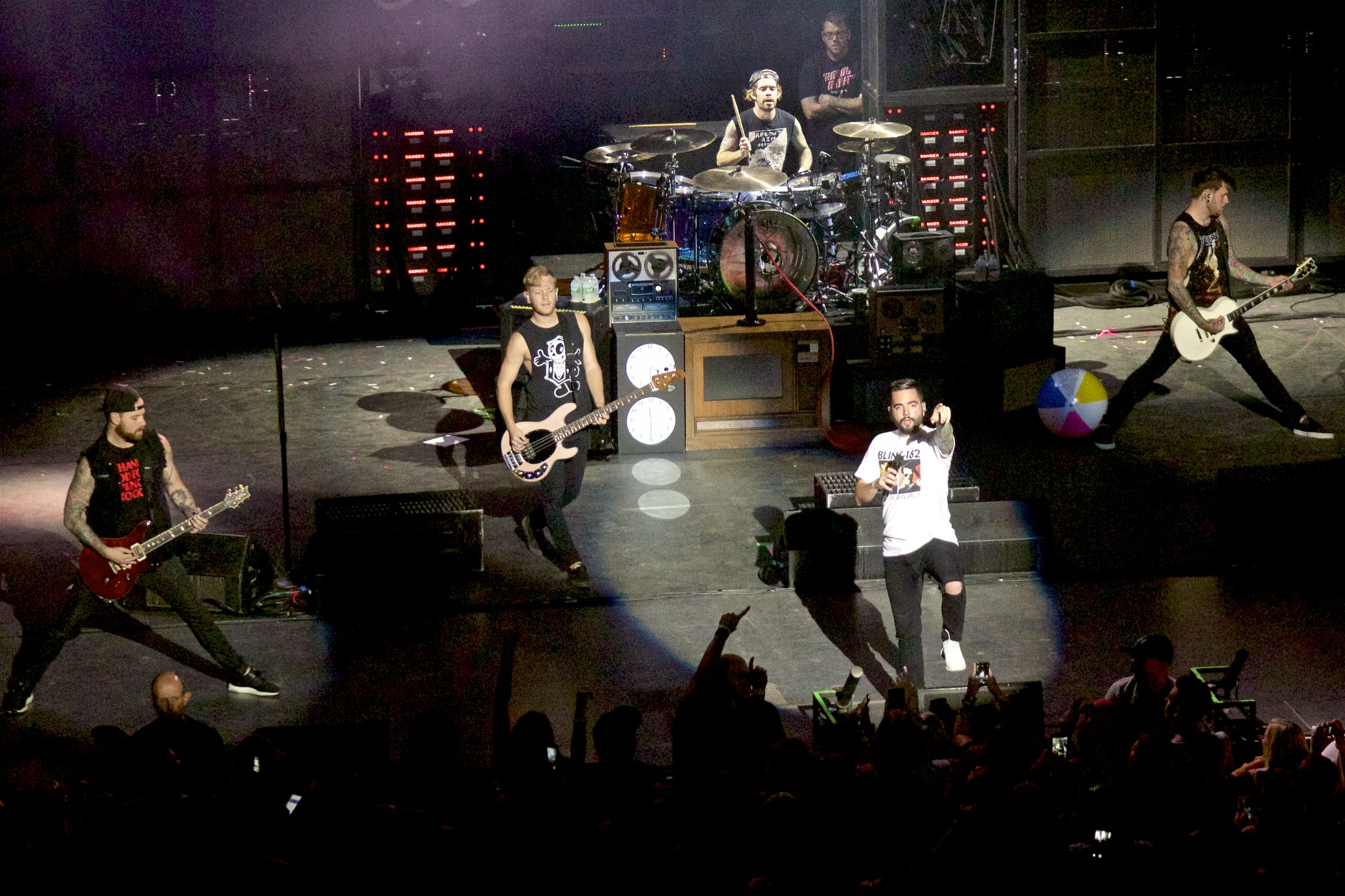
- A Day to Remember performing at Saratoga Performing Arts Center in 2016. From left to right: Kevin Skaff, Joshua Woodard, Alex Shelnutt, Jeremy McKinnon, and Neil Westfall.

Background information
- Origin: Ocala, Florida, U.S.
- Genres: Pop-punk; metalcore; post-hardcore; alternative rock
- Works: A Day to Remember discography
- Years active: 2003–present
- Labels: Indianola; Victory; ADTR; Epitaph; Fueled by Ramen
- Members: Jeremy McKinnon; Neil Westfall; Alex Shelnutt; Kevin Skaff
- Past members: Bobby Scruggs; Tom Denney; Joshua Woodard
- Website: adtr.com

A Day to Remember is an American rock band formed in Ocala, Florida, in 2003 by guitarist Tom Denney, vocalist Jeremy McKinnon, and drummer Bobby Scruggs. They are known for their amalgamation of metalcore and pop-punk. The band currently consists of McKinnon, rhythm guitarist Neil Westfall, drummer Alex Shelnutt and lead guitarist Kevin Skaff.

Signing with Indianola Records for their debut album, And Their Name Was Treason (2005), Scruggs was replaced by Shelnutt in 2006. Later that year the band recorded For Those Who Have Heart (2007) for Victory Records. They embarked on several tours of the UK and U.S. and played at several festivals before recording and releasing Homesick (2009). While promoting Homesick on tour, Denney was replaced by Skaff. Soon after releasing their next album, What Separates Me from You (2010), the band went on a worldwide tour to promote it. Since 2011, the band has been involved in a lawsuit with Victory Records over their recording contract. In October 2013 the band was given the right to self-release new albums until a final verdict is reached. They released their fifth album, Common Courtesy, that month. In 2016, the band released their sixth album, Bad Vibrations. They released their seventh album You're Welcome on March 5, 2021, which marked their first release under Fueled by Ramen. The band released their latest album Big Ole Album Vol. 1 on February 18, 2025.

== History ==
=== Early years and debut album (2003–2006) ===
After all playing in different groups in the Ocala music scene, singer Jeremy McKinnon, guitarists Neil Westfall and Tom Denney, bassist Joshua Woodard, and drummer Bobby Scruggs came together in 2003. Soon after, the band embarked onto playing only 7 shows in their first year of touring.

The band self-released an EP titled Halos for Heros, Dirt for the Dead in 2004, which was sold at their live shows. Their eponymous and second EP, moreso a demo rather, was released in January 2005; this was a precursor to their debut studio album and contained demo versions of six songs.

They were signed to Indianola in February 2005, for which they released their debut album, And Their Name Was Treason (2005) in May that year. It went on to sell over 10,000 copies.

Woodard said, "A friend of mine said he had the AIM screenname of someone at Victory Records. I didn't believe him, but I still started communicating with the guy. We IM'ed back and forth for about six months, and it happened that we were playing [...] in a town outside of Chicago. [...] It was our first time we ever played in Illinois, yet the 50–60 kids there were singing along to our tunes like they'd been fans all their lives."

=== Victory Records and For Those Who Have Heart (2006–2008) ===
Soon after signing with Victory, the band with their new drummer Alex Shelnutt went into Zing Studios to record their second album. The album, titled For Those Who Have Heart, was released in January 2007 on Victory and peaked at number 17 on Billboard's Top Heatseekers chart.

In September 2007, they posted a cover of Kelly Clarkson's "Since U Been Gone" on their MySpace page. This was later featured on the rerelease of For Those Who Have Heart, released in February 2008, and charted at number 43 on the Top Independent Albums chart.

A Day to Remember toured the UK for the first time in January 2008. They were nominated for Best International Newcomer at the 2008 Kerrang! Awards but lost to Black Tide.

Afterwards, the band had a lengthy tour opening for Silverstein along with The Devil Wears Prada and Protest the Hero. They then played The Bamboozle Left on April 6 at the Verizon Amphitheater in Irvine, California, one day at the 2008 Bamboozle Festival in East Rutherford, New Jersey on May 3, as well as the Download Festival in June, and the 2008 Vans Warped Tour. Before playing the Download Festival, they toured the UK with The Devil Wears Prada and Alesana on the Road To Download Tour. In mid-2008, the band played all the U.S. dates of the "Easycore Tour" along with New Found Glory, Four Year Strong, Crime in Stereo and International Superheroes of Hardcore.

=== Homesick and Denney's departure (2008–2010) ===
A remastered version of their first album, And Their Name Was Treason, titled Old Record, was released in October 2008 through Victory. Later that month, the band recorded their third studio album, Homesick.

In December 2008, A Day to Remember toured across Australia with Parkway Drive, Suicide Silence, The Acacia Strain and Confession.

Homesick was released in February 2009 and placed at number 21 on Billboard's Top 200 Listings and at number 1 on Top Independent Albums. It was featured in Rolling Stone's "Top 40 Albums" that month, hitting number 21. As of July 2010, the album had sold over 200,000 copies.

Following a UK tour, A Day to Remember went on a European tour in February 2009, with the German leg of the tour supported by For The Fallen Dreams and Kenai. A Day to Remember toured the U.S. from March to May 2009 with The Devil Wears Prada, Sky Eats Airplane and Emarosa. Prior to the tour, Tom Denney had broken his wrist; filling in for him was Kevin Skaff formerly of Four Letter Lie. They toured the UK with For the Fallen Dreams and Azriel. They also toured as part of the Warped Tour 2009, played at the Download Festival 2009 and toured Asia, Australia and New Zealand in August and September.

The band contributed a track to Punk Goes Pop 2 record from Fearless, covering The Fray's "Over My Head (Cable Car)".

On June 2, the band announced that Tom Denney had left the band because he wanted to focus on his marriage, family, and recording studio. He would remain a part of the band's process of writing new material. Skaff became a permanent replacement for Denney.

"The Downfall of Us All" was released as downloadable content for the Rock Band series of video games, and "NJ Legion Iced Tea" was released as a download for Guitar Hero World Tour.

A Day to Remember were set to play Reading & Leeds Festival in 2009 but pulled out due to Neil Westfall needing surgery.

They did their first headlining tour, The Pulling Your Pud Tour, along with Parkway Drive, In Fear and Faith, and I See Stars, starting in September 2009. The band then supported Bring Me the Horizon, with guest August Burns Red, on their tour of the UK and Europe in October.

On December 16, the band released the holiday-oriented single "Right Where You Want Me to Be". A music video was also made for the song.

=== What Separates Me from You and lawsuit with Victory (2010–2012) ===
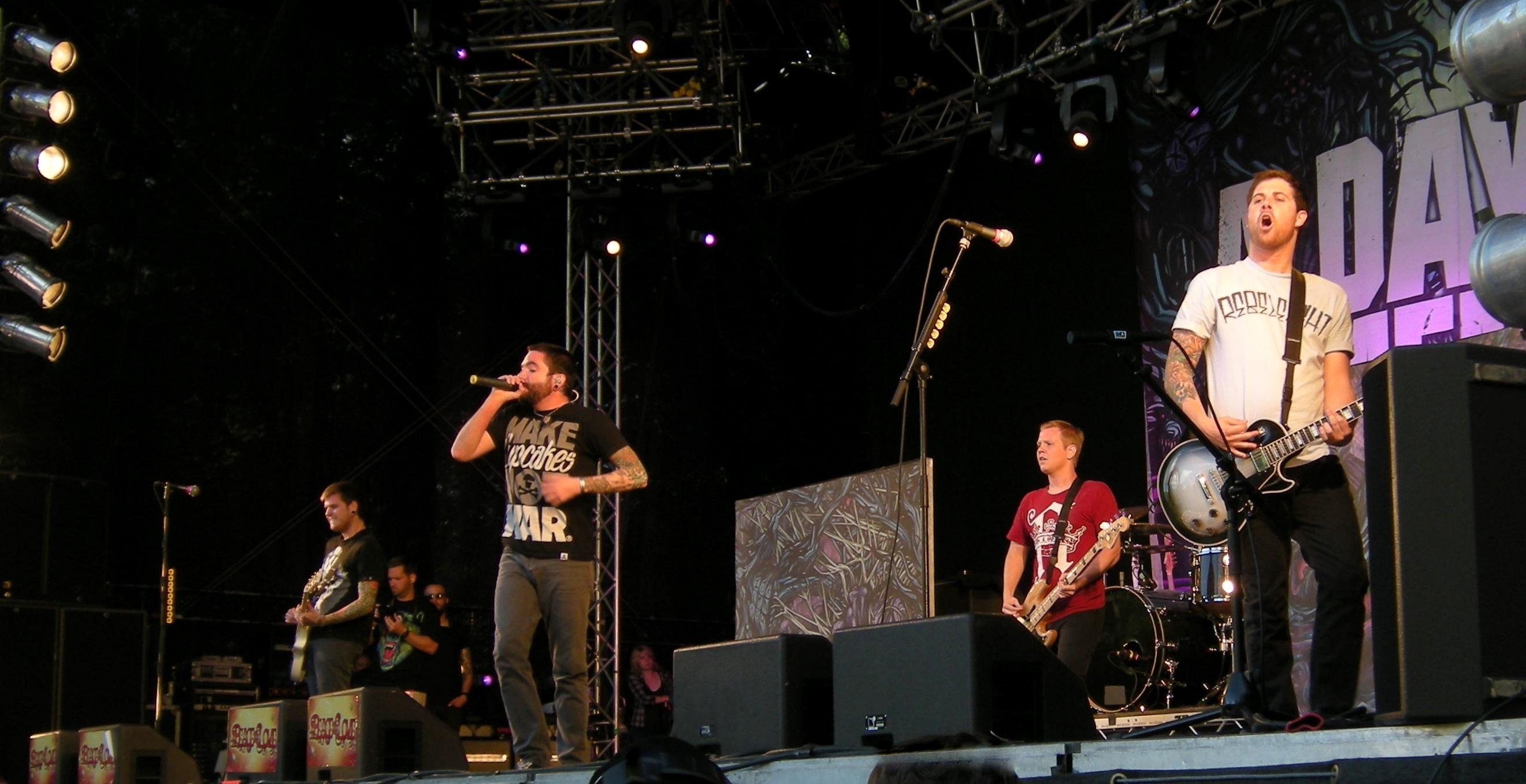
A Day to Remember performing at Peace & Love 2010 in Borlänge, Sweden

A Day to Remember performed at the 2010 Soundwave Australian music festival. They toured across the UK in March 2010 with support from Architects and Your Demise, followed by "Toursick" in North America with August Burns Red, Silverstein, Enter Shikari, Veara, and Go Radio from March 31 to May 18.

On July 14, MTV.com posted the music video for the band's latest single from Homesick, "Have Faith in Me", on their website.

According to Victory, it was claimed that the band was set to release their fourth studio album titled What Separates Me from You on October 26. The album was recorded in Ocala, Florida, with producer Chad Gilbert, who also produced Homesick, with the tracking finished in July. On September 20, A Day to Remember announced in a live video through Victory's website the name of their new album: What Separates Me from You. They then revealed the cover art for the album. The album's release was delayed a few weeks, until November 16.

In November, it was announced that A Day to Remember would play the 2011 edition of the Vans Warped Tour.

On January 6, 2011, the band showcased the official music video for the first single taken from the album, "All I Want", through an MTV premiere. The video features musicians from groups including A Day to Remember's former lead guitarist Tom Denney, as well as Vic Fuentes, Pete Wentz, Dallas Taylor, and Tim Lambesis.

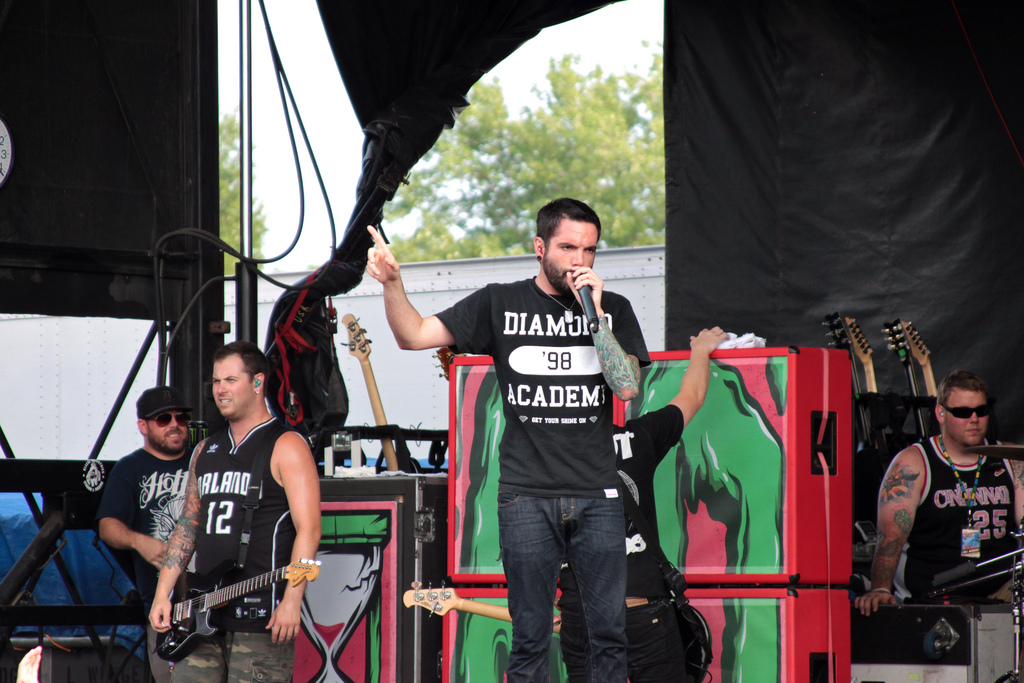
A Day to Remember live in 2011

On January 11, the band made their national TV debut, performing the songs "All I Want" and "Better Off This Way" on Jimmy Kimmel Live!.

Prior to Vans Warped Tour 2011, A Day to Remember headlined "The Game Changers Tour" (March and April) with support from Bring Me the Horizon, Pierce the Veil, and We Came as Romans.

On June 7, the band released the music video for the second single from the album, "All Signs Point to Lauderdale".

On December 15, it was announced that A Day to Remember planned to file suit against their label, Victory, due to breach of contract. Legal action had reportedly been initiated on May 31 of that year, with the band claiming Victory owed them over $75,000 in royalties. Victory has said that the lawsuit is actually about the band's refusal to fulfill their five-album contractual commitment, and their desire to move to a major label. A Day to Remember gave Altpress.com this statement: "A Day to Remember would like to make it clear that they did not announce nor seek any attention regarding their ongoing suit with Victory Records. This information has been public record since May of 2011 and they have no intention of speaking publicly or disparagingly regarding their disagreement with Victory. A Day to Remember will continue to release music for their fans and are looking forward to touring in 2012."

Beginning in January 2012, the band went on tour supporting Rise Against throughout the U.S., with the tour spreading over two legs and the band performing in Australia and New Zealand between two tour parts.

On February 27, the band released "2nd Sucks" as the fourth single from What Separates Me from You.

=== Common Courtesy (2012–2014) ===
In January 2012, Kevin Skaff said A Day To Remember would be recording after they had finished touring in early May, with hopes that the new album would be completed by August and released later that year; toward the end of that tour, they revealed the album would be titled Common Courtesy. During the turmoil with Victory, the band members recorded at McKinnon's home studio and self-financed the recording. On December 3, the band released a countdown on their website, counting down to December 21. When the countdown reached zero, a song titled "Violence (Enough Is Enough)" was released. Despite Gilbert stating in mid-October that the album might be finished within a week, the process was still only partially completed when "Violence (Enough Is Enough)" was released in December.

Work on the album was still in progress when McKinnon updated fans in February 2013; rather than the band's lawsuit against Victory Records, he attributed the delays to the large amount of material the band had created for the album and the difficulty of pooling what would be featured on the album. According to one interview, the group had recorded "three or four albums' worth" of material. In addition to songwriting, Denney returned to the band as a session musician for the album, though he was not credited as a performer in the album's credits. The group finished recording the project in March and began mixing, at which point the band began a headlining tour across North America from late March to early May. Titled the Right Back at It Again Tour, the band were joined by support acts Of Mice & Men, Chunk! No, Captain Chunk! and Issues. An Australian leg for July was later added to the tour alongside The Devil Wears Prada and Dream On, Dreamer, and the band played at Rock am Ring that June. The mixing process, in the meantime, took at least four months, but the final step of mastering was finished in September.

The band played another North American tour, titled the House Party tour, through from September to late October 2013. The support acts were originally announced as Pierce the Veil and All Time Low, with The Wonder Years joining the fold a few weeks after. On October 4, it was announced the band had won the lawsuit against Victory, allowing them to self-release Common Courtesy via digital platforms on October 8, 2013. A physical edition with additional tracks was released on November 25. "Right Back at It Again" was issued to radio stations as the album's lead single on November 11.

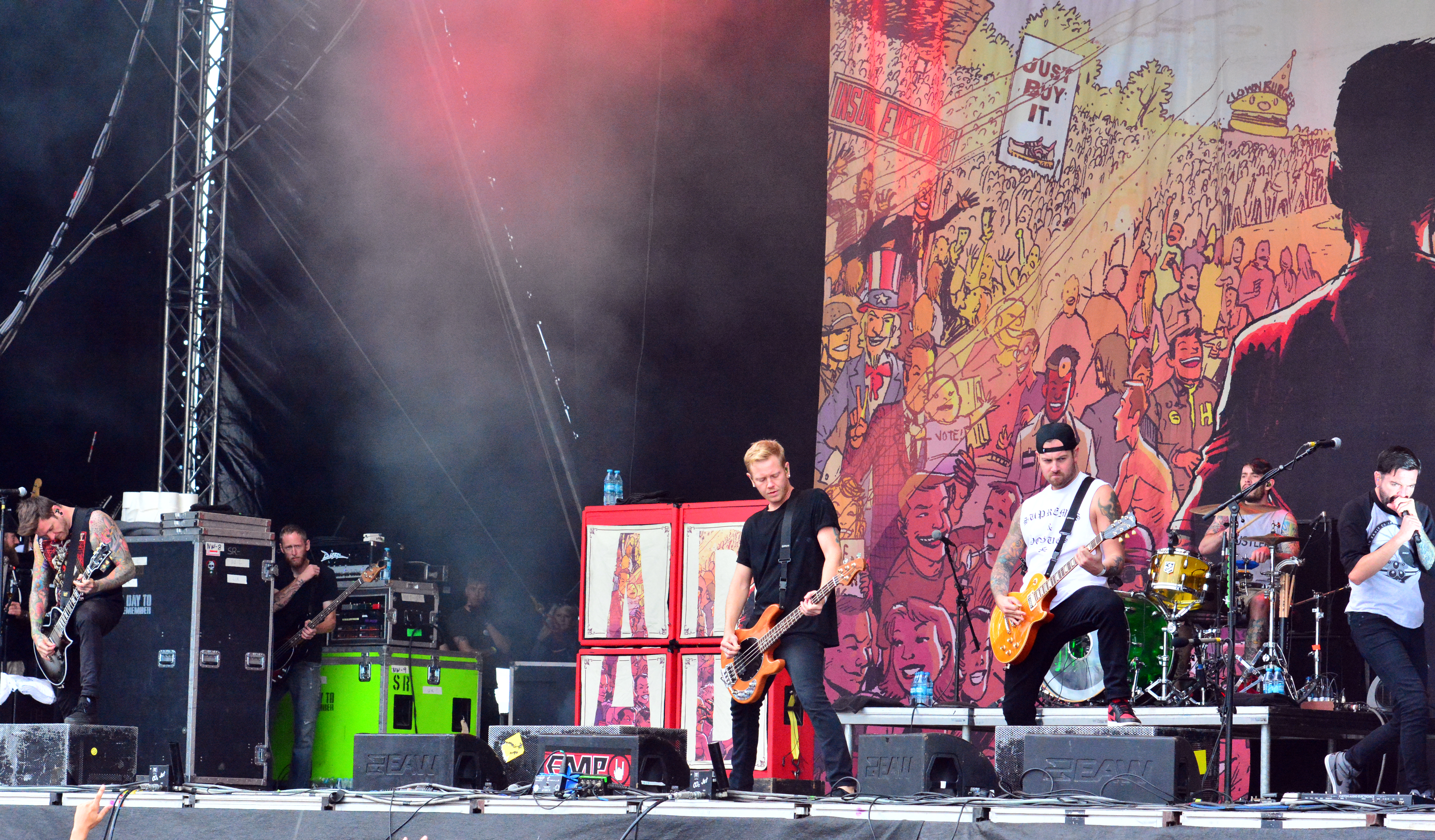
A Day to Remember on tour in 2014

The band also toured Europe in January and February 2014, and a single release for "End of Me" followed in March. The band toured across America throughout September and October with support acts including Bring Me the Horizon, Motionless in White and Chiodos, dubbing the venture the Parks & Devastation Tour; ahead of this tour was a stop at Michigan's Chill on the Hill festival. In March 2015, the band opened for Blink-182 on two dates.

=== Bad Vibrations (2015–2018) ===
On September 30, 2015, rhythm guitarist Neil Westfall announced in an interview with Ultimate Guitar that A Day to Remember were casually working on new material, without a prospective release date. The band went on to join the Amity Affliction's Big Ass Tour, a headlining tour of Australia scheduled for that December. Motionless in White accompanied the two as an additional support act. The Ghost Inside was to originally join the three groups as a fourth act, but was involved in a bus crash while touring the U.S. in November, and serious injuries to the members forced the group to cancel. Hands Like Houses were enlisted on short notice to replace the injured band. On March 9, 2016, "Paranoia" was premiered through Beats 1. The song was recorded with Bill Stevenson of Descendents/All. It was released as a single on 11 March. A music video was released on the same day, directed by Ethan Lader.

On June 2, 2016, a song titled "Bad Vibrations" was released, alongside a music video. It was also announced that the song would be the title track of their sixth album, Bad Vibrations. The album was released on their independent label and Epitaph Records. "Bullfight" was released as a single on July 25. "Naivety" was released as a single on August 19. "We Got This" was released as a single on September 1. The album was released on September 2. The band went on to support Blink-182 on the 2016 'California' Tour from July to October 2016. During their homecoming show in Ocala on March 18, 2017, the band were presented with keys to the city. The song "Same About You" was released to rock radio stations on January 23, 2018.

=== Departure of Josh Woodard and You're Welcome (2019–2021) ===
After several delays, A Day to Remember released their seventh full-length album, You're Welcome, on March 5, 2021, through Fueled by Ramen. The album spawned the singles "Degenerates", "Resentment", "Mindreader", "Brick Wall", "Everything We Need" and "Re-Entry".

On June 14, 2019, EDM producer Marshmello released a collaboration track with the band titled "Rescue Me", marking A Day to Remember's first new release in three years.

On January 25, 2021, the band held an acoustic livestream event called "Live at The Audio Compound".

On August 2, the band announced on their social media their headlining "The Re-Entry Tour" with Asking Alexandria and Point North as supporting acts. On October 13, it was announced that founding bassist Joshua Woodard had left the band due to the addressed allegations of past sexual misconduct from 2020. Woodard was also involved in a 2017 car crash where he "unexpectedly crossed over three lanes of traffic" and killed a 24-year old driver. This did not surface until 2021. On December 16, the band released a music video for the song "Last Chance to Dance (Bad Friend)".

=== Big Ole Album Vol. 1 (2022–present) ===
On July 21, 2022, the band released a single called "Miracle". The band toured with Bring Me the Horizon, Poorstacy and Static Dress in early 2023. On May 31, 2024, the band released a single called "Feedback". On February 18, 2025, the band surprise-released their eighth studio album, Big Ole Album Vol. 1, which features "Miracle" and "Feedback". On the same day, the band released two singles, "Make It Make Sense" and "LeBron". The album was released as a physical only first and eventually released to streaming services on March 21.

On March 13, 2026, the band were featured on the single "Always Let You Down", by Bilmuri, from his album Kinda Hard. The band are confirmed to be appearing at Welcome to Rockville taking place in Daytona Beach, Florida, in May 2026.

== Musical style and influences ==
A Day to Remember have been described by critics as pop-punk, metalcore, post-hardcore, alternative rock, melodic metalcore, emo, melodic hardcore, pop rock, and easycore. Their song structures often follow a metalcore formula and blend into a more pop-punk style chorus. AllMusic critic Eduardo Rivadavia has called this blend "pop-mosh", and also described the band as fusing "emo, hardcore, and metal." Kerrang! stated that pop-punk and metalcore had been "long considered oil and water" prior to the band's popularization of the fusion style. Vocalist Jeremy McKinnon told Music Connection in 2012: "We played pop-punk and threw breakdowns in the middle of these songs so people in Ocala would take us seriously. That's where we came from––it didn't make sense." When asked in an interview with AbsolutePunk about their sound, McKinnon also stated:

It's weird. See, it's funny because we have been doing this for so long. When we started, this shit was not cool. Everyone told us mixing the two genres wouldn't work. Hell, a lot of people still feel that way. We've just always played what we wanted to hear, and to be honest people weren't doing it back then. We loved pop-punk, we loved hardcore bands, and we couldn't decide what to be. So we said fuck it. Let's do them both.

Members of A Day to Remember have cited New Found Glory, Blink-182, NOFX, Bury Your Dead, Comeback Kid, Millencolin, On Broken Wings, Rancid and Seventh Star as influences.

== Self Help Fest ==
The inaugural Self Help Fest was an idea that vocalist Jeremy McKinnon came up with while talking with his girlfriend. "She told me that most people who come [to our shows] respond like it's more than just a concert to them... It's like the music is genuinely helping them. Thus we titled our festival Self Help, because at the end of the day, that's what music's all about." The first Self Help Fest took place on March 22, 2014, at the NOS Event Center in San Bernardino, California. A Day to Remember headlined the festival, and a number of punk rock and metalcore bands also performed, including Bring Me the Horizon, Of Mice and Men, The Story So Far, Memphis May Fire, Attila, and Letlive.

On October 4, 2014, in Philadelphia, Pennsylvania, only six months after the first festival, the line-up for the second festival was announced, with A Day to Remember, Bring Me the Horizon and the Story So Far returning. Other bands such as The Wonder Years, Motionless in White, Chiodos, and Gnarwolves made an appearance at the festival.

A Day to Remember's third Self Help Fest took place in San Bernardino on March 7, 2015. A Day to Remember did not perform, but they did produce the festival along with Fly South Music Group and a few other agencies.

A Day to Remember did perform at the fourth festival, held on March 19, 2016, at the NOS Events Center in San Bernardino.

In 2017, for the first time in the festival's history, four shows will be played: Philadelphia, Pennsylvania on September 10, 2017, Orlando, Florida on September 30, Detroit, Michigan on October 7, and San Bernardino on March 3, 2018.

== Band members ==
A Day to Remember live at Elbriot 2014

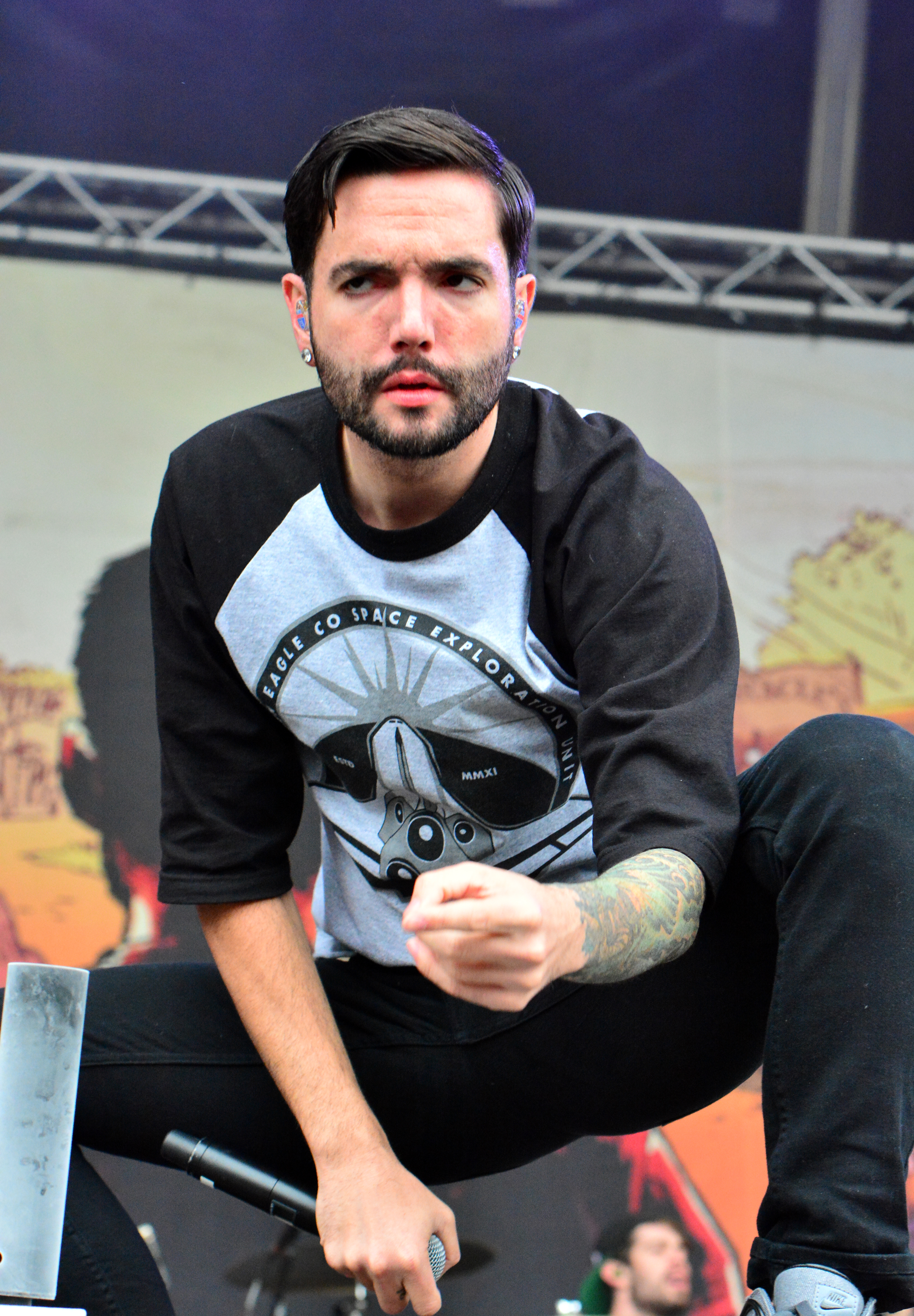
Jeremy McKinnon

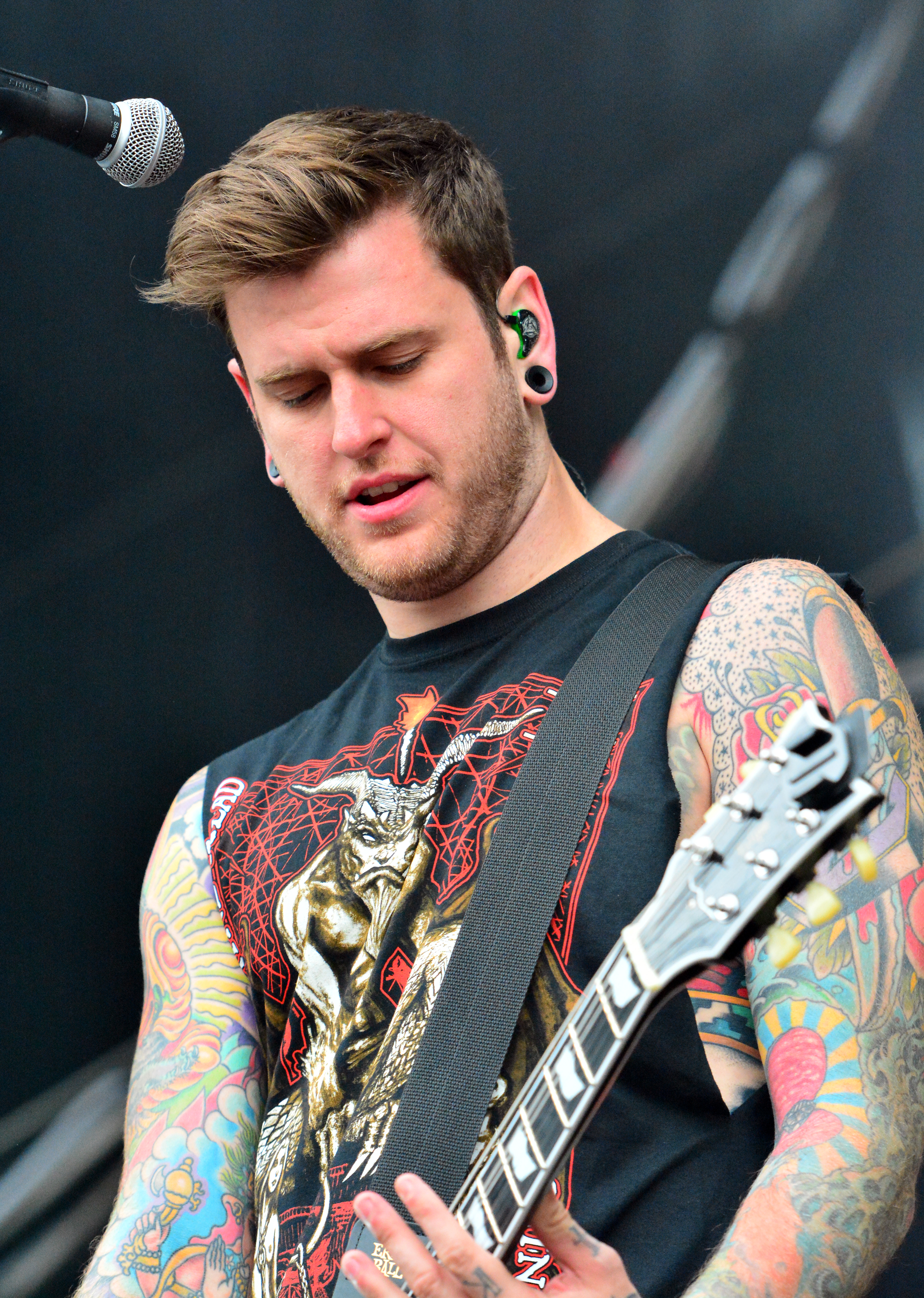
Neil Westfall

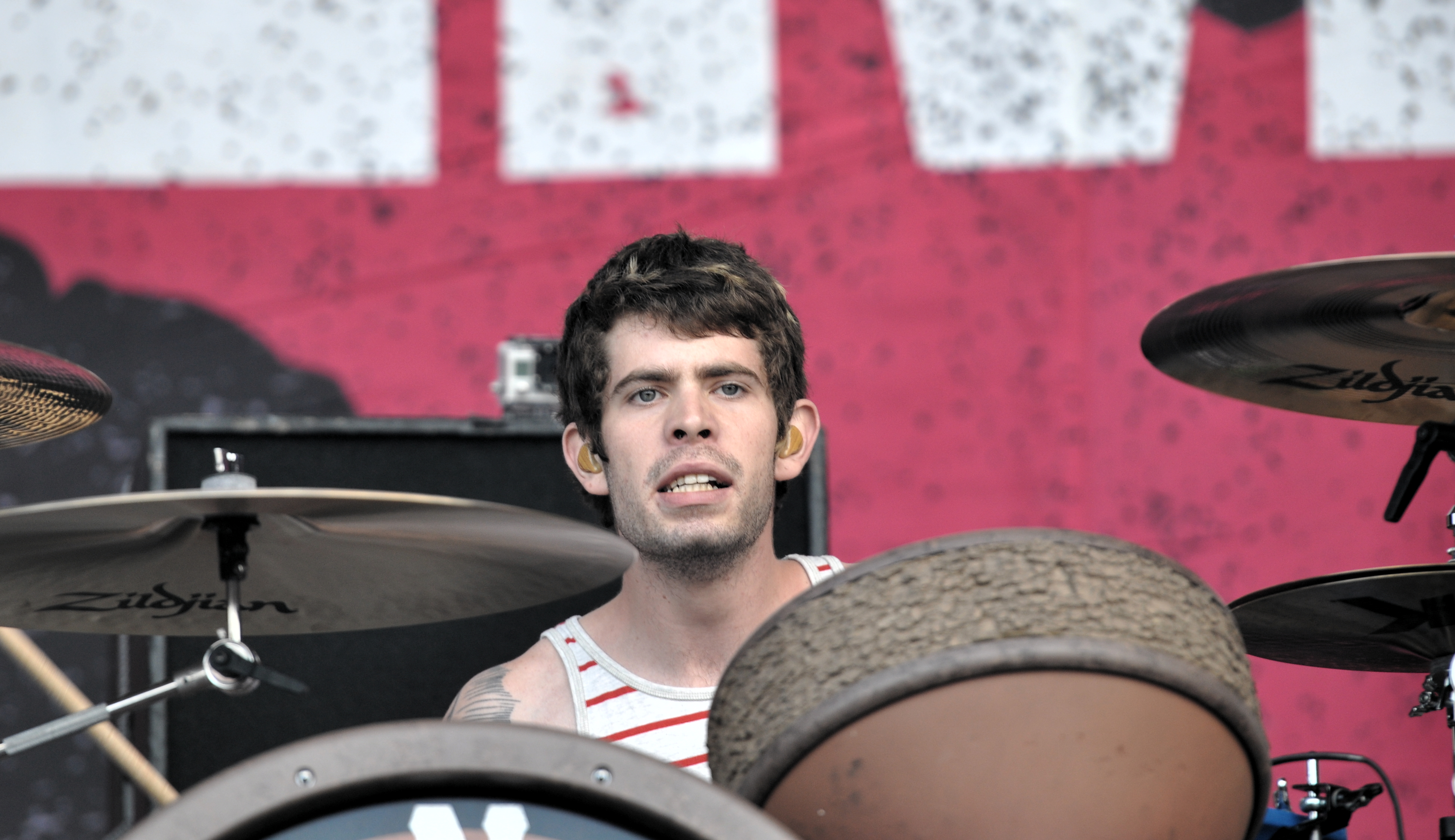
Alex Shelnutt

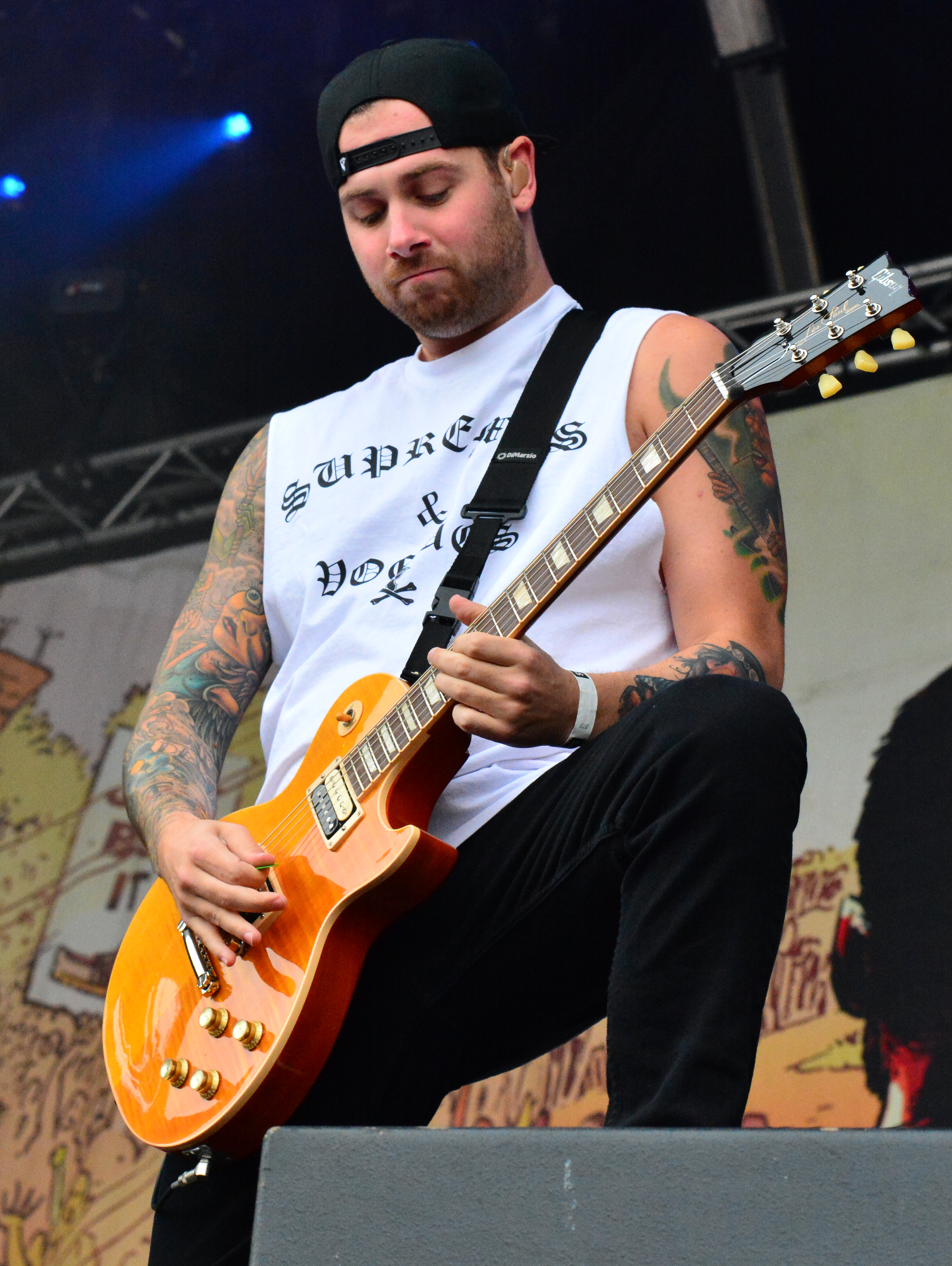
Kevin Skaff

Current

- Jeremy McKinnon – lead vocals (2003–present)
- Neil Westfall – rhythm guitar, backing vocals (2003–present)
- Alex Shelnutt – drums (2006–present)
- Kevin Skaff – lead guitar, backing vocals (2009–present)

Touring

- Dane Poppin – bass (2022–2023)
- Rob Vincent – keyboard (2022–2023)
- Matt Cleveland – additional guitars (2022–2023)
- Bobby Lynge – bass (2024–present)

Former

- Bobby Scruggs – drums (2003–2006)
- Tom Denney – lead guitar (2003–2009; session musician 2013)
- Joshua Woodard – bass (2003–2021)

Timeline

== Discography ==
Studio albums

- And Their Name Was Treason (2005)
- For Those Who Have Heart (2007)
- Homesick (2009)
- What Separates Me from You (2010)
- Common Courtesy (2013)
- Bad Vibrations (2016)
- You're Welcome (2021)
- Big Ole Album Vol. 1 (2025)

== Awards and nominations ==
Alternative Press Music Awards

Year	Nominee / work	Award	Result
2014	A Day to Remember	Artist of the Year	Nominated
2014	Common Courtesy	Album of the Year	Nominated
2014	A Day to Remember	Best Live Band	Nominated
2015	A Day to Remember	Best Live Band	Won
2015	"End of Me"	Best Music Video	Nominated

Kerrang! Music Awards

Year	Nominee / work	Award	Result
2012	A Day to Remember	Best International Band	Nominated
