= Tom Denney =

American musician

- Born: November 23, 1982 (age 43); Ocala, Florida, U.S.
- Genres: Metalcore; pop-punk; post-hardcore; rap rock
- Occupations: Guitarist; songwriter; record producer; musician
- Instrument: Guitar
- Years active: 2003–present
- Labels: Indianola; Victory; 33
- Formerly of: A Day to Remember

Tom Denney (born November 23, 1982) is an American musician and record producer. He is a founding member and the ex-lead guitarist of A Day to Remember. He parted ways with the band in 2009, and now produces at his own recording studio (though he was involved with the band's writing sessions for three more of their albums and was a session musician on Common Courtesy).

He continues to write and produce music for various other bands, with Secrets being one of his main projects.

Tom’s current band is Sounds Like Color, with Jesse Smarslok on vocals.

== History ==
=== Early years and A Day to Remember (1992–2009) ===
Tom Denney started playing guitar from the age of 10. Denney was later in a band called 2 Days 2 Late with drummer Bobby Scruggs; Scruggs would later become a member of Paddock Park. Denney called vocalist Jeremy McKinnon (who was in another band at the time) asking if he wanted to form another band, later called A Day to Remember. Denney performed on the band's first three albums: And Their Name Was Treason (2005), For Those Who Have Heart (2007), and Homesick (2009). Denney has stated that Nirvana was a major influence on him, adding that "if it wasn't for Nirvana, I honestly wouldn't be here". Other inspirations include country music artists such as George Jones and Johnny Cash.

On June 2, 2009, the band announced that Denney had left the group; and was replaced by Four Letter Lie guitarist Kevin Skaff. The band stated that Denney left because he wants to focus on his marriage, a family, and his recording studio. Regardless of his departure from the band, he still remained a part of the writing process of new material. Denney has since contributed music to a number of the band's albums: What Separates Me from You (2010), Common Courtesy (2013), and Bad Vibrations (2016). He also contributed as a session musician to Common Courtesy, but was not credited as a performer.

=== Record producer and solo career (2007–present) ===
Brian Calzini, a friend of Denney's, stopped by Denney's Titan Studio, while he was working on a song. Calzini asked whether he could overdub vocals to it: "we stayed up all night fucking around on this song and I just randomly made up lyrics to it as I went. The song had a very nu-metal singing part so Tom sang on it to be funny. The song was a complete joke just for fun". Later that night after the session had finished, Calzini took the track home with him, and put it on MySpace, titling it "I'll Swing My Fists". After changing the name of his MySpace account, due to the growing number of plays of the song, to Boston B; the pair soon recorded several tracks that Denney had left unused to which Calzini added lyrics to. Calzini gathered a group of people to pose as a band, and to record music with, at Denney's studio; naming the group as Paddock Park and releasing the songs on With False Hope EP (2007). All the songs featured on the EP were later re-recorded in August 2008, with Denney producing, with some new songs to make it a full-length album.

On July 26, 2011, it was announced that Denney would be releasing a solo EP in the fall of that year on his own record label, 33 Records. A short preview of one song, rap song "I'm Gangsta", was released on the same day. The song was later released as a single on October 25; the music video of which had its premiere via Alternative Press' APTV, on November 1. Mest released a single on June 4, 2013, "Radio (Something to Believe)", which was co-written with Denney and features McKinnon as a guest musician. It was also produced by Denney.

== Discography ==
=== Solo ===
- Ima Monster (EP, 2011)

=== With A Day to Remember ===
As composer and band member

- And Their Name Was Treason (2005)
- For Those Who Have Heart (2007)
- Homesick (2009)

As composer only

- What Separates Me from You (2010)
- Bad Vibrations (2016)

As composer and session musician

- Common Courtesy (2013)

=== Production discography ===
Band	Album	Role	Release year
Paddock Park	A Hiding Place for Fake Friends	Producer	2008
Dang We're on Fire	Wake Up the Sleepers (EP)	Producer	2008
Dang We're on Fire	Heart Stopped Beating (EP)	Producer	2009
We Are Defiance	Let's Forget Regret (EP)	Producer	2009
Confide	Recover	Composer	2010
We Are the in Crowd	Guaranteed to Disagree (EP)	Composer	2010
Pierce the Veil	Selfish Machines	Composer	2010
Honor Bright	Action! Drama! Suspense!	Producer, engineer	2010
The Word Alive	Deceiver	Composer	2010
Close to Home	Never Back Down	Producer, engineer, composer, vocals	2011
We Are Defiance	Trust in Few	Producer, engineer, mixing, mastering, composer	2011
For the Fallen Dreams	Back Burner	Producer, engineer, mixing, composer	2011
Live the Story	Everything I Am (EP)	Producer	2011
Outline in Color		Producer	2011
For the Fallen Dreams	Wasted Youth	Producer, engineer, mixing	2012
Secrets	The Ascent	Producer, engineer, mixing, mastering, composer	2012
Speaking the King's	Here to Stay (EP)	Composer, producer, engineer	2013
Secrets	Fragile Figures	Producer, engineer, mixing	2013
The Rose Line	Consequences	Producer, engineer, mixing	2013
Woe, Is Me	American Dream (EP)	Producer	2013
Fathoms	Cold Youth (EP)	Producer	2013
A Sound in Sight	A Sound in Sight (EP)	Producer, mixing, mastering	2013
We Are Defiance	Live and Learn	Producer	TBA
Before Their Eyes	II	Producer	TBA
Akissforjersey	New Bodies	Mastering	2014
Dayseeker	What It Means to Be Defeated (Reissue)	Remixing, remastering	2014
Wage War	Blueprints	Composer	2015
Pierce the Veil	Misadventures	Composer	2016
Secrets	The Collapse	Producer, engineer, mixing, mastering, composer	2022
