= How We Survive =

How We Survive may refer to:

- "How We Survive", a 2013 song by Sean Kingston featuring Busta Rhymes from Back 2 Life
- "How We Survive", a 2013 song by Secrets from Fragile Figures
