= Daybreak (Woe, Is Me album) =

Studio album by Woe, Is Me
- Released: August 22, 2025
- Recorded: 2024–2025
- Genres: Metalcore; post-hardcore; hard rock; alternative metal
- Length: 31:30
- Label: SBG
- Producers: Corey Bautista; Scott Seigel

Woe, Is Me chronology
American Dream (2013)	Daybreak (2025)

Singles from Daybreak
- 1. "Here's to Me (A Story to Tell, Pt. 2)" Released: April 10, 2025; 2. "Devil in My Mind" Released: May 23, 2025; 3. "Odd Behavior" Released: June 20, 2025; 4. "The Closer" Released: July 25, 2025

Daybreak is the third album by metalcore band, Woe, Is Me. The album was released on August 22, 2025 through SBG Records. It is the band's first album to be released through the label, and the band's first album in 13 years since 2012's Genesi[s].

== Background ==
In November 2024, Woe, Is Me announced that they have signed to SBG Records and that they are working on a new album for 2025. In March 2025, the band parted ways with keyboardist Ben Ferris. The band would then part ways with bassist Cory Ferris a short while later.

The band would begin to tease more of the album by releasing the first single titled "Here's To Me (A Story To Tell, Pt. 2)" on April 10, 2025. The band would then release two more singles titled "Devil In My Mind" (released May 23, 2025) and "Odd Behaviour" (released June 20, 2025 and featuring guest vocals from AJ Rebollo) before revealing the album's details on July 25, 2025 along with the release of the final single titled "The Closer". The band released a music video for the track "Seminola Blvd" (featuring guest vocals from Ryan Chandler Love of Abandcalledlove.) on August 22, 2025, coinciding with the album's release.

== Track listing ==
No.	Title	Length
1.	"The Opener"	0:58
2.	"Here's to Me (A Story to Tell, Pt. 2)"	3:20
3.	"Seminola Blvd" (featuring Abandcalledlove.)	2:56
4.	"Borrowed Time"	3:16
5.	"Hell House"	2:42
6.	"FU2Then"	2:57
7.	"Bedtime Stories"	2:18
8.	"Devil in My Mind"	3:07
9.	"Odd Behavior" (featuring AJ Rebollo)	3:08
10.	"Sick Joke"	2:48
11.	"The Closer"	4:00
Total length:		31:30

== Personnel ==
Woe, Is Me

- Hance Alligood – clean vocals, unclean vocals (on “Hell House” and “Sick Joke”)
- Michael Bohn – unclean vocals, clean vocals (on Bedtime Stories)
- Ben Ferris – keyboards, unclean vocals
- Kevin Hanson – rhythm guitar
- Andrew Paiano – lead guitar
- Matthew Whyde – drums

Additional musicians

- Ryan Chandler Love (Abandcalledlove.) – additional vocals on "Seminola Blvd"
- AJ Rebollo (ex-Bad Wolves, ex-Issues) – additional vocals on "Odd Behavior"

Production

- Corey Bautista – production
- Scott Seigel – production
