= Everything That Got Us Here =

Studio album by Secrets
- Released: December 11, 2015
- Recorded: 2015
- Genres: Post-hardcore; melodic hardcore; emo; melodic metalcore
- Length: 37:32
- Labels: Velocity; Rise
- Producers: Andrew Wade; Tom Denney

Secrets chronology
Renditions (2015)	Everything That Got Us Here (2015)	Secrets (2018)

Singles from Everything That Got Us Here
- 1. "Left Behind" Released: October 14, 2015; 2. "Rise Up" Released: November 10, 2015

Everything That Got Us Here is the third studio album from American post hardcore band Secrets. It is the band's first release with unclean vocalist Wade Walters. The lead single, "Left Behind", was released on October 14, 2015.

== Background ==
The band announced they had begun work on their third album in January 2015. At the same time, the band finished working on their acoustic EP Renditions. The band revealed they had recorded the entire album with new vocalist Wade Walters the same day they announced Aaron Melzer's departure.

Professional ratings
Review scores
Source	Rating
Sputnikmusic	2.5/5 stars
It's All Dead	4/5 stars
Broken Arrow Magazine	6.5/10
Creation Press	8/10

== Track listing ==
No.	Title	Length
1.	"Intro"	0:33
2.	"Rise Up"	3:55
3.	"Left Behind"	3:17
4.	"Learn to Love"	3:05
5.	"Half Alive"	3:28
6.	"The Man That Never Was"	4:08
7.	"For What It's Worth"	3:10
8.	"I'll Be Fine"	3:40
9.	"Turn the Page"	3:47
10.	""In Loving Memory""	4:06
11.	"The One With No One"	4:23

== Personnel ==
Band

- Richard Rogers - lead vocals, rhythm guitar
- Wade Walters - bass guitar, unclean vocals
- Michael Sherman - lead guitar
- Joe English - drums

Production

- Andrew Wade - vocal producer
- Tom Denney - producer
- Stephen Marro - additional production

== Charts ==
Chart (2016)	Peak Position
U.S. Top Hard Rock Albums	11
U.S. Independent Albums	20
U.S. Top Rock Albums	36
