= Sincerity (disambiguation) =

Sincerity is the virtue of one who communicates and acts in accordance with their feelings, beliefs, thoughts and desires.

Sincerity may also refer to:

== Film ==
- Sincerity (1939 film), a 1939 Japanese film by Mikio Naruse
- Sincerity, a 1953 Japanese film by Masaki Kobayashi

== Music ==
- "Sincerity", a song from the album Party by Iggy Pop
- "Sincerity", a song from the album In Strict Tempo by David Ball
- "Sincerity", a song from the album Affection by Lisa Stansfield
- "Sincerity", a song from the album Trust in Few by We Are Defiance
