= Woe, Is Me =

American metalcore band

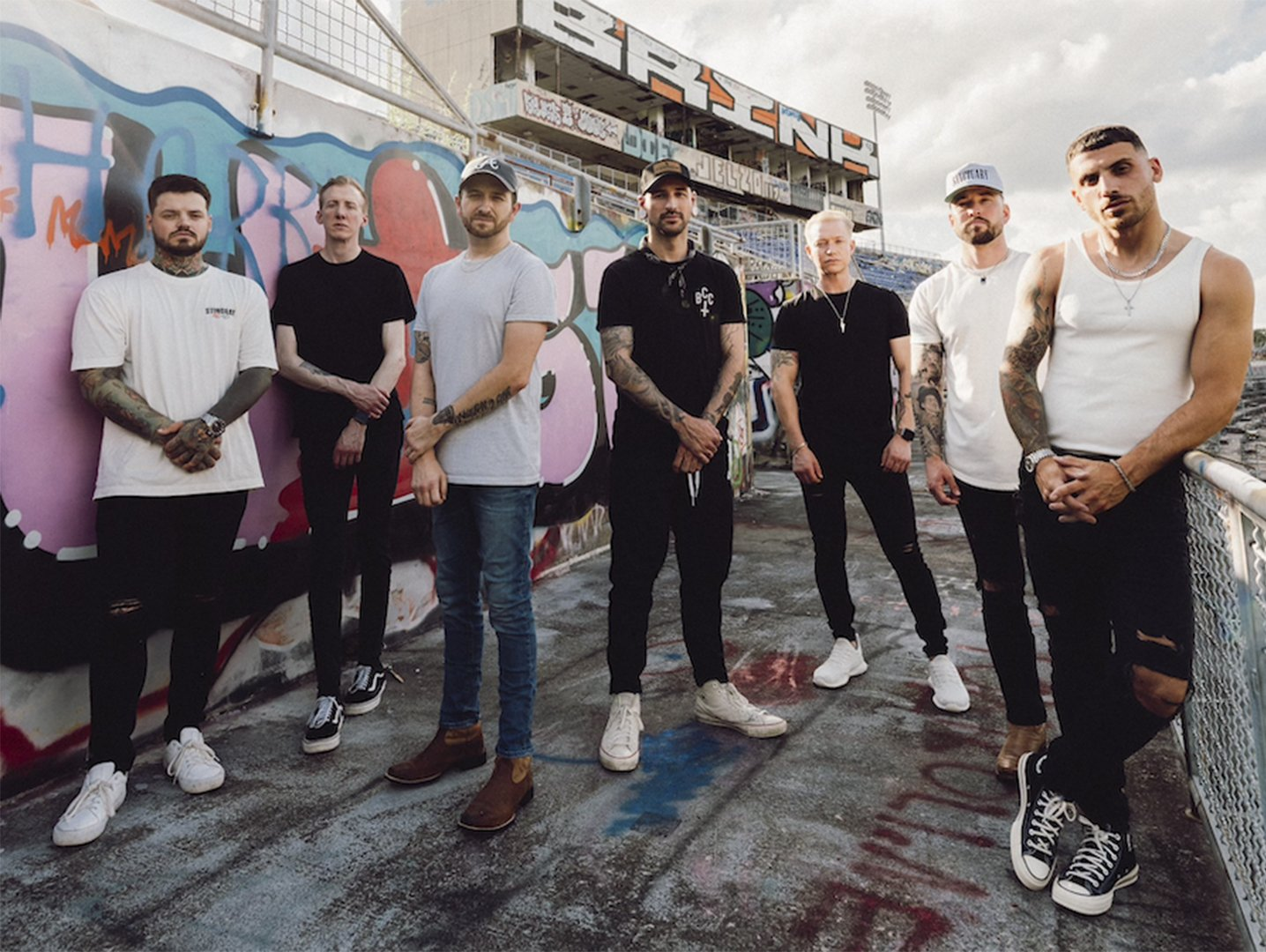
- Woe, Is Me - 2024

Background information
- Origin: Atlanta, Georgia, U.S.
- Genres: Metalcore; post-hardcore; electronicore
- Years active: 2009–2013; 2022–present
- Labels: SBG; Rise; Velocity
- Spinoffs: Issues
- Members: Hance Alligood; Kevin Hanson; Michael Bohn; Andrew Paiano; Matthew Whyde
- Past members: Tyler Carter; Doriano Magliano; Brian Medley; David Angle; Matt Mulkey; Geoffrey Higgins; Tim Sherrill; Jack Langdell; Austin Thornton; Ben Ferris; Cory Ferris
- Website: wimatl.com

Woe, Is Me is an American metalcore band from Atlanta formed in 2009. The band is signed to SBG Records. They were formerly signed to Rise Records and its subsidiary, Velocity Records. Their debut album, Numbers, was released on August 31, 2010, and charted at number 16 on Billboard's Top Heatseekers chart.

Due to ongoing disputes between members, the band underwent several lineup changes during its original four-year run, with guitarist Kevin Hanson being the only founding member who remained. Woe, Is Me disbanded in September 2013, but announced a reunion in July 2022 with the "Vengeance" lineup. They played their first show in over 9 years in Dallas, Texas on October 29, 2022.

== History ==
=== Formation and Numbers (2009–2010) ===
Woe, Is Me was founded during the fall of 2009 in Atlanta by former Of Machines drummer Austin Thornton, who started the band along with Kevin Hanson, Cory Ferris, and Ben Ferris, who were all formerly of a local Atlanta-based band named Cheyne Stokes. Tim Sherrill, who played lead guitar of another local group named Shooter McGavin, also joined in.

These five members then recruited Michael Bohn of A Path Less Traveled and Hance Alligood of Oh, Manhattan as the band's initial vocalists. Alligood stepped down shortly after and Matt Mulkey briefly took his place as the band's clean vocalist. Whilst in the band, Mulkey helped write lyrics and record vocals for their original three demos, "Hell, or High Water", "I" and "If Not, for Ourselves", with producer Cameron Mizell before leaving. Being in need of a clean singer, Rise Records phoned Tyler Carter, who was also a member of A Path Less Traveled along with Bohn, while he was working as a nurse to inquire if he was interested in joining the band, Carter accepted the offer and then became the band's clean vocalist.

With this seven-member line up, the band released these three demo tracks to their MySpace profile.

The group later recorded and released a cover of the Kesha song "Tik Tok", also showcased online within a few months of being a band. Soon after these recordings were released, The Artery Foundation took notice of them. Rise Records, along with their imprint label, Velocity Records, signed Woe, Is Me before even playing their first show. They recorded their debut album, Number[s] during the same month that they were signed. It was subsequently released on August 31, 2010. It reached position No. 16 on Billboard's Top Heatseekers chart. The band's debut tour, the Pyknic Partery tour, was shared with Drop Dead, Gorgeous, From First to Last, Sleeping with Sirens, Abandon All Ships, For All Those Sleeping, and Attila.

Clean vocalist Tyler Carter's soul-influenced voice garnered comparisons to Jonny Craig, who provides guest appearances on the album. The group held an album release show in Georgia for Number[s] on September 2, 2010, with pop punk band Veara as a supporting act. Later in September, the band recorded a cover of the Katy Perry song "Hot n Cold" for the compilation album, Punk Goes Pop 3.

In an interview with radio station The Gunz Show, Carter stated that the band would be recording a music video for "[&] Delinquents" in September 2010. The group embarked on a Canadian tour supporting Abandon All Ships during October. During November 2010, the band was included on a US tour entitled Average Guys with Exceptional Hair Tour in support of A Skylit Drive, along with For All Those Sleeping, Scarlett O'Hara, and Motionless in White. The music video for "[&] Delinquents" was released on the first of December of that year.

=== "Fame > Demise", lineup instability (2010–2011) ===
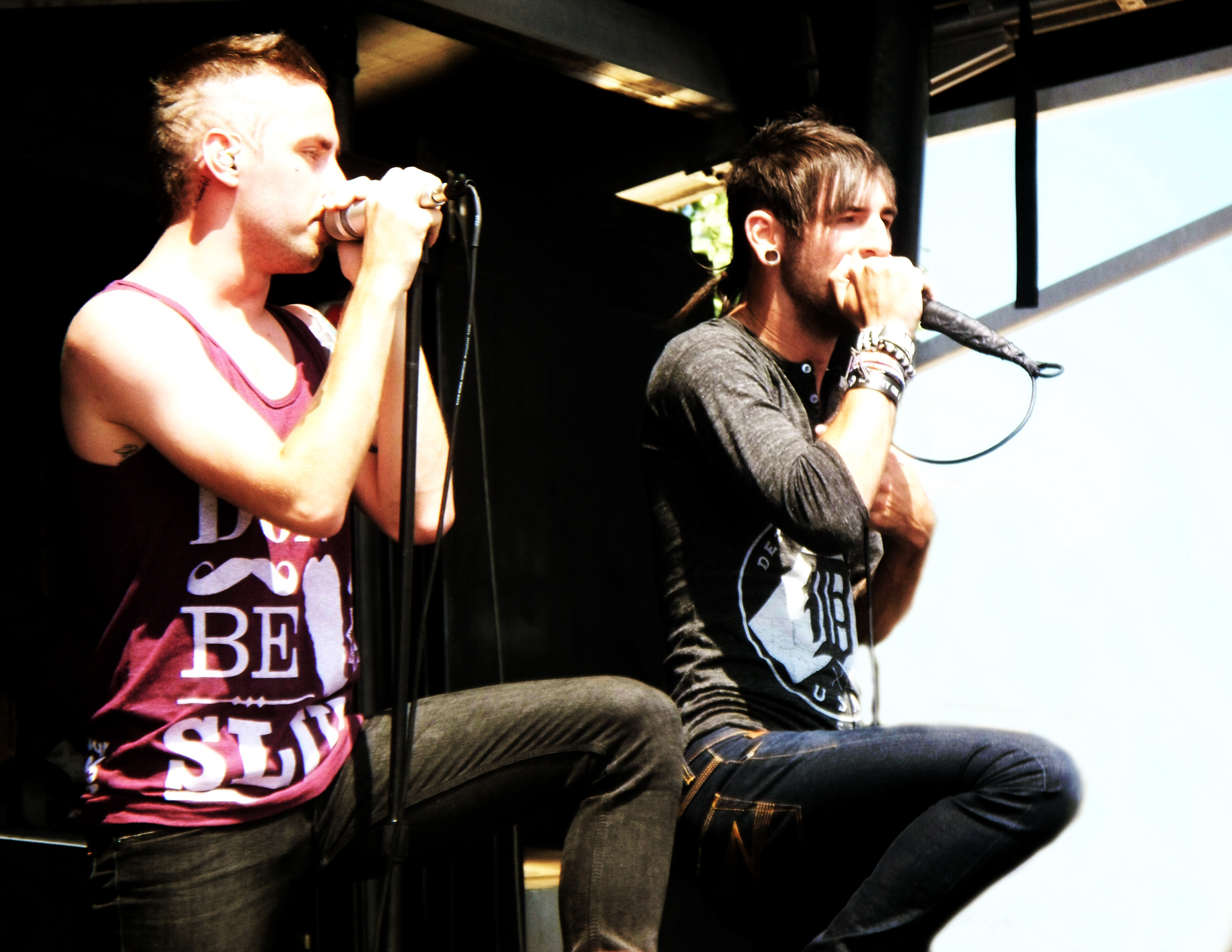
Vocalists Tyler Carter (left) and Michael Bohn in 2011.

By the end of 2010, lead guitarist Tim Sherrill parted ways with Woe, Is Me. Jack Langdell filled in until Geoffrey Higgins took up the position in March 2011. Soon after, the group officially released "Fame > Demise" (pronounced fame over demise) through the iTunes Store on March 21, 2011. Carter explained that the song is and would only remain as a single, and would not be part of the band's second album. An acoustic version of the song was also released.

In May 2011, new lead guitarist Geoffrey Higgins departed from the band. The group began their performances on Warped Tour with only Hanson performing the rhythm guitar parts to where leads were backtracked during performances for the time being due to their lack of a lead guitarist. With the band yet again searching for a lead guitar player, the conclusion of their search was made weeks afterward in Mid-July when Abandon All Ships' drummer and guitarist, Dan and Andrew Paiano, were kicked from the band. Almost immediately afterward, it was announced that Andrew would be joining Woe, Is Me to play lead guitar. On August 10, 2011, clean vocalist, Tyler Carter left the band. He cited an interest in following newer and different objectives than being in a band and went on to state that "[the rock 'n' roll lifestyle] and what it consists of just isn't for me anymore" as the reason for his departure.

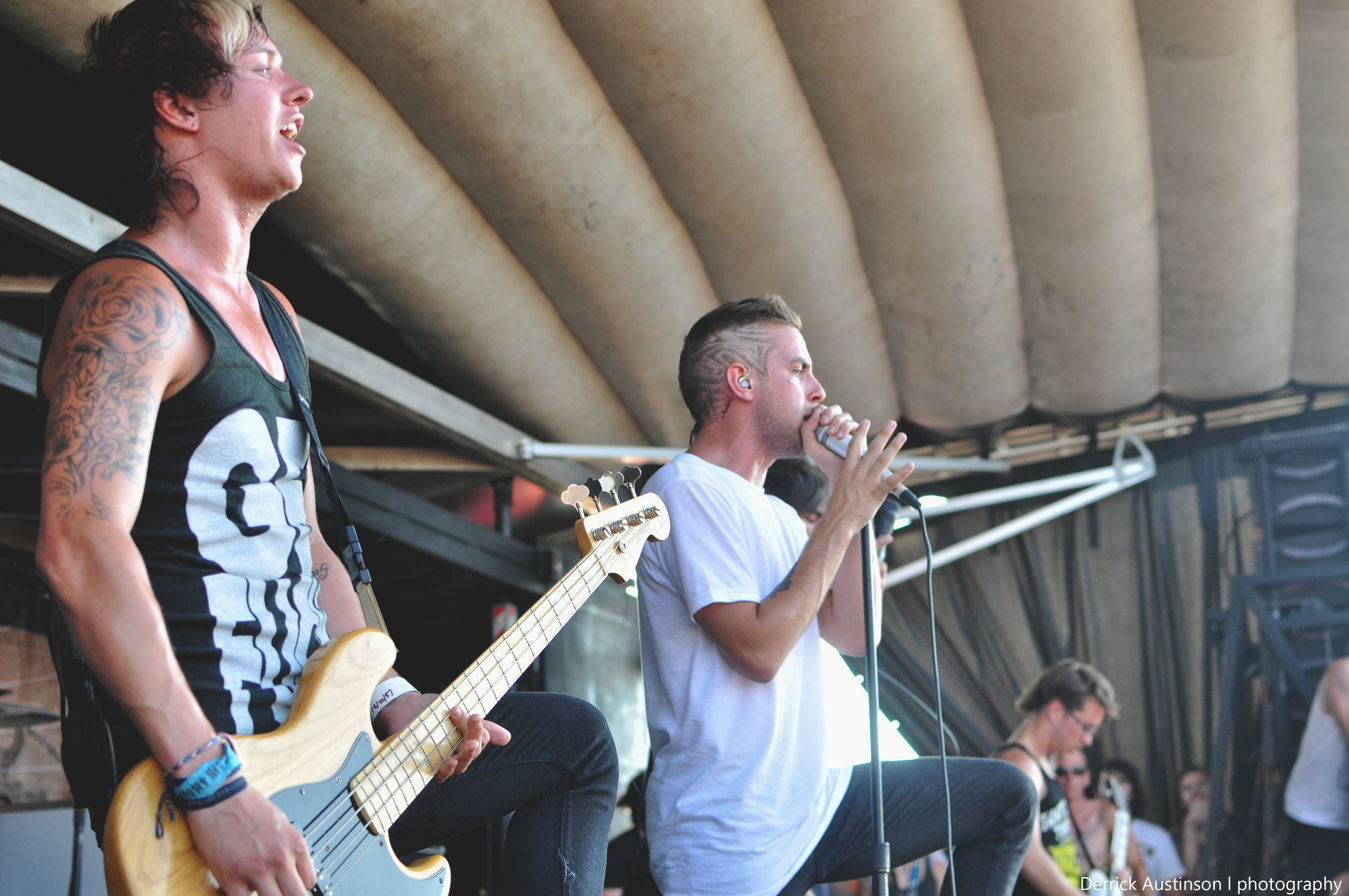
Woe, Is Me live in 2011

=== "Vengeance", Number[s] re-issue, and Genesi[s] (2011–2012) ===
On September 15, 2011, Woe, Is Me announced via-video update the return of the band's original clean vocalist, Hance Alligood. Along with this update, the group also played various clips from a new single entitled, "Vengeance", which was released on September 27. The band would also record another Katy Perry cover, for the song "Last Friday Night (T.G.I.F)" for the compilation album Punk Goes Pop 4, On March 7, 2012, Michael Bohn and both Ferris brothers left the band due to personal, professional, and musical differences.

On April 16, 2012, touring members Doriano Magliano (former vocalist for That's Outrageous!) and bassist Brian Medley officially announced they had joined Woe, Is Me. The band set to enter the studio throughout summer 2012 with a release set sometime later this year. On April 19, 2012, Woe, Is Me were announced as part of the "Scream It Like You Mean It 2012" tour (July–August 2012) alongside headliner Attack Attack! with We Came as Romans, The Acacia Strain, Oceano, Like Moths to Flames, Close to Home, Impending Doom, Abandon All Ships, Secrets, Volumes, For All Those Sleeping, The Chariot, Glass Cloud, At The Skylines, Texas in July, In Fear and Faith, and Hands Like Houses.

=== American Dream EP and breakup (2013) ===
On March 8, 2013, the band released a statement that they had parted ways with drummer and founding member Austin Thornton, due to personal differences. David Angle from At The Skylines was pulled in as his replacement. As of Thornton's departure, Kevin Hanson was the only original member in the band. With the release of the statement, the band also stated that they are planning on releasing a new single in June. On April 25, Woe, Is Me stated on their Facebook page that they will be tracking their new music with Tom Denney. They plan to release it during the summer. A recent interview with the band and lead singer Hance in particular gave insight towards the feel of the new album that they are working on. "The singing/screaming ratio is more balanced, whereas Genesis had a lot more screaming and heavy parts. Doriano and I will share vocal responsibilities and have equal singing/screaming parts. Genesis had lots of breakdowns/chug parts, which don’t get me wrong, were cool. But, the heavy parts on this new stuff will be more riffy and more fun to move to. The choruses will still have the same pop feel to them as the ones from Genesi[s]".

On June 15, 2013, during the first show of Warped Tour, Woe, Is Me announced they would be releasing a new EP later in the year. They later released a new song called "Stand Up," which was announced as the first single from the EP, titled American Dream. It is the first record to not have the Woe, Is Me symbol [s]. Before the new EP dropped, Andrew Paiano had an emergency forcing him to leave in late July and the group continued playing Warped Tour as a 5-piece.

While the band had a plan to record a third album, Alternative Press confirmed during September 2013 that the band had ended. Woe, Is Me included a personal post from vocalist Hance Alligood stating that he had "lost passion" for the genre and had decided to leave the band on good terms. As a result, the remaining members decided to disband instead of going through yet another lineup change.

=== Reunion (2022–2023) ===
On July 25, 2022, Woe, Is Me alluded to the fact that the band would be reforming with the lineup from their 2011 "Vengeance" single (Michael Bohn, Hance Alligood, Andrew Paiano, Kevin Hanson, Austin Thornton, and both Ferris brothers). On July 29, they confirmed the reunion by announcing their first show back in Dallas, Texas for the Monster Mosh Festival. Soon after, they also announced their first hometown show in Atlanta, Georgia since their comeback which took place on November 6, 2022. The group also said they'd be releasing new music.

On April 7, the band announced the upcoming release of a new song entitled “Ghost.” The announcement was made via a short video clip on their Instagram account, revealing the artwork for the single and a release date of April 14, 2023. The band would also release two more singles, "Red" on August 24, 2023 and "Hard to Live" on December 21, 2023.

=== New label and Daybreak (2024–present) ===
Woe, Is Me announced on social media on November 18, 2024 that they have signed with SBG Records. The band is working on a new album, to be released in 2025. This will be their third studio album, which marks almost thirteen years since the release of sophomore album, Genesi[s] in 2012.

The band would collab with Sorry X and release a cover of Evanescence's "Bring Me to Life".

On March 25, 2025, Ben Ferris announced his departure from the band. The band would then part ways with Cory Ferris a short while later. Shortly before their departures, the band had cancelled their planned Japan tour.

On April 10, 2025, the band released a single titled "Here’s to Me (A Story to Tell Pt. 2)". It would then be followed by another single titled "Devil In My Mind", released on May 23, 2025. The third single titled "Odd Behavior" (featuring guest vocals from AJ Rebollo) would be released on June 20, 2025. On July 25, 2025, The band announced that their third studio album titled Daybreak would be released on August 22, 2025. Along with the announcement, the final single from the album titled "The Closer" was also released. A music video for the track "Seminola Blvd" was released on August 22, 2025 along with the release of the album.

== Band members ==
Current

- Hance Alligood – clean vocals (2009, 2011–2013, 2022–present), unclean vocals (2022-present)
- Kevin Hanson – rhythm guitar, lead guitar (2009–2013, 2022–present)
- Michael Bohn – unclean vocals (2009–2012, 2022–present), clean vocals (2022–present)
- Andrew Paiano – lead guitar, rhythm guitar (2011–2013, 2022–present)
- Matthew Whyde – drums (2023–present)

Former

- Matt Mulkey – clean vocals (2009)
- Tim Sherrill – lead guitar (2009–2010)
- Jack Langdell – lead guitar (2010–2011)
- Geoffrey Higgins – lead guitar (2011)
- Tyler Carter – clean vocals (2009–2011)
- Doriano Magliano – unclean vocals (2012–2013)
- Brian Medley – bass guitar (2012–2013), lead guitar (2013)
- David Angle – drums (2013)
- Austin Thornton – drums, programming (2009–2013, 2022–2023)
- Ben Ferris – keyboards, programming, unclean vocals (2009–2012, 2022–2025)
- Cory Ferris – bass guitar (2009–2012, 2022–2025)

== Discography ==
Studio albums

Year	Album	Label(s)	Chart positions		
Year	Album	Label(s)	US	US Indie	US Heat
2010	Number[s]	Rise, Velocity	—	—	16
2012	Genesi[s]	Rise, Velocity	167	9	2
2025	Daybreak	SBG	—	—	—
"—" denotes a release that did not chart.

Extended plays

Year	Album title
2013	American Dream: Label : Rise, Velocity

Singles

Single	Album	Release date
"Tik Tok" (Ke$ha cover)	Non-album single	April, 2010
"[&]Delinquents"	Number[s]	July 29, 2010
"Mannequin Religion"	Number[s]	August 20, 2010
"Hot n Cold" (Katy Perry cover)	Punk Goes Pop 3	October 21, 2010
"Fame > Demise"	Number[s] Re-issue	March 21, 2011
"Vengeance"	Number[s] Re-issue	September 27, 2011
"Last Friday Night (T.G.I.F.)" (Katy Perry cover)	Punk Goes Pop 4	November 8, 2011
"I've Told You Once"	Genesi[s]	October 1, 2012
"A Story to Tell"	Genesi[s]	October 23, 2012
"Stand Up"	American Dream	June 19, 2013
"Ghost"	Non-album singles	April 14, 2023
"Red"	Non-album singles	August 24, 2023
"Hard to Live" (Feat. David Benites)	Non-album singles	December 21, 2023
"Bring Me to Life" (Evanescence cover); Collaboration with Sorry X	Non-album singles	November 22, 2024
"Here's to Me (A Story to Tell, Pt. 2)"	Daybreak	April 10, 2025
"Devil In My Mind"	Daybreak	May 23, 2025
"Odd Behavior" (Feat. AJ Rebollo)	Daybreak	June 20, 2025
"The Closer"	Daybreak	July 25, 2025

Music videos

Year	Song	Director(s)
2010	"[&] Delinquents"	Unknown
2011	"Vengeance"	Unknown
2013	"A Story to Tell"	Unknown
2025	"Here's to Me (A Story to Tell, Pt. 2)"	Alex Kouvatsos
2025	"Devil In My Mind"	Alex Kouvatsos
2025	"Odd Behavior"	Hannah Left Wright
2025	"The Closer"	Shan Dan Horan
2025	"Seminola Blvd."	Alex Kouvatsos
