= Relentless (For the Fallen Dreams album) =

Studio album by For the Fallen Dreams
- Released: July 21, 2009
- Recorded: 2009
- Studios: The Foundation Recording Studios, Connersville, Indiana
- Genres: Metalcore, melodic metalcore
- Length: 39:38
- Label: Rise
- Producers: Joey Sturgis; For the Fallen Dreams

For the Fallen Dreams chronology
Changes (2008)	Relentless (2009)	Back Burner (2011)

Relentless is the second studio album by American metalcore band For the Fallen Dreams. It is the first album to feature vocalist Dylan Richter. It was released on July 21, 2009, through Rise Records and was produced by the band themselves and Joey Sturgis. The album charted at number 29 on the Billboard Top Heatseekers chart.

== Background ==
On January 7, 2009, a demo of "Smoke Signals" was posted on the group's Myspace. In addition, it was mentioned that the group was working on their next album, aiming for its release in summer.

== Release ==
The album was released on July 21, 2009. This is the last album by For the Fallen Dreams to feature founding member and principal songwriter Andrew Tkaczyk before his departure from the band in February 2011. In July and August, the band performed on the Thrash and Burn tour.

Professional ratings
Review scores
Source	Rating
AbsolutePunk	79%
AllMusic	2.5/5 stars

== Track listing ==
No.	Title	Length
1.	"The Call Out" (instrumental)	0:35
2.	"Perceptions"	3:40
3.	"A Plethora Of"	3:19
4.	"Nightmares" (featuring Jeremy McKinnon of A Day to Remember)	3:17
5.	"December Everyday"	2:52
6.	"Defiance"	3:29
7.	"Smoke Signals"	4.59
8.	"In Sincerity"	2:30
9.	"Before I Regret"	3:20
10.	"Two Twenty Two"	3:24
11.	"Resurface the End"	4:02
12.	"The Pain Loss"	4:11
Total length:		39:38

== Personnel ==
=== For the Fallen Dreams ===
- Dylan Richter – lead vocals
- Jim Hocking – lead guitar, backing vocals
- Chris Cain – rhythm guitar
- Joe Ellis – bass guitar, backing vocals
- Andrew Tkaczyk – drums

=== Additional musicians ===
- Jeremy McKinnon of A Day to Remember – guest vocals on track 4, "Nightmares"

=== Additional personnel ===
- Joey Sturgis – production, engineering, mixing, mastering
- For the Fallen Dreams – production
- Sons of Nero and Dylan Richter – art, layout
- Phill Mamula – photography
- Alexandra McGregor – model
