= The Ascent (Secrets album) =

Studio album by Secrets
- Released: January 17, 2012
- Recorded: 2011
- Genre: Metalcore; post-hardcore
- Length: 36:42
- Label: Velocity; Rise
- Producer: Tom Denney

Secrets chronology
The Ascent (2012)	Fragile Figures (2013)

Singles from The Ascent
- 1. "The Heartless Part" Released: November 22, 2011; 2. "The Oath" Released: 2012; 3. "Somewhere in Hiding" Released: 2012; 4. "Blindside" Released: 2012

The Ascent is the debut studio album by American post-hardcore band Secrets released on January 17, 2012, through Velocity and Rise Records. The album debuted at number 3 on the Billboard Heatseekers chart, as well as the Billboard 200 at number 185. It is the only release to include original vocalist Xander Bourgeois before his departure in 2013.

== Background ==
Shortly after being signed to Velocity/Rise the band began working with ex-A Day to Remember lead guitarist Tom Denney for their debut album. In an interview with Rock Edition singer Richard Rogers noted that they had originally intended to release a 5 to 6 song EP. The record label suggested that they instead release a full-length album, and brought in Denney to assist. To afford the recording of this album, Secrets camped in a tent in a car park for 1 whole month.

== Release and promotion ==
The first single was "The Heartless Part", released November 22, 2011. The band then released several music videos over the next year for "The Oath", "Blindside", and "Somewhere in Hiding". The band toured extensively after the release to promote the album. They were on the entire 2012 Scream It Like You Mean It Tour, with label mates Hands Like Houses and In Fear and Faith. They also supported Escape the Fate on their This World Is Ours tour in 2012. They also toured as supporting acts for fellow Rise artists Sleeping with Sirens, Abandon All Ships and Conditions. Prior to this, they toured with Jamie's Elsewhere and Oh, Sleeper.

== Reception ==
Professional ratings
Review scores
Source	Rating
Allmusic	3/5 stars
Infectious	favorable
Melodic	3/5 stars
Under The Gun	(7/10)

The album was met with mostly mixed reviews. Grace Duffy of Under the Gun wrote that "There is a consistent air of indecision to The Ascent that costs it a few points, as its frequent shapeshifting doesn’t always flatter the end result. It is nonetheless a hearty and ambitious effort and a compelling listen, strikingly good at best and entertaining even at worst." Other reviewers noted that while the overall sound was quite catchy and had unique vocals, that the lyrics were somewhat generic and lacking in creativity.

== Track listing ==
No.	Title	Length
1.	"Genesis"	3:29
2.	"The Oath"	2:40
3.	"Somewhere in Hiding"	3:18
4.	"The Heartless Part"	3:51
5.	"40 Below"	2:57
6.	"Melodies"	3:32
7.	"The Best You Can't Be"	3:19
8.	"Blindside"	3:26
9.	"The Hardest Part"	3:46
10.	"You Look Good in Plastic"	2:50
11.	"The Ascent"	3:33
Total length:		37:03

== Personnel ==
Secrets

- Xander Bourgeois – unclean vocals
- Richard Rogers – rhythm guitar, clean vocals
- Michael Sherman – lead guitar
- Marc Koch – bass guitar
- Joe English – drums

Production

- Tom Denney – engineer, mixing, producer
- Billy Candler – Management
- Will Putney – Mastering
- Glenn Thomas – Artwork

== Charts ==
Chart (2012)	Peak Position
U.S Billboard Top Heatseekers	3
U.S. Billboard 200	185
U.S. Billboard Top Hard Rock	12
U.S. Billboard Top Independent	25
U.S. Billboard Top Rock	35
