= Paddock Park =

American post-hardcore band

Paddock Park was an American post-hardcore band from Ocala, Florida.

== History ==
The band was formed by harsh vocalist Brian Calzini and consisted of clean vocalist Jason Neil, drummer Bobby Scruggs, guitarists John Copeland, Timothy Brant and bassist Sanders Dukes. After the band self-released their debut EP False Hope, Paddock Park were signed to Eulogy Recordings in Summer 2008. In addition, it was announced that the band were in the process of recording their debut album at The Wade Studios with producer Andrew Wade.

The band parted ways with both of their vocalists, Calzini and Neil, during their first concert tour in the United States. While Calzini went on to form Sleeping with Sirens and We Are Defiance shortly after with Jason Neil, Paddock Park broke up shortly after Calzini and Neil left.

At the end of 2016, We Are Defiance would play a comeback show in February 2017 in Ocala with Paddock Park also performing. Calzini stated he would like to work with Paddock Park again without their former members and re-group the band.

== Discography ==
- False Hope EP (2007)
- A Hiding Place for Fake Friends (2008)
