= For the Fallen Dreams (album) =

Studio album by For the Fallen Dreams
- Released: March 10, 2023
- Recorded: 2022
- Genre: Metalcore
- Length: 37:48
- Label: Arising Empire
- Producer: Jonathan Dolese

For the Fallen Dreams chronology
Six (2018)	For the Fallen Dreams (2023)

Singles from For the Fallen Dreams
- 1. "What If" Released: June 21, 2022; 2. "Sulfate" Released: August 5, 2022; 3. "Re-Animate" Released: September 6, 2022; 4. "No Heaven" Released: October 20, 2022; 5. "Last One Out" Released: January 19, 2023

For the Fallen Dreams is the seventh studio album by American metalcore band For the Fallen Dreams. It was released on March 10, 2023, through Arising Empire and was produced by Jonathan Dolese. The album is the band's first studio release with the label.

== Background and promotion ==
On February 19, 2021, the band confirmed that they had begun recording the album. On June 17, 2022, the band revealed that they had parted ways with Rise Records and signed with Arising Empire. On June 21, following a series of teasers released on various social media, the band unveiled the first single entitled "What If" along with a music video. On August 5, the band released the second single titled "Sulfate".

On September 6, the band published the third single "Re-Animate" and its corresponding music video. On October 20, the band released the fourth single "No Heaven" and an accompanying music video. On January 19, 2023, the band premiered the fifth single "Last One Out" with a music video. At the same time, they revealed the album itself, the album cover, the track list, and release date. The music video for "Without You" was released March 10, 2023, coinciding with the album release.

== Track listing ==
Adapted from Apple Music.

For the Fallen Dreams track listing
No.	Title	Length
1.	"RE-Animate"	3:19
2.	"What If"	3:58
3.	"Last One Out"	3:28
4.	"Without You"	3:28
5.	"Testify"	3:02
6.	"Searching..."	4:07
7.	"Suprapersonal"	3:04
8.	"No Heaven"	3:24
9.	"Sulfate"	3:36
10.	"Lavender"	2:49
11.	"Chemicals"	3:33
Total length:		37:48

== Personnel ==
For the Fallen Dreams

- Chad Ruhlig – lead vocals
- Jim Hocking – lead guitar, clean vocals
- Damon Austen Tate – rhythm guitar
- Kalan Blehm – bass
- Marc Esses – drums

Additional personnel

- Jonathan Dolese – production
