= Wasted Youth (For the Fallen Dreams album) =

Studio album by For the Fallen Dreams
- Released: July 17, 2012
- Recorded: February 2012
- Studio: Diamond Studios, Ocala, Florida; West West Side Music, New York
- Genre: Metalcore, post-hardcore
- Length: 43:35
- Label: Artery
- Producer: Tom Denney; For the Fallen Dreams

For the Fallen Dreams chronology
Back Burner (2011)	Wasted Youth (2012)	Heavy Hearts (2014)

Singles from Wasted Youth
- 1. "Hollow" Released: May 16, 2012

Wasted Youth is the fourth studio album by American metalcore band For the Fallen Dreams. It was released on July 17, 2012, and was produced by the band themselves and Tom Denney. It is their only album to be released through Artery Recordings since their departure from Rise Records (with whom they would later re-sign), as well as the first album by the band to feature bassist Brandon Stastny and the only record to feature Dylan Shippey on drums. It is also the last record by the band to feature guitarist Kalan Blehm and vocalist Dylan Richter, who featured on the two last records.

This album shows a bit of departure from their previous style with the introduction of post-hardcore-ish choruses and technical drumming.

Professional ratings
Review scores
Source	Rating
Blabbermouth.net	5.5/10
Dead Press!	4/10
Rock Sound	7/10

== Track listing ==
No.	Title	Length
1.	"Hollow"	3:59
2.	"Resolvent Feelings"	3:37
3.	"Please Don't Hurt"	4:29
4.	"Until It Runs Out"	3:12
5.	"Sober"	3:28
6.	"Living a Lie"	3:26
7.	"Always About You"	3:42
8.	"Moving Forward"	3:21
9.	"Your Funeral"	3:09
10.	"When Push Comes to Shove"	3:19
11.	"No One to Blame"	2:58
12.	"Waking Up Alone"	2:03
13.	"Pretending"	2:52
Total length:		43:35

== Personnel ==
For the Fallen Dreams

- Dylan Richter – lead vocals
- Jim Hocking – lead guitar, backing vocals
- Kalan Blehm – rhythm guitar, backing vocals
- Brandon Stastny – bass, backing vocals
- Dylan Shippey – drums

Additional personnel

- Tom Denney – production, engineering, mixing
- For the Fallen Dreams – production, engineering
- Alan Douches – mastering
- Ryan Nelson (The Artery Foundation) – management
- Matt Andersen (The Pantheon Agency, US) and Nanouk de Meijere (Avocado Booking, EU) – booking
- Dylan Richter – photography, layout
