= We Are Defiance =

American metalcore band

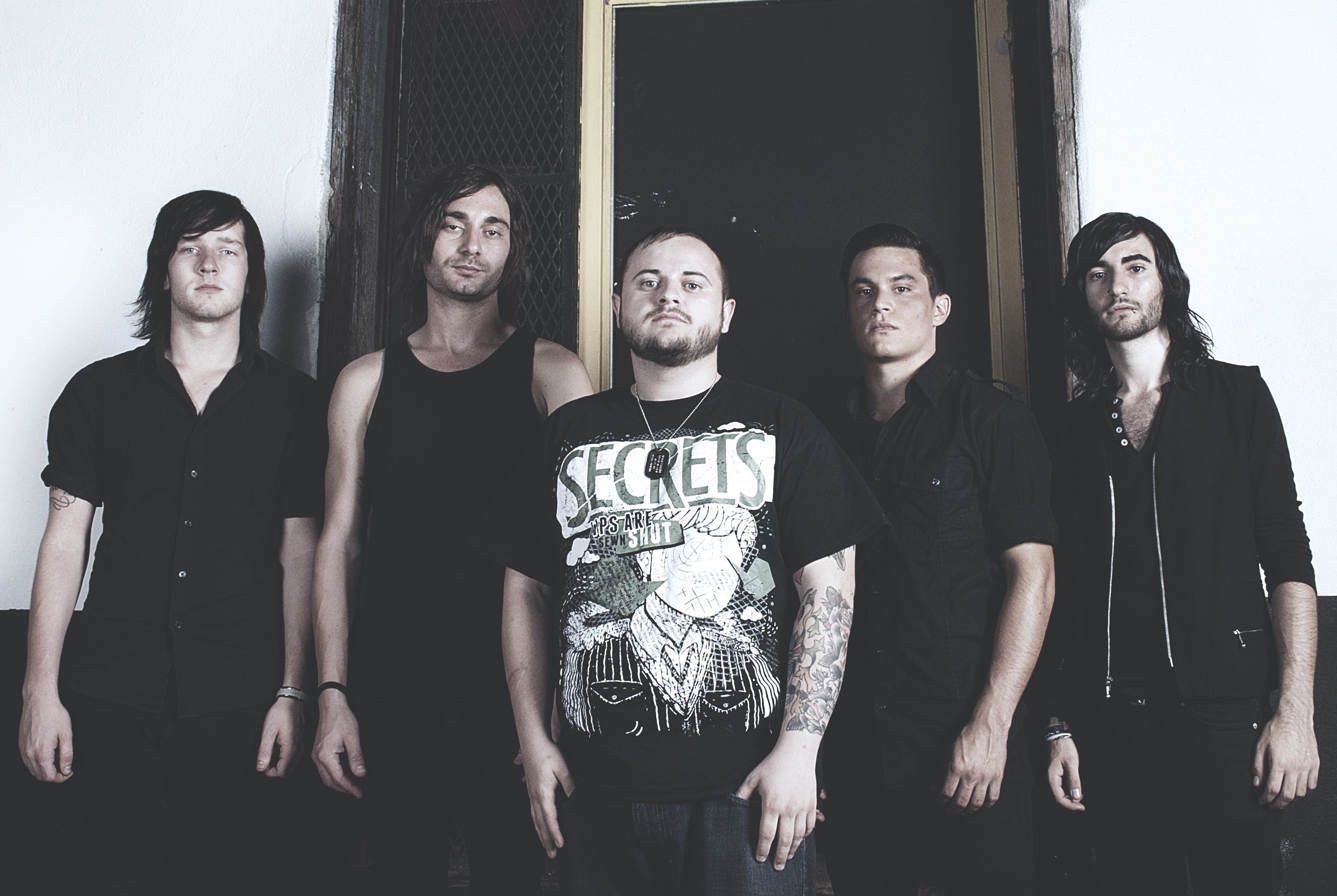

Background information
- Origin: Ocala, Florida, U.S.
- Genres: Metalcore; Post-hardcore
- Years active: 2009–2015; 2017–present
- Label: Tragic Hero
- Members: Brian Calzini; Dean Dragonas; Josh Gowing; Rik Stevely; Andi Encinas; Jason Neil

We Are Defiance is an American metalcore band from Ocala, Florida, United States. Founded in 2009 by former Sleeping with Sirens and Paddock Park singer Brian Calzini, the band released their only album, Trust in Few, in early 2011 on Tragic Hero.

== History ==
=== Formation and early recordings (2009) ===
We Are Defiance was formed in April 2009 by former Paddock Park vocalist Brian Calzini. On May 13, 2009, the band posted the track "It's a Long Drive Home from Texas" on their MySpace profile. It was announced to be part of the Let's Forget Regret (2009) EP, which was released on August 1. The EP was produced by Tom Denney, formerly of A Day to Remember. Following a slight line up change, the band released their first single, "To the Moon" on September 5, 2009 on iTunes.

=== Trust in Few (2010–11) ===
We Are Defiance quickly gained a loyal fan base and announced to have signed a deal with Tragic Hero Records on May 1, 2010. The band started writing on new material for their debut album. The band released a cover of B.o.B's "Airplanes" featuring Kellin Quinn of Sleeping with Sirens and Denney, on July 8; on the same say the band's then-untitled debut album was set for release "this fall". The band toured with Kid Liberty between July 21 and August 9, in the U.S., before shortly going on tour throughout the rest of August with Dr. Acula, Ender, and Armor for the Broken. On November 29, We Are Defiance started a tour through the U.S., touring with I Am Ghost and label mates This Romantic Tragedy. On December 12, it was announced the band's debut album, Trust in Few (2011), was to be released on March 15, 2011.

At the beginning of 2011, the band went on the Change the World Tour touring through the U.S. together with Monsters, Legend and Dr. Acula. On that tour, the band had a van accident and singer Calzini was brought into the hospital and had to undergo surgery. The reason for that crash was freezing rain. Because of that crash the album's release was delayed until on March 29, 2011, instead of the planned March 15 date. Trust in Few was produced by Denney. Calzini announced that Tyler Smith of The Word Alive and Danny Worsnop of Asking Alexandria would be featured on one song each, on the album, but Worsnop was pulled off from being featured on the record by his label. Fans were allowed to download this song at the band's campaign they started via Twitter called Tweet for a Track. The album peaked at number 28 on the Billboards Heatseekers charts.

The band then went on the I Heard It First Tour with Oh, Sleeper and Like Moths to Flames from March 29 to April 6. The band also played the 2011's SXSW together with Horse the Band, Letlive and For the Fallen Dreams as part of the Blood Company Showcase at the Emo's Annex in Austin, Texas. In May and into June, the band went on the Never Back Down Tour with It Prevails, Life on Repeat, Affiance, and Stand Your Ground. The band went on the Metal East Tour, with bands Scarlett O'Hara, Casino Madrid, and Wolves Among Men, from June 29 to August 1. The band went on The Beautiful & Spineless Tour, with No Bragging Rights headlining, and It Prevails, and Onward to Olympas supporting, from early August into mid September, and toured through the rest of September and into mid October on the Circle of Friends Tour with Thick as Blood, Legend, and The Plot in You. In December 2011 We Are Defiance headlined their first U.S. tour, the Bring Your Scarf and Jacket Tour, with support from are My Ticket Home and Wolves Among Men; the tour lasted from December 9 to 18.

=== Live & Learn and break-up (2012–15) ===
The band released a new single in January 2012 on iTunes, entitled "Day Late, Doller Short". From February 9 to March 1, We Are Defiance started a tour through the U.S. with This Romantic Tragedy and The Last of Our Kind, titled New Year to Fear Tour. A month later, the band went on The Walking Revival Tour, with The Great Commission headlining, and Serianna, Convictions, and Your Memorial supporting, from April 16 to May 13. On May 29, guitarist Andi Encinas stated he was parting from We Are Defiance on Facebook. The band released a new music video for "I'm Gonna Bury You Underground Eli" on June 1. In August, the band co-headlined the Drink Yourself To Sleep Tour with Us, From Outside, and with City Lights and To Each His Own supporting. A lyric video for "Sincerity" was released on September 28, and it was mentioned that the band were planning to record their following album later in 2012, with a projected release date of spring 2013. In December, Calzini stated that the delay for a new album's was due to producer Denney being in studio with his former band A Day to Remember, whose record took longer than intended for production. Calzini also stated that the band had recently brought in Evolve Management to aid the band in its future.

At the beginning of 2013, the band joined the second leg of the 3rd annual A Metal Christmas & A Heavy New Year Tour, supporting Close to Home with The Overseer, One Year Later and From Atlantis. On February 14, 2013, the band premiered a lyric video for their new single, "Hurricane You". In May, it was announced that the band would record a new album with producers Andrew Wade and Denney at Diamond Studios. The album would be called Live & Learn, and planned to be released by Tragic Hero, with "Hurricane You" featuring on it.

On April 3, 2015, the band called it quits for personal reasons of each band member.

=== Reunion (2016–present) ===
On September 27, 2016, the band posted a picture on their Twitter page suggesting a return in 2017. On October 14, the band announced their return and their first tour date since their hiatus, which was on February 17, 2017, in Ocala, Florida. They played another show in 2019, and they said that the final Live and Learn album would be released in its entirety.

In 2021 the band released the song "Regret" written by vocalist Jason Neil, signifying his return to the group.

== Band members ==
Current Line-Up

- Brian Calzini – unclean vocals (2009–2015, 2017–present)
- Dean Dragonas – rhythm guitar (2009–2015, 2017–present); lead guitar (2012–2014)
- Rik Stevely – bass (2009–2015, 2017–present)
- Josh Gowing – drums (2009–2015, 2017–present); clean vocals (2011–2015, 2017–2021)
- Andi Encinas – lead guitar (2009–2012, 2014–2015, 2017–present)
- Jason Neil – clean vocals (2009–2011, 2021–present)

Timeline

== Discography ==
Studio albums

- Trust in Few (2011)

EPs

- Let's Forget Regret (2009)

Singles

- 2009: "It's a Long Drive Home from Texas" (featuring Austin Carlile of Of Mice & Men)
- 2009: "To the Moon"
- 2011: "I'm Gonna Bury You Underground, Eli"
- 2013: "Hurricane You" (featuring Liz Loughrey)
- 2021: "Regret"
- 2021: "Giving Up"
