= Changes (For the Fallen Dreams album) =

Studio album by For the Fallen Dreams
- Released: January 8, 2008
- Recorded: 2007
- Studios: The Foundation Recording Studios, Connersville, Indiana
- Genres: Srscore, metalcore
- Length: 34:17
- Label: Rise
- Producer: Joey Sturgis

For the Fallen Dreams chronology
New Beginnings EP (2007)	Changes (2008)	Relentless (2009)

Changes is the debut studio album by American metalcore band For the Fallen Dreams. It was released on January 8, 2008, through Rise Records and was produced by Joey Sturgis.

== Release ==
On July 23, 2007, the band announced they had signed to Rise Records. On September 9, the group announced they would release an album in late fall. On the same day, "Brothers in Arms" was posted on their Myspace account. The album was released through Rise Records on January 8, 2008. In January and February, the band embarked on the Rise Records Tour alongside Every Bridge Burned, Recon, American Me, and It Prevails. In February and March 2009, the band went on a tour of the UK and Europe alongside A Day to Remember and Azriel.

Professional ratings
Review scores
Source	Rating
AllMusic	2.5/5 stars

== Track listing ==
No.	Title	Length
1.	"Brothers in Arms"	2:59
2.	"New Beginnings"	3:40
3.	"Hopeless"	3:20
4.	"Last Dying Breath"	3:28
5.	"This World Around Us"	2:11
6.	"Never Again"	4:25
7.	"Changes" (instrumental)	2:02
8.	"Vengeance" (featuring Chris Aslip of Suffocate Faster)	2:59
9.	"Falling Down" (featuring Matt Hasting of MyChildren MyBride)	3:22
10.	"Through the Looking Glass"	5:51
Total length:		34:17

== Personnel ==
=== For the Fallen Dreams ===
- Chad Ruhlig – lead vocals
- Jim Hocking – lead guitar, backing vocals on track 10, "Through the Looking Glass"
- Marcus Morgan – rhythm guitar
- Joe Ellis – bass guitar, backing vocals
- Andrew Tkaczyk – drums, songwriting

=== Additional musicians ===
- Chris Aslip of Suffocate Faster – guest vocals on track 8, "Vengeance"
- Matt Hasting of MyChildren MyBride – guest vocals on track 9, "Falling Down"

=== Additional personnel ===
- Joey Sturgis – production, engineering, mixing, mastering, setup, programming
- Chris Rubey of The Devil Wears Prada – design, layout
