= Renditions (EP) =

EP by Secrets
- Released: April 7, 2015
- Recorded: Early 2015
- Genre: Acoustic
- Length: 14:07
- Labels: Velocity; Rise
- Producer: Beau Burchell

Secrets chronology
Fragile Figures (2013)	Renditions (2015)	Everything That Got Us Here (2015)

Professional ratings
Review scores
Source	Rating
It's All Dead	4/5 stars
Ghost Cult Magazine	9/10 stars
Thinking Lyrically	7/10 stars
Musicology Online	6/10 stars

Renditions is an extended play by American post-hardcore band Secrets. It was released through Velocity and Rise Records on April 7, 2015. The album consists of three stripped-down acoustic version of songs previously released on their second album Fragile Figures, and one brand new track "What's Left of Us".

== Reception ==
The EP has been met with generally positive reviews. Critics commended the band on the stripped down sound achieved, and lead vocalist, Richard Roger's vocals. Writing for It's All Dead reviewer Kiel Hauck wrote, "What makes Renditions unique is its simplicity. This isn’t some experimental endeavor for the band – it’s a bare bones presentation in every sense of the word... cementing the band’s songwriting prowess and adding a new dimension to a handful of already impressive tracks." Julie Conpo of Ghost Cult Magazine said, "The vocals are powerful and soulful, allowing you to completely absorb the lyrics and theme of the song. The almost orchestral sound is impressive and proves that Secrets are not just a one-trick pony; their music is universal and they are talented musicians." and went on to give the EP a 9 out of 10 rating. Eddie Sims, of Musicology Online wrote a mixed review in which he appreciates the band's effort, but says that the acoustic versions fall short compared to the originals.

== Track listing ==
No.	Title	Length
1.	"Forever and Never"	3:15
2.	"Dance of the Dead"	2:50
3.	"Fragile Figures"	3:15
4.	"What's Left of Us"	4:42
