= Heavy Hearts =

Studio album by For the Fallen Dreams
- Released: April 4, 2014
- Genre: Metalcore, melodic hardcore
- Length: 41:17
- Label: Rise
- Producer: Josh Schroeder

For the Fallen Dreams chronology
| Wasted Youth (2012) | Heavy Hearts (2014) | Six (2018) |

Singles from Heavy Hearts
- 1. "Emerald Blue" Released: February 26, 2014

Heavy Hearts is the fifth studio album by American metalcore band For the Fallen Dreams. It was released on April 4, 2014, through Rise Records and was produced by Josh Schroeder.

Professional ratings
Review scores
| Source | Rating |
|---|---|
| Alternative Press | 3/5 stars |
| Sputnikmusic | 3.5/5 stars |

== Track listing ==
| No. | Title | Length |
|---|---|---|
| 1. | "Emerald Blue" | 4:36 |
| 2. | "Choke" | 4:37 |
| 3. | "Lights" | 4:36 |
| 4. | "Dream Eater" (featuring Garret Rapp of The Color Morale) | 3:53 |
| 5. | "Bombay" | 4:09 |
| 6. | "Mimic" | 4:10 |
| 7. | "Endless" | 3:50 |
| 8. | "Amnesia" | 4:21 |
| 9. | "Unfinished Business" | 3:22 |
| 10. | "Smelling Salt" (featuring Landon Tewers of The Plot in You) | 3:43 |
| Total length: | | 41:17 |

== Personnel ==
For the Fallen Dreams

- Chad Ruhlig – unclean vocals
- Jim Hocking – guitars, clean vocals
- Brandon Stastny – bass, backing vocals
- Navid Naghdi – drums

Additional musicians

- Garret Rapp of The Color Morale – guest vocals on track 4, "Dream Eater"
- Landon Tewers of The Plot in You – guest vocals on track 10, "Smelling Salt"

Additional personnel

- Josh Schroeder – production, mixing, mastering, engineering
- Orie McGiness – artwork
- Andrew Tkaczyk – additional composing on track 1, "Emerald Blue"
- Barney Durrett – photography

== Charts ==
| Chart (2014) | Peak positions |
|---|---|
| US Billboard 200 | 162 |
| US Top Heatseekers | 3 |
| US Independent Albums | 27 |
| US Rock Albums | 33 |
| US Hard Rock Albums | 12 |
