= Back Burner =

Studio album by For the Fallen Dreams
- Released: May 24, 2011
- Genre: Metalcore
- Length: 38:37
- Label: Rise
- Producer: Tom Denney

For the Fallen Dreams chronology
Relentless (2009)	Back Burner (2011)	Wasted Youth (2012)

Singles from Back Burner
- 1. "My Anthem-Like Symphony" Released: April 13, 2011; 2. "Strange Faces" Released: July 12, 2011

Back Burner is the third studio album by American metalcore band For the Fallen Dreams. It was released on May 24, 2011, through Rise Records and was produced by Tom Denney. Back Burner is the first album not to feature original drummer and primary songwriter Andrew Tkaczyk and final for Rise Records before their subsequent contractual release from the label.

== Background ==
Following up from the band's previous record, Relentless, the group began writing for Back Burner by the ending months of 2010 and traveled out to Ocala, Florida to begin recording for it by the next year.

At the time of its recording, For the Fallen Dreams lacked a bassist, so the bass guitar parts were performed by the band's guitarists, Jim Hocking and Kalan Blehm.

Back Burner is the first release by the band to feature more consistent use of clean vocal passages; on most verses there is clean singing, and only two songs on the album don't feature clean vocals in the choruses ("Let Go" and "Fist Fight").

== Release ==
It was released on May 24, 2011 through Rise Records, and was produced by Tom Denney, the former guitarist of A Day to Remember. A few days later, the band made an appearance at Bled Fest.

Professional ratings
Review scores
Source	Rating
Alternative Reviews	8/10 stars
Rockfreaks.net	7/10 stars
Under the Gun Review	8.5/10 stars

== Track listing ==
No.	Title	Length
1.	"Say What You Will"	3:10
2.	"Deep Down Inside"	3:06
3.	"Complicate the Situation"	3:50
4.	"Only Unopened Arms"	3:07
5.	"My Anthem-Like Symphony"	2:47
6.	"The Big Empty"	3:52
7.	"Bottom Feeders"	2:42
8.	"Don't Give Up, Don't Give In"	3:13
9.	"The Human Collective"	3:06
10.	"Let Go"	3:02
11.	"Yellow" (featuring Mike Duce of Lower Than Atlantis)	3:19
12.	"Fist Fight"	3:23
Total length:		38:37

iTunes bonus tracks
No.	Title	Length
13.	"Strange Faces"	3:04
Total length:		41:41

== Personnel ==
For the Fallen Dreams

- Dylan Richter – lead vocals
- Jim Hocking – lead guitar, backing vocals, bass
- Kalan Blehm – rhythm guitar, backing vocals, bass

Additional musicians

- Mike Duce of Lower Than Atlantis – guest vocals on track 11, "Yellow"
- Will Weatherly – drums

Additional personnel

- Tom Denney – production, engineering, mixing
- For the Fallen Dreams – engineering
- Landon Tewers of The Plot in You – production on bonus track "Strange Faces"
- Justin Reich – photography, layout
