= Numbers (Woe, Is Me album) =

Number[s]

Studio album by Woe, Is Me
- Released: August 30, 2010
- Genre: Metalcore; electronicore; post-hardcore
- Length: 28:57
- Label: Rise; Velocity
- Producer: Cameron Mizell

Woe, Is Me chronology
Number[s] (2010)	Genesi[s] (2012)

Number[s] is the debut studio album by American metalcore band Woe, Is Me, released on August 30, 2010, through Rise Records and its imprint division Velocity. A re-release of the record was released on July 16, 2012 with Andrew Paiano and Hance Alligood due to the departure of Tim Sherrill and Tyler Carter. Number[s] was produced by Cameron Mizell in his Orlando, Florida hometown. The sole guest vocalist on the album is Jonny Craig.

== Release ==
Upon the release of Number[s], it charted at number 16 on Billboard's Top Heatseekers chart, selling 1,700 copies in its first week. Two songs were released before the album itself: "[&] Delinquents" on July 29, 2010, and "Mannequin Religion" on August 20, 2010. The demo versions of three songs, "Hell, or High Water", "If Not, for Ourselves", and "I." had also been previously released.

=== Deluxe Edition ===
A re-issue of the album released July 17, 2012 featured songs with new vocalist Hance Alligood, who replaced Tyler Carter, and new guitarist Andrew Paiano. New vocalist Doriano Magliano, who replaced Michael Bohn, and new bassist Brian Medley were in the band at the time of the Deluxe Edition's release but do not appear on any of the recordings. Doriano and Brian would make their recording debut with the band on the follow-up Genesis (Woe, Is Me album).

All tracks that saw prior releases, both from the original album and the two newer singles from 2011, have been slightly changed on this release. This is made most evident by many differences heard in the beginning and ending of songs - largely re-arranging how the tracks bleed into each other.

== Reception ==
Professional ratings
Review scores
Source	Rating
AbsolutePunk	(66%)
Lexington Music Press	(7.5/10)
Corezine	(8.5/10)

The album gained mixed to positive reception from critics, with Lexington Music Press saying that it "certainly gets better and better as it plays through and tries more out with its formula." However, they said that the during the first half of the album, "several songs share the same basic formula, keeping them from reaching the potential heights they could." The apparent stand out song was "Hell, or High Water", as they said it included "stand out and memorable moments, such as the hauntingly beautiful bridge (though the breakdown that follows is definitely noteworthy as well)." The review closed positively, saying that Number[s] was "quite an explosive debut that will surely help Woe, Is Me rise the ranks quickly."

Max Grundström of Corezine also gave the album a highly praising review, saying that he was "expecting Woe, Is Me to be another run-of-the-mill, whiny post-hardcore band", but that his "mind was blown when [he] started listening to the intro." He said that they "mix catchy verses and bridges with bone crushing breakdowns, and even though it’s often encountered in modern metalcore/post-hardcore, Woe, Is Me succeed in keeping it fresh." He essentially closes the review with: "In a sea with similar acts Woe, Is Me somewhat drift with the other debris, but still manages to stay afloat."

Ryan Gardner, a writer at AbsolutePunk, gave the album a mostly positive review, saying that "Number[s] effectively combines elements found in bands such as labelmates In Fear and Faith and even Emarosa in the clean singing department; the clean vocals are spot on, the screams well placed (for the most part), and the musicianship is definitely there." He used tracks "[&] Delinquents" and "Keep Your Enemies Close" to state that "Michael Bohn can surely scream", and said that he believed "I" "switches back and forth from Woe, Is Me's heaviest material to their most melodic, featuring some of the best lyrics on Number[s]." He closed the review with

While Woe, Is Me are in no way a unique band, they do take all they have learned about their genre and successfully accumulate the sound into this disc. If they can continue to experiment and perhaps find ways to stand out above similar acts in the genre, Woe, Is Me could easily headline stages alongside heavy bands.

== Track listing ==
No.	Title	Length
1.	"On Veiled Men"	0:50
2.	"(&) Delinquents"	2:56
3.	"Mannequin Religion"	2:54
4.	"Keep Your Enemies Close"	2:28
5.	"Hell, or High Water"	3:40
6.	"For the Likes of You"	3:42
7.	"I"	3:03
8.	"Our Number[s]" (featuring Jonny Craig)	2:55
9.	"If Not, for Ourselves"	4:30
10.	"Desolate (The Conductor)" (featuring Jonny Craig)	1:54
Total length:		28:52

Deluxe reissue
No.	Title	Length
1.	"Vengeance"	4:09
2.	"Fame > Demise" (Caleb Shomo Remix)	4:20
3.	"We R Who We R" (Kesha cover)	3:37
4.	"(&) Delinquents" (Caleb Shomo Remix)	4:04
5.	"Fame > Demise"	3:28
6.	"Fame > Demise" (Acoustic)	2:48
7.	"On Veiled Men"	0:50
8.	"(&) Delinquents"	2:58
9.	"Mannequin Religion"	2:54
10.	"Keep Your Enemies Close"	2:26
11.	"Hell, or High Water"	3:36
12.	"For the Likes of You"	3:39
13.	"I."	3:12
14.	"Our Number[s]" (featuring Jonny Craig)	2:52
15.	"If Not, for Ourselves"	4:34
16.	"Desolate (The Conductor)" (featuring Jonny Craig)	1:55
Total length:		51:22

== Personnel ==
Woe, Is Me line-up on standard issue

- Tyler Carter – clean vocals
- Michael Bohn – screamed vocals
- Tim Sherrill – lead guitar
- Kevin Hanson – rhythm guitar
- Cory Ferris – bass guitar
- Ben Ferris – keyboards, growled vocals
- Austin Thornton – drums, programming

Woe, Is Me line-up on re-issue

- Hance Alligood – clean vocals (tracks 1, 3, 6)
- Tyler Carter – clean vocals (tracks 2, 4, 5, 7–16)
- Michael Bohn – screamed vocals
- Andrew Paiano – lead guitar (tracks 1–4, 6)
- Geoffrey Higgins – lead guitar (track 5)
- Kevin Hanson – rhythm guitar
- Cory Ferris – bass guitar
- Ben Ferris – keyboards, growled vocals
- Austin Thornton – drums, programming

Additional musicians

- Jonny Craig – additional vocals on tracks 8 and 10 (tracks 14 and 16 on re-issue)
- Caleb Shomo – remixes on tracks 2 and 4 (re-issue)

Production

- Produced by Cameron Mizell @ Chango Studios
- Mastering by Joey Sturgis @ Foundation Studios
- Produced by Caleb Shomo (reissue tracks 1 and 3)
