= American Dream (Woe, Is Me EP) =

EP by Woe, Is Me
- Released: August 20, 2013
- Genre: Metalcore; acoustic rock
- Length: 18:26
- Label: Rise
- Producer: Tom Denney

Woe, Is Me chronology
| Genesi[s] (2012) | American Dream (2013) | Daybreak (2025) |

American Dream is the first EP by American metalcore band Woe, Is Me. It was released on August 20, 2013, through Rise Records, produced by Tom Denney, and mixed and mastered by Cameron Mizell. Although released digitally through all major outlets, a physical version of the EP was made available solely through Best Buy stores. It is the band's first release not to feature founding member Austin Thornton on drums and the band's only release to feature David Angle on drums.

== Track listing ==
| No. | Title | Length |
|---|---|---|
| 1. | "Stand Up" | 3:44 |
| 2. | "American Dream" (featuring Danny Leal of Upon a Burning Body) | 3:49 |
| 3. | "A Voice of Hope" | 3:49 |
| 4. | "Restless Nights" | 3:07 |
| 5. | "Fine Without You" | 3:57 |
| Total length: | | 18:26 |

== Personnel ==
- Doriano Magliano – unclean vocals
- Hance Alligood – clean vocals
- Andrew Paiano – rhythm guitar
- Kevin Hanson – lead guitar
- Brian Medley – bass guitar
- David Angle – drums
