= Brian Calzini =

American singer

Brian John Williams
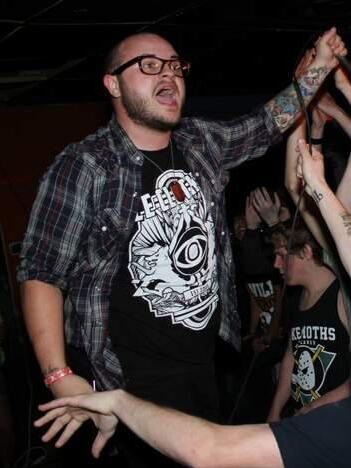
- Calzini performing with We Are Defiance in 2012.

Background information
- Genres: Metalcore; post-hardcore
- Occupation: Musician
- Instrument: Vocals
- Labels: Eulogy; Tragic Hero
- Member of: We Are Defiance
- Formerly of: Paddock Park; Sleeping with Sirens

Brian Calzini is an American metalcore vocalist. He formed bands Paddock Park, Sleeping with Sirens and We Are Defiance, his current band.

== Early life ==
Calzini is also known as Brian John Williams.

== Music career ==
Williams's musical career began when he started recording a song named I´ll Swing My Fists together with Tom Denney formerly of A Day To Remember. Williams uploaded the song to his MySpace profile and started a solo musical project called '"Paddock Park". He later found a live band to perform his songs live and formed the band as Paddock Park, with whom he recorded his first song "I'll Swing My Fists" for their debut EP False Hope, in 2007. The band was later signed by Eulogy Recordings, where they released their first full-length album A Hiding Place for Fake Friends, which featured a re-recording of the same song. In 2009, the band was disbanded.

Almost immediately after Paddock Park's end, Williams went on to form Sleeping With Sirens with former member of Uprising Records band Broadway, Nick Trombino. Finding members from Orlando, Florida and a singer Kellin Quinn from Oregon. Williams spent two weeks with the band in Orlando, Florida writing together in a studio then went on to record The Bomb.com and Big Gulps. Williams soon after recording parted ways with the band with Quinn taking over all vocals. He has stated in interviews Quinn wanted the band to go in a different direction and there was no harsh feeling between him and former bandmates. Soon after Williams went on to create his current band We Are Defiance. The band recorded a few songs in 2009, including a cover of B.o.B's popular song "Airplanes", featuring Tom Denney and former bandmate Kellin Quinn (Sleeping with Sirens). In 2010, the band started touring extensively as well as working on their debut album with producer Tom Denney. We Are Defiance signed to Tragic Hero Records and released their debut album called Trust in Few which was released worldwide. Trust In Few was released on March 15, 2011. The album peaked at 28 on Billboard Heatseekers for one week.

== Film ==
In 2022, Calzini played himself in the Netflix series The Most Hated Man on the Internet.

== Influences ==
Williams has stated in interviews his music influences range from acoustic music, pop, and metal.

== Discography ==
Paddock Park

- 2007: With False Hope (EP)
- 2008: A Hiding Place for Fake Friends (Eulogy Recordings)

Sleeping with Sirens

- 2009: Bomb(dot)com, Big Gulps

We Are Defiance

- 2011: Trust in Few (Tragic Hero Records)
