= Six (For the Fallen Dreams album) =

Studio album by For the Fallen Dreams
- Released: February 16, 2018
- Genre: Metalcore
- Length: 40:28
- Label: Rise
- Producer: Josh Schroeder

For the Fallen Dreams chronology
| Heavy Hearts (2014) | Six (2018) | For the Fallen Dreams (2023) |

Singles from Six
- 1. "Stone" Released: January 12, 2018; 2. "Ten Years" Released: February 9, 2018

Six is the sixth studio album by American metalcore band For the Fallen Dreams. It was released on February 16, 2018, through Rise Records and was produced by Josh Schroeder. It is their last album to be released on this label before the band signed to Arising Empire in 2022.

== Background and promotion ==
On January 12, 2018, Rise Records released their first single "Stone" and its corresponding music video. On February 9, 2018, the band released their second single "Ten Years".

On March 14, 2018, the music video for "Unstoppable" off of Six was debuted. Bassist Brandon Stastny shot and edited the video. In a brief interview the band told of how the video was shot in their home-state of Michigan a few hundred yards off the coastline on the Lake Michigan shelf ice formations which occur every winter. The day the video was shot was the only clear and sunny day during that month so it couldn't have been more perfect, they explained.

Professional ratings
Review scores
| Source | Rating |
|---|---|
| Alternative Press | 8/10 |
| Distorted Sound | 6/10 |
| New Noise | 4/5 stars |
| Sputnikmusic | 3/5 stars |

== Track listing ==
| No. | Title | Length |
|---|---|---|
| 1. | "Stone" | 4:17 |
| 2. | "The Undertow" | 3:51 |
| 3. | "Unstoppable" | 4:04 |
| 4. | "Forever" | 3:31 |
| 5. | "Burning Season" | 3:41 |
| 6. | "Two Graves" | 4:06 |
| 7. | "Ten Years" | 4:31 |
| 8. | "Hypnosis" | 4:18 |
| 9. | "Void" | 4:12 |
| 10. | "The Storm" | 3:57 |
| Total length: | | 40:28 |

== Personnel ==
For the Fallen Dreams

- Chad Ruhlig – lead vocals
- Jim Hocking – guitars, clean vocals
- Brandon Stastny – bass, backing vocals
- Marc Esses – drums

Additional personnel

- Josh Schroeder – production, mixing, mastering, engineering
