= Genesi(s) =

Genesi[s]

Studio album by Woe, Is Me
- Released: November 20, 2012
- Recorded: July–September 2012; Chango Studios, FL
- Genre: Metalcore; easycore; djent
- Length: 31:17
- Label: Rise; Velocity
- Producer: Cameron Mizell

Woe, Is Me chronology
Number(s) (2010)	Genesi[s] (2012)	American Dream (2013)

Genesi[s] is the second album by metalcore band, Woe, Is Me. The album was released on November 20, 2012. It is the first album to feature Doriano Magliano, Hance Alligood, Brian Medley, and Andrew Paiano (formerly of Abandon All Ships), and the last album featuring Austin Thornton on drums before their reunion in 2022. Genesi[s] is noted for being the band's first album since the departure of original members Michael Bohn, Tyler Carter, Cory and Ben Ferris, and Tim Sherrill. The entire album was produced by Cameron Mizell.

== Background ==
In June, Woe, Is Me entered the studio to record their second studio album, entitled Genesi[s]. The band spent two months recording and producing the album, and finished around mid September. The band stated during the time of recording, drummer Austin Thornton's computer crashed and the band had to do pre-production all over again. Genesi[s] was set to release on October 12, 2012. On a website called "thearteryfoundation.com" four tracks as well as the album title were confirmed. The song "A Story to Tell" has lyrics that have the same name as the TYSWGYAR Tour. The lyrics are "You don't have the backbone that everyone believes you do, so go ahead and talk your shit. I'll give you a reason to." The album title "Genesis" is symbolic of a new beginning for the band. The first single "I've Told You Once" was released on October 2, 2012 and debuted number 4 on the iTunes Top 10 Rock Charts. The second single "A Story to Tell" was released via YouTube on the 23rd of October. Singer Hance Alligood stated that there would be one more single to be released before the album was released in its entirety, but this did not come to fruition.

== Reception ==
Professional ratings
Review scores
Source	Rating
AbsolutePunk	5%
AllMusic	3/5 stars
Alternative Press	3.5/5 stars
Mind Equals Blown	2/10

Genesi[s] has been critically panned, with much of the only praise being attributed to clean vocalist Hance Alligood. Steve Alcala of Mind Equals Blown gave the album a 2/10, heavily criticizing the album's instrumentals, specifically the guitars of which he stated, "Playing the same note over and over is not making music. It's making a tone. The only guitar work featured on the album is open note chugging, djent rhythms that require a quick tap of the third, fifth, seventh, or twelfth fret that jumps right back to its root open note. Oh, and power chords. Lots and lots of power chords. Spice it up? Make it interesting? Please? There is absolutely no branching out on Genesi[s]."

Some positive comments of the album exist, however. Matthew Colwell of Alternative Press gave the album a positive review, giving it a 3.5/5. He wrote "at times, the album follows the post-hardcore rulebook word-for-word with super-tight production and sing-scream dynamics, yet it simultaneously showcases a competent band who know their niche." He closed the review by saying "...if nothing else, Genesi[s] shows that Woe is still solid as a rock, despite a changing of the guard." Gregory Heaney of AllMusic said "While the album doesn't show a whole lot in the way of growth, it does represent a rebirth of a sort for the band." and continued "Despite everything that's happened to the band, what's really important here is that Genesi[s] is a pretty solid album, and it's one that fans of the band's debut will be able to dig into for more of the emotion, aggression, and catharsis that brought them to Woe, Is Me in the first place." Harley Hughes of Hellhound Music also gave the album a positive review, praising the "In your face lyrics" and "...flowing melodious vocals that you'll find yourself singing along to."

== Track listing ==
No.	Title	Length
1.	"D-Day"	0:35
2.	"F.Y.I."	2:22
3.	"A Story to Tell"	3:37
4.	"With Our Friend[s] Behind Us" (featuring Caleb Shomo of Beartooth)	3:55
5.	"Nothing Left to Lose"	3:15
6.	"The Walking Dead" (featuring Matty Mullins of Memphis May Fire)	3:49
7.	"I Came, I Saw, I Conquered"	2:10
8.	"Call It Like You See It"	2:01
9.	"I've Told You Once"	4:13
10.	"Family First"	3:14
11.	"Nothing Left to Lose (Acoustic)" (featuring Cameron Mizell of Time Traveller)	2:06
Total length:		31:17

== Personnel ==
Woe, Is Me

- Doriano Magliano – screamed vocals
- Hance Alligood – clean vocals
- Andrew Paiano – lead guitar
- Kevin Hanson – rhythm guitar
- Brian Medley – bass guitar
- Austin Thornton – drums, programming, keyboards

Additional musicians

- Matty Mullins of Memphis May Fire – vocals on "The Walking Dead"
- Caleb Shomo of Beartooth – vocals on "With Our Friend[s] Behind Us"
- Cameron Mizell of Time Traveller – Nothing Left To Lose (Acoustic)

Production

- Cameron Mizell – production
