= Trust in Few =

Studio album by We Are Defiance
- Released: March 29, 2011
- Recorded: 2010 – March 2011 at Diamond Studios, Ocala, Florida
- Genre: Metalcore
- Length: 30:22
- Label: Tragic Hero
- Producer: Tom Denney

We Are Defiance chronology
Trust in Few	Live & Learn (shelved)

Singles from Trust in Few
- 1. "To the Moon" Released: September 5, 2009; 2. "I'm Gonna Bury You Underground, Eli" Released: February 14, 2011; 3. "The Weight of the Sea" Released: February 21, 2011

Trust in Few is the debut album of Ocala metalcore band We Are Defiance, released in March 2011.

== Background and recording ==
The band announced that Tyler Smith of The Word Alive and Danny Worsnop of Asking Alexandria would be featured on one track each. Smith was featured on the track "Not Another Song About You", though Worsnop was pulled off Trust in Few by his label Sumerian due to the fact the bands' records came out too close together.

The album was produced by ex-A Day to Remember guitarist Tom Denney, who also engineered, mixed and mastered the album at Diamond Studios in Ocala, Florida.

== Release ==
Originally set for release on March 15, the release was delayed after a car accident the band had while touring through the US at the beginning of 2011, when lead vocalist Brian Calzini was brought into the hospital.

"To the Moon", "I'm Gonna Bury You Underground Eli" and "Weight of the Sea" were all released as singles prior to the album's release, with a music video shot for "It's Not a Problem Unless You Make It One".

Trust in Few was released by Tragic Hero on March 29, 2011, and peaked at 28 on the Billboard Heatseekers.

== Track list ==
1. "Intro" – 2:01
2. "Welcome to the Sunshine State" – 2:03
3. "You're Killing Me Smalls!" – 3:14
4. "It's Not a Problem Unless You Make It One" – 3:00
5. "The Weight of the Sea" – 4:18
6. "To the Moon" – 2:52
7. "I'm Gonna Bury You Underground Eli" – 2:54
8. "So, Return to the King" – 4:05
9. "Not Another Song About You" – 2:49
  feat. Tyler Smith of The Word Alive
10. "Sincerity" – 3:36

== Personnel ==
We Are Defiance

- Brian Calzini – unclean vocals
- Jason Neil – clean vocals
- Andi Encinas – lead guitar
- Dean Dragonas – rhythm guitar
- Rik Stevely – bass guitar
- Josh Gowing – drums, percussion

Guest musicians

- Tyler Smith – additional vocals on "Not Another Song About You"

Production

- Tom Denney – mixing, mastering, production, engineering
- Aaron Marsh – cover artwork
- Brian Calzini – cover artwork
