= Secrets (post-hardcore band) =

American post-hardcore band

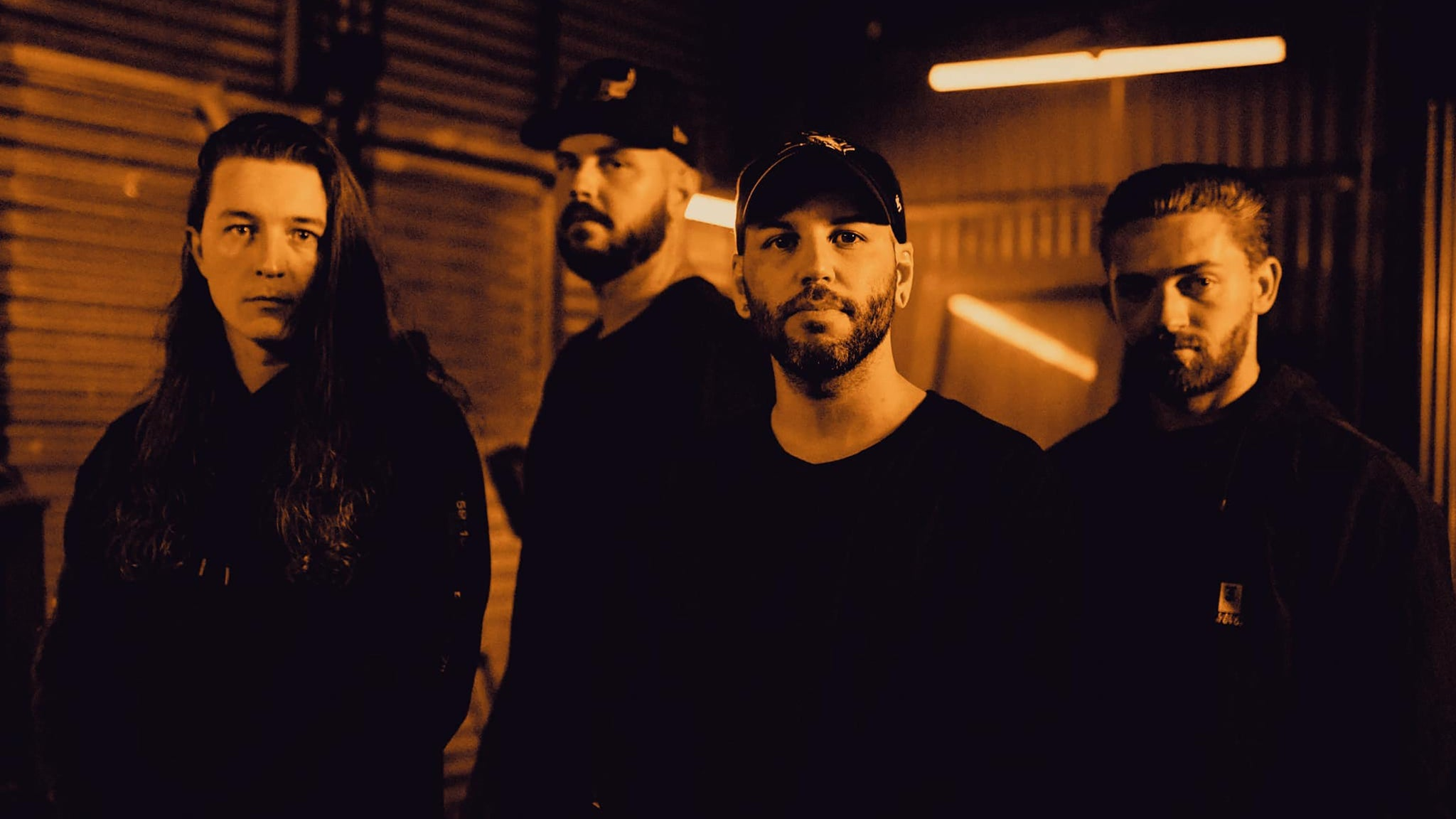

Background information
- Origin: San Diego, California, U.S.
- Genres: Metalcore; post-hardcore
- Years active: 2010–present
- Labels: Rise; Velocity
- Members: Wade Walters; Connor Branigan; Richard Rogers; Connor Allen
- Past members: Marc Koch; Xander Bourgeois; Michael Owens; Aaron Melzer; Joe English; Michael Sherman; Connor Allen; David Baqi; Rob McDonald
- Website: www.secretstour.com

Secrets (stylized as SECRETS) is an American metalcore band formed in San Diego, California, in 2010. After being signed to Rise Records in 2011, Secrets released their debut full-length album The Ascent in January 2012. The record debuted at No. 3 on the Billboard Heatseekers Chart and became the first Velocity Records release to appear on the Billboard Top 200, debuting at No. 185.

After going through lineup changes in 2013, the band released their second album Fragile Figures in July. The album was a success, selling over 10,000 copies in the first month and charting at No. 59 on the Billboard 200 chart.

== History ==
=== Formation and The Ascent (2010–2012) ===
Secrets was formed from the breakup of A City Serene after they were involved in a serious highway accident, which left two band members in comas. Band members Xander Bourgeois, Marc Koch, Joe English, and Michael Sherman reformed as Secrets in 2010 and added Richard Rogers as their clean vocalist and rhythm guitarist. The band was quickly signed to Velocity Records, an imprint of Rise Records. While their initial intention was to release an EP, the band opted to proceed with a full-length album title titled The Ascent in 2012 produced by Tom Denney, formerly of A Day to Remember.

Secrets toured extensively to promote the release of The Ascent with bands such as Sleeping With Sirens, Attack Attack!, and Escape The Fate. They were also part of the Scream It Like You Mean It tour in 2012. During the middle of the tour, bassist Marc Koch left the band to focus on his schoolwork full-time.

=== Fragile Figures (2013–2014) ===
On April 20, 2013, lead vocalist Xander Bourgeois announced that he would be leaving the band, expressing his decision to prioritize maintaining sobriety. Additionally, he announced that he would be working on a new band that he feels will only succeed in his sobriety. Bourgeois and Koch later formed a new band, The Haven, in early 2014.

On April 30, 2013, the band announced that their new vocalist would be Aaron Melzer, formerly of the local band Author and Finisher. Along with the vocalist announcement, the band shared a small clip of a new song off of their second album, which they recorded and released while on the Vans Warped Tour 2013.

On June 8, 2013, Secrets announced that Fragile Figures would be released on July 23, 2013. A new single, "Ready For Repair," was released alongside a music video on June 10. "Live Together, Die Alone" was released on June 25 as a promotional single. iTunes preorders for the new album went up on June 30. A new promotional single, "Maybe Next May", was released on July 5. On July 17, the album was released as an album stream on YouTube.

In January 2014, Secrets was announced to return on the Vans Warped Tour 2014 for a second time. The band premiered a music video for "Maybe Next May" on April 7, featuring video submissions from fans.

Bassist Michael Owens announced via a Tumblr blog post that he has left the band on May 12, 2014. Connor Branigan began touring as the bassist starting in 2014.

On May 15, 2014, the band posted a previously unreleased demo titled "Unreleased Song 2014" on YouTube. This track was later revealed to be included in the deluxe edition of Fragile Figures, featuring three new songs and a remix of "Ready for Repair" by Captain Midnite featuring Jonny Craig. The deluxe edition was officially released on May 27, 2014.

Secrets toured with Asking Alexandria, The Ghost Inside, and Crown the Empire on the Europe and UK From Death To Destiny Tour in October and November 2014. They also toured with Dance Gavin Dance, Alive Like Me, and Defeat the Low on the Rise Records Tour from November to December 2014.

=== Renditions EP and Everything That Got Us Here (2015–2016) ===
In mid-December, the band was announced as a supporting act for The Devil Wears Prada's upcoming Zombie 5 Tour, along with Born of Osiris and The Word Alive for the first leg of the tour and Sleepwave for the second leg.

The band played several single, headlining shows during early 2015. At the same time, they announced they had begun working on their third album. The band played at Self-Help Fest on March 7, 2015.

On March 19, 2015, the band announced they would release an acoustic EP, Renditions, on April 7, 2015. The EP includes three stripped-down songs from Fragile Figures as well as a new track, "What's Left of Us".

On October 3, 2015, the band announced on Facebook that Aaron Melzer would be leaving the band, and their new album was recorded with Wade Walters, who would join them on their upcoming tour.

The band released a new single, "Left Behind", on October 14, 2015, from their upcoming album Everything That Got Us Here. The album was released on December 11, 2015, with two release shows scheduled for December 11 and 12 in Southern California. The music video for the album's second single, "Rise Up", was premiered on Billboard.com on November 10.

On May 30, 2016, the band released a surprise new track, "Waste Away".

=== Secrets (2017–2019) ===
In May 2017, the band signed to Made in the Shade Records. On September 1, the band released a new single, "Incredible", along with its music video. Secrets was the supporting act for the Slaves US headline tour, The Beautiful Death Tour, through September and October 2017 with Picturesque and Out Came The Wolves.

They released another single titled "Five Years" on November 10, 2017, and an accompanying music video was released on December 8.

In addition, on December 8, 2017, the band announced that they will be releasing their album, Secrets, on February 23, 2018. Just before the album launch, Secrets released the music video for the song "Strangers" on February 16, 2018.

Tyre Outerbridge was the session drummer for the self-titled album cycle, playing on tour from 2016 to 2018.

On March 8, 2018, Secrets announced that lead guitarist Michael Sherman would depart the band for personal reasons after being with the band for 8 years, leaving Richard Rogers as the last member from the original lineup. Connor Branigan became the new lead guitarist.

On March 27, 2018, the music video for "Fourteen" was released, followed by "Sixteen" on May 4. The band then released a music video for "The End" on April 26, 2019, making it the sixth music video from the album and the first to feature drummer Connor Allen as a permanent member of the band.

=== Independent band (2019–2021) ===
Several singles were released between 2019 and 2021, including "My Mind, Myself & I", "Comedown", "Iron Hearted", and "Hold On". According to Richard Rogers, "My Mind, Myself & I" revolves around the topic of anxiety, fear, and panic. The official video for "Hold On" pays tribute to former unclean vocalist Aaron Melzer after dying in 2020. Originally, Secrets planned to release a full-length album in 2020 with these singles. However, after Melzer's death, they decided to record a new full-length album containing 10 songs with previous producer Tom Denney.

After being an independent band since 2019, Secrets announced their signing with San Diego label Velocity Records on February 4, 2021.

Through February and March in 2022, Secrets played on the Velocity Records Tour headlined by Scary Kids Scaring Kids and D.R.U.G.S. On tour, they played two new songs from the upcoming album The Collapse, "Parasite" and "The Collapse".

=== The Collapse (2022–2024) ===
Secrets released their fifth full-length album, The Collapse, on June 10, 2022, under Velocity Records. Comprising 12 tracks, the album ventures into a heavier metalcore territory compared to their previous works. It was produced by Tom Denney who originally worked on the first three studio albums with the band.

Exploring themes of anxiety, depression, addiction, loss, and hope, the album's lyrical content reflects experiences both prior to and during the pandemic. The singles "Parasite", "The Collapse", "Falling Out", and "Get Outta My Head" preceded the album release. The closing track, "Fade Away", delves into the theme of losing a loved one and serves as a heartfelt tribute to Aaron Melzer.

=== Departure of Rogers, lineup instability, and upcoming album (2024–present) ===
On March 22, 2024, Secrets announced their North America Tour with special guests Colorblind, Glasslands, and Unwell in April and May 2024. They also announced that they were supporting Eyes Set to Kill on the Into The Wilderness with 15 Years of Reach Tour in June and July 2024.

On April 27, 2024, Secrets announced that their clean vocalist and guitarist, Richard Rogers, would be departing from the band. Alongside this news, the band introduced David Baqi, known for his work with Being As An Ocean and Takers Leavers, as the new clean vocalist. Additionally, Secrets unveiled their upcoming single, "Despair," on May 10, 2024, along with plans for a forthcoming album produced by Taylor Larson. The promotional materials also introduced Rob McDonald as the band's new drummer. Following these announcements, the band continued their North America Tour with the new vocalist and drummer.

On November 5, 2024, Secrets announced their 4 final shows with Richard Rogers in December, all taking place in California, as a farewell to Richard.

=== Return of Rogers and Searching for the Things We Don't Wish to Find (2025–present) ===
On October 3, 2025, Secrets announced the return of vocalist and rhythm guitarist Richard Rogers and drummer Connor Allen, alongside the release of a new single, "Paralyzed". The song was inspired by Rogers' personal experience following the end of a nine-year relationship with his fiancée. Walters, who had seen Rogers take a break from the band for about a year, encouraged his return to the studio. The song was produced by Connor Branigan and Wade Walters, with mixing and mastering handled by Matt Thomas. In the same announcement, the band announced that they had signed with SBG Records.

On December 15, 2025, Secrets released "The Dark".

The band went on a "Back from This" California tour from December 17 to December 20, 2025, with special guests Twin Cities, Differences, and Better Hell.

On April 24, 2026, Secrets released "The Wheel" and announced their forthcoming 11-track album, Searching for the Things We Don't Wish to Find, scheduled for release on July 3, 2026.

On May 15, 2026, Secrets released "Peripheral Failure".

On June 12, 2026, Secrets released "Bitter Dose". The band also officially announced that Searching for the Things We Don't Wish to Find had been delayed to September 18th, 2026.

On July 24, 2026, Secrets released "Where The Light Doesn't Reach".

On August 28, 2026, Secrets released "Silent Strain".

Secrets officially released the album Searching for the Things We Don't Find on September 18, 2026.

== Band members ==
Current members

- Wade Walters – unclean vocals (2015–present), rhythm guitar (2019–present), bass (2015–2019)
- Connor Branigan – lead guitar (2018–present), bass (2016–2018, 2019–present; touring 2014–2016), rhythm guitar (2016–2018; touring 2015–2016)
- Richard Rogers – clean vocals, rhythm guitar (2010–2024, 2025–present)
- Connor Allen – drums (2019–2024, 2025–present)

Former members

- Marc Koch – bass (2010–2012), clean vocals (2010)
- Xander Bourgeois – unclean vocals (2010–2013)
- Michael Owens – bass (2012–2014)
- Aaron Melzer – unclean vocals (2013–2015; died 2020)
- Joe English – drums, percussion (2010–2016)
- Michael Sherman – lead guitar (2010–2018), rhythm guitar (2010)
- David Baqi – clean vocals, rhythm guitar (2024–2025)
- Rob McDonald – drums (2024–2025)

Former touring musicians

- Tim Trad – bass (2014)
- Tyre Outerbridge – drums, percussion (2016–2018)

== Discography ==
=== Studio albums ===
Year	Album	Labels	Chart positions		
Year	Album	Labels	US	US Indie	US Heat
2012	The Ascent	Rise Records	185	—	3
2013	Fragile Figures	Rise Records	59	13	—
2015	Everything That Got Us Here	Rise Records	—	20	—
2018	Secrets	Made in the Shade (MITS)	—	44	—
2022	The Collapse	Velocity Records	—	—	—
2026	Searching for the Things We Don't Wish to Find	SBG Records	—	—	—
"—" denotes a recording that did not chart or was not released in that territory.

=== EPs ===
- Renditions (2015)

=== Singles ===
Year	Song	Album
2011	"The Heartless Part"	The Ascent
2012	"The Oath"	The Ascent
2012	"Somewhere In Hiding"	The Ascent
2012	"Blindside"	The Ascent
2012	"Ass Back Home" (Gym Class Heroes cover)	Punk Goes Pop Volume 5
2013	"Ready For Repair"	Fragile Figures
2013	"Live Together, Die Alone"	Fragile Figures
2013	"Maybe Next May"	Fragile Figures
2015	"What's Left Of Us"	Renditions
2015	"Left Behind"	Everything That Got Us Here
2015	"Rise Up"	Everything That Got Us Here
2016	"Waste Away"	
2017	"Shape of You" (Ed Sheeran cover)	
2017	"Incredible"	Secrets
2017	"Five Years"	Secrets
2018	"3.17.16"	Secrets
2018	"Strangers"	Secrets
2019	"My Mind, Myself & I"	
2020	"Comedown"	
2020	"Iron Hearted"	
2021	"Hold On"	
2022	"Parasite"	The Collapse
2022	"The Collapse"	The Collapse
2022	"Falling Out"	The Collapse
2022	"Get Outta My Head"	The Collapse
2024	"Despair"	Non-album single

=== Music videos ===
Year	Song	Album	Director
2012	"Somewhere In Hiding"	The Ascent	
2012	"The Oath"	The Ascent	
2012	"Blindside"	The Ascent	
2013	"Ready For Repair"	Fragile Figures	
2013	"Live Together, Die Alone"	Fragile Figures	
2013	"How We Survive"	Fragile Figures	
2014	"Maybe Next May"	Fragile Figures	
2014	"Dance of the Dead"	Fragile Figures	
2015	"Rise Up"	Everything That Got Us Here	
2017	"Shape of You" (Ed Sheeran cover)		
2017	"Incredible"	Secrets	Jakob Owens
2017	"Five Years"	Secrets	Mathis Arnell
2018	"3.17.16"	Secrets	Thomas Helvenstine
2018	"Strangers"	Secrets	Thomas Helvenstine
2018	"Fourteen"	Secrets	Thomas Helvenstine
2018	"Sixteen"	Secrets	Thomas Helvenstine
2019	"The End"	Secrets	
2019	"My Mind, Myself & I"		Thomas Helvenstine
2020	"Comedown"		Thomas Helvenstine
2020	"Iron Hearted"		
2021	"Hold On"		
2022	"Parasite"	The Collapse	Thomas Helvenstine
2022	"The Collapse"	The Collapse	
2022	"Falling Out"	The Collapse	
2022	"Get Outta My Head"	The Collapse	Thomas Helvenstine
