= Fragile Figures =

Studio album by Secrets
- Released: July 23, 2013
- Recorded: 2012–2013
- Genres: Post-hardcore, metalcore
- Length: 37:03
- Labels: Velocity; Rise
- Producer: Tom Denney

Secrets chronology
The Ascent (2012)	Fragile Figures (2013)	Renditions (2015)

Singles from Fragile Figures
- 1. "Ready for Repair" Released: June 10, 2013; 2. "Live Together, Die Alone" Released: June 25, 2013; 3. "Maybe Next May" Released: July 5, 2013; 4. "The Architect (Part Two)" Released: July 12, 2013

Alternative cover
- Deluxe Edition cover

Fragile Figures is the second studio album by American post-hardcore band Secrets released through Velocity and Rise Records on July 23, 2013. It is the band's second album produced by Tom Denney, and the first and only release with vocalist Aaron Melzer. The album sold over 10,000 copies on its first month, and reached number 59 on Billboard 200 chart in 2013. The deluxe edition of the album was released on May 27, 2014, with 3 new songs and a remix of the track "Ready for Repair". It is the only release to include former vocalist Aaron Melzer before his departure in 2015 and death in 2020.

== Background ==
The band teamed up again with producer Tom Denney (ex-A Day to Remember) who produced their debut album The Ascent. Vocally, the sound was going to be different from the previous album, as the former vocalist Xander Bourgeois who sang on the debut album, left in April and was replaced with a new lead vocalist Aaron Melzer, formerly with the band Author & Finisher. Also Richard Rogers worked on his vocals for this album with Eric Ron who is specialized in vocal production.

== Promotion ==
The debut single from the album, "Ready for Repair", along with a music video, was released on June 10, 2013. The single was available only as instant download with the album pre-order bundle. The second song from the album "Live Together, Die Alone" premiered on June 25. A lyric video was released for this promotional track. The third single, "Maybe Next May" was released as digital download on July 5. The fourth and final song presented before the album release was "The Architect (Part Two)" which premiered exclusively at Revolver Magazine website on July 12. The new album Fragile Figures was released in its entirety for streaming on a YouTube playlist on July 17. A music video for "How We Survive" premiered exclusively at Alternative Press website on December 12, 2013. The band then released a music video featuring fan-submitted videos for "Maybe Next May" on April 7, 2014.

== Reception ==
Professional ratings
Review scores
Source	Rating
AbsolutePunk	80%
Allmusic	3.5/5 stars
Highlight Magazine	8/10
HM	3.5/5 stars
New Noise	3/5 stars
Rockfreaks.net	7.5/10
StarPulse	B+

The album received generally favorable reviews from music critics. The vocals delivered by guitarist/singer Richard Rogers and the new vocalist Aaron Melzer are considered the highlight of the album by many critics. David Jeffries comments the vocalist change in his AllMusic review that "there's little doubt that San Diego post-hardcore group Secrets are quite different on their sophomore release, but there's still that same angst and anger driving the lyrics, and the band are as tight as ever." Brian Campbell for Starpulse writes that "Secrets' vocal dynamic has never sounded this crisp, this exciting", and thanks the vocal interplay between the singers for it. Sarah Brehm of HM Magazine opines that the band shines with "Melzer's exceptional screams mixed with both gang and clean vocals". Lærke Fenger in her Rockfreaks review compares the clean punk rock vocals and metalcore breakdowns to the debut album "The Ascent", and states that while the vocal parts didn't seem to integrate on the previous album, the flow is much better on "Fragile Figures". She also maintains that Melzer's vocal quality of growling more often than screaming fits the general song structures well.

However, Nathaniel Lay of New Noise is more critical about the change to the new screamer's mostly grumbling vocal style, and claims it "takes quite a while to 'get used to'". He also states that Rogers' "work is still strong, and really helps fuel the songs", but "his parts aren't as catchy or memorable as they were during The Ascent". Also Lærke Fenger complains that "most of the songs on this album blend together in my mind" as they are "so similar in sound and structure". She singles out the album closer "Sleep Well, Darling" as the only stand-out from the album, and claims that the memorable parts of the album are "just Rogers' catchy melodies especially on "Live Together, Die Alone" and "Infinite Escape"".

Brian Campbell notes that the band are sonically expanding their horizons on album standouts "The Architect, Part Two" where Melzer handles majority of vocals, and "Sleep Well, Darling" which "showcases a new side to Secrets" and is "the strongest track Secrets has set to wax yet". Also Sarah Brehm comments the final track "Sleep Well, Darling" noting that "while not bad on its own – it doesn't seem to fit the rest of the album".

== Track listing ==
No.	Title	Length
1.	"How We Survive"	3:14
2.	"Ready for Repair"	3:16
3.	"Forever and Never"	3:29
4.	"Artist Vs. Who?"	3:29
5.	"Wasted Youth, Pt. 1"	3:14
6.	"The Architect, Pt. 2"	3:05
7.	"Maybe Next May"	3:04
8.	"Fragile Figures"	3:20
9.	"Live Together, Die Alone"	3:25
10.	"Infinite Escape"	3:38
11.	"Sleep Well, Darling"	3:49
Total length:		37:03

Deluxe Edition
No.	Title	Length
1.	"Dance of the Dead"	4:05
2.	"Heartbreak Kids"	3:45
3.	"The Wild"	4:07
4.	"How We Survive"	3:14
5.	"Ready for Repair"	3:16
6.	"Forever and Never"	3:29
7.	"Artist Vs. Who?"	3:29
8.	"Wasted Youth, Pt. 1"	3:14
9.	"The Architect, Pt. 2"	3:05
10.	"Maybe Next May"	3:04
11.	"Fragile Figures"	3:20
12.	"Live Together, Die Alone"	3:25
13.	"Infinite Escape"	3:38
14.	"Sleep Well, Darling"	3:49
15.	"Ready for Repair (Captain Midnite Remix)" (featuring Kyle Lucas & Jonny Craig)	4:07
Total length:		53:07

== Personnel ==
Secrets

- Aaron Melzer – unclean vocals, clean vocals "The Architect, Pt. 2"
- Richard Rogers – rhythm guitar, clean vocals
- Michael Sherman – lead guitar
- Michael Owens – bass
- Joe English – drums

Additional personnel

- Adrian Alvarado – engineer
- Jonny Craig – vocals on "Ready for Repair (Captain Midnite Remix)"
- Kyle Lucas – vocals on "Ready for Repair (Captain Midnite Remix)"
- Matt Burke – photography
- Tom Denney – engineer, mixing, producer
- Alan Douches – mastering
- Kayleigh Kirkpatrick – model
- Stephen Marro – additional production, engineer
- Aaron Marsh – artwork
- Matt Louis – music composition and production
- Erik Ron – engineer, vocal producer

== Charts ==
Chart (2013)	Peak Position
U.S. Billboard 200	59
U.S. Top Hard Rock Albums	6
U.S. Independent Albums	13
U.S. Top Rock Albums	18
