= For the Fallen Dreams =

American metalcore band

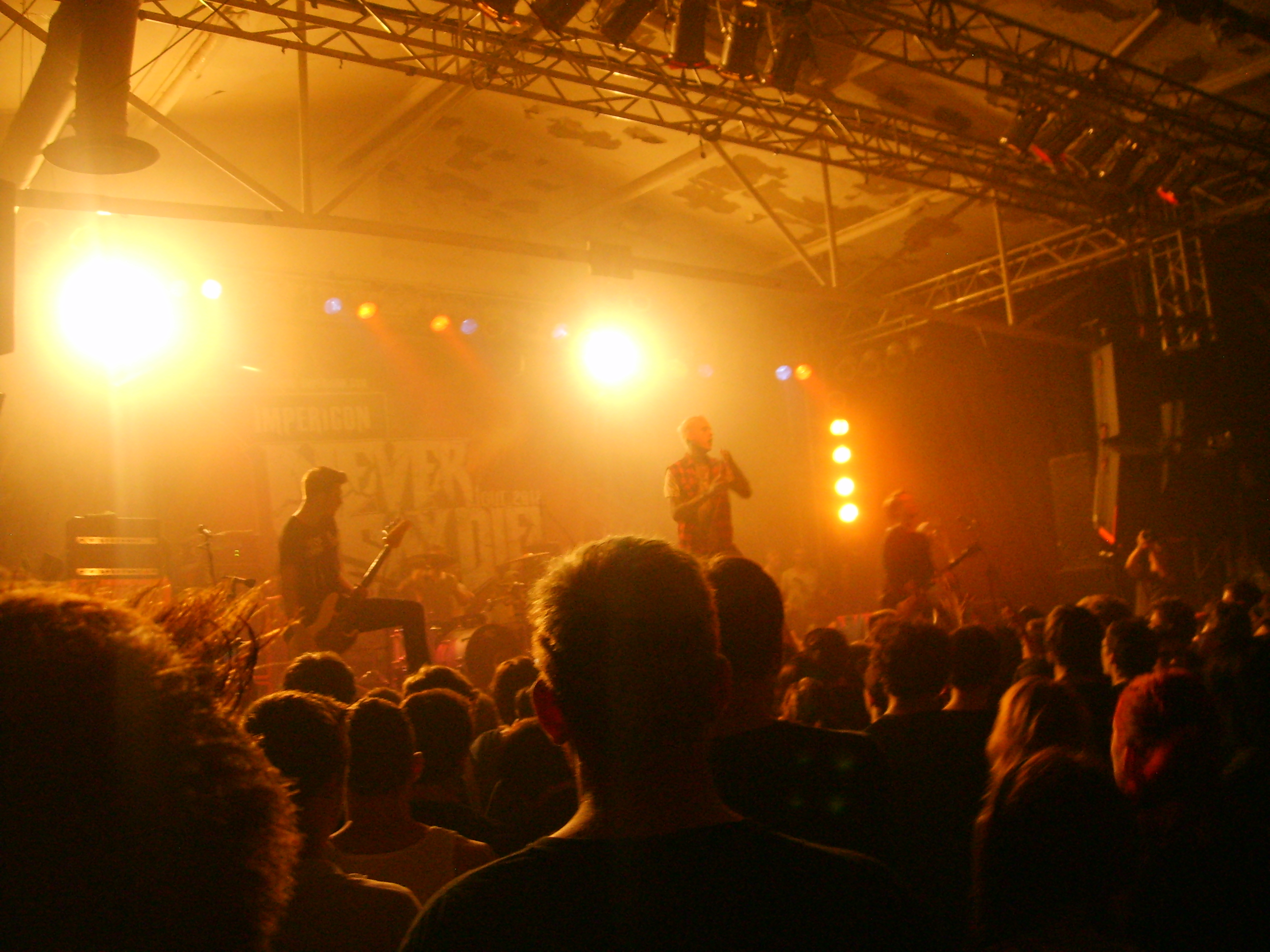
- For the Fallen Dreams performing in 2012

Background information
- Origin: Lansing, Michigan, U.S.
- Genres: Srscore, metalcore, melodic hardcore
- Years active: 2003–present
- Labels: Artery; Rise; Arising Empire
- Members: Jim Hocking; Chad Ruhlig; Eric Woolard
- Past members: See Members

For the Fallen Dreams is an American metalcore band from Lansing, Michigan, formed in 2003. The band originally signed to Rise Records but produced one album under Artery Recordings in 2012. After the departure of then vocalist Dylan Richter and the return of vocalist Chad Ruhlig in 2013, the band started producing music under Rise Records once again until 2022.

They have released three demos (their first being in the genre of deathcore), a self-titled extended play, and seven full-length albums: Changes (2008), Relentless (2009), Back Burner (2011), Wasted Youth (2012), Heavy Hearts (2014), Six (2018) and For the Fallen Dreams (2023). Relentless charted at number 29 on the Billboard Top Heatseekers.

== History ==
=== Formation and early years (2003–2006) ===
Jim Hocking (lead guitar), Andrew Tkaczyk (drums), Aaron Long (vocals), Chris Croll (rhythm guitar) and Chris Ash (bass) formed For the Fallen Dreams in 2003. While Long, Croll and Ash only had brief stays in the band Hocking and Tkaczyk watched members come and go (including Chad Ruhlig on bass) for the first two years of the band's existence; altogether amounting to 10 members.

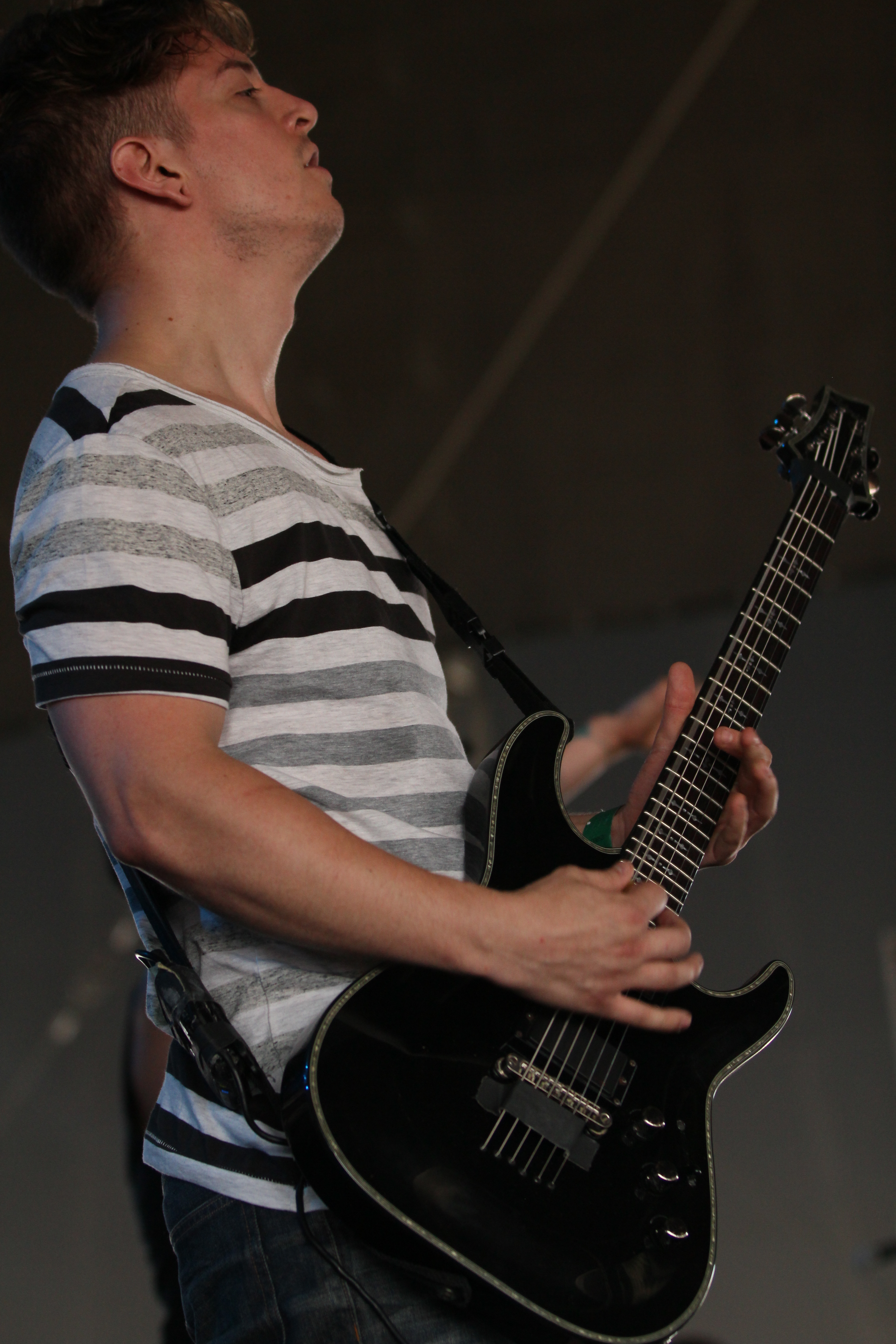
Jim Hocking

=== Changes and Ruhlig's departure (2007–2009) ===
In early 2006, the band added Chad Ruhlig as vocalist and produced the album Changes which was released in 2008 after members Marcus Morgan (rhythm guitar) and Scott Green (bass) had also left the band.

On January 8, 2008, the band released its first full-length studio album called Changes.

In January, FTFD and Cassius, a band signed to Lifeforce Records, planned a tour visiting seventeen states, starting and ending in Michigan.

FTFD performed at The Modern Exchange in Southgate, Michigan on July 30, 2008, with bands I Am Abomination and A Day to Remember.

=== Richter's arrival, Relentless and Ellis' departure (2009–2010) ===
Chad Ruhlig departed For the Fallen Dreams in 2008, the same year that they released their highly acclaimed album Changes. Ruhlig stated that the departure was mutual and that he and the band both wished the best for each other After Ruhlig's departure the band quickly welcomed Dylan Richter as the new lead vocalist.Hardcore News & Metal News Dylan Richter fronted the band From Under the Gallows previous to FTFD.

On July 21, 2009, the album Relentless was released. It charted at number 29 on the Billboard Top Heatseekers list.

Vocalist Jeremy McKinnon from A Day to Remember was featured on the song "Nightmares".

FTFD toured with A Day to Remember and Azriel in the UK and Germany 2009 Tour in February and March 2009.

The Thrash & Burn tour in August 2009 included FTFD as well as Devildriver, Emmure, MyChildren MyBride, Veil of Maya, Oceano, Periphery, and more.

They performed with Azriel and Confession at The Cockpit in Leeds, UK in March 2010.

2009 saw the departure Chris Cain on rhythm guitar and the arrival of Kalan Blehm. In 2010, bassist Joe Ellis, member since 2007, also left the band, leaving a spot that would be filled and vacated by two members in the same year.

=== Tkaczyk's departure, Back Burner and Stastny's arrival (2011–2012) ===
On May 24, 2011, For the Fallen Dreams released the album Back Burner. The band produced two music videos to the songs "The Big Empty" and "Let Go".

On March and April 2011, For the Fallen Dreams performed at the Sick Tour with Chelsea Grin, Attila, Chunk! No Captain Chunk!, and Vanna with Volumes and The Crimson Armada on select dates.

In 2011, founding member Andrew Tkaczyk departed the band and joined The Ghost Inside. Tkaczyk would remain completely removed from the band until 2013 when Chad Ruhlig returned. After Ruhlig's return Tkaczyk rejoined FTFDs efforts, contributing to composition and songwriting. Jordan McPherson, bassist and backing vocalist, and Arvan Sarathy, drums/percussion, also joined and departed the band in 2011.

=== Wasted Youth and Blehm's departure (2012–2013) ===
On July 17, 2012, Wasted Youth was released.

One month prior to the release, the music video for the song "Resolvent Feelings" was released. "Resolvent Feelings" was the only song on the album had a music video.

FTFD was on the bill for the 14th annual Metal and Hardcore Festival in Worcester, Massachusetts in April. The bill had 77 bands over 3 days. FTFD played on the third day on the same stage as Killswitch Engage, Vanna, Every Time I Die, For Today, Chelsea Grin, Stick to Your Guns, Attila, MyChildren MyBride, Texas in July, Betraying the Martyrs, Like Moths to Flames, Volumes, Hundredth, No Bragging Rights, The Air I Breathe and others.

The band attended the Slam Dunk South Festival in Hatfield, England in May, playing alongside Taking Back Sunday, Motion City Soundtrack, Architects, Mayday Parade, Cancer Bats, Every Time I Die, Lower Than Atlantis, Funeral for a Friend, Upon a Burning Body, Of Mice & Men, I See Stars, and more.

FTFD performed at the Skate and Surf Festival in Jackson, New Jersey in May. Bands on the roster included A Day to Remember, Gideon, Breathe Carolina, Crown the Empire, Escape the Fate, Of Mice & Men, Dangerkids, For All Those Sleeping, Issues, Miss May I, Hundredth, and more.

In August 2012, they joined the All Star tour which included bands Suicide Silence, The Word Alive, I See Stars, A Skylit Drive, Winds of Plague, Stick to Your Guns, Attila, Stray from the Path, Make Me Famous, Betraying the Martyrs, Obey the Brave, Ice Nine Kills, and Dance Gavin Dance plus Unearth on select dates.

In 2013, Kalan Blehm departed For the Fallen Dreams and joined Attila as their new bassist and backing vocalist. Blehm was the last full-time rhythm guitarist on the band's roster. Dylan Shippey joined FTFD as the new percussionist, filling the spot that Arvan Sarathy vacated in late 2011.

=== Richter's departure and Ruhlig's return (2013–2014) ===
In 2013, Richter decided to part ways with For the Fallen Dreams after acting as vocalist for the three full-length albums Relentless (2009), Back Burner (2011), and Wasted Youth (2012). Richter cited his need for change and prioritizing and that home-life was the reason for departing For the Fallen Dreams.

Being aware of Richter's eventual departure For the Fallen Dreams contacted Chad Ruhlig to see if he would be interested in returning. In an interview on the May 23, 2013, Ruhlig stated that his return seemed like a logical choice because of his relationship to the band and the band's need to stay genuine to their sound. Ruhlig also stated that he was impressed by Richter's work on Relentless and Back Burner and that despite his absence those albums were true to For the Fallen Dreams musical style.

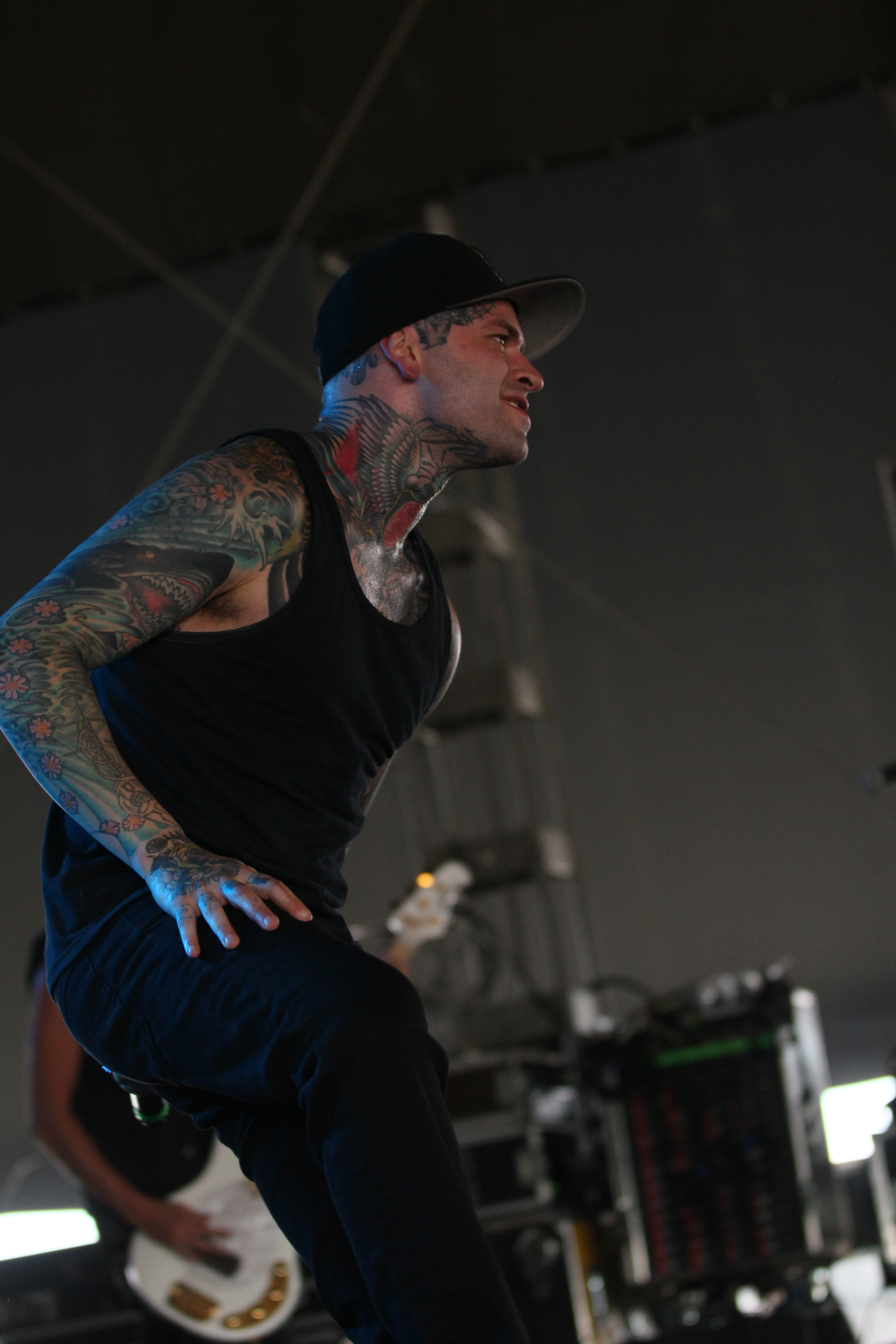
Chad Ruhlig

Wasted Youth had been released not even six months prior to Dylan Richter's departure and the band had no intention of letting the loss of a member slow their progress, after all For the Fallen Dreams history was rife with transient members.

FTFD planned on attending the Boys of Summer tour in Australia in January 2013 but cancelled due to unforeseen circumstances.

The single "Substance" was released in May 2013. The single marked Ruhlig's return and showed fans the style of music they should anticipate for their next album.

In April, while performing tour dates with Abandon All Ships and Dream on Dreamer in Europe and the UK, the band announced their own headlining tour which included 27 dates between May and June. Upon This Dawning, Hundredth, Gideon, To the Wind, and Wolves at the Gate had also signed onto the tour.

FTFD announced that they would be returning to Australia in September 2013 to attend tour dates with The Plot in You, Storm the Sky, and Fit for a King. They had to cancel due to injuries that Ruhlig sustained from a motorbike accident. Ruhlig needed a wheelchair for at least two months and was told that he might need surgery on his leg.

In the months of October and November, FTFD acted as support for Senses Fail's headlining tour. The band had started playing singles from their next album Heavy Hearts at this time gearing up fans in preparation for its release in 2014.

Late in 2013, percussionist Dylan Shippey departed For the Fallen Dreams and Navid Naghdi joined to fill Shippey's place.

=== Heavy Hearts and Naghdi's departure (2014–2017) ===
The album Heavy Hearts was released on April 4, 2014, and is the fifth studio album the band has produced.

It was reported on September 8, 2014, by AltPress that the band had released a music video for the song "Bombay".

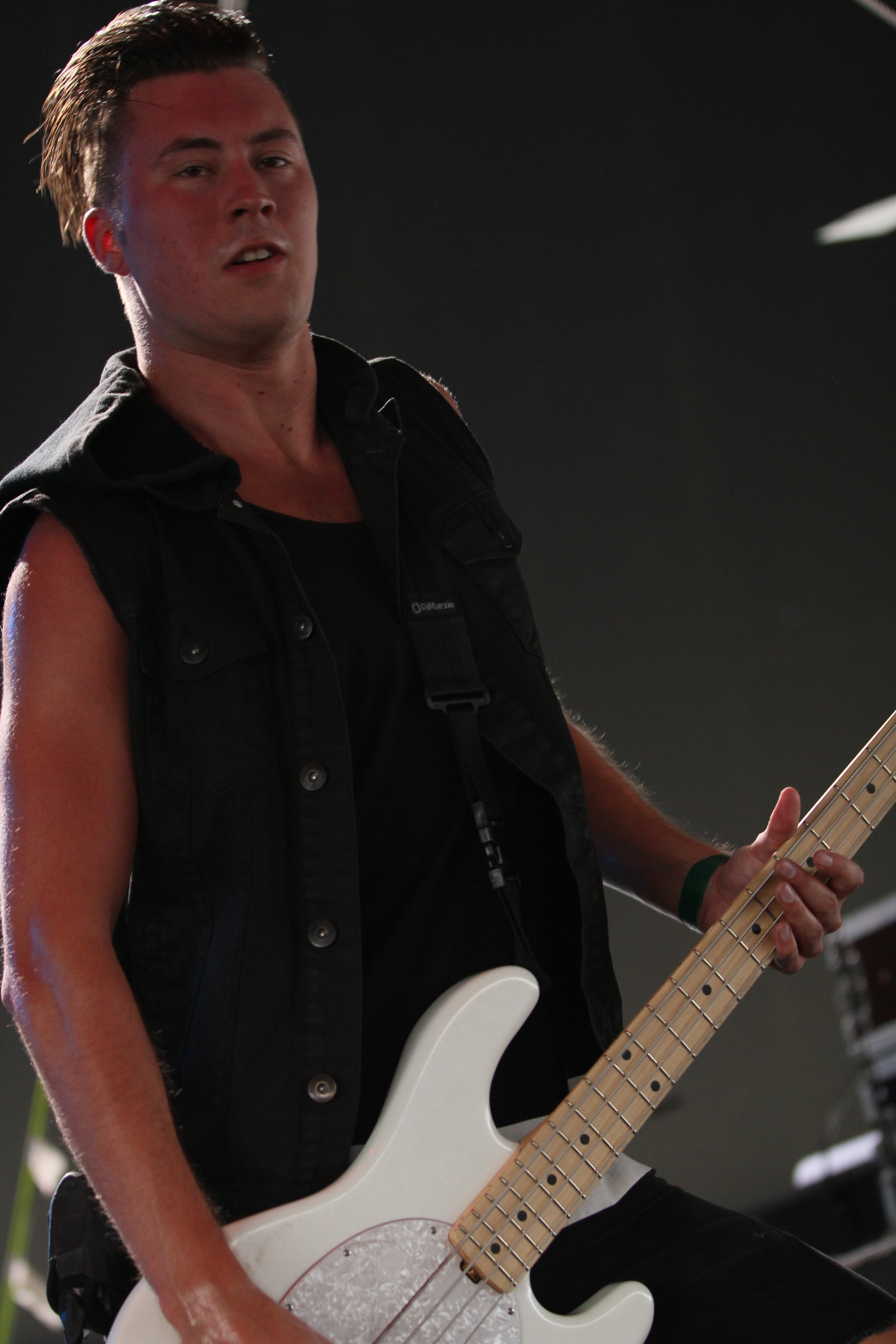
Brandon Stastny

On June 5, 2014, the band performed with Obey the Brave, I the Breather, Sylar, and Reflections at The Masquerade in Atlanta, Georgia, July 17, 2014, the band visited Camden, London and performed at The Underworld, and For the Fallen Dreams headlined on The Amity Affliction's Don't Lean On Me Tour and the Let the Ocean Take Me Tour from September to October 2014.

On March 15, 2015, For the Fallen Dreams performed with Norma Jean, Silent Planet, and Sirens and Sailors.

On August 13, 2016, they performed with Bury Your Dead, Hatebreed, Walls of Jericho, Attila, and Born of Osiris at The Crofoot Parking Lot in Pontiac, Michigan.

In 2017, the band joined the Southbound Tour with Silverstein and The Word Alive and performed twice at The Wire in Berwyn, Illinois, once with Famous Last Words.

In 2015, Shed my Skin interviewed Chad and Jim wherein they recalled how a truck had smashed into their trailer on tour a year earlier. Jim recollects climbing out of the van after being awoken by the accident to Chad telling him that a truck had hit the trailer and was stuck inside of it. To Jim's surprise Chad wasn't exaggerating, the truck had wedged itself all the way inside the band's 7' by 14' trailer. Luckily a bass drum, a lot of merchandise, and miscellaneous things were the only losses from the accident. In the same interview Jim and Chad described how every band experiences hiccups like theft and road accidents, and that they were hopeful that this accident would be the last mishap for at least six months. In the same year as this interview former member and current songwriter of FTFD Andrew Tkaczyk and other members of The Ghost Inside were also involved in a road incident in their touring van. Tkaczyk lost his right leg as a result of the accident.

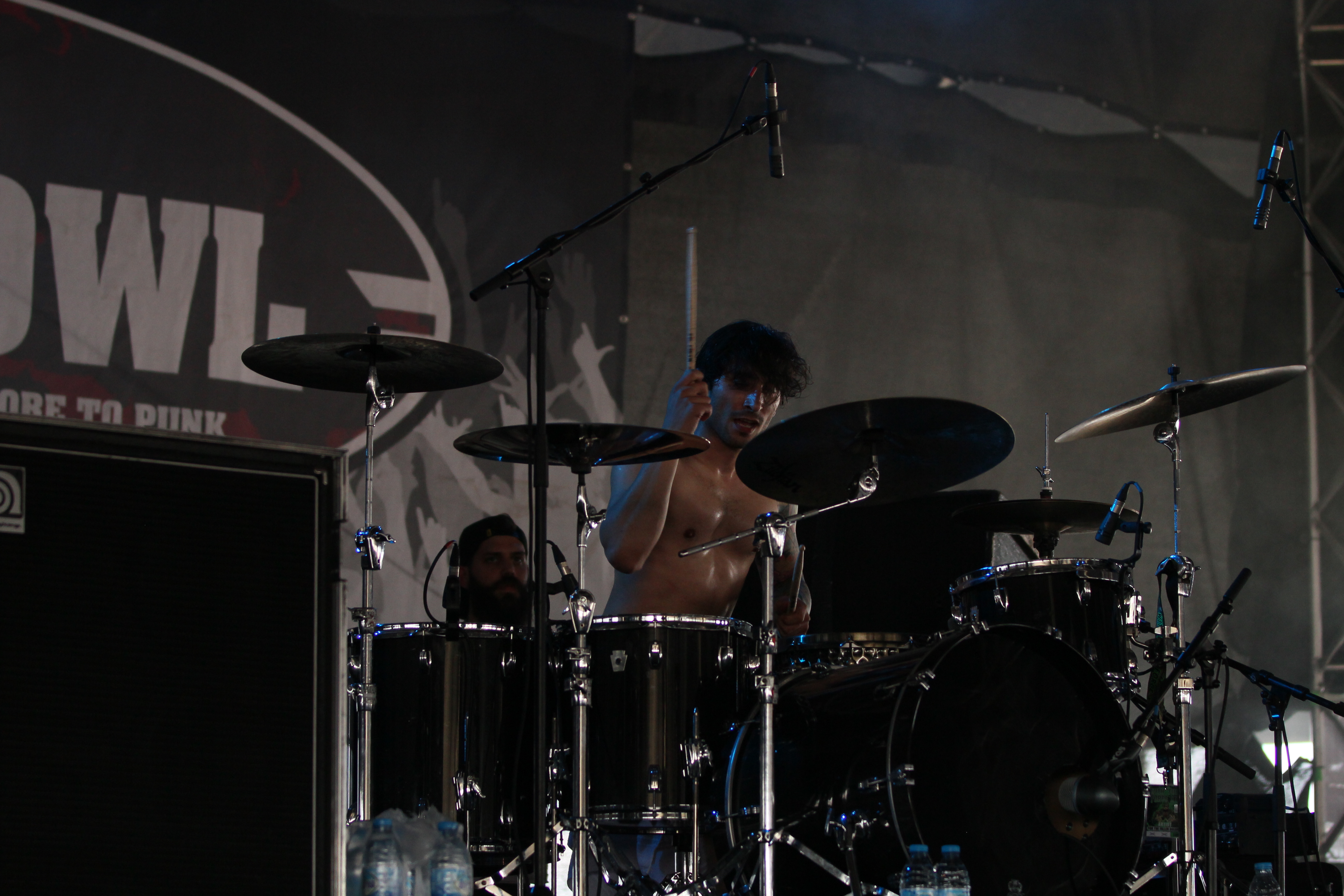
Navid Naghdi

=== Six and Stastny's departure (2018–2020) ===
On January 12, 2018, Rise Records published the music video for the song "Stone" on YouTube. The song is off of the upcoming album.

Six was released on February 16, 2018. Some tracks, like "Forever", are likened to a gritty version of Deftones or Breaking Benjamin.

On March 14, 2018, the music video for "Unstoppable" off of Six was debuted. Bassist Brandon Stastny shot and edited the video. In a brief interview the band told of how the video was shot in their home-state of Michigan a few hundred yards off the coastline on the Lake Michigan shelf ice formations which occur every winter. The day the video was shot was the only clear and sunny day during that month so it couldn't have been more perfect, they explained.

=== Blehm's return, new label and self-titled seventh album (2021–present) ===
On February 19, 2021, the band confirmed that they had begun recording their seventh album. On June 17, 2022, the band revealed that they had parted ways with Rise Records and signed with Arising Empire. On June 21, following a series of teasers released on various social media, the band unveiled the first single entitled "What If" along with a music video. On August 5, the band released the second single titled "Sulfate".

On September 6, the band published the third single "Re-Animate" and its corresponding music video. On October 20, the band released the fourth single "No Heaven" and an accompanying music video. On January 19, 2023, the band premiered the fifth single "Last One Out" with a music video. At the same time, they officially announced that their self-titled seventh studio album would be released on March 10, 2023 while also revealed the album cover and the track list. The music video for "Without You" was released March 10, 2023, coinciding with the album release.

== Artistry ==
=== Musical style and progression ===
Other bands that have a similar sound to For the Fallen Dreams include: A Day to Remember, The Ghost Inside, In Hearts Wake, Fit for a King, A Call to Sincerity, and Buried in Verona.

They have cited influences including Comeback Kid, Figure Four, Misery Signals, 7 Angels 7 Plagues, Underoath, As I Lay Dying, Killswitch Engage, Unearth, Dead to Fall, Bleeding Through, Martyr A.D., Bury Your Dead, Terror, First Blood, Since The Flood, Between the Buried and Me, From A Second Story Window, the Black Dahlia Murder, the Acacia Strain and Skinless.

=== Composition and lyrical content ===
Composition Jim Hocking is the only founding member of For the Fallen Dreams that remains on the line-up. Andrew Tkaczyk was the main songwriter up until he left the band in 2011 and joined The Ghost Inside; contributing to Changes (2008) and Relentless (2009). FTFD's signature sound was the making of Tkaczyk but their steady musical style over their history is the product of Hocking's tenure. Tkaczyk completely separated from the band in 2011 but returned to the songwriting front when original vocalist Chad Ruhlig returned in 2013. The Heavy Hearts album featured the song "Emerald Blue" which was partially composed by Tkaczyk.

After Tkacyk's departure, Hocking and Richter worked together on the albums Back Burner (2011) and Wasted Youth (2012).

Lyrical content For the Fallen Dreams lyrical content has been consistent over its history. The lyrical content of both the Richter and Ruhlig eras express the human condition, disposition towards others, instability, intense feelings, finding strength, and loss of faith in humanity.

== Members ==
=== Current members ===
- Jim Hocking – lead guitar (2003–present), clean vocals (2013–present), rhythm guitar (2013–2022), bass (2023–present), drums (2024–present)
- Chad Ruhlig – unclean vocals (2006–2008, 2013–present), clean vocals (2018–present), bass (2005)
- Eric Woolard – rhythm guitar, bass (2023–present)
- Joe Ellis – bass, backing vocals (2007–2010, 2026-present)
- Ryan Schuman - drums (2026-present)

Past members

- Aaron Long – unclean vocals (2003–2004)
- Andrew Juhl – unclean vocals (2004–2006)
- Dylan Richter – lead vocals (2008–2013)
- Chris Kroll – rhythm guitar (2003–2004)
- Josh Dore – rhythm guitar (2005–2006)
- Marcus Morgan – rhythm guitar (2006–2007)
- Jason Spencer – rhythm guitar (2007–2008)
- Chris Cain – rhythm guitar (2008–2009)
- Kalan Blehm – rhythm guitar, backing vocals (2010–2013), bass (2022–2023)
- Damon Tate – rhythm guitar (2021–2024)
- Josh Misch – bass (2003–2004)
- Pat Hahn – bass (2004–2005)
- Andrew Beal – bass (2005–2006)
- Scott Green – bass (2006–2007)
- Jaime Cano – bass, backing vocals (2010–2011)
- Jordan McPherson – bass (2011–2012)
- Brandon Stastny – bass (2012–2018)
- Andrew Tkaczyk – drums (2003–2011)
- Arvin Sarathy – drums (2011–2012)
- Will Weatherly – drums (2011)
- Dylan Shippey – drums (2012–2013)
- Navid Naghdi – drums (2013–2016)
- Marc Esses – drums (2017–2024)

== Discography ==
=== Studio albums ===
Title	Album details	Peak chart positions				
Title	Album details	US	US Heat.	US Indie.	US Rock	US Hard Rock
Changes	Released: January 8, 2008; Label: Rise; Format: CD, digital download	—	—	—	—	—
Relentless	Released: July 21, 2009; Label: Rise; Format: CD, digital download	—	29	—	—	—
Back Burner	Released: May 24, 2011; Label: Rise; Format: CD, digital download	187	4	28	46	10
Wasted Youth	Released: July 17, 2012; Label: Artery; Format: CD, digital download	176	6	31	—	16
Heavy Hearts	Released: April 4, 2014; Label: Rise; Format: CD, digital download, vinyl	162	3	27	33	12
Six	Released: February 16, 2018; Label: Rise; Format: CD, digital download	—	—	—	—	—
For the Fallen Dreams	Released: March 10, 2023; Label: Arising Empire; Format: CD, digital download	—	—	—	—	—

=== EPs ===
Year	Title	Label
2004	Dead as the Rest (Demo)	Self-released
2005	For the Fallen Dreams (Demo)	Self-released
2007	New Beginnings	Self-released

=== Singles ===
Title	Album	Year	Month	Label
"My Anthem-Like Symphony"	Back Burner	2011	April	Rise Records
"Strange Faces"	Back Burner	2011	July	Rise Records
"Hollow"	Wasted Youth	2012	May	Artery Records
"Substance"	Non-album single	2013	May	Rise Records
"Emerald Blue"	Heavy Hearts	2014	February	Rise Records
"Stone"	Six	2018	January	Rise Records
"Ten Years"	Six	2018	February	Rise Records
"What If"	For the Fallen Dreams	2022	June	Arising Empire
"Sulfate"	For the Fallen Dreams	2022	August	Arising Empire
"Re-Animate"	For the Fallen Dreams	2022	September	Arising Empire
"No Heaven"	For the Fallen Dreams	2022	October	Arising Empire
"Last One Out"	For the Fallen Dreams	2023	January	Arising Empire

=== Featured acts ===
Changes (2008)	"Vengeance" – Chris Aslip of Suffocate Faster "Falling Down" – Matthew Hasting of MyChildren MyBride
Relentless (2009)	"Nightmares" – Jeremy McKinnon of A Day to Remember
Back Burner (2011)	"Yellow" – Mike Duce of Lower Than Atlantis
Heavy Hearts (2014)	"Dream Eater" – Garrett Rapp of The Color Morale "Smelling Salt" – Landon Tewers of The Plot in You

== Videography ==
Title	Album	Year	Month
"The Big Empty"	Back Burner	2011	May
"Let Go"	Back Burner	2012	April
"Resolvent Feelings"	Wasted Youth	2012	July
"Bombay"	Heavy Hearts	2014	September
"Stone"	Six	2018	January
"Unstoppable"	Six	2018	March
"What If"	For the Fallen Dreams	2022	June
"Re-Animate"	For the Fallen Dreams	2022	September
"No Heaven"	For the Fallen Dreams	2022	October
"Last One Out"	For the Fallen Dreams	2023	January
"Without You"	For the Fallen Dreams	2023	March

== See also ==
- List of Artery Recordings artists
- List of Rise Records artists
- Music of Michigan
