= Wage War discography =

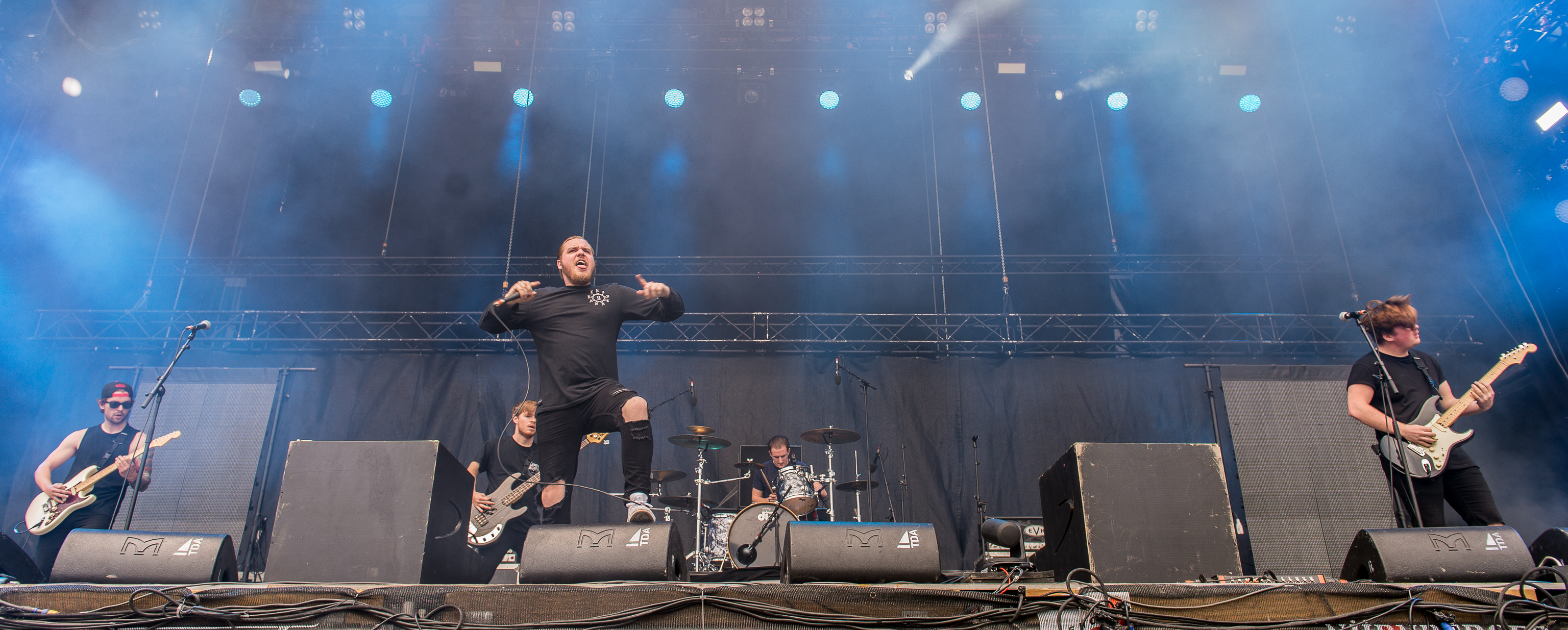
- Wage War performing at Rock im Park in 2016
- Studio albums: 6
- EPs: 2
- Singles: 27
- Music videos: 28

American metalcore band Wage War has released six studio albums, two EPs, twenty-seven singles, and twenty-eight music videos. The band self-released one EP, The Fall of Kings (2011). In 2015, the band signed to Fearless Records. The band released their first studio album, Blueprints, later in 2015 via Fearless. Their second studio album Deadweight was released under the same label in 2017. Their third studio album, Pressure, was released in 2019. Their fourth studio album, Manic, was released in 2021. Their fifth studio album, Stigma, was released in 2024, and their sixth, Landfall, followed in 2026.

== Studio albums ==
List of studio albums, with selected chart positions
Title	Album details	Peak chart positions							Sales
Title	Album details	US	US Hard Rock	US Heat	US Indie	US Rock	AUS	UK Dig.	Sales
Blueprints	Released: November 27, 2015; Label: Fearless; Formats: CD, LP, DL, streaming	—	9	3	28	43	—	—	
Deadweight	Released: August 4, 2017; Label: Fearless; Formats: CD, LP, DL, streaming	54	2	—	—	8	45	65	
Pressure	Released: August 30, 2019; Label: Fearless; Formats: CD, LP, DL, streaming	112	5	—	—	16	67	53	
Manic	Released: October 1, 2021; Label: Fearless; Formats: CD, LP, DL, streaming	—	16	—	—	—	76	51	
Stigma	Released: June 21, 2024; Label: Fearless; Formats: CD, LP, DL, streaming	—	—	—	—	—	—	67	US: 20,000
Landfall	Released: October 9, 2026; Label: Fearless	—	—	—	—	—	—	53	

== Extended plays ==
List of extended plays, with selected chart positions
Title	EP details	Peak chart positions
Title	EP details	UK Dig.
The Fall of Kings	Released: 2011; Label: Independent; Formats: EP, digital download, streaming	—
It Calls Me by Name	Released: April 17, 2026; Label: Fearless	37

== Other releases ==
List of other releases
Title	Album details
The Stripped Sessions	Released: December 2, 2022; Label: Fearless; Formats: CD, LP, digital download, streaming

== Singles ==
Title	Year	Peak chart positions			Album
Title	Year	US Hard Rock	US Main.	US Air.	Album
"Alive"	2015	—	—	—	Blueprints
"Twenty One"	2015	—	—	—	Blueprints
"Youngblood"	2015	—	—	—	Blueprints
"Stitch"	2017	—	—	—	Deadweight
"Don't Let Me Fade Away"	2017	—	—	—	Deadweight
"Witness"	2017	—	—	—	Deadweight
"Johnny Cash" (Stripped version)	2018	—	—	—	The Stripped Sessions
"Gravity" (Stripped version)	2018	—	—	—	The Stripped Sessions
"Low"	2019	—	—	—	Pressure
"Who I Am"	2019	—	—	—	Pressure
"Prison"	2019	—	—	—	Pressure
"Me Against Myself"	2019	—	—	—	Pressure
"Grave" (Stripped version)	2020	—	—	—	The Stripped Sessions
"Surrounded"	2020	—	—	—	Blueprints (Anniversary Edition)
"High Horse"	2021	16	—	—	Manic
"Circle the Drain"	2021	22	13	35	Manic
"Teeth"	2021	—	—	—	Manic
"Godspeed"	2022	—	32	—	Manic
"Magnetic"	2024	7	1	8	Stigma
"Nail5"	2024	22	—	—	Stigma
"Tombstone"	2024	16	—	—	Stigma
"Blur"	2024	19	4	14	Stigma
"Song of the Swamp"	2026	—	—	—	It Calls Me by Name & Landfall
"Blindfold"	2026	19	14	48	It Calls Me by Name & Landfall
"Sweet Dreams"	2026	25	—	—	Landfall
"Landfall"	2026	—	—	—	Landfall
"God Complex"	2026	19	—	—	Landfall

== Other charted songs ==
Title	Year	Peak chart positions	Album
Title	Year	US Hard Rock	Album
"Manic"	2021	22	Manic

== Music videos ==
Year	Title	Album	Director
2015	"Alive"	Blueprints	Drew Russ
2015	"Twenty One"	Blueprints	Max Moore Films
2015	"Blueprints"	Blueprints	Bryce Hall
2016	"Youngblood"	Blueprints	Max Moore Films
2016	"The River"	Blueprints	Graham Fielder
2017	"Stitch"	Deadweight	Drew Russ
2017	"Don't Let Me Fade Away"	Deadweight	Drew Russ
2017	"Witness"	Deadweight	Orie McGinness
2018	"Gravity"	Deadweight	Orie McGinness
2019	"Low"	Pressure	Orie McGinness
2019	"Who I Am"	Pressure	Orie McGinness
2019	"Grave"	Pressure	Drew Russ
2020	"Surrounded"	Blueprints (Five Year Anniversary Edition)	Unknown
2021	"High Horse"	Manic	Orie McGinness
2021	"Manic"	Manic	Orie McGinness
2022	"Godspeed"	Manic	Ana Massard
2024	"Magnetic"	Stigma	Unknown
2024	"Nail5"	Stigma	Orie McGinness
2024	"Tombstone"	Stigma	Ana Massard
2024	"Blur"	Stigma	Unknown
2024	"Happy Hunting"	Stigma	Dan Fusselman
2026	"Song of the Swamp"	It Calls Me by Name & Landfall	Errick Easterday
2026	"Blindfold"	It Calls Me by Name & Landfall	Errick Easterday
2026	"Sweet Dreams"	Landfall	Errick Easterday
2026	"God Complex"	Landfall	Errick Easterday
2026	"Silk"	Landfall	Unknown
