= Big Ole Album Vol. 1 =

Studio album by A Day to Remember
- Released: February 18, 2025
- Recorded: 2022–2024
- Genres: Metalcore; pop-punk; post-hardcore; emo
- Length: 39:09
- Label: Fueled by Ramen
- Producers: Jeremy McKinnon; Zakk Cervini; Drew Fulk; Andrew Wade; Colin Brittain; Cody Quistad

A Day to Remember chronology
You're Welcome (2021)	Big Ole Album Vol. 1 (2025)

Singles from Big Ole Album Vol. 1
- 1. "Miracle" Released: July 21, 2022; 2. "Feedback" Released: May 31, 2024; 3. "Make It Make Sense" Released: February 18, 2025; 4. "LeBron" Released: February 18, 2025; 5. "All My Friends" Released: July 1, 2025

Big Ole Album Vol. 1 is the eighth studio album by the American rock band A Day to Remember. It was surprise-released on physical formats on February 18, 2025, via Fueled by Ramen; a wider streaming release followed a month later on March 21. It was preceded by four singles: "Miracle", "Feedback", "Make It Make Sense", and "LeBron". This album is the first album since the band's 2013 album, Common Courtesy, to feature any kind of production by Andrew Wade.

== Release and promotion ==
On July 21, 2022, the band released a single called "Miracle" as an early hint for their next album. On May 31, 2024, the band released a single called "Feedback". This was followed by a North American tour in October and November with bands August Burns Red and Stand Atlantic.

On February 18, 2025, the band surprise-released their eighth studio album, Big Ole Album Vol. 1, in physical form, which features the two previously released singles and two new singles released on the same day, "Make It Make Sense" and "LeBron". The album has reached number five on Billboard's Top Album Sales chart. It is the band's first album without founding bassist Josh Woodard, after his departure in October 2021.

== Composition ==
Musically, the album has been described as metalcore, pop-punk, post-hardcore and emo.

== Touring ==
The band continuously promoted the album with tours throughout 2025, most notably the 2025 Vans Warped Tour alongside many other bands including Silverstein, Motion City Soundtrack, Nova Twins, and Bad Rabbits.

== Track listing ==
Big Ole Album Vol. 1 track listing
No.	Title	Writer(s)	Length
1.	"Make It Make Sense"	Jeremy McKinnon; Cody Quistad; Drew Fulk; Zakk Cervini	3:10
2.	"Feedback"	McKinnon; Trent Dabbs	2:32
3.	"Bad Blood"	McKinnon; Fulk; Cervini; Bobby Lynge; Kevin Skaff; Until the End	3:16
4.	"All My Friends"	McKinnon; Skaff; Fulk; Cervini	3:01
5.	"To the Death"	McKinnon; Quistad; Fulk	2:57
6.	"Flowers"	McKinnon; Fulk; Cervini	3:21
7.	"LeBron"	McKinnon; Fulk; Cervini	2:46
8.	"Die for Me"	McKinnon; Fulk; Oli Sykes; Cervini	2:50
9.	"Miracle"	McKinnon; Quistad; Will Putney	4:04
10.	"Same Team"	McKinnon; Quistad; Fulk; Cervini	3:32
11.	"Silence"	McKinnon; Quistad; Putney; Cervini	3:20
12.	"Closer Than You Think"	McKinnon; Fulk; Cervini	4:20
Total length:			39:09

== Personnel ==
Credits adapted from the album's liner notes and Tidal.

A Day to Remember

- Jeremy McKinnon – vocals, bass, production
- Kevin Skaff – guitars, vocals (all tracks); additional engineering (track 9)
- Neil Westfall – guitars, vocals
- Alex Shelnutt – drums

Additional contributors

- Oliver Sykes – production
- Jordan Fish – production
- Zakk Cervini – production, mixing
- Drew Fulk – production
- Andrew Wade – production, engineering (9)
- Colin Brittain – production, engineering (9)
- Cody Quistad – production, engineering (9)
- Ted Jensen – mastering
- Phil Roberts – album cover
- Virgilio Tzaj – layout, design
- Jimmy Fontaine – photography
- Tianna Groelly – creative production
- Mandee Mallonee – video production

== Charts ==
Chart performance for Big Ole Album Vol. 1
Chart (2025)	Peak position
Australian Albums (ARIA)	44
Austrian Albums (Ö3 Austria)	56
German Albums (Offizielle Top 100)	44
New Zealand Albums (RMNZ)	16
Scottish Albums (Official Charts)	13
UK Album Downloads (Official Charts)	26
UK Rock & Metal Albums (Official Charts)	2
US Billboard 200	155
US Top Rock & Alternative Albums (Billboard)	30
