= Bad Vibrations =

Studio album by A Day to Remember
- Released: September 2, 2016
- Recorded: 2015
- Studios: The Blasting Room, Fort Collins, Colorado
- Genres: Metalcore; pop-punk; post-hardcore
- Length: 41:43
- Labels: ADTR; Epitaph
- Producers: Bill Stevenson; Jason Livermore

A Day to Remember chronology
Common Courtesy (2013)	Bad Vibrations (2016)	You're Welcome (2021)

Singles from Bad Vibrations
- 1. "Paranoia" Released: March 11, 2016; 2. "Bad Vibrations" Released: June 3, 2016; 3. "Bullfight" Released: July 25, 2016; 4. "Naivety" Released: August 19, 2016; 5. "We Got This" Released: September 1, 2016; 6. "Same About You" Released: January 23, 2018

Bad Vibrations is the sixth studio album by the American rock band A Day to Remember, released on September 2, 2016, by ADTR Records and Epitaph Records. This is the second album since the band's departure from Victory Records, and their first and only album to be featured in partnership with Epitaph. The album debuted at number two on the Billboard 200 chart, making it the band's highest-charting album in the United States. The album was supported by six singles: "Paranoia", "Bad Vibrations", "Bullfight", "Naivety", "We Got This", and "Same About You", and was met with widespread critical acclaim.

== Background ==
In December 2011, it was announced that A Day to Remember had plans of filing a lawsuit against their label, Victory, due to breach of contract. Claiming withheld royalties of over $75,000, the group had reportedly started legal action against Victory on May 31 of that year. Victory has said, on their behalf, that the lawsuit is actually about the band's refusal to fulfill their 5 album contractual commitment to Victory and their new-found desire to move to a major label. While this lawsuit was ongoing, the band self-released Common Courtesy through their own label, ADTR Records in 2013. Following the album's release and tour cycle, the group took a break. Vocalist Jeremy McKinnon explained the band was "doing our own thing, taking it easy and trying to recharge the batteries".

== Composition ==
At the start of 2015, the group rented a cabin at Horsetooth Reservoir, located in Dakota Hogback ridge, west of Fort Collins, Colorado. The cabin was surrounded by woods. According to McKinnon, the group "just wrote together in a room, which was the polar opposite of the last three albums we've made". Typically, McKinnon would have some material saved to show the group, however, this time round he didn't have any. McKinnon went on to describe the album as containing "an element of returning to our roots", in that the album was their first since For Those Who Have Heart (2007) to feature full contributions from all members of the band. For Bad Vibrations, it was the first time since For Those Who Have Heart that the group had written together in a room. While some of the group's previous albums were written while on tour, McKinnon considered it "important to me and the rest of the band to get everybody involved in a room, properly involved and just write a record together".

The group wrote music "casually for fun" without any expectations, according to McKinnon. For the most part, McKinnon would have either a chorus or melody idea that the rest of the group would flesh out into a song. On some occasions, the group would jam and have a finished song in an hour. For their past two albums, What Separates Me from You (2010) and Common Courtesy (2013), the group had trouble naturally writing heavy songs. McKinnon reassured that there was "a lot of heavy songs on there". Cody Quistad of Wage War often accompanied the band for these writing sessions. (Note: Quistad previously worked with the band; co-writing "Sometimes You're the Hammer, Sometimes You're the Nail" from Common Courtesy.) The group wrote for 30 days, completing at least one song per day. Writing sessions lasted eight-to-ten hours. By the end of this period, the group had around 40 songs in total.

== Music and lyrics ==
McKinnon states that the album's title, Bad Vibrations, is derived from feelings of stress and anxiety. The album's sound has been described as metalcore and pop-punk. "Bad Vibrations", written by McKinnon, guitarists Kevin Skaff and Neil Westfall, and Cody Quistad, was the final song written for the album. According to McKinnon, the song is about "being overwhelmingly stressed and what it does to you". The breakdown during the song is heavily inspired by a drum pattern that Mark Castillo of Bury Your Dead would play, according to Shelnutt. One day the group were working on a song but had hit a roadblock with it and were about to call it day. McKinnon heard Skaff playing a random riff. McKinnon then "immediately heard the first half of Paranoia. I immediately showed everybody in the room how to play it". The group composed the breakdown together, finishing "Paranoia" under 30 minutes. McKinnon was writing the lyrics with Skaff and Westfall during the evening, and recorded a demo the following morning. The song's lyrics were inspired by an event McKinnon and his girlfriend experienced during Halloween a few years prior: a kid banged on McKinnon's window at 3 am, an experience he called "terrifying".

"Naivety", written by McKinnon, Skaff and Descendents drummer Bill Stevenson, talks about loss of innocence. According to McKinnon "it's that feeling before you try, and then you get killed". "Exposed" was written by McKinnon, Quistad, Westfall and Skaff. McKinnon described it as being "a heavy song, but it's less 2000s hardcore than a riffier, modern-heavy sound". The song is about the way people make negative comments about the world. "Bullfight", written by McKinnon, Westfall and Skaff, is about a person who is changed when something positive happens to them. "Reassemble" was written between McKinnon and the group's long-time producer Andrew Wade. McKinnon showed it to the band and they adapted it to fit the group. The song talks about someone who struggled with addiction. "Justified", written by McKinnon, Westfall, Quistad, Stevenson and Skaff, came about from an idea Westfall previous had. The group loved the song early on in the writing process. Lyrically, the song is about judgemental people who have a distaste for others for simply having different beliefs to them.

"We Got This", written by McKinnon, Westfall and Skaff, is about when you are a young person in "a music scene people don't really understand or respect, but then going to these shows and realising this is something you love". The song was attempted during sessions for Common Courtesy, but the group weren't happy with it. With help from Stevenson, the group resolved the problems they had with the track. "Same About You", written by McKinnon, Westfall, Skaff and drummer Alex Shelnutt, talks about a person who tells you something, which causes you to look at them differently. "Turn Off the Radio", written by McKinnon, Westfall, Wade and Skaff, was another song that was intended for Common Courtesy. The song's original bridge contained a rap beat and was intended to feature rapper Rick Ross. Ross asked if the group were satanists. McKinnon responded: "Evidently, somebody told him yes and we never heard from him again." "Forgive and Forget", written by McKinnon, the band's former guitarist Tom Denney, Skaff and Wade, is about being addicted to a significant other. "Negative Space" was written by McKinnon, bassist Josh Woodard and Skaff. "In Florida" was written by McKinnon, Westfall and Skaff.

== Production ==
The band demoed all of the material they had live-in-the-studio with producers Stevenson and Jason Livermore at The Blasting Room in Fort Collins, Colorado. McKinnon spoke to TeamRock about his initial concerns when preparing to record the album, stating that he was "terrified" and "stuck in this weird, high-stress mindset every day". Selecting the material to be recorded for Bad Vibrations, the group narrowed the number of songs down to those they loved the most regardless of genre. Previously, McKinnon would be "a little bit more "in control"", having co-produced several of the band's past albums, however, for Bad Vibrations, he "took a step back" and let Stevenson be in control.

McKinnon added that he "went in to record [the album] with nothing much to offer – with hardly anything that I was excited about". McKinnon later called it "one of the most unique recording experiences we've ever had", and working with Stevenson as "an awesome experience. He was a bit hard to read at first, so I think we subconsciously pushed ourselves harder to try to impress him. As a result, we gave this album everything we had". The group recorded several extra tracks that didn't make the final track listing. The recording sessions were engineered by Livermore, Stevenson, Andrew Berlin, Chris Beeble and Wade. Berlin also provided additional production. The album was mixed by Andy Wallace at Soundtrack Studios, located in New York City, New York. Mastering was performed by Ted Jensen at Sterling Sound, in New York City.

Phil Norman played cello for "Forgive and Forget", "Negative Space", "Justified", "We Got This" and "Exposed". Ian Short played violin on "Forgive and Forget", "Justified" and "We Got This". Adrienne Short played violin and viola on "Forgive and Forget", "Reassemble", "Negative Space", "Justified", "We Got This" and "Exposed". Miles Stevenson, Maddie Stevenson, Wade, Nicole Dunn, Beeble, Berlin and Livermore provided background vocals for "Negative Space".

== Artwork and packaging ==
In an interview with Kerrang!, McKinnon revealed that the album's artwork wasn't finalised because "no-one's nailed it". As a result, the band were unable to put up pre-orders, despite the album having been completed since December 2015. Eventually, illustrator Mike Cortada came up with the album's artwork. Cortada previously created artwork for a number of the band's albums and singles, as well as designs for their tours and music videos. He called creating the Bad Vibrations artwork "very intense". The group didn't have any concept for the artwork other than making it display a "darker, heavier vibe". After being told this, Cortada started creating the artwork. When he created the cover, he texted the band. Westfall provided "more direction", which resulted in Cortada making adjustments. McKinnon then suggested an idea "until we were in a fully-fledged artistic brainstorming session".

By this point, Cortada was drawing in real-time. He then came up with a mock-up of the album booklet layout, wanting it "to be something very special and unique with a lot of depth". He made a video of the layout and sent it to the band who loved the idea but weren't a fan of the illustration style. Following the creation of several additional cover sketches, McKinnon said "he liked one in particular. It was just right". The colours came "naturally" to Cortada. He called the final artwork "a pretty intense and outrageous art piece" made of "illustrations, all hand drawn, pen-to-paper, and scanned".

== Release ==
"Paranoia" was premiered on Zane Lowe's Beats 1 show on Apple Music on March 9, 2016. A music video was released a day later, directed by Ethan Lader. The video features McKinnon laying on a psychiatrist's couch. Later in the video, the band is being chased by a figure that Loudwire considered "a cross between Lost's smoke monster and Disturbed's "The Guy" mascot". A day after this, the song was released as a single. In May, the group went on a US tour, titled Just Some Shows, with support from Parkway Drive and State Champs. On June 2, Bad Vibrations was announced, and a video for "Bad Vibrations" was released. The video, directed by Drew Russ, is performance-based, featuring stage lights flashing throughout it. A day later, the title-track was released as a single. "Bad Vibrations" was released to radio on June 15. From late July to early October, the band supported Blink-182 on their North American tour.

"Bullfight" was premiered on BBC Radio 1's Rock Show with Daniel P Carter, before being released as a single on July 25. A music video was released for "Bullfight" on August 16, directed by Darren Doane. The video begins with an artist creating portraits across a number of canvases. The imagery on the canvases crosses over into real life with the artist being shot by one of his own creations. While attempting to fight his creations, he is aided by McKinnon. The video finishes with a quote from Lao Tzu, the founder of Taoism. The artwork in the video was animated by Rob Prior. "Naivety" was released as a single on August 19 and released to radio on August 24. "We Got This" was premiered on Beats 1 Radio on August 31, and released as a single a day later.

Bad Vibrations was originally set to be released on August 19 through ADTR Records, with distribution handled by Epitaph Records. However, the album was pushed back to a September 2 release date due to a custom cut album casing taking longer than expected to manufacture. It was made available for streaming the day prior. In December 2016, the band embarked on the "Bad Vibes" tour, which began in Australia with support from Of Mice & Men and Tonight Alive. The Australian leg was followed by a UK leg in January 2017 with support from New Found Glory, Neck Deep and Moose Blood, with a full European tour being undertaken in February. "Same About You" was released to rock radio stations on January 23, 2018.

== Critical reception ==
Professional ratings
Aggregate scores
Source	Rating
Metacritic	81/100
Review scores
Source	Rating
Alternative Press	Favorable
Kerrang!	4/5 stars
Punknews.org	3/5 stars
Rock Sound	8/10

Upon release, Bad Vibrations was met with widespread critical acclaim. At Metacritic, which assigns a normalized rating out of 100 to reviews from mainstream publications, the album received an average score of 81, based on 4 reviews, indicating "universal acclaim". Evan Lucy of Alternative Press praised the album's production and lyrics, saying "As adept as the band are at alternating between metalcore and pop-punk, McKinnon's words are similarly nuanced and multifaceted here." Rob Sayce of Rock Sound praised the album's themes, but noted how the album felt less focused than it predecessor, Common Courtesy, writing "While it's not the career-defining milestone that some were anticipating, this album still offers up enough melancholy mayhem to keep ADTR ahead of the chasing pack." Kerrang! magazine compared Bad Vibrations to the band's earlier work, calling it their "heaviest record since 2007's For Those Who Have Heart." Renaldo of Punknews.org wrote, "On this particular album, [A Day to Remember] achieve just the right amount of flair and flavour to spice things up with character and believe it or not, lyrical depth." He criticized the middle part of the album, however, calling it "tedious": "Track-wise, there are some growers. Then you've got some tedious chores to work through mid-way but overall, the album ends on a fairly decent note."

== Commercial performance ==
The album debuted at number 2 in the United States, selling over 62,000 in its first week. The album also reached number 1 in Australia, number 6 in the United Kingdom, number 7 in Austria and Germany, number 9 in Canada, number 17 in Switzerland, and number 23 in New Zealand. "Paranoia" peaked at number 5 on the Rock Digital Songs chart, number 8 on the Mainstream Rock Songs chart, number 13 on the Hot Rock Songs chart, and number 35 on the Rock Airplay chart. "Bad Vibrations" peaked at number 37 on the Rock Digital Songs chart, and number 48 on the Hot Rock Songs chart. By the end of 2016, the album had sold 102,000 copies in the US.

== Track listing ==
Credits per deluxe edition booklet.

No.	Title	Music	Length
1.	"Bad Vibrations"	Jeremy McKinnon; Kevin Skaff; Neil Westfall; Cody Quistad	3:33
2.	"Paranoia"	McKinnon; Skaff; Westfall	3:20
3.	"Naivety"	McKinnon; Skaff; Bill Stevenson	3:19
4.	"Exposed"	McKinnon; Quistad; Westfall; Skaff	3:38
5.	"Bullfight"	McKinnon; Westfall; Skaff	4:35
6.	"Reassemble"	Andrew Wade; McKinnon; Westfall; Skaff	3:57
7.	"Justified"	McKinnon; Westfall; Quistad; Stevenson; Skaff	3:58
8.	"We Got This"	McKinnon; Westfall; Skaff	3:49
9.	"Same About You"	McKinnon; Westfall; Skaff; Alex Shelnutt	3:04
10.	"Turn Off the Radio"	McKinnon; Westfall; Wade; Skaff	3:46
11.	"Forgive and Forget"	McKinnon; Tom Denney; Skaff; Wade	4:42
Total length:			41:41

Bonus tracks

Deluxe edition bonus tracks
No.	Title	Music	Length
12.	"Negative Space"	McKinnon; Josh Woodard; Skaff	3:37
13.	"In Florida"	McKinnon; Westfall; Skaff	3:22
Total length:			48:40

== Personnel ==
Personnel per deluxe edition booklet.

A Day to Remember

- Jeremy McKinnon – lead vocals
- Neil Westfall – rhythm guitar, backing vocals
- Josh Woodard – bass guitar
- Alex Shelnutt – drums
- Kevin Skaff – lead guitar, backing vocals

Additional musicians

- Phil Norman – cello (tracks 4, 7, 8, 11 and 12)
- Ian Short – violin (tracks 7, 8 and 11)
- Adrienne Short – violin and viola (tracks 4, 6–8, 11 and 12)
- Miles Stevenson – background vocals (track 12)
- Maddie Stevenson – background vocals (track 12)
- Andrew Wade – background vocals (track 12)
- Nicole Dunn – background vocals (track 12)
- Chris Beeble – background vocals (track 12)
- Andrew Berlin – background vocals (track 12)
- Jason Livermore – background vocals (track 12)

Production

- Bill Stevenson – producer, engineer
- Jason Livermore – producer, engineer
- Andrew Berlin – engineer, additional production
- Chris Beeble – engineer
- Andrew Wade – engineer
- Andy Wallace – mixing
- Paul Suarez – Pro Tools engineer
- Ted Jensen – mastering
- Mike Cortada – all artwork, layout
- James Hartley – live photography

== Charts ==
=== Weekly charts ===
Chart (2016)	Peak position
Australian Albums (ARIA)	1
Austrian Albums (Ö3 Austria)	7
Belgian Albums (Ultratop Flanders)	30
Belgian Albums (Ultratop Wallonia)	90
Canadian Albums (Billboard)	9
Dutch Albums (Album Top 100)	118
German Albums (Offizielle Top 100)	7
New Zealand Albums (RMNZ)	23
Scottish Albums (Official Charts)	5
Swiss Albums (Schweizer Hitparade)	17
UK Albums (Official Charts)	6
US Billboard 200	2
US Independent Albums (Billboard)	1
US Top Album Sales (Billboard)	1
US Top Alternative Albums (Billboard)	1
US Top Hard Rock Albums (Billboard)	1
US Top Rock Albums (Billboard)	1
US Vinyl Albums (Billboard)	4

=== Year-end charts ===
Chart (2016)	Position
US Top Rock Albums (Billboard)	36
