= Landfall (Wage War album) =

Studio album by Wage War
- Released: October 9, 2026
- Genre: Metalcore
- Length: 42:53
- Label: Fearless
- Producer: Cody Quistad

Wage War chronology
It Calls Me by Name (2026)	Landfall (2026)

Singles from Landfall
- 1. "Sweet Dreams" Released: August 14, 2026; 2. "Landfall" Released: September 4, 2026; 3. "God Complex" Released: October 5, 2026

Landfall is the sixth studio album by the American metalcore band Wage War. It was released on October 9, 2026, through Fearless Records, and was produced by Cody Quistad.

== Background and release ==
On February 24, 2026, the band released the single "Song of the Swamp", as the lead single for their EP, It Calls Me by Name. The EP was released April 17, and the track "Blindfold" was also released as a single. The EP, which was well received by critics, was praised for its use of atmosphere inspired by the band's Floridian origins.

The band released a single entitled "Sweet Dreams" on August 14, initially promoted as a standalone single. The band explained that the song was about "being deceived by the world around you" and that they drew inspiration from much of their previous work. The song was accompanied by a music video directed by Errick Easterday.

On September 4, the band revealed their sixth studio album, Landfall. Set for release on October 9, the band also revealed the cover art and tracklist, including previous singles from the EP and "Sweet Dreams". Alongside the album's announcement, the band released the title track as a single, themed around "imminent danger", and described as "apocalyptic", with Briton Bond screaming the lyric "all life becomes extinct" and additionally including emergency broadcast sound effects. The band explained that the single builds upon Floridian themes touched on in their EP, this time referring to weather:

"Referencing our Florida roots, the hurricane imagery became a way of talking about that feeling of being completely at the mercy of something bigger than yourself. Musically, we wanted the verses to feel heavy and threatening, with the chorus being somber and inevitable."

The album, produced by Cody Quistad, is the band's first to be produced themselves. Speaking about the album's writing process as a whole, Quistad said they aimed to "put forth the most identifiable sonic footprint of who we are as a band", stating they didn't want to follow trends and instead "cherry-picked" the best parts of their previous work.

On October 5, the band released a fifth single, titled "God Complex".

The album released ahead of the band's Emergency Broadcast North American tour in October and November 2026, supported by We Came as Romans, Varials, and Cane Hill. The band are also set to tour Europe in January 2027, supported by Invent Animate and Wild Walkers.

== Critical reception ==
Professional ratings
Review scores
Source	Rating
Blabbermouth.net	8/10
Boolin Tunes	8/10
Kerrang!	3/5
Still Listening	78%
Wall of Sound	9/10

Landfall was well received by critics.

Olly Thomas of Kerrang! praised the band for "refusing to limit themselves". Writing for Blabbermouth.net, Anne Erickson praised the album for sounding "confident, polished and very much like Wage War have figured out what they want to be right now". Wall of Sound's Adam Rice wrote "there's plenty here to satisfy every fan". Jonathan Tan of Boolin Tunes called the album a "full-on redemption", citing a less positive reception for Stigma.

== Track listing ==
All tracks are written by Cody Quistad, with additional co-writers where noted.

Landfall track listing
No.	Title	Writer(s)	Length
1.	"Landfall"	Briton Bond; Chris Gaylord; Drew Fulk; Seth Blake; Stephen Kluesener	3:42
2.	"Sweet Dreams"		3:07
3.	"Silk"	Bond; Gaylord; Blake; Kluesener	3:10
4.	"Figure 8"	Blake	3:05
5.	"God Complex"		2:55
6.	"Stay with Me"	Blake	3:39
7.	"Silence Has Spoken"	Michael Whitworth; Blake	3:11
8.	"Way of Pain"	Fulk	3:03
9.	"Red Dot"	Bond; Gaylord; Blake; Kluesener	2:10
10.	"Blindfold"		3:14
11.	"Spellbound"	Whitworth	3:23
12.	"Song of the Swamp"	Gaylord; Blake	3:18
13.	"Silhouette"		4:56
Total length:			42:53

=== Notes ===
- "Red Dot" is stylized as "R3D DOT"

== Personnel ==
Credits adapted from Tidal.

Wage War

- Briton Bond – lead vocals
- Seth Blake – lead guitar
- Cody Quistad – rhythm guitar, clean vocals, production
- Chris Gaylord – bass
- Stephen Kluesener – drums

Additional personnel

- Drew Fulk – production (10, 12), recording engineering
- Will Carlson – mixing
- Chris Gehringer – mastering
- Kellen McGregor – recording engineering (1–9, 11, 13)
- Andrew Wade – recording engineering (1–9, 11, 13), additional production (2), additional engineering (10, 12)

== Charts ==
Chart performance for Stigma
Chart (2026)	Peak position
UK Album Downloads (Official Charts)	53
