= Magnetic (Wage War song) =

2024 song by Wage War

Single by Wage War

from the album Stigma
- Released: March 21, 2024
- Genre: Hard rock
- Length: 3:12
- Label: Fearless
- Songwriters: Cody Quistad; Drew Fulk
- Producers: Quistad; Fulk

Wage War singles chronology
"Godspeed" (2022)	"Magnetic" (2024)	"Nail5" (2024)

Music video
- "Magnetic" on YouTube

"Magnetic" is a song by American metalcore band Wage War. It was released as the lead single from their fifth studio album, Stigma. It is the band's first number one song on the Billboard Mainstream Rock Airplay chart.

== Background and release ==
"Magnetic" was Wage War's first new song since their 2021 album, Manic. According to the band, the song is about an attraction to someone that "can't seem to quit" despite knowing what may be best, adding that "fate decides our future". Guitarist Cody Quistad said that "Magnetic" probably took the most time to complete on Stigma, as the band wanted to make it reminiscent of their previous work while also making it different from what they had done before. Vocalist Briton Bond said that producer Drew Fulk encouraged him to perform outside his comfort zone. Bond also said that he and Quistad "play off of each other really well" on the track and described his and Quistad's dynamic as "fire and ice" or "sweet and spicy".

The song premiered via SiriusXM's Octane on March 20, 2024, coinciding with the release of its music video. It was then released as a single the next day via Fearless Records on March 21, 2024. Discussing the release of "Magnetic", Quistad said that "one song doesn't define this band", adding that the band wanted to reflect the music its members enjoyed. He also said that some commenters expressed surprise at how the band sounded on "Magnetic".

== Composition ==
MetalSucks described "Magnetic" as heavy, melodic, and experimental, with chugs, breakdown moments, fast drumming, and moments of "clarity and calm".

== Critical reception ==
HM Magazine wrote that "Magnetic" combines melodic verses and choruses with hard-charging roars and thick riffs, while Rock Sound wrote that it builds to an "explosive ending". Kerrang! commented that the song has the band's "biggest and poppiest" chorus to date. Distorted Sound noted the contrast between Quistad's clean vocals and Bond's harsher vocals. Blabbermouth.net described the song as soft, ethereal and pop-friendly, calling it the band's "most mainstream-sounding" song to date. Sputnikmusic criticized "Magnetic" for following what it considered a familiar songwriting formula and described its breakdown as "shoe-horned".

== Track listing ==
"Magnetic" single
No.	Title	Length
1.	"Magnetic"	3:12

Notes

- Track 1 is stylized in all caps.

== Chart performance ==
"Magnetic" became the band's first number-one song on a Billboard chart when it reached the top of the Mainstream Rock Airplay chart dated August 24, 2024. It had previously become the band's first top-10 hit on the chart.

== Personnel ==
Credits adapted from Apple Music.

Wage War

- Briton Bond – lead vocals
- Cody Quistad – guitars, backing vocals, production, engineering
- Chris Gaylord – bass
- Stephen Kluesener – drums
- Seth Blake – backing vocals

Production and engineering

- Zakk Cervini – mixing
- Ted Jensen – mastering
- Drew Fulk – production, engineering
- Seth Drake – immersive mixing

== Charts ==
=== Weekly charts ===
Weekly chart performance for "Magnetic"
Chart (2024–2025)	Peak position
Canada Mainstream Rock (Billboard Canada)	30
US Rock & Alternative Airplay (Billboard)	8
US Mainstream Rock Airplay (Billboard)	1

=== Year-end charts ===
Year-end chart performance for "Magnetic"
Chart (2024)	Position
US Rock & Alternative Airplay (Billboard)	48
US Mainstream Rock Airplay (Billboard)	7

Chart (2025)	Position
Canada Mainstream Rock (Billboard)	77
