= It Calls Me by Name =

EP by Wage War
- Released: April 17, 2026
- Genre: Metalcore
- Length: 15:45
- Label: Fearless
- Producers: Cody Quistad; Drew Fulk

Wage War chronology
Stigma (2024)	It Calls Me by Name (2026)	Landfall (2026)

Singles from It Calls Me by Name
- 1. "Song of the Swamp" Released: February 24, 2026; 2. "Blindfold" Released: April 17, 2026

It Calls Me by Name (stylized in all caps) is the second extended play (EP) by the American metalcore band Wage War. It was released on April 17, 2026, through Fearless Records, and was produced by Cody Quistad and Drew Fulk.

== Background and release ==
On February 24, 2026, the band released the single "Song of the Swamp", alongside its music video directed by Errick Easterday. The music video depicts the band performing on a dock in a boggy swamp environment, highlighting the track's theme around the band's Floridian roots. Alongside the single's release, the band also announced they would be released an EP, entitled It Calls Me by Name, taken from a lyric within the single, on April 17 through Fearless Records, ahead of their touring dates in the US starting April 28 with Nevertel and Orthodox. Upon the EP's release on April 17, "Blindfold" was also released as a single, also accompanied by a music video by Easterday. "Song of the Swamp" and "Blindfold" were subsequently included in the band's sixth studio album Landfall, which released October 9, 2026.

== Composition ==
The EP has been described as metalcore, with elements of nu-metal, and djent.

Described by the band as "five tracks shaped by Florida, the swamp, and the relentless aggression of nature," the EP is themed around the band's origins in Florida, with references to swamps and alligators. Reviewers have noted on the EP's swamp-like, "earthy," "primal," and "savage" ambiance and character, and the use of "reptilian soundbites."

== Critical reception ==
Professional ratings
Review scores
Source	Rating
Boolin Tunes	7/10
Distorted Sound	9/10
Noizze	7/10
Out of Rage	8/10
Wall of Sound	8.5/10

It Calls Me by Name was well received by critics.

Writing for Distorted Sound magazine, Ed Walton praised the EP, calling it some of the best music in metalcore in 2026 and "a bruising and uncompromising work that leaves no prisoners as it takes your eardrums to the limit." Kayla Hamilton of Wall of Sound called the EP a "very solid release", praising the band's use of Florida a theme. Téa Kelly of Boolin Tunes also commented on the theme, noting "an interesting level of character, creating an unusual backdrop accompanied by reptilian soundbites." Hayley Nicole of Noizze said the EP was "a way of delivering the band's roots in audible form, honing in on their original sound." Out of Rage's Theviya Kanrunaharan praised the EP's ambiance and the band for refining their skills.

== Track listing ==
All tracks are written by Cody Quistad with additional writers where noted.

It Calls Me by Name EP track listing
No.	Title	Writer(s)	Length
1.	"Song of the Swamp"	Chris Gaylord; Seth Blake	3:18
2.	"4×4"	Briton Bond; Drew Fulk	2:43
3.	"Blindfold"		3:13
4.	"Karma"	Michael Whitworth; Riley Thomas	3:33
5.	"Purify"	Gaylord; Blake	2:56
Total length:			15:45

=== Notes ===
- All tracks are stylized in all caps

== Personnel ==
Credits adapted from Tidal.

Wage War

- Briton Bond – lead vocals
- Seth Blake – lead guitar
- Cody Quistad – rhythm guitar, clean vocals, production
- Chris Gaylord – bass
- Stephen Kluesener – drums

Additional personnel

- Drew Fulk – production, recording engineering
- Chris Gehringer – mastering
- Will Carlson – mixing
- Andrew Wade – additional engineering
