= Paranoia (A Day to Remember song) =

Single by A Day to Remember

from the album Bad Vibrations
- Released: March 9, 2016
- Recorded: Colorado, 2016
- Genre: Metalcore; hardcore punk
- Length: 3:22
- Label: ADTR
- Songwriters: Jeremy McKinnon, Kevin Skaff, Neil Westfall
- Producers: Bill Stevenson, Jason Livermore

A Day to Remember singles chronology
"End of Me" (2014)	"Paranoia" (2016)	"Bad Vibrations" (2016)

"Paranoia" is a single from American rock band A Day to Remember, released on March 9, 2016.

== Music video ==
A music video for the song, directed by Ethan Lader, was released on 10 March 2016.

== Track listing ==
1. "Paranoia" – 3:22

== Chart positions ==
Chart performance for "Paranoia"
Chart (2016)	Peak position
Australia (ARIA)	86
UK Singles Downloads (OCC)	71
UK Singles Sales (OCC)	71
UK Rock & Metal (OCC)	1
US Hot Rock & Alternative Songs (Billboard)	13
US Mainstream Rock (Billboard)	8

== Certifications ==
Region	Certification	Certified units/sales
United States (RIAA)	Gold	500,000^{‡}
^{‡} Sales+streaming figures based on certification alone.
