= You're Welcome (A Day to Remember album) =

Studio album by A Day to Remember
- Released: March 5, 2021
- Recorded: 2019–2020
- Genre: Pop rock; pop-punk; post-hardcore; metalcore
- Length: 46:21
- Label: Fueled by Ramen
- Producer: Colin Brittain; Jeremy McKinnon; Mike Green; Will Putney; Dan Book

A Day to Remember chronology
| Bad Vibrations (2016) | You're Welcome (2021) | Big Ole Album Vol. 1 (2025) |

Singles from You're Welcome
- 1. "Degenerates" Released: August 20, 2019; 2. "Resentment" Released: November 22, 2019; 3. "Mindreader" Released: April 15, 2020; 4. "Brick Wall" Released: November 18, 2020; 5. "Everything We Need" Released: January 27, 2021; 6. "Re-Entry" Released: January 25, 2022 (remix)

You're Welcome is the seventh studio album by the American rock band A Day to Remember. It was released on March 5, 2021, and is the band's first release under major label Fueled by Ramen after spending six years as an independent band after leaving and the eventual lawsuit against former label Victory Records. The album is also the first new release by the band in five years, since Bad Vibrations (2016), marking the longest gap between two albums in their career. The album's producers include Colin Brittain, vocalist Jeremy McKinnon, Mike Green, Will Putney, and Dan Book. It was preceded by five singles: "Degenerates", "Resentment", "Mindreader", "Brick Wall", and "Everything We Need". It is also the final album to feature founding bassist Josh Woodard before his departure in October 2021.

== Composition ==
Musically, You're Welcome has been described as pop-punk, pop, pop rock, metalcore, and post-hardcore. The album marks a significant departure from their metalcore/pop punk roots, with only a few songs falling within those genres as the album as a whole features more of a pop/pop rock sound. In an interview with NME, the band's vocalist Jeremy McKinnon went in-depth with the album's sound, describing it as a "happier" record.

In another interview with Kerrang!, McKinnon states that he wanted to take the "A Day to Remember sound" and "take on modern influences" with it. He also says that his love for the freedom and collaborative writing process found in EDM and rap resulted in the band getting together and throwing around ideas which resulted in the band demoing 42 songs. It got to the point to where some of the songs they wrote went from indie rock, to punk rock, to even "full tilt heavy". He would also talk about fan expectations and made it a goal to not stray too far from the band's core sound, with some songs ultimately being left out due to them wanting to push their sound in a way that "makes sense".

== Release and promotion ==
On June 14, 2019, EDM producer Marshmello released a collaboration track with the band titled "Rescue Me", marking A Day to Remember's first new release in three years. On August 20, the band released the first single "Degenerates" alongside the announcement of the album as well as the band signing to Fueled by Ramen. It was eventually announced that the album would be released on November 15, 2019.

On November 8, during a show at the House of Vans in London, it was announced that the album has been delayed until early 2020. The band's guitarist Kevin Skaff later explained it was due to the album's mixing and artwork not being completed. A week after the album's original release date, the band released the single "Resentment". On April 15, 2020, the band released "Mindreader" alongside an animated music video. On November 18, one year after the album's original release date, the band released "Brick Wall" as well as revealing the album's artwork, tracklist, and release date for the album. On January 27, 2021, the album's fifth single, "Everything We Need" was released. On March 10, a music video was released for the album's fifth single "Everything We Need". On December 16, the band released a music video for the song "Last Chance to Dance (Bad Friend)".

== Critical reception ==
Professional ratings
Review scores
| Source | Rating |
|---|---|
| AllMusic | 3.5/5 stars |
| Kerrang! | 3/5 |
| New Noise Magazine | 5/5 stars |
| NME | 2/5 stars |
| Riff Magazine | 8/10 |
| Wall of Sound | 5.5/10 |

NME called the album a "mish-mash of sounds and moany lyrics," and also stated that "there are more misses than hits here, as A Day To Remember struggle to work out who their band should be in 2021." Wall of Sound rated You're Welcome 5.5/10, feeling that the band changed their style simultaneously too drastically and quickly and likening it to Thirty Seconds to Mars' stylistic changes between A Beautiful Lie (2005) and This Is War (2009). He summarized that You're Welcome "..had so much potential for [the band] to deliver new sounds and styles that’d unite fans together. Unfortunately, it comes across like a forced, rush job..." Sam Law echoed these sentiments throughout his review for Kerrang!, remarking that the album was "slick but insubstantial".

In a more positive review, Riff Magazine's Mike DeWald praised the album for its maturity and adaptability to many different styles, concluding that "those looking for only heavy guitar riffs and screaming aggression may want to look elsewhere, but those willing to take a musical journey will be rewarded."

== Track listing ==
You're Welcome track listing
| No. | Title | Writer(s) | Length |
|---|---|---|---|
| 1. | "Brick Wall" | Jeremy McKinnon; Colin Brittain; Kevin Skaff | 3:30 |
| 2. | "Mindreader" | McKinnon; Mike Green | 2:53 |
| 3. | "Bloodsucker" | Andrew Fulk; Brittain; McKinnon; Skaff; Neil Westfall | 3:10 |
| 4. | "Last Chance to Dance (Bad Friend)" | McKinnon; Westfall; Will Putney | 3:05 |
| 5. | "F.Y.M." | McKinnon; Brittain; Skaff | 2:59 |
| 6. | "High Diving" | McKinnon; Brittain; Jonathan Russell; Matthew Aveiro; Matthew Maust; Nathan Willett | 3:27 |
| 7. | "Resentment" | Cody Quistad; McKinnon | 3:47 |
| 8. | "Looks Like Hell" | Brittain; McKinnon | 3:39 |
| 9. | "Viva La Mexico" | A Day to Remember; Brittain | 3:37 |
| 10. | "Only Money" | Dan Book; McKinnon; Westfall | 3:30 |
| 11. | "Degenerates" | McKinnon; Green | 3:04 |
| 12. | "Permanent" | Quistad; McKinnon | 3:42 |
| 13. | "Re-Entry" | McKinnon; Green; Zac Carper | 2:53 |
| 14. | "Everything We Need" | McKinnon; Jon Bellion; Nick Long; Brittain | 3:05 |
| Total length: | | | 46:21 |

== Personnel ==
Credits adapted from Tidal.

A Day to Remember

- Jeremy McKinnon – lead vocals, production
- Neil Westfall – rhythm guitar, backing vocals
- Josh Woodard – bass guitar
- Alex Shelnutt – drums
- Kevin Skaff – lead guitar, backing vocals

Additional musicians

- Aaron Brooks – additional guitar (7)

Additional personnel

- Colin Brittain – production (all tracks), mixing (3, 4, 6, 8, 9, 12, 13)
- Mike Green – production (2, 11)
- Will Putney – production (4)
- Dan Book – production (10)
- Drew Fulk – additional production (3)
- Josh Wilbur – mixing (1)
- Neal Avron – mixing (2, 11)
- Tom Lord-Alge – mixing (5, 14)
- Dan Lancaster – mixing (7)
- Alex Tumay – mixing (10)
- Mike Kalajian – mastering (all tracks)
- Scott Skrzynski – additional editing, assistant mixing (2, 11)
- Rhys May – assistant mixing (7)

== Charts ==
=== Weekly charts ===
Weekly chart performance for You're Welcome
| Chart (2021) | Peak position |
|---|---|
| Australian Albums (ARIA) | 9 |
| Austrian Albums (Ö3 Austria) | 12 |
| Belgian Albums (Ultratop Flanders) | 166 |
| German Albums (Offizielle Top 100) | 7 |
| Scottish Albums (OCC) | 19 |
| Swiss Albums (Schweizer Hitparade) | 87 |
| UK Albums (OCC) | 36 |
| UK Rock & Metal Albums (OCC) | 3 |
| US Billboard 200 | 15 |
| US Top Alternative Albums (Billboard) | 3 |
| US Top Hard Rock Albums (Billboard) | 2 |
| US Top Rock Albums (Billboard) | 3 |

=== Year-end charts ===
Year-end chart performance for You're Welcome
| Chart (2021) | Position |
|---|---|
| US Top Rock Albums (Billboard) | 100 |
