= Stigma (Wage War album) =

Studio album by Wage War
- Released: June 21, 2024
- Genre: Metalcore
- Length: 31:02
- Label: Fearless
- Producers: Drew Fulk; Cody Quistad

Wage War chronology
Manic (2021)	Stigma (2024)	It Calls Me by Name (2026)

Singles from Stigma
- 1. "Magnetic" Released: March 21, 2024; 2. "Nail5" Released: April 12, 2024; 3. "Tombstone" Released: May 17, 2024; 4. "Blur" Released: June 21, 2024

Stigma is the fifth studio album by American metalcore band Wage War. The album was released on June 21, 2024, through Fearless Records and was produced by Drew Fulk. This is also the first album not featuring production contributions from Andrew Wade and Jeremy McKinnon.

== Release ==
On March 21, 2024, the band released the first single, "Magnetic". On April 12, the band released the second single "Nail5". On the same day, the band announced the album's title, release date, cover, and tracklist. The release date was set for June 21, 2024. On May 17, the band released the third single "Tombstone".

== Critical reception ==
Professional ratings
Review scores
Source	Rating
Blabbermouth.net	8/10
Distorted Sound Magazine	9/10
Dork	4/5 stars
Kerrang!	4/5 stars
Sputnikmusic	0.5/5
Wall of Sound	8/10

Stigma received mostly positive reviews from critics. Blabbermouth.net stated that "Wage War's evolution shows on "Stigma" with lead single "Magnetic". This is a soft, ethereal song, which is unusual for the band and gives a nod to contemporaries Bad Omens and Sleep Token. "Magnetic" has pop vocals, with heavy effects on Briton Bond's vocal lines, and rich guitars, making this a very pop-friendly song. It's also the most mainstream-sounding song these guys have released to date." Jake Richardson of Kerrang! stated that "The ominous, atmospheric dancehall vibes of opener The Show's About to Start quickly give way to the chunky riffs of guitarists Cody Quistad and Seth Blake, and from there on out, the band deliver 10 tracks of unrelenting metalcore might".

== Composition ==
Stigma has been described as metalcore with electronic, pop, and hip hop elements.

== Track listing ==
All tracks are written by Cody Quistad, with additional writers where noted.

Stigma track listing
No.	Title	Writer(s)	Length
1.	"The Show's About to Start"	Seth Blake; Chris Gaylord; Drew Fulk	3:17
2.	"Self Sacrifice"	Blake; Gaylord; Fulk	2:57
3.	"Magnetic"	Fulk	3:13
4.	"Nail5"	Blake; Gaylord; Fulk	2:34
5.	"Blur"	Devin Dawson; Kyle Fishman	3:02
6.	"Tombstone"	Blake; Gaylord; Fulk	2:58
7.	"Happy Hunting"	Fulk; Michael Whitworth	2:59
8.	"Hellbent"	Blake; Fulk; Mitchell Tenpenny; Whitworth	3:05
9.	"In My Blood"	Blake; Briton Bond; Gaylord; Fulk; Kellen McGregor	2:58
10.	"Is This How It Ends?"	Blake; Gaylord; Stephen Kluesener; Fulk	3:59
Total length:			31:02

== Personnel ==
Wage War

- Briton Bond – lead vocals
- Seth Blake – lead guitar, backing vocals
- Cody Quistad – rhythm guitar, clean vocals
- Chris Gaylord – bass guitar, backing vocals
- Stephen Kluesener – drums

Additional personnel

- Cody Quistad – production
- Drew Fulk – production
- Wage War – engineering
- Zakk Cervini – mixing
- Ted Jensen – mastering

== Charts ==
Chart performance for Stigma
Chart (2024)	Peak position
UK Album Downloads (Official Charts)	67
