= Blueprints (album) =

Studio album by Wage War
- Released: November 27, 2015
- Studios: Wade Studios, Orlando, Florida
- Genre: Metalcore
- Length: 38:58
- Label: Fearless
- Producers: Jeremy McKinnon; Andrew Wade

Wage War chronology
The Fall of Kings (2011)	Blueprints (2015)	Deadweight (2017)

Singles from Blueprints
- 1. "Alive" Released: June 15, 2015; 2. "Twenty One" Released: September 11, 2015; 3. "Youngblood" Released: October 23, 2015

Anniversary edition album cover
- Artwork used for the anniversary edition album cover.

Singles from Blueprints (Anniversary edition)
- 1. "Surrounded" Released: November 13, 2020

Blueprints is the debut studio album by American metalcore band Wage War. It was released on November 27, 2015, through Fearless Records. Prior to its release, the band had been through three name changes and an EP called The Fall of Kings when named Empires. On November 13, 2020, the band announced a vinyl re-release for December 4, 2020 including a brand new bonus track to celebrate the album's fifth anniversary. A digital version was released on November 27, 2020.

== Track listing ==
No.	Title	Length
1.	"Hollow"	1:08
2.	"Twenty One"	4:13
3.	"Alive"	3:24
4.	"Blueprints"	4:22
5.	"Youngblood"	4:02
6.	"The River"	3:48
7.	"Deadlocked"	3:55
8.	"Enemy"	3:58
9.	"Spineless"	2:00
10.	"Basic Hate"	3:40
11.	"Desperate"	4:24
Total length:		38:58

Anniversary Edition bonus tracks
No.	Title	Length
12.	"Surrounded"	3:30
Total length:		42:28

== Previously unreleased tracks ==
1. "The Aftermath"
2. "Maelstrom"*
3. "Parasite"*
4. "I Am the Messenger"*
5. "Honesty"*
- - recorded under the name Empires.

== Personnel ==
Credits adapted from AllMusic.

Wage War

- Briton Bond – unclean vocals
- Seth Blake – lead guitar, backing vocals tracks 2 and 8
- Cody Quistad – rhythm guitar, clean vocals
- Chris Gaylord – bass
- Stephen Kluesener – drums

Additional personnel

- Andrew Wade – composition, engineering, mixing, production
- Jeremy McKinnon – production, composition
- Alan Douches – mastering
- Matt Aure – product management
- Tom Denney – composition
- Sal Torres – A&R
- Chris Kutsor – layout design
- James Land – photography

== Charts ==
Chart (2015)	Peak position
US Top Heatseekers	3
US Top Rock Albums	43
US Top Hard Rock Albums	9
US Independent Albums	28
