= Deadweight (album) =

Studio album by Wage War
- Released: August 4, 2017
- Studios: Wade Studios, Orlando, Florida
- Genre: Metalcore
- Length: 39:52
- Label: Fearless
- Producers: Jeremy McKinnon; Andrew Wade

Wage War chronology
Blueprints (2015)	Deadweight (2017)	Pressure (2019)

Singles from Deadweight
- 1. "Stitch" Released: March 17, 2017; 2. "Don't Let Me Fade Away" Released: April 28, 2017; 3. "Witness" Released: July 6, 2017

Deadweight is the second studio album by American metalcore band Wage War. It was released on August 4, 2017, through Fearless Records. It is also the first album to have lead vocalist Briton Bond do clean vocals alongside Cody Quistad on the songs "Never Enough" and "Gravity".

== Critical reception ==
Professional ratings
Review scores
Source	Rating
Already Heard	3.5/5 stars
Dead Press!	6/10
Distorted Sound	5/10
KillYourStereo	65/100
Metal Hammer	4/5 stars
New Noise	5/5 stars
Rock Sound	8/10
Wall of Sound	8/10

The album received mostly positive reviews, but also mixed reviews from several critics. Already Heard rated the album 3.5 out of 5 and stated that "...is a well-made album with crossover appeal in the metalcore sub-genre." Zach Redrup from Dead Press! rated the album positively but saying that "...doesn't live up to its promise and is rendered a disappointment. However, despite not being able to take metalcore to the next level, they have more than enough potential to be a standout band in a sadly diluted pool and, with all things considered, that's not a particularly bad place to be." Distorted Sound scored the album 5 out of 10 and said: "In conclusion, therefore, Deadweight is by no means an album for those who are looking for something to turn the genre upside down. However, for fans of angry, chunky breakdowns and gym-session inducing metalcore, WAGE WAR have produced a record that will keep many of their fans happy." Owen Morawitz from KillYourStereo gave the album 65 out of 100 and said: "Deadweight is by no means a bad record. In fact, musically, tonally and lyrically, it's an above-average metalcore record. If you're new to the genre and happen to use bands like I Prevail and Blessthefall as your benchmark for guidelines, Wage War offer up something far more satisfying here on their second album. That said, if you've been around the metalcore block a time or two (like this reviewer), those looking for the above-mentioned originality in composition or execution will find very little here that's worth returning to. Still, 'Stitch' is such a rollicking good time, that it almost makes the entire thing worthwhile."

Metal Hammer gave the album a positive review and stated: "Overall, this slickly produced mix of unapologetically aggressive vocals, soaring choruses, crunchy riffs and effective breakdowns is authentic, emotional and strangely therapeutic." New Noise gave the album a perfect score 5 out of 5 and stated that "...with Deadweight, Wage War has carved out a niche that isn't going to become null and void or irrelevant any time soon. If you weren't paying attention to them before Deadweight, now is the time to." Rock Sound gave it 8 out of 10 and said: "Even if the interplay between Briton and guitarist / melodic vocalist Cody Quistad is hardly innovative, it might just be Wage War's trump card. They combine seamlessly throughout these 12 songs, bringing an emotional range to proceedings that so many of their peers lack." Wall of Sound gave the album 8/10 and saying: "Is this album as good as Blueprints? Only time will tell – Blueprints has the advantage of time, and the surprise of a new band that rocked that hard (plus the cough break in 'The River' is hard to beat). But Deadweight definitely holds its own, and has a legion of tracks which I'm keen to hear on their upcoming tour for sure."

== Track listing ==
No.	Title	Length
1.	"Two Years"	1:15
2.	"Southbound"	2:56
3.	"Don't Let Me Fade Away"	4:05
4.	"Stitch"	3:25
5.	"Witness"	3:53
6.	"Deadweight"	3:36
7.	"Gravity"	3:51
8.	"Never Enough"	3:11
9.	"Indestructible"	4:12
10.	"Disdain"	2:04
11.	"My Grave Is Mine to Dig"	3:26
12.	"Johnny Cash"	3:52
Total length:		39:52

Notes

- "Johnny Cash" and "Gravity" were later re-released as stripped-down versions in 2018. The stripped-down versions appear on the album, The Stripped Sessions.

== Personnel ==
Credits adapted from AllMusic.

Wage War

- Briton Bond – lead vocals
- Seth Blake – lead guitar, backing vocals
- Cody Quistad – rhythm guitar, clean vocals
- Chris Gaylord – bass, backing vocals
- Stephen Kluesener – drums

Additional personnel

- Andrew Wade – composition, engineering, mixing, production
- Jeremy McKinnon – production, composition
- Brad Blackwood – mastering

== Charts ==
Chart (2017)	Peak position
Australian Albums (ARIA)	45
UK Rock & Metal Albums (OCC)	15
US Billboard 200	54
US Top Rock Albums (Billboard)	8
US Top Hard Rock Albums (Billboard)	2
