= Pressure (Wage War album) =

Studio album by Wage War
- Released: August 30, 2019
- Genres: Metalcore; pop metal; post-hardcore; electropop
- Length: 41:41
- Label: Fearless
- Producers: Drew Fulk; Andrew Wade; Jeremy McKinnon

Wage War chronology
Deadweight (2017)	Pressure (2019)	Manic (2021)

Singles from Pressure
- 1. "Low" Released: January 9, 2019; 2. "Who I Am" Released: July 9, 2019; 3. "Prison" Released: July 30, 2019; 4. "Me Against Myself" Released: July 30, 2019

Pressure is the third studio album by American metalcore band Wage War. It was released on August 30, 2019, through Fearless Records. The album was produced by Drew Fulk, Andrew Wade and Jeremy McKinnon.

== Background and recording ==
About the album, its title, and the concept of pressure, the band stated: "Anytime you go into make a record, there's pressure. What you in that studio with those people affects the next however many years of your career and if you play your cards right, it can change your life. It really felt like a make or break situation. The 'Pressure' to make the perfect Wage War album, one that harvests what people have come to love about our band yet still grow and explore new territory and push ourselves harder than ever before."

"However, that's not the only pressure this album talks about. There are songs on the album that deal with mental health, and the pressure to act 'ok' even when things aren't. There are songs on the album that speaking of not succumbing to pressure and being just another face in the crowd, but more so making a change in yourself and the world around you. Being in a band, making music, playing shows in one way or another all comes with a 'Pressure' and how you deal with it is what determines who you are. This record is our response."

When asked about recording the album, Cody Quistad stated: "We were all out of our comfort zone, which was really cool, we couldn't just go home after the day. We all lived in the same house. It was a great opportunity for us to reconnect. We'd go to shows together, come back, and write at 2am. Los Angeles is inspiring, because there's a youthful drive and passion. Everyone is there to chase a dream. It gives you a mindset. You talk about going to L.A. to make a record when you're 13. It was a bucket list thing for us." "Low" was the first song to be completed after the release of Deadweight. "It started as most songs do with the main riff." The band recorded a demo of it while on Vans Warped Tour 2018.

"We went back to Andrew Wade and Jeremy McKinnon for the production and engineering side of things and were honored to have metal legend, Mark Lewis, mix it! The song went through many structure changes before landing on what it is today. 'Low' represents everything you've come to expect from Wage War, but in its most refined state."

== Promotion and release ==
On January 9, 2019, the band released a single titled "Low" through their label Fearless Records. Six months later, on July 9, they released a second single, "Who I Am". Then later that month, on July 30, the band released two singles, "Prison" and "Me Against Myself". In addition to the album news, the band announced a fall headlining tour. Kicking off September 27, just a few weeks after their Worcester Self Help Fest appearance, Wage War was on the road with Like Moths to Flames, Polaris, and Dayseeker in 2019.

== Critical reception ==
Professional ratings
Review scores
Source	Rating
Dead Press!	9/10
Exclaim!	3/10
Hysteria Magazine	9/10
KillYourStereo	45/100
New Noise	4/5 stars
Rock Sins	6/10
Wall of Sound	7/10

The album received mostly positive reviews, but also mixed reviews from several critics. Damon Taylor from Dead Press! rated the album positively and saying that "...Pressure pushes Wage War further than before to stunning results. Determined and streamlined, the record stands out from numerous releases from the band's contemporaries. With a make or break mentality behind them, Pressure could well be the record that thrusts Wage War further into the spotlight." Max Morin of Exclaim! gave it 3 out of 10 and said: "You can't fault Wage War for trying this; similar moves have worked wonders for Bring Me the Horizon and Bad Wolves. But a move this blatant after a monster of a record like Deadweight feels disingenuous. Pressure will undoubtedly be huge. The question of whether or not that's a good thing is open to debate." Hunter Hewgley from KillYourStereo gave the album 45 out of 100 and said: "To me, Pressure is a tragic event, as it is a huge missed opportunity for Wage War to create something unique for themselves. The good songs here are great, and you can tell that they could've made a great rock/metal album (or a shorter EP) with the new electronic additions. Instead, it all winds up as a confused, contrived, confidence-lacking mess that feels like it's reluctant to step too far away from its generic metalcore roots. A fantastic example of a band doing just that is Northlane and their masterful new record, Alien. With all the problems this new Wage War album has, the good songs ('Hurt', 'The Line') are still very much worth a listen. But it leaves me upset that I just cannot say that about the rest of the record. I also do strongly admire the fact that Wage War wished to push themselves in a different direction, and don't get me wrong, that's pretty damn cool. More bands should only be so bold in willing to change. But Pressure misses the mark entirely for a new, worthy change, instead leaving me with a void that not even a good breakdown can fill."

New Noise gave the album a 4 out of 5 and stated: "Compared to their last release, Pressure is a more memorable and impressionable record. Though there will be fans that dislike the focus shift in singing over screaming (and melodies over breakdowns), the transition sounds natural and almost necessary. Whatever your preference, it will hard to deny that the band has enhanced their skills since Deadweight, and that's what's really important here." Simon Crampton of Rock Sins rated the album 6 out of 10 and said: "Pressure isn't the world album you will hear this year. It's just insepid, uninspired and completely devoid of artistry, it will leave you cold and longing for something more." Wall of Sound gave the album 7/10 and saying: "Overall, Pressure is a solid effort that has a bunch of really good tracks, some okay tracks, and some not good tracks. The Florida boys teased us with two super heavy, and super great tracks and the album is definitely worth a listen, just don't expect to walk away from it feeling completely happy and satisfied with what's been delivered."

== Commercial performance ==
Loudwire named it one of the 50 best metal albums of 2019.

== Track listing ==
No.	Title	Length
1.	"Who I Am"	3:41
2.	"Prison"	2:48
3.	"Grave"	3:14
4.	"Ghost"	3:21
5.	"Me Against Myself"	3:57
6.	"Hurt"	3:15
7.	"Low"	3:47
8.	"The Line"	3:14
9.	"Fury"	3:19
10.	"Forget My Name"	3:22
11.	"Take the Fight"	3:38
12.	"Will We Ever Learn"	4:00
Total length:		41:41

Notes

- "Grave" has since been re-released as a stripped-down version in 2020. The stripped-down version has since been re-released for an album titled The Stripped Sessions also including "Me Against Myself", "Prison", and "Hurt".
- "Will We Ever Learn" also has stripped-down versions but remain unreleased officially. These arrangements are available on YouTube through various sources.

== Personnel ==
Credits adapted from AllMusic.

Wage War

- Briton Bond – lead vocals, additional guitar on "Hurt"
- Seth Blake – lead guitar, backing vocals
- Cody Quistad – rhythm guitar, clean vocals
- Chris Gaylord – bass, backing vocals
- Stephen Kluesener – drums

Additional personnel

- Drew Fulk – composition, engineering, mixing, mastering, production
- Andrew Wade – production, engineering ("Low")
- Jeremy McKinnon – production, engineering ("Low")
- Jeff Dunne – engineering, mixing, mastering
- Andy Serrao – A&R
- Jim Hughes – artwork, package design
- Travis Shinn – photography

== Charts ==
Chart (2019)	Peak position
Australian Albums (ARIA)	67
Swiss Albums (Schweizer Hitparade)	78
UK Rock & Metal Albums (OCC)	14
US Billboard 200	112
US Top Rock Albums (Billboard)	16
US Top Hard Rock Albums (Billboard)	5
