= Manic (Wage War album) =

Studio album by Wage War
- Released: October 1, 2021
- Recorded: April 2020–July 2021
- Genres: Metalcore; hard rock
- Length: 35:38
- Label: Fearless
- Producers: Drew Fulk; Andrew Wade; Jeremy McKinnon; Cody Quistad

Wage War chronology
Pressure (2019)	Manic (2021)	Stigma (2024)

Singles from Manic
- 1. "High Horse" Released: August 6, 2021; 2. "Circle the Drain" Released: August 25, 2021; 3. "Teeth" Released: September 14, 2021; 4. "Godspeed" Released: June 28, 2022

Manic is the fourth studio album by American metalcore band Wage War. The album was released on October 1, 2021, through Fearless Records. It was produced by Drew Fulk, Andrew Wade, Jeremy McKinnon and Cody Quistad.

== Background and promotion ==
On April 8, 2020, while on their downtime during the period of self-isolation caused by COVID-19 pandemic, Wage War announced on Twitter that they were working on new material for their upcoming record. Along with the announcement, the band also teased a song and wrote: "Making the most of quarantine. #ww4"

On August 6, the band officially released the single "High Horse" along with its music video. On August 25, almost three weeks after the release of "High Horse", the band unveiled the second single "Circle the Drain". At the same time, the band revealed the album itself, the album cover, the track list, and release date. To promote the album, the band also announced that they will support I Prevail's rescheduled European tour along with Dream State in March 2022. On September 14, the band released the third single "Teeth".

During an interview, Cody Quistad revealed that Manic features "songs for the new fans and also the old, but then there's some brand new stuff that I feel like I've never heard bands do before."

== Critical reception ==
Professional ratings
Review scores
Source	Rating
Distorted Sound	8/10
Kerrang!	4/5 stars
Rock 'N' Load	9/10
Wall of Sound	7.5/10

The album received generally positive reviews from critics. Distorted Sound scored the album 8 out of 10 and said: "This release, Manic, is a roundup of what the band has felt for the past year and a half, saying that they effectively lost their jobs which obviously came with a lot of frustration. Pairing this with the desire to try out new things with their sound, the results are an album that's well worth your attention." Kerrang! gave the album 4 out of 5 and stated: "It's not a perfect album, and it won't please every fan, but Manic represents a new step forward and when it hits home it absolutely slays. Get ready to Wage War once more." Rock 'N' Load praised the album saying, "Overall, this album is solid, it showcases what Wage War are all about and the progression from their prior albums. Whilst there is nothing new and ground-breaking, it's an impressive showing from the Florida based Quintet and one I'll be listening to after finishing this review." Adam Rice of Wall of Sound gave the album the score 7.5/10, writing: "In my opinion, this isn't Wage War's finest work. It definitely has its moments and had me on the edge of my seat in some songs but there are a few too many skip-worthy tracks that unfortunately dull the shine that Manic had the potential to offer. However, I do encourage everyone to give it a chance and to come up with their own conclusion."

== Track listing ==
All lyrics are written by Wage War; all music is composed by Wage War.

Manic track listing
No.	Title	Length
1.	"Relapse"	2:59
2.	"Teeth"	3:08
3.	"Manic"	2:44
4.	"High Horse"	2:48
5.	"Circle the Drain"	3:35
6.	"Godspeed"	3:06
7.	"Death Roll"	3:01
8.	"Slow Burn"	3:09
9.	"Never Said Goodbye"	3:19
10.	"True Colors"	3:09
11.	"If Tomorrow Never Comes"	4:40
Total length:		35:38

Notes

- "Circle the Drain", "Slow Burn", "Never Said Goodbye", and "Godspeed" all were re-released as stripped versions for an album titled The Stripped Sessions. A cover of Folsom Prison Blues was also recorded during the Manic sessions and was also released on The Stripped Sessions.

== Personnel ==
Wage War

- Briton Bond – lead vocals, additional guitars
- Seth Blake – lead guitar, backing vocals
- Cody Quistad – rhythm guitar, clean vocals
- Chris Gaylord – bass, backing vocals
- Stephen Kluesener – drums

Additional personnel

- Cody Quistad – production, engineering
- Drew Fulk – production, engineering, mixing, mastering
- Andrew Wade – production, engineering
- Jeremy McKinnon – production
- Jeff Dunne – engineering, mixing, mastering

== Charts ==
Chart performance for Manic
Chart (2021)	Peak position
Australian Albums (ARIA)	76
UK Rock & Metal Albums (Official Charts)	18
US Top Hard Rock Albums (Billboard)	16
