= Drew Fulk =

American songwriter and producer

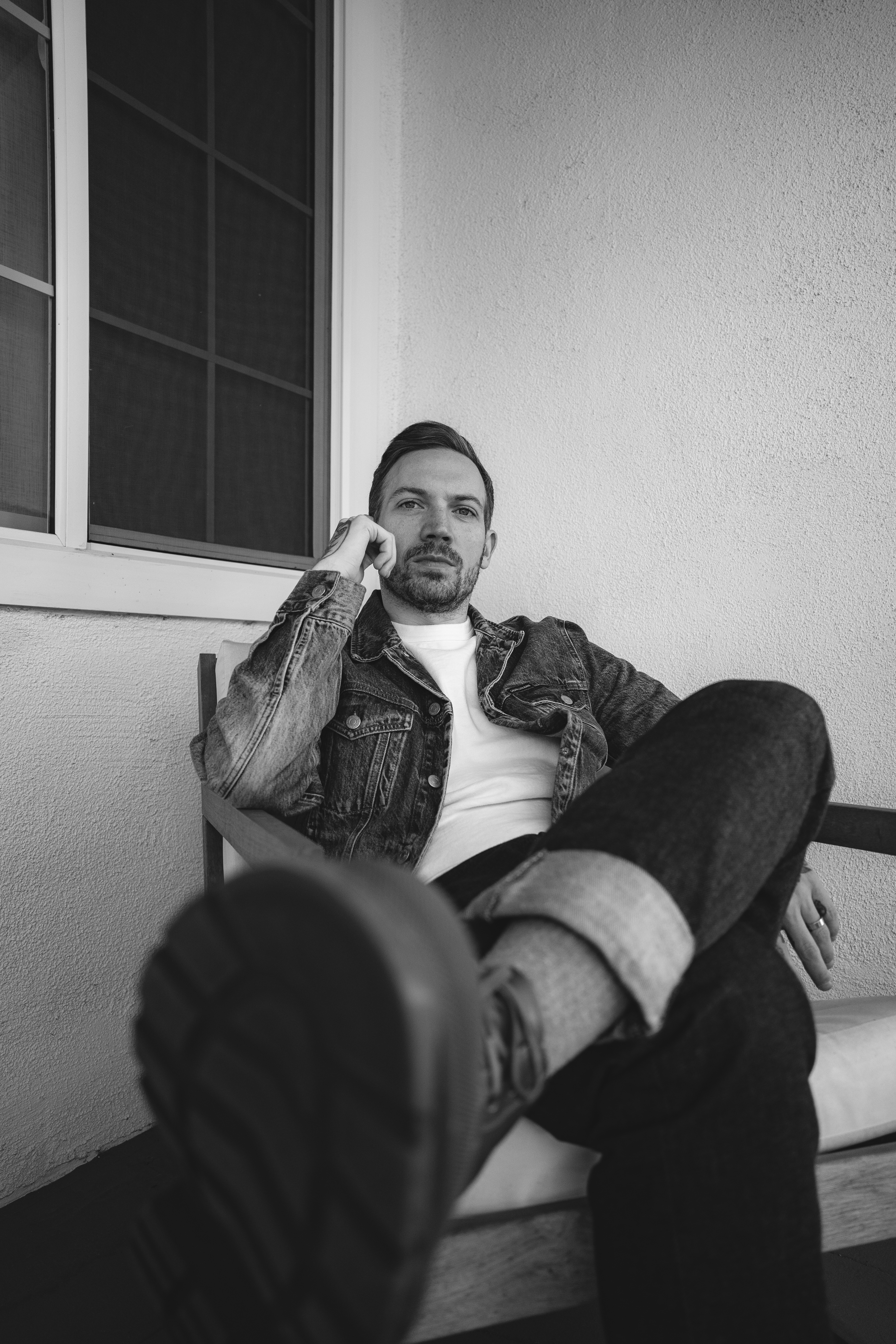
- Fulk in 2024

Background information
- Also known as: Wzrd Bld
- Born: May 1, 1987 (age 39); Kernersville, North Carolina, U.S.
- Genres: Metalcore; alternative rock; hip hop
- Occupations: Record producer; songwriter
- Years active: 2008–present
- Website: inthecutpublishing.com

Drew Fulk (born May 1, 1987), also known as Wzrd Bld, is an American producer and songwriter based in Los Angeles, California. He has worked with artists such as Twenty One Pilots, Knocked Loose, Lil Peep, HEALTH, A Day To Remember, Lil Wayne, Motionless In White, Five Finger Death Punch and Disturbed and has over twenty No. 1 Billboard Rock Songs to his name. He also runs his own publishing company, In the Cut Publishing, through APG.

== Career ==
=== Early years ===
Fulk was born in Kernersville, North Carolina and moved to Los Angeles in December 2014 where he started to work under the moniker "WZRD BLD" (pronounced "Wizard Blood") working with artists such as Ice Nine Kills, Bullet for My Valentine, Fit for a King, Yelawolf, Moon Taxi and I Prevail. In 2018, he had his first No. 1 rock song with Pop Evil's lead single "Waking Lions".

=== 2019–present ===
In mid-2019, Fulk started his own publishing company, In the Cut Publishing, through BMG, aimed at signing rock-focused writers and producers. In late 2021, he left BMG and signed a publishing deal with Mike Caren's publishing company, APG to which In The Cut was moved to as well. In October 2022, he had his tenth #1 Billboard US Mainstream Rock Radio song with Motionless in White's single "Masterpiece". He has been working with artists such as Disturbed, Knocked Loose, Kim Dracula, A Day to Remember and Papa Roach. He frequently collaborates with engineer and mixer Jeff Dunne on his projects. In addition to his production and songwriting work, Fulk has contributed to music-production education, appearing on the Nail the Mix platform as a guest instructor, teaching a mixing class centered on Emmure’s album Flag of the Beast.

== Awards and certifications ==
=== Grammy Awards ===
In November 2023, Fulk was nominated for a Grammy as the producer and co-writer of Disturbed's single, "Bad Man", for Best Metal Performance of the year.

In November 2024, Fulk was nominated for a Grammy as the producer of Knocked Loose's single "Suffocate" featuring Poppy, for Best Metal Performance of the year.

== Selected discography ==
Year	Artist	Album title	Label	Credits
2012	Motionless in White	Infamous	Fearless	Writing "Devil's Night"
2014	Motionless in White	Reincarnate	Fearless	Writing "Reincarnate"
2016
2016	Crown the Empire	Retrograde	Rise	Production, Mixing, Writing
2016	I Prevail	Lifelines	Fearless	Additional Production, Writing
2017	Emmure	Look at Yourself	SharpTone Records	Production, Mixing, Writing
2017	Motionless in White	Graveyard Shift	Roadrunner	Production, Writing
2017	Miss May I	Shadows Inside	SharpTone	Production, Engineering
2017	We Came as Romans	Cold Like War	SharpTone	Production, Mixing, Writing
2017	Void of Vision	Disturbia (EP)	UNFD	Production, Mixing, Mastering
2018	Pop Evil	Pop Evil	eOne Records	Writing "Waking Lions"
2018	The Plot in You	Dispose	Fearless	Production, Mixing
2018	Bad Wolves	Disobey	Better Noise Music	Writing "Remember When"
2018	Bullet for My Valentine	Gravity	Spinefarm	Writing "Not Dead Yet", "Coma"
2018	Chelsea Grin	Eternal Nightmare	Rise	Production, Mixing, Writing
2018	I Dont Know How but They Found Me	"Do It All the Time"	Fearless	Production, Writing
2018	Fit for a King	Dark Skies	Solid State Records	Production, Mixing, Writing
2018	Beartooth	Disease	Red Bull Records	Writing "You Never Know"
2018	Ice Nine Kills	The Silver Scream	Fearless	Production, Mixing, Writing
2018	I Dont Know How but They Found Me	1981 Extended Play	Fearless	Production, Writing "Do It All The Time"
2018	Lil Peep	Come Over When You're Sober, Pt. 2	Columbia Records	Writing "Runaway", "Sex With My Ex", "Fingers"
2018	Crystal Lake	Helix	Cube Records, SharpTone	Mixing, Mastering
2019	Motionless in White	Disguise	Roadrunner	Production, Mixing, Writing
2019	Northlane	Alien	UNFD	Production "Vultures"
2019	Wage War	Pressure	Fearless	Production, Mixing, Writing
2019	As I Lay Dying	Shaped by Fire	Nuclear Blast	Production "My Own Grave"
2019	Bad Wolves	N.A.T.I.O.N.	Better Noise	Production, Writing "Killing Me Slowly", "Sober"
2019	Lil Wayne	Ethika RGB3 Mixtape	Ethika, Inc.	Production "Sleepless"
2020	Dance Gavin Dance	Afterburner	Rise	Production
2020	Make Them Suffer	How to Survive a Funeral	Rise, Greyscale	Production, Engineering, Mixing, Mastering, Writing
2020	Emmure	Hindsight	SharpTone	Production, Mixing, Writing
2020	Crystal Lake	"Watch Me Burn"	SharpTone	Mixing
2020	Fit for a King	The Path	Solid State	Production, Engineering, Writing
2020	Fever 333	Wrong Generation (EP)	Roadrunner, 333 Wreckords Crew	Production, Writing "Bite Black"
2021	A Day to Remember	You're Welcome	Fueled By Ramen	Writing "Bloodsucker"
2021	Ayron Jones	Child of the State	Big Machine Records, John Varvatos Records	Production, Writing "Free"
2021	Pop Evil	Versatile	eOne	Production, Mixing, Writing "Breath Again"
2021	Wage War	Manic	Fearless	Production, Mixing, Writing
2021	Ice Nine Kills	The Silver Scream 2: Welcome to Horrorwood	Fearless	Production, Mixing, Writing
2022	Papa Roach	Ego Trip	New Noize, ADA	Production, Writing "Kill The Noise"
2022	Illenium feat. Spiritbox	Shivering	Warner Records	Writing
2022	Motionless in White	Scoring the End of the World	Roadrunner	Production, Writing
2022	Pale Waves	Unwanted	Dirty Hit	Writing, Guitar "Clean", "You're So Vain"
2022	Highly Suspect	The Midnight Demon Club	Roadrunner	Production, Writing
2022	We Came as Romans	Darkbloom	SharpTone	Production, Mixing, Writing
2022	Fit for a King	The Hell We Create	Solid State	Production, Engineering, Mixing, Mastering
2022	Disturbed	Divisive	Reprise Records	Production, Mixing
2023	Kevin Gates	Breakfast	Bread Winner Alumni	Production
2023	NLE Choppa, Nardo Wick	Fast X	APG, UMG	Production "Steppers"
2023	Knocked Loose	Upon Loss Singles	Pure Noise	Production, Mixing
2023	Kim Dracula	A Gradual Decline In Morale	Columbia	Production, Mixing, Writing
2023	Beartooth	The Surface	Red Bull	Writing "I Was Alive", "What Are You Waiting For?"
2023	Corpse	Disdain	Self-released	Production
2024	Knocked Loose	You Won't Go Before You're Supposed To	Pure Noise	Production, Mixing
2024	Wage War	Stigma	Fearless Records	Production, Engineering, Writing
2024	Ice Nine Kills	"A Work of Art"	Fearless Records	Production, Engineering, Writing
2024	Nothing More	Carnal	Better Noise	Production, Mixing, Writing
2025	Papa Roach	Even If It Kills Me	New Noize, ADA	Production, Engineering, Writing
2025	Whitechapel	Hymns in Dissonance	Metal Blade Records	Mixing
2025	A Day To Remember	Big Ole Album Vol. 1	Fueled By Ramen	Production, Writing
2025	Babymetal ft. Spiritbox	Metal Forth	Capitol Records	Production, Writing "My Queen"
2025	Bailey Zimmerman	Different Night Same Rodeo	Atlantic Records	Writing "Yours For The Breaking"
2025	Twenty One Pilots	Breach	Atlantic Records	Writing, Additional Production "Tally"
2025	Health	Conflict DLC	Loma Vista	Mixing
2026	Knocked Loose ft. Denzel Curry	Hive Mind	Pure Noise Records	Production, Mixing
2026	Boundaries	Yearning: The Unbeautiful After	Sumerian Records	Production, Writing, Mixing
2026	Motionless in White	Decades	Roadrunner	Production, Writing
2026	Five Finger Death Punch	Legacy	Better Noise	Production, Writing, Mixing
2026	In This Moment	Witch	Better Noise	Production, Writing
2026	Kim Dracula	Molecular Conversion	Rise Records	Production, Writing
2026	Imminence	Axis Mundi	Sumerian Records	Production
