= Jeremy McKinnon =

American singer

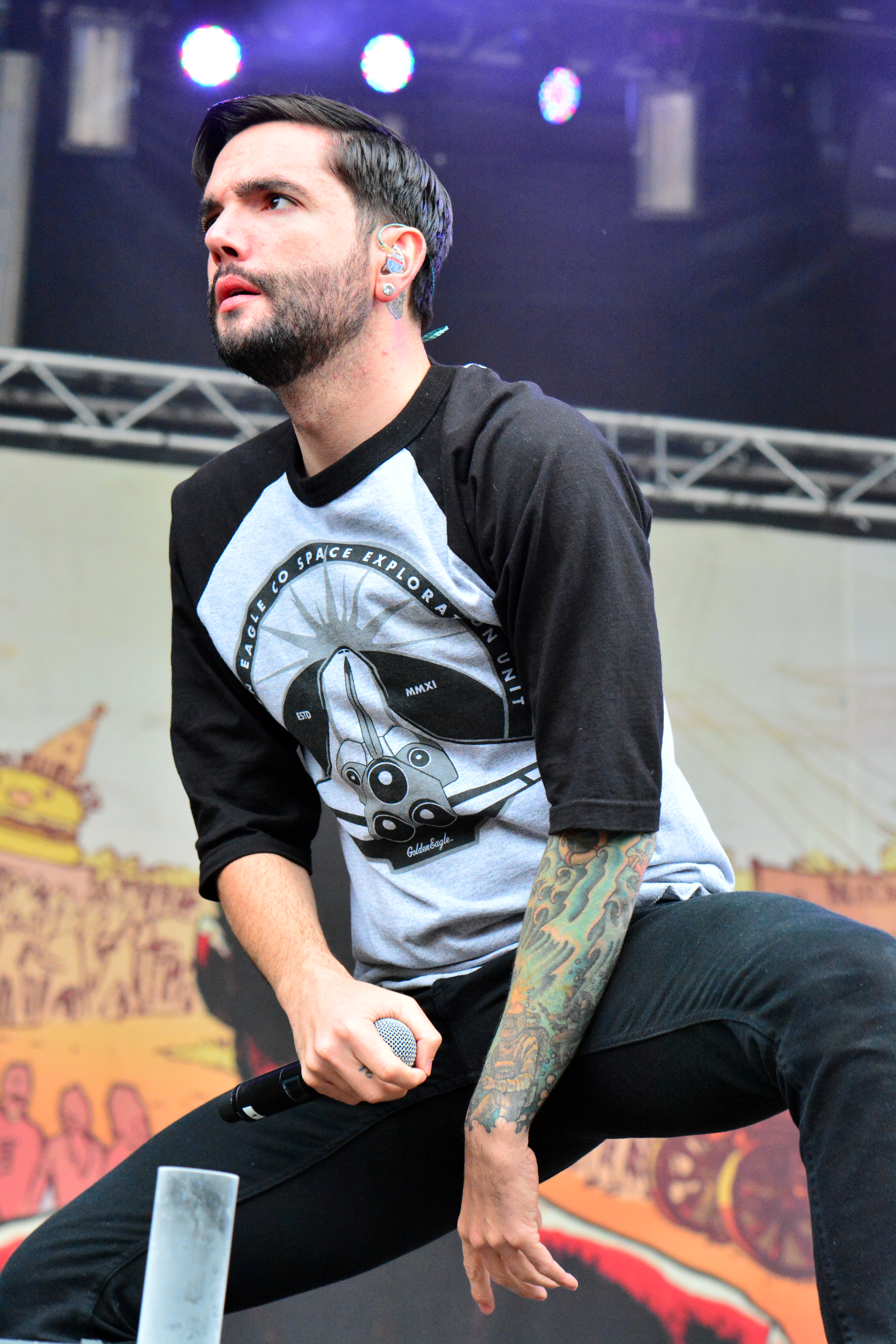
- McKinnon in 2014

Background information
- Born: Jeremy Wade McKinnon; December 17, 1985 (age 40); Gainesville, Florida, U.S.
- Origin: Ocala, Florida, U.S.
- Genres: Metalcore; pop-punk; post-hardcore; alternative rock
- Occupations: Singer; record producer; songwriter
- Instrument: Vocals
- Years active: 2002–present
- Member of: A Day to Remember

Jeremy Wade McKinnon (born December 17, 1985) is an American singer and record producer. He is a founding member and lead vocalist of the rock band A Day to Remember. He has produced albums for The Ghost Inside, Neck Deep, and Wage War.

== Biography ==
Jeremy McKinnon was raised in Ocala, Florida, and grew up with two sisters. His parents are originally from Brooklyn, and he is of Irish and Italian descent. McKinnon first got a job at Boston Market and later went on to do construction work. McKinnon's interest in music came as a result of hanging out with a friend's band. McKinnon was inspired to write and play heavy music by a local band, Seventh Star. (Note: The band's bassist was Drew Russ, who would later become A Day to Remember's video editor.) McKinnon often got into trouble during high school in and as a result he would write music. McKinnon's first band was the ska band All for Nothing, before joining guitarist Tom Denney and drummer Bobby Scruggs to form A Day to Remember.

McKinnon and A Day to Remember bassist Joshua Woodard have formed their own record label, Running Man, in partnership with Epitaph.

On December 25, 2016, McKinnon married his long-time girlfriend, Stephanie Morrison. On December 5, 2017, McKinnon and his wife announced the arrival of their first child, a daughter.

== Influences ==
McKinnon cites punk rock band Millencolin as his biggest musical influence, and cites ska punk band Less Than Jake for his influences on the stage: "They were having fun during the concert, they were not super serious. But they were not so goofy so as to appear ridiculous. Simply, they created a great atmosphere, and I've always loved this. Then I saw the Flaming Lips, and Rammstein in Germany, and that was the craziest concert I've ever seen. I'm just trying to combine and put into practice all the amazing things that I've loved over the years."

== Discography ==
With All for Nothing

- How to Score in High School (2002)

With A Day to Remember

- And Their Name Was Treason (2005)
- For Those Who Have Heart (2007)
- Homesick (2009)
- What Separates Me from You (2010)
- Common Courtesy (2013)
- Bad Vibrations (2016)
- You're Welcome (2021)
- Big Ole Album Vol. 1 (2025)

=== Guest appearances ===
| Band | Album | Song |
|---|---|---|
| In Fear and Faith | Your World on Fire | "Strength in Numbers" |
| For the Fallen Dreams | Relentless | "Nightmares" |
| Pierce the Veil | Selfish Machines | "Caraphernelia" |
| Mest | Not What You Expected | "Radio (Something to Believe)" |
| The Ghost Inside | Get What You Give | "Dark Horse" |
| August Burns Red | Found in Far Away Places | "Ghosts" |
| Neck Deep | Life's Not out to Get You | "Kali Ma" |
| League of Legends | Non-album single | "Take Over" |
| Hardy | The Mockingbird & the Crow | "Radio Song" |
| Bilmuri | Kinda Hard | "ALWAYS LET YOU DOWN" |

=== Production discography ===
| Band | Album | Release year |
|---|---|---|
| Veara | What We Left Behind | 2010 |
| A Day to Remember | What Separates Me from You | 2010 |
| The Ghost Inside | Get What You Give | 2012 |
| A Day to Remember | Common Courtesy | 2013 |
| The Ghost Inside | Dear Youth | 2014 |
| Neck Deep | Life's Not out to Get You | 2015 |
| Wage War | Blueprints | 2015 |
| Wage War | Deadweight | 2017 |
| Wage War | Pressure | 2019 |
| The Ghost Inside | The Ghost Inside | 2020 |
| A Day to Remember | You're Welcome | 2021 |
| Wage War | Manic | 2021 |
