= Wage War =

American metalcore band

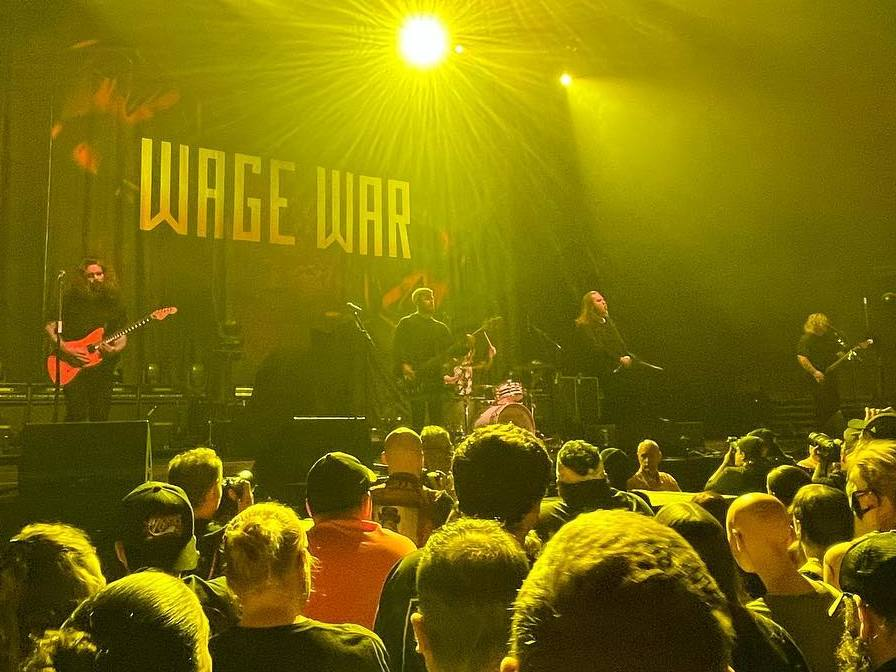
- Wage War performing in 2022

Background information
- Also known as: Empires; War Within
- Origin: Ocala, Florida, U.S.
- Genres: Metalcore; melodic metalcore; hard rock; post-hardcore
- Works: Wage War discography
- Years active: 2010–present
- Label: Fearless
- Members: Seth Blake; Briton Bond; Cody Quistad; Chris Gaylord; Stephen Kluesener
- Past members: Jordan Pierce; David Rau
- Website: wagewarband.com

Wage War is an American metalcore band formed in Ocala, Florida in 2010 under the name Empires. The band consists of lead vocalist Briton Bond, lead guitarist Seth Blake, rhythm guitarist and clean vocalist Cody Quistad, bassist Chris Gaylord, and drummer Stephen Kluesener.

The band has released six studio albums and two extended plays. The band self-released their first EP and only independent release, The Fall of Kings in 2011. In 2015, the band signed to Fearless Records. The band released their first studio album, Blueprints, on November 27, 2015. Their second studio album Deadweight was released on August 4, 2017. Their third studio album, Pressure, was released on August 30, 2019. Their fourth studio album, Manic, was released on October 1, 2021. Their fifth studio album, Stigma, was released on June 21, 2024. Their second EP, It Calls Me by Name was released on April 17, 2026. Their sixth studio album, Landfall, was released on October 9, 2026.

== History ==
=== Formation, line-up change and Blueprints (2010–2016) ===
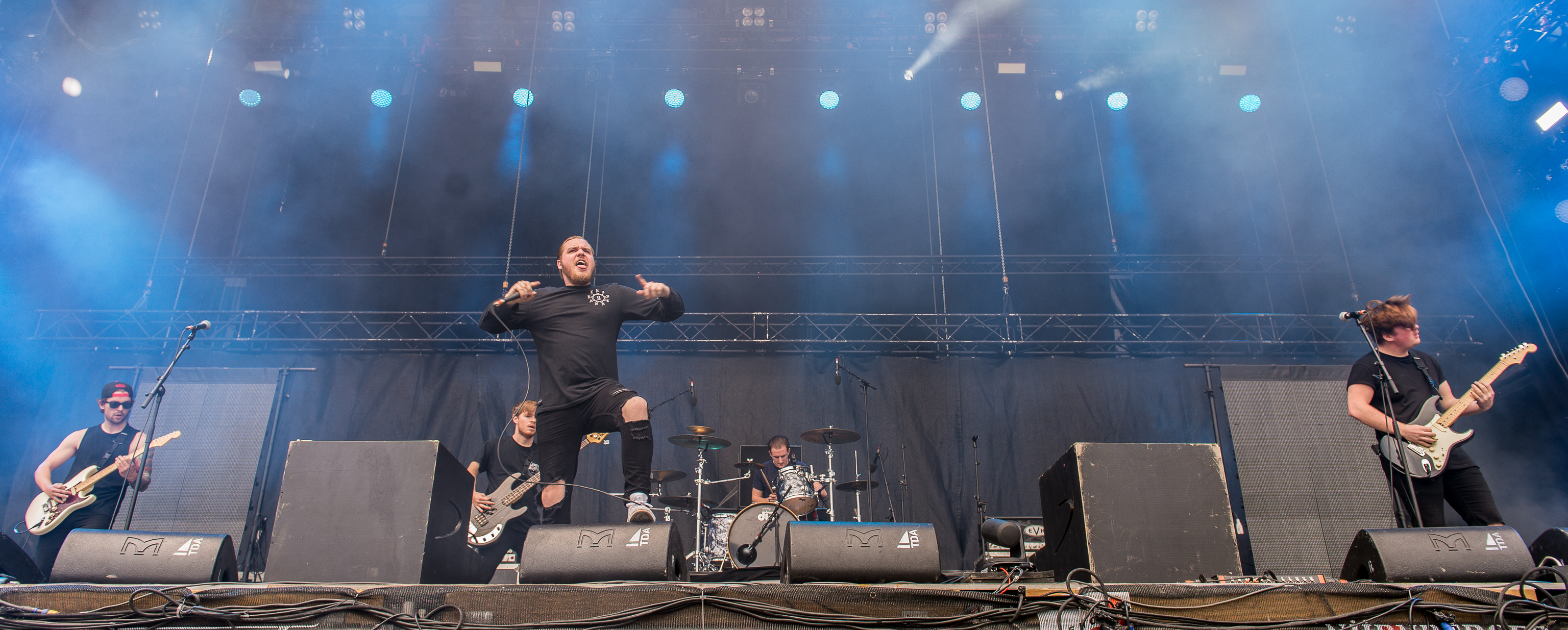
Wage War performing at Rock im Park in 2016

Wage War started in 2010 under the name "Empires" in Ocala, Florida. The band originally consisted of Briton Bond (unclean vocals), Cody Quistad (rhythm guitar/clean vocals), Seth Blake (lead guitar), Jordan Pierce (bass) and David Rau (drums). Rau quit the band to focus on teaching and was previously residing as a teacher at West Port High School in the band's hometown. The band briefly changed their name to War Within before changing it again to Wage War. Since the name change to Wage War, the band hired on Chris Gaylord to replace Pierce and Stephen J. Kluesener to replace Rau. As of October 2019, Rau occasionally fills in for Kluesener. In 2015, the band signed to Fearless Records, with a single produced by Jeremy McKinnon and Andrew Wade. After being signed to Fearless, the band released their debut album, Blueprints.

=== Deadweight (2017–2018) ===
Their second album Deadweight was released with Fearless Records on August 4, 2017. Wage War has done a number of tours, including playing on the entirety of the Vans Warped Tour in 2016, and A Day to Remember's Self Help Festival in 2017. The band has also opened for artists such as August Burns Red, Chelsea Grin, I Prevail, The Amity Affliction, Northlane, Every Time I Die, For Today, Of Mice & Men and Disturbed. The band played with Parkway Drive on their mini-June 2017 tour. The band embarked on their first national headliner in the July 2017, in support of their new album Deadweight. Gideon and Varials joined up as support. The second leg of the tour featured Gideon and Varials once again. Oceans Ate Alaska and Loathe joined up as support. Wage War played on the final touring portion of the 2018 Vans Warped Tour.

=== Pressure (2019–2020) ===
On January 9, 2019, the band released a single titled "Low" through their label Fearless Records. Six months later, on July 9, they released a second single, "Who I Am". Then later that month, on July 30, the band released two singles, "Prison" and "Me Against Myself". Upon doing this, the band unveiled their plans for a third studio album, revealing the album's title, tracklist, and release date. Pressure, their third album, was released on August 30, 2019.

On March 18, Wage War lost all of their Myspace content from 2016 and earlier in "a server migration gone wrong" from the Empires era (with the exception of The Fall of Kings EP). It was widely reported that over 50 million songs and 12 years worth of content was permanently lost, and there was no backup. Wage War played on the 25th Anniversary Vans Warped Tour in Atlantic City, New Jersey and in Mountain View, California. The band went on tour throughout the Fall of 2019, in support of their latest album, Pressure. Like Moths to Flames, Polaris and Dayseeker joined up as support for the tour. On November 13, 2020, the band dropped a new song called "Surrounded", a previously unreleased track from Blueprints, which harks back to their heavier beginnings.

=== Manic (2020–2023) ===
On April 8, 2020, during the period of self-isolation caused by COVID-19 pandemic, Wage War announced on Twitter that they were working on new material for the upcoming record. Along with the announcement, the band also teased a new song and wrote: "Making the most of quarantine. #ww4"

On August 6, 2021, the band released a song called "High Horse". On August 25, the band officially released the second single "Circle the Drain" from their fourth studio album, Manic, which was released on October 1, 2021. At the same time, the band revealed the album cover and the tracklist. To promote the album, the band also announced that they will support I Prevail's rescheduled European tour along with Dream State in March 2022. On September 14, the band released the third single "Teeth". On November 18, 2022, the band announced an acoustic album called The Stripped Sessions, which was released on December 2, 2022.

=== Stigma (2024–2025) ===
On March 21, 2024, Wage War unveiled the first single titled "Magnetic" and its corresponding music video. On April 12, the band premiered the second single "Nail5" and an accompanying music video along with the album cover and track list. On May 17, the band released the third and final single "Tombstone". Stigma was released digitally on June 21, and physically on September 6, 2024.

=== It Calls Me by Name EP and Landfall (2026–present) ===
On February 24, 2026, Wage War released "Song of the Swamp", the lead single from the EP It Calls Me by Name. The EP released on April 17. The band promoted the EP with 21-date US tour from April 28 to May 31 supported by Nevertel and Orthodox. On August 14, Wage War released the single "Sweet Dreams". On September 4, the band announced their sixth studio album, Landfall, scheduled for release October 9, 2026, and released the title track as a single. On October 5, the album's fifth single, "God Complex", was released.

== Musical style ==
Wage War's musical style has been described as metalcore, melodic metalcore, hard rock, post-hardcore, and melodic hardcore. The band also has also delved into or has used elements of alternative metal, nu metal, djent, rap metal, electronic, industrial, pop, pop rock, and hip hop.

Wage War have cited influences including Architects, Lamb of God, Pantera, Metallica, Gojira, Rob Zombie, Static X, Nickelback, Johnny Cash, Hank Williams Jr., Allan Jackson and George Strait.

== Band members ==
Wage War live at Rock im Park 2016

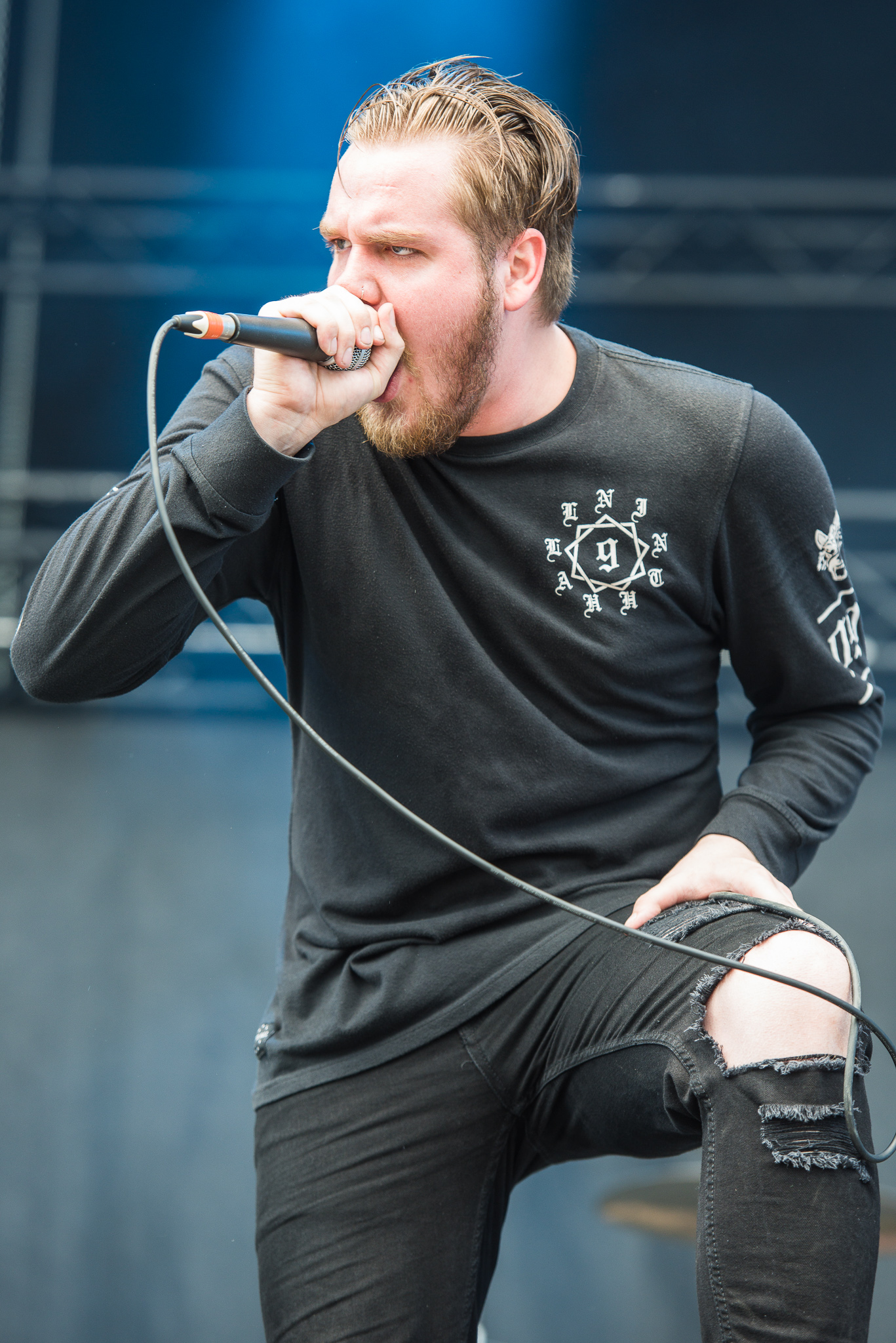
Lead vocalist Briton Bond

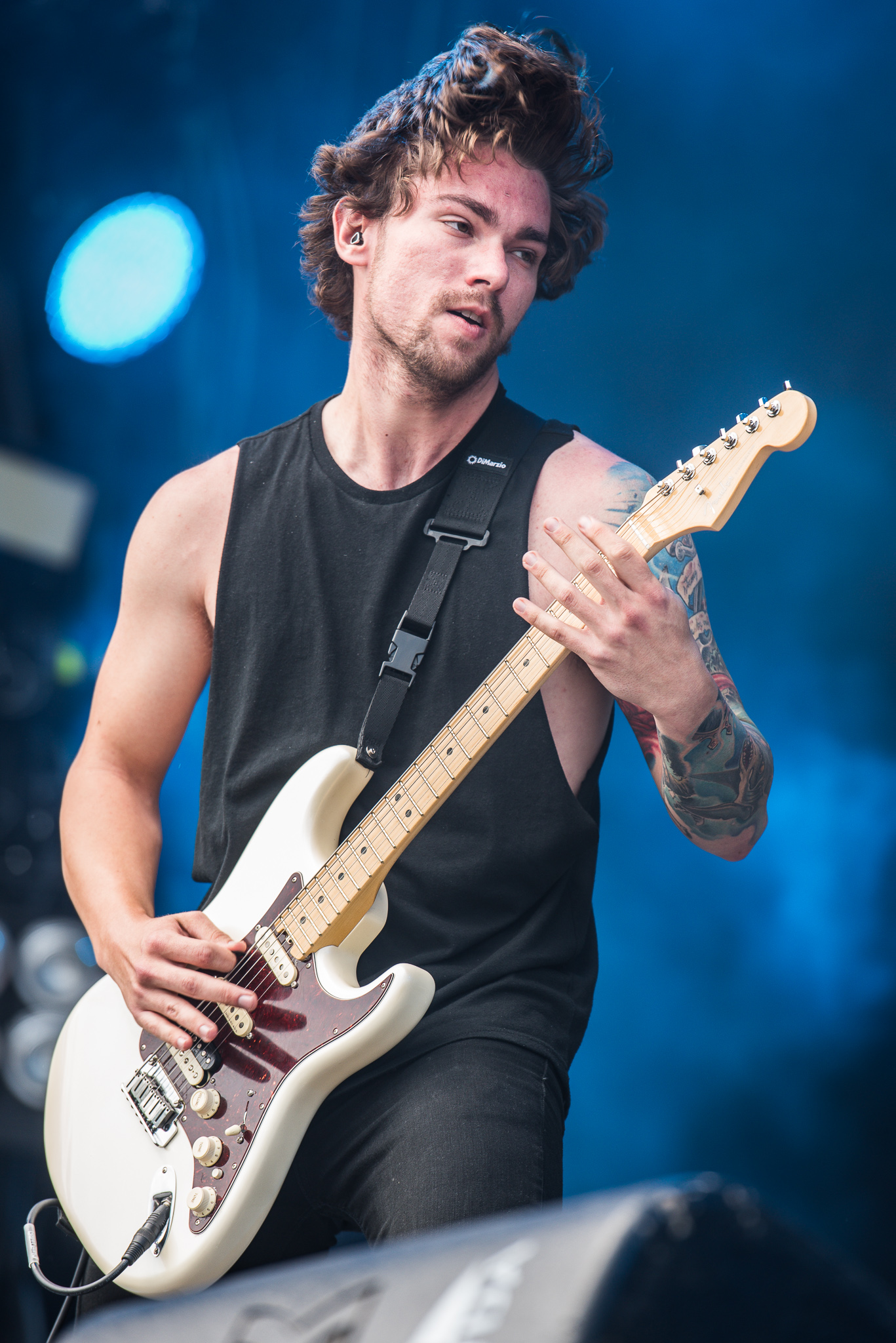
Lead guitarist Seth Blake

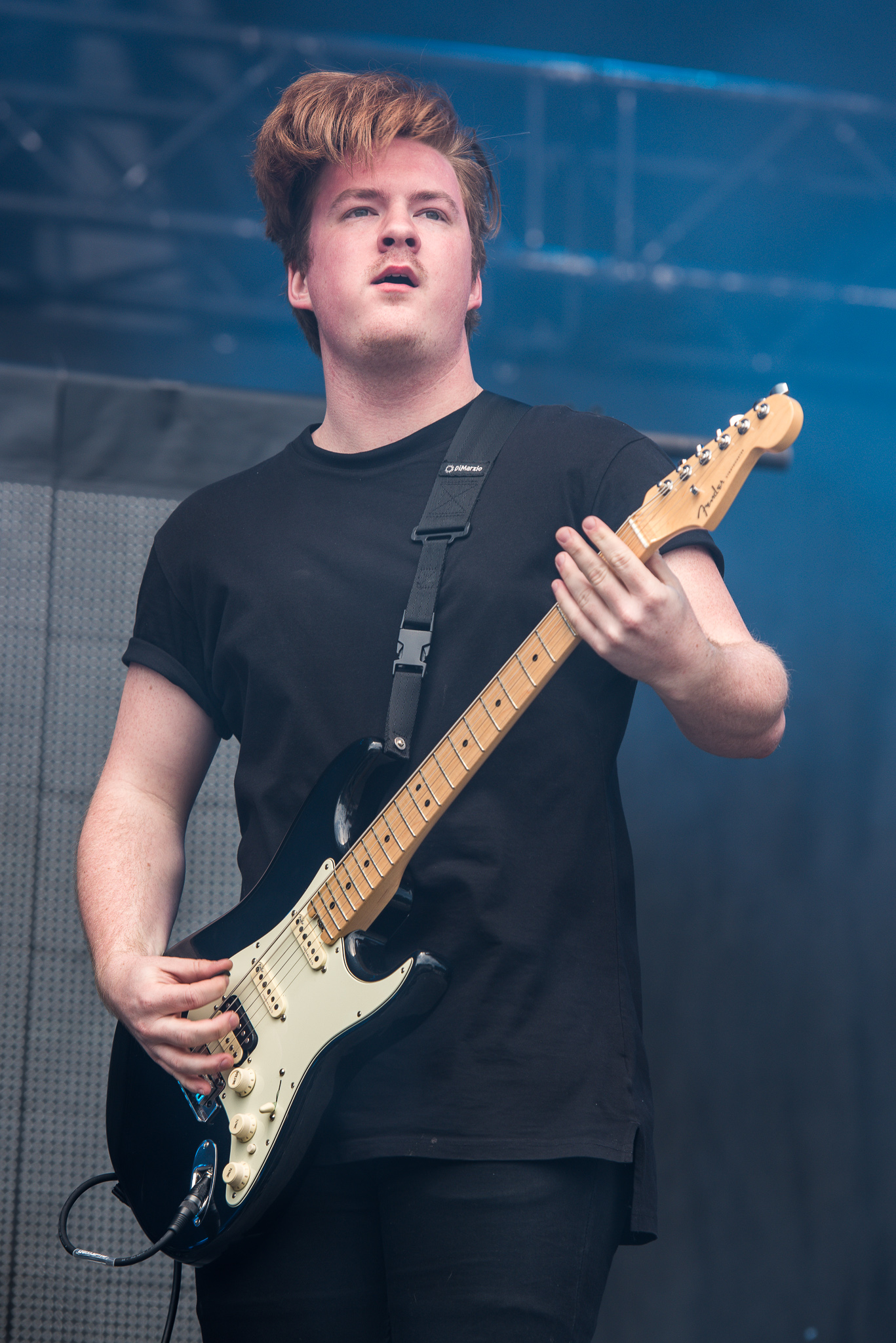
Rhythm guitarist Cody Quistad

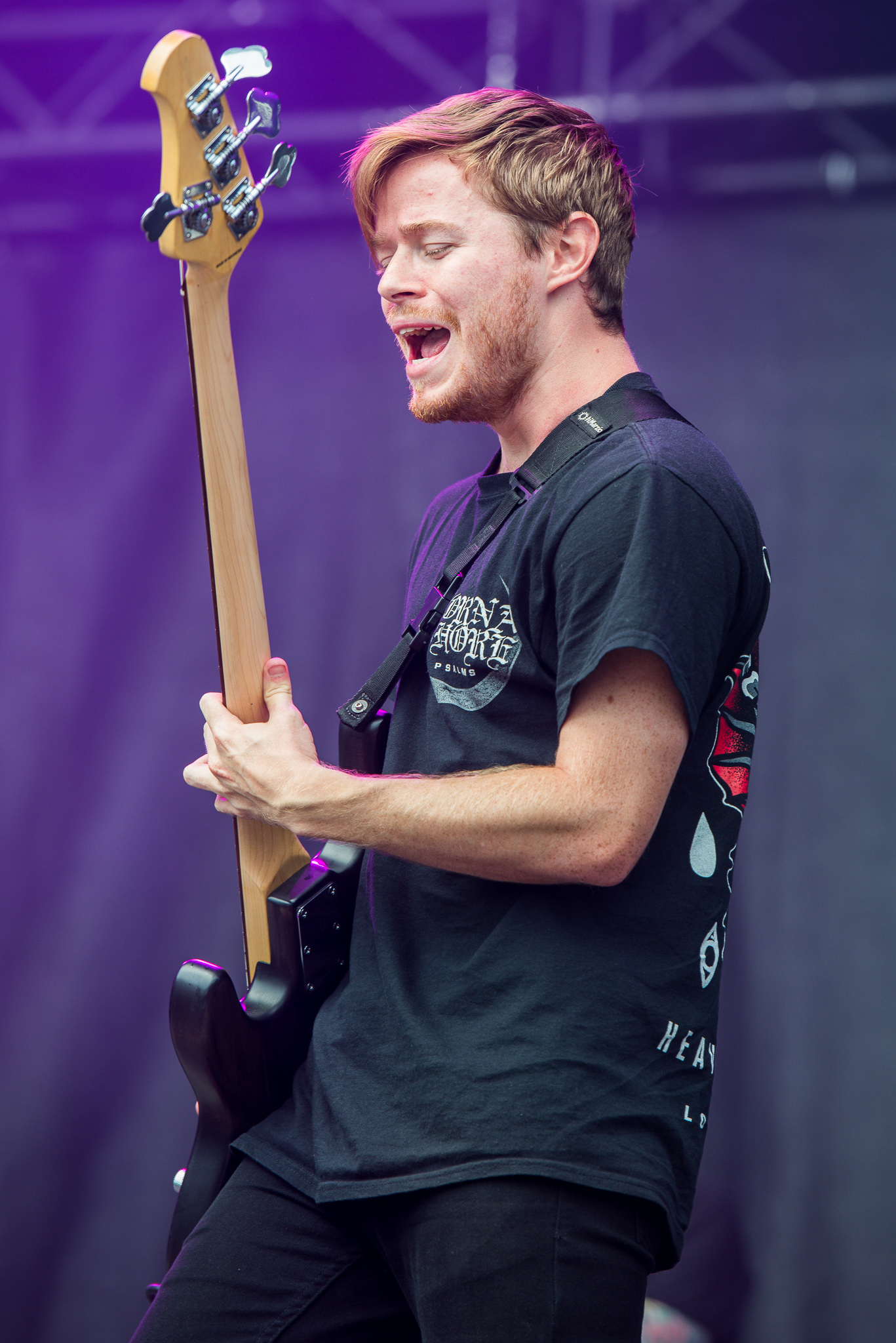
Bassist Chris Gaylord

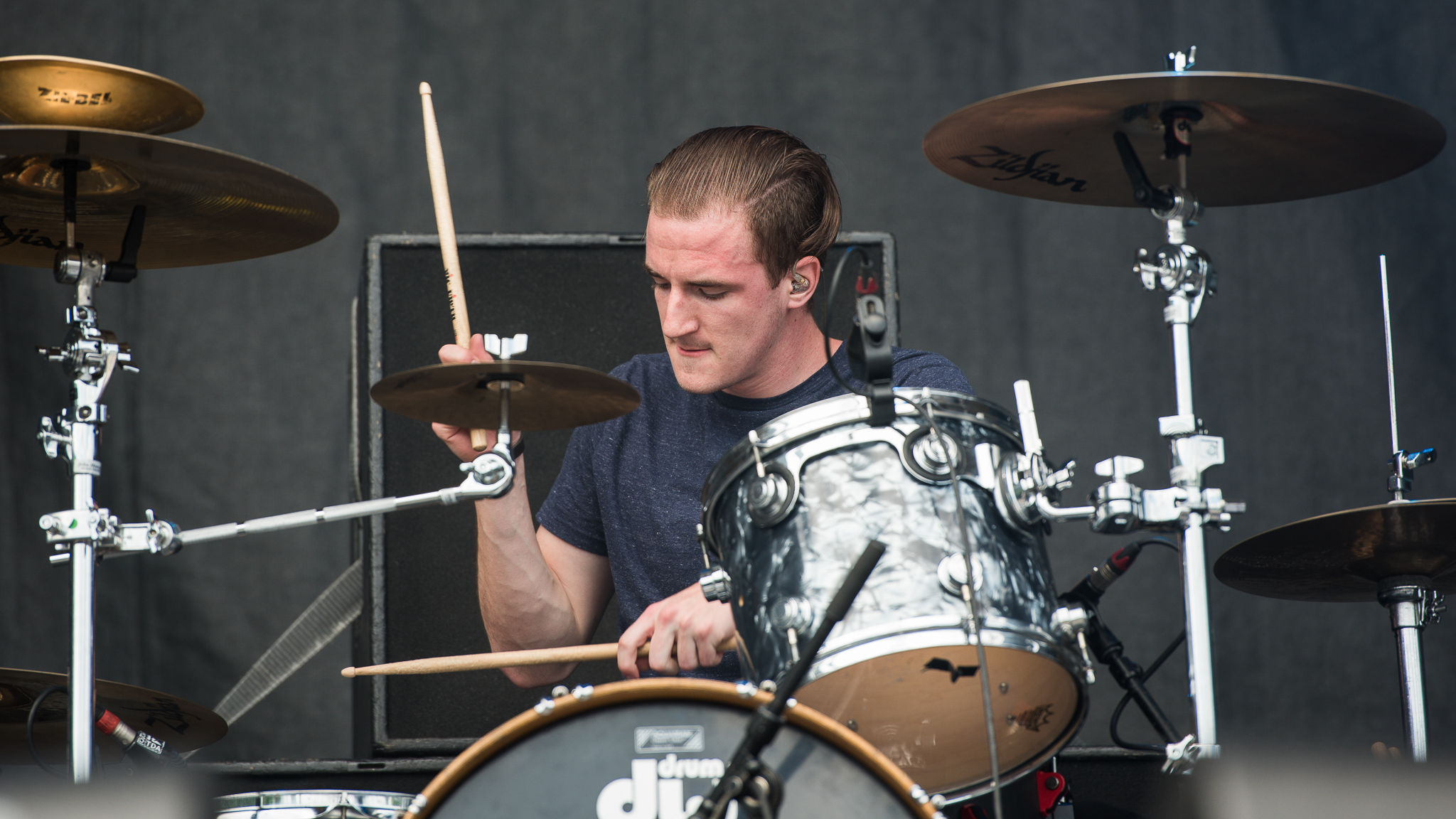
Drummer Stephen Kluesener

Current

- Briton Bond – lead vocals (2017–present); additional guitars (2019–present); unclean vocals (2010–2017)
- Seth Blake – lead guitar, backing vocals (2010–present)
- Cody Quistad – rhythm guitar, clean vocals (2010–present)
- Chris Gaylord – bass (2013–present); backing vocals (2017–present)
- Stephen Kluesener – drums (2013–present)

Former

- Jordan Pierce – bass (2010–2013)
- David Rau – drums (2010–2013)

Timeline

== Discography ==
Studio albums

- Blueprints (2015)
- Deadweight (2017)
- Pressure (2019)
- Manic (2021)
- Stigma (2024)
- Landfall (2026)
