= Andrew Wade =

American recording engineer (born 1984)

- Born: August 4, 1984 (age 42)
- Origin: Gainesville, Florida, U.S.
- Genres: Alternative rock, metalcore, pop punk, post-hardcore
- Occupations: Producer, engineer
- Years active: 2002–present
- Formerly of: A Wish for Marilynne
- Website: www.thewadestudio.com

Andrew Robert Wade (born August 4, 1984) is an American recording engineer and music producer.

== Early years and A Wish for Marilynne (2002–2006) ==
I wanted a name to go with our style but I didn’t want people to hear the name and say “Oh they’re Christian they’re no good” so I came up with a somewhat neutral name that matched our style.

— Ben Wade, A Wish for Marilynne bassist, on the band's name, 2004

In August 2002, Wade started playing guitar and singing lead vocals in Christian rock/emo band A Wish for Marilynne. (Note: A Wish for Marilynne consisted of: drummer London Bufford, keyboardist Daniel Deloach, guitarist Jarod Falck, lead vocalist/guitar Andrew Wade and vocalist/bassist Ben Wade. Andrew and Deloach had previously played in band Forever Grateful, and Bufford played in Strike Down, prior to A Wish for Marilynne.) By September 2003, the band had written seven songs, (Note: The band would also perform a cover of Oasis' "Wonderwall".) three of which made it on to a demo tape, that was recorded four months prior. (Note: The songs on the demo were: "A Gift from the Stars", "Broken Dreams" and "Bitter Realizations".) In an interview with the Ocala Star-Banner the band said that once they had ten songs they were going to start recording, and Wade said "it's (going to) be a lot better than the demo." By this point, the group had performed a total of twelve shows. The band started recording their album, Poetic Chaos, at Wade's The Wade Studio on May 10, 2004, with a projected release date of June.

In June, the band were booking dates for a summer tour with bands A Midnight and May and There for Tomorrow. The band performed at Easy Street in Ocala, Florida on June 3 with bands Starting Over and A Day to Remember, and at The Masquerade in Ocala, Florida on June 20 with bands Inkblot (Cornerstone '04), Vindicated Youth, and Knox Overstreet. In August, the band said on their website that the album would "be ready by the end of summer". Song songs were uploaded to the band's PureVolume account. In December, the band announced recording had finished and release was soon to follow. In February 2005, the band announced that the album, Poetic Chaos, was to be released on March 18. A release show was held Central Christian Church on the same day, featuring bands There For Tomorrow, A Day to Remember, and Starting Over. Song previews were also made available on the band's MySpace account. In early 2006, the band announced they were no longer together.

== Record producer (2004–present) ==
By October 2004, The Wade Studio's equipment was the following: Soundcraft Spirit E8 Mixer, Multicom Pro XL - compressor/limiter/gate, Soundtech ST31EQ - 31 band equalizer, Creative I-Trigue L3500 100 watt monitoring system, Edirol MA-10ABK Stereo Powered Monitors, a variety of plugins, Studiologic velocity-sensitive MIDI controller, Cad M177 condenser mic, Nady SCM900 condenser mic, Shure SM57, 3 CAD TSM411 dynamic drum mics, pair of Apex 170 condenser mics, and a CAD KBM412 large-diameter dynamic kick mic.

Wade, along with Drew Russ, under the name Manly Masculine Men recorded the theme song, "Making History", for the web series that was to support A Day to Remember's Common Courtesy (2013) album. "Making History" was released a single, under the name Manly Masculine Men on October 25.

Wade taught an online course in guitar production for creativeLIVE on both October 22 and 23, 2013.

Wade has also collaborated with audio software developers. He partnered with Joey Sturgis Tones to create the Bus Glue: Andrew Wade multibus processing bundle, designed around his mixing workflow. He also worked with Drumforge on the Drumshotz: Andrew Wade drum sample library, capturing his signature drum production sound.

In addition to CreativeLive, Wade has taught for URM Academy as the instructor of Ultimate Guitar Production, a course focused on modern rock and metal guitar recording techniques.

Wade has also appeared multiple times as a guest instructor on the Nail The Mix educational platform. His sessions have included breakdowns of songs by Neck Deep, A Day To Remember, and Attila.

== Artist discography ==
A Wish for Marilynne

- 3-track demo
- Poetic Chaos (2005) (Note: Track listing: "Genocide of Individualism", "Tale of a Kindred Spirit", "Broken Dreams", "A Gift from the Stars", "Killed by Time", "Bitter Realizations", "Hopeful Aspiration", "Rose of Sharon", "Abel's Fallen Angel", "Tale of a Kindred Spirit" (tws Remix), and "Wonderwall" (hidden track).)

Manly Masculine Men

- "Making History"

== Production discography ==
Year	Artist	Title	Label	Role
2003	A Wish for Marilynne	3-track demo	Self-released	Producer
2004	Daggers Within Smiles	5-track EP		Producer
2005	Amaurot	5-track demo		Producer
2005	Starting Over	5-track demo		Producer
2005	A Wish for Marilynne	Poetic Chaos		Producer, lead vocals, guitar
2005	The Dead Songwriters	A Fish Pitched Up by an Angry Sea		Producer, mixing
2005	Gilberto Zayas	Inundame de Ti		Producer, mixing
2005	Stronghold 18:2	Glorify the King		Producer, mixing
2005	Uptown Terminal	The Things We've Built (EP)		Producer, mixing
2005	Adam's Out	This Old Sole		Producer, mixing
2005	Ready, Charge!	Oh Allison (EP)		Producer, mixing
2005	This Solemn Vow	Self-titled EP		Producer, mixing
2005	Caillou	Self-titled EP		Producer, mixing
2005	Eversfield	The Vision (EP)		Producer, mixing
2005	Rodeia	Till We Have Face (EP)		Producer, mixing
2005	Leone	Watch the Fig Tree		Producer, mixing
2005	A Day to Remember	And Their Name Was Treason	Indianola	Producer, engineer, mixing, mastering
2005	Words Now Heard	Loud and Clear	JMB Editions (Spain)	Producer, programming
2005	Upper Class Trash	Favoring Blurred Lines	School Night	Producer, engineer, mixing, mastering, artwork, vocals
2007	Glendale	Songs of Our Lives		Producer, mixing
2007	VersaEmerge	Cities Built on Sand (EP)	Self-released	Producer, mixing
2008	The Gallery	If You Know What I Mean	Blue Duck	Producer, engineer, mixing, mastering, vocals
2008	The Midnight Life	Aslan's Fury	Indianola	Producer, engineer, mixing, mastering, guitar, backing vocals
2008	Paddock Park	A Hiding Place for Fake Friends	Eulogy	Engineer, mixing, mastering
2009	In Fear and Faith	Your World on Fire	Rise	Producer, engineer, mixing
2009	A Day to Remember	Homesick	Victory	Pre-production
2009	Burden of a Day	OneOneThousand	Rise	Producer, engineer, programming, guitar
2009	The Word Alive	Empire (EP)	Fearless	Producer, engineer, mixing, mastering
2010	Veara	What We Left Behind	Epitaph	Producer, mixing
2010	Our Last Night	We Will All Evolve	Epitaph	Producer, engineer
2010	Eyes Set to Kill	Broken Frames	BreakSilence	Producer, engineer, mixing, backing vocals
2010	The Word Alive	Deceiver	Fearless	Producer, engineer
2010	Motionless in White	Creatures	Fearless	Producer, engineer, mixing
2010	A Day to Remember	What Separates Me from You	Victory	Producer, engineer
2010	Chunk! No, Captain Chunk!	Something for Nothing	Fearless	Mixing
2010	Pierce The Veil	"Caraphernelia" on Selfish Machines	Equal Vision Records	Engineer
2011	This Time Next Year	Drop Out of Life	Equal Vision	Mastering
2011	Nothing to Prove	Pop Punk Destroyed My Life	Self-released	Producer, mixing
2011	A Loss for Words	No Sanctuary	Rise	Producer, mixing, mastering
2011	Close to Home	Never Back Down	Artery	Mixing
2011	The Air I Breathe	Great Faith in Fools	Rise	Producer
2011	Eyes Set to Kill	White Lotus	Foresee	Producer, engineer, mixing
2012	The Ghost Inside	Get What You Give	Epitaph	Engineer
2012	Close to Home	Momentum	Artery	Producer, engineer, mixing, composer
2012	The Scenery	It's Only Weather (EP)	Self-released	Producer, Mixing
2012	Issues	"Boyfriend" on Punk Goes Pop 5	Fearless	Producer, Mixing
2012	Coming This Fall	Sinking Sensation	Self-released	Mixing
2013	Eyes Set to Kill	Masks	Self-released	Composer
2013	These Hearts	Yours To Take	Victory	Mixing
2013	A Day to Remember	Common Courtesy	Self-released	Producer, engineer
2013	Shout London	Rememories	Self-released	Mastering
2014	Alfenic	"Felina" (Single)	Self-Released	Mixing, Mastering
2014	The Dead Rabbitts	Shapeshifter	Tragic Hero	Producer
2014	Nevada Rose	Paint Me in Light	Tragic Hero	Producer, engineer
2014	Across the Atlantic	First Things First (EP)	Self-Released	Producer, mixing
2014	Daylight	One More Fight	Fair Warning	Mixing
2014	The Ghost Inside	"Southtown" on Punk Goes 90s Vol. 2	Fearless	Producer, Mixing
2014	Her Name In Blood	Her Name In Blood	Triple Vision Entertainment	Mixing and Mastering
2014	The Ghost Inside	Dear Youth	Epitaph	Producer, Engineer, Mixing
2014	Final Story	"Take Me Away" (Single)	Self-Released	Mixing, Mastering
2014	With Friends Like These	"Arcadia" (Single)	Self-Released	Producer, Engineer, Mixing, Mastering
2015	Across the Atlantic	Holding on to What We Know	Self-Released	Producer, Engineer, Mixing, Mastering
2015	Oh Captain My Captain (currently called Rough Start)	Last Chance (EP)	Self-Released	Mixing, Mastering
2015	Neck Deep	Life's Not Out To Get You	Hopeless	Producer, Engineer, Mixing
2015	Wage War	Blueprints	Fearless	Producer, Engineer, Mixing
2015	Blessing A Curse	Satisfaction for the Vengeful	Smartpunk Records	Producer, Engineer, Mixing, Mastering
2015	Secrets	"Rise Up" on Everything That Got Us Here	Rise Records	Writer, Engineer, Producer
2016	FELICITY	Brace Yourself!	Self-Released	Producer, Engineer, Mixing, Mastering
2016	In Reverie	Embers	Self-Released	Producer, Engineer, Mixing, Mastering
2016	With Friends Like These	The Things That Surround You	Self-Released	Producer, Engineer, Mixing, Mastering
2016	Thomas Sanders	Ultimate Storytime	Foster Dawg, Inc	Engineer
2016	A Day To Remember	Bad Vibrations	Self Released	Writer, Engineer
2017	Miss May I	Shadows Inside	SharpTone	Mixing
2017	Currents	The Place I Feel Safest	SharpTone	Producer
2017	Wage War	Deadweight	Fearless	Producer, Engineer, Mixing
2017	Across the Atlantic	Works of Progress	SharpTone	Producer, Mixing
2017	Rough Start	Subsist	Independent	Producer, Mixing
2017	Execution Day	From The Bottom Of My Heart (EP)	Self Released	Writer, Engineer, Producer, Mixing, Mastering
2017	Alli Fitz	"Fill The Void" (Single)	Self Released	Writer, Engineer, Producer, Mixing, Mastering
2017	Dead Rabbits	This Emptiness	Tragic Hero Records	Mixing, Mastering
2017	Acaedia	Void (EP)		Writer, Engineer, Producer, Mixing, Mastering
2017	Attila	"Three 6" (Single)	Sharptone	Engineer, Producer, Mixing, Mastering
2018	Treehouse Kids	Labyrinths	Self-Released	Mixing, Mastering
2018	The New Age	Placebo	Self-Released	Mastering
2018	Boys Of Fall	Chasing Lonely (EP)	In Vogue Records	Writer, Engineer, Producer, Mixing, Mastering
2018	Boys Of Fall	Better Moments	In Vogue Records	Writer, Engineer, Producer, Mixing, Mastering
2018	Attila	"Pizza" (Single)	Duetti	Engineer, Producer, Mixing, Mastering
2018	Real Friends	"Ripcord" on Composure	Fearless Records	Writer
2018	Makari	Hyperreal	In Vogue Records	Writer, Engineer, Producer, Mixing, Mastering
2018	Trash Boat	Crown Shyness	Hopeless Records	Engineer, Producer, Mixing, Mastering
2019	Wage War	Pressure	Fearless	Producer, Engineer
2019	Capstan	Restless Heart, Keep Running	Fearless	Producer, Engineer, Mixing, Mastering
2019	Miss Fortune	Miss Fortune	Self-Released	Producer, Engineer, Mixing, Mastering
2019	Speech Patterns	"Another Mess" (Single)	Self Released	Writer, Engineer, Producer, Mixing, Mastering
2019	Speech Patterns	"Walk Away" (Single)	Self Released	Writer, Engineer, Producer, Mixing, Mastering
2019	Wake Up Hate	Deep Sleep	Self Released	Writer, Producer, Mixing, Mastering
2019	Attila	Villain	Duetti	Writer, Engineer, Producer, Mixing, Mastering
2019	408	Keri (EP)	Self Released	Writer, Engineer, Producer, Mixing, Mastering
2019	Alli Fitz	"Disease" (Single)	Self Released	Writer, Engineer, Producer, Mixing, Mastering
2019	Alli Fitz	"Tragic" (Single)	Self Released	Writer, Engineer, Producer, Mixing, Mastering
2019	Marshmello	"Rescue Me" on Joytime III	Joytime Collective	Writer, Engineer
2019	Thomas Sanders	"Recipe For Me" (Single)	Foster Dawg, Inc	Engineer
2019	Convictions	I Won't Survive	Self Released	Writer, Engineer, Producer, Mixing, Mastering
2020	Makari	Continuum	Self Released	Writer, Engineer, Producer, Mixing, Mastering
2020	Felicity	Old Habits (EP)	Penultimate Records	Writer, Engineer, Producer, Mixing, Mastering
2020	Josh A	You're Not Alone	Self Released	Writer, Engineer, Producer, Mixing, Mastering
2020	The Ghost Inside	The Ghost Inside	Epitaph	Engineer
2021	Josh A	Lonely Vibes	Self-Released	Producer, Engineer, Mixing, Mastering
2021	Wage War	Manic	Fearless	Producer, Engineer
2021	PotoMack	Unworthy (Single)	Unsigned	Producer, Engineer
2021	Smile On The Sinner	Nihilist (EP)	Medern Empire Music	Writer, Engineer, Producer, Mixing, Mastering
2021	Jake Hill	"Back On My Bullshit" (Single)	Self Released	Writer, Engineer, Producer, Mixing, Mastering
2021	Magnolia Park	Dream Eater (EP)	Self Released	Writer, Engineer, Producer, Mixing, Mastering
2021	Attila	Closure	Self Released	Writer, Engineer, Producer, Mixing, Mastering
2021	A Day To Remember	Live At The Audio Compound	Fueled By Ramen	Engineer, Mixing
2021	Magnolia Park	Halloween Mixtape	Epitaph	Writer, Engineer, Producer, Mixing, Mastering
2021	408	"Missed Call (27)" (Single)	Self Released	Writer, Engineer, Producer, Mixing, Mastering
2021	408	"Signal Mara" (Single)	Self Released	Writer, Engineer, Producer, Mixing, Mastering
2021	Felicity	Dear Universe	Adventure Cat Records	Writer, Engineer, Producer, Mixing, Mastering
2022	Wage War	The Stripped Sessions	Fearless Records	Engineer, Mixing, Mastering
2022	Magnolia Park	Heart Eater (EP)	Epitaph	Writer, Engineer, Producer, Mixing, Mastering
2022	Makari	"Phantom" (Single)	Self Released	Mixing, Mastering
2022	Josh A	Fearless II	Self Released	Engineer
2022	Belmont	Aftermath	Epitaph	Writer, Engineer, Producer, Mixing, Mastering
2022	Wake Up Hate	I Just Don't Love You Anymore	Self Released	Writer, Producer
2022	Wake Up Hate	"Demons" (Single)	Self Released	Writer, Producer
2022	Neck Deep	"STFU" (Single)	TB Records	Engineer
2022	Andrew Wade	Ten Years To Reach You	Self Released	Writer, Engineer, Producer, Mixing, Mastering
2022	Magnolia Park	Baku's Revenge	Epitaph	Writer, Engineer, Producer, Mixing, Mastering
2022	The New Age	Name Your Price (Single)	Self-Released	Mastering
2023	Wake Up Hate	"Relapse" (Single)	Dark Harmony Records	Writer
2023	Magnolia Park	Baku's Revenge (Deluxe)	Epitaph	Writer, Engineer, Producer, Mixing, Mastering
2023	Wake Up Hate	"Sink Or Swim" (Single)	Dark Harmony Records	Writer
2023	408	"Manic" (Single)	Epitaph	Writer, Engineer, Producer, Mixing, Mastering
2023	Magnolia Park	Moon Eater (EP)	Epitaph	Writer, Engineer, Producer, Mixing, Mastering
2023	Magnolia Park	Soul Eater (EP)	Epitaph	Writer, Engineer, Producer, Mixing, Mastering
2023	Hardy	"Radio Song" on The Mockingbird & The Crow	Big Loud Records	Engineer
2023	Real Friends	There's Nothing Worse Than Too Late	Pure Noise Records	Writer, Engineer, Producer
2023	UnityTX	Ferality	Pure Noise Records	Writer, Engineer, Producer, Mixing, Mastering
2023	Broadside	Hotel Bleu	Sharptone	Writer, Engineer, Producer, Mixing, Mastering
2023	Discrepancies	Product Of Entertainment (EP)		Writer, Engineer, Producer, Mixing, Mastering
2023	The Pretty Wild	Trigger Warning (EP)	Self Released	Writer, Engineer, Producer, Mixing, Mastering
2023	The Pretty Wild	"Roswell" (Single)	Self Released	Writer, Engineer, Producer, Mixing, Mastering
2023	The Pretty Wild	"Only Fans" (Single)	Self Released	Writer, Engineer, Producer, Mixing, Mastering
2023	The Pretty Wild	"Conversations" (Single)	Self Released	Writer, Engineer, Producer, Mixing, Mastering
2023	Magnolia Park	Halloween Mixtape II	Epitaph	Writer, Engineer, Producer, Mixing, Mastering
2023	This Wild Life	Never Fade		Mixing, Mastering, Featured Artist
2024	Magnolia Park	"Hellstar" (Single)	Self Released	Writer, Engineer, Producer, Mixing, Mastering
2024	Wake Up Hate	Drag Me To Hell	Dark Harmony Records	Writer, Producer
2024	Wake Up Hate	"Savage After Midnight" (Single)	Dark Harmony Records	Writer
2024	Magnolia Park	I2I (cover)	Disney	Engineer, Producer, Mixing, Mastering
2024	408	Hot Mess	Big Noise Music Group	Writer, Engineer, Producer
2024	Magnolia Park	"Shallow" (Single)	Epitaph	Writer, Engineer, Producer, Mixing, Mastering
2024	Josh A	The Return	Self Released	Engineer
2024	Makari	Wave Machine	Self Released	Writer, Engineer, Producer, Mixing, Mastering
2024	Real Friends	Blue Hour	Midwest Trash	Writer, Engineer, Producer
2024	The Pretty Wild	"Renascence" (Single)	Self Released	Writer, Engineer, Producer, Mixing, Mastering
2024	The Pretty Wild	"Black Ops (m@n!a)" (Single)	Self Released	Writer, Engineer, Producer, Mixing, Mastering
2024	The Pretty Wild	"Sleepwalker" (Single)	Self Released	Writer, Engineer, Producer, Mixing, Mastering
2024	The Pretty Wild	"Vessul (Singularity)" (Single)	Self Released	Writer, Engineer, Producer, Mixing, Mastering
2024	Daath	The Deceivers		Writer, Engineer
2024	Belmont	Liminal	Pure Noise Records	Writer, Engineer, Producer, Mixing, Mastering
2025	Magnolia Park	Vamp	Epitaph	Writer, Engineer, Producer
2025	Deadlands & The Pretty Wild	"Kundalini" (Single)	Spinefarm Music Group	Writer, Engineer, Producer, Mixing, Mastering
2025	A Day To Remember	Big Ole Album Vol. 1		Writer, Engineer
