= What Separates Me from You Tour =

2010–12 concert tour by A Day to Remember

- Tour by A Day to Remember
- November 2010 North American Tour
- Associated album: What Separates Me from You
- Start date: November 2, 2010
- End date: September 16, 2012
- Legs: 12
- No. of shows: 87 in North America; 20 in Oceania; 43 in Europe; 6 in Asia; 156 in Total

A Day to Remember concert chronology
- Homesick Tour (2009–10); What Separates Me from You Tour (2010–2012); Common Courtesy Tour (2012–present)

What Separates Me from You Tour was a concert tour by band A Day to Remember, taking place from late 2010, in support of their fourth studio album What Separates Me from You and finishing in September 2012. The tour started shortly after the Homesick Tour ended, earlier in August 2010.

The band embarked on the tour on November 2, 2010, with a first North American leg, with support slots by Underoath and The Word Alive. Before the official first leg, the band played 3 warm-up dates, at the Epicenter Festival in California, alongside Kiss, Blink-182, Rise Against, Papa Roach and more, a special Las Vegas date with support from Pierce the Veil and KFMA's Fall Ball, with Deftones, Circa Survive and more. The headlining tour took place between November 2–28, 2010, after which the band embarked on a series of radio stations festival dates in early December.

Following the US tour, the band played 4 dates in Australia as part of the No Sleep Til Festival, then embarking on a headlining tour of Europe in January–February 2011. This was followed by a headlining spring tour in North America, with dates both in the US and Canada, entitled The Gamechangers Tour, the tour featured support acts Bring Me the Horizon, We Came as Romans and Pierce the Veil.

During the Gamechangers Tour, the band played a special date at the Irving Plaza in New York City on March 15, in which the band played 3 different sets, with their main set, and two opening sets by themselves. The first was an acoustic set, the second was a set of rarities and never before played live songs by the band, and the third was the band's main set.

The band also played on the Warped Tour 2011 in the summer of 2011, and in October–November 2011 headlined the European Eastpak Antidote Tour with supporting acts August Burns Red, The Ghost Inside and Living with Lions.

== Set list ==
Epicenter Festival
- "The Downfall of Us All"
- "A Shot in the Dark"
- "I'm Made of Wax, Larry, What Are You Made Of?"
- "Mr. Highway's Thinking About the End"
- "Welcome to the Family"
- "Why Walk on Water When We've Got Boats"
- "The Danger in Stating a Fire"

Encore

- "Have Faith in Me"
- "The Plot to Bomb the Panhandle"
North America, Leg #1
- "2nd Sucks"
- "A Shot in the Dark"
- "The Danger in Stating a Fire"
- "My Life for Hire"
- "Fast Forward to 2012"
- "Monument"
- "NJ Legion Iced Tea"
- "Mr. Highway's Thinking About the End"
- "You Already Know What You Are"
- "Homesick"
- "You Should've Killed Me When You Had the Chance"
- "Speak of the Devil"
- "Holdin' It Down for the Underground"
- "Why Walk on Water When We've Got Boats"
- "All I Want"
- "I'm Made of Wax, Larry, What Are You Made Of?"

Encore

- "The Downfall of Us All"
- "Have Faith in Me"
- "The Plot to Bomb the Panhandle"
Europe, Leg #1
- "2nd Sucks"
- "The Danger in Stating a Fire"
- "A Shot in the Dark"
- "My Life for Hire"
- "I'm Made of Wax, Larry, What Are You Made Of?"
- "All I Want"
- "Mr. Highway's Thinking About the End"
- "This Is the House That Doubt Built"
- "Sticks & Bricks"
- "You Already Know What You Are"
- "Homesick"
- "Why Walk on Water When We've Got Boats"
- "Fast Forward to 2012"
- "Monument"
- "Have Faith in Me"
- "You Should've Killed Me When You Had the Chance"

Encore

- "If It Means a Lot to You"
- "The Downfall of Us All"
- "The Plot to Bomb the Panhandle"
North America, Leg #2
- "Sticks & Bricks"
- "The Danger in Stating a Fire"
- "A Shot in the Dark"
- "You Be Tails, I'll Be Sonic"
- "My Life for Hire"
- "All I Want"
- "I'm Made of Wax, Larry, What Are You Made Of?"
- "All Signs Point to Lauderdale"
- "Mr. Highway's Thinking About the End"
- "This is the House That Doubt Built"
- "2nd Sucks"
- "Why Walk on Water When We've Got Boats"
- "Monument"
- "Homesick"
- "Have Faith in Me"
- "You Should've Killed Me When You Had the Chance" / "Heartless" (Varied between shows)
- "The Plot to Bomb the Panhandle"

Encore

- "If It Means a Lot to You"
- "The Downfall of Us All"
March 15, 2011, Irving Plaza special set

Acoustic set

- "Homesick"
- "Monument"
- "No Cigar" (Millencolin cover)
- "Have Faith in Me"
- "If It Means a Lot to You"

Rarities set

- "Another Song About the Weekend"
- "Since U Been Gone" (Kelly Clarkson cover)
- "Right Where You Want Me to Be"
- "Here's to the Past"
- "Holdin' It Down for the Underground"
- "I Heard It's the Softest Thing Ever"
- "Show 'Em the Ropes"
- "1958"
- "Heartless"

Main set

- "Sticks & Bricks"
- "The Danger in Stating a Fire"
- "A Shot in the Dark"
- "You Be Tails, I'll Be Sonic"
- "My Life for Hire"
- "All I Want"
- "I'm Made of Wax, Larry, What Are You Made Of?"
- "All Signs Point to Lauderdale"
- "Mr. Highway's Thinking About the End"
- "This Is the House That Doubt Built"
- "2nd Sucks"
- "Why Walk on Water When We've Got Boats"
- "You Should've Killed Me When You Had the Chance"
- "The Plot to Bomb the Panhandle"

Encore

- "The Downfall of Us All"
Oceania, Leg #2
- "Sticks & Bricks"
- "The Danger in Stating a Fire"
- "A Shot in the Dark"
- "You Be Tails, I'll Be Sonic"
- "All I Want"
- "My Life for Hire"
- "I'm Made of Wax, Larry, What Are You Made Of?"
- "All Signs Point to Lauderdale"
- "Mr. Highway's Thinking About the End"
- "This Is the House That Doubt Built"
- "2nd Sucks"
- "Why Walk on Water When We've Got Boats"
- "It's Complicated"
- "Homesick"
- "You Should've Killed Me When You Had the Chance" / "Heartless" (Varied between shows)
- "Have Faith in Me"
- "The Plot to Bomb the Panhandle"

Encore

- "If It Means a Lot to You"
- "The Downfall of Us All"
North America, Leg #3 (Warped Tour)
- "I'm Made of Wax, Larry, What Are You Made Of?"
- "A Shot in the Dark"
- "My Life for Hire"
- "All Signs Point to Lauderdale"
- "Mr. Highway's Thinking About the End" / "Sticks & Bricks" (Varied between shows)
- "2nd Sucks"
- "Heartless" / "You Be Tails, I'll Be Sonic" (Varied between shows)
- "All I Want"
- "The Plot to Bomb the Panhandle"
- "Have Faith in Me"
- "The Downfall of Us All"
Europe, Leg #2
- "Sticks & Bricks"
- "The Danger in Stating a Fire"
- "A Shot in the Dark"
- "You Be Tails, I'll Be Sonic"
- "My Life for Hire"
- "All I Want"
- "I'm Made of Wax, Larry, What Are You Made Of?"
- "All Signs Point to Lauderdale"
- "Mr. Highway's Thinking About the End"
- "This Is the House That Doubt Built"
- "2nd Sucks"
- "Why Walk on Water When We've Got Boats"
- "Monument" / "It's Complicated" (Varied between shows)
- "Homesick"
- "Have Faith in Me"
- "You Should've Killed Me When You Had the Chance" / "Heartless" (Varied between shows)
- "The Plot to Bomb the Panhandle"

Encore

- "If It Means a Lot to You"
- "The Downfall of Us All"
North America, Leg #4
- "I'm Made of Wax, Larry, What Are You Made Of?"
- "A Shot in the Dark"
- "My Life for Hire"
- "All I Want"
- "It's Complicated"
- "All Signs Point to Lauderdale"
- "2nd Sucks"
- "Homesick"
- "Have Faith In Me"
- "The Plot to Bomb the Panhandle"
- "The Downfall of Us All"
North America, Leg #5
- "The Downfall of Us All"
- "A Shot in the Dark"
- "I'm Made of Wax, Larry, What Are You Made Of?"
- "My Life for Hire"
- "All Signs Point to Lauderdale"
- "2nd Sucks"
- "You Be Tails, I'll Be Sonic"
- "Homesick"
- "Monument" / "No Cigar" (Millencolin cover) (Varied between shows)
- "Better Off This Way"
- "Have Faith in Me"
- "All I Want"
- "The Plot to Bomb the Panhandle"
Oceania, Leg #3 (Soundwave)
- "The Downfall of Us All"
- "I'm Made of Wax, Larry, What Are You Made Of?"
- "A Shot in the Dark"
- "My Life for Hire"
- "All Signs Point to Lauderdale"
- "2nd Sucks"
- "It's Complicated"
- "Have Faith in Me"
- "All I Want"
- "The Plot to Bomb the Panhandle"
Asia, Leg #1
- "The Downfall of Us All"
- "A Shot in the Dark"
- "I'm Made of Wax, Larry, What Are You Made Of?"
- "My Life for Hire"
- "All Signs Point to Lauderdale"
- "It's Complicated"
- "2nd Sucks"
- "The Danger in Stating a Fire"
- "You Be Tails, I'll Be Sonic"
- "Better Off This Way"
- "Mr. Highway's Thinking About the End"
- "Sticks & Bricks"
- "Why Walk on Water When We've Got Boats"
- "Monument"
- "Homesick"
- "Have Faith in Me"
- "You Should've Killed Me When You Had the Chance"

Encore

- "All I Want"
- "The Plot to Bomb the Panhandle"

== Tour dates ==
Date	City	Country	Venue	Attendance	Revenue
North America
November 2, 2010	Myrtle Beach	United States	House of Blues	—N/a	—N/a
November 3, 2010	Raleigh	United States	Disco Rodeo	—N/a	—N/a
November 4, 2010	Norfolk	United States	The NorVa	—N/a	—N/a
November 5, 2010	Asbury Park	United States	Asbury Park Convention Hall	—N/a	—N/a
November 6, 2010	Allentown	United States	Crocodile Rock	—N/a	—N/a
November 8, 2010	Clifton Park	United States	Northern Lights	—N/a	—N/a
November 9, 2010	Poughkeepsie	United States	Mid-Hudson Civic Center	—N/a	—N/a
November 10, 2010	Providence	United States	Lupo's Heartbreak Hotel	—N/a	—N/a
November 12, 2010	Toledo	United States	Headliners	—N/a	—N/a
November 13, 2010	Louisville	United States	Expo Five	—N/a	—N/a
November 14, 2010	Grand Rapids	United States	Orbit Room	—N/a	—N/a
November 16, 2010	Milwaukee	United States	The Rave	—N/a	—N/a
November 17, 2010	Sauget	United States	Pop's	—N/a	—N/a
November 18, 2010	Des Moines	United States	Val Air Ballroom	—N/a	—N/a
November 19, 2010	Oklahoma City	United States	Diamond Ballroom	—N/a	—N/a
November 20, 2010	Albuquerque	United States	Sunshine Theatre	—N/a	—N/a
November 21, 2010	El Paso	United States	Club 101	—N/a	—N/a
November 22, 2010	San Antonio	United States	Backstage Live	—N/a	—N/a
November 23, 2010	Mission	United States	Las Palmas Race Park	—N/a	—N/a
November 24, 2010	New Orleans	United States	House of Blues	—N/a	—N/a
November 27, 2010	Nashville	United States	Rocketown	—N/a	—N/a
November 28, 2010	Memphis	United States	The New Daisy Theatre	—N/a	—N/a
December 3, 2010 (Note: The shows on December 3, 2010 and December 4, 2011 were part of X102.9 FM's The Big Ticket.)	Jacksonville	United States	WXXJ Radio Station	—N/a	—N/a
December 4, 2010 (Note: This show on December 4, 2010 was part of 103.1 The Buzz's Buzz Bake Sale.)	West Palm Beach	United States	WMSF Radio Station	—N/a	—N/a
December 5, 2010 (Note: The shows on December 5, 2010 and December 3, 2011 were part of 97x's Next Big Thing.)	Tampa	United States	WSUN-FM	—N/a	—N/a
December 8, 2010 (Note: The show on December 8, 2010 was part of 96.5's The Night the Buzz Stole Christmas.)	Kansas City	United States	KRBZ Radio Stadion	—N/a	—N/a
December 11, 2010 (Note: The show on December 11, 2010 was part of KROQ Almost Acoustic Christmas.)	Los Angeles	United States	KROQ-FM Radio Station	—N/a	—N/a
December 12, 2010 (Note: The show on December 12, 2010 was part of 91x Wrex the Halls.)	San Diego	United States	XETRA-FM Radio Station	—N/a	—N/a
Asia-Pacific
December 15, 2010 (Note: The shows on December 15, 17, 18, and 19, 2010 were part of No Sleep Til Festival.)	Adelaide	Australia	Adelaide Entertainment Centre	—N/a	—N/a
December 17, 2010	Melbourne	Australia	Royal Melbourne Showgrounds	—N/a	—N/a
December 18, 2010	Sydney	Australia	The Entertainment Quarter	—N/a	—N/a
December 19, 2010	Brisbane	Australia	Brisbane Exhibition Ground	—N/a	—N/a
Europe
January 29, 2011	Dublin	Ireland	The Academy	850 / 850	$26,182
January 30, 2011	Manchester	England	Manchester Apollo	—N/a	—N/a
January 31, 2011 (Note: The show in Glasgow was originally scheduled for January 28, 2011.)	Glasgow	Scotland	O_{2} Academy Glasgow	—N/a	—N/a
February 1, 2011	Newcastle	England	O_{2} Academy Newcastle	—N/a	—N/a
February 2, 2011	Birmingham	England	O_{2} Academy Birmingham	—N/a	—N/a
February 3, 2011	Bristol	England	O_{2} Academy Bristol	—N/a	—N/a
February 4, 2011	Brighton	England	Brighton Dome	—N/a	—N/a
February 5, 2011	London	England	Brixton Academy	—N/a	—N/a
February 8, 2011	Brussels	Belgium	Ancienne Belgique	—N/a	—N/a
February 9, 2011	Amsterdam	Netherlands	Melkweg	—N/a	—N/a
February 10, 2011	Paris	France	Nouveau Casino	—N/a	—N/a
February 11, 2011	Lyon	France	CCO Villeurbanne	—N/a	—N/a
February 12, 2011	Barcelona	Spain	Razzmatazz	—N/a	—N/a
February 14, 2011	Bologna	Italy	Estragon	—N/a	—N/a
February 15, 2011	Zürich	Switzerland	Dynamo	—N/a	—N/a
February 16, 2011	Munich	Germany	Theater Fabrik	—N/a	—N/a
February 17, 2011	Stuttgart	Germany	LKA-Longhorn	—N/a	—N/a
February 18, 2011	Cologne	Germany	Essigfabrik	—N/a	—N/a
February 19, 2011	Hamburg	Germany	Große Freiheit	—N/a	—N/a
February 20, 2011	Berlin	Germany	Huxley's	—N/a	—N/a
February 22, 2011	Münster	Germany	Skaters Palace	—N/a	—N/a
North America
March 10, 2011	Philadelphia	United States	Electric Factory	—N/a	—N/a
March 11, 2011	Philadelphia	United States	Electric Factory	—N/a	—N/a
March 12, 2011	Worcester	United States	The Palladium	—N/a	—N/a
March 13, 2011	Worcester	United States	The Palladium	—N/a	—N/a
March 15, 2011	New York	United States	Irving Plaza	—N/a	—N/a
March 16, 2011	Pittsburgh	United States	Stage AE	4,600 / 4,600	$121,900
March 17, 2011	Pittsburgh	United States	Stage AE	4,600 / 4,600	$121,900
March 18, 2011	Buffalo	United States	The Rapids Theatre	—N/a	—N/a
March 19, 2011	Montreal	Canada	Métropolis	—N/a	—N/a
March 20, 2011	Toronto	Canada	Sound Academy	—N/a	—N/a
March 22, 2011	Royal Oak	United States	Royal Oak Music Theatre	3,400 / 3,400	$85,000
March 23, 2011	Royal Oak	United States	Royal Oak Music Theatre	3,400 / 3,400	$85,000
March 24, 2011	Chicago	United States	Congress Theater	—N/a	—N/a
March 25, 2011	Minneapolis	United States	Club Epic	—N/a	—N/a
March 26, 2011	Kansas City	United States	Beaumont Club	—N/a	—N/a
March 27, 2011	Denver	United States	The Fillmore	—N/a	—N/a
March 29, 2011	Salt Lake City	United States	The Great Salt Air	—N/a	—N/a
March 30, 2011	Spokane	United States	Knitting Factory	1,428 / 1,428	$35,700
March 31, 2011	Seattle	United States	Showbox at the Market	—N/a	—N/a
April 1, 2011	Vancouver	Canada	Vogue Theatre	1,216 / 1,222	$42,002
April 2, 2011	Portland	United States	Roseland Theatre	—N/a	—N/a
April 3, 2011	San Francisco	United States	The Warfield	—N/a	—N/a
April 5, 2011	Fresno	United States	Woodward Park Amphitheater	—N/a	—N/a
April 6, 2011	Los Angeles	United States	Hollywood Palladium	—N/a	—N/a
April 7, 2011	San Diego	United States	San Diego Sports Arena	—N/a	—N/a
April 8, 2011	Phoenix	United States	Marquee Theater	—N/a	—N/a
April 9, 2011	Phoenix	United States	Marquee Theater	—N/a	—N/a
April 11, 2011	Tulsa	United States	Brady Theater	—N/a	—N/a
April 12, 2011	Austin	United States	Moody Theater	—N/a	—N/a
April 13, 2011	Houston	United States	Warehouse Live	—N/a	—N/a
April 15, 2011	Atlanta	United States	Masquerade Music Park	—N/a	—N/a
April 16, 2011 (Note: The show on April 16, 2011 was part of Earthday Birthday.)	Orlando	United States	Tinker Field	—N/a	—N/a
April 17, 2011	Boca Raton	United States	Sunset Cove Amphitheater	3,225 / 3,225	$76,563
April 18, 2011	Tampa	United States	Jannus Landing	2,000 / 2,000	$44,860
April 30, 2011 (Note: The show on April 30, 2011 was part of Edgefest.)	Frisco	United States	FC Dallas Stadium	—N/a	—N/a
May 1, 2011	East Rutherford	United States	Meadowlands Sports Complex	—N/a	—N/a
Asia-Pacific
May 8, 2011	Perth	Australia	Astor Cinema	—N/a	—N/a
May 10, 2011	Adelaide	Australia	Thebarton Theatre	—N/a	—N/a
May 12, 2011	Melbourne	Australia	Festival Hall	—N/a	—N/a
May 13, 2011	Sydney	Australia	Big Top Luna Park	—N/a	—N/a
May 14, 2011	Sydney	Australia	Big Top Luna Park	—N/a	—N/a
May 15, 2011	Brisbane	Australia	Tivoli Theatre	—N/a	—N/a
May 17, 2011	Gold Coast	Australia	Coolangatta Hotel	—N/a	—N/a
May 18, 2011	Brisbane	Australia	Tivoli Theatre	—N/a	—N/a
North America
May 22, 2011 (Note: The show on May 22, 2011 was part of Rock on the Range.)	Columbus	United States	Columbus Crew Stadium	—N/a	—N/a
June 3, 2011 (Note: The show on June 3, 2011 was part of Rockin' Roots Festival.)	Bakersfield	United States	Stramler Park	—N/a	—N/a
June 4, 2011 (Note: The show on June 4, 2011 was part of KROQ Weenie Roast.)	Irvine	United States	Verizon Wireless Amphitheatre	—N/a	—N/a
South America
June 7, 2011	Santiago	Chile	Teatro Teletón	—N/a	—N/a
June 8, 2011	Porto Alegre	Brazil	Bar Opinião	—N/a	—N/a
June 9, 2011	São Paulo	Brazil	Carioca Club	—N/a	—N/a
June 10, 2011	Curitiba	Brazil	Curitiba Master Hall	—N/a	—N/a
June 11, 2011	São Paulo	Brazil	Carioca Club	—N/a	—N/a
June 12, 2011	Buenos Aires	Argentina	Teatro Colegiales	—N/a	—N/a
Europe
October 20, 2011	Hamburg	Germany	Große Freiheit	—N/a	—N/a
October 21, 2011	Gothenburg	Sweden	Brewhouse	—N/a	—N/a
October 22, 2011	Oslo	Norway	Rockefeller Music Hall	—N/a	—N/a
October 24, 2011	Helsinki	Finland	Nosturi	—N/a	—N/a
October 26, 2011	Stockholm	Sweden	Fryshuset	—N/a	—N/a
October 27, 2011	Malmö	Sweden	KB Kulturbolaget	—N/a	—N/a
October 28, 2011	Leipzig	Germany	Werk 2	—N/a	—N/a
October 29, 2011	Oberhausen	Germany	Turbinenhalle	—N/a	—N/a
October 31, 2011	Paris	France	Bataclan Theatre	—N/a	—N/a
November 1, 2011	Toulouse	France	Le Bikini	—N/a	—N/a
November 2, 2011	Barcelona	Spain	Razzmatazz	—N/a	—N/a
November 3, 2011	Madrid	Spain	Palacio Vistalegre	—N/a	—N/a
November 5, 2011	Montpellier	France	Le Rockstore	—N/a	—N/a
November 6, 2011	Milan	Italy	Magazzini Generali	—N/a	—N/a
November 8, 2011	Vienna	Austria	Gasometer	—N/a	—N/a
November 9, 2011	Munich	Germany	Tonhalle	—N/a	—N/a
November 11, 2011	Tilburg	Netherlands	Poppodium 013	—N/a	—N/a
November 12, 2011	Brussels	Belgium	Ancienne Belgique	—N/a	—N/a
November 15, 2011	Manchester	England	Manchester Academy	—N/a	—N/a
November 17, 2011	Nottingham	England	Rock City	—N/a	—N/a
November 18, 2011	London	England	London Forum	—N/a	—N/a
November 19, 2011	London	England	London Forum	—N/a	—N/a
North America
December 2, 2011 (Note: The show on December 2, 2011 was part of 102.1 FM's How the Edge Stole Christmas.)	Grand Prairie	United States	KDGE Radio Station	—N/a	—N/a
December 3, 2011	Tampa	United States	WSUN-FM Radio Station	—N/a	—N/a
December 4, 2011	Jacksonville	United States	WXXJ Radio Station	—N/a	—N/a
December 8, 2011 (Note: The show on December 8, 2011 was part of X107.5's Holiday Havoc.)	Paradise (Note: Promoted as Las Vegas)	United States	The Joint	3,914 / 3,914	$163,325
December 10, 2011 (Note: The show on December 10, 2011 was part of 104.1's Nightmare Before Xmas.)	Fresno	United States	Selland Arena	4,132 / 7,135	$145,535
January 17, 2012	Austin	United States	Austin Music Hall	1,721 / 3,249	$66,259
January 18, 2012	San Antonio	United States	Illusions Theater at Alamodome	—N/a	—N/a
January 21, 2012	Orlando	United States	UCF Arena	5,443 / 5,988	$179,007
January 22, 2012	Columbia	United States	Township Auditorium	2,525 / 3,166	$78,630
January 24, 2012	Norfolk	United States	Ted Constant Convocation Center	4,191 / 5,820	$138,225
January 26, 2012	Kent	United States	Memorial Athletic and Convocation Center	—N/a	—N/a
January 27, 2012	Chicago	United States	UIC Pavilion	—N/a	—N/a
January 29, 2012	State College	United States	Bryce Jordan Center	5,338 / 7,600	$175,703
January 30, 2012	Poughkeepsie	United States	Mid-Hudson Civic Center	—N/a	—N/a
February 1, 2012	Lowell	United States	Paul E. Tsongas Arena	4,989 / 6,280	$175,242
February 3, 2012	Uniondale	United States	Nassau Veterans Memorial Coliseum	—N/a	—N/a
February 4, 2012	Camden	United States	Susquehanna Bank Center	—N/a	—N/a
February 5, 2012	Fairfax	United States	Patriot Center	—N/a	—N/a
Asia-Pacific
February 23, 2012	Auckland	New Zealand	Logan Campbell Centre	—N/a	—N/a
February 25, 2012 (Note: This concert was part of Soundwave Festival.)	Brisbane	Australia	Brisbane Exhibition Ground	—N/a	—N/a
February 26, 2012	Sydney	Australia	Sydney Showground	—N/a	—N/a
February 27, 2012	Brisbane	Australia	Eatons Hill Hotel & Function Centre	—N/a	—N/a
February 28, 2012	Sydney	Australia	University of New South Wales Roundhouse	—N/a	—N/a
March 2, 2012	Melbourne	Australia	Royal Melbourne Showgrounds	—N/a	—N/a
March 3, 2012	Adelaide	Australia	Bonython Park	—N/a	—N/a
March 5, 2012	Perth	Australia	Claremont Showground	—N/a	—N/a
March 9, 2012	Jakarta	Indonesia	Senayan Sports Complex	—N/a	—N/a
March 10, 2012	Makassar	Indonesia	Lapangan Basket Karebosi	—N/a	—N/a
March 12, 2012	Kallang	Singapore	Fort Canning Park	—N/a	—N/a
March 14, 2012	Bangkok	Thailand	AUA Auditorium	—N/a	—N/a
March 16, 2012	Manila	Philippines	Ynares Sports Arena	—N/a	—N/a
March 21, 2012	Tokyo	Japan	Club Quattro	—N/a	—N/a
North America
April 15, 2012	San Diego	United States	Viejas Arena	—N/a	—N/a
April 16, 2012	Bakersfield	United States	Rabobank Arena	—N/a	—N/a
April 17, 2012	San Jose	United States	SJSU Events Center	3,565 / 6,539	$134,568
April 19, 2012	Kent	United States	Accesso ShoWare Center	—N/a	—N/a
April 20, 2012	Boise	United States	Century Link Arena	—N/a	—N/a
April 21, 2012	Salt Lake City	United States	The Great Salt Air	—N/a	—N/a
April 23, 2012	Rio Rancho	United States	Santa Ana Star Center	—N/a	—N/a
April 26, 2012	Pelham	United States	Verizon Wireless Music Center	—N/a	—N/a
April 27, 2012	St. Augustine	United States	St. Augustine Amphitheatre	—N/a	—N/a
April 28, 2012	Boca Raton	United States	Sunset Cove Amphitheatre	3,320 / 3,500	$111,571
April 30, 2012	Tampa	United States	Green Iguana Stadium	—N/a	—N/a
May 1, 2012	Atlanta	United States	Masquerade Music Park	3,145 / 3,801	$111,495
May 2, 2012	Charlotte	United States	Time Warner Cable Uptown Amphitheatre	—N/a	—N/a
May 4, 2012	Indianapolis	United States	The Lawn at Riverbend Music	—N/a	—N/a
May 5, 2012	Cincinnati	United States	PNC Pavilion at Riverbend Music Center	—N/a	—N/a
May 6, 2012	Pittsburgh	United States	Stage AE	5,000 / 5,000	$180,000
May 8, 2012 (Note: The show on May 8, 2012 was part of the New York State Fair.)	Geddes (Note: Promoted as Syracuse)	United States	Chevy Court	—N/a	—N/a
May 10, 2012	Toronto	Canada	Air Canada Centre	—N/a	—N/a
July 1, 2012 (Note: The show on July 1, 2012 was part of Boonstock Music and Arts Festival.)	Gibbons	Canada	Gibbons Festival Grounds	—N/a	—N/a
September 16, 2012 (Note: The show on September 16, 2012 was part of Riot Fest.)	Chicago	United States	Humboldt Park	—N/a	—N/a
Total				64,002 / 78,717 (81%)	$2,091,767

== Support acts ==
- Adept (February 9, 12–22, 2011)
- Antagonist A.D. (February 23, 2012)
- August Burns Red (October 20–November 18, 2011)
- Bayside (January 30–February 12, 2011)
- Bring Me the Horizon (March 10–13, 16–April 18, 2011)
- Close Your Eyes (November 2–28, 2010)
- Deny (June 12, 2011)
- Glassjaw (February 3, 2012)
- Her Name In Blood (March 21, 2012)
- Living with Lions (October 20–November 18, 2011)
- Pierce the Veil (October 22, 2010; January 29–February 22, March 10–13, 16–April 18, 2011)
- Snakes of Iron (February 23, 2012)
- The Ghost Inside (October 20–November 18, 2011)
- The Menzingers (January 17–February 5, 2012)
- The Used (February 27–28, 2012)
- The Word Alive (November 2–19, 21–28, 2010)
- 'Til Death Do Us Party (February 23, 2012)
- Title Fight (April 15–May 10, 2012)
- Underoath (November 2–19, 21–28, 2010; May 8–17, 2011; March 9, 2012)
- We Came as Romans (March 10–13, 16–April 18, 2011)
- Yashin (January 31, 2011)
- You Me at Six (February 27–28, 2012)

== Personnel ==
- Jeremy McKinnon – lead vocals
- Kevin Skaff – lead guitar, vocals
- Neil Westfall – rhythm guitar, backing vocals
- Joshua Woodard – bass
- Alex Shelnutt – drums, percussion

== Songs played ==
=== From And Their Name Was Treason ===
- "Heartless"
- "You Should Have Killed Me When You Had the Chance"
- "1958"

=== From For Those Who Have Heart ===
- "Fast Forward to 2012"
- "Speak of the Devil"
- "The Danger in Starting a Fire"
- "The Plot to Bomb the Panhandle"
- "Monument"
- "Show 'Em the Ropes"
- "A Shot in the Dark"
- "Here's to the Past"
- "I Heard It's the Softest Thing Ever"
- "Since U Been Gone" (Kelly Clarkson cover)
- "Why Walk on Water When We've Got Boats"

=== From Homesick ===
- "The Downfall of Us All"
- "My Life for Hire"
- "I'm Made of Wax, Larry, What Are You Made Of?"
- "NJ Legion Iced Tea"
- "Mr. Highway's Thinking About the End"
- "Have Faith in Me"
- "Welcome to the Family"
- "Homesick"
- "Holdin' It Down for the Underground"
- "You Already Know What You Are"
- "Another Song About the Weekend
- "If It Means a Lot to You"

=== From What Separates Me from You ===
- "Sticks & Bricks"
- "All I Want"
- "It's Complicated"
- "This Is the House That Doubt Built"
- "2nd Sucks"
- "All Signs Point to Lauderdale"
- "You Be Tails, I'll Be Sonic"

=== Others ===
- "Right Where You Want Me to Be"
- "No Cigar" (Millencolin cover)
