= Common Courtesy (album) =

- Original album artwork by Tony Moore

Studio album by A Day to Remember
- Released: October 8, 2013
- Studio: Jeremy McKinnon's home studio, Orlando, Florida
- Genre: Pop-punk; metalcore
- Length: 53:11
- Label: ADTR
- Producer: Jeremy McKinnon; Andrew Wade; Chad Gilbert

A Day to Remember chronology
What Separates Me from You (2010)	Common Courtesy (2013)	Bad Vibrations (2016)

Singles from Common Courtesy
- 1. "Right Back at It Again" Released: November 11, 2013; 2. "End of Me" Released: March 25, 2014

Front-page booklet artwork
- Original artwork by Mike Cortada

Common Courtesy is the fifth studio album by the American rock band A Day to Remember. The album was self-released on October 8, 2013. Songs for the album were written in mid-2011. Recording started in early 2012 and continued into the following March, the same month the recordings were mixed. During that time, an unmixed version of "Violence (Enough Is Enough)" was streamed from the band's website. The band then embarked on the Right Back at It Again Tour in March 2013, with the namesake of the tour being the new song which was performed at each show. From mid-August to late-September, the group released webisodes to tie-in with the album. "Dead & Buried", another song that would appear on the album, was played at each show on their month-long House Party Tour, which began in September 2013.

In December 2011, the band was involved in a lawsuit with its label Victory that had been partly resolved a few days before the album's release. This lawsuit led to the band's initial digital self-release of the album in October; a physical release followed in November which included three bonus tracks. Common Courtesy charted at number 34 in the UK and number 37 in the U.S., and was met with critical acclaim, with critics praising the album's consistent sound and defiant attitude toward Victory. "Right Back at It Again" and "End of Me" served as the album's singles; the former charted at number 33 on the Alternative Songs chart and at number 40 on the Mainstream Rock Songs chart in the U.S., while the latter reached at number 40 on Alternative Songs and at number 26 on Mainstream Rock Songs.

== Background ==
Shortly after the end of Warped Tour in July 2011, A Day to Remember took a break to compose new material. In an interview with Alternative Press in November, vocalist Jeremy McKinnon said after the band finished touring Europe, it would be recording its next album. McKinnon also said he had "been writing constantly for the course of the two years" while the band was touring, and he was "really happy" with the material accumulated up to that point.

On December 15, it was announced A Day to Remember had plans to press charges against their label Victory Records due to breach of contract. Claiming withheld royalties of over $75,000, the group reportedly started legal action against the label on May 31 that year. Victory responded with a statement saying the lawsuit was about the band's refusal to fulfill its five-album contractual commitment to Victory and its new-found desire to move to a major label. A Day to Remember gave Alternative Press a statement saying:

A Day To Remember would like to make it clear that they did not announce nor seek any attention regarding their ongoing suit with Victory Records. This information has been public record since May of 2011 and they have no intention of speaking publicly or disparagingly regarding their disagreement with Victory. A Day To Remember will continue to release music for their fans.

== Recording ==
In January 2012, guitarist Kevin Skaff said A Day To Remember would be recording after they had finished touring in early May. The band was aiming to have the new album completed by August, with the intention that the project would be released later that year. On April 4, McKinnon said via Twitter that the band might be recording. On May 9, they said at a live performance that their new album would be titled Common Courtesy. In September 2012, the band said it was working with Chad Gilbert, who had previously worked with them on Homesick (2009) and What Separates Me from You (2010). While recording Common Courtesy, the band played a hometown gig on November 21 as a celebration of the American Thanksgiving holiday.

A video counting down from the number 21 was posted on the band's website in early December; in the video, McKinnon stated, "this is some of the best material that we've written. I know people say that [about] every album but I know it is." On December 21, the band released the track "Violence (Enough Is Enough)", which was confirmed to be a track on Common Courtesy. McKinnon said the music video for "Violence (Enough Is Enough)" was planned to be filmed and released the same day, but the band was unable to do so. Despite producer Gilbert stating on October 17, 2012, the album might be finished within a week, the process was still only partly completed when "Violence (Enough Is Enough)" was released in December. According to McKinnon, the track is "really not meant to be political as it might sound [...] it's that feeling that things are out of your hands. I wanted it to have this dark, ominous feeling."

In an interview with Jennifer J. Walker of Kerrang!, McKinnon stated there would be only five heavy songs on the album. He explained that the goal for the album was to serve as a "reflection on our history, on how small-town kids playing music that doesn't really make sense to the world ended up on the main stages of some of the biggest music festivals around the world". In the same interview, McKinnon confirmed that the opening track was titled "City of Ocala". Work on the album was still in progress when McKinnon updated fans in February 2013; he later explained that the delay in releasing the project was not due to the band's lawsuit against Victory Records, but because of the large amount of material the band had created for the album and the difficulty of pooling what would be featured on the album. The group had recorded "three or four albums' worth" of material; McKinnon said, "If you're putting out 15-plus tracks on a record, that could be dangerous. It's hard for even your biggest fans to stay with you that long." In the February 2013 issue of Alternative Press, McKinnon said the band had 40 songs to work with, an unprecedented amount of material during the production of any of the band's albums alone.

According to McKinnon, the band members recorded at McKinnon's home studio and self-financed the recording. The home studio was constructed specifically for recording Common Courtesy; the band later christened it "Wade Studios". It cost US$40,000 for McKinnon and producer Andrew Wade to build; the other members paid $20,000 of the sum. Dan Korneff helped build equipment for the studio, such as audio compressors. Wade previously produced many parts of the band's last four albums: And Their Name Was Treason (2005), For Those Who Have Heart (2007), Homesick and What Separates Me from You. Korneff previously worked as a mixing engineer on What Separates Me from You. Wade and Korneff had a trial and error system based on Wade's likes and dislikes in a studio. Mastering was handled by Ted Jensen at Sterling Sound, while Ken Andrews mixed the recordings. The band's original guitarist, Tom Denney, attended the recording sessions and played during them as if he was another member of the band, though he was not credited as a performer in the album's credits.

On March 19, 2013, McKinnon announced that recording had completed and the album was being mixed. On the same day, the band's video editor Drew Russ posted a tweet saying he had "Wrapped up everything for the [A Day To Remember] Common Courtesy episodes". The next day, McKinnon again spoke with Radio.com; he said the band planned to promote the album with a heavy single such as "Violence" first, followed by "a more well-rounded song that appeals to everybody". Replying to fan via Twitter on July 22, McKinnon said the album was "still being mixed", but the mastering process was completed in September. Reflecting on the creation of the album in 2016, the band found the approach to the creative process on Common Courtesy tiresome given the lengthy process, the circumstances with Victory, and the resort to creating the project on their own, to the point band members often were left feeling uninvolved, unmotivated or uninspired, though they were happy with the content on the record.

== Music and lyrics ==
=== Style and influences ===
According to McKinnon, part of the reason the album contained so much material was because the band wanted to fully appeal to all sides of its fanbase: those who enjoyed the metal side of the band most, those who preferred the more alternative-leaning direction, and those who liked their acoustic ballads. "If It's a heavy song, make sure it's a heavy song that people are really gonna be happy with, and there's a huge chunk of our record that's just aimed at those people who are fans of our band. Then we've got pop punk songs, we've got more alternative rock songs, we've got even slower songs than we've ever done, we've got an acoustic song. It's everything that's ever been A Day to Remember times ten." Similarly, when asked in a different interview what creative direction the band was taking, McKinnon responded, "Every direction possible. [...] Everywhere we’ve been, everywhere we are, and everywhere we want to go."

In an interview with NME, McKinnon was asked about his inspiration for the album's material. He named three starkly different-sounding acts as examples of what he had been listening to during the making of the album: Mumford & Sons, Living with Lions and Coldplay. He clarified that while it was possible those artists would reflect as influences on the album, that "everything influences [him]" and that it would still be recognizable as a work which uniquely sounded like A Day to Remember. McKinnon also said Common Courtesy would "have more heavier songs than on the past two records [combined]," all the while maintaining balance with less heavy songs. Several songs include in-studio banter, which AllMusic reviewer Gregory Heaney called "a window into a creative process that sounds fun and relaxed".

The album as a whole has been described as pop-punk and metalcore. Revolver remarked that the "Violence (Enough is Enough)" sounded more metal-influenced than the band's previous work, to which McKinnon replied that the band had not had a "huge metal influence" since their album For Those Who Have Heart. Months later, by contrast to this original statement, the band added "Life Lessons Learned the Hard Way" to the album because the band felt the record lacked enough heaviness to balance out the other tracks.

=== Tracks ===
McKinnon, Denney and Wade wrote "the biggest songs on the album" in five days. Rhythm guitarist Neil Westfall said in an interview that the overarching theme of the album's content was about the events happening in the band's lives before and during the album's creation. "City of Ocala" is a recollection of the band's early history and a reflection upon their hometown of Ocala, Florida. "Right Back at It Again" was almost excluded from the album because it was one of the excess songs the band had recorded, but they thought the song sounded good enough that they were compelled to add it to the final track list anyway. "Sometimes You're the Hammer, Sometimes You're the Nail" was the last song written for the album; the band was unhappy with the second verse, which was rewritten four times until it was deemed satisfactory. "Dead & Buried", by contrast, was completed smoothly with few adjustments needed to the original take. "Best of Me" had, according to McKinnon, a Foo Fighters feel to it. It is the only song on the record that does not credit McKinnon as a writer of the music. "I'm Already Gone" was written while the band was touring with Bring Me the Horizon in the UK, (Note: The band toured with Bring Me the Horizon twice: an October 2009 tour in the UK and later on The Game Changers Tour in March–April 2011 in the U.S.) It was acoustically demoed two years prior to the album's creation; Skaff said it was nearly finished by that point bar an electric guitar idea, which had come from Wade, that was added.

"Violence (Enough Is Enough)" was the first song to be written for Common Courtesy; When McKinnon originally began writing "Violence (Enough Is Enough)", he said it represented a "feeling like you're helpless," but it eventually evolved into being "about [...] why people do terrible things to each other". "Life @ 11" came about during the pre-production stage of the album; McKinnon said, "this song kind of fell out of thin air". "I Surrender" was written "three or four years ago", but McKinnon disliked the original version. However, he liked the song enough to rework it during the sessions for the album. (Note: Based on the timing of the magazine issue, this would have placed the temporal origin of "I Surrender" around 2009.) "Life Lessons Learned the Hard Way", a heavier song on the album, was the last song to be written for the project and was added to give the record more stylistic balance. "End of Me" came about when McKinnon and Wade experimented in the studio with an acoustic guitar; according to McKinnon, "the song just came from something that [Wade] played on that I thought was so awesome that the vocal line came more or less immediately came to me".

"The Document Speaks for Itself" is the first song that was recorded for the album; it is about the band's lawsuit with Victory. An early edit of the song had an intro with a voicemail message left by Victory owner Tony Brummel saying he would sue the band. "I Remember" is another reflective song about the band, recounting their time on tours and other significant events it was involved with up until then.

== Release ==
=== Early promotion and delayed release ===
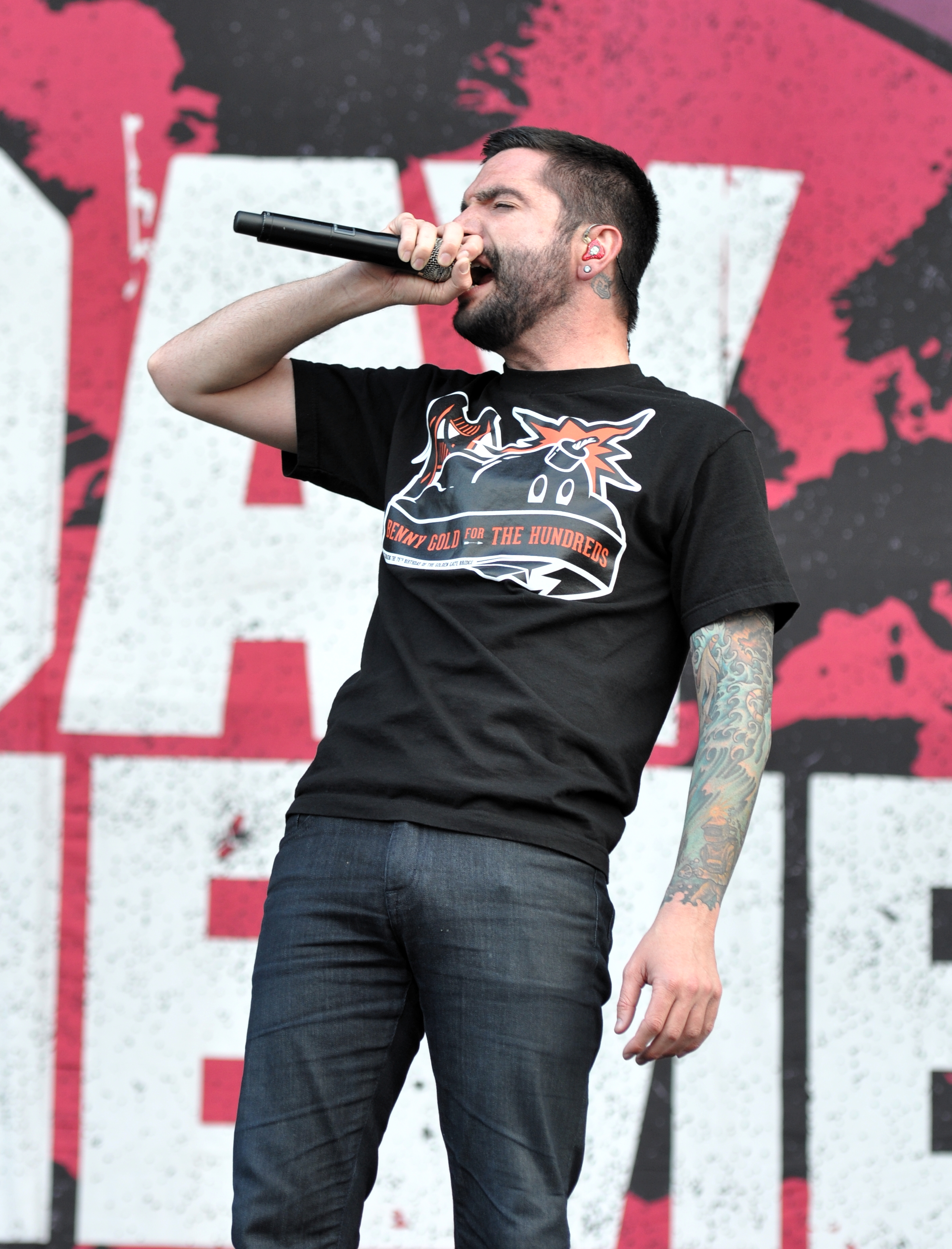
McKinnon performing with the band at Rock am Ring, June 2013

On January 21, 2013, the band announced their headlining Right Back at It Again Tour across North America. With support from Of Mice & Men, Chunk! No, Captain Chunk! and Issues, the tour started on March 20 and ended on May 4. Its namesake, "Right Back at It Again", was a new song which made its debut during these shows; the song had not yet been officially released. On May 17, the tour was extended to include Australian dates in July alongside The Devil Wears Prada and Dream On, Dreamer.

Ahead of the tour's March 31 stop in Grand Rapids, Michigan, McKinnon was interviewed by local radio station WGRD, who asked about a release date for the album. McKinnon replied that the band had not "set anything in stone", but that it had recently discussed the matter. He reiterated in the interview that the band was not focused on it at the time and was taking their time to release a quality product. The band was still unsure at the time if the album was going to be released by Victory, and that the lawsuit was still being settled. After the Right Back At It Again Tour, the band played at Rock am Ring in Germany that June. On July 23, it announced the House Party tour through North America, set to run from September 11 to October 24, 2013. The support acts were originally announced as Pierce the Veil and All Time Low, with The Wonder Years announced as another support act in early August 2013. The band debuted "Dead & Buried" on the first night of the tour.

=== Eventual release and later promotion ===
A promotional ad for the Common Courtesy 'The Series' web series

On August 16, 2013, the band's official Facebook page announced Common Courtesy The Series, a web series that was released on YouTube. (Note: The theme song for the web series is "Making History" by the Manly Masculine Men, a duo comprising Wade and Russ.) The first episode, which is titled "Black Crow", was released on August 23. The next day, it was announced Common Courtesy would be released on October 8. The second episode, "Golden Eagle", was released on August 30; featured in it is a rap song of the same name, which had a music video released for it on September 4. The song was a spin on Trinidad James's song "All Gold Everything". The third episode, titled "Guitar Vibes", was released in September; it was a joke on how the band was taking their time on recording the album. The fourth episode, "Spiritual Uplifting", was released September 15. The final episode, "The Finale", was released on September 23, as was the cover art for the album, with digital pre-orders beginning to be taken.

McKinnon revealed to Alternative Press in September that the project would be self-released; there was a plan to release the album which was temporarily halted by ongoing legal issues, but he added that "We don't care if we have to put out an album the day of October 8 and it's only available digitally". McKinnon announced the version of "Violence (Enough Is Enough)" that was posted in December was an unmixed version and that the lawsuit was still ongoing.

On October 4, it was announced the band had won the lawsuit against Victory, but that it was still contractually obliged to give the label at least two more albums. Victory uploaded a video called "The End begins October 8th 2013" to YouTube; some speculated this was a reference to the lawsuit with the band, but it was later revealed to be a teaser to an unrelated new song by Close Your Eyes. "Right Back at It Again" was announced on October 7 to be broadcast as part of BBC Radio 1's Rock Show the following midnight; the band called the song its "brand new single". A Day to Remember digitally self-released Common Courtesy on October 8, 2013. On October 17, the band announced the physical and iTunes releases would occur on November 25, with bonus tracks "Leave All the Lights On", "Good Things" and "Same Book But Never the Same Page". Radio stations began playing "Right Back at It Again" on November 11.

McKinnon, Skaff and guitarist Neil Westfall performed a surprise acoustic show for Warped Tour 2013 in London on November 17, and an acoustic set at Banquet Records the following day, also in London. Skaff said in an interview on November 24 the band was planning a week-long show of promotional acoustic sets throughout London and Germany through the rest of November, and with U.S. radio stations in December.

Physical editions of the album were released on November 25 in the U.S. and Europe by the band's own label, ADTR Records, (Note: Europe ADTR ADTR005/0602537638901) and in Australia in cooperation with 3Wise Records on November 29. (Note: Australia ADTR/3Wise 3WR038) In early December, it was announced the album had sold 92,874 copies in the U.S. in its first week of release, 40,550 copies from the digital release and 52,324 from the physical release. and toured the UK and Europe in January and February 2014. A marble-colored vinyl edition was released in the UK on February 10. (Note: UK/Europe ADTR ADTR009) On March 25, "End of Me" was released as a radio single. In September, the band performed at Chill on the Hill festival in Sterling Heights, Michigan, followed by a tour across America through September and October with Bring Me the Horizon, Motionless in White and Chiodos, dubbing the venture the Parks & Devastation Tour. On March 9, 2015, a music video was released for "City Of Ocala".

== Critical reception ==
Professional ratings
Aggregate scores
Source	Rating
Metacritic	80/100
Review scores
Source	Rating
AbsolutePunk	7/10
AllMusic	4/5
Alternative Press	3.5/5
Kerrang!	4/5
Rock Sound	9/10
Ultimate Guitar	7.3/10

Common Courtesy received a Metacritic aggregate score of 80, which indicates "generally favorable reviews" on their scale. AbsolutePunk reviewer Thomas Nassiff said McKinnon "chronicle[d] the last three years of his band's collective life", from the opening track to the last song "often reminisc[ing] on the band's beginnings". He said another recurring matter was "demanding respect", believing that the band consistently delivered its signature formula of pop-punk and metalcore. Gregory Heaney of AllMusic noted "an unfettered feel about the album that feels refreshing", which "once again puts the band's talent on display, showing off their impressive versatility as musicians and songwriters as they casually drift from punishing metalcore breakdowns to singalong choruses", choosing "Dead & Buried" as a standout. Writing for Alternative Press, Brendan Manley called the album "a classic ADTR record in every sense"; Manley favored the pop-punk songs, saying the genre "wins, providing the most memorable moments on the record". Manley noted the presence of constant "touches of the unmistakable chug-a-chug algorithm ADTR" the band had used on its earlier albums.

Kerrang! concluded their review of the album by saying, "Impressive act of defiance or not, when the dust has settled, this will also be rightly remembered as simply a great album." Rock Sound's Andy Ritchie called "Right Back at It Again" "unmistakably the 'All I Want' of Common Courtesy" and said lines in "Sometimes You're the Hammer, Sometimes You're the Nail" and "The Document Speaks for Itself" were digs at Victory. A staff writer for Ultimate Guitar noticed that throughout the album, the listener was engaged with stories about their history so that they knew the band better by the end of the album, but panned the band's metalcore efforts as "generic", praising the record's pop-punk songs by comparison.

== Commercial performance and accolades ==
Due to the way in which Common Courtesy was released, it was ineligible to chart within its first week of release on the Billboard 200, though it was predicted if it had been eligible, it would have debuted in the Top 10, having sold over 92,000 copies in the United States. It debuted at number 47 on Billboard 200 and peaked at number 37 three weeks later. As of July 2016, the album had sold 270,000 copies in the U.S.

Common Courtesy debuted on the UK album chart at number 57 and on the UK Rock & Metal Albums Chart at number 1. The album also charted at number 40 in Austria and at number 48 in Germany. "Right Back at It Again" peaked at number 33 on the Billboard Alternative Songs chart and at number 40 on the Mainstream Rock Songs chart. The album was placed at number four on Rock Sound's list of "The 50 Best Albums Of 2013". In 2016, Metal Hammer ranked the album as the band's second-best up to that point, behind only What Separates Me From You.

== Track listing ==
All lyrics are written by Jeremy McKinnon.

No.	Title	Music	Length
1.	"City of Ocala"	McKinnon; Tom Denney; Chad Gilbert	3:29
2.	"Right Back at It Again"	McKinnon; Denney; Neil Westfall; Andrew Wade	3:20
3.	"Sometimes You're the Hammer, Sometimes You're the Nail"	McKinnon; Denney; Westfall; Cody Quistad; Wade	4:34
4.	"Dead & Buried"	McKinnon; Denney; Gilbert	3:13
5.	"Best of Me"	Denney; Westfall; Kevin Skaff; Wade; Gilbert	3:27
6.	"I'm Already Gone"	McKinnon; Skaff; Wade	4:04
7.	"Violence (Enough Is Enough)"	McKinnon; Westfall; Denney; Skaff; Wade	4:01
8.	"Life @ 11"	McKinnon; Denney; Gilbert; Wade	3:22
9.	"I Surrender"	McKinnon; Gilbert; Wade	3:34
10.	"Life Lessons Learned the Hard Way"	McKinnon; Denney; Westfall	2:17
11.	"End of Me"	McKinnon; Wade; Gilbert	3:58
12.	"The Document Speaks for Itself"	McKinnon; Skaff; Westfall; Wade	4:43
13.	"I Remember"	McKinnon; Denney; Wade	9:04
Total length:			53:11

Bonus tracks
No.	Title	Music	Length
14.	"Leave All the Lights On"	McKinnon; Wade	3:31
15.	"Good Things"	McKinnon; Gilbert; Wade	2:59
16.	"Same Book But Never the Same Page"	McKinnon; Gilbert; Skaff; Westfall; Wade	4:04
Total length:			63:45

Physical edition bonus DVD – Common Courtesy – The Series

1. "Black Crow" – 7:27
2. "Guitar Vibes" – 8:00
3. "Spiritual Uplifting" – 7:34
4. "The Finale" – 7:29

== Personnel ==
Personnel per digital booklet.

A Day to Remember

- Jeremy McKinnon – lead vocals
- Josh Woodard – bass guitar
- Neil Westfall – rhythm guitar, backing vocals
- Alex Shelnutt – drums
- Kevin Skaff – lead guitar, backing vocals

Production

- Jeremy McKinnon, Andrew Wade, Chad Gilbert – producers
- Andrew Wade – engineer
- Ken Andrews – mixing
- Ted Jensen – mastering
- Jeremy McKinnon – art direction
- Tony Moore – front cover illustration
- Mike Cortada – back cover, album booklet and booklet illustration
- Adam Elmakias – photos
- Micah Bell – card & CC logo

== Charts ==
=== Weekly charts ===
Chart (2013–14)	Peak Position
Australian Albums Chart	13
Austrian Ö3 Top 40	40
Belgium Ultratop Album Chart	188
German Media Control Albums Chart	48
UK Album Chart	57
UK Album Download Chart	24
UK Official Record Store Chart	5
UK Rock & Metal Albums Chart	1
U.S. Billboard 200	37
U.S. Billboard Alternative Albums	5
U.S. Billboard Hard Rock Albums	1
U.S. Billboard Independent Albums	4
U.S. Billboard Rock Albums	8

=== Year-end charts ===
Chart (2014)	Position
US Billboard Independent Albums	19
US Billboard Alternative Albums	33
US Billboard Hard Rock Albums	13
US Billboard Rock Albums	50
