= What Separates Me from You =

- Original album artwork by Rob Dobi

Studio album by A Day to Remember
- Released: November 15, 2010
- Recorded: May–July 23, 2010
- Studios: The Wade Studios, Ocala, Florida
- Genres: Pop-punk; post-hardcore; metalcore
- Length: 32:52
- Label: Victory
- Producers: Chad Gilbert; Andrew Wade; Jeremy McKinnon

A Day to Remember chronology
Attack of the Killer B-Sides (2010)	What Separates Me from You (2010)	Common Courtesy (2013)

Singles from What Separates Me from You
- 1. "All I Want" Released: October 12, 2010; 2. "All Signs Point to Lauderdale" Released: May 24, 2011; 3. "It's Complicated" Released: October 25, 2011

What Separates Me from You is the fourth studio album by the American rock band A Day to Remember, and their third and final for Victory Records. Originally planned for release in late-October 2010, the album was delayed by a few weeks until mid-November. What Separates Me from You was released on November 15, 2010, in the UK, and on November 16 in the US. The album, which was recorded mainly at The Wade Studios in Ocala, Florida, from May to July 2010, was the first to feature guitarist Kevin Skaff. The album was produced mostly by Chad Gilbert, with help from Andrew Wade and the band's vocalist, Jeremy McKinnon. "All I Want" was released as the first single. It reached number 12 on the U.S. Alternative Songs chart and number 25 on the Rock Songs chart.

The album debuted on the U.S. Billboard 200 at number 11, and number 1 on several charts: Top Hard Rock Albums, Top Independent Albums, Top Modern Rock/Alternative Albums in the U.S. and the Rock Album Chart in the UK. The band played two songs from the album on their national TV debut in January 2011, and then went on The Game Changers Tour to help promote the album; shortly afterwards touring worldwide in support of the release. Two later singles off the album charted: "All Signs Point to Lauderdale", released in May, reached number 32 on the Hot Modern Rock Tracks chart, and radio single "It's Complicated", released in October, peaked at number 34 on the same chart. What Separates Me from You was met with generally favorable reviews, with critics praising the album's sound. The album was certified Gold by the RIAA in March 2016, and "All I Want" was certified gold in August. The album was certified Silver in the UK by the BPI.

== Background ==
While the band was touring Homesick (2009), a line-up change occurred when guitarist Tom Denney wanted to settle down. Four Letter Lie guitarist Kevin Skaff was added in his place; Denney, however, was retained to work with the band behind the scenes. All of the songs for What Separates Me from You were written while the band was touring in 2009 and 2010, and as early as March 2010, vocalist Jeremy McKinnon stated that A Day to Remember already had "all of the pop/punk song ideas written [...] And we're then going to write five heavier songs".

== Music and lyrics ==
=== Styles and amount of material ===
Musically, the album has been described as pop-punk, post-hardcore, and metalcore. Guitarist Neil Westfall said in a 2010 interview with Alter the Press!: "We've written a few jams, we're always constantly writing, like I think we wrote some parts the other day." Westfall also said once the band returned home from touring, they were "going to drop everything and start writing and doing pre-production full time." At this point, the band had ten songs and was trying to condense them into five, then planning to write five more. Westfall said the band completed the final "few songs when we were back home with Tom (Denney) and Chad (Gilbert)." On the pace of writing, McKinnon said: "It seems like a really fast thing that has happened but we've been constantly working on it the entire time." On the songs themselves, he said: "the pop-punk stuff has a darker edge to it. I wrote it like that, it's still pop-punk but with a darker edge". The album was influenced by Finch's What It Is to Burn (2002). The album "came together song by song" as McKinnon mentioned, with the band coming up with 15–16 song ideas. McKinnon stated in an interview with Rocksound that there's songs "that didn't make this record that we're saving." There is a track on the album that was previously written for Homesick.

When asked about how he comes up with song titles, McKinnon said: "I've got my iPhone, and I go on my notes and every time I see something I like I write it down, so a lot of the time titles are something that mean something to us only, or to someone I know only." He called What Separates Me from You "the slowest for stuff like that", when referring to song titles. Westfall said that the album's title and the songs' subjects were about "Separating your self from your peers and really coming into your own." McKinnon said What Separates Me from You was "a lot more personal and darker" than Homesick, and that it was "a natural progression of what we were doing" with "the same core" as the band's preceding albums. Asked whether the album reached new heights, he said it "was definitely the next step" for the band. However, the band originally had no idea on how the album would turn out: "It was a little bit all over the place, because of me coming in, Tom [Denney] leaving and all this new stuff that was going on", as stated by guitarist Kevin Skaff. Skaff said that McKinnon originally really wanted to name the album Always the Hard Way, but later realized that the hardcore band Terror had already used that title for an album.

=== Songs ===
It was important to the band that "Sticks & Bricks" opened the album, as it was an "in-your-face" song. McKinnon said in an interview with USAToday that the opening lyric ("I am fueled by all forms of failure") was "100% directed at everyone who ever doubted our band". He stated that it "is one of the meaner, heavier songs that we've ever done as a band." "All I Want" is "about being in a band", according to McKinnon, and was one of the final songs written for the album. The song came about from an idea by McKinnon that he expanded on guitar in the middle of recording for the album, and wrote most of it in one night. A rough version was recorded between McKinnon and producer Chad Gilbert before the band had arrived at the studio. McKinnon said the song was more of a "singing version" of the band's song "I'm Made of Wax, Larry, What Are You Made Of?".

"It's Complicated" was written while the band were abroad in Amsterdam; the original version differed significantly from the final version. Andrew Wade flew out to the band in an attempt to work on the song immediately. "This Is the House That Doubt Built" was one of the first to be written for the album, written almost in one sitting while McKinnon had his acoustic guitar with him, while the band was abroad. "2nd Sucks" was about people who viewed being in a band as being a sort of competition.

"Better Off This Way" was one of the first written for the album, and re-written "at least 3 different times". The song was the final one finished for the album. The title for "All Signs Point to Lauderdale" came from an occasion when McKinnon and bassist Joshua Woodard were in a rough neighborhood in West Palm Beach, Florida. A piece of the song came from a recording session for Homesick when Gilbert said he had an idea for the melody, which McKinnon took a while to write over: "Chad had a cool idea, vocally, for something". In an interview with PopCrush in 2011, McKinnon said the song was when you get the "feeling like you're stuck in a place that's leading you nowhere" and "standing up for yourself and taking charge of your life." "You Be Tails, I'll Be Sonic" was written with the band's former guitarist, Tom Denney; the song was made up of several separate pieces from different song ideas, with a chorus McKinnon had re-written 4 times.

Referring to "You Be Tails, I'll Be Sonic", Skaff said that the song's title—a reference to Tails and Sonic from the video game series—had "really came out of nowhere." McKinnon said the song is a "more personal song [...] It discusses how the choices I've made to put my best foot forward in my career, in a sense, have really done damage to my personal life." Both "You Be Tails, I'll Be Sonic" and "Out of Time" talk about "how I feel like I'm doing what I want with my life, but I think, "Wow, I just did something that really affected me."" "Out of Time" was also one of the first songs written for the album, and was written while the band was in Australia. McKinnon said the song was the most personal on the record. Skaff had a major hand in writing "If I Leave". The song describes "different things you got through being on the road" and "a relationship ending when you're not really around enough to actually take care of it in person." On being asked whether he knew it would be the final song on the album, McKinnon said "It just felt right [...] seemed like a good ending".

== Recording ==
We'll bring like a speaker, a guitar amp simulator, microphones, he'll [Andrew Wade] just write the drums on the computer, and we'll just demo the songs out like that. When we get back, we'll track everything fully, and Alex (Shelnutt - drummer) will use his magic and do whatever he does behind the drums.

— Neil Westfall, on pre-production, 2010

Before showing the songs to the band, McKinnon and Skaff worked on them alone. When the pair had all of the song ideas, they worked on them as a full-band, with pre-production being undertaken in, as Skaff commented, "a makeshift studio" by Andrew Wade. Woodard commented that the band had "been going in from 11am until 9pm and all we do is sit around and play." Between demoing the songs, and their final forms on the album, Woodard said "crazy things were happening – verses became choruses", with Chad Gilbert assisting the band with arrangements and writing. As the band thought they were getting better as songwriters, Woodard stated, "it's getting more heavy and more pop." One song that the band recorded was "screwed up really bad and it didn't make the record", as Skaff comments, as the group recorded it at a fast pace and when McKinnon tried to "sing it was like rap music. [imitates rap singing] And we were like 'that's not good'." Asked if the band would use it as a possible B-side, Skaff said "its possible [...] might use it for the next record or something like that."

What Separates Me from You was recorded from May to July 23, 2010, in three locations, per the album booklet: The Wade Studios in Ocala, Florida, The Back of a Bus with No AC in Germany and A Closet in New Jersey, the latter of which being where the backing vocals for "All Signs Point to Lauderdale" were recorded. The album was mixed by David Bendeth and Dan Korneff, and produced by Gilbert with assistance by Wade and McKinnon. Wade also produced the band's previous album, Homesick. It was the first album featuring Skaff on guitar, following Tom Denney's departure after Homesick. "All I Want", "It's Complicated", "This Is the House That Doubt Built" and "If I Leave" were mixed by Bendeth, while the rest of the album tracks were mixed by Korneff. Mastering for the album had taken place at Sterling Sound by Ted Jensen.

== Release ==
In July 2010, it was announced that the band would bring out the album in October. The album's title and cover art were revealed by the band in a live video via Victory Record's official website on September 21. On the same day, the album was available for pre-order. McKinnon later said in an interview that the album's cover was meant "to be a little more serious. It has the vibe of a painting." Featured on the album cover is the band's ex-guitarist Denney, video director Drew Russ, and producer Gilbert. A supposed track listing for the album was posted on the internet with mentions of guest appearances by Ed McRae (Note: McRae released a statement on October 4, 2010 saying that he would not appear on the album.) and Florence Welch, from Your Demise and Florence and the Machine respectively. (Note: Track listing was posted as follows: "The Day That Left Us Love", "Months & Years", "Falling", "Irreplace (Able)", "What Separates Me from You", "You’ve Got No Chance", "The Sirens Break Me Down" (feat. Ed McRae of Your Demise), "Ride of Our Live", "Nobody Does Empty-Promises My Dear", "Reminisce the Past", "Eye in the Hole" (feat. Florence Welch of Florence and the Machine), and "Cracked Mirrors, Stopped Clocks".) McKinnon said it wasn't the true track list, then proceeded to post the actual track list on October 13. On October 1, the band held a contest, to tie in with the release of the album, where fans could win their catalog on vinyl and a signed copy of the album. The group released a short preview of new song "2nd Sucks" on October 6. On October 7, the album's first single, "All I Want", was debuted on KROQ Radio. The single was officially released on October 12. As the choice of a single, Westfall said "All I Want" "was a great transition song from Homesick". On October 21, a full version of "2nd Sucks" was posted for streaming on Victory's Facebook page.

[What was the inspiration for the title?] The album's about what choices you make and the things that come with them, whether it be losing out on a relationship or losing a family member. It's just about lifestyle choices and all the good and bad things that come with it.

— Kevin Skaff, speaking in 2010

Originally set for release on October 26, 2010, the album was delayed until November 15 in the UK and the proceeding day in the U.S. (Note: Catalog number: U.S. Victory VR603) The album was leaked a few days prior to release. A listening party for the album was held at The Hard Rock Hotel in Chicago on November 15 for a small number of fans, which was followed by a Q&A session with the band. On January 6, 2011, the band released the music video for the single "All I Want". The video, which was filmed back in October 2010, features members from numerous musical groups. On January 11, 2011, the band made their national television debut while performing the songs "All I Want" and "Better Off This Way" on Jimmy Kimmel Live!. Skaff recalled the TV performance as "fun", calling Jimmy Kimmel "a good guy", and "a great experience" to be on Kimmel's show. Beginning in March, to help promote What Separates Me from You, the band went on The Game Changers Tour. (Note: The Game Changers Tour lasted from March 10 to May 1, 2011, it was headlined by A Day to Remember and featured Bring Me the Horizon, We Came as Romans and Pierce the Veil. One show, the March 15 performance at Irving Plaza in New York, was billed as "An Evening with A Day to Remember". It was a showcasing of songs from the band's complete catalog across an acoustic and electric set.) The band performed over half of the new album while on The Game Changers tour. McKinnon commented: "The new songs live have worked great."

On April 16, 2011, A Day to Remember released a special for Record Store Day, which was an exclusive limited edition 7" vinyl of "All I Want". "All Signs Point to Lauderdale" impacted radio on May 24. The band filmed the music video for "All Signs Point to Lauderdale" in one day in Los Angeles when the group had a day-off from touring; it was released through MTV2 on June 7. It was revealed in September that "It's Complicated" would be released as the third single from the album on October 25, though it was only released as a radio single. "2nd Sucks" would become the band's third music video off the album. A promotional CD of "This Is the House That Doubt Built" was released on December 19. The band played an acoustic version of "It's Complicated" for MTV on February 14, 2012. The music video for "2nd Sucks" was released on February 27, 2012.

== Further releases and song appearances ==
Vinyl editions were released on December 6, 2010. (Note: The vinyl was printed in colors of: Neon Green (300 copies), Tan (Sand) (950 copies), and Clear Smoke (100 copies).) Several tracks from the album have appeared in MTV's show Jersey Shore. Another vinyl pressing, this time on white vinyl, was released on December 27. Two tracks were featured on various artist compilations: "All Signs Point to Lauderdale" on SideOneDummy's Warped Tour 2011 Tour Compilation and "If I Leave" on the Victory compilation Victory Records 2012 New Music Sampler. Six of the album's ten tracks are currently available on the Rock Band games: "2nd Sucks", "All I Want", "All Signs Point to Lauderdale", "Better Off This Way", "Sticks & Bricks", and "It's Complicated".

== Reception ==
Professional ratings
Review scores
Source	Rating
AllMusic	4/5 stars
Alternative Press	4.5/5 stars
Blare Magazine	3/5 stars
Loud Online	50%
Punknews.org	4/10
Rock Sound	8/10
Sputnikmusic	3.0/5

What Separates Me from You received generally favorable reviews. James Christopher Monger of Allmusic said, "[It] is whiney, petulant, immature, hopeless, and thoroughly addicting, as the ten songs contained within the gatefold packaging [...] are as immaculately crafted and engaging as they are blindingly self-absorbed." Brendan Manley from Alternative Press wrote, "The vitriolic delivery seems sincere, but even if you don’t buy into all of the personal/emotional factors underpinning Separates (smack-talking the smack-talkers/a recent, devastating breakup/assorted perils of touring), the album simply kills." Sputnikmusic called the album "Homesick Pt. 2 is (a little) better than Homesick Pt. 1".

However, Christine Caruana of Loud Online said, "[It] is very much typical of its genre. Lyrics filled with standard teenage angst, fast, distorted guitars and heavy, yet boring, drum fills to imitate a metal sound." While Dan Rankin of Blare Magazine said the album was "essentially just another fat kid on the already rusty trampoline that is this genre." Brooke Daly of Tastemakers said that the album was one of the band's "more solid releases" with less repetition than on Homesick. Despite "taking on a poppier sound" being risky in his opinion, the band managed to "pull it off". Jacob Testa, for Mind Equals Blown, noted that he found himself "wanting to listen to it again and again", saying that the album featured "a lot of creativity and maturation".

Amy Bangs of Rock Sound stated, "while cynics will call a poppier foundation too commercially driven, their (musically) upbeat moments make it clear how creative they’ve been with arrangements and production, making no two verses, choruses or breakdowns sound alike." Punknews.org was less positive stating, "every chorus has a catchy hook; every breakdown sounds the same; and the lyrics are pretty terrible."

=== Commercial performance and accolades ===
The album peaked at number 11 on the U.S. Billboard 200, becoming A Day to Remember's personal best, as Homesick peaked at number 21. The album also charted at number 1 on the UK Rock Album Chart, number 66 on the UK Albums Chart, number 24 on the ARIA Chart in Australia, and number 4 on the German Newcomer Chart. "All I Want" charted on both Billboard's Hot Modern Rock Tracks and Rock Songs charts, at number 12 and number 25, respectively. "It's Complicated" charted on the Hot Modern Rock Tracks chart, at number 34. The album had sold 80,000 copies as of December 2010, with 152,000 copies in the U.S. as of April 2011, and 300,000 copies by January 2013. In March 2016, What Separates Me from You was certified gold in the U.S. In August, "All I Want" was certified gold. In December, the album was certified silver in the UK.

The album was voted by fans as number 3 of Kill Your Stereo's Album of the Year 2010. Matt Heafy, frontman and guitarist of the metal band Trivium, listed the album as the 6th best album of 2010. Trey Treman of Shadows Chasing Ghosts ranked the album one of his top 15 albums of 2010. "All Signs Point to Lauderdale" charted on both of these charts, but at number 32 and number 48, respectively. "All Signs Point to Lauderdale" was voted as number 10 in the "10 Best Rock Songs of 2011" by AOL Radio. Cleveland.com ranked "All Signs Point to Lauderdale" at number 59 on their list of the top 100 pop-punk songs.

== Track listing ==
All lyrics written by Jeremy McKinnon, except "2nd Sucks".

No.	Title	Music	Length
1.	"Sticks & Bricks"	Jeremy McKinnon, Kevin Skaff, Neil Westfall	3:16
2.	"All I Want"	McKinnon, Skaff	3:22
3.	"It's Complicated"	McKinnon, Skaff, Westfall	2:57
4.	"This Is the House That Doubt Built"	McKinnon, Skaff, Chad Gilbert	3:30
5.	"2nd Sucks"	Tom Denney, McKinnon, Skaff, Gilbert	2:27
6.	"Better Off This Way"	McKinnon, Skaff	3:26
7.	"All Signs Point to Lauderdale"	Denney, McKinnon, Skaff, Gilbert	3:17
8.	"You Be Tails, I'll Be Sonic"	Denney, McKinnon, Skaff, Westfall	3:47
9.	"Out of Time"	McKinnon, Skaff	3:26
10.	"If I Leave"	Skaff, McKinnon, Gilbert	3:24
Total length:			32:52

15th Anniversary Limited Edition Bonus Track
No.	Title	Music	Length
11.	"All I Want (Acoustic)"	Jeremy McKinnon, Kevin Skaff	3:19

== Personnel ==
Personnel per booklet.

A Day to Remember

- Jeremy McKinnon — vocals
- Joshua Woodard — bass
- Neil Westfall — guitar, backing vocals
- Alex Shelnutt — drums
- Kevin Skaff — guitar, backing vocals

Production

- Chad Gilbert — producer
- Andrew Wade and Jeremy McKinnon — co-producers
- David Bendeth — mixing engineer
- Dan Korneff — mixing engineer
- Ted Jensen — mastering engineer
- Andrew Wade — engineer
- Jeremy McKinnon — art direction
- Rob Dobi — digi pack illustrations
- Mike Cortada — inside booklet
- Doublej — layout

== Charts ==
=== Weekly charts ===
Chart (2010)	Peak Position
Australian Albums (ARIA)	24
German Newcomer Chart	4
UK Albums (Official Charts)	66
UK Rock & Metal Albums (Official Charts)	1
US Billboard 200	11
US Digital Albums (Billboard)	4
US Independent Albums (Billboard)	1
US Top Alternative Albums (Billboard)	1
US Top Hard Rock Albums (Billboard)	1
US Top Rock Albums (Billboard)	2
US Indie Store Album Sales (Billboard)	8

=== Year-end charts ===
Chart (2010)	Position
U.S. Billboard 200 Albums Year-end	184
U.S. Billboard Top Alternative Albums Year-end	26
U.S. Billboard Top Hard Rock Albums Year-end	6
U.S. Billboard Top Independent Albums Year-end	9
U.S. Billboard Top Rock Albums Year-end	34

== Certifications ==
Certifications for What Separates Me From You
Region	Certification	Certified units/sales
United Kingdom (BPI)	Silver	60,000^{‡}
United States (RIAA)	Gold	500,000^{‡}
^{‡} Sales+streaming figures based on certification alone.
