= Right Back at It Again =

Single by A Day to Remember

from the album Common Courtesy
- Released: November 11, 2013
- Recorded: May 2012 – March 2013, Jeremy McKinnon's home studio, Ocala, Florida
- Genre: Pop-punk
- Length: 3:20
- Label: ADTR
- Songwriters: Jeremy McKinnon, Alex Shelnutt, Kevin Skaff, Neil Westfall, Joshua Woodard
- Producers: Jeremy McKinnon, Andrew Wade, Chad Gilbert

A Day to Remember singles chronology
"It's Complicated" (2011)	"Right Back at It Again" (2013)	"End of Me" (2014)

"Right Back at It Again" is the second track and the first single from A Day to Remember's fifth album, Common Courtesy (2013). In October 20, 2015, the song was featured in Activision rhythm-music game, Guitar Hero Live.

== Music and lyrics ==
Vocalist, Jeremy McKinnon wrote the lyrics, while the music was written by McKinnon, former guitarist Tom Denney, guitarist Neil Westfall and producer Andrew Wade. "Right Back at It Again" almost wasn't included on the album as it was one of the excess songs the band had recorded, "we realised that it sounded great, so on it went."

== Release and reception ==
"Right Back at It Again" was announced on October 7, 2013 to be broadcast as part of BBC Radio 1's Rock Show the following midnight, with the band calling the song their "brand new single". The song impacted radio on November 11. "Right Back at It Again" charted at number 33 on the Alternative Songs chart. McKinnon, Westfall and guitarist Kevin Skaff performed a surprise acoustic show for Warped Tour 2013 UK on November 17, and another acoustic set, this time at Banquet Records the following day, both in London; band played "Right Back at It Again" on both occasions.

Tamsyn Wilce for Alter the Press! noted that the way "Right Back at it Again" follows on from opening track "City of Ocala" "continues the catchy hardcore beats" that is present in all of the band's albums. Rock Sound's Andy Ritchie called the song "unmistakably the 'All I Want' of 'Common Courtesy'". A music video for the song was released on 19 December 2013. The music video was nominated for Best Video at the Kerrang! Awards.

== Track listing ==
Promotional CD

1. "Right Back at It Again" (alternative edit)
2. "Right Back at It Again" (active rock edit)

== Personnel ==
Personnel per digital booklet.

A Day to Remember

- Jeremy McKinnon — lead vocals
- Josh Woodard — bass guitar
- Neil Westfall — rhythm guitar
- Alex Shelnutt — drums
- Kevin Skaff — lead guitar and vocals

Production

- Jeremy McKinnon, Andrew Wade, Chad Gilbert — producers
- Andrew Wade – engineer
- Ken Andrews – mixing
- Ted Jensen – mastering

== Chart positions ==
Chart (2013–14)	Peak position
US Alternative Airplay (Billboard)	33
US Mainstream Rock (Billboard)	36
