= End of Me (A Day to Remember song) =

Single by A Day to Remember

from the album Common Courtesy
- Released: March 25, 2014
- Recorded: May 2012 – March 2013
- Studio: Jeremy McKinnon's home studio, Ocala, Florida
- Length: 3:58
- Label: ADTR
- Songwriter(s): Jeremy McKinnon, Andrew Wade, Chad Gilbert
- Producer(s): McKinnon, Wade, Gilbert

A Day to Remember singles chronology
"Right Back at It Again" (2013)	"End of Me" (2014)	"Paranoia" (2016)

"End of Me" is the second single from A Day to Remember's fifth album, Common Courtesy, released in 2013. It was released to radio on March 25, 2014.

== Music and lyrics ==
The song came about from singer Jeremy McKinnon and producer Andrew Wade messing around in the studio with an acoustic guitar: "the song just came from something that he [Wade] played on that I thought was so awesome that the vocal line came more or less immediately came to me."

== Music video ==
A music video for the song, directed by Shane Drake, was released on 23 June 2014.

== Track listing ==
1. "End of Me" – 3:58

== Personnel ==
Personnel per digital booklet.

A Day to Remember

- Jeremy McKinnon — lead vocals
- Josh Woodard — bass guitar
- Neil Westfall — rhythm guitar
- Alex Shelnutt — drums
- Kevin Skaff — lead guitar and vocals

Production

- Jeremy McKinnon, Andrew Wade, Chad Gilbert — producers
- Andrew Wade – engineer
- Ken Andrews – mixing
- Ted Jensen – mastering

== Chart positions ==
Chart (2014)	Peak position
US Alternative Airplay (Billboard)	40
US Mainstream Rock (Billboard)	26
