= It's Complicated (A Day to Remember song) =

Single by A Day to Remember

from the album What Separates Me from You
- Released: October 25, 2011 (radio single)
- Recorded: May–July 2010, The Wade Studio, Ocala, Florida
- Genre: Pop-punk
- Length: 2:57
- Label: Victory
- Songwriters: Jeremy McKinnon, Alex Shelnutt, Kevin Skaff, Neil Westfall, Joshua Woodard
- Producers: Chad Gilbert, Andrew Wade, Jeremy McKinnon

A Day to Remember singles chronology
"All Signs Point to Lauderdale" (2011)	"It's Complicated" (2011)	"Right Back at It Again" (2013)

"It's Complicated" is the third single from A Day to Remember's fourth album, What Separates Me from You, released on October 25, 2011.

== Music and lyrics ==
Lead vocalist, Jeremy McKinnon wrote the lyrics, while the music was written by himself, guitarists Kevin Skaff and Neil Westfall, and A Day to Remember.

== Release and performances ==
The song, along with 3 others from the album, was mixed by David Bendeth. In September 2011, it was revealed that "It's Complicated" would be released as the third single from the album on October 25, though it was only released as a radio single. "It's Complicated " charted on Billboard's Hot Modern Rock Tracks chart, at number 34. The band played an acoustic version of "It's Complicated" for MTV on February 14, 2012. "It's Complicated" is available to play on the Rock Band games.

Liz Ramanand from Loudwire said the song had "catchy guitar riffs" and the song's style being "a poppy punk feel". Ramanand also called the song an "anthem for the brokenhearted" that "will get fists pumping" and the chorus "very appealing".

== Track listing ==
Digital download

1. "It's Complicated" – 2:57

Promotional CD

1. "It's Complicated (Radio Edit)" – 2:46
2. "It's Complicated (Album Version)" – 2:57

== Chart positions ==
Chart (2011)	Peak Position
U.S. Billboard Alternative Songs	34
U.S. Billboard Mainstream Rock Songs	38

== Personnel ==
Personnel per album booklet.

A Day to Remember

- Jeremy McKinnon — vocals
- Joshua Woodard — bass
- Neil Westfall — rhythm guitar
- Alex Shelnutt — drums
- Kevin Skaff — lead guitar, backing vocals

Production

- Chad Gilbert — producer
- Andrew Wade and Jeremy McKinnon — co-producers
- David Bendeth — mixing engineer
- Ted Jensen — mastering engineer
- Andrew Wade — engineer
