= All Signs Point to Lauderdale =

Single by A Day to Remember

from the album What Separates Me from You
- Released: May 24, 2011
- Recorded: May–July 2010, The Wade Studio, Ocala, Florida
- Genre: Pop-punk
- Length: 3:17
- Label: Victory
- Songwriters: Tom Denney, Chad Gilbert, Jeremy McKinnon, Alex Shelnutt, Kevin Skaff, Neil Westfall
- Producers: Chad Gilbert, Andrew Wade, Jeremy McKinnon

A Day to Remember singles chronology
| "All I Want" (2010) | "All Signs Point to Lauderdale" (2011) | "It's Complicated" (2011) |

"All Signs Point to Lauderdale" is the second single from A Day to Remember's fourth album, What Separates Me from You, released on June 7, 2011.

== Music and lyrics ==
Lead vocalist, Jeremy McKinnon wrote the lyrics, while the music was written by Tom Denney, McKinnon, guitarist Kevin Skaff, producer Chad Gilbert and A Day to Remember. The title came from an occasion when McKinnon and bassist Joshua Woodard were in a rough neighborhood in West Palm Beach, Florida. The pair were walking down Drexel Road in the early hours of the morning; they looked up to notice signs saying "Fort Lauderdale". In an interview with PopCrush in 2011, McKinnon said "All Signs Point to Lauderdale" was when you get the "feeling like you're stuck in a place that's leading you nowhere" and "standing up for yourself and taking charge of your life." The song talks "about being young and stuck in a town that you feel like you don't belong in. Sometimes, you feel like you want to get away from everything and everybody and do your own thing."

== Release and reception ==
The song impacted radio on May 24, 2011. The music video for the song was filmed in one day in Los Angeles when the group had a day-off from touring. The idea for which came from the band's management. The music video premiered on MTV2 on June 7, 2011. "All Signs Point to Lauderdale" charted on both Billboard's Hot Modern Rock Tracks and Rock Songs charts, at number 32 and number 48, respectively. The track was voted as number 10 in the "10 Best Rock Songs of 2011" by AOL Radio. "All Signs Point to Lauderdale" is available as downloadable content for Rock Band games. The song was included on Warped Tour 2011 Tour Compilation. Rick Florino of Artistdirect called the song "incisive and infectious".

== Track listing ==
Digital download

1. "All Signs Point to Lauderdale" – 3:17

Promotional CD

1. "All Signs Point to Lauderdale (Radio Edit)" – 3:17

== Chart positions ==
| Chart (2011) | Peak Position |
|---|---|
| U.S. Billboard Alternative Songs | 32 |
| U.S. Billboard Rock Songs | 48 |

== Certifications ==
Certifications for "All Signs Point to Lauderdale"
| Region | Certification | Certified units/sales |
|---|---|---|
| United Kingdom (BPI) | Silver | 200,000^{‡} |
^{‡} Sales+streaming figures based on certification alone.

== Personnel ==
Personnel per album booklet.

A Day to Remember

- Jeremy McKinnon — vocals
- Joshua Woodard — bass
- Neil Westfall — rhythm guitar
- Alex Shelnutt — drums
- Kevin Skaff — lead guitar, backing vocals

Production

- Chad Gilbert — producer
- Andrew Wade and Jeremy McKinnon — co-producers
- Dan Korneff — mixing engineer
- Ted Jensen — mastering engineer
- Andrew Wade— engineer
