= All I Want (A Day to Remember song) =

First single by A Day to Remember

- Illustration by Mike C. Hardcore

Single by A Day to Remember

from the album What Separates Me from You
- B-side: "All I Want" (acoustic)
- Released: October 12, 2010 (radio single)
- Recorded: May–July 2010
- Studio: The Wade Studio, Ocala, Florida
- Genre: Punk rock
- Length: 3:22
- Label: Victory
- Songwriters: Jeremy McKinnon; Alex Shelnutt; Kevin Skaff; Neil Westfall; Joshua Woodard
- Producers: Chad Gilbert; Andrew Wade; Jeremy McKinnon

A Day to Remember singles chronology
"Have Faith in Me" (2010)	"All I Want" (2010)	"All Signs Point to Lauderdale" (2011)

"All I Want" is the first single by A Day to Remember from their fourth studio album What Separates Me from You. It was released officially to radio stations in October 2010, and as a commercial single, though only as a limited edition 7" vinyl, in April 2011. In August 2016, the song was certified gold in the U.S. by the RIAA.

== Composition ==
Unlike the band's more-known metalcore sound which incorporates growling vocals and breakdowns, the song uses almost none of these attributes, and instead shows a direction towards fast-paced pop punk with clean vocals. Lead vocalist Jeremy McKinnon wrote the lyrics, while the music was written by himself, guitarist Kevin Skaff and A Day to Remember. McKinnon stated that the song is about "taking chances, and doing what you think is right regardless of what people might think. To be honest, whats more important? Live life, and be happy with yourself". McKinnon said in a 2011 interview with USA Today that the song is also "about being in a band." The song, along with three others from the album, was mixed by David Bendeth. As the choice of a single, guitarist Neil Westfall said "All I Want" "was a great transition song from 'Homesick'".

== Music video ==
The music video for the song, which was filmed in October 2010, was released on January 6, 2011. It features cameos of numerous popular bands and musicians. The cameos are: Tom Denney (A Day to Remember's former guitarist), Pete Wentz, Winston McCall of Parkway Drive, The Devil Wears Prada, Bring Me the Horizon, Sam Carter of Architects, Crime In Stereo, This Is Hell, Dallas Taylor from Maylene and the Sons of Disaster, Silverstein, Andrew W.K., August Burns Red, Seventh Star, Matt Heafy of Trivium, Vic Fuentes of Pierce the Veil, Mike Herrera of MxPx, Vincent Bennet of The Acacia Strain, Veara, and Set Your Goals. Rock Sound called the video "quite excellent".

== Release ==
The song was released as a radio single on October 12, 2010, although it premiered a week earlier on October 7 on KROQ-FM radio's website, which gave the site its most web traffic ever. "All I Want" charted on both Billboard's Hot Modern Rock Tracks and Hot Rock Songs charts, at number 12 and number 25, respectively. A few days after the release of the music video for song, the band went on Jimmy Kimmel Live!, on January 11, 2011, and it became their national television debut on which they performed "All I Want" and "Better Off This Way". On April 16, the band released an exclusive 7" vinyl single of the song, especially for Record Store Day. The vinyl pressing was limited to 2,000 copies for the U.S. (Note: Purple: VR634) and 1,000 copies for the international release (Note: Mint green: VR634, VR634-7V-MG) and featured an acoustic version of "All I Want" as the B-side. The acoustic version was recorded at The Wade Studios, and was mixed by Andrew Wade. "All I Want" is available to play on the Rock Band games as well as Rocksmith 2014. The song is also used as the theme song of Total Nonstop Action Pay Per View Victory Road 2011.

== Track listing ==
Digital download

1. "All I Want" – 3:22

Promotional CD

1. "All I Want" (album version) – 3:23
2. "All I Want" (screamless) – 3:21

7" vinyl

1. "All I Want" – 3:22
2. "All I Want" (acoustic) – 3:14

== Personnel ==
Personnel per "All I Want" 7" sleeve.

A Day to Remember

- Josh Woodard – bass, backing vocals
- Neil Westfall – rhythm guitar, backing vocals
- Jeremy McKinnon – vocals
- Alex Shelnutt – drums
- Kevin Skaff – lead guitar, second vocals in acoustic version

Production

- Chad Gilbert – producer
- Andrew Wade and Jeremy McKinnon – co-producers
- David Bendeth – mixing
- Mike C. Hardcore – illustrations
- Jeremy Saffer – band photo
- Doublej – layout
- Jeremy McKinnon – art direction

== Chart positions ==
=== Peak positions ===
Chart (2010)	Peak position
Canada Billboard Canada Rock	50
U.K. Official Charts Company UK Rock & Metal Singles Chart	8
U.S. Billboard Alternative Songs	12
U.S. Billboard Hot Rock Songs	25
U.S. Billboard Mainstream Rock Songs	21
U.S. Billboard Rock Digital Songs	23

=== Year-end charts ===
Chart (2011)	Position
U.S. Billboard Alternative Songs Year-end	41

== Certifications ==
Region	Certification	Certified units/sales
United Kingdom (BPI)	Silver	200,000^{‡}
United States (RIAA)	Gold	500,000^{‡}
^{‡} Sales+streaming figures based on certification alone.
