= All Is Beautiful... Because We're Doomed =

Studio album by We Came as Romans
- Released: August 22, 2025; November 6, 2026 (Circularity deluxe edition)
- Recorded: 2025
- Genres: Alternative metal; metalcore
- Length: 41:00
- Label: SharpTone
- Producers: Drew Fulk; Will Carlson

We Came as Romans chronology
| Darkbloom (2022) | All Is Beautiful... Because We're Doomed (2025) |

Singles from All Is Beautiful... Because We're Doomed
- 1. "Bad Luck" Released: April 17, 2025; 2. "No Rest for the Dreamer" Released: May 24, 2025; 3. "Culture Wound" Released: July 10, 2025; 4. "Where Did You Go?" Released: July 31, 2025; 5. "One by One" Released: August 23, 2025

All Is Beautiful... Because We're Doomed: Circularity
- Deluxe edition cover

Singles from All Is Beautiful... Because We're Doomed: Circularity
- 1. "Red Smoke" Released: August 27, 2026; 2. "Culture Wound" Released: September 4, 2026; 3. "One by One" Released: September 10, 2026; 4. "B2TM" Released: September 15, 2026; 5. "Born from Nothing" Released: September 23, 2026; 6. "Where Did You Go?" Released: October 15, 2026; 7. "Dead Silent" Released: November 4, 2026

Professional ratings
Review scores
| Source | Rating |
|---|---|
| Kerrang! | 4/5 |
| Rock 'N' Load | 9/10 |

All Is Beautiful... Because We're Doomed is the seventh studio album by American metalcore band We Came as Romans. It was released on August 22, 2025, via SharpTone Records.

== Background and promotion ==
On April 17, 2025, the band released their first single called "Bad Luck" for their upcoming album. On May 24, 2025, the band released "No Rest For the Dreamer" as their second single for their upcoming album.

On July 9, 2025, the band released another single, "Culture Wound", while officially announcing their seventh album called All Is Beautiful... Because We're Doomed which was scheduled for release on August 22, 2025. One more pre-release single, "Where Did You Go?", was released on July 31, 2025.

To promote the album, We Came as Romans toured North America and Europe from July to October 2025, with support from After the Burial, Currents, Johnny Booth and Brand of Sacrifice.

=== Circularity deluxe edition ===
In August 2026, the band announced they would be releasing a deluxe edition of the album, entitled All is Beautiful... Because We're Doomed: Circularity, including 4 new songs and 6 reimagined songs. The first single to be released from the deluxe album was "Red Smoke" featuring Heavensgate, released on August 27. The next single, a Spanish language version of "Culture Wound" featuring Mexican band Ladrones, was released September 4. The third reimagined track to be released was "One by One" featuring Dayseeker, on September 10. The fourth single, "B2TM" featuring Bury Tomorrow, was released September 15. On September 23, the band released the first new track for the deluxe edition, "Born from Nothing", and revealed the tracklist and the release date for the deluxe edition: November 6. On October 15, the band released the sixth single, "Where Did You Go?" featuring Headwreck. On November 4, the band released the seventh single, "Dead Silent" featuring Make Them Suffer.

== Track listing ==
=== Original release ===
All tracks are written by Dave Stephens, Joshua Moore, Lou Cotton, Andy Glass and David Puckett, with additional co-writers listed.

All Is Beautiful... Because We're Doomed track listing
| No. | Title | Writer(s) | Producer(s) | Length |
|---|---|---|---|---|
| 1. | "All Is Beautiful..." | Will Carlson | Carlson | 1:09 |
| 2. | "Bad Luck" | Jordan Fish; Drew Fulk | Fulk | 4:05 |
| 3. | "Lake of Fire" | Steve Sopchak; Carlson | Carlson | 2:56 |
| 4. | "Red Smoke" | Alex Minarik; Carlson | Carlson | 2:46 |
| 5. | "One by One" | Sopchak; Fulk | Fulk; Carlson | 3:18 |
| 6. | "Culture Wound" | Sopchak; Carlson | Carlson | 3:31 |
| 7. | "Where Did You Go?" | Carlson | Carlson | 3:45 |
| 8. | "No Rest for the Dreamer" | Minarik; Carlson | Carlson | 3:08 |
| 9. | "B2TM" | Fulk; Nick Sampson | Fulk | 2:49 |
| 10. | "Circling a Dying Sun" | Fulk; Carlson | Carlson | 2:55 |
| 11. | "Knowing Pain" | Carlson | Carlson | 3:18 |
| 12. | "So Lost (Burning Flowers)" | Minarik; Carlson | Carlson | 3:27 |
| 13. | "Because We're Doomed" | Fulk; Landon Tewers | Fulk | 3:53 |
| Total length: | | | | 41:00 |

==== Notes ====
- Tracks 1 and 13 are stylized in all caps
- All other tracks titles are stylized in lowercase
- "B2TM" stands for "Bow to the Machine"

=== Circularity deluxe edition ===
All Is Beautiful... Because We're Doomed: Circularity track listing
| No. | Title | Length |
|---|---|---|
| 1. | "When Everything Is Still" | 3:26 |
| 2. | "Dead Silent" (featuring Make Them Suffer) | 3:26 |
| 3. | "Born from Nothing" | 3:23 |
| 4. | "Speak to Exist" | 3:26 |
| 5. | "All Is Beautiful..." | 1:09 |
| 6. | "Bad Luck" | 4:05 |
| 7. | "Bad Luck" (featuring Currents and After the Burial) | 4:12 |
| 8. | "Lake of Fire" | 2:56 |
| 9. | "Red Smoke" | 2:46 |
| 10. | "Red Smoke" (featuring Heavensgate) | 3:16 |
| 11. | "One by One" | 3:18 |
| 12. | "One by One" (featuring Dayseeker) | 3:16 |
| 13. | "Culture Wound" | 3:31 |
| 14. | "Culture Wound" (featuring Ladrones) | 3:41 |
| 15. | "Where Did You Go?" | 3:45 |
| 16. | "Where Did You Go?" (featuring Headwreck) | 3:06 |
| 17. | "No Rest for the Dreamer" | 3:08 |
| 18. | "B2TM" | 2:49 |
| 19. | "B2TM" (featuring Bury Tomorrow) | 3:46 |
| 20. | "Circling a Dying Sun" | 2:55 |
| 21. | "Knowing Pain" | 3:18 |
| 22. | "So Lost (Burning Flowers)" | 3:27 |
| 23. | "Because We're Doomed" | 3:53 |

==== Notes ====
- Tracks 1–5 and 23 are stylized in all caps
- All other tracks titles are stylized in lowercase
- Tracks 7, 10, 12, 14, 16, and 19 are stylized with a white circle ○ after the title
- Track 14 is in Spanish
- "B2TM" stands for "Bow to the Machine"

== Personnel ==
- Dave Stephens – lead vocals, keyboards
- Joshua Moore – lead guitar, backing vocals
- Lou Cotton – rhythm guitar
- Andy Glass – bass guitar, backing vocals
- David Puckett – drums, percussion
