= Darkbloom (album) =

Studio album by We Came as Romans
- Released: October 14, 2022
- Recorded: 2020–2021
- Genre: Metalcore; post-hardcore
- Length: 36:42
- Label: SharpTone
- Producer: Drew Fulk

We Came as Romans chronology
Cold Like War (2017)	Darkbloom (2022)	All Is Beautiful... Because We're Doomed (2025)

Darkbloom is the sixth studio album by American metalcore band We Came as Romans. It was released on October 14, 2022, and is their first album in five years. This is the band's first album without clean vocalist/keyboardist Kyle Pavone, after his death from an accidental drug overdose in August 2018. The band chose not to replace Pavone out of respect for his memory; instead, they used synths written by producer Drew Fulk and recorded by Pavone before his death, and unclean vocalist Dave Stephens, who had occasionally performed clean vocals alongside Pavone, took over on clean vocals full-time.

== Background and promotion ==
After some touring in honor of Kyle Pavone, on April 16, 2019, the band announced that it would enter the studio to record new material. The material they recorded in 2019 turned out to be two stand-alone singles "Carry the Weight" and "From the First Note". On July 14, 2021, the band released "Darkbloom", the title track and first single from their upcoming album.

On September 7, We Came As Romans released a new single called "Black Hole" featuring Caleb Shomo of Beartooth. On November 10, the band released a new song titled "Daggers" featuring rapper Zero 9:36. On April 10, 2022, the band released the reimagined version of the previous single "Darkbloom" featuring Canadian deathcore band Brand of Sacrifice, which like the band's two 2019 singles, did not make it into the album. On June 22, the album Darkbloom was announced with a release date of October 14, 2022 and featuring the previous-released singles "Darkbloom", "Black Hole", and "Daggers", along with new single "Plagued" that was written in January 2020 and took over a year to complete recording, and one more pre-release single "Golden", released on September 7, 2022.

We Came as Romans have announced a month-long U.S. tour in support of Darkbloom, starting in Pittsburgh on January 19, 2023, with support from Erra and Brand of Sacrifice.

== Critical reception ==
Kerrang! stated that Darkbloom is "not an easy listen. But then, the context in which it was made meant it never could be. But in the spirit of the band continuing, it's also worth remembering amongst the dark moments how much life and vitality there is in the delivery here. Like William Faulkner, given a choice between grief and nothing, we would choose grief. Here, We Came as Romans have bravely plunged their hands into what that means, and created something that acts as both a carrier for a knot of emotion, and a tribute to their friend." Rock 'N' Load considered the album "a great return for a band that has been through a truly world-shattering event, and the highs of the album are real high points that luckily overshadow a couple of lows completely. Despite the album being pure metalcore in every sense, that doesn't take away from the emotion the band have put into each and every track on the album. I can't wait to see what the future holds for We Came as Romans now."

== Track listing ==
Darkbloom track listing
No.	Title	Writer(s)	Length
1.	"Darkbloom"	Andrew Glass; David Puckett; David Stephens; Joshua Moore; Drew Fulk	3:48
2.	"Plagued"	Glass; Puckett; Stephens; Moore; Nick Sampson; Ryan Leitru	3:29
3.	"Black Hole" (featuring Caleb Shomo)	Glass; Stephens; Puckett; Moore; Fulk; KJ Strock; Zach Jones	3:00
4.	"Daggers" (featuring Zero 9:36)	Glass; Stephens; Puckett; Moore; Fulk; Strock; Matthew Cullen	3:13
5.	"Golden"	Glass; Stephens; Puckett; Moore; Sampson; Keith Wallen	3:39
6.	"One More Day"	Glass; Stephens; Puckett; Moore; Fulk	4:28
7.	"Doublespeak"	Glass; Stephens; Puckett; Moore; Fulk	3:30
8.	"The Anchor"	Glass; Stephens; Puckett; Moore; Sampson; Cody Quistad	3:35
9.	"Holding the Embers"	Glass; Stephens; Puckett; Moore; Fulk	4:13
10.	"Promise You"	Glass; Stephens; Moore; Sampson	3:47
Total length:			36:42

== Personnel ==
=== We Came as Romans ===
- Dave Stephens – lead vocals
- Kyle Pavone – keyboards (posthumous)
- Joshua Moore – lead guitar, backing vocals, co-lead vocals on "Promise You"
- Lou Cotton – rhythm guitar
- Andy Glass – bass guitar, backing vocals
- David Puckett – drums, percussion

=== Guest musicians ===
- Caleb Shomo – guest vocals on "Black Hole"
- Zero 9:36 – guest rapping on "Daggers"

== Charts ==
Chart performance for Darkbloom
Chart (2022)	Peak position
Swiss Albums (Schweizer Hitparade)	32
