= We Came as Romans =

American metalcore band

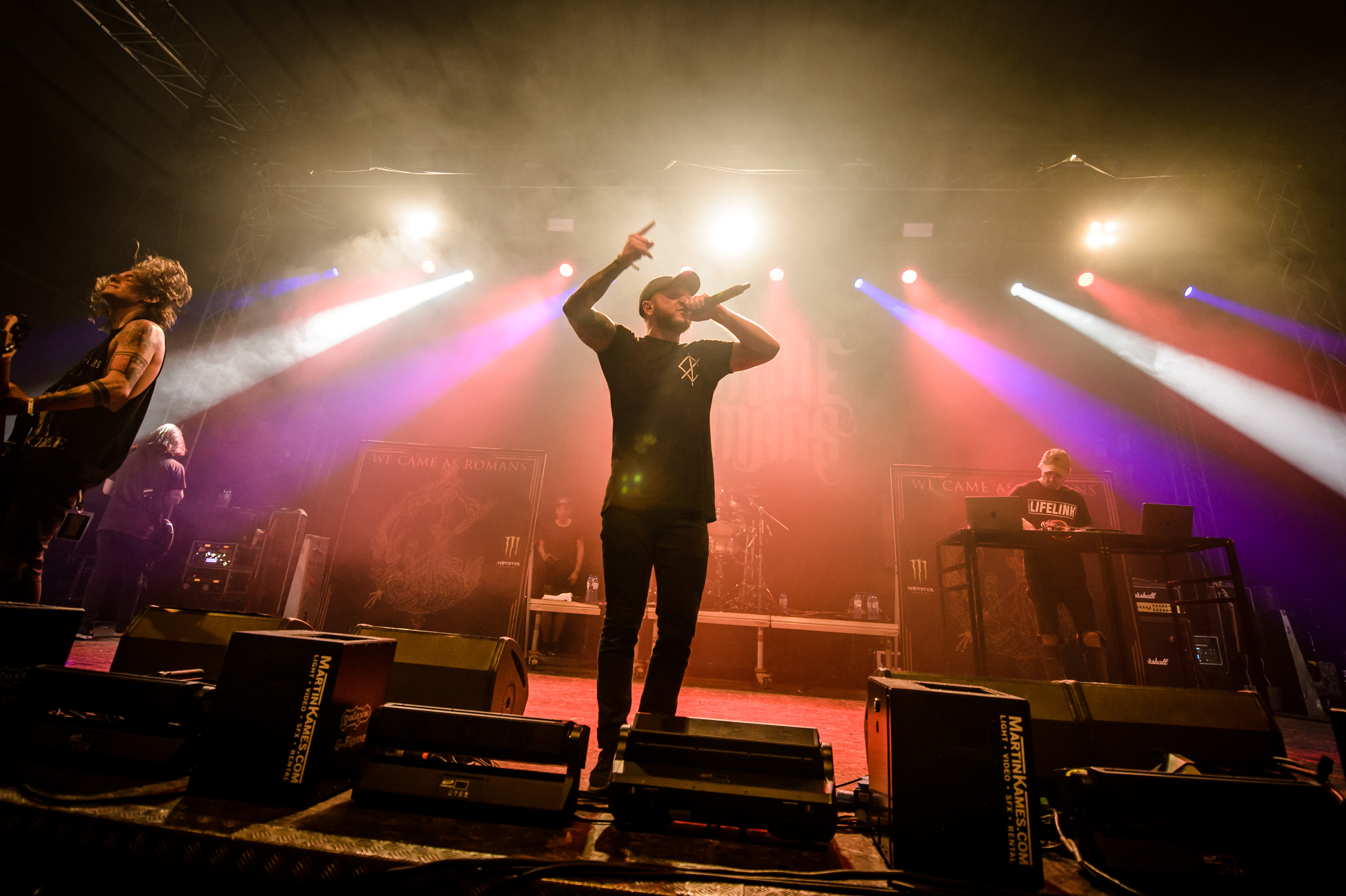
- We Came as Romans performing in 2018

Background information
- Origin: Troy, Michigan, U.S.
- Genres: Metalcore; post-hardcore; alternative metal
- Years active: 2005–present
- Labels: SharpTone; Equal Vision; Spinefarm; Caroline Australia
- Members: Joshua Moore; Dave Stephens; Lou Cotton; Andy Glass; David Puckett
- Past members: Jonny Nabors; Sean E. Daly; Sean N. Zelda; Mark Myatt; Larry Clark; Chris Moore; Eric Choi; Kyle Pavone
- Website: iamdarkbloom.com

We Came as Romans (sometimes abbreviated as WCAR) is an American metalcore band from Troy, Michigan. Formed in 2005, the band has gone through one name change and multiple line-up changes, and signed to SharpTone Records in 2016 after having been on roster of Equal Vision Records since 2009. They have released seven studio albums – To Plant a Seed (2009), Understanding What We've Grown to Be (2011), Tracing Back Roots (2013), We Came as Romans (2015), Cold Like War (2017), Darkbloom (2022), and All Is Beautiful... Because We're Doomed (2025) – and two EPs in 2008 titled Demonstrations and Dreams.

== History ==
=== Formation, line-up changes and To Plant a Seed (2005–2011) ===
In August 2005, high school classmates Sean Zelda, Dave Stephens, Jonny Nabors, Mark Myatt and Joshua Moore formed a band called This Emergency. During the beginning years, Stephens performed the guitar, keyboards and backing vocals. They performed various shows throughout the Detroit metro area. In November 2005, the band parted ways with Nabors, and he was replaced by Sean Daly. In June 2006, Zelda quit to pursue education at the University of Michigan. In the summer of 2006, a close friend of the band and another high school classmate, Larry Clark, officially joined on vocals, and the band changed their name to We Came as Romans. After Clark left in late 2007, the band added Chris Moore as the new singer. According to Stephens, during this time, two songs – "Mouth to Mouth" and the original version of "Colours" – were released with Clark as the vocalist. According to the band's publicist at Equal Vision Records, Moore assumed duties of writing the majority of the lyrics from this point on.

Their first EP, Demonstrations (sometimes referred to as the Motions EP) was sold at concerts and online through their website. Moore left in mid-2008, and the band introduced vocalist Kyle Pavone. During June of the same year, between EPs, We Came as Romans embarked on the V-Neck & Shaved Chest Tour with Close to Home. Afterward, their second EP of the year, Dreams, was released on December 2. It was produced by Joey Sturgis and was met with many favorable reviews. Two days before the release of To Plant a Seed, We Came as Romans concluded support of Oh, Sleeper and The Chariot on their co-headlined Here a Tour, There a Tour, Everywhere a Tour Tour tour, which took place between September and November 2009.

To Plant a Seed, the band's first full-length album, was released on November 3, 2009. Like Dreams, this album was produced alongside Sturgis and features re-recorded versions of "Dreams" and "Intentions" (featuring Tyler Smith) originally from Dreams. We Came as Romans finished 2009 with the "Leave It to the Suits Tour" in November and December alongside I See Stars, Of Mice & Men and Broadway. Their first video single, "To Plant a Seed", was released on May 11, 2010. The band also appeared on the Punk Goes Pop Volume 03. compilation, released on November 1, 2010, with a cover of Justin Timberlake's "My Love".

We Came as Romans' second video single, "To Move On Is to Grow", was released on December 14, 2010, according to iTunes. The album's title track, "To Plant a Seed", appeared on Equal Vision Records Presents: New Sounds 2011, released on December 21, 2010, on iTunes. On January 6, 2011, the band's label, Equal Vision Records, announced that To Plant a Seed would be re-released, including the new single "To Move On Is to Grow", as a CD/DVD deluxe version. The DVD includes 38 minutes of exclusive interviews, behind-the-scenes footage, live performances from their recent United States shows, 2010 tours (Scream It Like You Mean It and Band of Brothers), and a new music video for "To Move on Is to Grow". To Plant a Seed made a big debut on the Billboard charts, reaching No. 6 on Top Heatseekers, No. 25 on Top Independent and No. 175 on the Top 200 charts.

=== Understanding What We've Grown to Be (2011–2013) ===
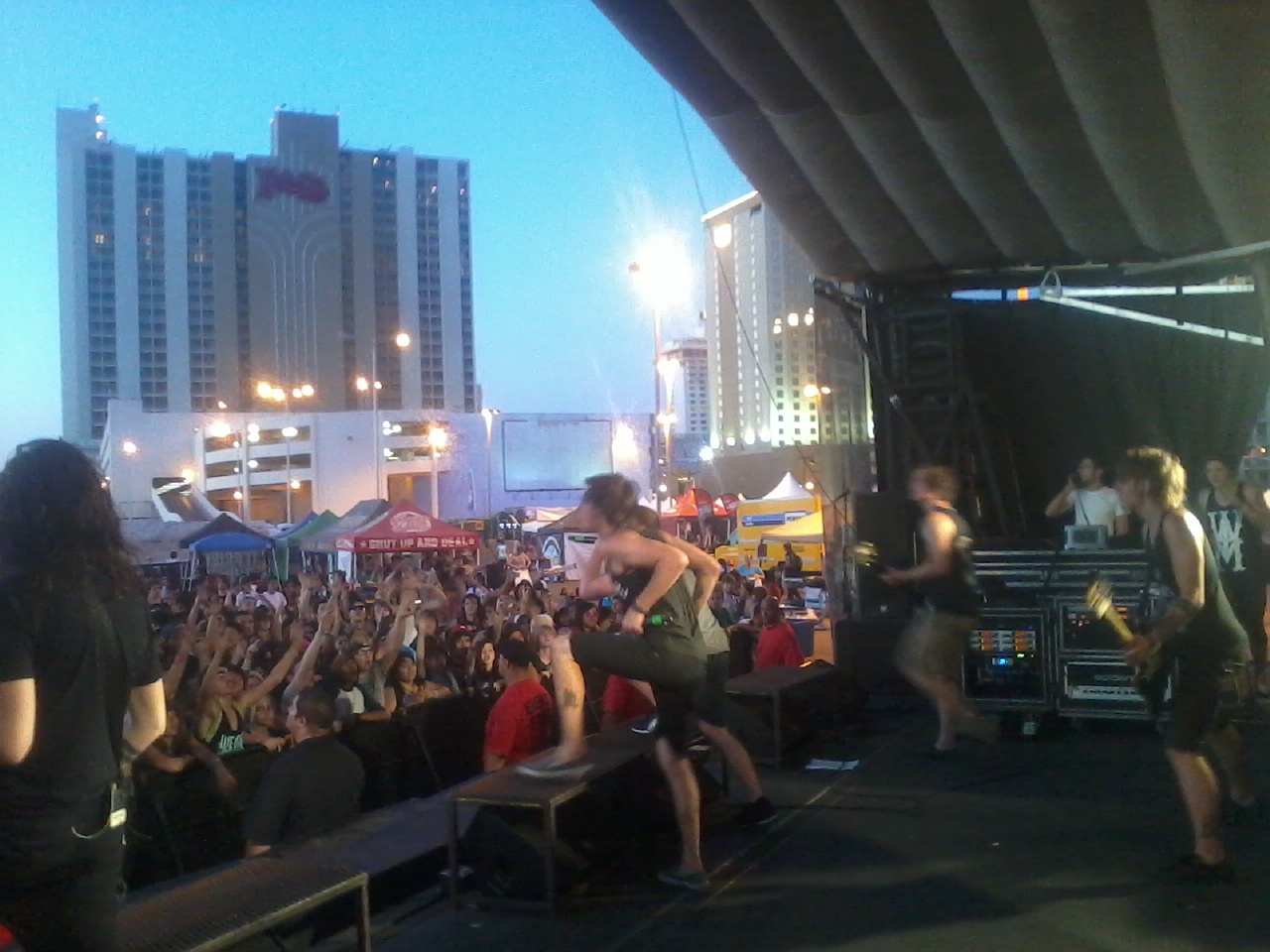
We Came As Romans live in Las Vegas during Warped Tour 2011

Recording for the follow-up of To Plant a Seed was scheduled for two sessions in 2011: February 16 through March 10, and May 16 through June 23. According to We Came as Romans' label, Equal Vision Records, "The band is currently writing for their sophomore full-length album, which they will be recording with Joey Sturgis between tours and is expected to see a fall 2011 release date." In an interview with Brian Walsh, a Monster Energy Pit reporter for Warped Tour 2011, Joshua Moore confirmed that their second album is indeed all planned out and they will be entering the studio before embarking on Warped Tour. During this time, We Came as Romans appeared in the No. 25 (June/July 2011) issue of Substream Music Press magazine, and Dave Stephens appeared in Alternative Press magazine issue No. 227.2 (August 2011). The band was also highlighted in the Vans Warped Tour Official Program.

Understanding What We've Grown to Be was finished and given a September 13, 2011, release date in North America. On June 22, 2011, the first single, "Mis//Understanding", was released via Equal Vision Records through YouTube, followed by the album's title track, "Understanding What We've Grown to Be", the next day. Both of these songs were bundled into a pre-order for sale on iTunes, which was released on July 5, 2011. On July 14, the cover art for the album was released via puzzle on the band's homepage. A deluxe version of the record was released by iTunes, which contained seven live tracks from To Plant a Seed in Sydney, Australia.

According to the band, "Musically and lyrically, Understanding What We've Grown to Be holds a much darker tone than their previous release, To Plant a Seed. While still maintaining the band's overall theme of positivity and brotherhood, the new material takes on a more straightforward approach to life's struggles and the challenges of growing up." On August 24, Equal Vision Records released the third single, "What I Wished I Never Had", also through YouTube. On August 28, the album was leaked unofficially by an unknown source.

Three days after its North American release, on September 16, Understanding What We've Grown to Be was officially released by Nuclear Blast throughout Europe. According to an Outerloop Management source, as of September 21, 2011, Understanding What We've Grown to Be reached No. 20 on Billboard Top 200, No. 7 on Independent Current Albums, No. 5 on Top Hard Music Albums, No. 10 on Top Current Rock Albums and No. 16 on Overall Digital Albums. According to the same source, as of September 28, 2011, Understanding What We've Grown to Be debuted on the Billboard Top 200 at No. 103. On October 16, We Came as Romans came in at No. 43 on Independent Albums and No. 22 on Hard Rock Albums. "Mis//Understanding" was officially released, exclusively by ArtistDirect.com, as the album's first music video on November 11 and later via iTunes on November 22. It was the first of a three-part series of music videos for songs off the album – the second video, for "Just Keep Breathing", was released on December 16, via Livestream.com, and later on iTunes on July 17, 2012, and the third video, for "Understanding What We've Grown to Be", was released on February 2, 2012, via Vevo, and later on iTunes on January 31, 2012.

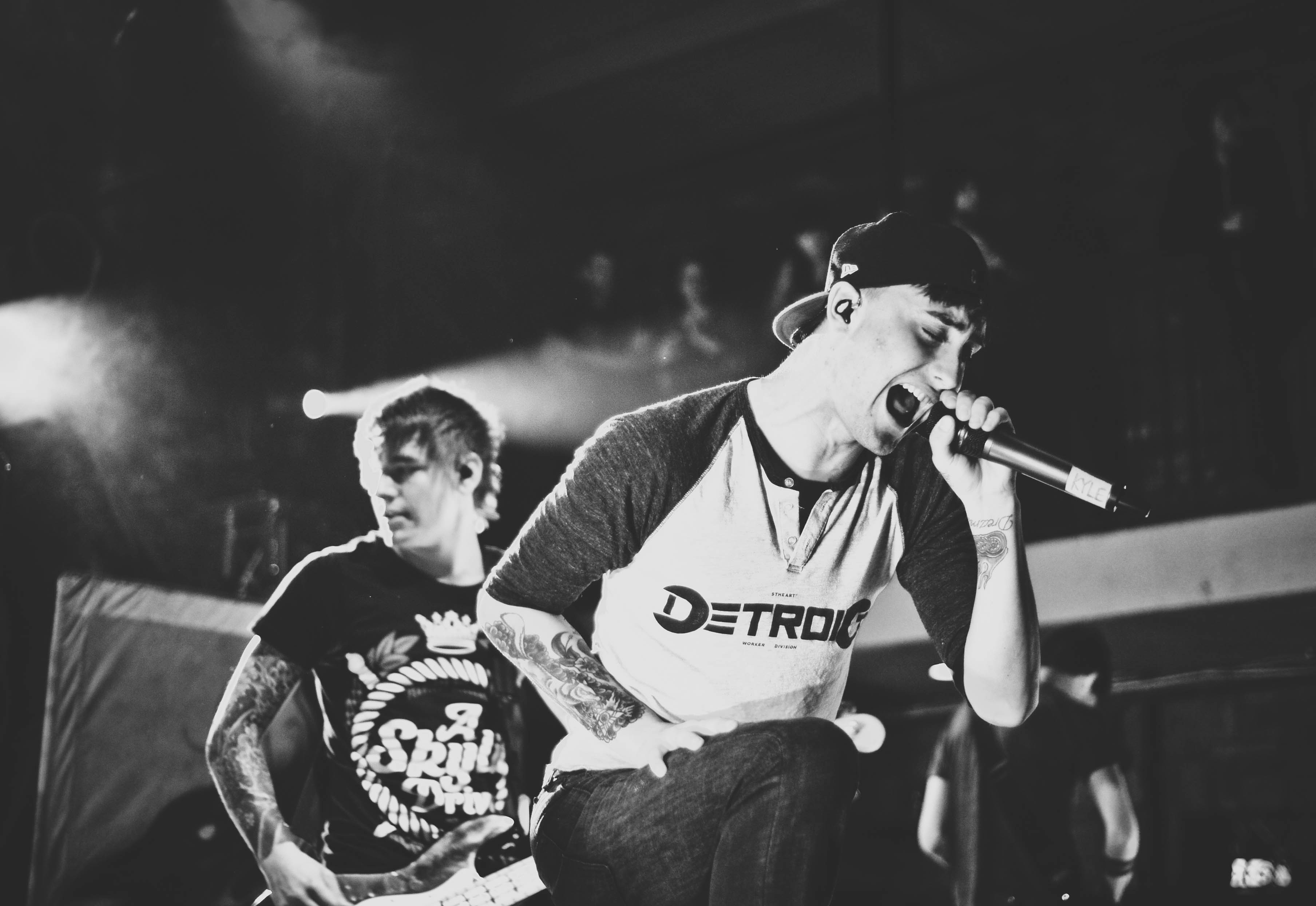
We Came as Romans live In 2012.

According to the band's Facebook post on February 2, 2012, "The three videos we shot portray a person lost, confused and struggling to find purpose in life. He sees himself at his darkest in the first video, trying endlessly to find his way out. After going through a traumatic experience, he finds his way out and his eyes begin to open to a new journey of finding out what really makes him feel alive. Through this journey the man traces back to his childhood house, where it all began. Overwhelming feelings wash over him as he remembers the feeling he once had long ago. Now, with a sense of purpose, he embarks back into the world to take the path he should have taken long ago." The videos were filmed in Brooklyn, New York, in September with director Travis Kopach (AFI, 3OH!3, Panic! at the Disco).

To begin 2012, We Came as Romans co-headlined a European tour – sponsored by Macbeth Footwear and Keep a Breast – in January and February with Alesana and special guest support from Iwrestledabearonce and Glamour of the Kill; they also played the Scream Out Fest, which was held February 17–19, in Tokyo, Japan. During this time, We Came as Romans appeared on the cover of issue No. 285.2 (April 2012) of Alternative Press magazine. On March 5, the band announced a free show to 500 local fans on March 7 at The Crowfoot in Pontiac, Michigan. They then headlined The Fire and Ice Tour – sponsored by Keep a Breast and MerchNow – in March and April with support from Emmure, Blessthefall, Woe, Is Me and The Color Morale, which included headlining the South By So What? festival on March 17 at QuikTrip Park in Grand Prairie, Texas; the Houston We Have A Problem Festival on March 18 at the Verizon Wireless Theatre in Houston, Texas; and Day 1 of the Jamboree Music Festival on April 14 at Headliners in Toledo, Ohio. We Came as Romans also participated in the Pulp Summer Slam with Darkest Hour, Periphery, August Burns Red, Blessthefall and Arch Enemy on April 28 at Amoranto Stadium in Quezon City, Philippines, as well as Day 1 and Day 2's surprise of the annual Bamboozle Festival on May 18 and 19 at Asbury Park, New Jersey.

We Came as Romans was scheduled to support Underoath on their South American tour in May 2012 with additional support from Protest The Hero and Close Your Eyes, but it was canceled. They headlined a free show at Santos Party House in New York City on May 22 with support from Like Moths to Flames and Texas in July, which was broadcast in real time on LiveStream.com. They also headlined a show on June 21 at Peabody's in Cleveland, Ohio, and then played Rockapalooza on June 23 at the Jackson County Fairgrounds in Jackson, Michigan, alongside Woe, Is Me, Puddle of Mudd, Saliva and Red Jumpsuit Apparatus. The band also played two dates supporting the mall-skate-demo-enthused Zumiez Couch Tour on June 24 in Chicago and June 26 at the Mall of America in Minneapolis, Minnesota, with Set Your Goals. They also headlined Summerfest Rock Stage at Summerfest Grounds in Milwaukee, Wisconsin, on June 27.

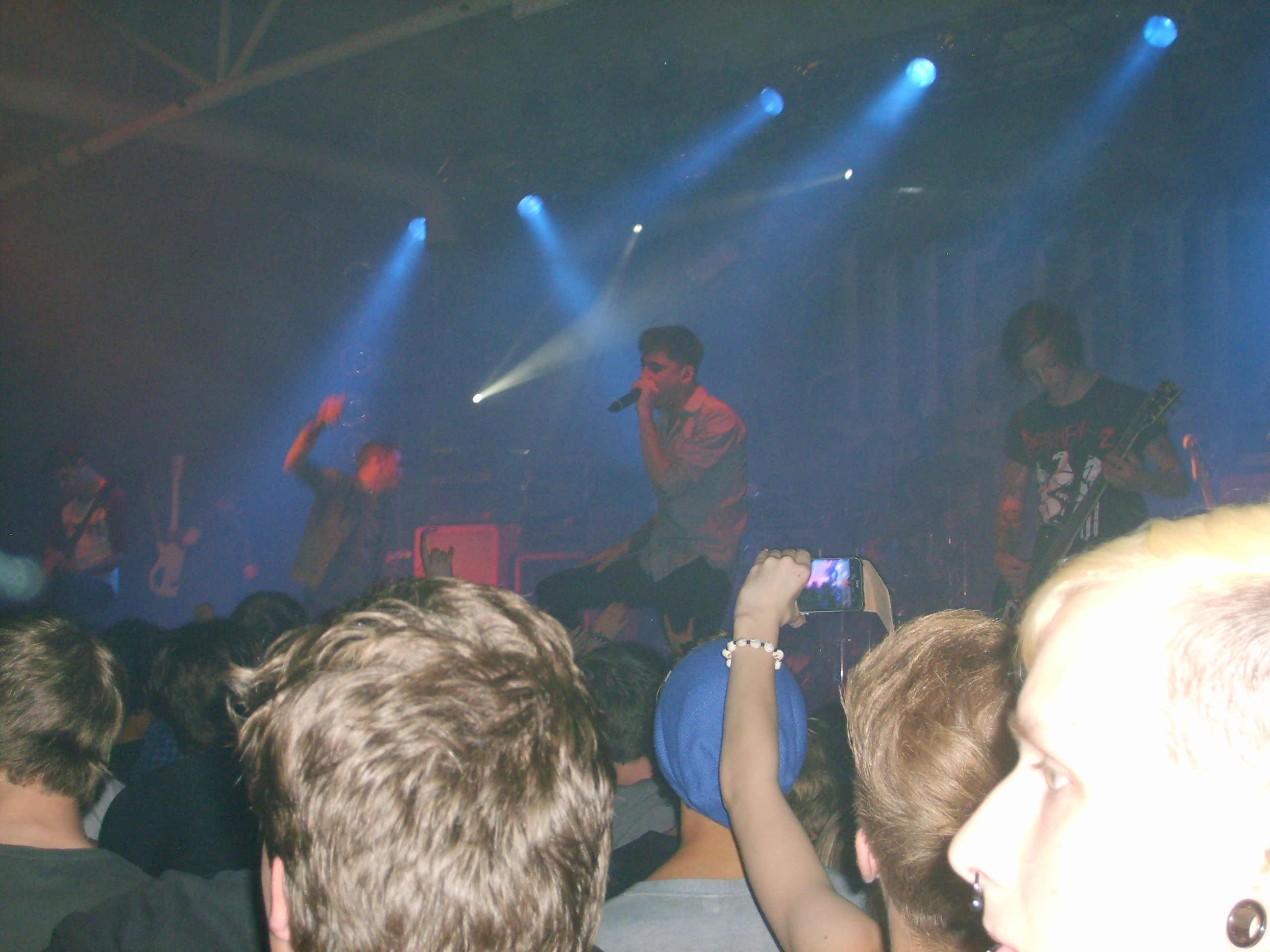
We Came As Romans live in Colonge during the Impericon Never Say Die! Tour 2012

On April 18, 2012, We Came as Romans was announced as part of the Scream It Like You Mean It 2012 tour that took place between July and August alongside headliner Attack Attack! and with support from The Acacia Strain, Oceano, Like Moths to Flames, Close to Home, Impending Doom, Woe, Is Me, Abandon All Ships, Secrets, Volumes, For All Those Sleeping, The Chariot, Glass Cloud, At The Skylines, Texas in July, In Fear and Faith and Hands Like Houses. They then headlined a short Canadian trek from September 11–16 with support from Abandon All Ships, Skip The Foreplay and Ice Nine Kills. We Came as Romans also supported Falling in Reverse at Fright FestEVIL at Six Flags Great Adventure in Jackson, New Jersey, on September 29 with Norma Jean, Texas in July, Born of Osiris, I, the Breather, My Ticket Home, Palisades, Visions, Horizons, I Am King, First of the Fallen and Dream for Tomorrow. On June 6, We Came as Romans were announced as the headliner for the Impericon Never Say Die! Tour from October 12–November 3, as well as a European trek with support from Blessthefall, Stick to Your Guns, For the Fallen Dreams, Obey The Brave, At the Skylines, The Browning and At Dawn We Rage. We Came as Romans extended their stay in Europe and played Russia on November 4 and 5, and closed out the year as a special guest on the Latin American Tour 2012 in early December with headliner August Burns Red.

On September 9, 2012, the band announced that they might release some "new music" by the end of the year. On September 13, We Came as Romans announced that their cover of "Glad You Came" by The Wanted would be included on the Punk Goes Pop Volume 5 compilation, which was released on November 6 and received its own music video that was released on November 13 via FuseTV. Guitarist Joshua Moore told FuseTV about the video: "We've always done really serious music videos, normally with storylines and a bunch of production, but for a while now we really just wanted to do a fun video. Just us hanging out and being ourselves, just being the normal guys that sometimes people seem to forget musicians are.

So we had a ton of fun filming ['Glad You Came'] with our friend Justyn [Moro, the director], and we hope you enjoy viewing it as much as we enjoyed making it!" On December 4, iTunes released a pre-order for the Take Action, Volume 11 compilation, which includes a new We Came as Romans track titled "Fair-Weather", which was released on CD on January 8 and digitally via iTunes on January 9. On December 12, Equal Vision announced that another new song titled "Let These Words Last Forever" would be released on December 18, and a teaser of the track was posted on the label's YouTube page. This single was released via iTunes as scheduled and is featured on the deluxe re-release of Understanding What We've Grown to Be, which was released on January 8 with two additional songs: "Hope" and "The King of Silence".

All three additional tracks were produced and mixed by John Feldmann. "Hope" was released exclusively via MTV Buzzworthy on January 4 for live-streaming. On January 26, the band announced that a music video for "Hope" would premiere on January 31; it was filmed in New Hampshire on December 20 and 21, and directed by Dan Kennedy and Rasa Acharya. The song was also featured as part of two compilations – Equal Vision Records' New Sounds 2013, Vol. 2 - EP compilation via iTunes on April 9 and the 2013 Warped Tour Compilation, which was released on June 4 – and on March 13, it was announced as a feature on ESPN's college lacrosse programming.

=== Tracing Back Roots (2013–2014) ===
During an on-air interview with Jay Hudson of 89X Radio, guitarist Joshua Moore stated that they would begin recording their new album with producer John Feldmann in March 2013. The band entered the studio on March 13 and would record the new record for the next seven weeks. Vocalist Dave Stephens announced via Twitter that he would be singing more on this record than the band's previous releases, and also announced on April 23 that recording had wrapped up.

On May 20, We Came as Romans, Equal Vision Records and Outerloop Management revealed, via online studio updates and social media posts, the album cover artwork, track listing and that the band's third full-length album, titled Tracing Back Roots, was scheduled for a July 23, 2013, release. The title track, "Tracing Back Roots", was the first single following "Hope" and was released on June 11 via iTunes. An official lyric video was released by Equal Vision Records the same day and was directed by DJay Brawner of Anthem Films. On June 28, the band announced the second single's title, "Fade Away", and it was released on July 3 via YouTube and July 9 via iTunes. "Tracing Back Roots" was featured on the Equal Vision Records 2013 Summer Sampler, which was released via iTunes on July 2. On July 10, Hot Topic officially released the track "Ghosts" from the band's upcoming album on their Facebook site with a link to Equal Vision Records' SoundCloud, and on July 12, Alternative Press premiered "Never Let Me Go" through their official website.

The band was filmed in New York for an upcoming music video on their Vans Warped Tour 2013 off-date, July 15, for the song "Fade Away"; it premiered on September 3 via Equal Vision Records' YouTube channel. On July 16, the band released "I Survive" featuring Aaron Gillespie of Underoath via MTV Buzzworthy and Front magazine in the UK. On July 18, the band streamed Tracing Back Roots in its entirety via Pandora Premieres (US) and Rock Sound (UK). Tracing Back Roots received a 4/5 review from The Detroit Sun newspaper on July 19, 2013, which also marked their milestone of eight years as a band. Tracing Back Roots was officially released via iTunes and other outlets on July 23, 2013, as scheduled. A Target-exclusive edition featured two extra tracks: "One Face" and "Recklessness". The album reached No. 2 in daily sales via iTunes on its release date. MerchNow's release included a DVD titled "Endless Roads" that was filmed by DJay Brawner. On August 10, the album debuted at No. 8 on the Billboard Top 200, No. 1 on the Top Hard Rock Albums and Independent Albums charts, and No. 2 on the Top Rock Albums chart.

A special 30-minute acoustic show called "Tracing Back Roots Release Celebration" was scheduled for September 29 at 6:00 p.m. CDT via StageIt.com, but it was postponed until October 14 due to technical difficulties. On September 26, the band was filmed for an upcoming music video in Los Angeles with Dan Dobi of Please Subscribe Film; they announced on December 16 that the video was for "Never Let Me Go" and that it would be released on December 18 via Fuse.com. Kerrang! released an exclusive video of "Tracing Back Roots", which was filmed during Vans Warped Tour 2013, via their website on November 14. This was filmed by the band's crew, but most notably by Joel Pilotte, a freelance photographer from Southern Ontario, Canada.

On November 26, 2013, Ibanez announced that guitarist Joshua Moore had become a sponsored artist; he currently uses Ibanez FR and ARZ guitar models. In response to this announcement, Moore stated: "I'm stoked to finally announce that I'm an exclusive Ibanez artist! I was elated to hear that the interest I had in playing their guitars was met with the same interest to work with me. For the first time, since [We Came as Romans] began over eight years ago, I'm playing guitars that I truly want to play and believe that the company who made them truly will support me." The band was featured on ZioGiorgio.com, recognizing that "the PreSonus StudioLive 24.4.2 digital console has long been an important part of [the band's] arsenal. [This equipment allows] the band to control their own monitor [and in-ear mixes]."

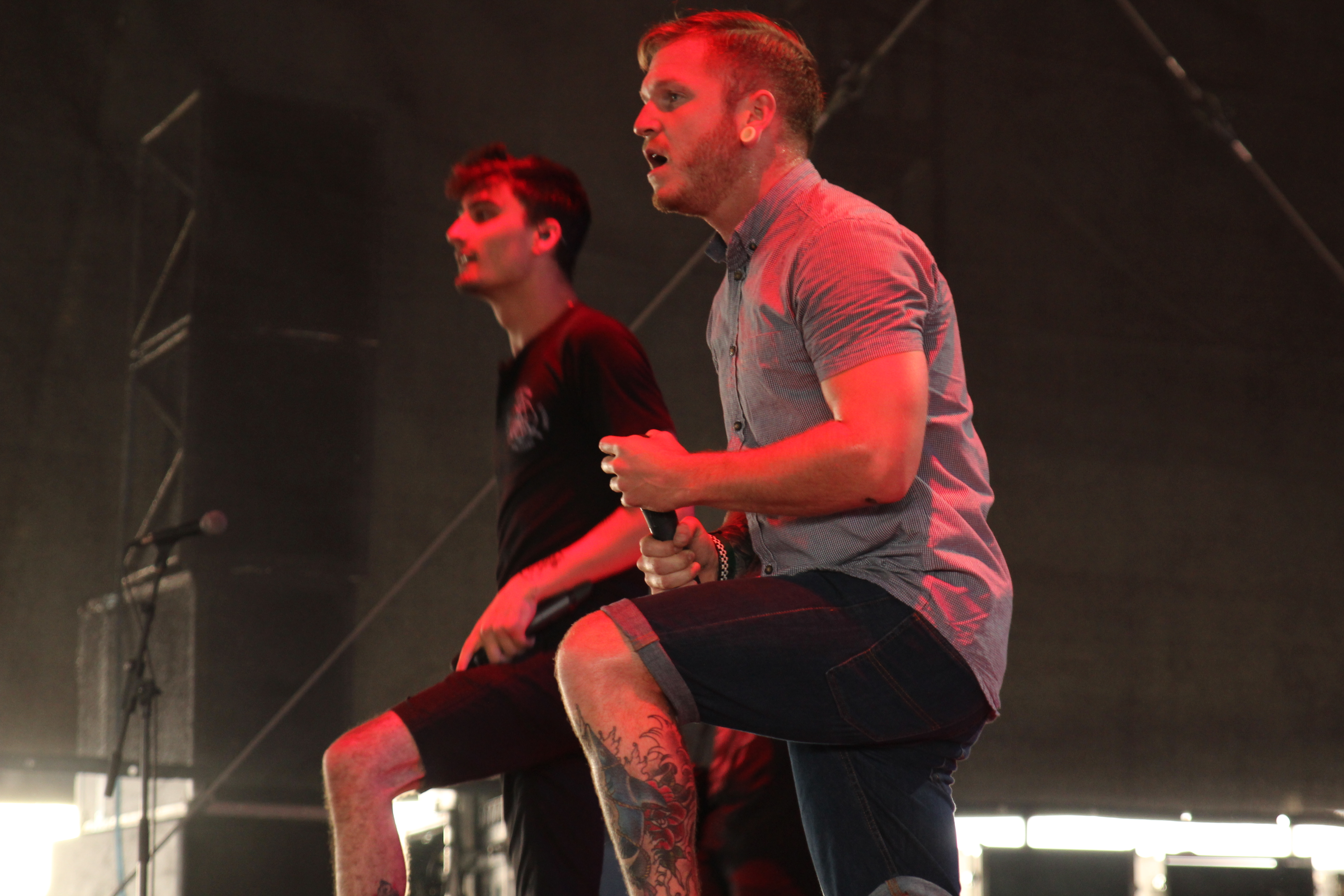
Vocalists Kyle Pavone (left) and Dave Stephens (right) in 2014.

On December 27, 2013, We Came as Romans were presented Billboard plaques via Equal Vision Records for Tracing Back Roots' August 10, 2013, placement on Billboard's charts: No. 1 on Independent Albums, No. 1 on Internet Albums, No. 1 on Hard Rock Albums, No. 2 on Top Rock Albums, and No. 8 on Top 200 Albums. On November 28, Equal Vision Records released acoustic versions of "A Moment" and "Hope" via their YouTube channel. On January 27, 2014, the band released a music video for "Ghosts", which was directed by Carlo Oppermann of ambitious.films via Nuclear Blast on Kerrang.com.

=== Self-titled fourth album and Eric Choi's departure (2015–2016) ===
On May 26, 2015, We Came as Romans announced that their self-titled fourth studio album would be released on July 24. They also released a single from the album, titled "The World I Used to Know", along with a music video for "Regenerate". The album was commercially successful, but received a mixed reception from fans due to marking a change in the band's sound. The band headlined 2015's Warped Tour on the main stage throughout the summer.

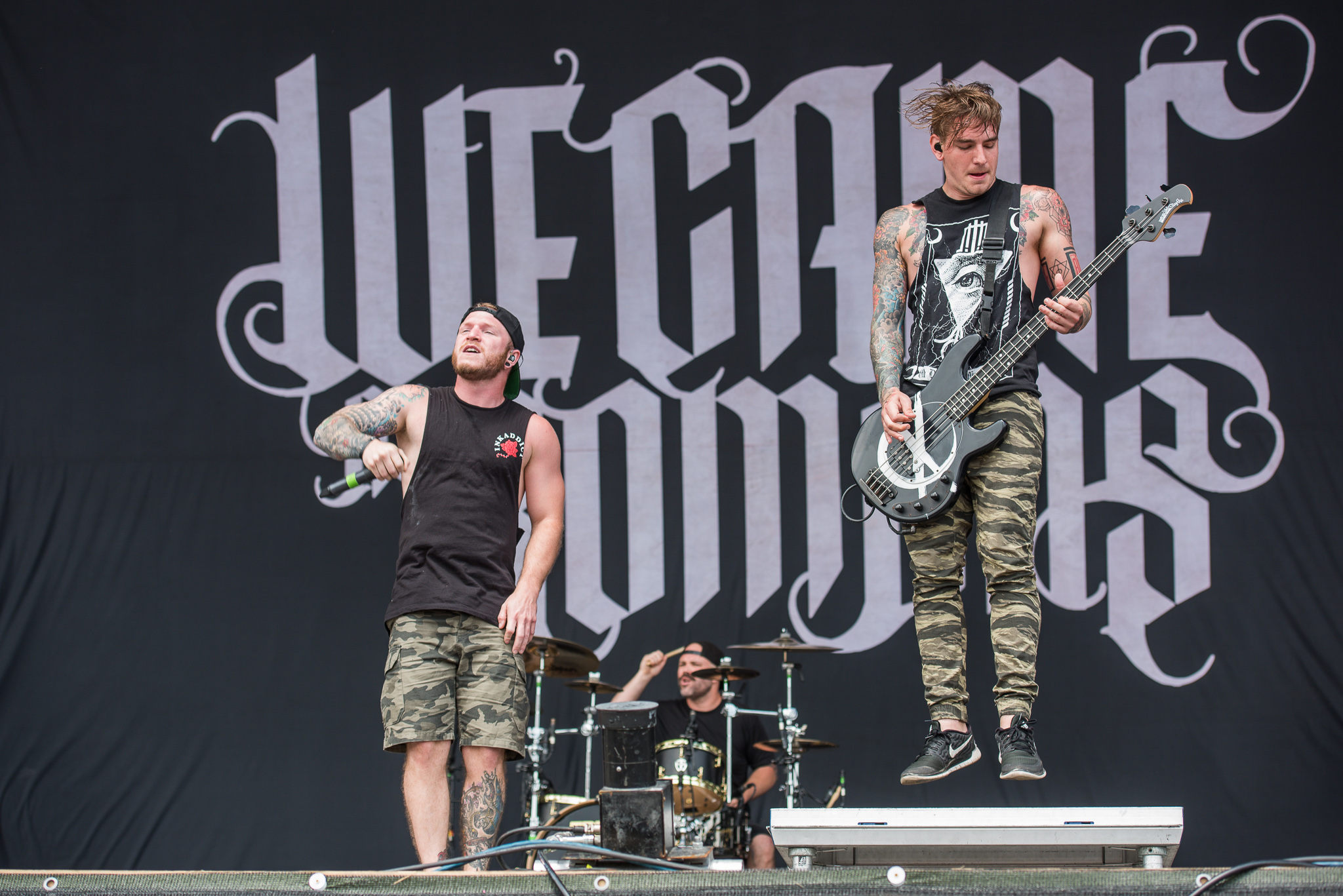
We Came As Romans live at Rock im Park 2016

On October 12, 2015, members of We Came as Romans announced that three of them had formed a new project called Crucible with former Taproot member Nick Freddell and former Assassins guitarist Todd Jansen. Dave Stephens performed as the frontman, Andy Glass performed as the bassist, Lou Cotton and Todd Jansen performed as the guitarists, and Nick Freddell performed as the drummer. On October 20, they released the first song from their upcoming debut EP, Death Rate, featuring Bleeding Through vocalist Brandan Schieppati. On November 7, The Trials EP was released, and most of the songs featured a guest vocalist, with the exception of "The Trials" and "Fear Mongers": "The Misconceived" featured former Vanna vocalist Davey Muise, "Bastard" featured Kyle Pavone and "Slave to the Dime" featured Landon Tewers of The Plot in You (and formerly of Before Their Eyes). They toured following the EP's release and have not played a live show since March 2017.

On September 29, 2016, We Came as Romans presented a new single called "Wasted Age".

The band played on Parkway Drive's Unbreakable Tour in North America in September and October with Counterparts, as well. On October 4, drummer Eric Choi announced he would be leaving the band to pursue other goals in life after being in the band for about 10 years.

=== Cold Like War and Kyle Pavone's death (2017–2018) ===
On June 4, 2017, For Today announced via their Facebook page that their drummer, David Puckett (also formerly of The Crimson Armada), would be taking on the drum duties for We Came as Romans "throughout this year." He is credited for drums at the end of the music video for the "Cold Like War" single released on September 11, 2017.

The album Cold Like War was released on October 20, 2017. It was the band's first album without Choi and their first with SharpTone Records after having been with Equal Vision Records since 2009.

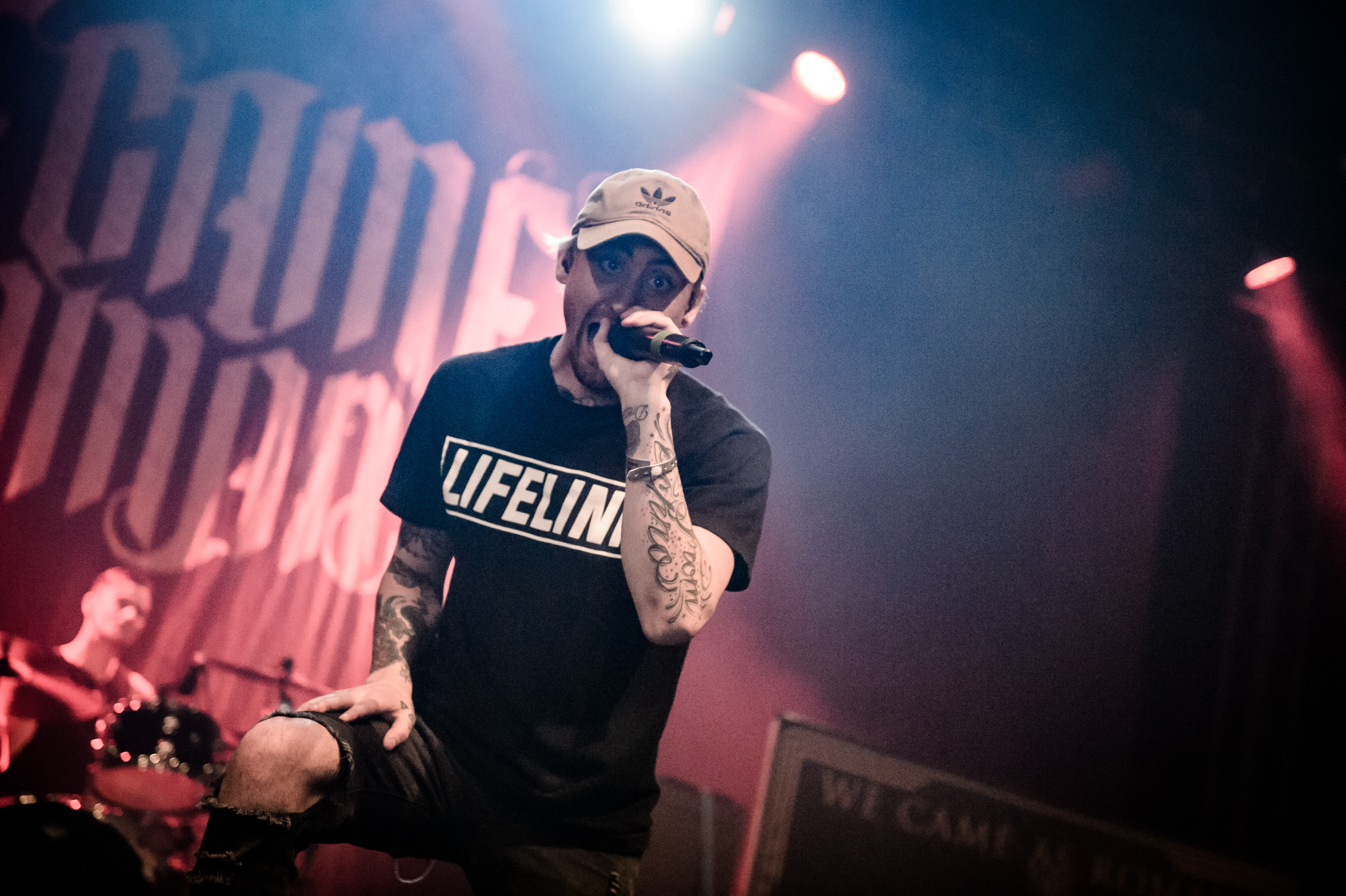
Clean vocalist/keyboardist Kyle Pavone died on August 25, 2018 at the age of 28 from an accidental drug overdose.

On August 25, 2018, the band stated on their social media accounts that Pavone had died at the age of 28. A few days later, on August 31, the band revealed his cause of death as an accidental drug overdose and announced that a foundation had been started in his honor.

On September 11, 2018, Dave Stephens confirmed that the band would not replace Kyle Pavone. Stephens also confirmed that the band would go on tour with Bullet for My Valentine and Bad Omens as scheduled, honoring Kyle and talking about his foundation.

=== Darkbloom (2019–2024) ===
In the spring of 2019, the band went on co-headline tour with Crown the Empire, Erra, and SHVPES. On April 16, the band announced that it would enter the studio to record new material. On September 23, the band announced that two standalone singles would be released by the end of the week; on September 29, the band released "Carry the Weight" and "From the First Note", the former of the two receiving a second release on May 29, this time as another version featuring Fit for a King. On July 14, the band released the single "Darkbloom" from their upcoming album.

On September 7, 2021, We Came as Romans released a new single called "Black Hole" featuring Caleb Shomo of Beartooth.

On November 10, 2021, the band released a new song titled "Daggers" featuring rapper Zero 9:36. On April 10, 2022, the band released the reimagined version of the previous single "Darkbloom" featuring Canadian deathcore band Brand of Sacrifice. On June 22, the band announced their first record since 2017, Darkbloom, and it was released on October 14 and features the singles "Darkbloom", "Plagued", "Black Hole" featuring Caleb Shomo, "Daggers" featuring Zero 9:36 and "Golden".

=== All Is Beautiful... Because We're Doomed (2025–present) ===
On April 17, 2025, the band released their first single called "Bad Luck" for their upcoming album.

On May 24, 2025, the band released "No Rest For the Dreamer" as their second single for their upcoming album.

On July 9, 2025, the band released another single, "Culture Wound", while officially announcing their seventh album called All Is Beautiful... Because We're Doomed which released on August 22, 2025. In August 2025, the band were confirmed to be performing at the Hellfest music festival being held in Clisson in June 2026.

== Musical style ==
"Broken Statues"
"Broken Statues", the second track on We Came as Roman's debut album, To Plant a Seed, demonstrates the band's use of violin, group vocal harmonies, and keyboard ballads.

We Came as Romans' musical style has been primarily described as post-hardcore, metalcore, and screamo. Their songs regularly include melodic passages with orchestral instrumentation, such as violin and keyboard ballads.

The band's lyrics feature an "overall theme of positivity" discussing topics such as purpose, hope, brotherhood, and morality. Their self-titled 2015 album marked a noticeable shift in style to a more radio-friendly sound, showing the band "grow out of their heavier metalcore roots and move towards a more alternative metal, melodic direction", embracing a "more mature" sound.

== Band members ==
We Came as Romans live at Rock im Park 2016

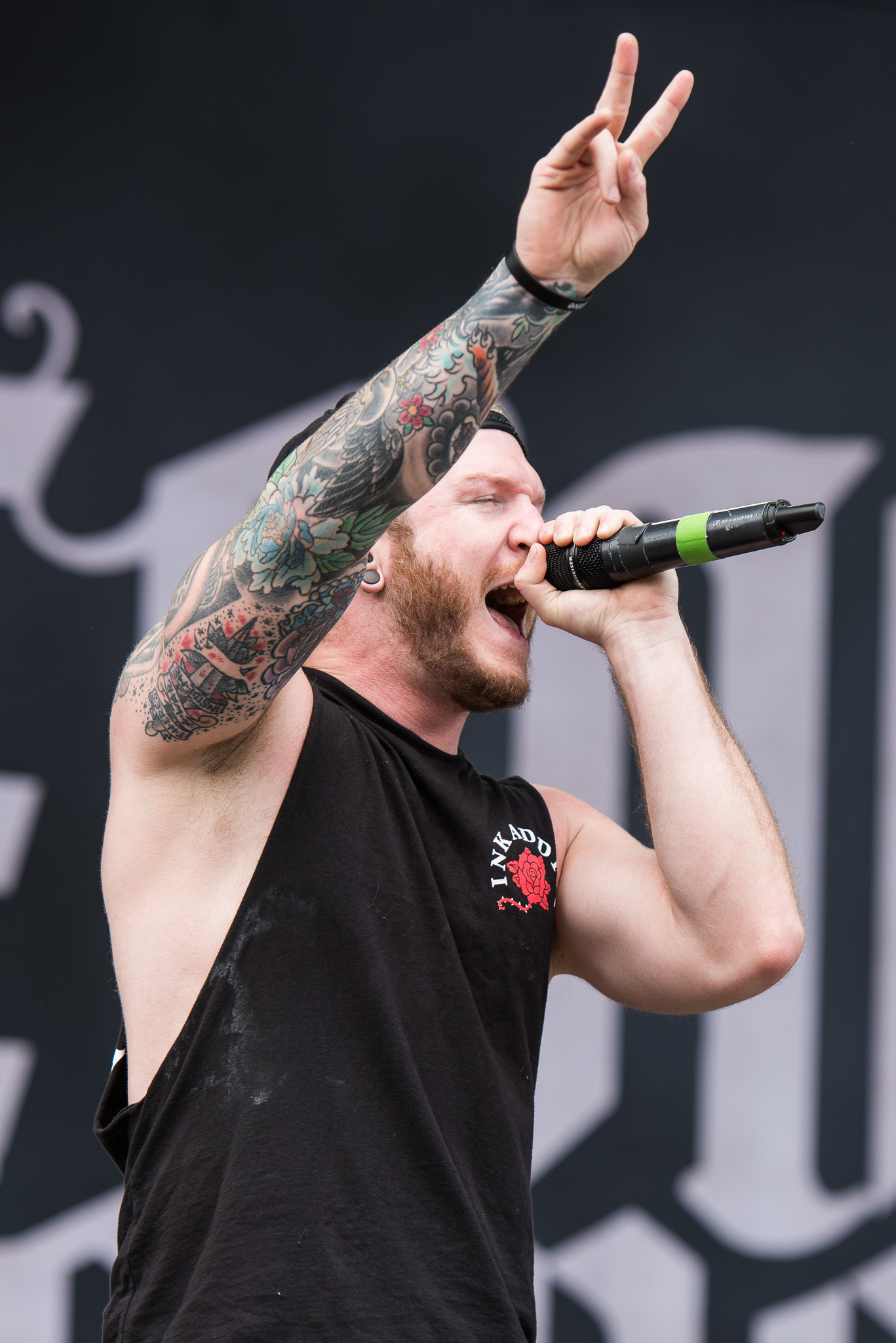
Dave Stephens

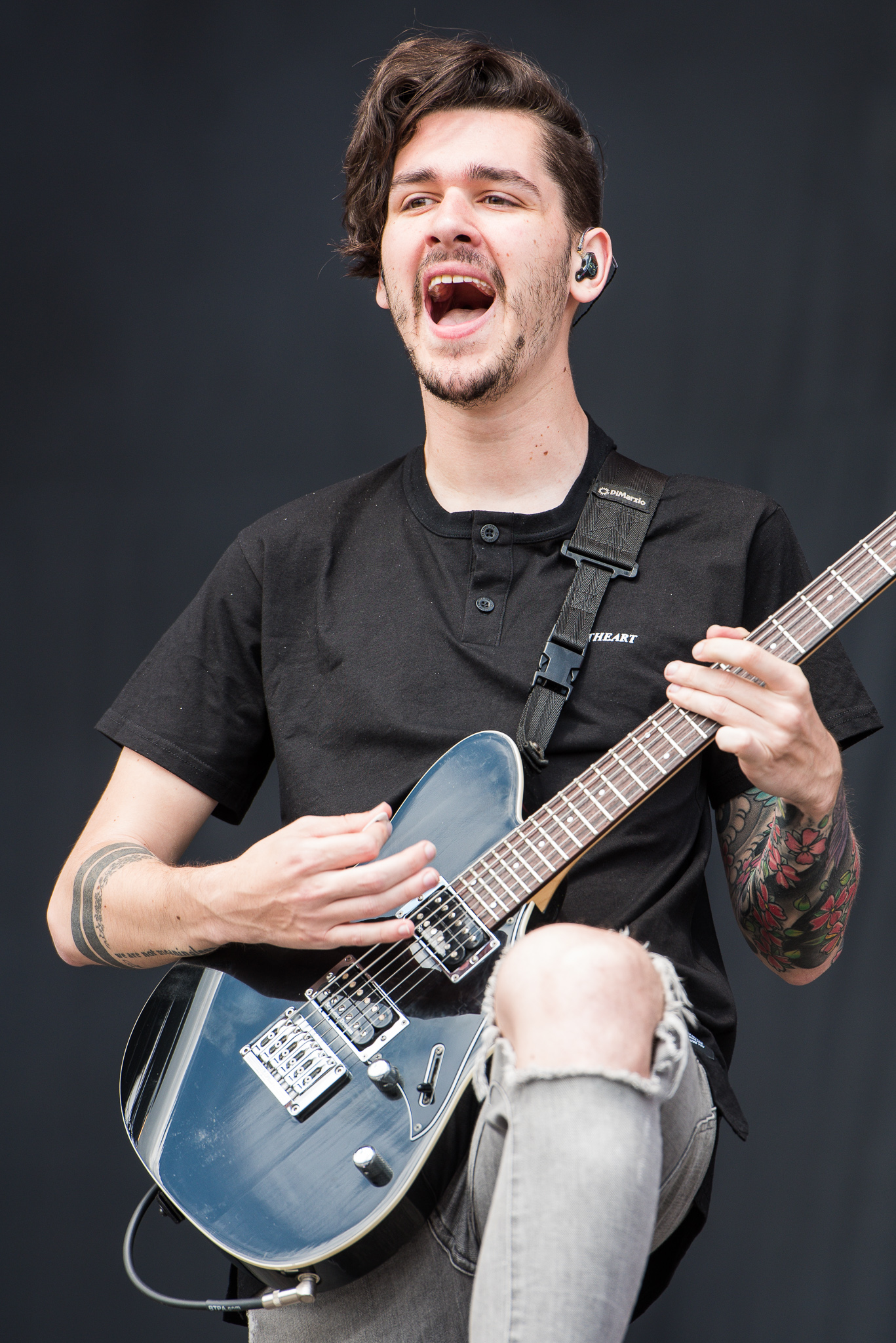
Joshua Moore

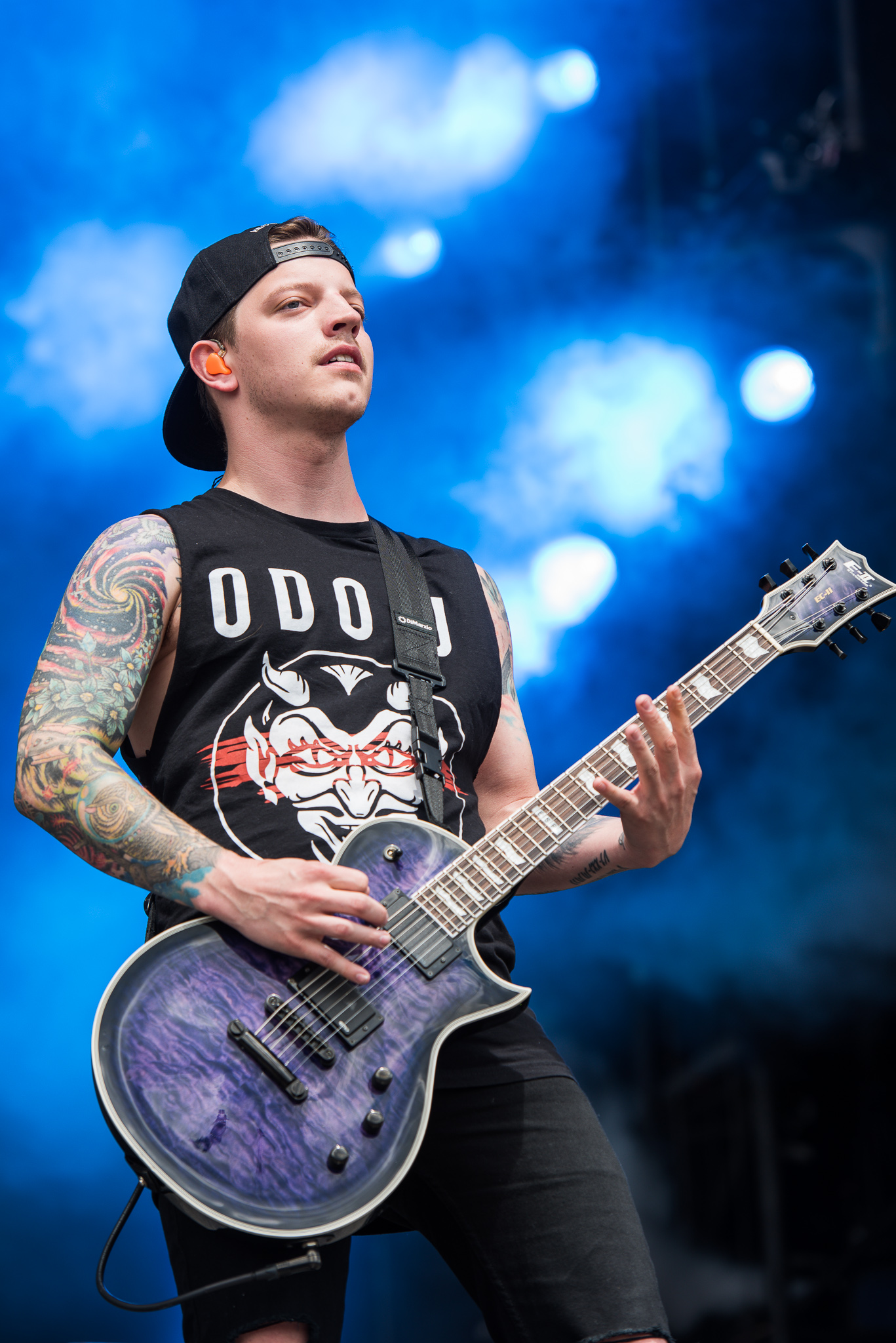
Lou Cotton

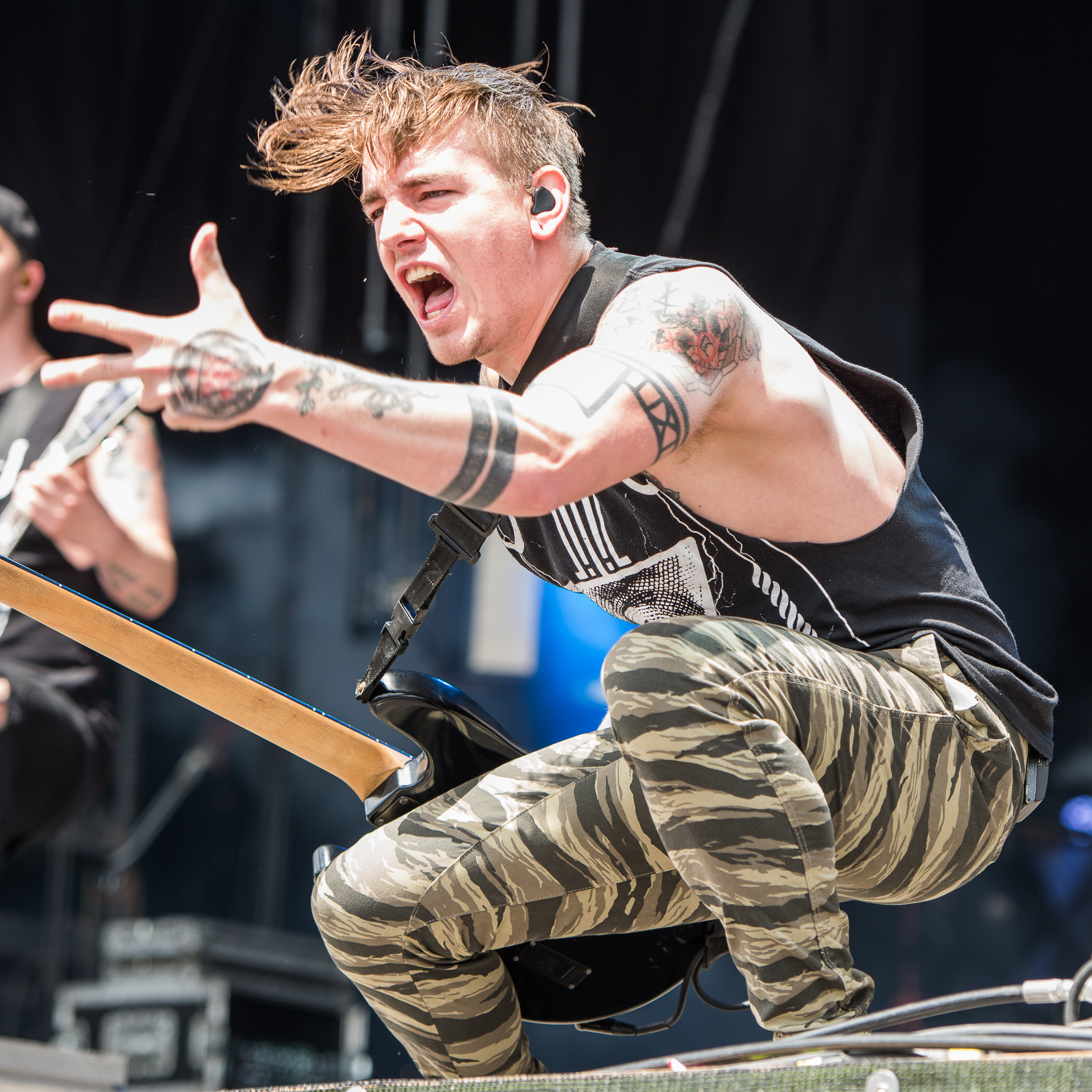
Andy Glass

Current

- Joshua Moore – lead guitar, backing vocals (2005–present)
- Dave Stephens – lead vocals (2006–present); keyboards, synthesizers (2005–2008, 2018–present); rhythm guitar, backing vocals (2005–2006)
- Lou Cotton – rhythm guitar (2006–present)
- Andy Glass – bass, backing vocals (2006–present)
- David Puckett – drums, percussion (2017–present)

Former

- Jonny Nabors – bass, backing vocals (2005–2006)
- Sean E. Daly – bass, backing vocals (2006)
- Sean N. Zelda – drums, percussion, backing vocals (2005–2006)
- Mark Myatt – lead vocals (2005–2006)
- Larry Clark – unclean vocals (2006–2007)
- Chris Moore – unclean vocals, keyboards, synthesizers (2007–2008)
- Eric Choi – drums, percussion (2006–2016)
- Kyle Pavone – clean vocals, keyboards, synthesizers, MIDI controller (2008–2018; died 2018)

Touring

- Joseph Arrington – drums, percussion (2016–2017)

Timeline

== Discography ==
=== Studio albums ===
List of studio albums, with selected chart positions
Title	Album details	Peak chart positions			
Title	Album details	US	US Indie	AUS	GER
To Plant a Seed	Released: November 3, 2009; Label: Equal Vision	175	25	—	—
Understanding What We've Grown to Be	Released: September 13, 2011; Label: Equal Vision	21	7	72	—
Tracing Back Roots	Released: July 23, 2013; Label: Equal Vision	8	1	83	85
We Came as Romans	Released: July 24, 2015; Label: Equal Vision	11	2	29	82
Cold Like War	Released: October 20, 2017; Label: SharpTone	61	—	—	—
Darkbloom	Released: October 14, 2022; Label: SharpTone	—	—	—	—
All Is Beautiful... Because We're Doomed	Released: August 22, 2025; Label: SharpTone	—	—	—	—
"—" denotes a release that did not chart or was not issued in that region.

=== Extended plays ===
- Dreams (self-released, December 2008)
- Demonstrations (self-released, 2008)

=== Singles ===
==== 2000s-2010s ====
List of singles as lead artist, showing year released and album name
Title	Year	Album
"To Plant a Seed"	2009	To Plant a Seed
"Roads That Don't End and Views That Never Cease"	2009	To Plant a Seed
"To Move on Is to Grow"	2010	To Plant a Seed (Deluxe Edition Bonus Track)
"Mis//Understanding"	2011	Understanding What We've Grown to Be
"Understanding What We've Grown to Be"	2011	Understanding What We've Grown to Be
"Just Keep Breathing"	2011	Understanding What We've Grown to Be
"What I Wished I Never Had"	2011	Understanding What We've Grown to Be
"A War Inside"	2011	Understanding What We've Grown to Be
"Let These Words Last Forever"	2012	Understanding What We've Grown to Be (Deluxe Edition)
"Fair-Weather"	2013	Non-album single
"Hope"	2013	Understanding What We've Grown to Be (Deluxe Edition)/Tracing Back Roots
"Tracing Back Roots"	2013	Tracing Back Roots
"Fade Away"	2013	Tracing Back Roots
"Never Let Me Go"	2013	Tracing Back Roots
"Ghosts"	2014	Tracing Back Roots
"I Knew You Were Trouble" (Taylor Swift cover)	2014	Punk Goes Pop Vol. 6
"The World I Used to Know"	2015	We Came as Romans
"Regenerate"	2015	We Came as Romans
"Tear It Down"	2015	We Came as Romans
"Who Will Pray?"	2015	We Came as Romans
"Wasted Age"	2016	Cold Like War
"Cold Like War"	2017	Cold Like War
"Lost in the Moment"	2017	Cold Like War
"Foreign Fire"	2017	Cold Like War
"Carry the Weight / From the First Note"	2019	Non-album single

==== 2020s ====
List of singles as lead artist, showing year released and album name
Title	Year	Peak chart positions	Album
Title	Year	US Main. Rock	Album
"Darkbloom"	2021	—	Darkbloom
"Black Hole" (featuring Caleb Shomo of Beartooth)	2021	48	Darkbloom
"Daggers" (featuring Zero 9:36)	2021	—	Darkbloom
"Darkbloom" (reimagined; featuring Brand of Sacrifice)	2022	—	Non-album single
"Plagued"	2022	—	Darkbloom
"Golden"	2022	—	Darkbloom
"Promise You"	2022	—	Darkbloom
"Bad Luck"	2025	35	All Is Beautiful...Because We're Doomed
"No Rest For the Dreamer"	2025	—	All Is Beautiful...Because We're Doomed
"Culture Wound"	2025	—	All Is Beautiful...Because We're Doomed
"Where Did You Go?"	2025	—	All Is Beautiful...Because We're Doomed
"Red Smoke" (featuring Heavensgate)	2026	—	All Is Beautiful...Because We're Doomed: Circularity
"Culture Wound" (featuring Ladrones)	2026	—	All Is Beautiful...Because We're Doomed: Circularity
"One by One" (featuring Dayseeker)	2026	—	All Is Beautiful...Because We're Doomed: Circularity
"B2TM" (featuring Bury Tomorrow)	2026	—	All Is Beautiful...Because We're Doomed: Circularity
"Born from Nothing"	2026	—	All Is Beautiful...Because We're Doomed: Circularity
"Where Did You Go?" (featuring Headwreck)	2026	—	All Is Beautiful...Because We're Doomed: Circularity
"Dead Silent" (featuring Make Them Suffer)	2026	—	All Is Beautiful...Because We're Doomed: Circularity

=== Music videos ===
Year	Song	Album	Director(s)
2009	"Roads That Don't End and Views That Never Cease"	To Plant a Seed	Aaron Marsh & Austin Saya
2009	"Broken Statues"	To Plant a Seed	Aaron Marsh & Austin Saya
2010	"To Plant a Seed"	To Plant a Seed	Scott Hansen
2010	"To Move on Is to Grow"	To Plant a Seed	Dan Dobi
2011	"Mis//Understanding" (Live from Warped Tour)	Understanding What We've Grown to Be	Cole Dabney
2011	"Mis//Understanding"	Understanding What We've Grown to Be	Travis Kopach
2011	"Just Keep Breathing"	Understanding What We've Grown to Be	Travis Kopach
2012	"What I Wished I Never Had"	Understanding What We've Grown to Be	Cole Dabney
2012	"Understanding What We've Grown to Be"	Understanding What We've Grown to Be	Travis Kopach
2012	"Glad You Came" (The Wanted cover)	Punk Goes Pop Volume 5	Justyn Moro
2013	"Hope"	Tracing Back Roots	Dan Kennedy & Rasa Acharya
2013	"Fade Away"	Tracing Back Roots	Dan Kennedy & Rasa Acharya
2013	"Tracing Back Roots" (Live from Warped Tour)	Tracing Back Roots	Joel Pilotte
2013	"Never Let Me Go"	Tracing Back Roots	Dan Dobi
2014	"Ghosts"	Tracing Back Roots	Carlo Oppermann
2014	"I Knew You Were Trouble" (Taylor Swift cover)	Punk Goes Pop Vol. 6	Dan Centrone
2015	"Regenerate"	We Came as Romans	Nathan Williams
2015	"The World I Used to Know"	We Came as Romans	Nathan Williams
2015	"Who Will Pray?"	We Came as Romans	Sam Schneider
2016	"Memories"	We Came as Romans	Carlo Oppermann
2017	"Cold Like War"	Cold Like War	Orie McGinness
2017	"Lost in the Moment"	Cold Like War	Orie McGinness
2017	"Foreign Fire"	Cold Like War	Orie McGinness
2019	"Carry the Weight"	Non-album singles	Orie McGinness
2020	"From the First Note"	Non-album singles	Orie McGinness
2021	"Darkbloom"	Darkbloom	Orie McGinness
2021	"Black Hole"	Darkbloom	Jensen Noen
2021	"Daggers"	Darkbloom	Wombat Fire
2022	"Golden"	Darkbloom	Orie McGinness
2022	"Promise You"	Darkbloom	Paxton Powell
2025	"Bad Luck"	All Is Beautiful...Because We're Doomed	George Gallardo Kattah
2025	"Culture Wound"	All Is Beautiful...Because We're Doomed	George Gallardo Kattah
2025	"One By One"	All Is Beautiful...Because We're Doomed	George Gallardo Kattah

== Concert tours ==
- The Emptiness Tour – Alesana, A Skylit Drive, The Word Alive and Of Mice & Men (February–March 2010)
- We Are Not Meaningless – Four Letter Lie and Life on Repeat (April–May 2010)
- The Welcome to the Circus Tour – Asking Alexandria, From First to Last, Our Last Night and A Bullet for Pretty Boy (May–June 2010)
- Scream It Like You Mean It 2010 – Silverstein, Emery, Dance Gavin Dance, I Set My Friends on Fire, Sky Eats Airplane, Ivoryline and Close to Home (July–August 2010)
- Band of Brothers Tour – In Fear and Faith, Confide, Upon a Burning Body and Abandon All Ships (August–October 2010)
- Impericon Never Say Die! European Tour – Parkway Drive, Comeback Kid, Bleeding Through, War from a Harlots Mouth, Emmure and Your Demise (October–November 2010)
- No Sleep Til Festival Tour – Megadeth, NOFX, Dropkick Murphys, Parkway Drive, GWAR, Alkaline Trio, Frenzal Rhomb, Suicide Silence, August Burns Red, Katatonia and 3 Inches of Blood (December 2010)
- Rock Yourself to Sleep Tour – Woe, Is Me, For Today, The Word Alive and Texas in July (January–February 2011)
- Game Changers Tour – A Day to Remember (March–April 2011)
- Scream It Like You Mean It 2011 European Tour – Miss May I, The Word Alive and This or the Apocalypse (April–May 2011)
- Vans Warped Tour 2011 (June–August 2011)
- Take A Picture, It Will Last Longer Tour – Falling in Reverse, Sleeping with Sirens, Attila, Emmure and For All I Am (November–December 2011)
- December to Remember Festival – Of Mice & Men, Winds of Plague, Blessthefall, The Word Alive, Motionless in White, As Blood Runs Black, For the Fallen Dreams, Upon A Burning Body, Like Moths To Flames, In the Midst of Lions, At The Skylines and The Great Commission (December 18, 2011)
- European 2012 Tour – Alesana, Iwrestledabearonce and Glamour of the Kill (January–February 2012)
- The Fire and Ice Tour – Emmure, Blessthefall, Woe, is Me and The Color Morale (March–April 2012)
- Scream It Like You Mean It Tour – Attack Attack!, The Acacia Strain, Woe, Is Me, Abandon All Ships, Oceano, The Chariot, Like Moths to Flames, In Fear & Faith, For All Those Sleeping, Close to Home, Volumes, Secrets, Hands Like Houses, Glass Cloud and At the Skylines (July–August 2012)
- The Road to Warped Tour – Like Moths to Flames, Upon A Burning Body, Crown the Empire, Set it Off and Ice Nine Kills (June 2013)
- Warped Tour 2013 (June–August 2013)
- Take Action Tour – The Used, Crown The Empire and Mindflow (January–March 2013)
- Tracing Back Roots Tour – We Came as Romans, Silverstein, Chunk! No, Captain Chunk!, The Color Morale, Dangerkids (October–November 2013)
- Van's Warped Tour 2013 UK (November 2013)
- Past, Present, Future Tour – For Today, The Color Morale and Palisades (September–October 2014)
- December Tour – Chiodos, Sleepwave and Slaves (December 2014)
- Warped Tour 2015 (June–August 2015)
- Unbreakable Tour – Parkway Drive and Counterparts (September–October 2016)
- Rage on Stage Tour – I Prevail, The Word Alive and Escape the Fate (September–December 2017)
- Cold Like War Tour – The Plot in You, Oceans Ate Alaska, Currents and Tempting Fate (February–April 2018)
- European Tour – Alazka, The Plot in You and Polaris (April–May 2018)
- Fall Tour – Bullet for My Valentine and Bad Omens (September–October 2018)
- Spring 2019 – Crown the Empire, Erra and SHVPES (March–April 2019)
- Trick 'R Treat Tour – Motionless in White, After the Burial and Twiztid (September–October 2019)

== Awards ==
On August 26, 2013, the band's video for "A War Inside", directed by Cole Dabney, won the 2013 Music Video Directors Association's Award for "Best Live Performance/Tour Video".
