= Cold Like War =

Studio album by We Came as Romans
- Released: October 20, 2017
- Genre: Metalcore; post-hardcore
- Length: 39:49
- Label: SharpTone
- Producer: Drew Fulk; Nick Sampson

We Came as Romans chronology
We Came as Romans (2015)	Cold Like War (2017)	Darkbloom (2022)

Singles from Cold Like War
- 1. "Wasted Age" Released: September 29, 2016; 2. "Cold Like War" Released: September 11, 2017; 3. "Lost in the Moment" Released: September 21, 2017; 4. "Foreign Fire" Released: October 19, 2017

Cold Like War is the fifth studio album by American metalcore band We Came as Romans. It was released on October 20, 2017, and is their first album through SharpTone Records. This is the band's first album to feature new drummer David Puckett, who replaced longtime drummer Eric Choi, and their last with singer Kyle Pavone before his death in August 2018.

== Videos ==
On September 29, 2016, We Came as Romans presented the first single taken from this album, called "Wasted Age". On September 11, 2017, it was released through SharpTone Records YouTube channel a video for "Cold Like War", followed 10 days later by "Lost in the Moment". On October 19, 2017, the day before the album came out, the music video for "Foreign Fire" was released.

== Critical reception ==
Alternative Press considered Cold Like War like a "milestone for WCAR", considering that "they have expanded their range of sounds, emotions and songwriting capabilities without compromising their sincerity". Louder Sound said that We Came as Romans, during its first album through SharpTone Records, "strive to make an impression", creating a "never boring record".

== Track listing ==
No.	Title	Length
1.	"Vultures with Clipped Wings"	4:05
2.	"Cold Like War"	3:46
3.	"Two Hands"	3:54
4.	"Lost in the Moment"	4:13
5.	"Foreign Fire"	3:54
6.	"Wasted Age"	3:47
7.	"Encoder"	3:20
8.	"If There's Nothing to See" (featuring Eric Vanlerberghe of I Prevail)	4:35
9.	"Promise Me"	3:45
10.	"Learning to Survive"	4:30
Total length:		39:49

== Personnel ==
=== We Came as Romans ===
- Dave Stephens – lead vocals
- Kyle Pavone – clean vocals, keyboards, piano, synthesizer
- Joshua Moore – lead guitar, backing vocals
- Lou Cotton – rhythm guitar
- Andy Glass – bass guitar, backing vocals
- David Puckett – drums, percussion

=== Guest musicians ===
- Eric Vanlerberghe (I Prevail) — Guest Vocals on "If There's Nothing to See"

== Charts ==
Chart (2017)	Peak position
US Billboard 200	61
