= We Came as Romans (album) =

Studio album by We Came as Romans
- Released: July 24, 2015
- Genre: Alternative metal; nu metal
- Length: 33:33
- Label: Equal Vision; Spinefarm; Caroline Australia
- Producer: David Bendeth

We Came as Romans chronology
Tracing Back Roots (2013)	We Came as Romans (2015)	Cold Like War (2017)

Singles from We Came as Romans
- 1. "The World I Used to Know" Released: May 26, 2015; 2. "Regenerate" Released: June 9, 2015; 3. "Tear It Down" Released: July 10, 2015; 4. "Who Will Pray?" Released: December 16, 2015

We Came as Romans is the fourth studio album by American metalcore band We Came as Romans. It was released on July 24, 2015 through Equal Vision Records. As with Tracing Back Roots, the album continues to see a departure of the band's metalcore sound found in their previous albums, in favor of a melodic rock sound.

The album's first single, "The World I Used to Know", was released on May 26, 2015.

This is the last album released during long time drummer Eric Choi's tenure with the band before his departure in early October 2016. This is also the band's final album on Equal Vision Records.

The album sold 22,600 copies in its first week, being considered a solid release despite selling less than their 2013 record, Tracing Back Roots, that sold over 26,500 copies in its debut week.

== Genre ==
According to Kill Your Stereo, the band continues to "grow out of their heavier metalcore roots and move towards a more alternative metal, melodic direction" with their self-titled album featuring a "more mature" sound.

== Background ==
Singer Dave Stephens has said that the songwriting was very intense with new producer David Bendeth. 40 songs were written for the album, but only 10 made it onto the final track list. The album's cover painting was done by Paul Romano, who also created the cover of the first three albums To Plant a Seed (2009), Understanding What We've Grown to Be (2012) and Tracing Back Roots (2013).

The album was streamed via SoundCloud on July 21, through the Huffington Post and Kerrang! websites.

== Videos ==
On June 8, 2015, the music video for the first track on the album, "Regenerate" was posted on the Equal Vision Records YouTube channel, as well as the We Came as Romans VEVO channel, due to signing with Spinefarm on Europe. On July 23, 2015, the music video for "The World I Used to Know" was posted on VEVO. On December 16, 2015, the band premiered the music video for "Who Will Pray?" exclusively with Kerrang!. The video was posted on VEVO and YouTube soon after.

== Critical reception ==
Professional ratings
Review scores
Source	Rating
Alternative Press	4/5 stars
Ultimate Guitar	5/10

We Came as Romans received mixed reviews from critics and fans, mostly because of their departure from the metalcore sound from their previous albums. Awarding the album four stars from Alternative Press, Mischa Pearlman states, "The 10 songs are full of catchy hooks that aren't full-on pop, but aren't too far off, either ... We Came As Romans lends weight to the glossy sheen of songs that might otherwise be dismissed as too slick and too superficial."

== Track listing ==
No.	Title	Length
1.	"Regenerate"	3:47
2.	"Who Will Pray?"	3:23
3.	"The World I Used to Know"	3:14
4.	"Memories"	2:58
5.	"Tear It Down"	3:23
6.	"Blur"	3:14
7.	"Savior of the Week"	3:16
8.	"Flatline"	3:26
9.	"Defiance"	3:00
10.	"12:30"	3:52
Total length:		33:33

Target bonus track
No.	Title	Length
11.	"One Way Ticket"	3:30
Total length:		37:03

Acoustic bonus tracks
No.	Title	Length
12.	"Hope"	4:04
13.	"A Moment"	4:00
Total length:		45:07

== Personnel ==
We Came as Romans

- Dave Stephens – lead vocals
- Kyle Pavone – clean vocals, keyboards, piano, synthesizer
- Joshua Moore – lead guitar, backing vocals
- Lou Cotton – rhythm guitar
- Andy Glass – bass guitar, backing vocals
- Eric Choi – drums (credited)

Production

- David Bendeth – record producer, mixing, arrangements
- Ted Jensen – mastering at Sterling Sound, New York, NY
- Aaron Marsh, Nick Sampson, Scott Stevens – programming
- Michael "Mitch" Milan – engineering, programming, digital editing
- Adam Mott and Rick Sales – management
- Jacoby Nelson – engineering, digital editing
- Brian Robbins – digital editing, engineering, mix engineering, programming
- Greg Johnson - programming
- Paul A. Romano – art direction, artwork & design
- Daniel Sandshaw – A&R
- Bill Scoville – design

== Charts ==
Chart (2015)	Peak position
Australian Albums (ARIA)	29
German Albums (Offizielle Top 100)	82
UK Album Downloads (OCC)	97
UK Rock & Metal Albums (OCC)	14
US Billboard 200	11
US Independent Albums (Billboard)	2
US Top Hard Rock Albums (Billboard)	2
US Top Rock Albums (Billboard)	2
