= Scream It Like You Mean It =

- 2012 Tour Logo
- Genre: Post-hardcore, metalcore, alternative rock, pop punk, electronic rock, deathcore, dubstep
- Locations: United States, Canada, Europe
- Years active: 2010–2013
- Founders: Dave Shapiro, Matthew Stewart, Yogi Allgood
- Website: www.screamitlikeyoumeanit.com

Scream It Like You Mean It was an annual tour put on by founders and owners Dave Shapiro of Los-Angeles–based The Agency Group Ltd. and Matthew Stewart of Washington, D.C.–based Outerloop Management. Anthony "Yogi" Allgood was also a founder, owner, and creator of this tour from 2010 to 2013, but has since left Outerloop. Stewart also left in January 2014.

The national tour throughout 2010–2011 reached the United States and Europe, and 2012–2013 reached throughout the United States. According to co-owner Stewart, "the whole point of this tour and the reason we're doing this for the third straight year is because we try our hardest to make [the tour] a positive experience for both the fans and the artists on it." Stewart also mentioned that "in 2012 or 2013 we’d like to have the tour in the US, Europe, and Australia. We’d like to make it a world brand."

== 2010 ==
The first tour featured eight main bands playing 26 shows, during July and August. Electric Zombie and MerchNow were sponsors.

=== Bands ===
- Silverstein
- Emery
- We Came as Romans
- Dance Gavin Dance
- I Set My Friends on Fire
- Sky Eats Airplane
- Ivoryline
- Close to Home

== 2011 Europe ==
The second tour featured four main bands playing 21 shows, during April and May. Avocado Booking and Outerloop Management were sponsors.

=== Bands ===
- We Came as Romans
- Miss May I
- The Word Alive
- This or the Apocalypse

== 2011 US ==
The third tour featured six bands playing 37 shows, during July and August. Music Skins and MerchNow sponsored the tour.

=== Bands ===
- Breathe Carolina
- Chiodos
- I See Stars
- The Color Morale
- ModSun
- The Air I Breathe

== 2012 ==
The fourth tour featured 18 bands, reaching 49 cities over five and a half weeks (July 5 through August 12), and featured two stages; however, the tour was divided into two separate tours (entitled Blue or Red) which criss-crossed each other at multiple dates (entitled Gold). The Blue tour headliner was The Acacia Strain, and the Red tour headliner was Attack Attack!. MerchNow and LA GEAR sponsored the tour. Due to the closing of the venue Sonar in Baltimore, MD, the tour's last date was August 11, 2012, at Empire in Springfield, Virginia (Blue tour).

=== Bands ===
- Attack Attack!
- We Came as Romans
- The Acacia Strain
- Woe, Is Me
- Abandon All Ships
- Oceano
- Impending Doom
- The Chariot
- Texas in July
- Like Moths To Flames
- In Fear and Faith
- For All Those Sleeping
- Close to Home
- Volumes
- Secrets
- Hands Like Houses
- Glass Cloud
- At the Skylines

== 2013 ==
The fifth tour featured seven bands, reaching 27 cities and dates during October and ending on November 5, 2013, in New York City. The lineup was heavily criticized for the smaller number of bands.

=== Bands ===
- Story of the Year
- Like Moths to Flames
- Hawthorne Heights
- Capture the Crown
- Set It Off
- Sienna Skies
- I Am King
- Silverstein (select dates)

Capture the Crown dropped off the tour in late October due to mechanical problems with their transportation.

Due to issues with attendance, a 2014 tour was not set up. It was unclear whether the tour would be back in 2015; as of March 2016 nothing had been announced.
