= To Plant a Seed =

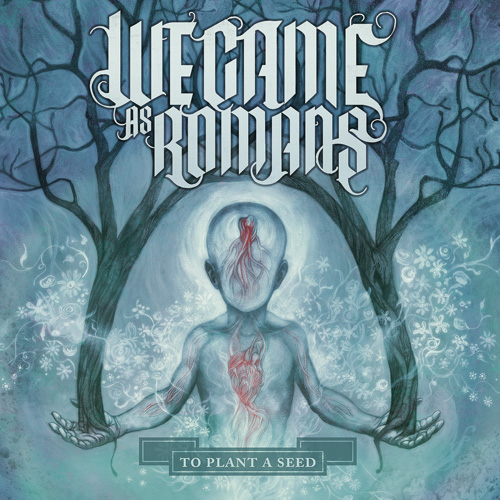

Studio album by We Came as Romans
- Released: November 3, 2009
- Recorded: 2009
- Genres: Metalcore; post-hardcore; electronicore
- Length: 37:17
- Label: Equal Vision
- Producer: Joey Sturgis

We Came as Romans chronology
Dreams (2008)	To Plant a Seed (2009)	Understanding What We've Grown to Be (2011)

To Plant a Seed is the debut studio album by American metalcore band We Came as Romans. It was released by Equal Vision Records on November 3, 2009 and was produced by Joey Sturgis. The album's artwork was created by Paul Romano. Guitarist Joshua Moore explained that the lyrical themes on To Plant a Seed are focused on spreading a positive message. A deluxe edition of the album was released on January 18, 2011, which includes one bonus track and a DVD titled To Plant a DVD.

The songs "Dreams" and "Intentions" were rerecorded from the band's Dreams EP.

== Music and lyrics ==
To Plant a Seed combines elements of metalcore and post-hardcore. AllMusic stated that the album has elements of "traditional hardcore". Alternative Press stated that the album's style represents scene music. The album's lyrics explore themes such as personal development.

Professional ratings
Review scores
Source	Rating
AbsolutePunk	(64%)
AllMusic	2.5/5 stars
Alternative Press	1.5/5 stars
Review Rinse Repeat	1.5/5 stars
SputnikMusic	3/5 stars
Ultimate Guitar Archive	(9.1/10)

== Track listing ==
All songs written by Joshua Moore and Dave Stephens.

No.	Title	Length
1.	"To Plant a Seed"	3:51
2.	"Broken Statues"	3:41
3.	"Intentions" (featuring Tyler Smith)	3:01
4.	"Roads That Don't End and Views That Never Cease"	3:49
5.	"Dreams"	4:15
6.	"We Are the Reasons"	3:43
7.	"Beliefs"	4:06
8.	"I Will Not Reap Destruction"	3:58
9.	"Searching, Seeking, Reaching, Always"	2:56
10.	"An Ever-Growing Wonder"	3:57
Total length:		37:17

Deluxe edition bonus tracks
No.	Title	Length
11.	"To Move On Is to Grow"	3:47
Total length:		41:04

To Plant a DVD chapter listings

- 01. Intro
- 02. To Plant a Seed (Live)
- 03. Making the Band
- 04. Intentions (Live)
- 05. Music with Meaning
- 06. We Are the Reasons (Live)
- 07. Tour Life
- 08. To Move On Is to Grow (Live)
- 09. Wacko Jacko
- 10. Roads That Don't End And Views That Never Cease (Live)
- 11. Credits
- 12. To Move On Is to Grow (Video)

== Charts ==
Chart	Peak position
U.S. Billboard 200	175
U.S. Billboard Hard Rock Albums	13
U.S. Billboard Independent Albums	25
U.S. Billboard Top Heatseekers	6

== Personnel ==
We Came as Romans

- Dave Stephens – unclean vocals
- Kyle Pavone – clean vocals, keyboards, piano, synthesizer
- Joshua Moore – lead guitar, backing vocals
- Lou Cotton – rhythm guitar
- Andy Glass – bass guitar, backing vocals
- Eric Choi – drums

Production

- Produced, engineered, mixed, and mastered by Joey Sturgis
- Additional editing by Nick Sampson
- Programming and additional keys by Joey Sturgis
- Art direction, artwork and design by Paul Romano
- Photography by Phil Mamula
- Management by Matthew Stewart & Mike Mowery for Outerloop Management
- Booking by JJ Cassiere for The Kirby Organisation
- A&R by D. Sandshaw
