= Close to Home (band) =

American post-hardcore band

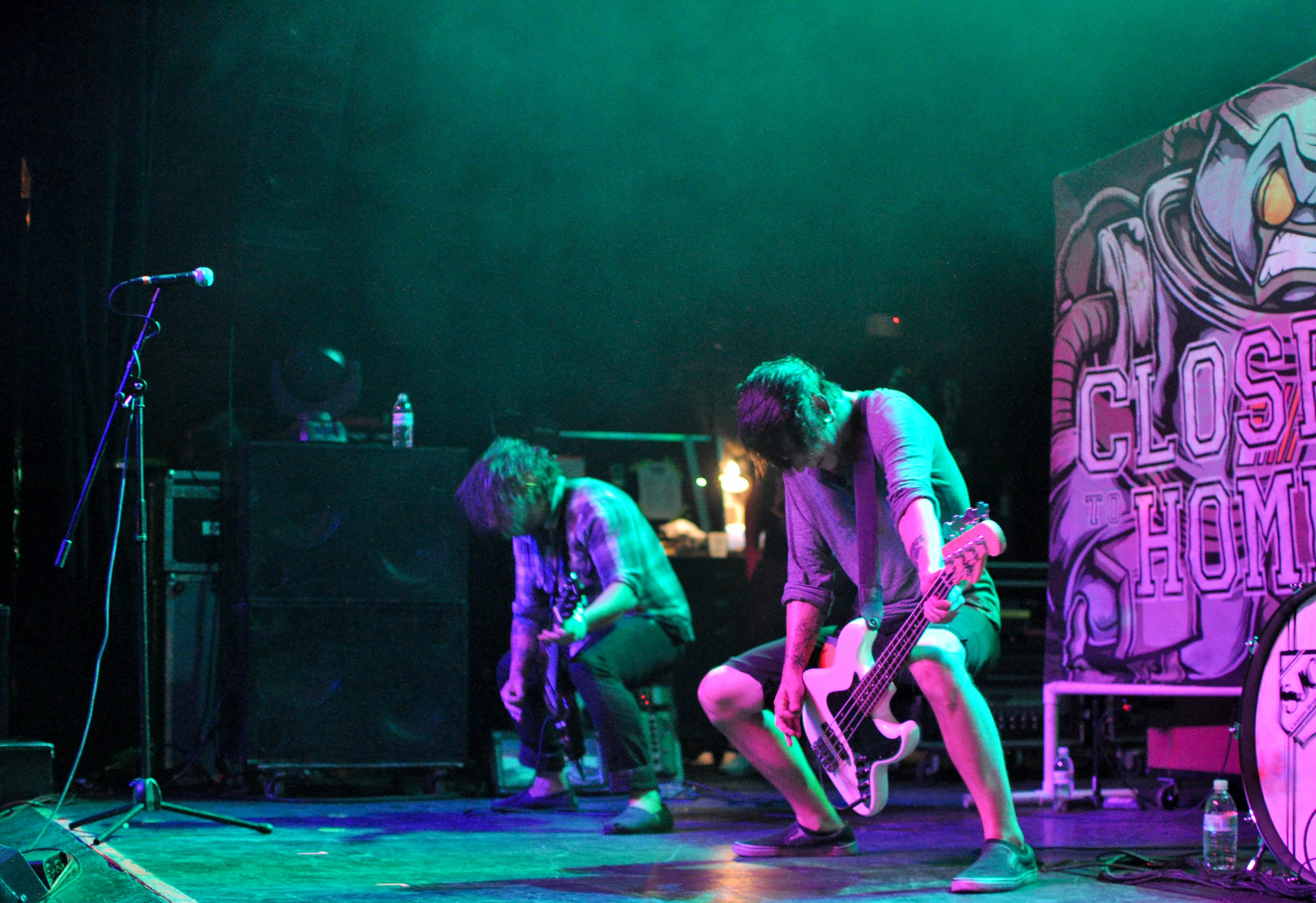
- Close to Home on the "I'm Alive Tour" in 2011

Background information
- Origin: Cincinnati, Ohio, US
- Genres: Post-hardcore, melodic hardcore, metalcore
- Years active: 2005–2015
- Labels: Artery, Razor & Tie
- Past members: Josh Wells; JJ Cooper; Travis Hartman; Andrew DeNeef; Josh Trenkamp; Justin Wells; Brad Andress; Dan Reder; Nick Stiens; Jon Grubbs; Ben Bruner; Eric Cronstein; Eric Keyes
- Website: arteryrecordings.com/mainsite/artist/close-to-home

Close to Home was an American post-hardcore band from Cincinnati, Ohio, United States, that was formed in 2005. They have released two EPs (three mixed, one demo) and three full-length albums, Picture Perfect; their major label debut, Never Back Down, which was released on February 15, 2011; and their most recent effort, Momentum, which was released July 31, 2012 via Artery Recordings. Close to Home has toured across the United States and Europe with bands such as Silverstein, Emery, Dance Gavin Dance, In Fear and Faith, We Came as Romans, and Electric Callboy. They have also participated in 2010 and 2012's Scream It Like You Mean It tours. On December 10, 2010, they signed with Artery Recordings; however this contract has been fulfilled. The band was previously managed by Outerloop Management. Close to Home is commonly depicted as CTH.

== History ==
=== Formation and Basement Recordings Picture Perfect, One Chance, One Time (Pre-2005–2006) ===
In 2005, brothers Josh and Justin Wells formed the band "Close to Home" with their friend, bassist Brad Andress in Cincinnati, Ohio. Prior to label involvement, or a record release, Close to Home was invited to perform three western United States dates (Montana, Denver, and Salt Lake City) on the Vans Warped Tour 2005. In 2006, while on their first non-festival tour, Andress was diagnosed with cancer (in Seattle). While Andress was hospitalized, Close to Home was again invited to perform three southern United States dates (Orlando, Miami, and Tampa) on the Vans Warped Tour 2006. In October 2006, Andress died.

=== Legends Live On, Standby, and Let It Be Known EPs (2006–2009) ===
After the death of bassist Brad Andress, Close to Home spent most of 2006 getting their members to today's lineup (minus vocalist changes): Josh Wells (Guitar), JJ Cooper (Guitar), and Travis Hartman (Drums). It has been confirmed that guitarists Josh Wells and JJ Cooper have recorded all the bass lines since the death of Brad Andress. "Legends Live On" EP was released via iTunes April 7, 2008 and was the last live show that bassist Brad Andress played before his death. According to guitarist Josh Wells "The remaining four tracks on the record are about Brad Andress and losing someone." Wells also stated that because of Andress' death, "Close to Home does not have a permanent bass musician". In 2007, Close to Home won the United States, Ernie Ball "Battle of the Bands". This allowed Close to Home to play one night on the acclaimed Taste of Chaos Tour. According to guitarist Josh Wells, they "played for 13,000 people, sharing the stage with The Used, 30 Seconds To Mars, Chiodos, Senses Fail, Saosin, Aiden, and Evaline, and were given prizes such as a drum set, bass rig, among items." In 2007, Close to Home became a three-peat performer on Vans Warped Tour, performing at Vans Warped Tours 2007 and 2008 in Cincinnati. "Standby" EP was released via iTunes on April 29, 2008. Shortly after, Close to Home embarked on the "V-Neck and Shaved Chest" Tour (June 2008) with We Came as Romans. Let It Be Known EP features vocalist Shane Told of Silverstein on "Promise"; and following this release, the band toured a leg with Poison The Well and The Sleeping. During this time, the band were also spokespeople for Sexy Hair products.

=== Tour Activity (2009–2010) ===
Close to Home appeared on a mini-tour (September - October 2009) with I Am Abomination. Close to Home also embarked on the "Scream It Like You Mean It 2010" Tour (July - August 2010) with Silverstein, Emery, Dance Gavin Dance, I Set My Friends on Fire, Sky Eats Airplane, Ivoryline, and We Came as Romans. Andy Glass from We Came as Romans filled in on bass for the complete tour.

=== Never Back Down (2010–2011) ===
Excerpt from the band's MySpace blog:

"Never Back Down is our first label debut album! We spent all of 2010 creating this record and getting everything in place to release it! I just wanted to take a moment to tell you a little about the process of making this record and what the concept for it was. When we were first told we would be doing a full-length we sat down and put a lot of thought in what direction we wanted to go with it, musically and lyrically. We have always tried our best to be real in everything we do and write what is real to us so the concept of the record formed there. We decided to make a record that would be an exact reflection of our lives, in a way that any one can appreciate. For those who have been supporting us for a long time you know about the struggles we have gone through personally and business wise in pursuit of what we love. It has never been an easy journey but we have always been relentless and 'DIY' in our efforts. The album title and artwork are fairly simple in what it portrays. Being the underdog and coming up against something massive in front of you. The content of the record itself is something we are all very proud of. Musically it is influenced by everything we have ever loved and we believe will take the listener on a journey. It shows the good and the bad of going after what you love and sacrificing everything. We tried to show that also musically as much as lyrically. Some songs are a lot more fun and tell the good side of our lives. The friendship, traveling, partying, creating memorable moments in life worth fighting for and just a love for the people and music itself. The other side to that is some of the heaviest music we have wrote yet and portrays the downsides and struggles. Always being gone and slipping away from understanding what it will ever be like to be 'normal' again. The strain it puts on friendships and all relationships in life. The people who want to pollute the music, talk shit, and infect it with impure intentions. We shot a music video to the song 'All We Know' which is a summary of what the record is about. The album name Never Back Down comes out of this song. We wanted the record to be something anyone who has ever pursued what they love in life, sacrificed or overcome great obstacles could appreciate. Can't wait for people to give it a listen from beginning to end! To hear it as one total work and give us feedback". - Close to Home

The album was often compared to A Day to Remember because of the similar vocal style and genre, combining elements of heavy post-hardcore and metalcore with pop punk, leading to a melodic hardcore sound.

On February 25, 2011, "All We Know" was released as the first official single from Never Back Down, along with a music video.

Close to Home appeared on the Downtown Battle Mountain Tour (March - April 2011) supporting Dance Gavin Dance, Iwrestledabearonce and In Fear and Faith in support of Never Back Down. According to a Facebook post by the band on June 6, 2011, bassist Derek Foust was officially named the current tour bassist for Close to Home during this time. Close to Home performed on the Arkaik + MerchNow + Artery "Summer Partery" Tour (July - August 2011) in support of In Fear and Faith and Vanna.

On February 16, 2012, it was revealed that the opening track on Never Back Down entitled "Intro" was used in the Chinese multinational personal technology company Lenovo Group Limited's 0:33-second commercial entitled "The Jetpack: When Do Gets Done".

=== Momentum (2011–2013) ===
According to Close to Home guitarist, Josh Wells, the band entered the studio shortly after the Arkaik + MerchNow + Artery "Summer Partery" Tour to record the follow-up to Never Back Down. Close to Home provided support on the Merchnow.com + Arkaik Clothing "I'm Alive" Tour (September - October 2011) with We Came as Romans and additional support from Miss May I, Of Mice & Men, and Texas in July. Close to Home and We Came as Romans also played the Kent, Ohio Festival at The Outpost with Worth The Wait and Ionia on October 15, 2011. According to lead vocalist Nick Stiens, Close to Home will re-enter the recording studio in November 2011. Close to Home are scheduled to play two Christmas shows, the first on December 17, 2011, at Penny Road Pub in Barrington, Illinois, as direct support for The Color Morale, and the second as headliner for "Rock The Halls" on December 22, 2011, at the Madison Theater in Covington, Kentucky, with support from Sea Over Comfort, Keep Me From Dreaming, Taking Regan, and Put to Rest. The latter marked the first hometown show for the band in seven months. Confirmed by the band via Facebook, Close to Home will also be recording from January until early March 2012 with engineer and producer Andrew Wade (A Day to Remember, The Word Alive). Lead vocalist, Nick Stiens announced his departure unofficially in November 2011; and officially announced on February 2, 2012, that he would not be active with the band (currently in Ocala, Florida to begin tracking and recording the next record) and has left the band via his Facebook page. According to the band's Facebook page, instrumental tracking was complete around the end of February 2012. Vocal tracking began early March 2012; although it was unclear who had been selected as the replacement vocalist. On March 22, 2012, AMP announced that "the band will head out this Spring and are co-headlining ["The Great American Roar" tour] with Ice Nine Kills with support by For All I Am and One Year Later (April - May 2012)." Guitarist Josh Wells added, "After being in the studio for two months we are all super excited to get back out on the road. I can't wait to show people how awesome some of these new songs are live, and how much Andrew [DeNeef is] killing it vocally." On April 18, 2012, Close to Home were announced as part of the "Scream It Like You Mean It 2012" tour (July - August 2012) alongside headliner Attack Attack! with We Came as Romans, The Acacia Strain, Oceano, Like Moths to Flames, Impending Doom, Woe, Is Me, Abandon All Ships, Secrets, Volumes, For All Those Sleeping, The Chariot, Glass Cloud, At The Skylines, Texas in July, In Fear and Faith, and Hands Like Houses; they are currently embarked on this tour. On May 23, 2012, the band released their first single from Momentum entitled "Backstabbers Need Not Apply". According to guitarist JJ Cooper on May 25, 2012, Derek Foust is no longer a touring member of the band; and Josh Trenkamp (former member of Sea of Treachery) is filling in on bass during the "Scream It Like You Mean It 2012" tour. Close to Home released their second single entitled "Family Ties" on June 27, 2012; which features Kyle Pavone and Dave Stephens of We Came as Romans. Momentum's original release date of July 17, 2012 was pushed back to July 31, 2012 for undisclosed reasons; and was made available via iTunes and MerchNow on its release date via Artery Recordings. In the first week of release, Momentum reached No. 157 on the Billboard Top 200, and No. 4 on the Billboard Top New Artists. On August 9, 2012, Close to Home hit No. 4 on the Billboard Heatseekers, No. 41 on Billboard Independent Albums, and No. 21 on Billboard Hard Rock. On October 14, 2012, Close to Home performed a video shoot for an unnamed song off Momentum; and on October 17, JJ Cooper confirmed Josh Trenkamp as the official bassist in the band. Close to Home began providing direct support to Modern Day Escape on "the Harry Pot - tour" (October - November 2012), along with Picture Me Broken, however on October 29, 2012, this tour was cancelled due to Modern Day Escape dropping off the bill. To close out 2012, Close To Home provided direct support to For All Those Sleeping, along with The Browning, My Ticket Home, and Buried in Verona on "The Remember Your Roots Tour" (November - December 2012); and was added to the White Couch Production's 4th Annual "20 Bands of Christmas" show on December 8, 2012, in Palatine, Illinois along with headliner Like Moths to Flames, with support from The Color Morale, For All Those Sleeping, The Plot in You, Ice Nine Kills, The Browning, My Ticket Home, Buried in Verona, and Assassins amongst many. On November 30, 2012, Close to Home released their music video for "Don't Waste Your Breath" exclusively via Alternative Press. On December 3, 2012, it was announced via Alternative Press that "Don't Waste Your Breath" was the most shared video during the week of its release. To begin 2013, Close to Home headlined the "A Metal Christmas & A Heavy New Year Tour" (January 2013), with support from We Are Defiance, The Overseer, One Year Later, and From Atlantis. Close to Home played its first hometown show of the year on February 15, 2013, at The Thompson House in Newport, KY; and provided support to headliner Eskimo Callboy on the European "Get Drunk or Fuck Off Tour 2013" (February - March 2013), with additional support from The Browning and INTOHIMO. On February 21, 2013, Close to Home announced their headlining "The Momentum Tour" (March - April 2013) with support from Adestria, Alive in Standby, Myka Relocate, and Dismember the Fallen. Close to Home played the Thompson House in Newport, KY on June 7, 2013, with Sea of Treachery.

=== Still Standing, break-up and formation of new band (2013–15) ===
On July 10, 2013, the band announced that recording of an acoustic EP was underway via Twitter. This is the first album after their contract with Artery Recordings, Razor & Tie was fulfilled. The band stood up an IndieGoGo page in October 2013 to assist in the funding of this EP and also address their recent contract closure. This campaign ended successfully on December 8, 2013.

The band supported He Is Legend, with additional support from Sea of Treachery and The American on August 13, 2013, at the Haymarket Whiskey Bar in Louisville, KY. The band headlined a mini-tour (October 22–30, 2013) with direct support from Death of an Era; which also included Day 2 of the fall "South By So What" festival on October 26, 2013, at Quicktrip Park in Grand Prairie, Texas; providing support to headliner Sleeping With Sirens. Due to the break-up of Serianna, Death of an Era took their place on this tour. On December 9, 2013, the band was confirmed for Third String Productions' 10th Anniversary "South By So What?!" festival (March 15, 2014) at Quiktrip Park in Grand Prairie, Texas. On January 1, 2014, it was revealed that the opening track on Never Back Down entitled "Intro" was used in an NBC Sports commercial for the 2014 Sochi Olympic Games.

On January 6, 2014, the band announced their headliner on "The March Drunken Mess Tour" (February - March 2014) with Famous Last Words, Phinehas, and Climates. Climates dropped off the tour prior to its start for undisclosed reasons. On January 29, 2014, the band was confirmed for the "Never Say Never Fest" on March 12, 2014, at the Las Palmas Race Park in Mission, Texas. On April 22, 2014, the band released their acoustic EP "Still Standing". On November 3, 2015, the band released a statement stating that due to the departure of founding member Josh, the band could no longer continue on. The remaining members formed a new band called 'Actual Villains'.

== Guest appearances ==
Josh Wells confirmed his appearance as a vocalist on the tracks "Mis//Understanding" and "Understanding What We've Grown To Be" by We Came as Romans. These tracks appear on the album Understanding What We've Grown to Be, released September 13, 2011 via Equal Vision Records.

Andrew DeNeef provided guest vocals on the track "Fake Blood" by Veara. This track appears on the album Growing Up Is Killing Me, released September 24, 2013 via Epitath Records.

== Musical style ==
The band's sound is often described as combination of heavy post-hardcore and metalcore music with light pop punk and punk rock, often leading their genre to be called "melodic hardcore" in the vein of Four Year Strong, though the band has never confirmed this as their musical style.

== Band members ==
Current members

- Josh Wells – guitar, backing vocals (2005–2015)
- JJ Cooper – guitar (2007–2015)
- Travis Hartman – drums, percussion (2007–2015)
- Andrew DeNeef – lead vocals (2012–2015)
- Josh Trenkamp – bass, backing vocals (2012–2015)

Former members

- Eric Cronstein – guitar (2005)
- Ben Bruner – lead vocals (2005–2006)
- Brad Andress – bass (2005–2006; his death)
- Justin Wells – drums, percussion (2005–2007)
- Eric Keyes – bass (2006–2007)
- Dan Reder – bass (2007–2009)
- Nick Stiens – lead vocals (2007–2012)

Touring members

- Andy Glass – bass (2010–2011)
- Derek Foust – bass (2011–2012)
- Brandon Brewer – bass, backing vocals (2010–2011)

== Discography ==
Studio albums

Year	Album	Chart positions			
Year	Album	Billboard 200	Top Heatseekers	Independent Albums	Hard Rock Albums
2004	One Chance, One Time: self-released	-	-	-	-
2006	Picture Perfect: self-released	-	-	-	-
2011	Never Back Down: Released July 20, 2011; Label: Artery Recordings	-	-	-	-
2012	Momentum: Released July 31, 2012; Label: Artery Recordings	157	4	41	21

EPs

- Standby EP (self-released, April 2008)
- Let It Be Known EP (self-released, October 2009)
- Still Standing EP (self-released, April 2014)

Singles

- "You Struck a Nerve (I Struck a Match)" (2009)
- "End of an Era" (2011)
- "All We Know" (2011)
- "Backstabbers Need Not Apply" (2012)
- "Family Ties" (2012)

== Music videos ==
Year	Song	Director
2009	"Headphones"	Mat Grimes
2011	"All We Know"	Raul Gonzo
2012	"Don't Waste Your Breath"	Dan Kennedy & Rasa Acharya
