= Dave Stephens (singer) =

American singer (born 1988)

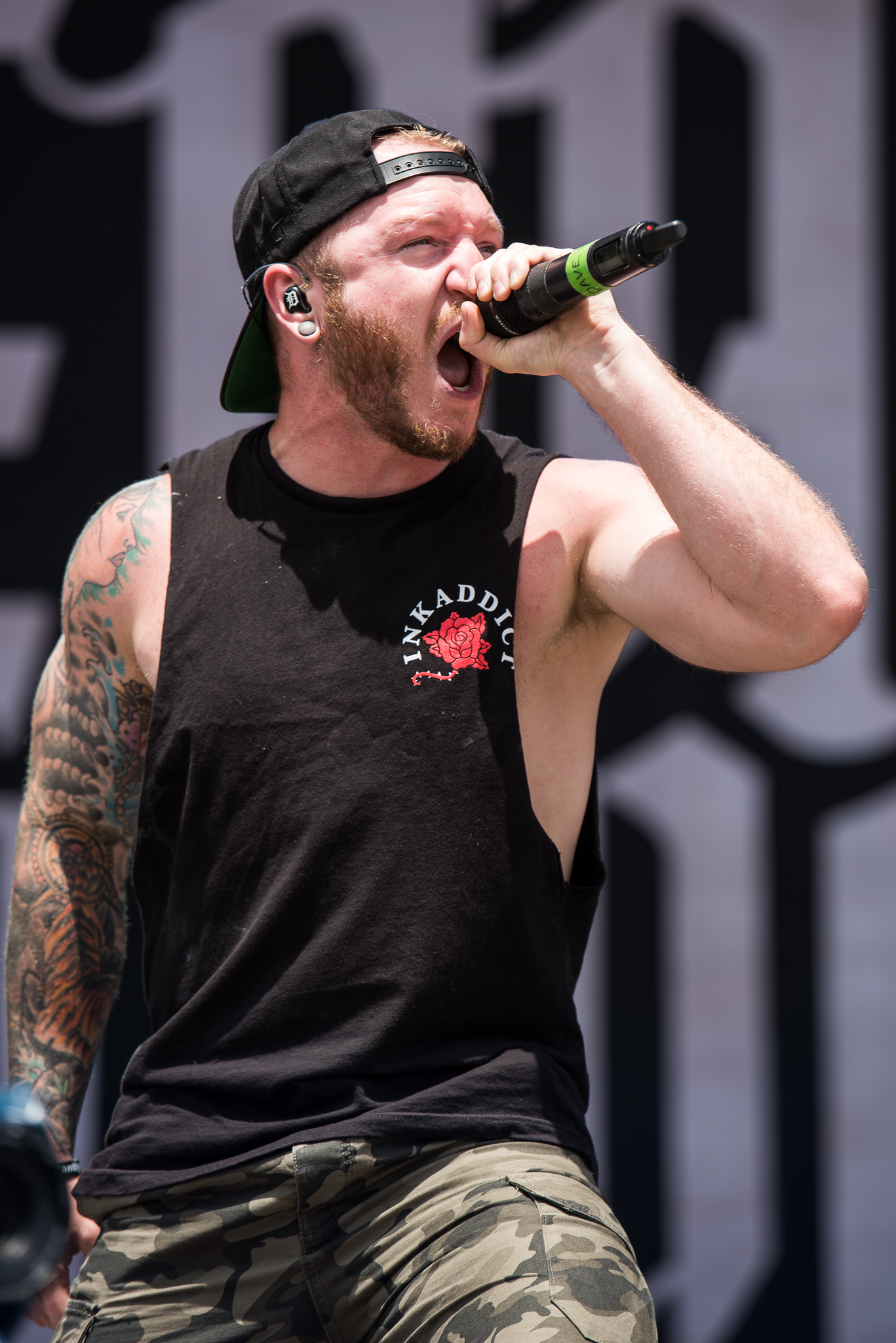
- Stephens at the Rock im Park (2016)

Background information
- Born: June 30, 1988 (age 38); Troy, Michigan, U.S.
- Genres: Metalcore; post-hardcore
- Occupations: Singer; songwriter
- Instruments: Vocals; guitar; keyboards; synthesizers
- Member of: We Came as Romans

David Stephens (born June 30, 1988) is an American singer who is a founding member and actively the lead vocalist and frontman for the metalcore band We Came as Romans.

== Music career ==
In the summer 2005, while attending high school, Stephens, along with classmates Sean Zelda, Jonny Nabors, Mark Myatt, and Joshua Moore formed a band called This Emergency. For the first few years, Stephens was the guitarist, keyboardist, and backing vocals. The band performed various shows throughout the Detroit metro area. Sometime after Nabors and Zelda left the band, the band underwent a name change as they officially called themselves We Came as Romans. In 2008, Stephens met Kyle Pavone who came on as the new clean vocalist while Stephens became the unclean vocalist.

In 2008, with both Stephens and Pavone fronting the band, We Came as Romans released its first EP Dreams and released five more studio albums up to the summer of 2018 when co-frontman, Kyle Pavone, died at the age of 28 of an accidental drug overdose. After Pavone's passing, Stephens released a statement saying the band would not replace Pavone nor would they disband, but would continue their tour with Bullet for My Valentine and Bad Omens while honoring his bandmate and talking about his foundation.

In 2019, Stephens along with the rest of We Came as Romans began creating new material. Releasing two songs for the first time since Pavone's passing, "Carry the Weight" and "From the First Note". In 2022, the band announced their first record since 2017, Darkbloom, which was the first album with Stephens as the only singer and frontman for the group.

In 2025 Stephens contributed vocals for song "Echolokators" in the rhythmic beat 'em up video game Dead as Disco.

== Discography ==
=== We Came as Romans ===
Studio albums

- To Plant a Seed (2009)
- Understanding What We've Grown to Be (2011)
- Tracing Back Roots (2013)
- We Came as Romans (2015)
- Cold Like War (2017)
- Darkbloom (2022)
- All Is Beautiful... Because We're Doomed (2025)

=== Collaborations ===
Year	Song	Album	Artist
2010	"Captain Tyin' Knots vs. Mr. Walkway (No Way)" (featuring Dave Stephens)	With Ears to See and Eyes to Hear	Sleeping with Sirens
2010	"The Wretched" (featuring Dave Stephens)	Deceiver	The Word Alive
2012	"The Calm Before Reform" (featuring Dave Stephens)	In Fear and Faith	In Fear and Faith
2012	"Family Ties" (featuring Dave Stephens and Kyle Pavone)	Momentum	Close to Home
2012	"C4" (featuring Dave Stephens)	Texas in July	Texas in July
2014	"Suicide;Stigma" (featuring Dave Stephens)	Hold On Pain Ends	The Color Morale
2015	"Like Minds" (featuring Dave Stephens)	Ungrateful • Misguided	From Under the Willow
2016	"Pit Warrior" (featuring Dave Stephens)	Friendville	Sunrise Skater Kids
2017	"Devour" (featuring Dave Stephens)	Despair Code	Affairs
2020	"Backbreaker" (featuring Dave Stephens)	Non-album singles	Fit for a King
2020	"Lie to Me" (featuring Dave Stephens)	Non-album singles	Silent Hearts
2022	"Johnny's Revenge (Revisited)" (featuring Spencer Charnas, Dave Stephens, and Craig Owens)	Non-album singles	Crown the Empire
