= Tracing Back Roots =

Studio album by We Came as Romans
- Released: July 23, 2013
- Recorded: March 13–April 23, 2013
- Genre: Metalcore; post-hardcore
- Length: 40:34 (Original release); 46:53 (Target Exclusive)
- Label: Equal Vision; Nuclear Blast; We Are Unified
- Producer: John Feldmann

We Came as Romans chronology
Understanding What We've Grown to Be (2011)	Tracing Back Roots (2013)	We Came as Romans (2015)

Professional ratings
Aggregate scores
Source	Rating
Metacritic	75/100
Review scores
Source	Rating
About.com	3.5/5 stars
AbsolutePunk	60%
HM	3/5 stars

Tracing Back Roots is the third studio album by American metalcore band We Came as Romans. It was released on July 23, 2013, through Equal Vision Records. The album is noted for the band's shift from their signature metalcore sound to a more melodic, clean vocal driven sound, while still maintaining metalcore elements throughout. The album has been received with favorable reviews which praise the band's “go out and do something with your life with purpose” message.

The album debuted at number 8 on the Billboard 200 with 26,500 copies sold in the first week. As of June 2015, this album has sold 79,000 copies in the United States.

The album's first single, "Hope", was released on January 4, 2013, and is also included on the Understanding What We've Grown to Be Deluxe Edition.

== Background ==
During an on-air interview with Jay Hudson of 89X Radio, Joshua Moore stated that they would begin recording their new album with producer John Feldmann in March 2013. According to guitarist Joshua Moore, the band entered the studio on March 13, 2013, and would record the new record for the next seven weeks. Vocalist Dave Stephens announced via Twitter that he would be singing more on this record than the band's previous releases; and also announced on April 23, 2013, that recording had wrapped up. On May 20, 2013, the band, Equal Vision Records and Outerloop Management revealed via online studio updates and social media networks album cover artwork, track listing, and that the band's third full-length album, entitled Tracing Back Roots is scheduled for a July 23, 2013 release.

== Videos ==
On Jan 31, 2013 the music video for the seventh track on the album, "Hope" was posted on the Equal Vision Records YouTube channel. On 20, December 2013 the music for the sixth track on the album, "Never Let Me Go" was posted on the Nuclear Blast Records YouTube channel.

== Cover ==
The album's cover painting was done by Paul Romano, who also created the cover of the first two albums.

== Track listing ==
No.	Title	Length
1.	"Tracing Back Roots"	3:39
2.	"Fade Away"	3:45
3.	"I Survive" (featuring Aaron Gillespie)	4:09
4.	"Ghosts"	3:27
5.	"Present, Future, and Past"	3:27
6.	"Never Let Me Go"	3:37
7.	"Hope"	4:08
8.	"Tell Me Now"	3:16
9.	"A Moment"	3:49
10.	"I Am Free"	3:33
11.	"Through the Darkest Dark and Brightest Bright"	3:44
Total length:		40:34

Target bonus tracks
No.	Title	Length
12.	"One Face"	3:11
13.	"Recklessness"	3:08
Total length:		46:53

== Charts ==
Chart (2011)	Peak position
US Billboard 200	8
US Independent Albums (Billboard)	1
US Top Hard Rock Albums (Billboard)	1
US Top Rock Albums (Billboard)	2

== Personnel ==
We Came as Romans

- Dave Stephens – lead vocals
- Kyle Pavone – clean vocals, keyboards, piano, synthesizer
- Joshua Moore – lead guitar, backing vocals
- Lou Cotton – rhythm guitar
- Andy Glass – bass guitar, backing vocals
- Eric Choi – drums

Additional personnel

- Aaron Gillespie – additional vocals on "I Survive"

Production

- Produced, mixed & recorded by John Feldmann
- Mastered by Joe Gastwirt
- Additional engineering & mixing by Tommy English
- Management by Mike Mowery and Matthew Stewart
- A&R by Daniel Sandshaw
- Art direction & artwork & design by Paul A. Romano
- Legal by Adam Mandell
- US Booking by JJ Cassiere
- Canada Booking by Adam Sylvester
- Asia / Australia Booking by Dave Shapiro
- Europe Booking by Marco Walzel
