= Dreams (EP) =

EP by We Came as Romans
- Released: December 2, 2008
- Genre: Metalcore, post-hardcore
- Length: 15:14
- Producer: Joey Sturgis

We Came as Romans chronology
| Demonstrations (2008) | Dreams (2008) | To Plant a Seed (2009) |

Dreams is the debut EP by American metalcore band We Came as Romans. It was produced by Joey Sturgis, and released on December 2, 2008. The songs "Dreams" and "Intentions" were later re-recorded for their 2009 full-length album To Plant a Seed. The album was celebrated 10 years later through an anniversary tour from Chicago to Michigan.

== Track listing ==
| No. | Title | Length |
|---|---|---|
| 1. | "Conditions" | 4:01 |
| 2. | "Dreams" | 4:15 |
| 3. | "Intentions" | 3:00 |
| 4. | "Shapes" | 3:52 |
| Total length: | | 15:14 |

== Personnel ==
We Came as Romans

- Dave Stephens – unclean vocals
- Kyle Pavone – clean vocals, keyboards, piano, synthesizer
- Joshua Moore – lead guitar, backing vocals
- Lou Cotton – rhythm guitar
- Andy Glass – bass guitar, backing vocals
- Eric Choi – drums

Production

- Produced, engineered, mixed and mastered by Joey Sturgis
