= Understanding What We've Grown to Be =

Studio album by We Came as Romans
- Released: September 13, 2011
- Recorded: February 16–March 10; May 16–June 23, 2011
- Studio: The Foundation Recording Studios, Connersville, Indiana
- Genre: Metalcore; post-hardcore
- Length: 47:43
- Label: Equal Vision (North America); Nuclear Blast (Europe); We Are Unified (Australia)
- Producer: Joey Sturgis; John Feldmann; Machine

We Came as Romans chronology
To Plant a Seed (2009)	Understanding What We've Grown to Be (2011)	Tracing Back Roots (2013)

Professional ratings
Review scores
Source	Rating
AbsolutePunk	60%
AllMusic	3/5 stars
Alternative Press	3/5 stars
Alter the Press!	4/5 stars
Rockfreaks.net	7.5/10 stars
Under the Gun Review	9/10

Understanding What We've Grown to Be is the second studio album by American metalcore band We Came as Romans. It was released on September 13, 2011 through Equal Vision Records. It debuted and peaked at number 21 on the Billboard 200 the following week, as well as peaking at number 5, 7, and 10 on the Hard Rock, Independent, and Rock Album charts.

The album's first single, "Mis//Understanding", was available for streaming prior to the album's release, and was released for digital download on July 5, 2011 along with the title track "Understanding What We've Grown to Be".

On April 10, 2013, the album was reissued in a deluxe physical edition, featuring their three most recent singles "Hope", "The King of Silence", and "Let These Words Last Forever" as well as a DVD of tour footage, interviews and live performance segments.

== Background ==
Understanding What We've Grown to Be was recorded during two sessions, the first being from February 16 through March 10, 2011, and the second being from May 16 through June 23, 2011. On June 22, the first single "Mis//Understanding" surfaced through Equal Vision' official YouTube channel. A day later, the title track was also released for free listening. "Mis//Understanding" was released as an official single on iTunes on July 5, 2011, which included "Understanding What We've Grown To Be" as a bonus track. On July 14, 2011, the album's cover art was released via puzzle on the band's homepage. By August 2011, the record's production was completed and distribution began shortly. On August 22, 2011, the length of each song was announced.

== Musical style and lyrics ==
According to Equal Vision, "musically and lyrically, Understanding What We've Grown to Be holds a much darker tone than their previous release, To Plant a Seed. While still maintaining the band’s overall theme of positivity and brotherhood, the new material takes on a more straightforward approach to life’s struggles and the challenges of growing up."

The lyrics follow a sort of 'dark to light' theme as the album goes on. "We, as a band, discovered a lot of negativity in our lifestyle that we hadn't truly realized or noticed in the past and this CD is a lot about dealing with that and coping when things turn out the opposite of how you'd imagined they would."

== Videos ==
"Mis//Understanding" was officially released, exclusively by ArtistDirect.com as the album's first music video on November 11, 2011. It is the first of a three part series of music videos for songs off of this album. The videos were filmed in Brooklyn, NY in September, with director Travis Kopach. According to guitarist Joshua Moore, "We actually filmed three music videos. The story you see is actually part one of three. As time goes, we'll release another video and then follow it with the final video. You see this guy running through the woods. There are scenes of him covered in mud, dirt, and grime. He's even running from himself. That's all going on in his mind. He's running away from the darkness that he sees. He's trying to break away and break out from that. It goes along with the lyrics of the song—not understanding a lot of the things that happen and the negativity that seems mindless. There's no reason for it. Towards the end of the song, Dave [Stephens] says, 'Don't give up on me. Take comfort in me.' The song is ultimately about figuring out how to fix things within yourself and be happy. That's where it all starts. More or less, the video is the artistic way of expressing that."

== Cover ==
The album's cover painting was done by Paul Romano, who also created the cover of We Came as Romans' debut full-length album, To Plant a Seed and features the same faceless boy from before. Guitarist/lyricist Joshua Moore and bassist Andrew Glass worked together to come up with the visual concept for the cover and then collaborated with Romano to bring the powerful imagery to life. Moore explains that the idea for the piece was developed long before the album was even completed stating, "We knew going into everything what the direction of the CD was going to be, the whole concept behind it and how we wanted to be portrayed as a band."

== Track listing ==
All songs written by Joshua Moore and David Stephens.

No.	Title	Length
1.	"Mis//Understanding"	3:57
2.	"Everything as Planned"	3:39
3.	"What I Wished I Never Had"	4:01
4.	"Cast the First Stone"	3:35
5.	"The Way That We Have Been"	3:44
6.	"A War Inside"	5:21
7.	"Stay Inspired"	3:34
8.	"Just Keep Breathing"	4:00
9.	"Views That Never Cease, to Keep Me from Myself"	3:48
10.	"What My Heart Held"	4:06
11.	"I Can't Make Your Decisions for You"	3:43
12.	"Understanding What We've Grown to Be"	4:15
Total length:		47:43

European bonus track
No.	Title	Length
13.	"Roads That Don't End and Views That Never Cease" (live)	3:55
Total length:		51:38

Japan bonus track
No.	Title	Length
13.	"Intentions" (live)	3:06
Total length:		50:49

Deluxe edition
No.	Title	Length
1.	"Hope"	4:10
2.	"The King of Silence"	4:36
3.	"Let These Words Last Forever"	3:42
4.	"Mis//Understanding"	3:57
5.	"Everything as Planned"	3:39
6.	"What I Wished I Never Had"	4:01
7.	"Cast the First Stone"	3:35
8.	"The Way That We Have Been"	3:44
9.	"A War Inside"	5:21
10.	"Stay Inspired"	3:34
11.	"Just Keep Breathing"	4:00
12.	"Views That Never Cease, to Keep Me from Myself"	3:48
13.	"What My Heart Held"	4:06
14.	"I Can't Make Your Decisions for You"	3:43
15.	"Understanding What We've Grown to Be"	4:15
Total length:		59:46

== Personnel ==
We Came as Romans

- Dave Stephens – unclean vocals
- Kyle Pavone – clean vocals, keyboards, piano, synthesizer
- Joshua Moore – lead guitar, backing vocals
- Lou Cotton – rhythm guitar
- Andy Glass – bass guitar, backing vocals
- Eric Choi – drums

Additional personnel

- Josh Wells of Close to Home – additional vocals on tracks 1 and 12
- Programming and additional keyboards by Joey Sturgis

Production

- Produced, engineered, mixed and mastered by Joey Sturgis
- Art concept by Joshua Moore and Andrew Glass
- Artwork and design by Paul Romano
- John Feldmann – production, mixing (deluxe edition)
- Machine – production (deluxe edition)
- Alberto de Icaza – engineering, editing (deluxe edition)
- Zakk Cervini – additional production, editing (deluxe edition)

== Charts ==
Chart performance for Understanding What We've Grown to Be
Chart (2011)	Peak position
US Billboard 200	10
US Top Hard Rock Albums (Billboard)	5
US Independent Albums (Billboard)	7
US Top Rock Albums (Billboard)	10
