= Zero 9:36 =

- Also known as: Zero (2010-2019)
- Born: Matthew Cullen; May 11, 1997 (age 29); Langhorne, Pennsylvania, U.S.
- Genres: Hip-hop; hard rock; alternative rock; heavy metal
- Years active: 2010–present
- Label: Atco
- Website: zero936.com

Zero 9:36 (born May 11, 1997) is an American rapper and rock musician from Langhorne, Pennsylvania.

== Biography ==
Cullen was born in Langhorne, Pennsylvania and began creating songs at age 11. He was initially inspired by hip-hop music before discovering rock and heavy metal, leading to Cullen adopting a fusion of the two genres.

As of 2024, he has released three full-length albums and the EP You Will Not Be Saved. He has collaborated with artists including Hollywood Undead, Travis Barker, Ice Nine Kills and Scarlxrd among others.

== Musical style and influences ==
Zero 9:36 cites Tory Lanez, Blackbear, and D-Pryde as key influences and has drawn comparisons to Eminem due to his "rapid-fire flow". He is also influenced by Slipknot (particularly vocalist Corey Taylor), Hollywood Undead, Lil Wayne, Meek Mill, Limp Bizkit, DMX, Kanye West, and Shinedown.

His musical style has been described as hip-hop infused with various styles of rock music including: alternative rock, heavy metal, hard rock, rap metal, rap rock, metalcore, and pop punk. His music incorporates elements of electronica and trap. (Note: Musical styles: hip-hop; alternative rock; heavy metal; hard rock; rap rock; rap metal; metalcore; pop punk; electronica; trap)

== Discography ==
=== Studio albums ===
- Barebones, Vol. 1 (2020)
- ...If You Don't Save Yourself (2021)
- None of Us Are Getting Out (2024)
- They Were Always Here (2025)

=== Extended plays ===
- You Will Not Be Saved (2019)

==== As lead artist ====
Title	Year	Peak chart positions			Album
Title	Year	US Airplay	US Main.	US Hard Rock	Album
"Adrenaline" (original or with Ice Nine Kills)	2020	13	3	6	...If You Don't Save Yourself
"I'm Not"	2022	—	21	—	Non-album singles
"Break" (with Atreyu)	2022	—	—	—	Non-album singles
"Chasing Shadows" (original or feat. Brandon Saller)	2024	—	20	—	None of Us Are Getting Out
"Here to Bleed"	2025	—	38	—	They Were Always Here
"—" denotes a release that did not chart.

==== As featured artist ====
Title	Year	Peak chart positions	Album
Title	Year	US Main.	Album
"Strangers" (Theory of a Deadman feat. Zero 9:36)	2020	20	Say Nothing
"Daggers" (We Came As Romans feat. Zero 9:36)	2021	—	Darkbloom
"Warrior" (Atreyu feat. Zero 9:36 and Travis Barker)	2022	—	Baptize
"Choke" (The Warning feat. Grandson and Zero 9:36)	2022	—	Non-album single
"Save Me" (Ekoh feat. Zero 9:36)	2024	—	Pressure

=== Music videos ===
List of music videos, showing year released and director(s) name
Year	Title	Album	Director(s)
2019	"Leave a Light On"	You Will Not Be Saved	Matthew Gold
2019	"WWYDF"	You Will Not Be Saved	Matthew Gold
2020	"Come Thru"		Matthew Gold
2020	"Breathing"	You Will Not Be Saved	Matthew Gold
2020	"The End" / "Undead"	...If You Don't Save Yourself	Matthew Gold
2020	"Adrenaline"	...If You Don't Save Yourself	Unknown
2022	"I'm Not"		Unknown
2024	"Underneath"	None of Us Are Getting Out	Cameron Burns
2024	"Nine Three Six"	None of Us Are Getting Out	Errick Easterday
2024	"Chasing Shadows"	None of Us Are Getting Out	Errick Easterday
2025	"Until the Day I"	They Were Always Here	Errick Easterday
2025	"Here to Bleed"	They Were Always Here	Errick Easterday
2025	"Withdrawals"	They Were Always Here	Errick Easterday
2025	"Holding On"	They Were Always Here	Errick Easterday
2025	"System"	They Were Always Here	Errick Easterday
2026	"Leave It All Behind"	They Were Always Here	Errick Easterday
