= Johnny Booth =

American metalcore band

- Origin: Long Island, New York/Oneonta, New York
- Genres: Metalcore; hardcore punk; mathcore
- Years active: 2008–present
- Labels: Booth Records, Hotfoot
- Members: Andrew Herman; Nick Martell; Scott Owens; Ryan Strong; Adam Halpern
- Past members: Adam Ingoglia; Steve DiModugno

Johnny Booth is an American metalcore band formed in 2008. The band consists of vocalist Andrew Herman, bassist Nick Martell, drummer Scott Owens and guitarists Ryan Strong and Adam Halpern.

== History ==
The band released their debut album, Connections, in 2012. In 2019, they released their second album, Firsthand Accounts. Their 2023 album Moments Elsewhere was met with positive reception.

== Discography ==
=== Albums ===
- Connections (2012)
- Firsthand Accounts (2019)
- Moments Elsewhere (2023)

=== EPs ===
- Sagua (2008)
- The Bronze Age (2014)
- Storyteller (2022)
