= Headwreck =

Australian metal band

- Origin: Brisbane, Queensland, Australia
- Genres: Metalcore; nu metalcore; alternative metal; electronicore
- Years active: 2019–present
- Label: Ditto Music
- Members: Connor Hickman; Jamo Benadie; Dayne Paix; Colby Horton

Headwreck are an Australian metalcore band consisting of vocalist Connor Hickman, guitarist and vocalist Jamo Benadie, drummer Colby Horton, and bassist Dayne Paix. They released their debut single "Freefall" in 2021.

In October 2025, they released the EP Attitude Adjustment which became their first release to enter the ARIA top 50.

== Career ==
=== 2019–2023: Career beginnings and early EPs ===
Headwreck formed circa 2019 and rose to prominence in 2021 with the release of debut single "Freefall" and released their debut EP Glamorise Demise the same year.

In April 2023, they released their second EP Reflection Room.

=== 2024–present: Attitude Adjustment ===
In August 2024, Headwreck released the single "Buzzsaw", which garnered over 100,000 streams in two months and earned television features on both Channel 7's AFL coverage and Rage.

== Musical style and influences ==
Headwrecks style combines elements of metal, hardcore, pop, hip hop, trap, EDM, industrial music and experimental music. More specifically, the band's musical style has been described as metalcore, nu metal, nu metalcore, alternative metal, rap metal, melodic hardcore, post-hardcore, industrial metal, electronicore and pop metal.

There musical influences include bands and artists such as Linkin Park, Alpha Wolf, Knocked Loose, Void of Vision, Movements, Press Club, Trophy Eyes, Slowly Slowly, The Amity Affliction, Parkway Drive, Dua Lipa, Make Them Suffer, The Chainsmokers, Doja Cat, Korn, Silent Planet, Odette, Tyler, the Creator, At The Drive-In, The Cure, Hot Water Music, Limp Bizkit, Fugazi, Thornhill, The Smith Street Band, Violent Soho, Joey Valence & Brae, Cypress Hill, Loathe, Northlane, She Cries Wolf, Stepson, Ocean Grove, Columbus, and soundtracks to Disney films such as Frozen and Moana

== Discography ==
=== Studio albums ===
List of studio albums, with selected details and peak chart positions
Title	Details	Peak chart positions
Title	Details	AUS
Attitude Adjustment	Released: 31 October 2025; Label: Ditto	43

=== Extended plays ===
List of EPs, with selected details and peak chart positions
Title	Details	Peak chart positions
Title	Details	AUS
Glamorise Demise	Released: 19 November 2021; Format: digital; Label: Headwreck	—
Refections Room	Released: 7 April 2023; Format: digital; Label: Headwreck	—
