= The Word Alive discography =

- Studio albums: 7
- EPs: 2
- Singles: 35
- Music videos: 17
- Other appearances: 1

The Word Alive is an American metalcore band from Phoenix, Arizona. The band was formed by vocalist Craig Mabbitt in 2008. After one unreleased EP, Mabbitt was replaced by current vocalist, Tyler Smith, the same year. They were signed to Fearless Records. In 2022, the band changed their label and are currently signed to Thriller Records. They have released seven studio albums and two extended plays.

== Albums ==
=== Studio albums ===
Title	Album details	Chart positions				
Title	Album details	US	US Hard Rock	US Indie	AUS	UK
Deceiver	Released: August 31, 2010; Label: Fearless; Formats: CD, music download	97	14	15	—	—
Life Cycles	Released: July 3, 2012; Label: Fearless; Formats: CD, music download	50	5	7	30	—
Real	Released: June 10, 2014; Label: Fearless; Formats: CD, vinyl, music download	33	4	7	11	28
Dark Matter	Released: March 18, 2016; Label: Fearless; Formats: CD, vinyl, music download	74	7	5	—	—
Violent Noise	Released: May 4, 2018; Label: Fearless; Formats: CD, vinyl, music download	79	25	2	—	—
Monomania	Released: February 21, 2020; Label: Fearless; Formats: CD, vinyl, music download	—	—	—	—	—
Hard Reset	Released: August 25, 2023; Label: Thriller; Formats: CD, vinyl, music download	—	—	—	—	—

== Extended plays ==
Title	Extended play details
The Word Alive	Released: November 3, 2008; Label: Self-released; Formats: CD, music download
Empire	Released: July 21, 2009; Label: Fearless; Formats: CD, music download

== Singles ==
List of singles as lead artist, showing year released and album name
Title	Year	Peak chart positions	Album
Title	Year	US Main.	Album
"Battle Royale"	2009	–	Empire
"Quit While You're Ahead"	2009	–	Empire
"The Only Rule Is That There Are No Rules"	2009	–	Empire
"Epiphany"	2010	–	Deceiver
"The Hounds of Anubis"	2010	–	Deceiver
"The Wretched" (featuring Dave Stephens of We Came as Romans)	2010	–	Deceiver
"2012" (featuring Levi Benton of Miss May I)	2011	–	Deceiver
"Apologician"	2011	–	Deceiver
"Lights and Stones"	2011	–	Deceiver
"Entirety"	2012	–	Life Cycles
"Life Cycles"	2012	–	Life Cycles
"Play the Victim"	2014	–	Real
"Broken Circuit"	2014	–	Real
"Never Forget"	2014	–	Real
"94th St."	2014	–	Real
"Light House"	2014	–	Real
"The Runaway"	2014	–	Real
"Trapped"	2016	–	Dark Matter
"Sellout"	2016	–	Dark Matter
"Made This Way"	2016	–	Dark Matter
"Overdose"	2016	–	Non-album single
"Misery"	2017	–	Non-album single
"Red Clouds"	2018	–	Violent Noise
"Why Am I Like This?"	2018	–	Violent Noise
"Burning Your World Down"	2019	–	Monomania
"Monomania"	2020	–	Monomania
"No Way Out"	2020	–	Monomania
"Searching for Glory"	2020	–	Monomania
"Pardon Me" (Incubus cover)	2020	–	Non-album single
"Wonderland"	2021	–	Non-album single
"Nocturnal Future"	2022	–	Hard Reset
"New Reality"	2023	37	Hard Reset
"Strange Love"	2023	–	Hard Reset
"Slow Burn"	2023	–	Hard Reset
"Hate Me" (featuring Julian Comeau of Loveless)	2023	–	Hard Reset
"Til My Fingers Bleed" (with Dino of SEVENTEEN & Duckwrth)	2025	–	Non-album single

=== As featured artist ===
Title	Year	Album
"Rise" (The Glitch Mob featuring Mako and The Word Alive)	2015	Non-album single
"I Can't Feel a Thing" (As It Is featuring The Word Alive)	2022	I Went to Hell and Back

== Music videos ==
Title	Year	Director	Album	Type	Link
"The Only Rule Is That There Are No Rules"	2009	Jerry Clubb	Empire	Live footage	
"2012" (featuring Levi Benton of Miss May I)	2011	Kevin McVey	Deceiver	Narrative	
"The Wretched" (featuring Dave Stephens of We Came as Romans)	2011	MOTIONarmy	Deceiver	Live footage	
"Entirety"	2012	MOTIONarmy	Life Cycles	Performance	
"Life Cycles"	2013	Frankie Nasso	Life Cycles	Performance	
"Light House"	2014	Max Moore	Real	Performance	
"The Runaway"	2014	Jeremy Tremp	Real	Narrative	
"Sellout"	2016	Marcus Eden	Dark Matter	Performance	
"Trapped"	2016	Marcus Eden	Dark Matter	Performance	
"Why Am I Like This?"	2018	Orie McGinness	Violent Noise	Performance	
"Human" (featuring Sincerely Collins)	2018	Orie McGinness	Violent Noise	Performance	
"Monomania"	2020	Orie McGinness	Monomania	Performance	
"No Way Out"	2020	Orie McGinness	Monomania	Narrative	
"Wonderland"	2021	Tyler Smith	Non-album single	Performance	
"Nocturnal Future"	2022	Jake Johnston	Hard Reset	Performance	
"New Reality"	2023	Jake Johnston	Hard Reset	Performance	
"Slow Burn"	2023	Jake Johnston	Hard Reset	Performance	
