= Live Love Die =

Live Love Die may refer to:

- "Live Love Die" (song), a song by In Fear and Faith from Your World on Fire
- Live Love Die (album), an album by Perpetual Groove
