= Too Close to Touch =

American rock band

- Origin: Lexington, Kentucky, U.S.
- Genres: Post-hardcore; pop rock; experimental rock; alternative rock
- Years active: 2013–2024
- Label: Epitaph
- Past members: Keaton Pierce; Thomas Kidd; Travis Moore; Mason Marble; Kenneth Downey

Too Close to Touch were an American rock band from Lexington, Kentucky, formed in 2013. They swiftly emerged onto the post-hardcore scene. Led by the frontman Keaton Pierce, the band garnered widespread acclaim for their adept musicianship and intricate arrangements, showcasing the technical prowess of each member.

Their debut EP, Too Close to Touch, and subsequent full-length album, Nerve Endings, released through Epitaph Records, propelled them into the spotlight, earning them a dedicated fanbase and receiving positive reviews from critics within the alternative music scene.

The band encountered a significant setback following the death of Pierce in 2022. However, in an effort to preserve Pierce's musical legacy, the band proceeded to release their final album titled For Keeps, on March 8, 2024, through Epitaph Records.

== History ==
=== Formation and Too Close to Touch (2012–2014) ===
Guitarist Mason Marble and drummer Kenny Downey began playing music together in 2008. In an interview with Highlight Magazine, Marble has described the story of the band's beginnings:

"Kenny and I have been playing together for about seven years now. We just started jamming out in his basement—Improv kind of stuff. Eventually we started getting into constructing songs, which was when we decided to look for people to start a band. We had a bunch of different people who would come and go, and Kenny and I would just carry on. Eventually we met Travis. We began playing with him consistently. Then, through mutual friends we got in contact with Keaton, who lived four hours away at the time... Then, Thomas actually sought us out. He was looking for bands in the area after just moving from Tucson, Az. to Kentucky, so we brought him up to Lexington one weekend to the studio to see what he had going on. Everything just sort of fit."

The band recorded their 4-track debut EP Too Close to Touch with producer Erik Ron in 2014 and announced their signing to Epitaph Records alongside its release. The eponymous EP was released digitally on October 21, 2014. Too Close to Touch supported Emarosa on their 2014 Versus album release tour.

=== Nerve Endings and Haven't Been Myself (2015–2017) ===
The band returned to the studio with Erik Ron to produce their full-length debut, Nerve Endings, which was released on March 24, 2015. Of the album, Pierce said, "It's an album with a message. It's an album that any instrument that you hear played, every vocal on the record is full of emotion and purpose. I guess it's just exciting showing the world our message. Not to sound cliché, but I want it to help people. It's a very brutally honest record. I opened up about a lot of stuff that I've never talked about before the album. I want to be able to change people like they changed me". The album was met with favourable reviews, earning a score of 72 on Metacritic.

Since the album's release, the band has toured extensively in support. In March 2015 they accompanied I Prevail on their The Heart vs Mind Tour with Chasing Safety. That summer, they supported I the Mighty on their Connector Tour with fellow opening acts Hail the Sun. In November 2015, the band supported Hands Like Houses on the North American leg of their Dissonants Tour.

The band released a new track "Heavy Hearts" for free download on February 12, 2016. Later that month, they embarked on tour with Secrets on their Everything That Got Us Here Tour.

On March 22, it was announced the band would be a part of the 2016 Vans Warped Tour on the Cyclops Stage with Against the Current, Ghost Town, and Chunk! No, Captain Chunk!. That same month, they were nominated for the Alternative Press Music Award for Best Underground Band, which the band would later win.

On July 18, the band announced their second album, Haven't Been Myself, which they had spent over a year creating. The album's lead single, "What I Wish I Could Forget" was released that same day, along with an accompanying music video. Haven't Been Myself was released on September 23, 2016, and debuted at #3 on the Billboard Alternative Artist Album chart, #9 for Top New Artist Albums, and #122 of Top 200 Current Albums.

On June 1, 2017, the band was announced to take part in Fearless Records compilation series Punk Goes Pop Vol. 7 with their cover of Martin Garrix and Bebe Rexha's hit song "In the Name of Love". The album and song were released via Fearless on July 14, 2017.

=== Singles series and I'm Hard to Love, But So Are You (2017–2020) ===
On September 19, 2017, the band released a new song titled "Leave You Lonely", the first in a series of three. On November 27, 2017, the band released the second song of the set, titled "Before I Cave In". On January 30, 2018, they completed the set of songs with the release of "Burn". About the 3-song series, the band said on their Facebook, "It explores the abrupt absence of someone you care about in life — be it romantic or otherwise. First comes the initial moment of clarity; realizing you're better off without them. Next comes the relapse; you can't get them out of your head, questioning if you ever had control in the first place. Lastly, finding yourself wanting nothing more than to rid your memories of what's left and leave it all behind. I'll leave you lonely before I cave in and watch us burn."

On April 17, 2018, the band released a statement confirming that they had parted ways with lead guitarist Thomas Kidd and bassist Travis Moore, citing personal reasons for their departure, and that the band would continue as a trio for the foreseeable future.

On January 18, 2019, they released a surprise EP titled I'm Hard to Love But So Are You, Vol 1.

On July 12, 2019, they released a surprise EP titled I'm Hard to Love But So Are You, Vol 2.

On November 12, 2019, they released a surprise EP titled I'm Hard To Love But So Are You, Vol 3.

On December 4, 2020, after a long period of inactivity, the band released another surprise EP titled I'm Hard to Love But So Are You, Vol 4.

=== Pierce's death and For Keeps (2022–2024) ===
On March 26, 2022, lead singer Keaton Pierce died at the age of 31 due to complications brought on by acute pancreatitis.

The two remaining members of the band, Mason Marble and Kenneth Downey, returned with the posthumous single "Hopeless" on September 6, 2023, in honor of Pierce after more than a year of inactivity since his death. "Hopeless" features one of Pierce's final songs recorded, with the band's friend Telle Smith of The Word Alive helping to complete the unfinished vocal performance.

On January 31, 2024, the band announced that their final album, For Keeps, will be released on March 8. Marble explained the decision to bring the project to an end, stating “Too Close To Touch would never have existed without Keaton and will not exist without him in the future”, and they hope to preserve his legacy with this posthumous release. The album features 8 songs, including "Hopeless", with Pierce's vocals sourced from a library of unreleased material. This announcement came alongside the release of lead single "Control".

== Artistry ==
The band develops their visual style in addition to their music. In developing their aesthetic, the band have taken cues from indie bands like The 1975, Walk the Moon, and The Neighbourhood. However, individuality is equally important to the band.

Marble has said of the band's sound and image, "From day one we always have been a band where we knew what we wanted to do. We've always written music that we wanted to write—never conforming to a specific genre. Not to say we don't have influences. We definitely do. It's just more meaningful for us to write without boundaries. We didn't have to conform to any sort of style. We write the music that makes us feel something."

Writing for AllMusic, James Christopher Monger described the band as, "a post hardcore quintet with a knack for infusing might with melody... offering up an explosive mix of indie rock, cool, and punk blasted emo pop energy in the vein of Sleeping with Sirens and The 1975. The band have honed their chops on the road with like-minded rockers Emarosa and A Lot Like Birds".

== Band members ==
Past Members

- Kenneth Downey – drums, percussion (2013–2024)
- Mason Marble – rhythm guitar (2013–2024), lead guitar, bass (2018–2024)
- Thomas Kidd – lead guitar (2013–2018)
- Travis Moore – bass (2013–2018)
- Keaton Pierce – lead vocals (2013–2022; died 2022)

Timeline

== Discography ==
Studio albums

- Nerve Endings (2015)
- Haven't Been Myself (2016)
- For Keeps (2024)

Extended plays

- Too Close to Touch (2014)
- I'm Hard to Love, But So Are You, Vol. 1 (2019)
- I'm Hard to Love, But So Are You, Vol. 2 (2019)
- I'm Hard to Love, But So Are You, Vol. 3 (2019)
- I'm Hard to Love, But So Are You, Vol. 4 (2020)

Singles

- Leave You Lonely (2017)
- Before I Cave In (2017)
- Burn (2018)

Compilation appearances

- Punk Goes Pop 7 – "In the Name of Love" (originally performed by Martin Garrix and Bebe Rexha)
- Songs That Saved My Life – "Let It Be" (originally performed by The Beatles)
