= Symphonies (EP) =

EP by In Fear and Faith
- Released: May 3, 2011
- Recorded: 2011
- Genre: Post-hardcore, symphonic rock
- Length: 25:37
- Label: Rise
- Producer: Nick Sampson

In Fear and Faith chronology
Imperial (2010)	Symphonies (2011)	In Fear and Faith (2012)

Symphonies is the second EP by American rock band In Fear and Faith. It consists of symphonic orchestral renditions of some of the group's best known songs with a guest vocalist included on nearly every track. It was released on May 3, 2011 through Rise Records.

== Background ==
The planning and idea for Symphonies began during 2011. Guest vocalists were confirmed to be included on most of the tracks shortly after the leak for "The Road to Hell Is Paved with Good Intentions" which features Craig Owens.

Due to unclean vocalist, Cody Anderson's departure from the band in 2010, Scott Barnes performs both vocal duties (singing and screaming) on the EP. This release is the first by the band not to employ dual vocalists (other than their demo) as they have been known to feature since their success.

== Track listing ==
No.	Title	Length
1.	"Novus Initium"	0:47
2.	"Bones" (featuring Nick Martin of Destroy Rebuild Until God Shows)	3:35
3.	"The High Life"	3:45
4.	"The Taste of Regret" (featuring Tyler Smith of The Word Alive)	6:14
5.	"The Solitary Life" (featuring Caleb Shomo of Attack Attack!)	3:04
6.	"The Road to Hell Is Paved with Good Intentions" (featuring Craig Owens of Destroy Rebuild Until God Shows)	3:29
7.	"Silence Is Screaming"	3:43
Total length:		25:37

== Personnel ==
In Fear and Faith

- Scott Barnes - lead vocals
- Mehdi Niroomand - percussion
- Ramin Niroomand - piano, keyboards

Additional Personnel

- Nick Martin (Destroy Rebuild Until God Shows) - vocals on "Bones"
- Tyler Smith (The Word Alive) - guest vocals on "The Taste of Regret"
- Caleb Shomo (Attack Attack!) - guest vocals on "The Solitary Life"
- Craig Owens (Destroy Rebuild Until God Shows) - guest vocals on "The Road to Hell Is Paved with Good Intentions"

Production

- Produced by Nick Sampson
