= Your World on Fire =

Studio album by In Fear and Faith
- Released: January 6, 2009
- Recorded: August 2008
- Studios: The Wade Studio, Ocala, Florida
- Genres: Post-hardcore, metalcore
- Length: 35:12
- Label: Rise
- Producer: Andrew Wade

In Fear and Faith chronology
Voyage (2007)	Your World on Fire (2009)	Imperial (2010)

Alternative cover

Professional ratings
Review scores
Source	Rating
AbsolutePunk	(72%)

Your World on Fire is the debut full-length album by American rock band In Fear and Faith. It was released January 6, 2009 through Rise Records.

== Background ==
On April 4, 2008, it was announced that the band had signed to independent label Rise Records. It was mentioned that the band would be recording their debut album later in the year with a planned release in November. The following month, the band went on tour with Burden of a Day, For Today and Life in Your Way. They then went on a West Coast tour in June 2008 supporting the Human Abstract. Your World on Fire was recorded in August with producer Andrew Wade at The Wade Studios.

== Release ==
Your World on Fire was released on January 6, 2009. It features re-recorded versions of the songs "The Taste of Regret" and "Live Love Die" (originally from the Voyage EP). The album as well marks the first release by the band to feature their current clean vocalist, Scott Barnes, as opposed to Tyler Smith who left the group one month after the release of Voyage. In January and February 2009, the band supported Gwen Stacy on their headlining US tour. In March, the band supported Stick to Your Guns on their headlining US tour. In May and June, the band went on tour with Sky Eats Airplane, Eyes Set to Kill and the Word Alive.

== Track listing ==
No.	Title	Length
1.	"Intro"	0:59
2.	"Pirates... The Sequel"	3:32
3.	"Your World on Fire"	3:44
4.	"The Taste of Regret"	4:50
5.	"The End"	3:04
6.	"The Road to Hell Is Paved with Good Intentions" (featuring Craig Owens)	3:30
7.	"You Already Know You're a Goner"	3:32
8.	"Live Love Die"	4:50
9.	"Strength in Numbers" (featuring Jeremy McKinnon)	3:32
10.	"Relapse Collapse"	3:44
Total length:		35:12

== Personnel ==
In Fear and Faith

- Cody "Duke" Anderson - unclean vocals
- Scott Barnes - clean vocals
- Ramin Niroomand - lead guitar, keyboards, piano
- Noah Slifka - rhythm guitar
- Tyler McElhaney - bass guitar, samples
- Mehdi Niroomand - drums

Additional musicians

- Craig Owens - additional vocals on "The Road to Hell Is Paved with Good Intentions"
- Jeremy McKinnon - additional vocals on "Strength in Numbers"

Production

- Produced by Andrew Wade
- Mastering, remastering, vocal engineering by Kris Crummett
