= The Death of Greeley Estates =

Studio album by Greeley Estates
- Released: August 9, 2011
- Genres: Metalcore; post-hardcore
- Length: 49:25
- Label: Tragic Hero
- Producer: Cory Spotts

Greeley Estates chronology
| No Rain, No Rainbow (2010) | The Death of Greeley Estates (2011) |

Professional ratings
Review scores
| Source | Rating |
|---|---|
| Rockfreaks.net | 7/10 stars |
| Under The Gun Review | 9/10 |

The Death of Greeley Estates is the fifth and final full-length album by Greeley Estates. It was released on August 9, 2011, through Tragic Hero Records.

== Sound ==
Before its release, Zimmerman explained the album's ideas to AMP magazine by saying, "We’re thinking of kind of combining the last two records, Go West and No Rain, to kind of bring back some singing and have a little bit of melody but still have the heavy. I’m not sure yet on the lyrical direction."

"I think it’s a new challenge. I think trying to do something that we didn’t do on the record before-we want to have a little bit of a shock value each time. The last two albums were a shock to people as far as what was coming from Greeley Estates. We started off some of early albums with pop songs so we’ve changed a lot over the years but we want to kind of have that same approach going into this record too. We just want to try and figure out what we can do to combine the things we know our fans love and what we love to perform but also do something a little different."

== Track listing ==
| No. | Title | Length |
|---|---|---|
| 1. | "Straitjacket" | 3:35 |
| 2. | "The Last Dance" | 3:15 |
| 3. | "Friendly Neighborhood Visit" | 2:45 |
| 4. | "Bodies" | 3:41 |
| 5. | "The Medic" | 3:35 |
| 6. | "Thousand Burning Forests" | 4:30 |
| 7. | "Broken (Interlude)" | 0:52 |
| 8. | "Leave the Light On" | 3:29 |
| 9. | "Circle the Wagons" (featuring Micah Kinard of Oh, Sleeper) | 3:47 |
| 10. | "The Reaction" | 2:54 |
| 11. | "Tonight" | 3:21 |
| 12. | "The Postman" | 4:46 |
| 13. | "Mouth to Mouth" | 3:19 |
| 14. | "Repaired (Interlude)" | 1:05 |
| 15. | "December" | 4:31 |
| Total length: | | 49:25 |

== Charts ==
| Charts | Peak position |
|---|---|
| U.S. Billboard 200 | 148 |
| U.S. Billboard Rock Albums | 38 |
| U.S. Billboard Heatseekers Albums | 2 |
| U.S. Billboard Independent Albums | 21 |
| U.S. Billboard Hard Rock Albums | 10 |

== Personnel ==
Greeley Estates

- Ryan Zimmerman – lead vocals
- Brandon Hackenson – guitars, programming
- David Ludlow – guitars
- Kyle Koelsch - bass guitar
- Chris Julian – drums

Production

- Produced by Cory Spotts
- Recorded by Blue Light Studio, Phoenix, Arizona
- Instrument production on "December" by George White
- Art, design/layout by Brian Trummel
