= Violent Noise =

Studio album by The Word Alive
- Released: May 4, 2018
- Genres: Metalcore; pop metal
- Length: 43:04
- Label: Fearless
- Producer: Matt Good

The Word Alive chronology
| Dark Matter (2016) | Violent Noise (2018) | Monomania (2020) |

Singles from Violent Noise
- 1. "Red Clouds" Released: March 30, 2018; 2. "Why Am I Like This?" Released: April 20, 2018

Violent Noise is the fifth studio album by American metalcore band The Word Alive. It was released on May 4, 2018, through Fearless Records. The album was produced by Matt Good and it is also the first album to feature Matt Horn as an official member, previously having played on the band's second album Life Cycles as a session member.

== Background and promotion ==
The album was revealed on March 29, 2018, with the lead single "Red Clouds". The second single, "Why Am I Like This?", was released alongside a music video on April 20.

It is their first album without bassist Daniel Shapiro and drummer Luke Holland since Life Cycles. Both members left the band before recording started.

Tyler Smith described the process behind the album in a 2018 interview: "I got really sick, my mental health was not in a great place whatsoever. I was just kind of going through the motions; I was drinking a lot, and I started doing drugs which had never been a part of my life before, but I was fighting it because I'm not that person... Violent Noise is about that internal struggle that I've been through that so many endure - that voice in your head that won't go away, that tells you this is right, or this is wrong. Mine was just kind of if you're going to have a devil or an angel on your shoulder, picture that, but I just had five devils on each shoulder basically. I just kept making bad decisions for myself, for my friends, my family, and so the record ended up discussing a lot of that."

The band further expanded on the meaning in a Reddit AMA, "Violent Noise as a whole is about all of the crazy shit that happens in your life, and how everything we do just gets filtered by our hearts and our minds. We have trouble truly processing so much of what happens and we end up just burying things to cope or move forward day to day. Eventually that can begin to eat away at a person, and it personally took its toll on me over the years, especially the last two. Everybody has things going on that are unspoken and if left unchecked it can creep up on you."

Asking Alexandria vocalist Danny Worsnop and rapper Sincerely Collins appeared as guest musicians on the album.

== Critical reception ==
Professional ratings
Review scores
| Source | Rating |
|---|---|
| Already Heard | 2.5/5 stars |
| Dead Press! | 8/10 stars |
| Distorted Sound | 7/10 stars |
| New Noise | 4.5/5 stars |

Violent Noise received generally positive reviews. Already Heard rated the album 2.5 out of 5 and said: "While there are short bursts of zeal on Violent Noise, there isn't much here to warrant anything more than a quick look at the handful of tracks that are above average. It is certainly not a record likely to define The Word Alive or shape their future work." Zach Redrup from Dead Press! rated the album positively calling it: "Plunging into territory they've been steadily dipping their toes in over the years, the next stage in The Word Alive's career could undoubtedly open a lot more doors, and ascend them onto new and wider plateaus. Evidently, you don't always need to be violent boys to create some violent noise." Distorted Sound stated that "The talent and creativity is clearly evident as sparks of brilliance are displayed throughout Violent Noise but the album becomes rather formulaic and predictable as it progresses. Some moments really grab your attention and THE WORD ALIVE are at their best when they up the tempo and throw a grenade piled with riffs in your direction. It is a shame that this effort doesn't quite achieve that sweet spot on too many occasions. The decision to wrap the album up in this fashion was quite a perplexing one as it kind of derailed the upbeat vibe that was boiling up throughout the album. If you love impassioned lyrics and memorable hooks Violent Noise just may be the answer you are looking for but it may not appeal enough to lovers of the heavier side of metalcore." Nicholas Senior from New Noise rated the album positively calling it: "Interestingly, the density of style and sound results in a record that requires a few spins to fully stick. It seems odd to call an almost sticky sweet pop-metalcore record a grower, but there's a lot more than what's at the surface, and it results in a fantastic reset for The Word Alive. Big, brash, and too much damn fun, Violent Noise reveals an engaging, delightful, and fantastic version 2.0 for the band."

== Track listing ==
| No. | Title | Length |
|---|---|---|
| 1. | "Red Clouds" | 3:53 |
| 2. | "Why Am I Like This?" | 3:13 |
| 3. | "Stare at the Sun" (featuring Danny Worsnop of Asking Alexandria) | 3:14 |
| 4. | "I Fucked Up" | 3:46 |
| 5. | "War Evermore" | 4:07 |
| 6. | "Human" (featuring Sincerely Collins) | 3:51 |
| 7. | "I Don't Mind" | 2:59 |
| 8. | "Real Life" | 3:23 |
| 9. | "Lost in the Dark" | 3:13 |
| 10. | "My Enemy" | 3:29 |
| 11. | "Run Away" | 4:19 |
| 12. | "Lonely" | 3:34 |
| Total length: | | 43:04 |

Japanese bonus tracks
| No. | Title | Length |
|---|---|---|
| 13. | "Misery" | 3:13 |
| 14. | "Overdose" | 3:42 |
| Total length: | | 49:59 |

== Personnel ==
Credits adapted from AllMusic.

The Word Alive

- Tyler Smith – lead vocals
- Tony Pizzuti – guitars, backing vocals, keyboards, programming, bass
- Zack Hansen – guitars, backing vocals, keyboards, programming, bass
- Matt Horn – drums, percussion

Additional musicians

- Danny Worsnop of Asking Alexandria – guest vocals on track 3
- Sincerely Collins – guest vocals on track 6

Additional personnel

- Matt Good – production, programming
- Ryan Daminson – engineering
- Taylor Larson – mastering
- Florian Mihr – album layout
- Rex Ron – cover art
- Vince Dwyer – photography
- Matt Anderson – management

== Charts ==
| Chart (2018) | Peak position |
|---|---|
| US Top Album Sales (Billboard) | 79 |
| US Heatseekers Albums (Billboard) | 2 |
| US Top Hard Rock Albums (Billboard) | 25 |
