= Far from the Lies =

Studio album by Greeley Estates
- Released: June 6, 2006
- Genre: Post-hardcore; emo; screamo
- Length: 46:17
- Label: Record Collection
- Producer: Lou Giordano

Greeley Estates chronology
Caveat Emptor EP (2005)	Far from the Lies (2006)	Go West Young Man, Let the Evil Go East (2008)

Professional ratings
Review scores
Source	Rating
Punk News	3/5 stars

Far from the Lies is the second full-length album by rock band Greeley Estates, released on June 6, 2006, through Record Collection.

The album is the last to feature Greeley Estates' emo/post-hardcore sound before the band moved to metalcore on the next album Go West Young Man, Let the Evil Go East. The sound on Far From the Lies was described as having "songs that float between choruses, using a dash of post-hardcore here, a pinch of screamo there, and a warm helping of some modern rock."

== Track listing ==
No.	Title	Length
1.	"The End of All We Know"	3:21
2.	"Too Much CSI"	3:58
3.	"Life Is a Garden"	3:45
4.	"Where Did You Go?"	4:09
5.	"Nothing Good Happens After Dark"	3:41
6.	"Remember"	3:43
7.	"Believe the Lies"	5:25
8.	"Are You Listening?"	4:45
9.	"Secret"	3:12
10.	"Through Waiting"	4:17
11.	"This Moment"	3:59
12.	"See Your Scars"	4:00
Total length:		46:17

== Personnel ==
Greeley Estates

- Ryan Zimmerman – vocals
- Brandon Hackenson – lead guitar
- Dallas Smith – guitar
- Josh Applebach – bass guitar
- Brian Champ – drums

Additional musicians

- Shelly Barnes – additional vocals on "Believe the Lies"
- Jordan Tappis – piano
- Sunny Davis – strings

Production

- Produced by Lou Giordano
- Engineered by Todd Parker
