= The Hounds of Anubis =

Single by The Word Alive

from the album Deceiver
- Released: July 26, 2010
- Recorded: April 2010
- Genre: Metalcore; electronicore; progressive metal
- Length: 4:13
- Label: Fearless
- Songwriter(s): Tyler Smith; Tony Pizzuti; Zack Hansen
- Producer(s): Andrew Wade

The Word Alive singles chronology
"Epiphany" (2010)	"The Hounds of Anubis" (2010)	"The Wretched" (2010)

"The Hounds of Anubis" is a song by American metalcore band The Word Alive. It was released as the second single from their debut studio album, Deceiver. The song is the opening track on the record and was written by the guitarists, Tony Pizzuti and Zack Hansen. The single premiered on the official Revolver website being met with positive reception prior to Deceiver's release.

== Background ==
"The Hounds of Anubis" was solely written by the two guitarists, Zack Hansen and Tony Pizzuti. The guitar solo for the song is performed by both Hansen and Pizzuti, who always alternate solos, and like "Battle Royale", it is played after the second verse and before the song's only breakdown.

== Composition ==
Vocalist, Tyler Smith described that the theme of the song is about "myself and the rest of the band trying to overcome all of our obstacles and with the help of our fans, rallying together to create something amazing. In the song I am represented by the king, in the verses I am talking to anyone who stands against my kingdom, while the choruses are about those who believe in the king. In essence, our fans and supporters who believe in us."

A remix of the song was handled by Limp Bizkit guitarist Wes Borland in 2011 and was released on the deluxe edition of Deceiver.

== Critical reception ==
Zach Redrup, writing for Deadpress, describes "The Hounds Of Anubis" as "one beast of an introduction" to the album, where "even the guitars don't take a backseat", which isn't common for contemporary metalcore. Redrup is also impressed by the keyboard/synth work, complementing the intensity.

== Track listing ==
No.	Title	Length
1.	"The Hounds of Anubis"	4:13

== Personnel ==
The Word Alive

- Tyler Smith – lead vocals
- Zack Hansen – guitars, backing vocals
- Tony Pizzuti – guitars, backing vocals
- Nick Urlacher – bass
- Dusty Riach – keyboards, programming
- Justin Salinas – drums, percussion

Additional personnel

- Andrew Wade – production, mastering, mixing
- Matt Martone – additional engineering
- Alan Douches – mastering
