= Voyage (In Fear and Faith EP) =

EP by In Fear and Faith
- Released: December 18, 2007
- Recorded: 2007, at Love Juice Labs, Riverside, California
- Genre: Metalcore, post-hardcore
- Length: 23:20
- Label: Self-released
- Producer: In Fear and Faith, Dave Swanson

In Fear and Faith chronology
In Fear and Faith (2006)	Voyage (2007)	Your World on Fire (2009)

Professional ratings
Review scores
Source	Rating
AbsolutePunk	(84%)
The-Pit.de	(10/10)

Voyage is the first EP by American metalcore band, In Fear and Faith. It was independently produced and released by the band themselves on December 18, 2007.

== Background information ==
Voyage is the only release by In Fear and Faith to feature vocalist, Tyler Smith before his departure from the group within the following year. 2008 also marks the year that the band were signed to Rise Records after their attention caught onto Voyage. Its rhythmical melodies and harsh parts impressed the label. The two songs "Live Love Die" and "The Taste of Regret" were re-recorded for their debut full-length, Your World on Fire, which was released in 2009.

Voyage was released on a rare independent Compact Disc pressing housed in a cardboard sleeve, which was mostly sold at shows. However, it was more commonly (and more widely) distributed on iTunes where it received over 30,000 song purchases by the end of 2008.

== Track listing ==
No.	Title	Length
1.	"Pack Your Bags, We Leave at Dawn"	2:41
2.	"There Be Pirates Among These Seas"	2:23
3.	"The Taste of Regret"	4:31
4.	"Corsair"	1:21
5.	"No Chance (of Walking Away without a Scratch)"	4:35
6.	"Silence Is Screaming"	3:07
7.	"Live Love Die"	4:46
Total length:		23:20

== Personnel ==
In Fear and Faith

- Cody Anderson - screamed vocals
- Tyler Smith - clean vocals
- Ramin Niroomand - guitar, piano
- Noah Slifka - guitar
- Tyler McElhaney - bass guitar, electronics
- Michael Guy - keyboards
- Mehdi Niroomand - drums

Production/other staff

- Produced by In Fear and Faith
- Mixed and mastered by Dave Swanson
- Engineered by Micky
- Additional personnel by Geoff Rockwell
- Additional lyrics by Jarred DeArmas
