= No Rain, No Rainbow =

Studio album by Greeley Estates
- Released: January 26, 2010
- Genres: Metalcore, screamo
- Length: 37:20
- Label: Tragic Hero
- Producer: Cory Spotts

Greeley Estates chronology
Go West Young Man, Let the Evil Go East (2008)	No Rain, No Rainbow (2010)	The Death of Greeley Estates (2011)

No Rain, No Rainbow is the fourth studio album by the American metalcore band, Greeley Estates. It is their last release with the guitarist Alex Torres. Its only single was "Loyal.com". The album is Greeley Estates' heaviest release, with many songs having fast tempos and blast beats, and with some songs completely absent of clean vocals. It also marks the band's debut in Japan.

== Track listing ==
No.	Title	Length
1.	"Seven Hours" (featuring Michelle Zimmerman, Kari Trummel and Amy Cooper)	3:46
2.	"I Shot the Maid" (featuring Cameron Martin of The Irish Front, Craig Mabbitt of Escape the Fate and Jared Warth of Blessthefall)	3:22
3.	"Loyal.com"	3:05
4.	"Friends Are Friends for Never" (featuring Cameron Martin of the Irish Front)	3:33
5.	"The Offer"	3:16
6.	"Jealousy Breeds Killing Sprees" (featuring Craig Mabbitt of Escape the Fate)	3:17
7.	"Swim For Your Lives" (featuring Jared Warth of Blessthefall)	2:53
8.	"They Won't Stay Dead"	4:13
9.	"Lying Through Your Teeth Doesn't Count as Flossing" (featuring Beau Bokan of Blessthefall)	3:17
10.	"Wolves Make Great Actors"	3:42
11.	"4,5,6"	0:55
12.	"You'll Never Leave Vegas Alive"	3:47
Total length:		37:20

== Personnel ==
Greeley Estates

- Ryan Zimmerman – lead vocals
- Brandon Hackenson – lead guitars, programming
- Alex Torres – guitars
- David Ludlow – bass guitar
- Chris Julian – drums

Guest vocalists

- Michelle Zimmerman, Kari Trummel, Amy Cooper - track 1
- Cameron Martin - tracks 2, 4, and 12
- Craig Mabbitt - tracks 2 and 6
- Jared Warth - tracks 2 and 7
- Beau Bokan - track 9

Additional personnel

- All music written and arranged by Greeley Estates
- Greeley Estates Music LLC (BMI)/Tragic Hero Records
- Recorded, programmed, engineered, mixed and mastered by Cory Spotts
- Produced by Cory Spotts and Greeley Estates
- Additional programming and engineering by Brandon Hackenson and David Ludlow
- Recorded at Bluelight Audio, Phoenix, Arizona
- Drum tech: Marty Welker
- Booking: Matt Pike (The Kenmore Agency)
- Legal representation: Lisa Socransky
- A&R: Tommy LaCombe
- Illustrations: Ryan Peterson (Fallencircus.com)
- Design/layout: Brian Trummel (TheBlackRhinos.com)
