= Imperial (In Fear and Faith album) =

Studio album by In Fear and Faith
- Released: June 15, 2010
- Recorded: Spring 2010
- Studio: Salad Days Studio, Baltimore, Maryland
- Genre: Metalcore, post-hardcore
- Length: 43:21
- Label: Rise
- Producer: Brian McTernan

In Fear and Faith chronology
Your World on Fire (2009)	Imperial (2010)	Symphonies (2011)

Professional ratings
Review scores
Source	Rating
Alternative Press	3/5 stars
Review Rinse Repeat	2.5/5 stars

Imperial is the second album by In Fear and Faith. It was released June 15, 2010 through Rise Records and is the band's last release to feature vocalist Cody Anderson. Between late June and early August, the band performed on the 2010 Vans Warped Tour.

== Background ==
Writing for Imperial began during the start of 2010 and its recording took place that spring. Brian McTernan was chosen as the producer for the album during its pre-stages. The group also called-in Lee Duck (of Sky Eats Airplane) for assistance with programing and electronic musicianship.

== Track listing ==
No.	Title	Length
1.	"The Solitary Life"	3:33
2.	"Bones"	3:35
3.	"I Know You Know"	4:39
4.	"Bought the Ticket, Took the Ride"	3:39
5.	"Pursuit"	4:52
6.	"Once Is Enough"	2:54
7.	"Counselor"	3:22
8.	"Heavy Lies the Crown"	3:17
9.	"Let It Out"	3:23
10.	"Eleventwentyfour"	0:45
11.	"Afterthought"	3:31
12.	"The High Life"	3:02
13.	"Live Love Redeux"	2:56
Total length:		43:21

== Personnel ==
In Fear and Faith

- Cody "Duke" Anderson - unclean vocals
- Scott Barnes - clean vocals
- Ramin Niroomand - lead guitar, keyboards, piano
- Noah Slifka - rhythm guitar
- Tyler McElhaney - bass guitar, samples
- Mehdi Niroomand - drums

Additional musicians

- Lee Duck - synths, programming, electronics

Production

- Produced by Brian McTernan
- Mastered by Kris Crummett
