= Go West Young Man, Let the Evil Go East =

Studio album by Greeley Estates
- Released: May 6, 2008
- Genres: Metalcore, post-hardcore
- Length: 48:04
- Label: Science
- Producer: Cory Spotts

Greeley Estates chronology
Far from the Lies (2006)	Go West Young Man, Let the Evil Go East (2008)	No Rain, No Rainbow (2010)

Professional ratings
Review scores
Source	Rating
AbsolutePunk	(83%)
Alternative Press	2.5/5 stars
Altsounds.com	7/10 stars
Asice	4/5 stars

Go West Young Man, Let the Evil Go East is the third album by the American metalcore band Greeley Estates, released on May 4, 2008. A music video was released for opening track "Blue Morning".

The album is the first by Greeley Estates to pursue more of the heavier metalcore musical style, compared to their earlier post-hardcore albums.

== Track listing ==
All tracks are written by Ryan Zimmerman and Brandon Hackenson, except where noted.

No.	Title	Writer(s)	Length
1.	"Blue Morning"		4:18
2.	"Go West Young Man..."		3:56
3.	"If We're Going Out, Let's Go Out in Style"		4:07
4.	"Desperate Times Call for Desperate Housewives" (featuring Dennis Lee of Alesana)		3:07
5.	"If She Only Knew" (featuring Dan Parker of A Change of Pace)		4:50
6.	"If I Could Be Frank, You're Ugly!"	Alex Torres, Zimmerman, Hackenson	2:49
7.	"In the Ashes"		3:19
8.	"Mother Nature Is a Terrorist" (featuring Joe Cotella)		3:43
9.	"Let the Evil Go East" (featuring Cameron Martin of The Irish Front)		3:23
10.	"I'll Have to Warn You, This Won't Be Quick"	Zimmerman, Torres, Hackenson	4:17
11.	"There's Something Wrong with the World Today"		3:15
12.	"Keep the Heat on the Dash" (featuring Graham Orthmann and Aaron Harris)		4:06
13.	"You're Just Somebody I Used to Know"	Zimmerman, Torres	4:54
Total length:			48:04

B-Sides
No.	Title	Length
14.	"Open Your Eyes"	3:35
15.	"A Day to Be Remembered"	3:17

== Personnel ==
Greeley Estates

- Ryan Zimmerman – unclean vocals
- Alex Torres – lead guitar
- Brandon Hackenson – rhythm guitar, backing vocals
- Brian "B-Champ" Champ – drums, percussion

Additional musicians

- Tyler Smith - bass guitar, clean vocals (on tracks 2, 5, 6, 8, 10, 11, 12 and 13)
- Joshua "Fergz" Ferguson - clean vocals, bass guitar (on tracks 1, 3, 4, 7 and 9)
- Cameron Martin (of The Irish Front) - vocals (on tracks 1, 4, 9 and 13)
- Dan Parker - vocals (on tracks 1, 5 and 12)
- Joe Cotella (of The Cover Up) - vocals (on track 8 and 12)
- Graham Orthmann (of Emerald Honor) - vocals (on tracks 1, 4 and 12)
- Aaron Harris (of Emerald Honor) - vocals (on tracks 1, 4 and 12)
- Amy Cooper - vocals (on tracks 3, 5 and 11)

Additional personnel

- All music written and arranged by Greeley Estates
- Greeley Estates Music LLC (BMI)/Science Records
- Recorded, programmed, engineered and mixed by Cory Spotts
- Produced by Cory Spotts and Greeley Estates
- Additional programming and engineering by David Ludlow
- Recorded at Bluelight Audio, Phoenix, Arizona
- Mastered by U.E. Nastasi at Sterling Sound
- Drum tech: Marty Welker
- Management: Stewart and Judi Teggart (Tightenitup Entertainment)
- Legal representative: Lisa Socransky
- A&R: Paul Gomez, Ryan Whalley, and Stewart Teggart
- Art direction/layout: Corey Meyers
- Photos by Joey Lawrence
- Characters by Oliver Polanski
