= Greeley Estates =

American metalcore band

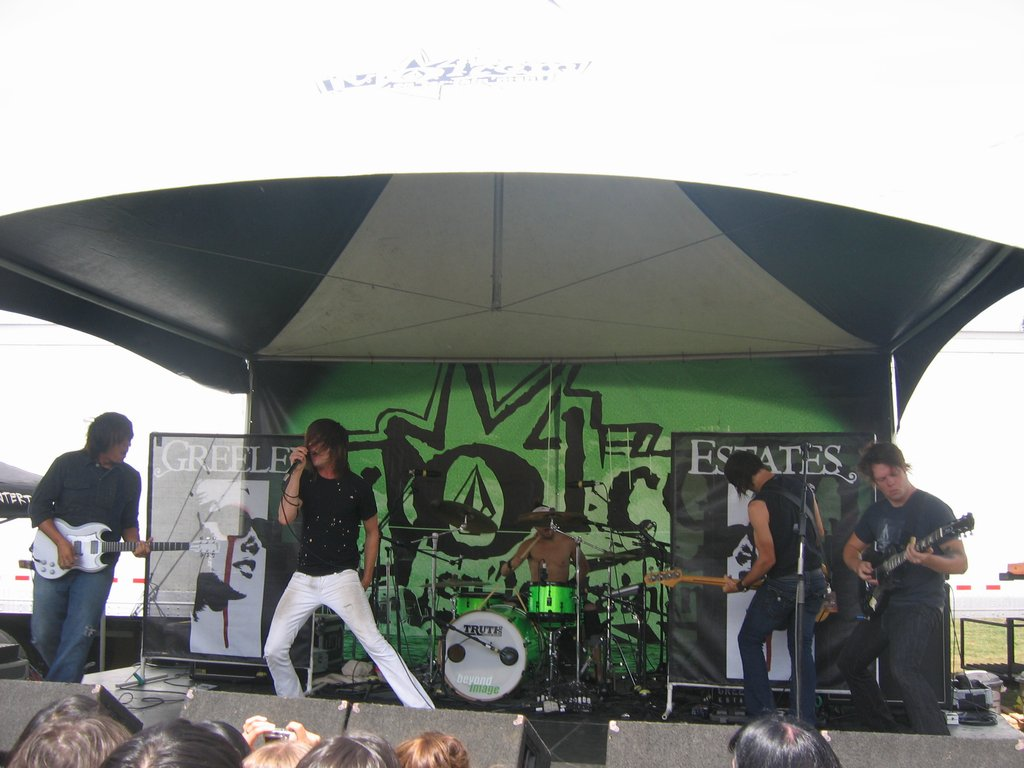
- Performing in 2006 at Warped Tour in Vancouver, British Columbia, Canada.

Background information
- Origin: Maricopa County, Arizona, U.S.
- Genres: Metalcore (later); post-hardcore; screamo; emo (early)
- Years active: 2002–2018; 2025–present
- Labels: Record Collection, Science, Tragic Hero, Ferret
- Members: Ryan Zimmerman; Brandon Hackenson; Alex Torres; Tyler Smith; Chris Julian
- Past members: See below

Greeley Estates is an American metalcore band from Maricopa County, Arizona. Formed in 2002, the band released five full-length studio albums and four EPs. The group initially had an emo-influenced post-hardcore sound, but later shifted to the metalcore genre with their third studio album Go West Young Man, Let the Evil Go East (2008).

Greeley Estates signed to Tragic Hero Records and Ferret Music in 2009 and released their fourth full-length album No Rain, No Rainbow in 2010, which features an even heavier sound. The band released their fifth and most recent full-length The Death of Greeley Estates on August 9, 2011 (not to be confused with their 2005 DVD of the same name), to which its sound was cited by vocalist Ryan Zimmerman as a hybrid between their previous two albums. Greeley Estates has gone through numerous line-up changes since its formation, with Zimmerman being the only remaining founding member after Hackenson's departure in 2014.

The band announced their final show and breakup via social media on 3 December 2018.

== Biography ==
=== Formation and early years (2002–2005) ===
Greeley Estates was formed by Ryan Zimmerman, Brandon Hackenson, Dallas Smith, Jared Wallace and Mike Coburn. The band name is derived from a sign in Greeley, Colorado that read "Greeley Estates" that Zimmerman and Hackenson saw on the way from Chicago to Phoenix. Mike Coburn left the band shortly before they started touring at the end of 2003. After a few substitute drummers, Brian Champ soon became the main drummer for Greeley Estates. They went through a few bass players who all left before they began touring the US. Jared Wallace was then replaced by Josh Applebach. They released their debut album Outside of This in 2004, a music video produced for its title track accompanied it. In 2005, Greeley Estates signed to Record Collection and released their follow-up material; the Caveat Emptor EP.

That same year, Greeley Estates had become one of PureVolume’s top 10 unsigned artists with over a million plays—an accolade supported by having album sales in the top 10 on Smartpunk since October 2004. Their distribution record further secured them a position on the Smartpunk chart for "Sales of All Time". They played every date of the Vans Warped Tour in 2005. Also, Greeley Estates co-headlined the MySpace Fall Tour 2005. Other accomplishments at this point included extensive touring, a DVD entitled The Death of Greeley Estates released in May 2005, playing on the Taste of Chaos tour and continual play on KEDJ 103.9 alternative rock radio in Phoenix.

=== Far from the Lies (2006–2007) ===
In mid-2006, Greeley Estates recorded their second full-length album Far from the Lies and released it later in the year.

On January 31, 2007, bassist Josh Applebach announced that he would leave Greeley Estates for a teaching career in Arizona. Bradley Murray (previously with Versus the Mirror) from Tucson, Arizona became their touring bassist. His first live appearance with the band was on February 3, 2007 in Safford, Arizona.

On June 3, 2007, guitarist Dallas Smith announced that he would be leaving the band in order to start up a family and announced that his last show would be June 20, 2007 at the Clubhouse in Tempe, Arizona. After their Mexican tour with Silverstein, Brad Murray left the band for personal reasons.

=== Go West Young Man, Let the Evil Go East (2007–2008) ===
On September 4, 2007, Greeley Estates recorded their new album. The two new members of Greeley Estates include Alex Torres (previously with Eyes Set to Kill) and Joshua Ferguson (previously with Glory Nights) During the recording of the band's third full-length album, Go West Young Man, Let The Evil Go East, Joshua Ferguson left to complete his apprenticeship as a hair stylist in Calgary, Alberta, Canada; personal reasons seem to be why he left.

Greeley Estates had announced Tyler Smith as their new bassist, who was formerly of In Fear and Faith. Smith played his first show with the band on February 9, 2008, at the Clubhouse in Tempe, Arizona, Smith as well played on Go West Young Man, Let the Evil Go East on all tracks where Ferguson did not. In the same year, Greeley Estates had a track, entitled "Let The Evil Go East", on the Warped Tour 2008 compilation.

Go West Young Man, Let The Evil Go East was released May 6, 2008. For the track "Blue Morning" on this album, Greeley Estates hired music video director Daniel Chesnut to create a "high energy, intense video" to match the band's new persona and differed sound.

On November 14, 2008, Greeley Estates announced that Smith, found within the course of the same year, had left the band to join The Word Alive.

=== No Rain, No Rainbow (2009–2010) ===
A song from the fourth album, entitled "Seven Hours" along with "Jealousy Breeds Killing Sprees", which features guest vocals Craig Mabbitt from Escape the Fate, were streamed online during November 2009. Another new song from album No Rain, No Rainbow entitled "Friends Are Friends for Never" was also streamed online.

On June 12, 2010, guitarist Alex Torres announced his departure from the band via MySpace. In the blog, he stated; "Im not exactly sure how to say this, but as of a month ago, I let the guys know that I would be leaving the band.. and the "Oh, Sleeper" tour would be my last tour in Greeley Estates... To clear things up early, NO there is NO bad blood, and everyone is on good terms. Greeley has been my family since 2007, and that will NOT change."

Greeley Estates has been touring around the world, headlining many of these tours with bands including Vanna, Tides of Man, A Bullet For Pretty Boy and The Crimson Armada.

Greeley Estates began work on their fifth studio album in 2010, originally expecting for an April or May release date.

=== The Death of Greeley Estates (2011) ===
When asked of the band's fifth full-length album before its release, Zimmerman told AMP, "We’re thinking of kind of combining the last two records, Go West and No Rain, to kind of bring back some singing and have a little bit of melody but still have the heavy. I’m not sure yet on the lyrical direction."

The fifth album was aimed for a summer release (which it met with an August release date), with producer Cory Spotts, who also produced the band's very first album Outside of This in 2004. The name of the album was revealed to be The Death of Greeley Estates.

On June 1, 2011 the first single to the new album was released on the band's Facebook page, titled "The Last Dance". On June 7, another song from the record was leaked, titled "Friendly Neighborhood Visit" through Alternative Press.

=== The Narrow Road/Devil Son (2012–2013) ===
Greeley Estates explained that the album they intend to release this fall will in fact come in two parts, each with seven songs: The Narrow Road, on November 20, 2012, and Devil Son, on April 9, 2013. They are releasing both albums entirely independently without a record label. They released a single, "Lot Lizards," from The Narrow Road on October 25. On October 30 they released another new song from The Narrow Road online for one day only called, "Die." On November 13, another new song from The Narrow Road was released entitled, "Head Underwater" which will be the first official single, and will see an upcoming music video. The music video for the song "Head Underwater" premiered on Alternative Press on February 12, 2013. The first song to appear from Devil Son was "Turn The Night Away" released on April 2, 2013. On April 5, 2013 the music video for the song "Marionette" premiered on YouTube.

=== Calling All the Hopeless and breakup (2016–2018) ===
On September 14, 2015 Greeley Estates posted "Working on new music!! We will keep you posted on the progress of the record." to the band's Facebook page, this was followed by a post on December 2, 2015 stating "New Greeley Record coming 2016!"

The band released a new EP entitled Calling All the Hopeless on 27 June 2017.

On 3 December 2018, the band announced it would be playing its final show later that month. On 21 December 2018 the band played its final show.

=== Reunion show ===
On July 14, 2025, the band announced a reunion show at The Van Buren in Phoenix, Arizona, on September 13 as part of Scary Kids Scaring Kids' Maps Written in Water album release show.

== Band members ==
Current

- Ryan Zimmerman – lead vocals (2002–2018, 2025–present)
- Brandon Hackenson – rhythm guitar, keyboards, backing vocals (2002–2015, 2025–present)
- Alex Torres – lead guitar (2007–2010, 2025–present)
- Tyler Smith – bass, clean vocals (2008, 2025–present)
- Chris Julian – drums (2009–2018, 2025–present)

Former

- Dallas Smith – guitar (2002–2007)
- David Ludlow – guitar (2010–2018), bass (2008–2010), keyboards, backing vocals (2008–2018)
- Jared Wallace – bass (2002–2004)
- Josh Applebach – bass (2004–2007)
- Bradley Murray – bass, backing vocals (2007)
- Joshua "Fergz" Ferguson – bass, vocals (2007)
- Kyle Koelsch – bass, backing vocals (2010–2018)
- David Hubbard – drums (2003–2004)
- Mike Coburn – drums (2002–2003)
- Brian Champ – drums (2004–2009)
- John Carpenter – drums (2001–2002)

Timeline

== Discography ==
Studio albums

- Outside of This (2004)
- Far from the Lies (2006)
- Go West Young Man, Let the Evil Go East (2008)
- No Rain, No Rainbow (2010)
- The Death of Greeley Estates (2011)

EPs

- Caveat Emptor (2005)
- The Narrow Road (2012)
- Devil Son (2013)
- Calling All the Hopeless (2017)

== Videography ==
Music videos

- "Through Waiting" (2005, from Outside of This)
- "Outside of This" (2005, from Outside of This)
- "Y'all With the Vampire Squad?" (2005, from Caveat Emptor)
- "Life Is a Garden" (2006, from Far from the Lies)
- "Secret" (2007, from Far from the Lies)
- "Blue Morning" (2008, from Go West Young Man, Let the Evil Go East)
- "Head Underwater" (2013, from The Narrow Road)
- "Marionette" (2013, from Devil Son)

Live music videos

- "Desperate Times Call for Desperate Housewives" (2008, from Go West Young Man, Let the Evil Go East)
- "Go West Young Man" (2008, from Go West Young Man, Let the Evil Go East)
- "If She Only Knew" (2008, from Go West Young Man, Let the Evil Go East)
- "Loyal.com" (2010, from No Rain, No Rainbow)
- "Seven Hours" (2010, from No Rain, No Rainbow)
- "Friends Are Friends for Never" (2011, from No Rain, No Rainbow)

DVDs

- The Death of Greeley Estates (2005)
