= Deceiver (The Word Alive album) =

Studio album by The Word Alive
- Released: August 31, 2010
- Recorded: April 2010
- Studio: Wade (Ocala, Florida); Leeway Music (Memphis, Tennessee)
- Genre: Metalcore
- Length: 41:56
- Label: Fearless
- Producer: Andrew Wade

The Word Alive chronology
Empire (2009)	Deceiver (2010)	Life Cycles (2012)

Singles from Deceiver
- 1. "The Hounds of Anubis" Released: July 24, 2010

Deceiver is the debut studio album by American metalcore band The Word Alive. It was released on August 31, 2010, through Fearless Records. The title derives from a passage of lyrics within the chorus of the song "The Wretched".

With anticipation of the album following up to their critically acclaimed EP Empire, the band promoted the album for several months until leading to its release. It was produced by Andrew Wade and is the first and only release by the band with drummer Justin Salinas, yet final with bassist Nicholas Urlacher and keyboardist, Dusty Riach. A deluxe edition of the record was released on June 7, 2011, and features bonus content consisting of four remixed tracks along with two previously unreleased songs and the music videos for the songs "2012" and "The Wretched".

== Background and promotion ==
With anticipation of their full-length debut album after releasing the EP, Empire during the previous year, The Word Alive began work on Deceiver after several US tours. It was recorded during April 2010 in Ocala, Florida with producer Andrew Wade. Guitarist, Zack Hansen explained that "The tracking was a lot of fun and everyone had a good time." Tyler Smith noted that he received a large amount of inspiration and knowledge from his friends in a small production studio in Newark Ohio. Crediting Nick Johns aka "Nicky Scene" for the content in a majority of the album "We wanted to step it up in every aspect of our songs compared to Empire. When we're heavy, it's heavier. When we do things big, they are huge! When we slow it down, it's something beautiful."

"Epiphany" was released as the album's first single where it was premiered online. The second single, "The Hounds of Anubis" premiered on the Revolver website. The album features a re-recording of the song "Battle Royale", originally featured as the opening track for Empire. The final track for Empire ("How to Build an Empire") is referenced in a line of lyrics found within the song "Consider It Mutual". Early copies of Deceiver have a typo on the backside of the included booklet which reads "Produced, engineered and by Andrew Wade".

A deluxe edition of Deceiver was released on June 7, 2011, and contains two previously unreleased tracks; "Apologician" and "Lights and Stones" along with the group's two cover songs; "Heartless" and "Over the Mountain". It also features remixes of the songs "The Hounds of Anubis", "The Wretched", and "2012", with "The Hounds of Anubis" being exclusively remixed by Limp Bizkit guitarist Wes Borland along with an unreleased music video for "The Wretched" as well as the "2012" music video. For the convenience of fans that were already in-possession of the hardcopy release of Deceiver, the release of the deluxe edition was only made digitally over iTunes. All extras included on the deluxe edition are available individually.

== Critical reception ==
Professional ratings
Review scores
Source	Rating
AbsolutePunk	(69%)
AllMusic	3/5 stars
Alternative Press	3.5/5 stars
Dead Press!	8/10 stars
KillYourStereo	75/100
Lambgoat	3/10 stars
SMN News	9/10 stars

Deceiver received generally positive reviews by many critics. AllMusic explained that the album "covers a lot of familiar territory. Where the album gets interesting is in the guitar acrobatics of Tony Pizzuti and Zack Hansen, who like to keep things lightning fast and intricate" and "for anyone looking for metalcore with a couple of surprises here and there, Deceiver should offer a little something new." Alternative Press stated "the relentless drive of so many of the songs found on Deceiver have an urgency and added aggression to them that would make many of their peers recoil out of fear." Zach Redrup from Dead Press! rated the album positively calling it: "Deceiver stands forward as a debut that in ways has in fact surpassed all expectations and hype built upon it, showing The Word Alive as a band who want to and should be heard. Watch your back Craig, Tyler 'Telle' Smith has put your old band into overdrive." KillYourStereo gave the album 75 out of 100 and said: "Deceiver lives up to its hype and is an impressive debut for The Word Alive, metal fans will find plenty here to both satisfy and surprise, keeping that good old metalcore spark alive for a little bit longer."

Nathan Lay of SMN News expressed that "this is one of those albums that actually becomes increasingly better as it plays through. It seems that most albums lose steam by the time they're half way through, but not Deceiver." Lay also garnered a comparison of the album to their Empire EP by stating "Hell, the EP is still a worthy metal contender with today's releases. So how [does] the full length compare? Well fans can stop holding their breath; Deceiver is beast. It's heavier, more intricate, more powerful, and even more aggressive (lyrically and musically)."

Negative reviews or comments of the album were generally made in dislike to the album's clean (melodic singing) vocals. Lambgoat referred to the singing as "Estrogen enhanced emo [vocals]" and gave it a negative review while stating "Just when you think they've sunk to the deepest depths of commercial mall-metal, the fast guitar flurries are re-re-remixed with stupid sounding synths."

== Commercial performance ==
Deceiver reached No. 97 on the Billboard 200, No. 37 on Rock Albums, No. 15 on Top Independent Albums, and No. 14 on Hard Rock Albums.

== Track listing ==
All music and lyrics written by The Word Alive, except where noted.

No.	Title	Music	Length
1.	"The Hounds of Anubis"	The Word Alive	4:13
2.	"Epiphany"	The Word Alive	4:02
3.	"The Wretched" (featuring Dave Stephens of We Came as Romans)	The Word Alive, Joshua Moore	4:05
4.	"Consider It Mutual"	The Word Alive	5:01
5.	"2012" (featuring Levi Benton of Miss May I)	The Word Alive, Tom Denney	3:01
6.	"Dream Catcher"	The Word Alive	3:24
7.	"Like Father Like Son"	The Word Alive	4:43
8.	"Battle Royale" (re-recorded version; original version from Empire)	The Word Alive, Tony Aguilera	3:56
9.	"You're All I See"	The Word Alive	3:50
10.	"We Know Who You Are"	The Word Alive	5:35
Total length:			41:56

Digital deluxe edition bonus tracks
No.	Title	Lyrics	Music	Length
11.	"Lights and Stones"	The Word Alive	The Word Alive	4:04
12.	"Apologician"	The Word Alive	The Word Alive	3:50
13.	"The Wretched" (KC Blitz remix)	The Word Alive	The Word Alive, Jon Courtney	4:35
14.	"2012" (KC Blitz remix)	The Word Alive	The Word Alive, Tom Denney, Jon Courtney	5:39
15.	"The Hounds of Anubis" (Wes Borland remix)	The Word Alive	The Word Alive, Wes Borland	4:03
16.	"Heartless" (Kanye West cover)	Kanye West	Kanye West, Ernest Wilson, Scott Mescudi, Malik Jones	4:01
17.	"Over the Mountain" (Ozzy Osbourne cover)	Ozzy Osbourne	Ozzy Osbourne, Randy Rhoads, Bob Daisley, Lee Kerslake	4:20
Total length:				72:28

== Personnel ==
The Word Alive

- Tyler Smith – lead vocals
- Zack Hansen – guitars, backing vocals
- Tony Pizzuti – guitars, backing vocals
- Nick Urlacher – bass
- Justin Salinas – drums
- Dusty Riach – keyboards, programming

Additional musicians

- Dave Stephens of We Came as Romans – additional vocals on track 3
- Levi Benton of Miss May I – additional vocals on track 5
- Tony Aguilera – composition, writing
- Tom Denney – composition, writing
- Joshua Moore of We Came as Romans – additional lyric writing for "The Wretched"

Production

- Andrew Wade – production, engineering
- Matt Martone – engineering
- Alan Douches – mastering
- Nate Matzelle – A&R
- Keith Koenig – art direction, layout
- Kyle Crawford – logo, title design
- Tim Harmon – photography

== Charts ==
Chart (2010)	Peak position
US Billboard 200	97
US Top Rock Albums (Billboard)	37
US Top Hard Rock Albums (Billboard)	14
US Independent Albums (Billboard)	15
