= Empire (EP) =

EP by The Word Alive
- Released: July 21, 2009
- Studio: Wade (Ocala, Florida)
- Genre: Metalcore
- Length: 23:00
- Label: Fearless
- Producer: Andrew Wade

The Word Alive chronology
The Word Alive (2008)	Empire (2009)	Deceiver (2010)

Professional ratings
Review scores
Source	Rating
AbsolutePunk	(81%)

Empire is the second EP by American metalcore band The Word Alive. It was released on July 21, 2009, through Fearless Records. The EP was produced by Andrew Wade and charted at No. 15 on Billboard's Heatseekers Albums chart. After this EP, founding drummer Tony Aguilera was fired from the band, it is however, the first release with lead vocalist Tyler Smith.

Smith, who mostly worked as a bass player or clean singer in other groups before joining the band, was pressured to learn how to properly scream in just a matter of few days in preparation for the EP's recording. Some additional screamed vocals are also provided by guitarist, Zack Hansen.

== Re-recordings ==
The song "Casanova Rodeo" was originally a part of the unreleased The Word Alive EP. After the release of Empire, the track "Battle Royale" became one of The Word Alive's most known and notable songs and was re-recorded for the band's debut full-length album, Deceiver.

== Track listing ==
No.	Title	Lyrics	Music	Length
1.	"Battle Royale"	Tyler Smith	The Word Alive	3:55
2.	"Quit While You're Ahead"	Smith	The Word Alive	3:44
3.	"Casanova Rodeo" (re-recorded version; original version from The Word Alive)	Craig Mabbitt	The Word Alive, Mabbitt	3:36
4.	"The Only Rule Is That There Are No Rules"	Smith	The Word Alive	3:52
5.	"Inviting Eyes"	Smith	The Word Alive	3:21
6.	"How to Build an Empire"	Smith	The Word Alive	4:31
Total length:				23:00

== Personnel ==
The Word Alive

- Tyler Smith – lead vocals
- Zack Hansen – guitars, backing vocals, additional vocals on "How to Build an Empire"
- Tony Pizzuti – guitars, backing vocals
- Nick Urlacher – bass
- Tony Aguilera – drums, percussion, photography
- Dusty Riach – keyboards, programming

Additional musicians

- Craig Mabbitt – additional writing on "Casanova Rodeo"

Production

- Andrew Wade – engineering, mastering, mixing, production

== Charts ==
Chart (2009)	Peak position
US Heatseekers Albums (Billboard)	15
