= Dark Matter (The Word Alive album) =

Studio album by The Word Alive
- Released: March 18, 2016
- Recorded: 2015
- Studio: Pulse (Los Angeles)
- Genre: Metalcore; alternative metal
- Length: 46:12
- Label: Fearless
- Producer: Matt Good; Scott Stevens

The Word Alive chronology
Real (2014)	Dark Matter (2016)	Violent Noise (2018)

Singles from Dark Matter
- 1. "Trapped" Released: January 8, 2016; 2. "Sellout" Released: February 19, 2016; 3. "Made This Way" Released: March 4, 2016

Dark Matter is the fourth studio album by American metalcore band The Word Alive. It was released on March 18, 2016, through Fearless Records and was produced by Matt Good and Scott Stevens. The album's lead single, "Trapped", was released on January 8. This is the final album to feature members Daniel Shapiro and Luke Holland.

== Critical reception ==
Professional ratings
Review scores
Source	Rating
Already Heard	4/5 stars
New Noise	4/5 stars
New Transcendence	9/10

The album received mostly positive reviews from critics. Already Heard rated the album 4 out of 5 and: "In reality though, Dark Matter marks a bold new chapter for The Word Alive, one where their 'pretender' tag is ditched in favour of something much more representative of this newfound greatness. Because for an album that sheds any much-maligned genre tropes in favour of a genuinely exciting, melodic sound, there can't have been many who'd have thought it'd be The Word Alive to pull it off." Kriston McConnell from New Noise rated the album positively calling it: "Dark Matter is the most mature record the band has released to date. Instead of focusing on breakdowns or screams the songs are more about the lyrical content. This is a direction the band has been heading in for some time, and this album is a culmination of that effort. It's slightly disappointing that the group has opted to deviate from the sound they created in Deceiver and Life Cycles, but Telle has been in the music industry since he was a teenager so a shift in sound is to be expected. If there are fans who were hoping they'd go back to their older sound, then they will be disappointed. The album is more similar to Real., and they will likely continue on that path for the rest of their career as a band." New Transcendence stated that "It's a difficult task to improve on a previous album, let alone do it three times in a row. But The Word Alive has managed to put out the best record of their career with the best metalcore album of 2016 so far. A triumph that'll be very hard to beat, the prowess on every song can't be overstated. So do yourself a favor and pick up this glorious album now."

== Track listing ==
All songs written by The Word Alive, except for "Face to Face" written by Scott Stevens, Tyler Smith, and Tony Pizzuti.

No.	Title	Length
1.	"Dreamer"	2:53
2.	"Trapped"	3:56
3.	"Face to Face"	3:23
4.	"Sellout"	3:34
5.	"Insane"	4:20
6.	"Made This Way"	4:15
7.	"Suffocating"	3:35
8.	"Piece of Me" (featuring Alicia Solombrino)	4:08
9.	"Branded"	3:57
10.	"Grunge"	4:00
11.	"Dark Matter"	4:07
12.	"Oxy"	4:00
Total length:		46:12

== Personnel ==
Credits adapted from AllMusic.

The Word Alive

- Tyler Smith – lead vocals
- Zack Hansen – guitars, backing vocals, keyboards, programming
- Tony Pizzuti – guitars, backing vocals, keyboards, programming
- Daniel Shapiro – bass, backing vocals
- Luke Holland – drums, percussion

Additional musicians

- Alicia Solombrino – guest vocals on "Piece of Me"

Additional personnel

- Matt Good – production, programming, post-production
- Scott "the Ninja" Stevens – production, mixing
- Chris Baseford – mixing
- Ryan Daminson – engineering
- Brad Blackwood – mastering
- Thomas Becker – vocal arrangement
- Ryan Williams – drum engineering
- Chris Foitle – A&R
- Sam Kaufman – creative direction, design, photography

== Charts ==
Chart (2016)	Peak position
US Billboard 200	74
US Top Rock Albums (Billboard)	7
US Top Alternative Albums (Billboard)	6
US Top Hard Rock Albums (Billboard)	4
US Top Album Sales (Billboard)	31
US Independent Albums (Billboard)	5
US Digital Albums (Billboard)	19
