= Monomania (The Word Alive album) =

Studio album by The Word Alive
- Released: February 21, 2020
- Studio: Grey Area Studios, Burbank, California, U.S.
- Genre: Post-hardcore
- Length: 44:34
- Label: Fearless
- Producer: Erik Ron; The Word Alive

The Word Alive chronology
Violent Noise (2018)	Monomania (2020)	Hard Reset (2023)

Singles from Monomania
- 1. "Burning Your World Down" Released: November 1, 2019; 2. "Monomania" Released: January 10, 2020; 3. "No Way Out" Released: January 24, 2020; 4. "Searching for Glory" Released: February 7, 2020

Monomania (stylized as MØNØMANIA) is the sixth studio album by American metalcore band The Word Alive. It was released on February 21, 2020, through Fearless Records. It was produced by the band themselves and Erik Ron. It is the last album to feature the band's drummer Matt Horn and founding guitarist Tony Pizzuti before they left the band in October 2021. It is also their last album to be released on this label before the band signed to Thriller Records in 2022.

== Background and promotion ==
On November 1, 2019, the band released the lead single from the album titled "Burning Your World Down". On January 10, 2020, the band released the second single and title track "Monomania" along with an accompanying music video. That same day, the band revealed the tracklist, album's official artwork and announced that their new upcoming sixth studio album Monomania is set for release on February 21, 2020. On January 24, the band released the third single of the album titled "No Way Out" and its corresponding music video. On February 7, two weeks before the album release, the band released the fourth single "Searching for Glory".

== Critical reception ==
Professional ratings
Review scores
Source	Rating
Dead Press!	4/10
Wall of Sound	9.5/10

The album received generally positive reviews from critics. Carlos Zelaya from Dead Press! rated the album negatively calling it: "The Word Alive mean well, and they've at least tried to expand their sound without it being a total car crash. But, unless you're already a fan of the band and their contemporaries, you're not going to get much out of this." Wall of Sound scored the album 9.5/10 and wrote: "MONOMANIA is a front running contender for Album Of The Year [...] Telle has really dug deep lyrically and bared his soul and there's just something about him showing that vulnerability that's easily relatable. The Word Alive have always stayed true to themselves and musically it definitely shows here, a lot of solid performances on this album from Zack, Tony & Matt!"

== Track listing ==
Monomania track listing
No.	Title	Length
1.	"Monomania"	3:58
2.	"No Way Out"	3:35
3.	"Searching for Glory"	3:36
4.	"Another Year in the Shadows"	3:33
5.	"Greatest Almost"	3:52
6.	"Thank You"	3:18
7.	"Numb Love (Misery II)"	3:52
8.	"K.F."	4:15
9.	"Burning Your World Down"	3:27
10.	"Comfort & Chaos"	3:48
11.	"I'm Sorry You're Sorry Now"	3:18
12.	"Death Is Only the End If You Assume the Story Is About You"	3:55
Total length:		44:34

Notes

- All track titles are stylized in all caps. For example, "Burning Your World Down" is stylized as "BURNING YOUR WORLD DOWN".
- "K.F." is initialism for "Kyle Forever". The song is dedicated to the passing of Kyle Pavone of We Came as Romans.

== Personnel ==
Credits adapted from AllMusic.

The Word Alive

- Tyler Smith – lead vocals, keyboards
- Tony Pizzuti – guitars, backing vocals, keyboards, programming, bass
- Zack Hansen – guitars, backing vocals, keyboards, programming, bass
- Matt Horn – drums, percussion

Additional personnel

- The Word Alive – production, composition
- Erik Ron – bass, production, engineering, mixing, composition
- Scott "the Ninja" Stevens – vocal production, composition
- Anthony Reeder – assisting engineering
- Ted Jensen – mastering
- Charles Kallaghan Massabo – programming, composition
- Ryan Daminson – programming, composition
- Richard Raun – package design
- Cameron Burns – artwork
