= Real (The Word Alive album) =

Studio album by The Word Alive
- Released: June 10, 2014
- Genre: Metalcore
- Length: 45:15
- Label: Fearless
- Producers: Cameron Mizell; John Feldmann

The Word Alive chronology
Life Cycles (2012)	Real (2014)	Dark Matter (2016)

Real (stylized as REAL.) is the third studio album by American metalcore band The Word Alive. It was released on June 10, 2014, through Fearless Records and was produced by Cameron Mizell and John Feldmann. It is the first album to feature drummer Luke Holland.

== Background and recording ==
Vocalist Tyler Smith discussed the sound of the album in an interview stating that the album would feature some of the heaviest songs they have ever written and some of the most melodic with no unclean vocals in some tracks. On December 20, 2013, the band released their first studio update for their forthcoming album with the first update detailing the sound of the guitars on the album.

== Critical reception ==
Professional ratings
Aggregate scores
Source	Rating
Metacritic	75/100
Review scores
Source	Rating
AllMusic	3.5/5 stars
Alternative Press	4/5 stars
Kerrang!	3/5 stars
KillYourStereo	59/100
Revolver	4/5 stars

Real received positive reviews from music critics. At Metacritic, which assigns a normalised rating out of 100 to reviews from mainstream critics, the album has an average score of 75 out of 100 based on 4 reviews, indicating "generally favorable reviews". AllMusic gave the album a positive review saying, "As more and more bands continue to experiment with the fusion of electronic music and metalcore, the Word Alive set themselves apart from the pack with a more nuanced view of how these two styles can complement one another, proving that things don't always need to be pushed to extremes to be interesting or exciting. Because of this, Real is a rare metalcore album with enough depth to demand repeat listening, which definitely won't disappoint the band's die-hard fans."

Brendan Manley of Alternative Press gave the album a 4 out of 5 stars, saying: "It takes serious swagger to be a modern metalcore/post-hardcore band who drop a record called REAL.—a musical shot across the collective bow of fellow contenders and also-rans alike—and Phoenix quintet the Word Alive back up the insinuation with a shock-and-awe barrage of blast beats, blazing guitars and perhaps most crucially, a formidable array of razor-sharp hooks." KillYourStereo gave the album 59 out of 100 and said: "There are elements in REAL. that are new and exciting within the world of The Word Alive, but that world is held down by the giant hand of the metalcore genre, which is starting to sound like more and more of the same with each new release."

== Track listing ==
Adapted from Spotify.

No.	Title	Length
1.	"Play the Victim"	4:19
2.	"Never Forget"	3:31
3.	"Broken Circuit"	3:54
4.	"Light House"	3:19
5.	"The Fortune Teller"	3:52
6.	"Glass Castle"	3:50
7.	"94th St."	3:46
8.	"Your Mirage"	3:59
9.	"Terminal"	4:01
10.	"The Runaway"	3:20
11.	"To Struggle and Claw My Way"	3:06
12.	"Collapsing"	4:18
Total length:		45:15

Japanese and iTunes bonus track
No.	Title	Length
13.	"Pull Us Out of the Grave"	2:47
Total length:		48:02

European bonus track
No.	Title	Length
13.	"Exit Strategy"	3:39
Total length:		48:54

== Personnel ==
Credits adapted from AllMusic.

The Word Alive

- Tyler Smith – lead vocals
- Zack Hansen – guitars, backing vocals, keyboards, programming
- Tony Pizzuti – guitars, backing vocals, keyboards, programming
- Daniel Shapiro – bass
- Luke Holland – drums

Additional personnel

- Cameron Mizell – production
- John Feldmann – production, composition
- Erik Ron – composition
- Dan Korneff – mixing
- Brad Blackwood – mastering
- Chris Foitle – A&R
- Sal Torres – A&R
- Sam Kaufman – artwork, design
- Jenny Reader – production management

== Charts ==
Chart (2014)	Peak position
US Billboard 200	33
US Top Rock Albums (Billboard)	12
US Top Hard Rock Albums (Billboard)	4
US Independent Albums (Billboard)	7
US Digital Albums (Billboard)	22
