= Hard Reset (album) =

Studio album by The Word Alive
- Released: August 25, 2023
- Genres: Alternative metal; melodic metalcore
- Length: 47:00
- Label: Thriller
- Producer: Hiram Hernandez

The Word Alive chronology
Monomania (2020)	Hard Reset (2023)

Singles from Hard Reset
- 1. "Nocturnal Future" Released: November 17, 2022; 2. "New Reality" Released: March 3, 2023; 3. "Strange Love" Released: May 19, 2023; 4. "Slow Burn" Released: June 22, 2023; 5. "Hate Me" Released: August 4, 2023

Hard Reset is the seventh studio album by American metalcore band The Word Alive. The album was released on August 25, 2023, through Thriller Records and was produced by Hiram Hernandez. It is the first release from the band under Thriller Records. This is the first album to feature guitarist Jose DelRio, the first and only album with drummer Daniel Nelson, and the last album with founding guitarist Zack Hansen, who left in 2024.

== Background and promotion ==
On November 16, 2022, The Word Alive released a video teaser for their new song "Nocturnal Future", available on November 17. On that day, the band officially unveiled the single and its corresponding music video. In addition, the band also announced that they had parted ways with Fearless Records and signed with Thriller Records.

On March 3, 2023, the band published the second single "New Reality" along with an accompanying music video. On May 19, the band premiered the third single "Strange Love". On June 22, the band released the fourth single "Slow Burn". At the same time, they officially announced the album itself and release date, whilst also revealing the album cover and the track list. On July 7, the music video for "Slow Burn" premiered on the band's YouTube channel. On August 4, three weeks before the album release, the band released the fifth and final single "Hate Me" featuring Julian Comeau of Loveless.

== Critical reception ==
Professional ratings
Review scores
Source	Rating
Distorted Sound	9/10
Kerrang!	4/5 stars
Wall of Sound	8/10

The album received generally positive reviews from critics. Izzy Sheldon from Distorted Sound rated the album positively calling it: "Overall, Hard Reset is a very cool album, knocking bouncy riffs and punchy vocals along every step of the way. The range of features on the album also add to this experimental feel throughout, but don't take away from the identity that The Word Alive has created for themselves. A super enjoyable listen." Kerrang! gave the album 4 out of 5 and stated: "Hard Reset is a beefy offering. Some tracks feel slightly weaker than others, but even still, there's no bad songs here either, just ones that don't feel quite as bold. As it navigates through existentialism and worrying futures, its overall sound comes across as far more defined than some of their older material. This record feels like the mark of a re-birth for The Word Alive." Wall of Sound scored the album 8/10 and wrote: "Making a statement after three and a half years away, Hard Reset leaves no doubts and a trail of destruction. Musically monumental and bursting with life, The Word Alive live up to their name like never before!"

== Track listing ==
Hard Reset track listing
No.	Title	Length
1.	"The Word Alive Is Dead..."	2:42
2.	"Hard Reset"	3:29
3.	"Strange Love"	3:58
4.	"One of Us" (featuring Noah Sebastian of Bad Omens)	3:43
5.	"New Reality"	2:56
6.	"Hate Me" (featuring Julian Comeau of Loveless)	3:41
7.	"Slow Burn"	3:43
8.	"Fade Away" (featuring Craig Mabbitt)	4:00
9.	"A New Empty" (featuring Philip Strand of Normandie)	3:26
10.	"Static Rain"	3:27
11.	"Invisible Army"	3:20
12.	"Nocturnal Future"	4:32
13.	"War with You" (featuring Matt Good)	4:03
Total length:		47:00

== Personnel ==
The Word Alive

- Tyler Smith – lead vocals
- Zack Hansen – guitars, backing vocals, keyboards, programming, bass
- Jose DelRio – guitars, backing vocals, keyboards, programming, bass
- Daniel Nelson – drums

Additional musicians

- Noah Sebastian of Bad Omens – guest vocals on track 4
- Julian Comeau of Loveless – guest vocals on track 6
- Craig Mabbitt of Escape the Fate – guest vocals on track 8
- Philip Strand of Normandie – guest vocals on track 9
- Matt Good of From First to Last – guest vocals on track 13

Additional personnel

- Hiram Hernandez – production, engineering, mixing
- Mike Kalajian – mastering
