= In Fear and Faith =

Metalcore band from California

- Sean Bell and Scott Barnes from in Fear and Faith performing in 2012

Background information
- Origin: San Diego, California, U.S.
- Genres: Post-hardcore, metalcore, alternative metal
- Years active: 2006–2017
- Label: Rise
- Members: Jarred DeArmas; Cody Anderson; Scott Barnes; Noah Slifka; Tyler McElhaney; Sean Bell; Chase Whitney
- Past members: Ramin Niroomand; Mehdi Niroomand; Franklin Tran; Tyler Smith; Davey Owens; Michael Guy
- Website: facebook.com/infaf

In Fear and Faith was an American post-hardcore band from San Diego, California. Formed in 2006, the group was signed to Rise Records and released three studio albums and two EPs. Their debut full-length, Your World on Fire, being released nearly a year after the band's signing to Rise in 2008, peaked at No. 193 on the Billboard 200. Their second full-length album, Imperial was released the following year and failed to make that chart, but did chart on the Top Heatseekers and overall Indie chart in the US. The band has undergone many line-up changes since its formation, and does not feature any consistent original members since the departure of guitarist Ramin Niroomand and drummer Mehdi Niroomand in 2014; vocalist Scott Barnes is the only current member of the band to have performed on all of the group's studio albums, though he is not an original member; likewise, although current bassist Tyler McElhany is a founding member of the band himself, he was out of the group from 2011 to 2014 and did not contribute to their third album, In Fear and Faith.

== History ==
=== Inception and Voyage (2006–2007) ===
In Fear and Faith was founded in 2006 by members Davey Owens, Mehdi Niroomand, Tyler McElhaney, Jarred DeArmas, Michael Guy and Ramin Niroomand while attending high school in San Diego and derived the band's name off of the Circa Survive song of the same name. The band recorded a self-titled demo during the same year formed, containing four tracks.

A year after recording the demo, founding vocalist Jarred DeArmas was kicked out of the group in desire of the members seeking a singer with a higher vocal range. Tyler Smith was, at this point, employed as the band's clean vocalist along with Cody Anderson as the band's unclean vocalist. A few months after these modifications, they replaced guitarist Davey Owens with Noah Slifka while keyboardist, Michael Guy left the band completely without a member in his replacement. With this line-up, they recorded their first EP, Voyage and released it via iTunes on December 17, 2007. Met with positive acclaim and achieving more than 30,000 song purchases, it attracted the attention of Rise Records, which they were signed to the following year.

=== Your World on Fire (2008–2009) ===
Clean vocalist Smith left the band in January 2008 to join Greeley Estates as bassist. He was replaced by Scott Barnes and the group released their debut album, Your World on Fire, on January 6, 2009, via Rise Records. It reached No. 193 on the Billboard 200. The album's success led In Fear and Faith to inclusions on many tours and festivals. They toured with groups such as Gwen Stacy, Our Last Night, Vanna, Emarosa, the Human Abstract, Life in Your Way, Burden of a Day, Lower Definition, Confide, VersaEmerge, Here I Come Falling, Broadway, In This Moment, Agraceful and Motionless in White.

=== Imperial, Symphonies and member changes (2010–2011) ===
On December 19, 2009, the band put an update on their Facebook profile stating that they were writing and recording a new album over those next three months. During mid-April, the band completed the record after touring Europe, its title was revealed as Imperial. On May 12 at Midnight (PST) the band released three new songs off of the album; "The Solitary Life", "Counselor", and "Bones" as streaming media online prior to its release. On June 15, 2010 Imperial was released worldwide.

In Fear and Faith appeared on the entire 2010 Vans Warped Tour performing on the Skullcandy Stage. Craig Owens, of Destroy Rebuild Until God Shows, performed guest vocals with the group on two of the tour dates. In Fear and Faith also participated in the Band of Brothers Tour in the fall of 2010 with We Came as Romans, Confide, Upon a Burning Body and Abandon All Ships.

While In Fear and Faith were included on Attack Attack!'s This Is a Family Tour, unclean vocalist, Cody Anderson was forced to not be included on their schedule for personal reasons and his position in the group was substituted by Bryan Zimmerman, formerly of Sky Eats Airplane. On December 5, 2010, it was then announced that Anderson left the band completely. The reason for his leaving was never explained. With a lighter line-up, the band then took some time off from touring and recorded an EP featuring symphonic renditions of some of their songs. The EP was titled Symphonies, and was released on May 3, 2011. Barnes performs both the clean and unclean vocals on the release. Before its surfacing, the band once more changed its line-up. Both Tyler McElhaney and Noah Slifka were replaced by Jarred DeArmas and Sean Bell, respectively. Bell served as a touring member during the This Is A Family Tour for the group in the rhythm guitar position before his joining and DeArmas was originally the band's vocalist during its founding in high school when he was 17 in 2006.

=== Self-titled album (2012) ===
The band teased announced their new album by releasing the lead single on November 8, 2011, for a song titled, "It All Comes Out (On the Way Down)". "A Creeping Dose" was released on June 29, 2012, three days into the "Scream It Like You Mean It 2012" tour. The album was released later that year on October 16, 2012, with Dave Stephens of We Came as Romans appeared as a vocalist on the track "The Calm Before Reform".

=== Return of some old members and new music (2013–present) ===
Ramin Niroomand informally announced that he and his brother are no longer members of In Fear and Faith. Their guitarist has released a statement via Instagram stating that they will release a statement on the future of the band "once legal matters subside." On May 7, 2014, the band posted a picture on their Facebook with a skull and two swords reading "06/07/14". According to posts on Facebook, Cody Anderson and Noah Slifka, are back in the band and announced via his profile picture that In Fear and Faith will perform the show as supporting band for Saosin along with Open Hand on Saturday, June 7, 2014, at Club Nokia, Los Angeles. Chase Whitney (End the Century, Two from Evil) was announced as their temporary drummer.

On June 5, 2014, the band announced that they would be recording new music issuing this statement: "weren't initially planning on it. but with the ridiculous amount of support we've received in the last few weeks, we have decided to make some new music. working out the details currently." However, on June 8, the band announced after opening for Saosin with original vocalist Anthony Green that this would be their final show, which was later denied on the band's official Facebook page with the comment ""Scott wasn't finished talking and the song started ha. We'll probably do some more shows. You'd think sites would reach out before reporting shit." As of February 14, 2015, In Fear and Faith has stated on their Facebook page they are currently working on new music. On May 14, 2015, Sean Bell posted a video on his Instagram stating that the band had officially started pre-production.

As of 2017, no further updates have been provided on the band. Members maintain that the band has not broken up, although lead vocalist Scott Barnes, and guitarist Sean Bell are in a new band, Noble. In spite of this, they state that new In Fear and Faith music will come eventually.

== Musical style ==
In Fear and Faith are essentially a post-hardcore band, but perform the genre with a tied-in influence of metal and electronica. The group is primarily influenced by alternative rock, emo, hardcore and heavy metal genres. Music journalist, Andrew Leahy documented In Fear and Faith's sound as "a blend of furious instrumentation, electronic flourishes and screamo vocals" along with mentioning embracement of heavy metal while complimenting their hybrid sound of being the case why the group "were signed so quickly" and "wasted little time" doing so.

In Fear and Faith songs are usually three minutes in length, but their longer and more-known songs such as "Live Love Die" and "The Taste of Regret" lead into four minutes of length. The main songwriters have primarily always been Ramin and Mehdi Nirromand, Tyler McElhaney and Scott Barnes. Bassist, McElhaney has commented on the band's guitar tunings stating that while the tunings on Your World on Fire and Voyage would be set to the same drop throughout, Imperial features different tunings on several different songs to add "depth" regardless of the difficulty of this for live performances.

== Band members ==
Final lineup

- Jarred DeArmas – lead vocals (2006–2007), backing vocals (2011–2017), bass (2011–2014), keyboards, piano (2013–2017)
- Tyler McElhaney – bass, backing vocals, samples (2006–2011, 2014–2017)
- Cody "Duke" Anderson – unclean vocals (2007–2010, 2014–2017)
- Noah Slifka – lead guitar (2014–2017), rhythm guitar (2007–2011)
- Scott Barnes – clean vocals (2008–2017); unclean vocals (2010–2014)
- Sean Bell – rhythm guitar, backing vocals (2011–2017), lead guitar (2013-2014)
- Chase Whitney – drums (2014–2017)

Former members

- Tyler Smith – clean vocals (2007)
- Ramin Niroomand – lead guitar, piano (2007–2013), rhythm guitar (2006–2007, 2011)
- Davey Owens – lead guitar (2006–2007)
- Mehdi Niroomand – drums (2006–2013)
- Michael Guy – keyboards (2006–2007)
- Franklin Tran - clean vocals, piano (2012–2013) (Touring Only)

Timeline

== Discography ==
Studio albums

Year	Title	Label	Chart positions			
Year	Title	Label	Top 200	US Indie	US Heat	Hard Rock
January 6, 2009	Your World on Fire	Rise	193	23	8	—
June 15, 2010	Imperial	Rise	—	32	4	18
October 16, 2012	In Fear and Faith	Rise	143	37	3	12

EPs

- Voyage (2007, self-released)
- Symphonies (2011, Rise)

Demos

- In Fear and Faith (2006, self-released)

Other songs

- "Bite the Bullet and Pray to God" (First demo of "Silence Is Screaming" recorded in 2006)
- "Words for Your Eulogy" (First demo of "The Taste of Regret" recorded in 2006)
- "Gangsta's Paradise" (Coolio ft. L.V. cover, released in 2008)
- "The End" (demo version, 2009 Myspace exclusive)
- "It All Comes Out (On the Way Down)" (single version, released in 2011)
- "Billie Jean" (Michael Jackson cover, released in 2012 as a tribute for the third anniversary of his death)

== Videography ==
- "Live Love Die" (Voyage, 2008)
- "Your World on Fire" (Your World on Fire, 2009)
- "The Road to Hell Is Paved with Good Intentions" (Your World on Fire, 2009)
- "Bones" (Imperial, 2010)
- "Counselor" (Imperial, 2011)
- "Billie Jean" (Michael Jackson cover) (2012)
