= Life Cycles (The Word Alive album) =

Studio album by The Word Alive
- Released: July 3, 2012
- Recorded: February 7 – March 7, 2012
- Studio: Foundation Recording (Connersville, Indiana)
- Genre: Metalcore
- Length: 50:12
- Label: Fearless
- Producer: Joey Sturgis

The Word Alive chronology
Deceiver (2010)	Life Cycles (2012)	Real (2014)

Singles from Life Cycles
- 1. "Entirety" Released: June 8, 2012; 2. "Life Cycles" Released: June 18, 2012

Life Cycles is the second studio album by American metalcore band The Word Alive. The album was released on July 3, 2012, through Fearless Records and was produced by Joey Sturgis. The album features a heavier and more "metal-headed" sound as stated by lead vocalist Tyler Smith. Life Cycles is the first release by the band to be without keyboardist, Dusty Riach, who parted ways with the band at the beginning of 2012.

During the album session a total of 17 tracks were recorded, although only 13 of the tracks made it on the album. A deluxe version was originally planned; however, it never came to fruition. However, both Amazon and iTunes digital versions have a bonus track respectively.

== Background and recording ==
By the end of 2011, The Word Alive had already confirmed plans to head into the studio for their second album along with stating that it will be produced by Joey Sturgis. The album was claimed to have a heavier, more mature sound due to the fact that the band chose Sturgis as the producer for the album over their previous producer Andrew Wade.

It was announced on February 2, 2012, that longtime keyboardist Dusty Riach and drummer Justin Salinas would be parting ways with the band, making this the first release without Riach. At the end of March, the band officially acquired a new drummer by the name of Luke Holland, however, Holland was not included for the recording sessions of Life Cycles. The drumming for the record was instead recorded by a friend of the band, and drummer for the band Sleepwalker, Matt Horn, wherein Holland joined after these sessions were already completed. On April 1, 2012, during a show at the Extreme Thing festival in Las Vegas, Smith announced that the album would be released on July 3, 2012.

During the album session a total of 17 tracks were recorded, although only 13 of the tracks made it on the album. A deluxe version was originally planned; however, it never came to fruition. Despite this both Amazon and iTunes digital versions have a bonus track respectively.

The album debuted at number 50 on the Billboard 200, selling nearly 10,000 copies in its first week.

== Release and promotion ==
The band debuted a song from the album for the first time ever on March 31, 2012, at Las Vegas' Extreme Thing festival, which was also the first performance ever to include the group's current drummer, Luke Holland. The title of the song that was played was "Wishmaster".

On May 8, The Word Alive revealed the cover art for the album, along with the full track listing for the standard pressing of the album. On May 15, The Word Alive released a preview of their track Wishmaster on their Facebook page. The preview includes tour dates for the All Stars Tour. On May 31, the band released another 33 second preview for the "Entirety". Included with this preview, they announced that pre-orders for the album will be on June 7 and that anyone who pre-orders will receive a free digital copy of "Entirety". On June 7, a lyric video for "Entirety" was posted on select sites, such as Revolver Magazine. On June 18, the album titled song "Life Cycles" was released as the album's second single.

== Critical reception ==
Professional ratings
Aggregate scores
Source	Rating
Metacritic	(80/100)
Review scores
Source	Rating
AbsolutePunk	80%
AllMusic	favorable
Alternative Press	4/5 stars
Kerrang!	4/5 stars
Revolver	3.5/5 stars
Rock Sound	8/10 stars
Ultimate Guitar Archive	9/10 stars

The album received generally positive reviews from music critics upon its release. At Metacritic the album received an average score of 80 out of 100, based on 5 reviews, which indicates "generally favorable reviews". Matt Higgs of Rock Sound said "Life Cycles may not be pushing the boundaries, keeping much of the stylisations of the band's debut, but the sum really is as great as all of its parts". Drew Beringer of AbsolutePunk said "Even if this isn't your preferred genre, there is no denying that Life Cycles is one of the most personal and genuine albums of 2012" and continued "The Word Alive isn't trying to be the next this or the biggest that, rather Tyler Smith and company are just trying to give music fans something honest and heartfelt, something they accomplish wholeheartedly on Life Cycles."

Kim Woodcock of Kill the Music said that "...the decision to not replace the keyboardist allowed them to play around with an array of sounds to fill that space, and it seriously sounds awesome" and that "the harmonies on Tyler's cleans definitely boost the contrast between his voice and the screams."

The album debuted at number 50 on the billboard 200, selling nearly 10,000 copies in its first week.

== Track listing ==
Adapted from iTunes.

No.	Title	Length
1.	"Dragon Spell"	4:09
2.	"Wishmaster"	3:47
3.	"Entirety"	4:07
4.	"For Your Health"	3:34
5.	"Bar Fight"	3:41
6.	"Life Cycles"	4:21
7.	"Evolution"	4:25
8.	"Hidden Lakes"	3:30
9.	"Ambitionary"	3:09
10.	"Live a Lie"	4:14
11.	"Belong"	4:07
12.	"Room 126"	3:55
13.	"Astral Plane"	3:13
Total length:		50:12

Amazon bonus track
No.	Title	Length
14.	"The Conscience"	4:02
Total length:		54:14

Japanese and iTunes bonus track
No.	Title	Length
14.	"Smoke Monster"	3:51
Total length:		54:03

== Personnel ==
The Word Alive

- Tyler Smith – lead vocals
- Zack Hansen – guitars, backing vocals, keyboards, programming
- Tony Pizzuti – guitars, backing vocals, keyboards, programming
- Daniel Shapiro – bass

Additional musicians

- Matt Horn – drums

Additional personnel

- Joey Sturgis – engineering, mixing, mastering, production
- Allen Hessler – vocal production

== Charts ==
Chart (2011)	Peak position
US Billboard 200	50
US Independent Albums (Billboard)	7
US Top Hard Rock Albums (Billboard)	5
US Top Rock Albums (Billboard)	20
