= The Word Alive =

American metalcore band

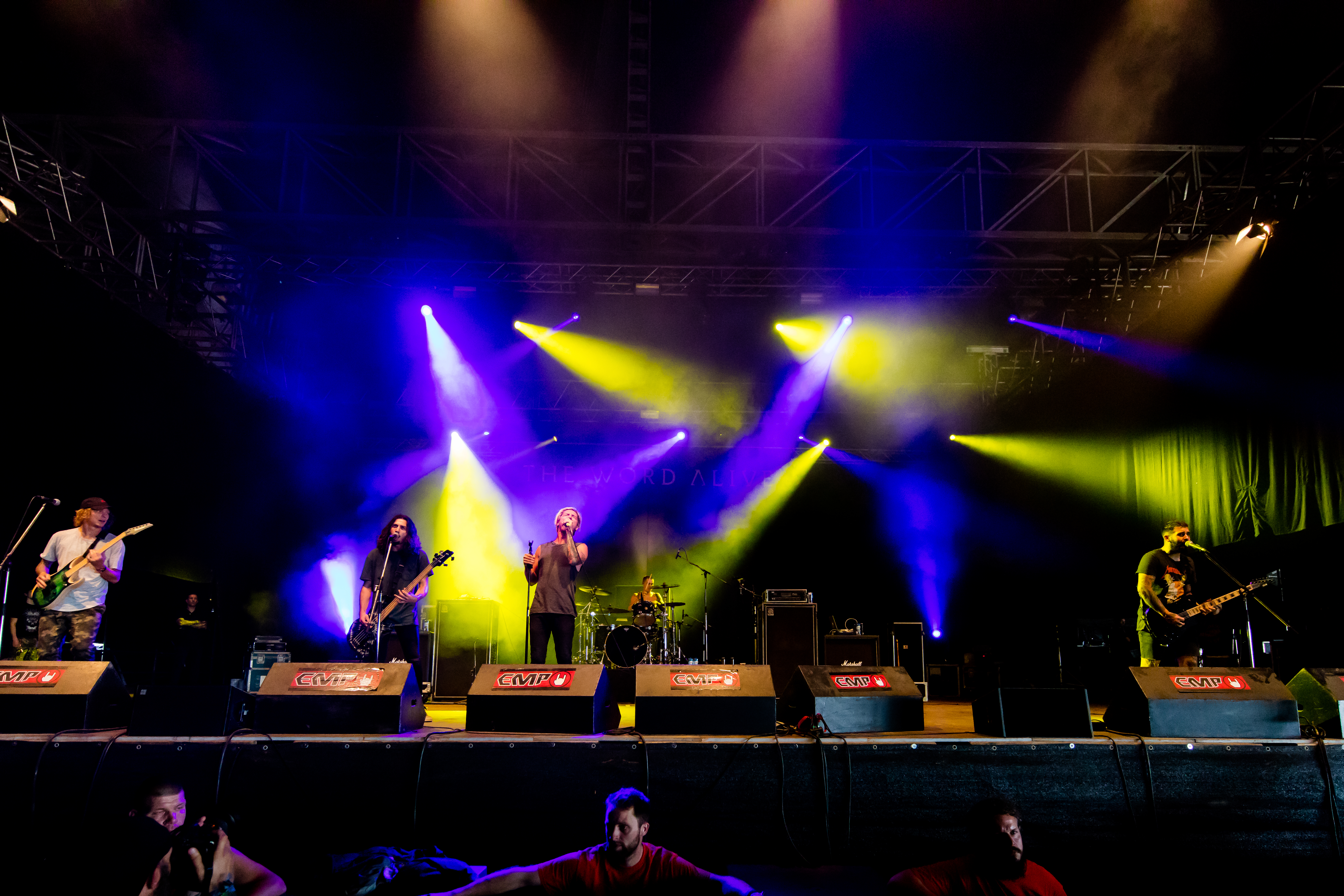
- The Word Alive performing in 2016; from left to right: Zack Hansen, Daniel Shapiro, Tyler Smith, Luke Holland (back), and Tony Pizzuti

Background information
- Origin: Phoenix, Arizona, U.S.
- Genres: Metalcore; post-hardcore; melodic metalcore; alternative metal; electronicore
- Years active: 2008–present
- Labels: Thriller; Fearless
- Spinoff of: Clouds Take Shape; Blessthefall; Escape the Fate; Calling of Syrens
- Members: Tyler Smith; Jose DelRio; Logan Abernethy; Devin Attard
- Past members: Craig Mabbitt; Tony Aguilera; Nick Urlacher; Dusty Riach; Justin Salinas; Luke Holland; Daniel Shapiro; Tony Pizzuti; Matt Horn; Zack Hansen; Daniel Nelson
- Website: wearethewordalive.com

The Word Alive (Note: Frequently misspelled as "The World Alive") is an American metalcore band formed in Phoenix in 2008. The band was signed to Fearless Records since their formation. In 2022, they changed their label and signed to Thriller Records. The band consists of vocalist Tyler Smith, guitarist, bassist and keyboardist Jose DelRio, guitarist and bassist Logan Abernethy, and drummer Devin Attard. Their second EP, Empire reached No. 15 on the Top Heatseekers, meeting a great amount of positive acclaim upon its release in 2009. In 2010, the group recorded their debut studio album, Deceiver and released it on August 31, 2010. It reached No. 97 on the Billboard 200 and No.15 on Independent Albums.

== History ==
=== Formation (2008–2009) ===
The Word Alive was founded in 2008 by Craig Mabbitt (lead vocals) with Zack Hansen (guitar) and Tony Pizzuti (guitar) who were former members of the bands Clouds Take Shape and Calling of Syrens. As a side project of Mabbitt during his part in Escape the Fate, the remaining required members he recruited to start The Word Alive were chosen to be Nick Urlacher (bass guitar), Dusty Riach (keyboards) and Tony Aguilera (drums). The group recorded songs with the intention of releasing them as a self-titled EP, never being officially released but leaked to P2P networks such as Soulseek. Later on, the band forced Mabbitt to leave due to their dissatisfaction with Escape the Fate's schedules, which required Mabbitt to work as a full-time member.

The day after, Mabbitt posted a blog to his fans explaining that leaving the band was not his decision and that "[The Word Alive] pretty much replaced me while I was on the road due to the fact that they wanted to tour and couldn't until I was available, I started that band with those guys and I'm very hurt at how they replaced me while I was touring...it's bullshit." On December 3, the band officially announced that Tyler Smith, who was formerly one of the vocalists for In Fear and Faith and bassist for Greeley Estates, joined The Word Alive as their new vocalist.

Feeling somewhat stagnant in their progression beforehand, the addition of Smith catapulted the band's ambitions to the forefront. With this initiation, their goals and aspirations were much more a reality, and they set to work on what would become their record label debut, Empire.

=== Empire (2009–2010) ===
During March 2009, the band was taken in with a contract by a new label, later on during that month the group officially confirmed that the label they were then signed to was Fearless Records. Smith stated "We hope to just keep touring, touring, touring... we couldn't be happier or more appreciative to be on tour right now, I think despite having some of the worst luck in the early beginnings of being a touring band yet never missing a show, we always have a positive attitude and that will make us a stronger band." The band set out to create an EP to be released through the label wherein it was titled Empire and was recorded with producer Andrew Wade in Ocala, Florida. It was released on July 21, 2009, where it reached No. 15 on the Billboard Heatseeker chart.

In regards to the creation of the EP, Smith stated that The Word Alive all "feed off of each other really well, we take a little bit of everything we like and put it together to try and give the listener at least something to grasp onto when they hear a song for the first time. We consider ourselves a metal band who enjoy singing a lot. As much as we love being brutal, we love being referred to as 'epic' and 'beautiful'. It works for us." After the release of their EP, the band went on multiple tours with an array of popular post-hardcore bands such as Alesana, A Skylit Drive and Silverstein. The Word Alive headlined with We Came as Romans on the "Dreams & Empires Tour" during the summer of 2009; from late July to mid-August. In October 2009, the band went on tour with Silverstein, Madina Lake and I See Stars. Shortly after that tour they played on the "You'd Be Way Cuter in a Coffin Tour" with Alesana on "The Emptiness Tour" which took place during early 2010. The Word Alive's single "Battle Royale" from Empire was hugely successful, leading the song to be featured in the popular Tap Tap series as well as it being featured as downloadable content in the Rock Band series of music games. The track is also featured on the 2010 Vans Warped Tour Compilation and later went onto being credited as the group's signature song.

During February the band reached an agreement to leave founding drummer, Tony Aguilera out of the group. Both parties (Aguilera and the rest of the band) shared their concerns and reasoning for the matter publicly. It was overall described that the band wanted to pursue a different percussionist of alternate talent than the founding member. Aguilera was replaced with Justin Salinas, who was previously a part of the bands Scars of Tomorrow and Catherine as well as serving as a past live drummer for MyChildren MyBride.

On March 23, 2010, a live music video for the song "The Only Rule Is That There Are No Rules" was released and includes Aguilera in its filming, making it the last release of media by the band to feature him. The video premiered on AOL's Noisecreep with a highly positive acclaim:

"Metal-hardcore act the Word Alive have finally unveiled the video for 'The Only Rule Is That There Are No Rules'. 'We couldn't be happier', vocalist [Tyler Smith] told Noisecreep on the finished look of the band's first video. For the heavy driven track from the sextet's Empire EP, the obvious choice was to bring eyes and ears to their live show – which has been getting the band quick success for only being a little over a year old. 'Our live performance has become a staple of that growth', commented Smith. Rather than having the song play over a performance at the Glasshouse in Pomona, Calif, a full effect approach was taken. 'Our director had the idea of filming the set and intertwining live audio to spice up the clip.'"

=== Deceiver (2010–2011) ===
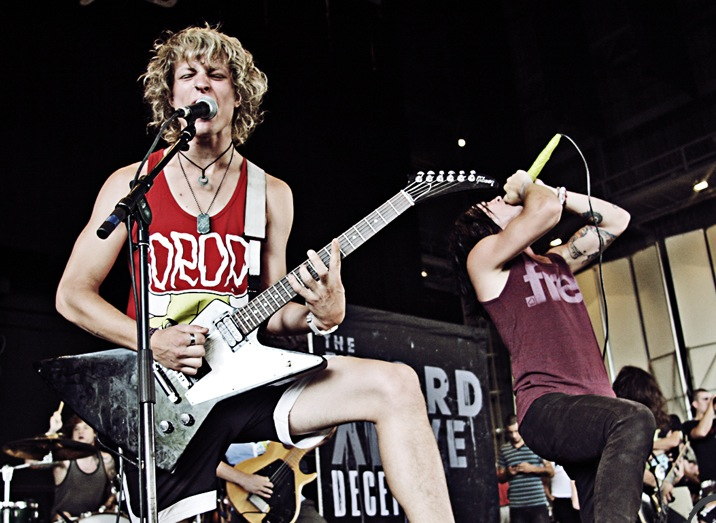
The Word Alive performing at Warped Tour 2010

In April 2010, the band entered the studio in Ocala, Florida, with Andrew Wade to record their debut studio album, Deceiver. Frontman Tyler Smith noted that "We wanted to step it up in every aspect of our songs compared to Empire. When we're heavy, it's heavier. When we do things big, they are huge! When we slow it down, it's something beautiful." After the recording process of the album was finished, the band accepted to be featured as one of the many performing acts at the Bamboozle Music Festival in New Jersey on May 1, 2010, and following Bamboozle, The Word Alive participated in a headlining tour with Stray from the Path for two weeks, which was also in May.

By June, Deceiver was fully mastered and engineered. On June 23, 2010, the band premiered their first single from the album, "Epiphany" as streaming media online. The following day, Fearless Records released their 2010 Summer Sampler which also featured the track "Epiphany". A week later, the album's album art and track listing was released. Guitarist Zack Hansen explained upon this premiere that "We all felt like that was going to be the best choice considering how comfortable the recording process is with Andrew. The tracking was a lot of fun and everyone had a good time. We got the opportunity to stay in a house while we recorded and surprisingly we didn't party as much as I thought we would haha." Hansen later followed along explaining that his favorite track on the record is "The Hounds of Anubis", which was written by him and Pizzuti and stated that he "wrote this song with an 'Egyptian feel' to it and I think we got our point across." Smith described that its lyrics describe the times of when The Word Alive overcame their hardships that they face with the help and support from their fans. "The Hounds of Anubis" was released as the album's second single on July 26, 2010. It premiered on the official Revolver website.

The Word Alive performed on Warped Tour 2010 along with Alesana, Artist vs. Poet, Sparks the Rescue and Motionless in White, it has also been confirmed that they will as well be participating the 2011 Warped Tour in its entirety. The band was a part of "The Anti-Hero Tour" where the group performed alongside Bleeding Through, After the Burial, Stray from the Path and Dead & Divine. The tour ran from September to October. Upon Deceiver's release on August 31, it charted at No. 97 on the Billboard 200. The band is featured in the compilation album Punk Goes Pop 3, covering the Kanye West song "Heartless". The song was produced by Matt Grabe and was released on November 2, 2010. In 2011, the band also recorded a cover version of the Ozzy Osbourne song "Over the Mountain". Both the "Heartless" and "Over the Mountain" covers by the band are the last recorded songs to feature bassist and founding member, Nick Urlacher before his departure from the group on December 27, 2010. Daniel Shapiro of Sharks Never Sleep served as a touring member for The Word Alive shortly after Urlacher's leaving. The music video for their song "2012" was released on January 17, 2011, where Shapiro is featured in its recording. Months later, still searching for a bassist and before leading into the summer of 2011, it was then decided on Shapiro becoming a permanent member of the band.

=== Departure of Riach and Salinas, and Life Cycles (2012–2013) ===
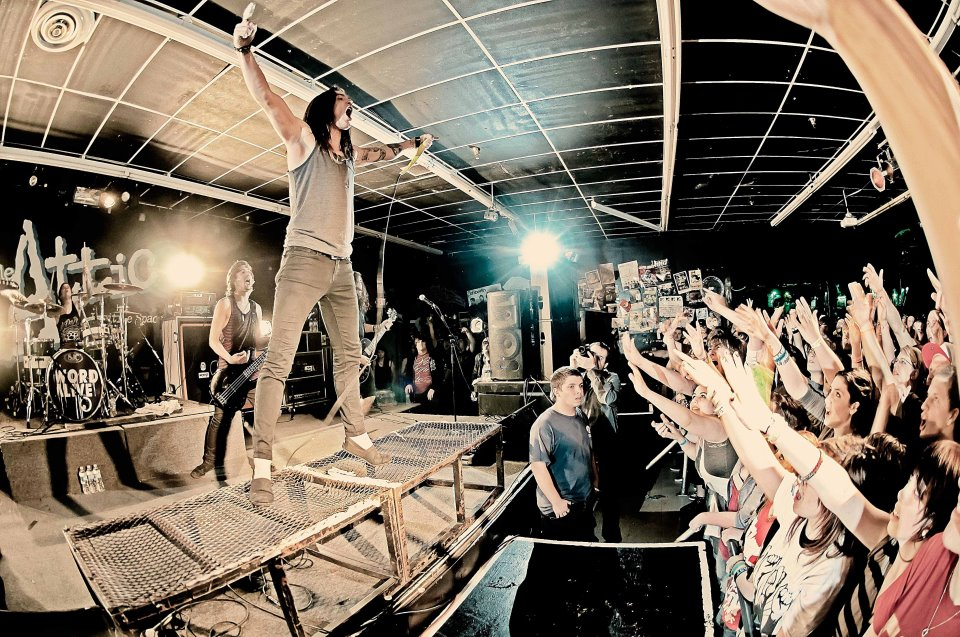
The Word Alive performing live at the Slam Dunk Festival in 2012

By November 2011, the band made plans to return to the studio on February 7, 2012, with Joey Sturgis to begin recording their next album, with an expected recording session lasting from that time until mid-March. However, by February (and before the date of entering the studio), the announcement of two members leaving occurred; keyboardist, Dusty Riach and drummer, Justin Salinas were simultaneously confirmed to no longer be a part of the band. Salinas stated his reason was because he grew tired of touring, although Riach's reason was preferred to be kept silent.

In regards to the band's second studio album, it was reported that 17 songs were recorded in its process; 13 of which make up the album. Two of the four remaining songs that did not get included on the album, were put up as bonus tracks on Amazon & iTunes. As for the other two tracks, one of them was never completed and the other was thrown out. The name of the album is Life Cycles and was released on July 3. On March 23, the group issued a statement that 19-year-old Arizona resident Luke Holland (of YouTube fame) had joined as the new drummer, however, Holland was not included for the recording sessions of Life Cycles. The drumming for the record was performed by drummer Matt Horn wherein Holland joined after these sessions were already completed. The band's performance of March 31 at Las Vegas' Extreme Thing music and sports festival was the first ever live performance with Holland.

In November 2012, they supported Parkway Drive on the "European Atlas Tour" with Emmure and Structures. Once again, They also joined Parkway Drive again in March 2013 with Veil of Maya and While She Sleeps for the "United States Atlas Tour". In May 2013, they supported Sleeping with Sirens on their UK tour along with Our Last Night. They will also appear at the Slam Dunk festival in May 2013. In the summer of 2013, they supported Killswitch Engage along with Miss May I, Darkest Hour and Affiance on the "Disarm the Descent U.S Tour".

=== Real (2013–2015) ===
In an interview with Dead Press! while on the Manchester date of their UK tour supporting Parkway Drive in November, guitarist Zack Hansen revealed that the band plans to release a new EP in 2013 followed by another full-length record in 2014.

On August 1, 2013, the band entered the studio with Cameron Mizell to work on their third studio album which will probably be released in early 2014. On August 18, the band posted a photo on Instagram detailing the progress on their next album. On August 27, Sumerian Records released a tour trailer video announcing the "Started From The Bottom Now We Here Tour" which is a North American tour where The Word Alive will co-headline with I See Stars. The tour also features Crown the Empire, Get Scared, Dayshell, and Palisades. On November 5, an interview with the band's frontman Smith he discussed the band's next album being released in spring 2014. On the sound of the album Smith stated that the album will have some of the heaviest songs they have ever written, along with songs that will be composed of all singing vocals. He also stated that the album is completely recorded and currently being mastered. The reason behind the delay is that the band are trying to get some of their friends to contribute on the album. The band also expects to have a single released by the end of the year. On December 18, the band announced "The Unconditional Tour" beginning in late February through March with fellow acts Memphis May Fire, A Skylit Drive, Hands Like Houses and Beartooth. Later that day, the band released their first studio update in a planned series for their forthcoming album with a projected spring release through Fearless Records.

On January 6, 2014, the band officially announced that Cameron Mizell and John Feldmann are the producers for their forthcoming album on Facebook. On March 18, the band released the single "Play the Victim". Along with the song, they also announced their third studio album Real would be released on June 10. The album will be the first to feature Luke Holland on drums. Real remains the most personal album to date from The Word Alive, which has received enormous support from fans (especially the track "Never Forget"). The band also played the entire Vans Warped Tour in 2014. In November 2014, the band also did their own headlining tour to support the album Real with Myka, Relocate, The Dead Rabbitts, Our Last Night and The Color Morale as support. In March 2015, the band also supported The Devil Wears Prada on the "Zombie 5 Tour" along with Born of Osiris and Secrets. In April, The band did headlining shows in Hong Kong, Taipei and Bangkok. Then they played at Pulp Summer Slam XV: Angels Descend in the Philippines on April 25 with bands such as Escape the Fate, Cradle of Filth, Chthonic, Suffocation, Carcass and Killswitch Engage with the crowd of 30,000 metal fans.

Following this, the band embarked on a co-headlining tour with Chelsea Grin with support from Like Moths to Flames and Sylar. After a brief break during the summer, which the band used to work on their next album, the band continued touring and supported Parkway Drive on the Australian leg of the "IRE Tour" with Memphis May Fire and Thy Art Is Murder. While on the "Apollo X Tour" with Motionless in White and The Devil Wears Prada in mid-November, frontman Tyler Smith broke his back, several ribs, and bruised a lung while stage diving during a show. The band released a statement the following day saying they would not be missing any dates despite their frontman's injury. Smith continued to perform, though his movements were very limited, and he had to wear a back brace.

=== Dark Matter, and departure of Holland and Shapiro (2015–2017) ===
The band announced they would be releasing their fourth studio album, Dark Matter, on March 18, 2016. The band also revealed the tracklist and a headlining North American tour with support from Fit for a King and Out Came the Wolves. The album's lead single, "Trapped", was released January 8. On February 19, the band released the second single "Sellout". On March 4, they released the third and final single "Made This Way".

In March 2016, American band Rainey's Revenge got into an altercation with the tour manager for The Word Alive. In November 2016, Luke Holland announced he will be leaving the band at the end of 2016 after finishing their last tour of the year to pursue other musical endeavors. In conjunction with the announcement, on November 3, 2016, the band released the single "Overdose", and announced their Overdose Tour, taking place throughout November and December.

In February 2017, the band announced that Matt Horn would be taking Holland's place as drummer. Shortly after, the single "Misery" was released on March 10, 2017. On August 7, the band and Daniel Shapiro mutually announced they were parting ways due to a "new musical adventure" of Shapiro's. The next day, the band announced that they would be joining I Prevail on their "Rage on Stage Tour". We Came as Romans and Escape the Fate would also be joining the tour.

=== Violent Noise and Monomania (2018–2020) ===
On March 29, 2018, the band announced their fifth studio album, Violent Noise, to be released on May 4. On March 30, the band released the album's lead single "Red Clouds". On April 20, they released the album's second and final single "Why Am I Like This?". On May 8, the band confirmed during a Reddit AMA that Matt Horn would be their permanent drummer. The band also supported Blessthefall on their "Hard Feelings Tour" with Ded, Thousand Below and A War Within also joining up on the line-up.

On September 26, Riot Games released the song "Rise" on which the band collaborated with electronic artists The Glitch Mob and Mako. The song was the official theme of the 2018 League of Legends World Championship. On October 24, Riot Games released an official remix of "Rise" featuring Bobby from the South Korean boy band iKon. In 2019, the band did a summer tour playing their debut album Deceiver, in celebration of the album's 10th anniversary, co-headlining the tour with Miss May I, with Thousand Below and After Life as support.

On November 1, 2019, the band released the lead single of their upcoming album titled "Burning Your World Down". On January 10, 2020, the band released the second single and title track "Monomania" along with an accompanying music video. That same day, the band revealed the tracklist, album's official artwork and announced that their sixth studio album Monomania would be released on February 21, 2020. On January 24, the band released the third single of the album titled "No Way Out" and its corresponding music video. On February 7, two weeks before the album release, the band released the fourth single "Searching for Glory". On October 16, the band released their cover of Incubus' "Pardon Me" on streaming music services.

=== Hard Reset and line-up instability (2021–present) ===
On October 22, 2021, the band announced that drummer Matt Horn and founding guitarist Tony Pizzuti departed from the band on good terms. Tyler Ross formerly of Being as an Ocean and Mat Madiro of From Ashes to New would fill up their places on Starset's Horizons U.S. tour along with All Good Things, which started in November 2021.

On November 17, 2021, the band announced that they had parted ways with Fearless Records and had signed with Thriller Records.

The band's seventh studio album Hard Reset, was released on August 25, 2023 through Thriller Records. The album spawned five singles with "Wonderland", "Nocturnal Future", "Slow Burn", "Hate Me" (featuring Julian Comeau of Loveless), "Strange Love", and "New Reality".

On May 30, 2024, Zack Hansen announced that he had stepped away from the band, citing personal reasons. On May 31, The Word Alive stated that Hansen had been removed from the band in response to allegations of domestic violence made against him by a romantic partner. The band went on to recruit guitarist Logan Abernethy to fill their empty guitar slot on tour, with Abernethy eventually joining the band full time in April of 2025.

On the same day Abernethy's joining was announced, the band also announced the departure of drummer Daniel Nelson, citing his desire to pursue other ventures and effectively retire from touring. Drummer Devin Attard was recruited to take his place.

In February 2026, the band was announced as part of the lineup for the Louder Than Life music festival in Louisville, scheduled to take place in September. The band are also confirmed to be making an appearance at Welcome to Rockville, which will take place in Daytona Beach, Florida in May 2026.

== Musical style ==
The Word Alive's musical style has been described as metalcore, melodic metalcore, post-hardcore,, electronicore and alternative metal.

== Band members ==
Current

- Tyler Smith – lead vocals (2008–present)
- Jose DelRio – guitars, bass, keyboards, programming, backing vocals (2022–present)
- Logan Abernethy – guitars, bass, backing vocals (2025–present; touring member 2024–2025)
- Devin Attard – drums (2025–present)

Former

- Craig Mabbitt – lead vocals (2008)
- Tony Aguilera – drums (2008–2010)
- Nick Urlacher – bass (2008–2010)
- Dusty Riach – keyboards, programming (2008–2012)
- Justin Salinas – drums (2010–2012)
- Luke Holland – drums (2012–2016)
- Daniel Shapiro – bass (2011–2017; touring member 2010; occasional guest 2025–present); backing vocals (2015–2017)
- Tony Pizzuti – guitars, backing vocals (2008–2021); keyboards, programming (2012–2021); bass (2017–2021)
- Matt Horn – drums (2018–2021; touring member 2012, 2017–2018)
- Zack Hansen – guitars, backing vocals (2008–2024); keyboards, programming (2012–2024); bass (2017–2024)
- Daniel Nelson – drums (2022–2025)

Touring

- Tyler Ross – guitars (2021–2022)
- Mat Madiro – drums (2021–2022)

Timeline

== Discography ==
Studio albums

- Deceiver (2010)
- Life Cycles (2012)
- Real (2014)
- Dark Matter (2016)
- Violent Noise (2018)
- Monomania (2020)
- Hard Reset (2023)
