= Tyler Smith (musician) =

American musician (born 1986)

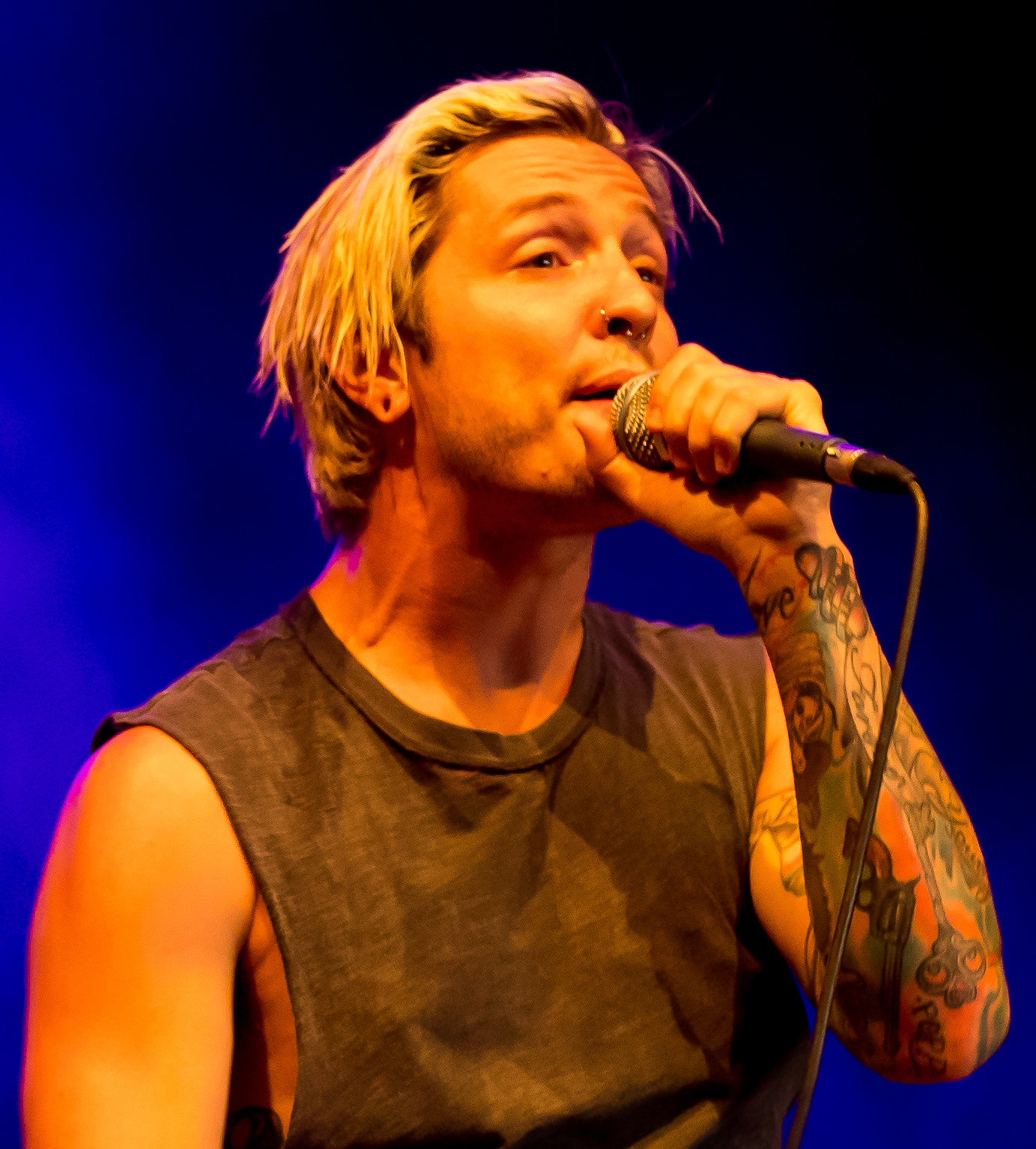
- Smith in 2016 with the Word Alive

Background information
- Also known as: Telle
- Born: Tyler Smith; August 9, 1986 (age 40); Dayton, Ohio, U.S.
- Origin: Dayton, Ohio, U.S.
- Genres: Metalcore; post-hardcore; alternative rock; nu metal; alternative metal; pop
- Occupations: Musician; songwriter
- Instruments: Vocals; guitar; bass; keys/piano
- Years active: 2006–present
- Member of: The Word Alive; Greeley Estates
- Formerly of: In Fear and Faith

Tyler Lee Smith (born August 9, 1986), also known by his nickname Telle, is an American musician and songwriter. He is currently the lead vocalist of metalcore band The Word Alive originally based out of Phoenix AZ (now in Nashville TN) and has played in several bands, such as Greeley Estates and In Fear and Faith, Emarosa, March and Collapse, and his solo project titled "TELLE". He is known for his tenor singing voice, wide vocal range and ability to comprehensively alternate between melodic and screamed vocals.

== Musical career ==
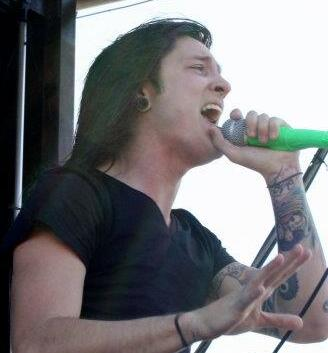
Smith in 2012

Smith joined In Fear and Faith as one of their two lead vocalists in May 2007 to replace founding vocalist Jarred DeArmas. Smith performed on the band's debut release Voyage and was a member of the band until January 2008 (a month after the release of the EP), when he joined Phoenix, Arizona-based Greeley Estates as bassist.

Smith was a member of Greeley Estates from January 2008 to November 2008. He left the band on November 14, 2008, the day before the band was about to go on tour with Alesana. The band said "not to fret" and that the position would be filled. During this brief association, Smith was featured on some tracks from the album Go West Young Man, Let the Evil Go East.

Upon his departure, he joined the Word Alive, originally fronted by former Blessthefall and Escape the Fate's Craig Mabbitt, on December 3, 2008. Smith replaced Mabbitt, due to Mabbitt's unavailability to tour with the band. Smith is featured on the band's first officially released EP, Empire. A year in advance of its release, Smith confirmed the writing of the Word Alive's first studio album. On January 20, 2010, he stated it would be titled Deceiver. Deceiver was released on August 31, 2010.

In 2010, the Word Alive were included in Underoath's November tour. At the Mission, Texas show, Smith substituted for Underoath vocalist Spencer Chamberlain who had contracted food poisoning during the tour's final week. On January 24, 2011, while the Word Alive were on tour with Texas in July and For Today, Smith was hospitalized due to an unknown virus and bacterial bronchitis, laryngitis and pharyngitis along with a fever of 103.6 °F. He missed 9 tour dates. In 2011, Smith wrote and completed two new songs, "Apologician" and "Lights and Stones", for the deluxe edition of Deceiver, which was released on June 7, 2011.

On March 31, 2012, The Word Alive released a new song by the name of "Wishmaster". On that same day, they confirmed the new album Life Cycles would be released on July 3. The album currently has two singles called "Entirety" and the eponymous "Life Cycles".

== Personal life ==
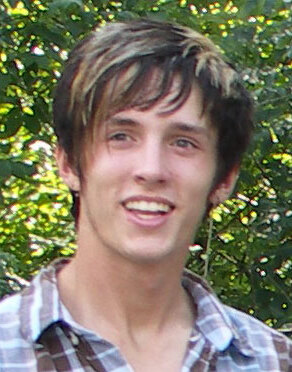
Smith in 2006

Tyler Smith was born in Dayton, Ohio. Has two younger brothers Travis and Tanner. Went to a Christian school Spring Valley Academy.

By early 2011, Smith began a clothing line by the name of Resist & Rebel, which he co-operated with Andrew Paiano (Woe, Is Me) until 2013 when Andrew stepped down.

== Discography ==
In Fear and Faith

- Voyage (2007)

Greeley Estates

- Go West Young Man, Let the Evil Go East (2008)

The Word Alive

- Empire (2009)
- Deceiver (2010)
- Life Cycles (2012)
- Real (2014)
- Dark Matter (2016)
- Violent Noise (2018)
- Monomania (2020)
- Hard Reset (2023)

Solo

- "A Mountain" (2011)
- "Touch of Your Lips" (2012)
- "Crazy" (2020)
- "Too Hard on Myself" (2020)
- "Letting Go" featuring Mindy White (2021)

== Collaborations ==
Year	Song	Album	Artist	Link
2010	"Intentions" (featuring Telle Smith)	To Plant a Seed	We Came as Romans	
2011	"Not Another Song About You" (featuring Telle Smith)	Trust in Few	We Are Defiance	
2011	"The Taste of Regret" (featuring Telle Smith)	Symphonies	In Fear and Faith	
2012	"Disclosure" (featuring Telle Smith)	I'm Not Dying Today	Palisades	
2012	"Streetlights for Streetfights" (featuring Telle Smith)	Non-album single	Etienne Sin	
2012	"Whiskey for the Soul" (featuring Telle Smith)	Chapters	Adestria	
2012	"All Worth It" (featuring Telle Smith)	Non-album single	Goodmorning, Gorgeous	
2013	"Rebearth" (featuring Telle Smith)	Live Life	Capture the Crown	
2013	"Useless" (featuring Telle Smith)	Lies to Light the Way	Myka, Relocate	
2013	"Conceiver" (featuring Telle Smith)	Conceiver	Before You Fall	
2013	"Passion Born" (featuring Telle Smith)	Non-album single	A Call to Sincerity	
2014	"I've Earned My Time" (featuring Telle Smith)	The World Is My Enemy Now	Upon a Burning Body	
2014	"Demons in Disguise" (featuring Telle Smith)	Non-album single	Etienne Sin	
2015	"Hell to Pay" (featuring Telle Smith)	Never Endings	Too Close to Touch	
2015	"Never Surrender" (featuring Telle Smith)	Paramount	It Lies Within	
2016	"Perfect" (featuring Telle Smith)	Non-album single	Echo Black	
2016	"Reflections" (featuring Telle Smith)	As the Sky Falls Through	Behind the Fallen	
2017	"Act I: Elysium 77" (featuring Telle Smith)	Vicious World	MyChildren MyBride	
2018	"Clockwork" (featuring Telle Smith)	Non-album single	Amor	
2018	"The Discovery" (featuring Telle Smith)	Gravity	Paul Bartolome	
2018	"Rise"	Non-album single	The Word Alive, the Glitch Mob and Mako	
2019	"Weakest Condition" (featuring Telle Smith)	The Darkest Moment	The Darkest Moment	
2019	"Medicate Me" (featuring Telle Smith)	Rock Ain't Dead	Davey Suicide	
2019	"Uber and a Fifth" (featuring Telle Smith)	Non-album single	Sponge	
2019	"Someone You Loved" (Lewis Capaldi cover; featuring the Word Alive, I See Stars and Ashland)	Non-album single	Our Last Night	
2020	"Falling" (featuring Telle Smith)	Unseen Relations	Our Mirage	
2021	"I'll Find a Way" (featuring Telle Smith)	Sentinels of Light	League of Legends	
2021	"Make It Through" (featuring Telle Smith)	Non-album single	Descape	
2022	"Death by Admiration" (featuring Telle Smith)	Death by Admiration	Seventh Day Slumber	
2022	"The Way Back" (featuring Telle Smith & DJ Lethal)	In Absentia, Vol. 1 - EP	Set The Sun	
2023	"More Than Misery" (featuring Telle Smith)	Reflections	Caskets	
2023	"Hopeless" (featuring Telle Smith)	Non-album single	Too Close to Touch	
