= Recover (Confide album) =

Studio album by Confide
- Released: May 18, 2010
- Recorded: December 2009, at The Foundation Recording Studios, Connersville, Indiana
- Genre: Post-hardcore, metalcore
- Length: 34:15
- Label: Tragic Hero
- Producer: Joey Sturgis, Tom Denney

Confide chronology
Shout the Truth (2008)	Recover (2010)	All Is Calm (2013)

Singles from Recover
- 1. "When Heaven Is Silent" Released: 7 April 2010; 2. "Now or Never" Released: 21 April 2010; 3. "Tighten It Up" Released: 28 April 2010; 4. "The View from My Eyes" Released: 8 October 2010

Professional ratings
Review scores
Source	Rating
Alternative Press	3/5 stars
Jesus Freak Hideout	4.5/5 stars

Recover is the second full-length album by American metalcore band Confide, released on May 18, 2010 via Tragic Hero Records.

== Background ==
The album was recorded in the Winter of 2009 at The Foundation Studios by Joey Sturgis. Recover was the band's last album before disbanding in November 2010, but they reformed in late 2012 and independently released a third album in 2013. Recover was also the debut album of lead guitarist Joshua Paul, bassist Trevor Vickers (ex-Underneath the Gun) and drummer Joel Piper.

== Track listing ==
No.	Title	Length
1.	"When Heaven Is Silent"	2:56
2.	"Tighten It Up"	3:29
3.	"The View from My Eyes"	3:38
4.	"Now or Never"	3:26
5.	"Delete, Repeat"	2:44
6.	"My Choice of Words"	3:35
7.	"People Are Crazy"	2:50
8.	"Barely Breathing"	3:44
9.	"80B"	3:15
10.	"Tell Me I'm Not Alone" (feat. Brandon Wronski of Eye Alaska)	3:22
11.	"Write This Down"	3:16

iTunes Bonus Tracks
No.	Title	Length
12.	"Burning Bridges"	2:49
13.	"Real Life"	3:08

== Personnel ==
Confide

- Ross Michael Kenyon - lead vocals
- Jeffrey Helberg - rhythm guitar
- Joshua Paul - lead guitar
- Trevor Vickers - bass
- Joel Piper - drums, clean vocals, keyboards, programming

Production

- Produced, Engineered, Mixed, Mastered and additional programming by Joey Sturgis
- Co-produced, Engineered by Tom Denney
- Management by Eric Rushing and Judi Padilla (The Artery Foundation)
- Artwork and layout by Devotion Designs
- Painting by Ryan Carr
- Photography by Celina Kenyon

Additional notes

- All lyrics written by Kenyon and Piper
- Brandon Wronski - guest vocals on "Tell Me I'm Not Alone"
- Tom Denney - co-writing on "The View from My Eyes", "Now Or Never" and "Barely Breathing"
- William «Billy» Pruden - co-writing
- Album is dedicated to Stewart Teggart, 1966 - 2010.
