= Vesuvius (disambiguation) =

Vesuvius, also known as Mount Vesuvius, is a volcano in Italy that destroyed the Roman city of Pompeii.

Vesuvius may also refer to:

== Places ==
- Vesuvius, British Columbia, an unincorporated settlement in Canada also known as Vesuvius Bay and named after HMS Vesuvius
- Vesuvius, Virginia, an unincorporated community in the United States
- Vesuvius National Park, Italy, centered on the volcano
- 13897 Vesuvius, an asteroid

== Military ==
- Battle of Vesuvius won by Rome in 340 BC
- HMS Vesuvius, various Royal Navy ships (12 officially)
- USS Vesuvius, several US Navy ships (5) with first directly named for the famous volcano
- The code name for German World War II bases that were to launch the Wasserfall anti-aircraft missile
- Vesuvius Airfield, an American World War II airfield in southern Italy

== Arts and entertainment ==
- "Vesuvius" (How I Met Your Mother), an episode of the TV series How I Met Your Mother
- Vesuvius (UK record label), a British independent label
- A wind orchestral piece written by Frank Ticheli about the eruption of Mount Vesuvius
- "Vesuvius", a song by Sufjan Stevens, on his 2010 album The Age of Adz
- TCS Vesuvius, a starship in the Wing Commander science fiction universe
- Vesuvius, a fictional band in the movie The Rocker
- Vesuvius (band), a Canadian metal band, formed in 2012

== Other uses ==
- Vesuvius Observatory, Italy
- A type of fireworks that resembles a volcano
- Vesuvius plc a British maker of ceramic products
