= Joel Piper =

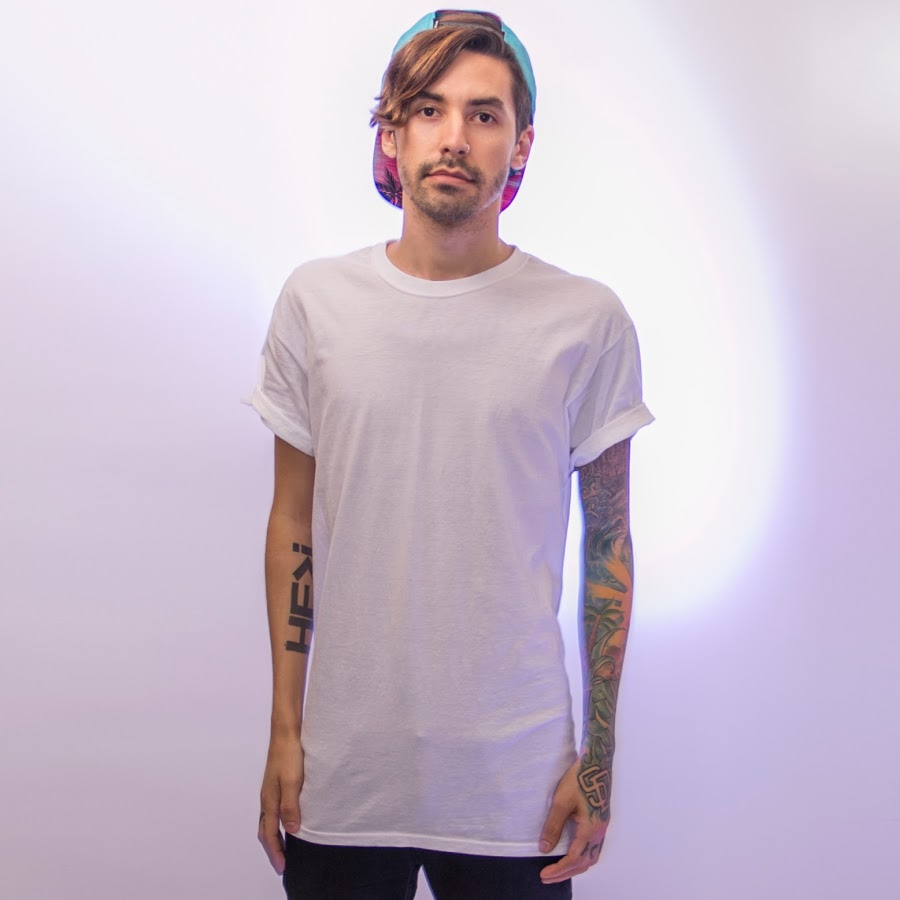

Background information
- Born: Joel Piper; October 18, 1985 (age 40); Sonora, Mexico
- Origin: San Diego, California
- Genres: Pop; rock; metalcore; post-hardcore; EDM
- Occupations: Singer; songwriter; percussionist; record producer; DJ
- Instruments: Vocals; drums; guitar; piano; bass; sampler
- Years active: 1998–present
- Website: Joel Piper's Official Website

Joel Piper (born October 18, 1985) is a Mexican-born American singer-songwriter, record producer, musician, and disc jockey born in Sonora, Mexico. He most famously known for being the ex-drummer and clean vocalist for the metalcore band Confide from 2009 to 2013. As a solo musician, he has released three full-length studio albums and three EPs.

== Early life ==
Joel Piper is half Native American and German. He was born on October 18, 1985, in Sonora, Mexico to missionary parents who resided in a humble cement home there for 5 years helping the less fortunate. He was raised there until he was 5, at just eighteen months old Piper started playing an actual drum beat on the couch with drum sticks cut in half by his father so his small hands could hold the sticks. He would make up songs and sing them all day long. Finding ways to jerry-rig components and devices, Joel made his own albums for him and his friends in which eventually progressed into producing and recording songs.

== Musical career ==
Piper played the drums for Olivia, a band from the north shore of Oahu, Hawaii.

Piper founded Avery Pkwy in 2006, the name “Avery Pkwy” came from a street in Orange County, California where he used to work and eventually started going to church there. He released one full-length album ‘You Have The Roadmap’ in 2006. The single 'Dream Big' was released on iTunes on March 11, 2014.

His debut EP, "The Only One" was released on November 1, 2011. With 210,000 downloads in one week, it debuted at No. 11 on the iTunes pop chart passing big names such as Justin Bieber, Demi Lovato and Adele. The EP also reached top 40 on the Billboard Heetseekers Chart. His debut pop album Dying to Live has an experimental and ballad heavy track list where he explores a different side of his songwriting abilities taking his sound to new depths with a unique and engaging blend of rich organic sounds with electro-pop touches. "Dying to Live" debuted at No. 17 on the iTunes pop charts, putting him side by side with Swedish House Mafia and Zedd.

== Discography ==
Joel Piper
Albums

- Dying to Live (self-released, 2012)
- Brand New Life (self-released, 2013)
- Celebrate (Deluxe Edition) (self-released, 2015)
- Elevate The Cure (self-released, 2016)

EPs

- The Only One (self-released, 2011)
- Averymerrychristmas (self-released, 2014)
- Peter Pan (Remixes) (self-released, 2015)

Singles

- "My Little Earthquake 2.0" (self-released, 2012)
- "Alive" (self-released, 2013)
- "We Are the Dreamers" (self-released, 2014)
- "When Will I Realize" (self-released, 2014)
- "Summer Love" (self-released, 2013)
- "Enough" (self-released, 2013)
- "Through the Night" (self-released, 2014)
- "Everyone (Shake Their Body)" (self-released, 2014)
- "Come With Me (Live Sessions)" (self-released, 2014)
- "Rule the World" (self-released, 2014)
- "The Maestro Of My Own" (self-released, 2015)
- "Will You Be Mine" (self-released, 2016)
- "In The Line Of Fire" (self-released, 2020)

Avery Pkwy
Albums

- You Have The Roadmap (2006)
- Elevate The Cure (2016)

EPs

- Averymerrychristmas (self-released, 2010) (As Avery Pkwy)

Singles

- My Apartment (self-released, 2009) (As Avery Pkwy)
- Love Story (Taylor Swift Cover) (self-released, 2010) (As Avery Pkwy)
- Dream Big (self-released, 2014) (As Avery Pkwy)

Confide
Albums

- Shout the Truth (Re-Issue) (2009)
- Recover (2010)
- All is Calm (2013)

Guest appearances

- "California Christmas" (2013) by Manafest

== Music videos ==
Year	Song	Producer	Album
2012	"My Little Earthquake 2.0"	Joel Piper	My Little Earthquake 2.0
2012	"Smile"	Joel Piper	Dying to Live
2013	"Summer Love"	Dan Coronado & Ian Robertson	Summer love
2014	"Dream Big"	Joel Piper, Tally Phillips and Dale Piper	Dream Big
2014	"When Will I Realize"	Joel Piper	You Have The Roadmap / When Will I Realize
2014	"Through the Night"	Joel Piper	Through the Night
2016	"Will You Be Mine"	Joel Piper	'''TBA''' / Will You Be Mine
