= Oh Hello =

Oh Hello or Oh Hellos may refer to

- Hello, a common salutation or greeting
- The Oh, Hello Show, an American comedy act composed of John Mulaney and Nick Kroll
- The Oh Hellos, an American indie folk rock duo
