= I Was Wrong =

I Was Wrong may refer to:

- "I Was Wrong" (Social Distortion song), song by Social Distortion from their 1996 album White Light, White Heat, White Trash
- "I Was Wrong" (Celeste Buckingham and Majk Spirit song), 2013 single by Slovak singers Celeste Buckingham and Majk Spirit
- "I Was Wrong" (Chris Stapleton song), song by Chris Stapleton from his 2017 album From A Room: Volume 1
- "I Was Wrong" (The Oh Hellos song)

== See also ==
- I Was Wrong (album), an album by South Korean band 2AM, a repacked version of the mini-album Jugeodo Mot Bonae with additional tracks
