= Peril and the Patient =

Studio album by Called to Arms
- Released: August 10, 2010
- Recorded: The Basement Studios
- Genre: Progressive metal
- Length: 40:15
- Label: Tragic Hero Records
- Producer: Jamie King

Called to Arms chronology
The Last Lament (2007)	Peril and the Patient (2010)	Untitled (2013)

Peril and the Patient is the third album by the progressive metal group Called to Arms and was released digitally through Tragic Hero Records on August 10, 2010. The ninth track off the album, entitled "Ashamed, Awake", was streamed at IndieVisionMusic for the week of May 23 as well as a five-minute teaser clip from the album.

The album is based on The Screwtape Letters written by C. S. Lewis, and many of the song titles are taken directly from lines in the book.

The album was recorded and mastered with Jamie King at the Basement Studios in Winston-Salem, North Carolina.

== Track listing ==
All lyrics written by Daniel Grissom except "Ashamed, Awake" by Daniel Grissom and Lane Wood. Music written by Called to Arms.

Peril and the Patient
No.	Title	Length
1.	"Patient's Prognosis"	4:45
2.	"Safest Road to Hell"	3:42
3.	"Pleasure in the Trough"	4:26
4.	"Dead Fire in a Cold Room"	0:54
5.	"Let Sleeping Worms Lie"	4:08
6.	"Vintage Pharisee"	4:34
7.	"A Hedonist at Heart"	5:28
8.	"Our Realism, Our Rejection"	4:12
9.	"Ashamed, Awake"	4:04
10.	"Dismembered and Devoured"	4:02
Total length:		40:15

== Writing credits ==
Called to Arms

== Personnel ==
- Daniel Grissom – Vocals, keys
- Brady Sweat – Guitar
- Jamie Nickerson – Guitar
- Joshua Phillips – Bass
- Grayson Sweat – Drums
- Lane Wood – Guest vocals and lyrics on "Ashamed, Awake"

== Artwork ==
Austin Saylor

== Press and reception ==
Professional ratings
Review scores
Source	Rating
TheNewReview	4.5/5 stars
Sputnik Music	4/5 stars
IndieVisionMusic	9/10 stars
AbsolutePunk	8.7/10
ChristianMusicZine	9.3/10
CRR	9/10 stars
Spirit of Metal	9/10 stars

- The album was listed as one of the top 5 metal releases of the year by TripleW Music along with Dillinger Escape Plan, deftones, and two others.
- TheNewReview:

Peril and the Patient has without a doubt made my list of favorite albums. If you’re looking for exciting, relentless, diverse, and powerful metal then look no further. Called to Arms dishes out a stellar helping of awesome by fusing together a plethora of heavy metal subgenre, all the while keeping a varied, original and interesting sound.

- SputnikMusic:

Peril and the Patient is stunning in the way it all comes together... It's a magnificently fun, fluid, and intriguing listen that accomplishes everything it set out to achieve.

- absolutepunk.net:

Peril and the Patient is a slick listen for those with a sweet tooth for metal – easily one of the year’s best in its genre.
