= The Last Lament =

Studio album by Called To Arms
- Released: November 17, 2007
- Recorded: The Basement Studios
- Genre: Progressive metal
- Length: 27:31
- Label: Tragic Hero Records
- Producer: Jamie King

Called To Arms chronology
A New Life Given (2004)	The Last Lament (2007)	Peril and the Patient (2010)

The Last Lament is the second album by the progressive metal group Called to Arms released through Tragic Hero Records on November 17, 2007. Originally intended to be a full length in 2005, the band went on hiatus and never finished writing the rest of the record. However, when the band became active again they decided that since the disc was already nearly 30 minutes in length it had enough substance to justify releasing the material as an EP upon their return.

== Critical reception ==
Professional ratings
Review scores
Source	Rating
AbsolutePunk.net	8/10 stars
FireStream	link
HM (magazine)	3.5/5 stars
Spirit of Metal	link
Sputnik Music	link
Ultimate Metal Blog	link

- Hard Music Magazine:

The Last Lament EP is a 28-minute trip through nearly every subgenre of metal that exists. From the grindcore parts of "The Last Lament" to the southern groove of "Locked and Loaded" to the old fashioned shred parts of "The Solace," these artists are not afraid to experiment. While Called To Arms doesn't reinvent technical metal, they are quite innovative in weaving together sounds and styles no one ever expected to hear together without sounding like completely random mishmash. In fact, the songs actually sound complete through impressive musicianship and songwriting. The heavy parts are heavy with plenty of odd time signature breakdowns, speed picking and blast beats; the metalcore riffage is plenty pit-worthy, the grooves get you moving; and the shred parts will melt plenty of scenester faces. Where Called To Arms stands out most however is during the softer moments with their melodic sensibilities reminiscent of Misery Signals but with a much broader emotional spectrum. I am excited to see what these guys can express within the scope and freedom of a full length release. (3.5/5)

- AbsolutePunk.net:

...The Last Lament is not an album that has the possibility to save the metalcore genre, but how many really do? Instead, it's an album that's going to give us metalcore fans another dose of what keeps us listening. They've got pretty much everything we can appreciate: pummeling vocals, air-tight instrumentation, and a keen ear for placement and structuring...The instrumentation on this album is extremely tight and well-delivered. The guitarists can throw out some serious leads, and the songs are punctuated by some impressive soloing and scattered technical work....Called to Arms is going to be one of those bands to watch out for in the future, and while they may not ever be the saviors that this genre is looking for, it's likely that they're not going to disappoint fans of it. (7.7/10)

== Track listing ==
The Last Lament track listing
No.	Title	Length
1.	"Sixth Hour"	6:18
2.	"The Last Lament"	8:01
3.	"Revelation"	3:05
4.	"The Solace"	4:14
5.	"Locked and Loaded"	5:53
Total length:		27:31

== Writing credits ==
Called To Arms

== Personnel ==
- Daniel Grissom – Vocals, keys
- Brady Sweat – Guitar
- Jamie Nickerson – Guitar
- Joshua Phillips – Bass
- Grayson Sweat – Drums
- Zack Van Hoy – Drums while the record was written
