= Exeunt =

Exeunt (English: they leave) may refer to:

- Exeunt Magazine, spun-off theatre section of musicOMH
- A stage direction, frequently used in the plays of William Shakespeare and other Elizabethan dramatists, meaning "persons leave the stage". It is notably found at the end of many acts and plays of Shakespeare.
- A command in the Shakespeare Programming Language
- "Exeunt", a song by the Oh Hellos from the 2015 album Dear Wormwood

== See also ==
- Exeat, "he/she may leave"
