= Innocence Surround =

EP by Confide
- Released: June 2005
- Genre: Deathcore, metalcore
- Length: 20:23
- Label: Self-released

Confide chronology
Innocence Surround (2005)	Introduction (2006)

Innocence Surround is the debut release by American metalcore band Confide, released in June 2005.

== Background ==
Only one of the members of this release was still part of the band until the time of Confide's break-up, which was Jeffrey Helberg. Aside from this, Helberg and two other Confide members (William "Billy" Pruden and Aaron VanZutphen) that played on this release stayed a part of the band up until the Shout the Truth recording.

== Track listing ==
No.	Title	Length
1.	"Artax"	5:01
2.	"Talking in Riddles and Metaphors"	4:54
3.	"Dreaming a Reality"	2:41
4.	"Love Paid with Death"	3:44
5.	"Angels and Demons"	4:06

== Personnel ==
- Josh Plesh – Lead vocals
- Aaron VanZutphen – Lead guitar, clean vocals
- Jeffrey Helberg – Rhythm guitar, backing vocals
- William "Billy" Pruden – Bass
- Jason Pickard – Drums
