= Notos (album) =

EP by The Oh Hellos
- Released: 2017
- Genres: Folk rock, indie folk
- Length: 20:38
- Producers: Maggie and Tyler Heath

The Oh Hellos chronology
Dear Wormwood (2015)	Notos (2017)	Eurus (2018)

Notos is an extended play by American folk rock band The Oh Hellos, released in 2017. It is the first of four albums named after the Greek wind deities known as the Anemoi. It is named after Notos (sometimes spelt Notus), the god of the south wind.

Despite its eponymous name, and the frequent references to Greek mythology throughout, like the other albums by The Oh Hellos, it carries on the band's uniquely Christian message. Each of the Anemoi albums are designed to ask a question. The question put forward by Notos is "Where did my ideas come from?".

== Background ==
Notos was released on December 8, 2017.

Inspiration

Unlike The Oh Hello's previous albums, such as Through the Deep, Dark Valley (2012) or Dear Wormwood (2015), Notos and the rest of the Anemoi albums are not explicitly based on the writings of C.S. Lewis or Patrick Rothfuss. Instead, the albums draw heavily from Biblical ethics, sometimes using Greek pagan imagery or storylines to express this.

The Heath siblings use their music to address not only personal but societal issues, particularly through a lens shaped by their Christian values. Their work critiques destructive ideologies (e.g., extreme patriotism in "Torches") while drawing attention to the redemptive, unifying power of humility and faith.

The album combines high-energy folk instrumentation with complex lyrical themes and deep Christian influences, creating a work that is both spiritually resonant and thematically rich. The Heath siblings skillfully incorporate Scriptural references alongside broader narratives about the human experience, subtly integrating their faith as a central yet understated element in their music.

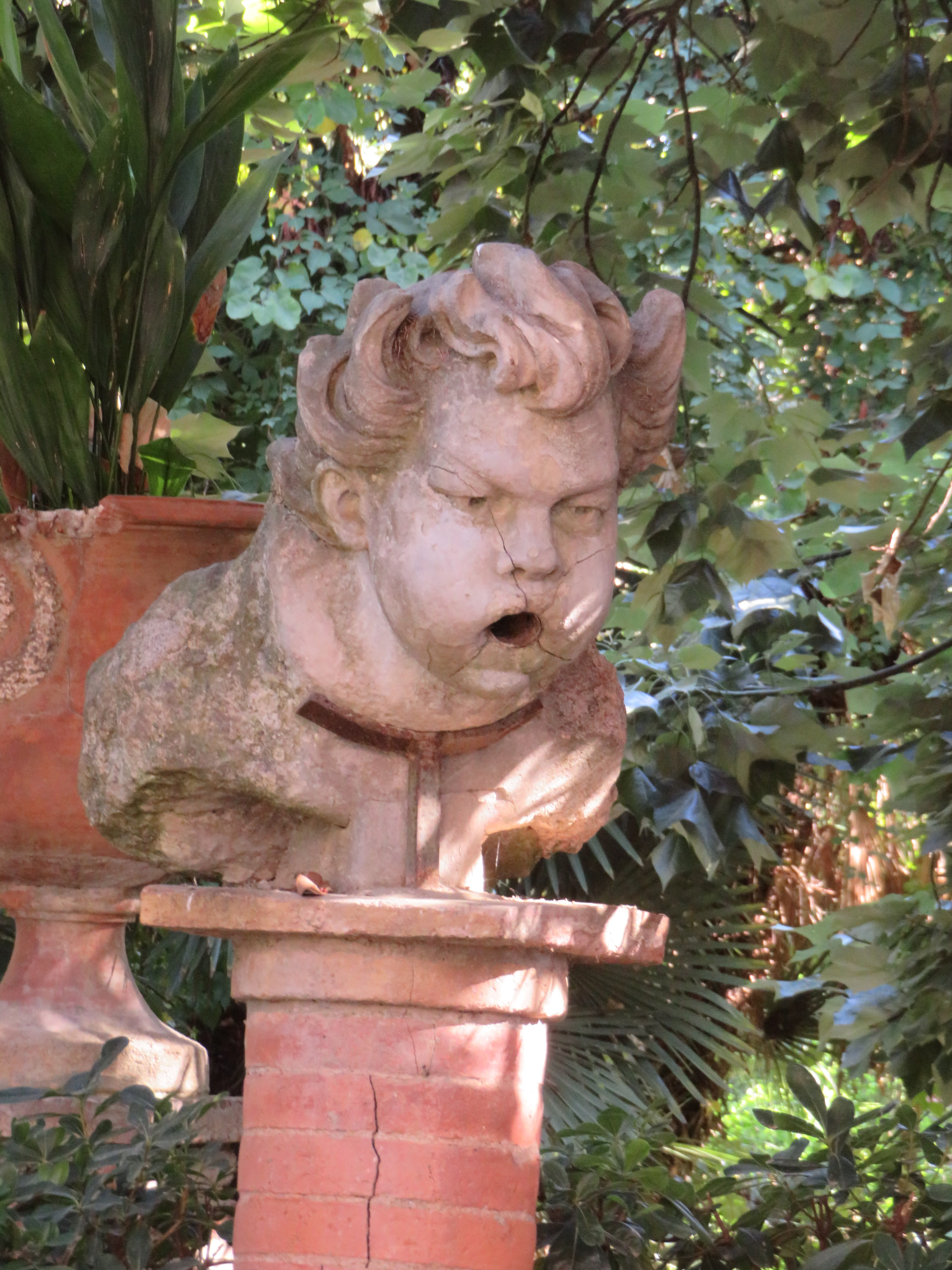
Notus, the Greek god of the South Wind

Notus in Greek Mythology

The actual figure of Notus in Greek mythology plays the role of very minor deity, even within the Anemoi. Along with the other wind deities, he is said to have been the son of the dawn goddess, Eos. He is mentioned by the writer Hesiod along with his brothers, Eurus and Zephyrus.

Notus is said to be the god of the South Wind, and is usually presented as the bringer of the storms of late summer and autumn. His equivalent in the Roman pantheon is the minor deity, Auster.

The use of pagan imagery to explain Christian ethics has been a practice since the early Christian Church, by Church fathers such as Origen of Alexandria.

== Interpretation ==
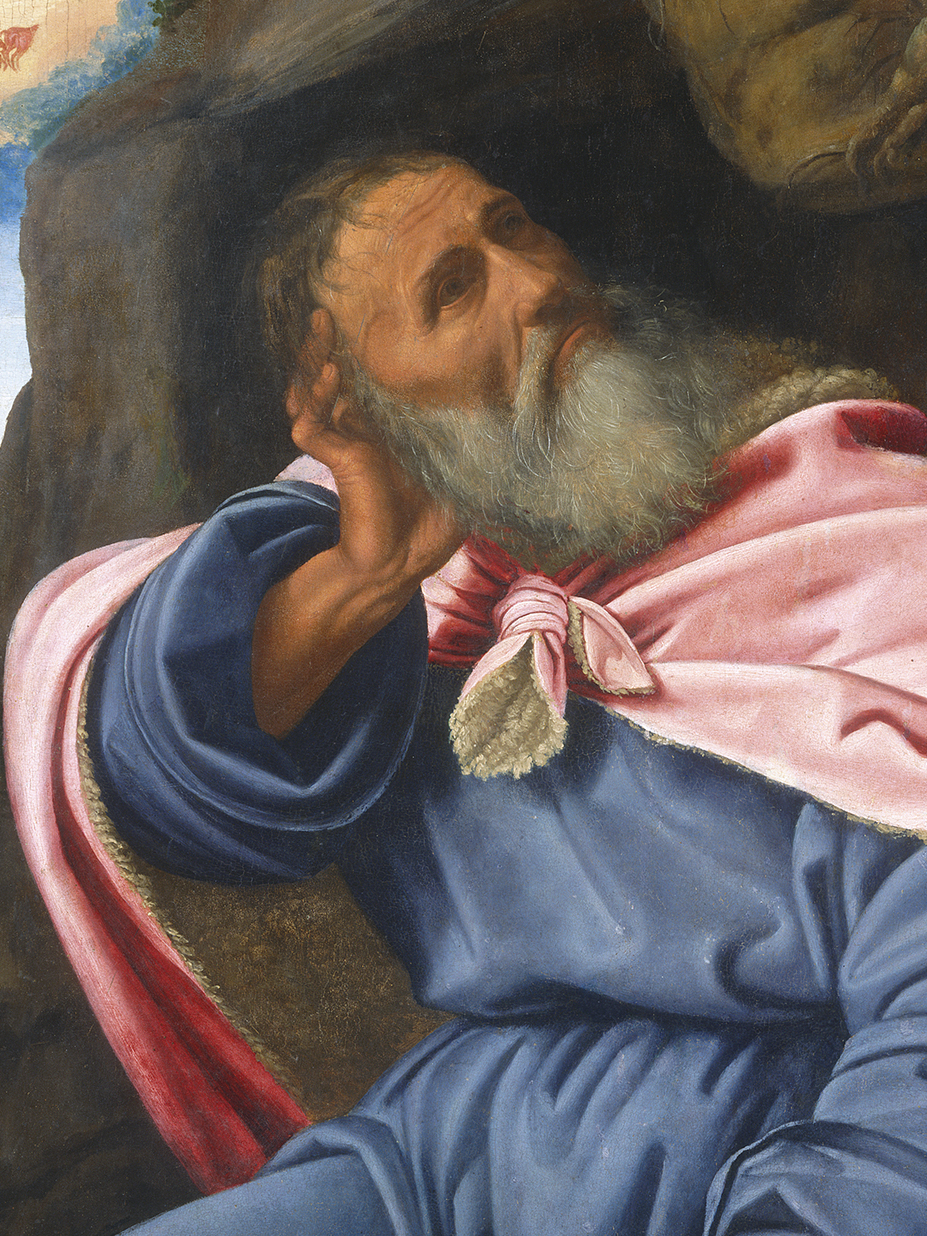
Painting of Elijah the Prophet by Giovanni Girolamo Savoldo, c. 1510

Notos takes inspiration from the biblical story of Elijah, a prophet who experienced God’s presence through a "still, small voice" rather than through grand, overwhelming forces. This is explicitly referenced in the first track, "On the Mountain Tall", where the lyrics speak of the small, quiet voice calling Elijah.

The imagery of "Torches" reflects themes of idolatry and enlightenment found in the story of Elijah. Just as Elijah’s confrontation with the prophets of Baal demonstrated the supremacy of God, the album critiques tribalism and nationalism while pointing toward humility and quiet truth as paths to resolution.

The album often uses a metaphor of a storm as a dual reflection of literal events like the Hurricane Harvey, which ravaged the band’s native Texas in Autumn 2017, and the spiritual struggles of the Prophet Elijah. The chaos of the storm echoes Elijah’s journey, where wind, fire, and earthquakes pass before him, but God’s presence is found in the calm that follows.

== Track listing ==
All tracks are written by Maggie and Tyler Heath.

Notos track listing
No.	Title	Length
1.	"On the Mountain Tall"	3:07
2.	"Torches"	3:31
3.	"Planetarium Stickers on a Bedroom Ceiling"	0:48
4.	"Constellations"	3:47
5.	"Notos"	3:19
6.	"Mandatory Evac / Counting Cars"	2:22
7.	"New River"	3:41
Total length:		20:38
