= Lumière (EP) =

Studio album by The Afterimage
- Released: August 28, 2015
- Recorded: Sundown Studios
- Genre: Progressive metal, mathcore
- Length: 27:10
- Label: Tragic Hero Records
- Producer: Jordan Valeriote

Professional ratings
Review scores
Source	Rating
Sputnik Music	(3.8/5)
New Noise Magazine	(5/5)
ItDjents	(7/10)

Lumière is an EP from Canadian metalcore band The Afterimage. The EP was released on August 28, 2015 in North America through Tragic Hero Records. It was produced by Jordan Valeriote at Sundown Studios in Guelph, Ontario and is the band's first release since their debut EP Formless in 2012.

The band took on a slightly different approach from their first EP including clean vocals that have a strong R&B and pop influence fused in with the band's progressive metal sound. Vocalist Kyle Anderson had the following to say of the band’s new music, “We started as a project that showcased technicality and precision at the heavier end of the musical spectrum. Now we’re primarily focused on creating the most captivating songs, with heavy passages used merely as one of a number of dynamics.”

== Track listing ==
No.	Title	Length
1.	"Lumière"	2:00
2.	"Seeking"	4:10
3.	"Follow"	3:25
4.	"Unseen"	4:55
5.	"Onyx"	3:58
6.	"Distance"	3:31
7.	"Without You"	1:19
8.	"Reach"	3:52
Total length:		27:10
