= Telescreen (band) =

American rock band

- Origin: Winston-Salem, North Carolina
- Genres: Progressive rock, space rock, avant-garde
- Labels: Tragic Hero Records (2008 – Present)
- Spinoff of: Codeseven
- Members: Jared Draughon; James Tuttle; Jon Tuttle; Matt Tuttle; Eric Weyer

Telescreen was an American rock band formed in Winston-Salem, North Carolina, in 2007. Following the breakup of Classic Case and Codeseven, members of the two bands created a new musical project. Taking their name from George Orwell's dystopian novel Nineteen Eighty-Four, the band combines samples and effects with progressive space rock. Their live performances featured the quintet playing behind a giant screen, which alternately featured messages and art film imagery. The lighting and projection was timed so that at certain points the band is visible behind the screen, while at others they were obscured by the images.

Telescreen released The Solar Sea in 2007 by means of a creative commons license where fans could download the music directly from the band after sending a small payment via PayPal. In September 2008, Telescreen signed to Tragic Hero Records. They also released a split 7-inch vinyl with Damn This Desert Air on Koi Records in 2008.

== Discography ==
- The Solar Sea, 2007

== Related bands ==
- Classic Case - Jared Draughon
- Codeseven - James Tuttle, Jon Tuttle, Matt Tuttle, Eric Weyer
