= All Is Calm =

Studio album by Confide
- Released: July 30, 2013
- Genre: Metalcore, post-hardcore
- Length: 40:13
- Label: Self-released
- Producer: Confide

Confide chronology
Recover (2010)	All Is Calm (2013)

Singles from All Is Calm
- 1. "Sooner or Later" Released: March 12, 2013

Professional ratings
Review scores
Source	Rating
Highlight Magazine	8/10
Indie Vision Music	4/5 stars

All Is Calm is the third, and currently final, studio album by American metalcore band Confide. The album was self-released on July 30, 2013.

== Track listing ==
No.	Title	Length
1.	"Rise Up"	3:05
2.	"Sooner or Later"	3:37
3.	"We Just Wanted Freedom"	3:09
4.	"Days Are Gone"	3:35
5.	"I Won't Let You Go"	3:07
6.	"Unhappy Together, Unhappy Alone"	3:50
7.	"Somewhere to Call Home"	3:36
8.	"Give Me a Voice (Interlude)"	3:07
9.	"Move On"	2:31
10.	"Livin' the Dream"	3:28
11.	"Time After Time"	3:07
12.	"Do You Believe Me Now?"	4:01
Total length:		40:13

== Personnel ==
- Ross Kenyon – unclean vocals
- Joshua Paul – lead guitar, backing vocals
- Jeffrey Helberg – rhythm guitar
- Trevor Vickers – bass guitar, backing vocals
- Joel Piper – drums, clean vocals, keyboards, programming
