= Codeseven =

American melodic hardcore band

- Origin: Winston-Salem, North Carolina, U.S.
- Genres: Alternative rock; emo; post-hardcore; space rock; experimental rock; nu metal (early); metalcore (early)
- Years active: 1995–2005, 2010–present
- Labels: Huel Records; The Music Cartel; Equal Vision Records
- Members: James Tuttle; Eric Weyer; Matt Tuttle; Jeff Jenkins; Jon Tuttle
- Past members: David Owen

Codeseven is a American rock band from Winston-Salem, North Carolina. Formed in 1995, their first "official" release (their actual first release was called Paper or Plastic [1996], released through a small Winston-Salem-based label called Huel Records), A Sense of Coalition (1998) gained popularity on college radio stations for a cover of Don Henley's "The Boys of Summer" (not to be confused with The Ataris' cover of the same song that became a mainstream radio hit years later).

With the milestone release, Division of Labor (1999), Codeseven found themselves at the forefront of the hardcore movement. With the departure of singer David Owen, they released The Rescue (2002). This album saw the band becoming less aggressive and more melodic, largely abandoning their hardcore roots in favor of progressive, experimental space rock as Cave In had done. Their final album, Dancing Echoes/Dead Sounds, was released in 2004 on Equal Vision Records. The following year the band broke up in order to pursue different opportunities.

It was announced on July 1, 2010, that Codeseven would be playing a reunion show on August 20, 2010, at Greene Street Club in Greensboro, NC. Following an overwhelmingly positive response, it was decided that they would continue to tour. On August 2, 2010, it was announced the band would support Circa Survive alongside Dredg and Animals as Leaders on a tour starting October 15, 2010.

The set at their reunion show on August 20, 2010, featured songs from all four of their most recent albums including 6 songs with original 2nd vocalist Dave Owen. Many of these songs had not been played in close to 10 years. The set closed with their cover of Don Henley's "The Boys of Summer."

In October 2023, the band announced a new single titled "Hold Tight" off of their newly announced upcoming record titled Go Let It In set to release December 1, 2023, via Equal Vision Records. "Hold Tight" was released with a subsequent video supporting the release.

November 30, 2023, the day before the release of the record, a second single "Rough Seas" was released with a supporting video. Go Let It In was released on December 1.

On May 03, 2024 they embarked on a US tour in support of He Is Legend's 20 year anniversary tour for their 2004 album I Am Hollywood.

== Discography ==
- Paper or Plastic (Huel Records, 1996)
- A Sense of Coalition (The Music Cartel, 1998)
- Division of Labor (1999)
- The Rescue (The Music Cartel, 2002)
- Dancing Echoes/Dead Sounds (Equal Vision Records, 2004)
- Go Let It In (Equal Vision Records, 2023)

== Related bands ==
- Adair – Matt Tuttle
- Telescreen – James Tuttle, Jon Tuttle, Matt Tuttle, Eric Weyer
- Sundrone – Jeff Jenkins
- Red Orchestra Radio – James Tuttle
- 18 Wheels of Pain – Dave Owen
- Echo Crush – James Tuttle
- Small Planes – Matt Tuttle
