= The Screwtape Letters =

1942 Christian apologetic novel by C. S. Lewis

- First edition dust wrapper
- Author: C. S. Lewis
- Language: English
- Genre: Epistolary novel, Christian apologetics, satire
- Publisher: Geoffrey Bles
- Publication date: 1942; 1961 (first omnibus)
- Publication place: United Kingdom
- Media type: Print (hardcover and paperback)
- Pages: 160 (1st); 157 (1st omnibus)
- OCLC: 3485336
- LC Class: BR125
- Followed by: "Screwtape Proposes a Toast"
- Text: The Screwtape Letters online

The Screwtape Letters is a Christian apologetic novel by C. S. Lewis and dedicated to J. R. R. Tolkien. It is written in a satirical, epistolary style and, while it is fictional in format, the plot and characters are used to address Christian theological issues, primarily those to do with temptation and resistance to it.

First published in February 1942, the story takes the form of a series of letters from a senior devil, Screwtape, to his nephew, Wormwood, a junior tempter. The uncle's mentorship pertains to the nephew's responsibility in securing the damnation of a British man known only as "the Patient".

By 1999, the novel had 26 English and 15 German editions, with around half a million copies sold.

== Summary ==
In The Screwtape Letters, Lewis imagines a series of lessons on the importance of taking a deliberate role in Christian faith by portraying a typical human life, with all its temptations and failings, seen from devils' viewpoints. Screwtape holds an administrative post in the bureaucracy ("Lowerarchy") of Hell. Until the book's final pages, Screwtape acts as a mentor to his nephew Wormwood, an inexperienced and incompetent tempter.

In the 31 letters which compose the book, Screwtape gives Wormwood detailed advice on various methods of undermining God's words and of promoting abandonment of God in "the Patient" (whom Wormwood is tempting), interspersed with observations on human nature and the Bible. In Screwtape's advice, selfish gain and power are seen as the only good, and neither devil can comprehend God's love for man or acknowledge human virtue.

Versions of the letters were originally published weekly in the Anglican periodical The Guardian during wartime, from May to November 1941. The book adds an introduction explaining how the author chose to write his story.

Lewis wrote a sequel, "Screwtape Proposes a Toast", in 1959. The satirical essay criticizes trends in British society, education, and public attitudes. The essay was included, with a new preface by Lewis, in editions of The Screwtape Letters published by Bles in 1961 and by Macmillan in 1962.

The Screwtape Letters became one of Lewis' most popular works, although he said it was "not fun" to write and "resolved never to write another 'Letter'".

Both "The Screwtape Letters" and "Screwtape Proposes a Toast" were released on audio cassette and CD, with narrations by John Cleese, Joss Ackland, and Ralph Cosham. Cleese's recording was a Grammy Awards Finalist for Best Spoken Word.

== Plot overview ==
The Screwtape Letters consists of 31 letters written by a senior devil named Screwtape to his nephew, Wormwood (named after a star in the Book of Revelation), a younger and less experienced devil, charged with guiding a man called "the Patient" toward "Our Father Below" (Satan), and away from "the Enemy" (God).

After the first letter, the Patient converts to Christianity, and Wormwood is chastised for allowing this. A striking contrast is formed between Wormwood and Screwtape during the rest of the book, wherein Wormwood is depicted through Screwtape's letters as anxious to tempt his patient into extravagantly wicked and deplorable sins, often recklessly, while Screwtape takes a more subtle stance, as in Letter XII, wherein he remarks: "... the safest road to hell is the gradual one – the gentle slope, soft underfoot, without sudden turnings, without milestones, without signposts."

In Letter VIII, Screwtape explains to his protégé the different purposes that God and the devils have for the human race: "We want cattle who can finally become food; He wants servants who can finally become sons." With this end in mind, Screwtape urges Wormwood in Letter VI to promote passivity and irresponsibility in the Patient: "(God) wants men to be concerned with what they do; our business is to keep them thinking about what will happen to them."

With his own views on theology, Lewis goes on to describe and discuss sex, love, pride, gluttony, and war in successive letters. Lewis, an Oxford and Cambridge scholar himself, suggests in his work that even intellectuals are not impervious to the influence of such devils, especially during complacent acceptance of the "Historical Point of View" (Letter XXVII).

In Letter XXII, after several attempts to find a licentious woman for the Patient "to promote a useful marriage", and after Screwtape's narrowly avoiding a painful punishment for having divulged to Wormwood God's genuine love for humanity (about which Wormwood had promptly informed the Infernal authorities), Screwtape notes that the Patient has fallen in love with a Christian girl, and through her and her family, had adopted a very Christian way of life. Toward the end of this letter, in his anger, Screwtape becomes a large centipede, mimicking a similar transformation in Book X of Paradise Lost, wherein the devils are changed into snakes. Later in the correspondence, it is revealed that the young man may be placed in harm's way by his possible civil defence duties (it is stated in an earlier letter that he is eligible for military service, but it is never actually confirmed that he was indeed called). While Wormwood is delighted with this and by the Second World War in general, Screwtape admonishes Wormwood to keep the Patient safe in hopes that they can compromise his faith over a long lifetime.

In the last letter, the Patient has been killed during the Blitz and has gone to Heaven, and for his ultimate failure, Wormwood is doomed to suffer the consumption of his spiritual essence by the other devils, especially by Screwtape himself. He responds to Wormwood's final letter by saying that he may expect as little assistance as Screwtape would expect from Wormwood were their situations reversed ("My love for you and your love for me are as alike as two peas ... The difference is that I am the stronger"), mimicking the situation where Wormwood himself reported his uncle to the Infernal Police for Infernal Heresy (making a religiously positive remark that would offend Satan).

Screwtape starts every letter with "My dear Wormwood", except the last letter, which sarcastically says, "My dear, my very dear Wormwood; my poppet, my pigsnie."

== Literary sequels ==
=== "Screwtape Proposes a Toast" ===
The short sequel "Screwtape Proposes a Toast" (1959), first published as an article in The Saturday Evening Post, is an addendum to The Screwtape Letters; the two works are often published together as one book. The sequel takes the form of an after-dinner speech given by Screwtape at the Tempters' Training College for young devils. In stage adaptations it is sometimes added as a prelude, making the work a prequel. "Screwtape Proposes a Toast" is Lewis' criticism of leveling and featherbedding trends in public education; more specifically, as he reveals in the foreword to the American edition, public education in America (though in the text, it is English education that is held up as the purportedly awful example).

The Cold War opposition between the West and the Communist World is explicitly discussed as a backdrop to the educational issues. Screwtape and other devils are portrayed as consciously using the subversion of education and intellectual thought in the West to bring about its overthrow by the communist enemy from without and within. In this sense "Screwtape Proposes a Toast" is more strongly political than The Screwtape Letters, wherein no strong stand is made on political issues of the day, such as World War II.

=== Other literary sequels ===
Though C. S. Lewis had resolved not to write another letter, and only revisited the character of Screwtape once, in "Screwtape Proposes a Toast", the format, referred to by Lewis himself as a kind of "diabolical ventriloquism", has inspired other authors to prepare sequels or similar works, such as:

- Breig, Joseph A. (1952). The Devil You Say.
- Martin, Walter R. (1975). Screwtape Writes Again. Vision House. ISBN 978-0-88449-033-3.
- Kreeft, Peter (1998). The Snakebite Letters: Devilishly Devious Secrets for Subverting Society as Taught in Tempter's Training School. Ignatius Press. ISBN 978-0-89870-721-2.
- Alcorn, Randy (2001). Lord Foulgrin's Letters. Crown Publishing. ISBN 978-1-57673-861-0.
- Bryan Miles (2003). The Wormwood Letters. iUniverse. ISBN 978-0-595-28392-7. Wormwood, who has somehow survived, now finds himself in a new era writing to his own nephew, Soulsniper.
- Fejfar, Antony J. (2004). The Screwtape Emails: An Allegory.
- Forest, Jim (2004). The Wormwood File: E-mail From Hell. Orbis Books. ISBN 978-1-57075-554-5. Another Wormwood series of instructions.
- Laymon, Barbara (2004). The Devil's Inbox. Augsburg Books. ISBN 978-0-8066-4945-0.
- Williams, Arthur H. Jr. (2006). The Screwtape Email. Trafford. ISBN 978-1-4120-0067-3.
- Longenecker, Dwight (2009). The Gargoyle Code: Lenten Letters between a Master Tempter and his diabolical Trainee. ISBN 978-0-615-67385-1. Master Tempter Slubgrip advises Dogwart how to corrupt a young Catholic, while struggling to control his own 'patient.'
- Peschke, Jim (2010). The Michael Letters: Heaven's answer to Screwtape. CreateSpace Independent Publishing Platform. ISBN 978-1-4536-6027-0. The Archangel Michael provides advice to Jacob, a guardian angel.
- Platt, Richard (2012). As One Devil to Another: A Fiendish Correspondence in the Tradition of C. S. Lewis' The Screwtape Letters. Tyndale House Publishers. ISBN 978-1-4143-7166-5.
- Andrews, Pat. (2014). E-mails from Hell: An Homage and Update to C.S. Lewis.
- Deace, Steve. (2016). A Nefarious Plot. Simon and Schuster. ISBN 978-1-61868-823-1.
- Aldridge, R.J. (2019). The Wormwood Emails: Inside Tips on Avoiding Hell.
- Cyprus, J.B. (2022). Letters to Bentrock: A Demon's Guide To Trapping Prey. Wolfpack Publishing LLC. ISBN 978-1-63977-278-0. The tempters are working in a Texas prison to keep The Inmate on the wide and easy road to their home below.

== Adaptations ==
=== Stage adaptations ===
The stage play Dear Wormwood (later renamed Screwtape), written by James Forsyth, was published in 1961. The setting is changed to wartime London, where we actually see Wormwood going about the business of tempting his "patient" (in the play, given the name "Michael Green"). The ending is changed as well, with Wormwood trying to repent and beg for forgiveness, when it appears that his mission has failed. Dear Wormwood premiered in Luther High School North, Chicago in April 1961.

Philadelphia playwright and actor Anthony Lawton's original adaptation of The Screwtape Letters has been staged several times since 2000 by Lantern Theater Company, most recently in May/June 2014. In Lawton's adaptation, each of Screwtape's letters is punctuated by varied dances including tap, Latin ballroom, jazz, martial arts, and rock – and whips and fire-eating. Screwtape performs these dances with his secretary, Toadpipe.

The Fellowship for the Performing Arts obtained from the Lewis estate the rights to adapt The Screwtape Letters for the stage. The initial production opened off-off-Broadway at Theatre 315 in New York City in January 2006. The initial three-week run was extended to eleven and finally closed because the theater was contractually obligated to another production. It was co-written by Max McLean (who also starred) and Jeffrey Fiske (who also directed). In this production, there are two characters - Screwtape and Toadpipe; the latter is played by a female. A second, expanded production opened off-Broadway at the Theatre at St. Clements on 18 October 2007, originally scheduled to run through 6 January 2008. The production re-opened at the Mercury Theater in Chicago in September 2008, and continued on a national tour including San Francisco, Phoenix, Louisville, Chattanooga, Fort Lauderdale, Houston and Austin, through January 2010 as well as playing at The Shakespeare Theatre in Washington, D.C. for ten weeks. The Screwtape Letters played for 309 performances at New York City's Westside Theatre in 2010. The 2011 tour visited performing arts venues in cities throughout the United States including Los Angeles, Houston, Dallas, Atlanta, Seattle, Minneapolis, and Boston. The 2012–2013 tour began in Los Angeles in January 2012, with return engagements in San Francisco, San Diego, Seattle, Chicago and Atlanta as well as stops in several other cities. The Screwtape Letters has been described as "Humorous and lively ... the Devil has rarely been given his due more perceptively!" by The New York Times, "A profound experience" by Christianity Today and "Wickedly witty ... One hell of a good show!" by The Wall Street Journal. The production has also toured worldwide.

In some productions, the role of Screwtape has been performed by a woman.

The Barley Sheaf Players of Lionville, Pennsylvania performed James Forsyth's play Screwtape in September 2010. It was directed by Scott Ryan and the play ran the last three weekends in September. The production was reviewed by Paul Recupero for Stage Magazine.

=== Comic book adaptation ===
Marvel Comics and religious book publisher Thomas Nelson produced a comic book adaptation of The Screwtape Letters in 1994.

=== Audio drama ===
Focus on the Family Radio Theatre was granted the rights to dramatize The Screwtape Letters as a feature-length audio drama. Production began in 2008, and the product was released in the fall of 2009. Andy Serkis, known for playing Gollum in The Lord of the Rings film trilogy, provided the voice for Screwtape, with Bertie Carvel as Wormwood, Philip Bird as The Patient (identified in this production as "John Hamilton"), Laura Michelle Kelly as The Girl (identified in this production as "Dorothy"), Roger Hammond as Toadpipe, Christina Greatrex as Slumtrimpet, Janet Henfrey as Glubose, Eileen Page as John Hamilton's mother, Susie Brann as Viv Brett, Robert Benfield as Noel Brett, and Geoffrey Palmer as C.S. Lewis. There is a 7-and-a-half minute video preview of the Radio Theatre production with interviews and making-of footage. This production was a 2010 Audie Awards finalist.

=== Annotated Screwtape Letters ===
An annotated edition of The Screwtape Letters was released in 2013 by HarperOne. Paul McCusker, who adapted the book for Focus on the Family's audio drama, wrote the footnotes. McCusker does not provide any theological commentary or interpretation, but instead clarifies vocabulary, literary passages and customs which might not be immediately clear to the modern reader. He also cross-references passages to Lewis' other works dealing with particular subjects.

== In popular culture ==
=== Comics ===
In Calvin and Hobbes, Bill Watterson named Miss Wormwood (Calvin's elementary school teacher) after Lewis' apprentice devil.

=== Documentary ===
Affectionately Yours, Screwtape: The Devil and C.S. Lewis (1 January 2007), directed by Tom Dallis and written by Amy Dallis, aired on the History Channel.

=== Literature ===
In 2010, the Marine Corps Gazette began publishing a series of articles entitled "The Attritionist Letters" styled in the manner of The Screwtape Letters. In the letters, General Screwtape chastises Captain Wormwood for his inexperience and naivete while denouncing the concepts of maneuver warfare in favor of attrition warfare.

Writer David Foster Wallace praised the book in interviews and placed it first on his list of top ten favorite books.

=== Music ===
Called to Arms' concept album Peril and the Patient (10 August 2010) is based entirely on The Screwtape Letters.

In U2's music video for the song "Hold Me, Thrill Me, Kiss Me, Kill Me" (1995), an animated Bono is seen walking down the street holding the book The Screwtape Letters. While on stage during the Zoo TV Tour Bono would dress as Mr. MacPhisto, his alter ego. Bono would wear a gold suit and devil horns and usually make prank calls to politicians.

The lyrics for The Receiving End of Sirens' song "Oubliette (Disappear)", from the album The Earth Sings Mi Fa Mi (2007), were inspired by a passage from The Screwtape Letters.

In the Christian metal band Living Sacrifice's album Ghost Thief, there is a track titled "Screwtape". Frontman Bruce Fitzhugh explained that the song is "about temptation and the proverbial 'devil on your shoulder.' It's about the thought process we go through to justify a thought or action that is not good for the soul". Fitzhugh also explains how he thought it was interesting Lewis wrote from the perspective of Screwtape and that he wrote from the same perspective in the song.

The group The Oh Hellos released the album Dear Wormwood, which they have described as a form of speculative fiction from the point of view of "the patient".

The three-part song "Salt (in the Wounds) of the Earth" on the 2021 album Laysongs by mandolinist Chris Thile was inspired by The Screwtape Letters.

David Bazan references the book in the lyrics of the title track of the 2024 Pedro the Lion album Santa Cruz.

=== Political discourse ===
President of the United States Ronald Reagan quoted from The Screwtape Letters in his 1983 speech to the National Association of Evangelicals.

Antonin Scalia, an Associate Justice of the Supreme Court of the United States appointed by Reagan, had professed his admiration for the book. In a 2013 interview with New York magazine, Scalia remarked: "The Screwtape Letters is a great book. It really is, just as a study of human nature." The book was mentioned in the highly publicized interview during Scalia's discourse regarding the nature of his Catholic faith.

== Bibliography ==
- Lancelyn Green, Roger; Hooper, Walter (2002), C. S. Lewis: a biography, London: HarperCollins, ISBN 0-00-628164-8.
