= The Afterimage =

Canadian progressive metalcore band

- Origin: Barrie, Ontario, Canada
- Genres: Progressive metalcore; mathcore; progressive rock; post-hardcore
- Years active: 2011–2018
- Labels: Tragic Hero Records; Famined Records; Ghost Music; Royal Division Entertainment
- Spinoffs: Brand of Sacrifice
- Past members: Kyle Anderson; Michael Leo Valeri; Liam Beeson; Dallas Bricker; Rob Zalischi; Alex Lappano; Mike Ticar; Nick McCaslin; Sam Jacobs; Asher Ally; Andrew Wilson
- Website: Afterimage The Afterimage on Facebook

The Afterimage was a Canadian progressive metalcore band from Barrie, Ontario. The band formed in 2011 with members from local bands such as Centuries Apart and The Prologue vocalist Kyle Anderson, guitarists Alex Lappano and Mike Ticar, drummer Nick McCaslin, and bassist Dallas Bricker.

== History ==
=== Formless ===
On May 24, 2012, The Afterimage released their debut single titled "Void" from their first EP Formless which was released in North America through Famined Records on August 14, 2012, and Ghost Music in the UK. This EP was received very well as it showcased the band's creativity and talent in four tracks.

Following the release of Formless, The Afterimage hit the road and spent August 2012 touring Eastern Canada with Ascariasis and Stormwalker. It was on this tour that the band met Ascariasis guitarist Michael Leo Valeri, who would join the band the following year. The band was able to land a slot at the KOI Music Festival in Kitchener, Ontario in September. From October 20-November 5 the band went on another Canadian tour, this time with labelmates Three Crowns. Famined then released a free 4th of July Summer Sampler, with songs from the two bands.

In 2012, the band released a single with a slight change in sound titled "The Seeking" and followed with two more singles in 2013: "Pathogen" and "The Unseen". The Afterimage toured across Canada in 2013 with Beheading of a King and Take the Earth Beneath Us from February 21 to March 16.

The Afterimage then signed with Royal Division Entertainment and released the single "O N Y X" on April 13, 2014.

=== Lumière ===
On August 28, 2015, The Afterimage released their eight-track EP Lumière through Tragic Hero Records. The band's new song "Reach" was featured on Guitar World with a play-through video. During September 4–20, The Afterimage toured with ERRA, Polyphia, and Invent, Animate. The new EP was engineered by Valeriote at Sundown Studios and Nick Sampson at Metro 37 Studios and mixed and mastered by Kris Crummett at Interlace Audio.

=== Eve ===
In May 2018, The Afterimage released their debut album, Eve. In June, they headlined a 10-band concert in Ottawa.

=== Breakup ===
The band announced their break-up via social media on September 22, 2018. It was later revealed that they were no longer with Tragic Hero, and had rebranded to become the technical deathcore act Brand of Sacrifice.

== Style ==
The Afterimage incorporated elements of melody, chaos, technicality, and groove in their music. They had extremely detailed guitar riffs and technical breakdowns and pleasant-sounding bridges that created their distinct brand of metalcore. Their use of clean vocals is apparent on nearly every track on Lumière. The Afterimage was influenced by Meshuggah, The Tony Danza Tapdance Extravaganza, Dance Gavin Dance, The 1975 and Tesseract.

== Discography ==
=== Singles ===
- The Seeking (2012)
- Pathogen (2013)
- Unseen (2013)
- O N Y X (2014)
- Pursue (2017)
- Cerulean (2018)

=== Albums ===
2012	Formless (EP): Released: August 14, 2012; Label: Famined Records (NA) Ghost Music (UK)
2015	Lumière (EP): Released: August 28, 2015; Label: Tragic Hero Records
2018	Eve: Release Date: May 18, 2018; Label: Tragic Hero Records

== Band members ==
Final lineup

- Kyle Anderson – vocals (2012–2018)
- Michael Leo Valeri – guitars (2013–2015, 2018)
- Liam Beeson – guitars (2017–2018)
- Dallas Bricker– bass guitar (2012–2018)
- Robert Zalischi – drums (2013–2018)

Former

- Asher Ally – guitars (2016–2018)
- Samuel Jacobs – guitars (2013–2015)
- Alex Lappano – guitars (2012–2013)
- Michael Ticar – guitars (2012–2013)
- Andrew Wilson – guitars (2013–2013)
- Nick McCaslin – drums (2012–2013)
