= Boxbomb =

- Origin: Chapel Hill/Durham, North Carolina, North Carolina, United States
- Years active: 2003-2009
- Labels: Future Tense Records (2006-2007); Tragic Hero Records (2007-2012)
- Members: Ryan Gustafson; Rob Mcfarlane; Justin Holder; Rosean Frank-Alexander

Boxbomb was a rock band based in Central North Carolina. Its members have never changed and include Ryan Gustafson (vocals and guitar), Rob Mcfarlane (guitar), Justin Holder (drums), and Rosean Frank-Alexander (bass). The group formed in the spring of 2003 and has resided in Chapel Hill and Durham since that time. In the summer of 2005, Boxbomb self-released the Golden EP. In 2006 Boxbomb signed to Future Tense Records and began recording their first full length at Warrior Studios in Chapel Hill. After completing the album, the band had to look for a new label, as Future Tense had shut its doors before the album (then unnamed) was ever released. In the fall of 2007, Boxbomb signed to Tragic Hero / East West Records and released My Obsession on February 5, 2008.

My Obsession received moderate to good reviews, including 3.5 out of 4 stars in Alternative Press magazine. In the late summer of 2008 the band began recording a new EP with Matt Tuttle from Telescreen (Telescreen signed to Tragic Hero Records around the same time as the recording). The band plans to release the EP, titled Run Rabbit Run (Tragic Hero Records) in early 2009.

Both Ryan Gustafson and Rob McFarlane have recorded solo material, but neither has released any of it. Both of them also play in a collective known as The Sundowners, which features members of Roman Candle, Max Indian, and The Old Ceremony, as well as singer-songwriter Josh Moore. In The Sundowners, Ryan performs under the name Roscoe Sundowner, and Rob performs as Nightman.

== Discography ==
- Golden EP (2005)
- My Obsession (2008, Tragic Hero / East West Records)
- Run Rabbit Run EP (2009, Tragic Hero / East West Records)

== Reviews ==
INDY Weekly

News & Observer

YES! Weekly
