= Introduction (Confide EP) =

EP by Confide
- Released: August 2006
- Genre: Deathcore, metalcore
- Length: 18:51
- Label: Self-released
- Producer: Kevin Penner

Confide chronology
Innocence Surround (2005)	Introduction (2006)	Shout the Truth (2008)

Professional ratings
Review scores
Source	Rating
Jesus Freak Hideout	4/5 stars

Introduction is the second extended play by American metalcore band Confide, released in August 2006.

== Background ==
This is the last album featuring founding vocalist, Josh Plesh and is also the only album to include drummer John Paul Penton who as well left the band after this release.

Confide went on to recruit former members, lead vocalist, Ross Kenyon and drummer Arin Ilejay by the recording for their follow-up release, Shout the Truth which features a metalcore sound rather than the deathcore style the band initially performed on their first two releases.

== Track listing ==
No.	Title	Length
1.	"Dead Letter"	3:23
2.	"Too Many Grasshoppers to Maintain the Harvest"	2:29
3.	"The Architect"	5:06
4.	"The Difference Between a Whisper and a Scream"	4:00
5.	"In Reference to Something Greater"	3:55

== Personnel ==
- Josh Plesh – vocals
- Jeffrey Helberg – guitar
- Aaron Richard Van Zuthpen – guitar
- William 'Billy' Pruden – bass
- John Paul Penton – drums
