= The Body Rampant =

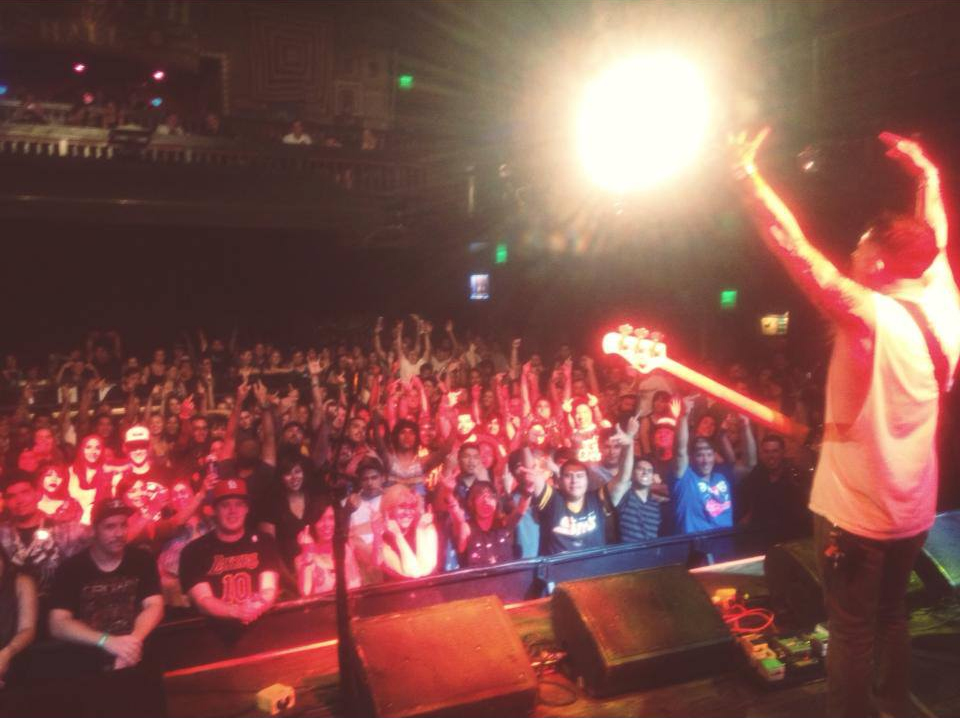
- The Body Rampant at House Of Blues OC

Background information
- Origin: Los Angeles, California, United States
- Genres: Post-hardcore; experimental rock
- Years active: 2010–2018
- Website: http://www.thebodyrampant.com

The Body Rampant was an American rock band originating in Los Angeles, CA. Formed in 2010, they released two full length studio albums and an EP produced by Casey Bates. and

== Background ==
Much of their popularity comes from their masks created by artist Duane Flatmo and their progressive rock sound which has landed them several years at SXSW. The group has been featured in publications like Kerrang!, Big Cheese (magazine), and was called 'brilliant' by Rocksound. Their music video for 'Sativa' premiered on MTV.

== History ==
=== Formation and Transient Years (2010–2011) ===
After Lopez's previous band Every Bridge Burned (Rise Records) disbanded, he quickly found himself in the studio recording new songs with producer Casey Bates. He moved to Los Angeles, CA from the rural area of Humboldt County, CA and began putting together the collective. Months later the members were solidified and the group headed back to Johnny Cab Studios in Seattle, WA to finish the 'Transient Years' EP with Casey. Armed with some creepy avant-garde masks and a fresh new EP, the band was poised to play as many shows possible with bands like Letlive, Unlocking the Truth, No Bragging Rights, and many more. Alternative Press stated "The band are determined to make a name for themselves because of their heavy pop music, not their looks."

=== Line-up changes and Midnight Mayfair (2013) ===
Several member changes later, Lopez and crew embarked to Baltimore, MD to record their debut full-length album with Producer Brian McTernan. The album was written and recorded in one month, and released several months later through Antique Records. It was noted that they had a tumultuous time in the studio writing the record. Several music critics like Music Week and Virgin Music reviewed the album. The 4/5 review from Stereoboard noted "Midnight Mayfair is one of those albums that you’ll remember for a long time, and it is set to be the start of a successful career for the Los Angeles-based quintet."

== Collaborations ==
The group has collaborated with many notable musicians; mainly Todd Weinstock (Glassjaw) and Thomas Pridgen. (The Mars Volta)
It was announced that Lopez co-wrote the self-titled album by Being As An Ocean which was released June 30, 2015 and reached #2 on the Billboard Heatseekers Chart.

== Discography ==
Full Length

| Year | Album | Label |
|---|---|---|
| 2013 | Midnight Mayfair (LP) | Independent |

| Year | Album | Label |
|---|---|---|
| 2018 | RMPNT (LP) | Independent |

EP

| Year | Album | Label |
|---|---|---|
| 2011 | Transient Years (EP) | Independent |

=== Videography ===
- Sativa (directed by Daniel Chesnut) (2011)
- Seabrinx (directed by Scott Hansen) (2012)
