= Pathways (band) =

American band

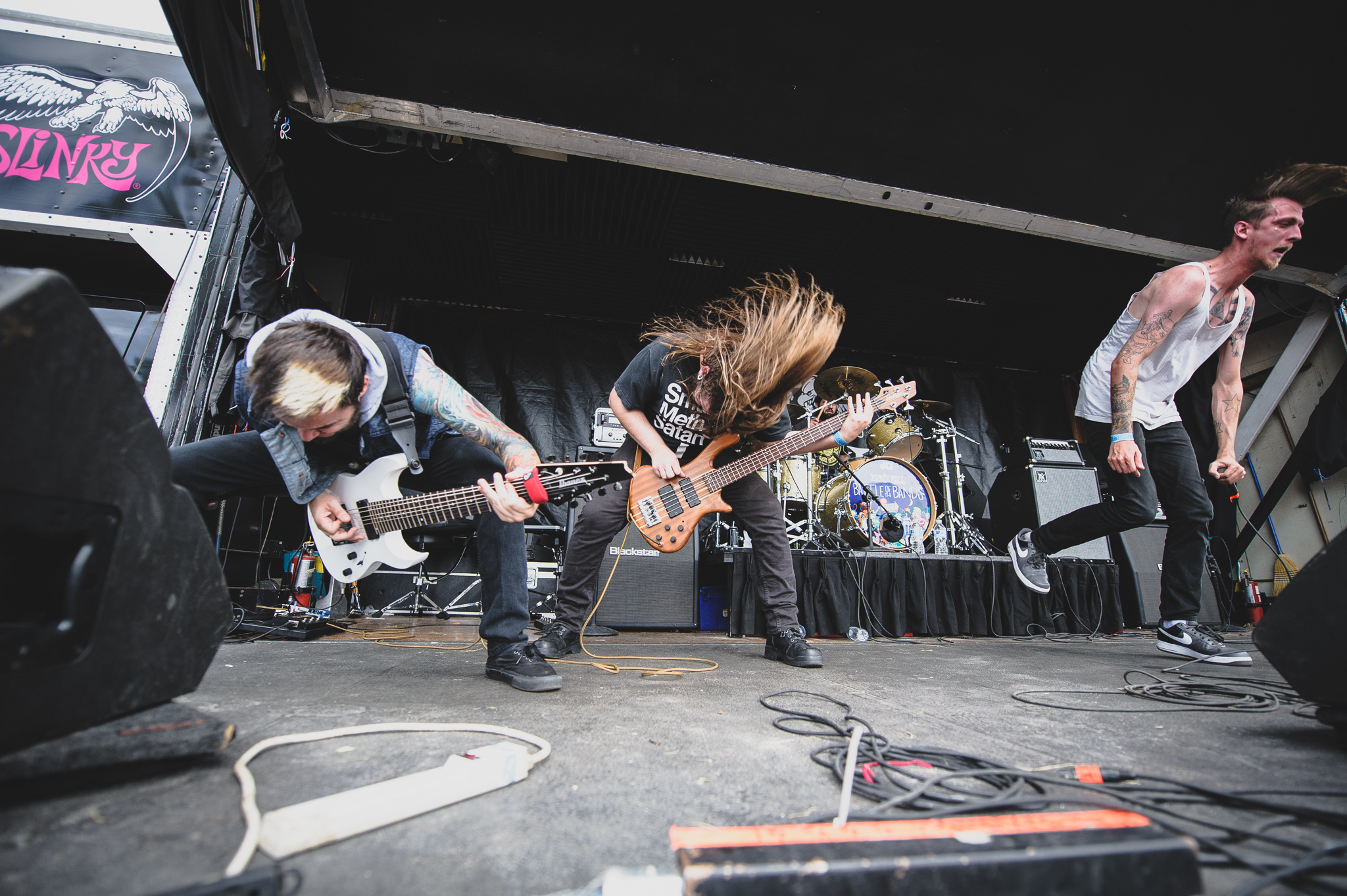

Background information
- Origin: Ft.Lauderdale, Florida, U.S.
- Genres: Progressive metalcore, neoclassical metal
- Label: Tragic Hero Records
- Members: Jon Rose; Caner Gökeri; Wil Lanagan; Kyle Miller
- Past members: Nicholas Scott; Liz Darling; Lee Metzger; Jentzen Flaskerud

Pathways is an American progressive metalcore band from Seattle, Washington. The group was signed to Tragic Hero Records and released their EP, "Dies Irae" (2016) through the label. In 2021, they released a new single, "Great Old Ones"

The band is known for their use of dual 8 string guitars and strong classical influences.

== Members ==
=== Current members ===
- Jon Rose – guitar (2012–present)
- Caner Gökeri – vocals (2020–present)
- Wil Lanagan – drums (2015–present)
- Kyle Miller – bass (2020–present)

=== Former members ===
- Nicholas Scott – scream vocals (2014–2017)
- Liz Darling – bass (2014–2017)
- Lee Metzger – drums (2012–2016)
- Jentzen Flaskerud – guitar, bass (2012–2020)

== Discography ==
=== EPs ===
Year	Album details	Label
2012	Unconscious Lives	-
2014	Harlot	-
2016	Dies Irae	Tragic Hero Records

=== Singles ===
Year	Song	Album
2013	"Arise"	-
2014	"Xmas Time"	-
2016	"Miserae"	Dies Irae
2021	"Great Old Ones"	-
2021	"Exposed"	-
2022	"Carousel"	-

=== Music video ===
Year	Title	Director	Album
2016	"Miserae"	Bobby Keegan of Afflux Studios	Dies Irae
2021	"Great Old Ones"	Karl Whinnery of Hotkarlproductions	-
