= Underneath the Gun =

American Christian deathcore/metalcore band

- Also known as: UTG
- Origin: Corona, California, U.S.
- Genres: Metalcore, deathcore
- Years active: 2004–2009, 2023–present
- Labels: Ferret Music, This City is Burning
- Members: Harrison Degrote; Trevor Vickers; Brandon Trahan
- Past members: Danny; Jake Foust; Ryan Alipour; Scotty Chappel; Kyle Simms; Josh Patterson; Isaac Bueno; Justin Osterhoudt

Underneath the Gun is a Christian deathcore and metalcore band from Corona, California. While their sound originally was deathcore on the first EP and The Awakening full length, they evolved into a melodic metalcore sound on the Forfeit Misfortunes album before disbanding due to vocalist Harrison DeGrote's health problems.

== History ==
Underneath the Gun started in 2004 when the members were 12 years old. In 2006, the band released their debut EP, You Prepare The Bodies, I'll Get The Ice, via This City is Burning Records. Months later, the band released The Awakening, their debut album. In 2008, the band signed to Ferret Music, who re-released The Awakening as an EP. Underneath the Gun released their second album, Forfeit Misfortunes, again through Ferret. The album was recorded by Tim Lambesis of As I Lay Dying. The band had played with bands such as Job for a Cowboy, A Life Once Lost, August Burns Red, Suicide Silence, MyChildren MyBride, Don the Reader, KillWhitneyDead and Emmure. The band would continue on until 2009. It was announced that Underneath the Gun had disbanded because of Vocalist Harrison DeGrote's growing health concerns. The band was set to play Artery Metal Tour, with Impending Doom, Carnifex, Miss May I, Conducting the Grave, and Molotov Solution, but because of DeGrote's health issues, they were forced to drop out. Guitarist Trevor Vickers would go on to join Confide a year after they disbanded, while several other members joined Mirror of Dead Faces and Impending Doom.

== Members ==
Current

- Harrison DeGrote – vocals (2004-2009, 2023–present)
- Trevor Vickers – guitars (2004-2009, 2023) (ex-Confide)
- Brandon Trahan – drums (ex-Impending Doom, ex-Mirror of Dead Faces, ex-xDeathstarx)

Former

- Jake Foust – guitars (ex-Impending Doom, ex-Mirror of Dead Faces)
- Ryan Alipour – guitars
- Scotty Chappel – bass guitar
- Danny – guitars
- Kyle Simms – bass guitar
- Javi Bueno – bass guitar (Household Words)
- Isaac Bueno – drums (ex-Impending Doom, ex-Mirror of Dead Faces)
- Josh Patterson – drums
- Justin Osterhoudt - drums [versa 2006-2008]

== Discography ==
Studio albums

- The Awakening (2006, This City is Burning)
- Forfeit Misfortunes (2009, Ferret)

EPs

- You Prepare the Bodies, I'll Prepare the Ice (2006, This City is Burning)

Singles

- "As Within, So Without" (2023)
- "Burial Crown" (2023)
