= Penknifelovelife =

English metalcore band

- Origin: Leeds, West Yorkshire, UK
- Genres: Metalcore; pop screamo; post-hardcore
- Years active: 2004–2007
- Label: Small Town
- Past members: Ross Kenyon; Luke Shuttleworth; Daniel Hamer; Jake Greenwood; Jacob Grace

Penknifelovelife was an English metalcore band from Leeds. Formed in 2004, for most of its time, the band consisted of Ross Kenyon (vocals), Jake Greenwood (bass), Luke Shuttleworth (guitar), Daniel Hamer (guitar) and Jacob Grace (drums). The band quickly gained a follow from tracks released on MySpace, soon releasing their debut album There Is Nothing More Romantic Than Watching the World Die in 2005. It was followed by two EPs: 2005's self-titled and 2006's Porphyria's Lover. They helped to establish the use of electronic music elements in metalcore and popularise the scene subculture in the United Kingdom. At the end of 2006, Kenyon left the band following a move to California, however rejoined upon returning a few months later. In 2007, the band announced Kenyon had left again, moved back to California and rejoined Confide. They briefly recruited a new vocalist, but disbanded shortly after.

== History ==
Penknifelovelife performed an early show in Bradford venue the Market Tavern, in summer 2004. That show was attended by Pete Small Town, who became motivated to start a record label. He soon founded Small Town Records, whose first signing were Penknifelovelife. On 7 October 2004, they released three songs on their MySpace. On 5 November 2004, they released the single "Touch Me Again and I'll Stab a Screwdriver into Your Face". On 17 November 2004, they opened Fastline Festival in Leeds.

On 10 February 2005, they released There Is Nothing More Romantic Than Watching The World Die, their debut EP. Between 16 February and 20 February, they headlined a tour of the UK with supports from Bring Me the Horizon and Enter Shikari. Between 16 March and 11 April, they headlined a tour of the UK with local supports including Bring Me the Horizon. On 29 March, they released an advertisement for a new drummer. Between 1 and 13 August, they headlined a tour of the UK.

On 3 June, they released their self-titled EP through Small Town Records. They performed at the 2005 Reading and Leeds Festivals, as well as their 28 June "showcase evening" at the Cockpit. Around this time, they toured UK with support from the Intent and A Destructive Issue. On 27 September, they released a series of demos through their MySpace. On 3 December 2005 in Tessenderlo, Belgium, where three audience members were stabbed. Between 24 March and 14 April 2006, they toured the UK with Blacktop. For the rest of April, they toured with Phinius Gage. On 13 June, they played Funtime Fest in Belgium.

The band were scheduled to tour the UK with Phinius Gage between 16 and 29 November 2006, however on 15 November, their tour van was stolen, leading the band to drop off the tour. That month, they released the EP Porphyria's Lover. In late 2006, Kenyon briefly moved to California, where he became the vocalist for Confide. Soon, Kenyon moved back to the UK, where Penknifelovelife completed another headline tour. On 28 June 2007, the band announced that Kenyon had departed from the band again, because he had converted to Christianity and God had told him to move back to California. Kenyon soon rejoined Confide. The remaining members briefly recruited a new vocalist, but soon disbanded.

== Musical style ==
Critics categorised Penknifelovelife's music as metalcore, post-hardcore and pop screamo.

Their music made use of rhythm changes, singing, soft instrumental sections, twin lead guitars, guitar solos, sexual lyrics and double kick drums. Vocals varied between death growls, singing and singing, with sung vocals resembling spoken word Punktastic described their sound as "the stage presence of a Senses Fail, the screaming of an Avenged Sevenfold and the brutal guitars and breakdowns of a From Autumn To Ashes".

A 2006 article by Punktastic credited the band, alongside Bring Me the Horizon as popularising electronic music elements amongst metal bands, noting their influence upon Enter Shikari. The same year, BBC credited them with repopularising pop screamo. They also helped to bring the scene subculture to mainstream in the UK. A 2015 article by Metal Hammer writer Thea de Gallier called them "One of the most well-known names among British scenesters", and a 2019 article by Kerrang! writer Jake Richardson called them an "era-defining MySpace" band.

== Discography ==
Studio albums

- There Is Nothing More Romantic Than Watching the World Die (2005)

EPs

- Penknifelovelife (2005)
- Porphyria's Lover (2006)

== Members ==
- Ross Kenyon – vocals
- Luke Shuttleworth – guitar
- Daniel Hamer - guitar
- Jake Greenwood – bass
- Jacob Grace – drums
