= Called to Arms =

Metal band

- Origin: Raleigh, North Carolina
- Genres: Progressive metal, melodic hardcore (early)
- Years active: 2003–present
- Label: Tragic Hero
- Members: Daniel Grissom; Brady Sweat; Jamie Nickerson; Joshua Philips; Grayson Sweat
- Past members: Zack Van Hoy
- Website: Called to Arms on Facebook

Called to Arms is a progressive metal band started in Raleigh, North Carolina in 2003. They are currently signed to Tragic Hero Records and they recorded their most recent album with Jamie King, which was released digitally August 10, 2010. The album is based on The Screwtape Letters written by C. S. Lewis.

== History ==
Daniel Grissom, Jamie Nickerson, Zack Van Hoy, and Josh Philips formed the group in 2003 as a melodic hardcore band. The band's second show ever was at a small independent venue that also featured Showbread, The Showdown, and He Is Legend (known as Uriah Omen at the time). This specific show was notable because none of these bands were signed to major labels at the time, but all have since gone on to release critically acclaimed albums on major labels. He Is Legend would later join Called to Arms on the same record label in 2009 when they signed to Tragic Hero Records.

In 2004, Called to Arms added Brady Sweat on lead guitar and shifted the band's sound toward more technical metal. Known for technical guitar-work and retro style metal solos, critics also have praised their more melodic side for being the quality that has made them stand out in their genre. Not afraid to experiment, the group's The Last Lament EP was described as "a 28-minute trip through nearly every subgenre of metal that exists".

In 2007, Grayson Sweat replaced Van Hoy in the band while he chose to focus on his indie band Dakota Darling.

The group recorded and mastered their 3rd and most recent album Peril and the Patient with Jamie King (Between the Buried and Me, Glass Casket, Beloved) at the Basement Studios in Winston-Salem, North Carolina. This album displays a further progression in songwriting as the band attempted to disassociate themselves from the metalcore genre "by fusing together a plethora of heavy metal subgenres, all the while keeping a varied, original and interesting sound." The band has stated their influences on this record came from bands like Queen, Smashing Pumpkins, The Mars Volta, Deftones, and System of a Down rather than bands that people would normally associate them with.

== Facts ==
- Brady has been involved musically in several other projects—most notably he toured and wrote with Facedown Records/Dreamt Music act My Epic when previous guitarist Travis Brooks left. Travis Brooks later filled in for Called to Arms guitarist Jamie Nickerson for two shows in 2007.
- Harvard and The Bear Romantic vocalist/multi-instrumentalist Jesse Clasen recorded and produced the band's early material as well as providing guest vocals on several tracks
- Lane Wood (who provided guest vocals on "Ashamed, Awake") sang the national anthem before the Panthers vs Dolphins game on Friday, August 17, 2012.

== Members ==
Current

- Daniel Grissom – Vocals, Keys (2003–present)
- Brady Sweat – Lead Guitar (2004–present)
- Jamie Nickerson – Rhythm Guitar (2003–present)
- Josh Philips – Bass (2003–present)
- Grayson Sweat – Drums (2007–present)

Former

- Zack Van Hoy – Drums (2003-2007)

Live

- Travis Brooks – Rhythm Guitar (2007)

== Discography ==
Studio albums

- A New Life Given (2004)
- The Last Lament (2007)
- Peril and the Patient (2010)

Demos

- Demo 2003 (Demo, 2003)
- Locked and Loaded Demo (Demo, 2004)
