= The Oh Hellos =

American indie folk rock duo

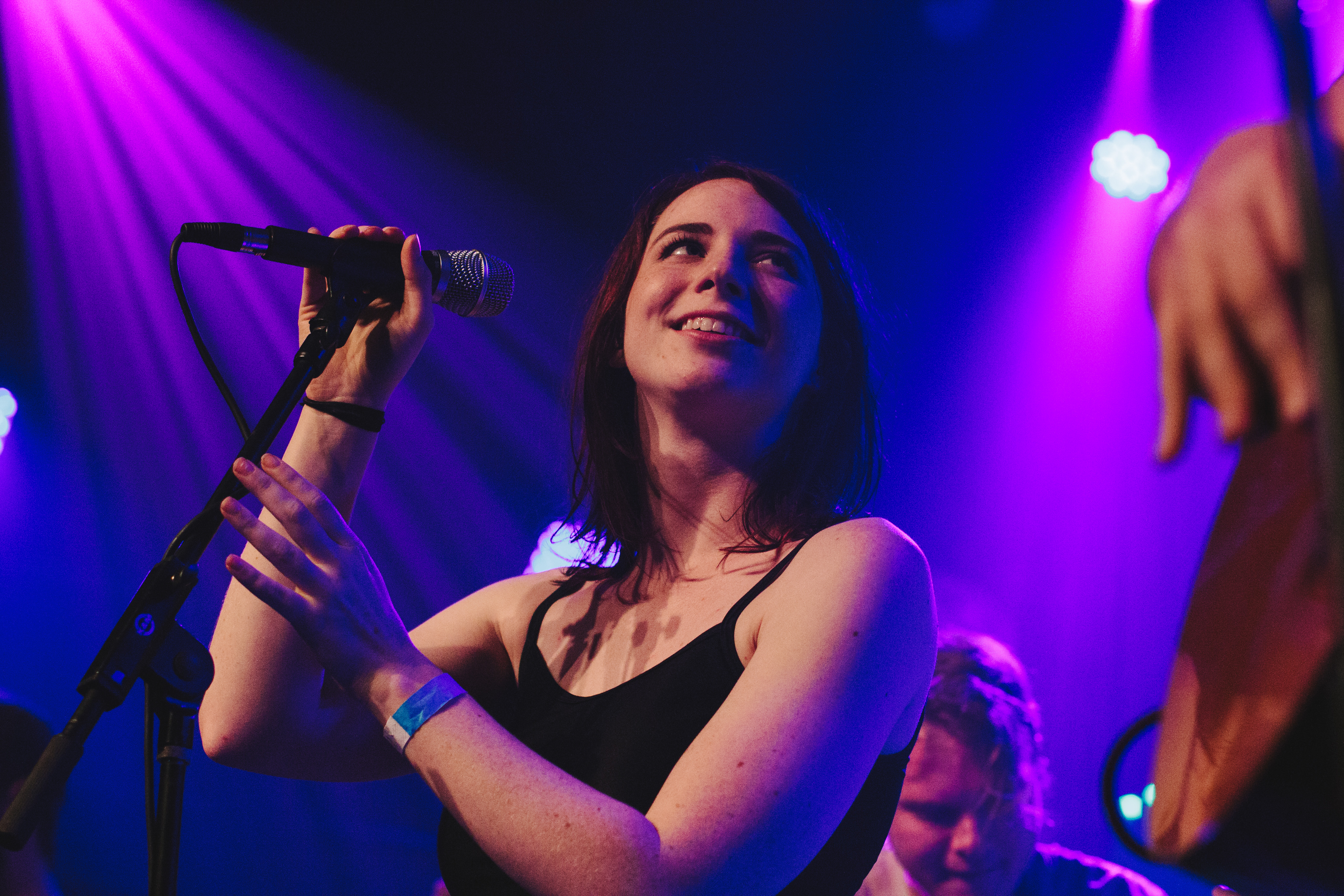
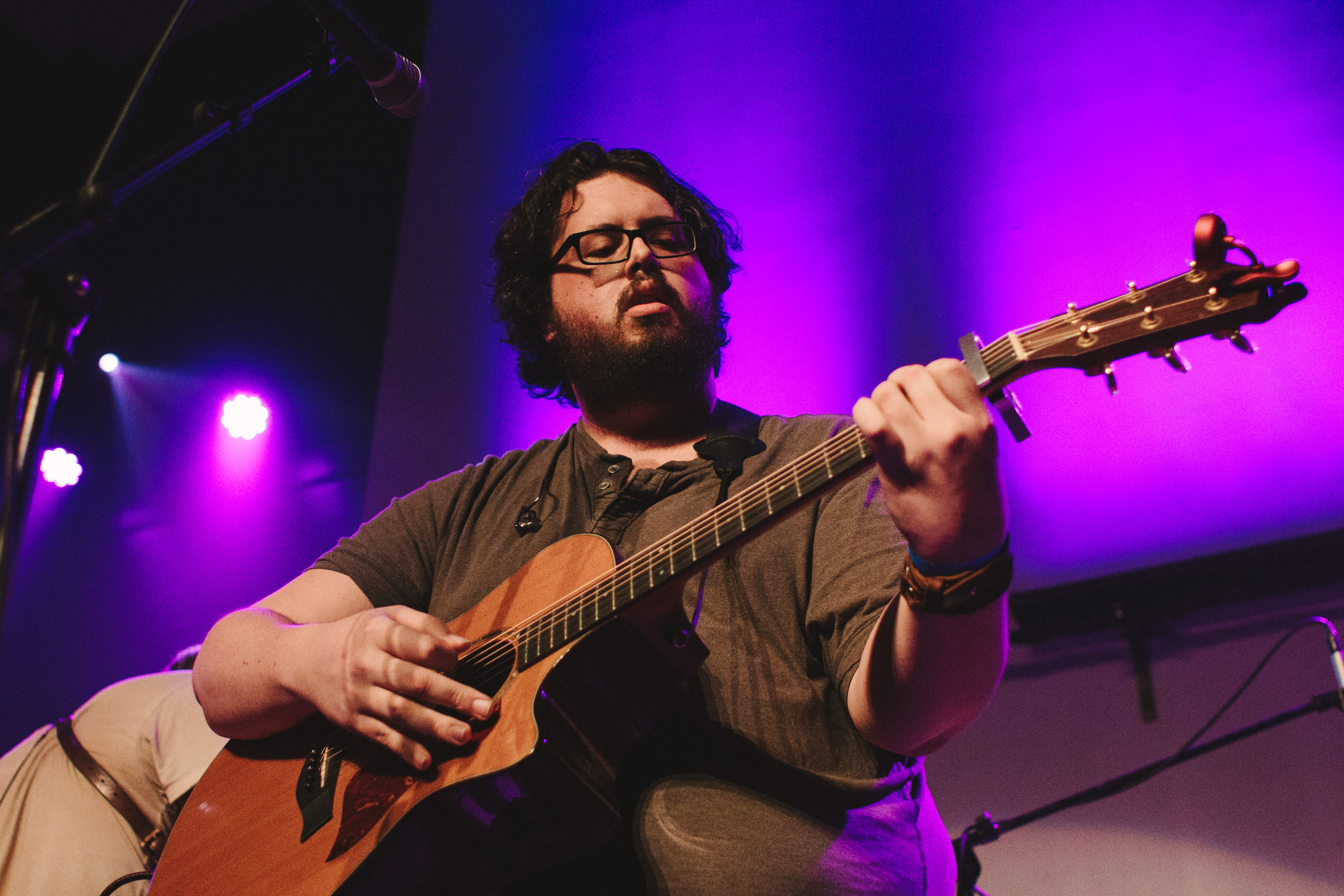

Background information
- Origin: San Marcos, Texas, US
- Genres: Folk rock; indie folk; symphonic folk
- Years active: 2011–present
- Label: Independent
- Members: Tyler Heath; Maggie Heath
- Website: theohhellos.com

The Oh Hellos are an American indie folk rock duo formed in 2011 in San Marcos, Texas, consisting of siblings Tyler and Maggie Heath, often backed by a string band. They remain an independent band, with eight releases: The Oh Hellos; Through the Deep, Dark Valley; Dear Wormwood; Notos; Eurus; Boreas; and Zephyrus; as well as a Christmas EP: The Oh Hellos' Family Christmas Album. The band initially found success on the music promotion website Bandcamp, and its music was later featured on NBC's Parenthood.

== History ==
Tyler Heath began writing and recording music in 2007, having released three albums by himself: Let It Go, A Christmas Album, and We're All In This Together. In 2011, he was joined by his sister, Maggie Heath, to write a song together for their mother's birthday. Their success led the two to form The Oh Hellos, releasing their self-titled EP later that year. On October 30, 2012, they released their self-produced debut album, Through The Deep, Dark Valley.

On December 5, 2014, The Oh Hellos released The Oh Hellos' Family Christmas Album, as their second EP.

On October 16, 2015, The Oh Hellos released Dear Wormwood, their second album. Dear Wormwood was inspired by The Screwtape Letters by C. S. Lewis and the writing of Patrick Rothfuss. To quote the Cor Chronicle, "Just as the book follows the back-and-forth letters between two demons who plan to foil unaware Christians, many of the songs within the album poignantly describe a relationship with evil, the singer’s struggle to break free and the final triumph that will come when an unnamed hero has overcome death,".

Several songs by The Oh Hellos are featured in the 2017 Fox Searchlight Pictures film Table 19, including "In Memoriam", "Wishing Well", "Hello My Old Heart" and "The Lament of Eustace Scrubb".

On November 14, 2017, the band debuted a single, "Torches", from their EP Notos, which debuted December 8, 2017. Notos was the first EP in an ongoing series of four, taking their names from Greco-Roman deities of wind named Anemoi. In a similar fashion, the band released a single, "Grow" on January 18, 2018, from the next EP in the series, Eurus, which released February 9, 2018.

On September 4, 2020, the band released the third of the four EPs, Boreas. They released a new single, "Soap", on October 2, 2020.

On October 16, 2020, the band released the fourth of the four EPs, Zephyrus.

To celebrate the 10 year anniversary of The Oh Hellos EP, Tyler and Maggie recorded a new, acoustic version of "Hello My Old Heart", which was released on December 1, 2021.

On October 28, 2022, Maggie and Tyler released a remastered version of their debut album, Through The Deep, Dark Valley, to celebrate its 10-year anniversary. The album was remastered with the help of Charlie Kramsky.

On December 8, 2023, The Oh Hellos released a new single titled "December '04".

On December 15, 2023, The Oh Hellos released a new EP, The Oh Hellos' Family Christmas Album: Volume II, as a successor to their EP, The Oh Hellos' Family Christmas Album.

== Musical style and influences ==
The Oh Hellos have a "Celtic-influenced style" that has also been referred to as a “majestic” brand of folk-pop. Though they write all of their music themselves, Maggie and Tyler combine their voices with a string band and choir to complete their sound. In the past, there have been up to 13 musicians on stage with them while they are performing.

Maggie and Tyler have a very deep, introspective style. A defining characteristic of their music is the contrast between their soft melodies and intense lyrics, creating 'a sort of tension', as The Daily Times calls it. Many of their releases, such as Through the Deep, Dark Valley and Dear Wormwood, could be considered concept albums as they tend to tell a story with concepts and themes running through it. Their lyrics often contain Greek mythological, Biblical, and literary allusions.

== Discography ==
=== Albums ===
- Through the Deep, Dark Valley (2012)
- Dear Wormwood (2015)
- Notos (2017)
- Eurus (2018)
- Boreas (2020)
- Zephyrus (2020)
- Through the Deep, Dark Valley (2022 remaster)

=== EPs ===
- The Oh Hellos EP (2011)
- The Oh Hellos' Family Christmas Album (2014)
- The Oh Hellos' Family Christmas Album: Volume II (2023)

=== Singles ===
- "Bitter Water" (2015)
- "Dear Wormwood" (2015)
- "Torches" (2017)
- "Grow" (2018)
- "Boreas" (2020)
- "Soap" (2020)
- "Hello My Old Heart (Ten Year Anniversary)" (2021)
- "December '04" (2023)
