= Dear Wormwood =

Studio album by The Oh Hellos
- Released: October 16, 2015
- Genres: Folk rock, indie folk
- Length: 39:02
- Label: Elektra
- Producers: Maggie and Tyler Heath

The Oh Hellos chronology
The Oh Hellos' Family Christmas Album (2013)	Dear Wormwood (2015)	Notos (2017)

Dear Wormwood is the second album by American folk rock band The Oh Hellos, released October 16, 2015. It was written, produced, and performed primarily by siblings Tyler and Maggie Heath, with the exception of "Danse Macabre", which was composed by Camille Saint-Saëns in 1874. The mixing and mastering was done by Charlie Kramsky, with extra vocals being recorded by members of the ensemble that tours with the duo, including Matthew Hagerman and Joey Chance.

== Background ==
The album was released on October 16, 2015, to act as a volume two of the band's debut album, Through the Deep, Dark Valley.

The album takes its title from the novel The Screwtape Letters by C. S. Lewis, which has every chapter of the book begin with the words "Dear Wormwood,". It draws further inspiration from the book by framing each song as a letter from someone in an abusive or unhealthy relationship to their abuser, reversing how the book was composed of letters trying to teach one demon how to lead a particular human astray. The songs vary in tone from lovingly addressed to determined to escape the relationship. It also draws inspiration from The Kingkiller Chronicle by Patrick Rothfuss, with the descriptions of literature, language, and music being an influence on the way the album was written. It's described as a sequel to their first album Through the Deep, Dark Valley, with the first album concerning where the speaker of the album has been, and Dear Wormwood dealing with the speaker having to pick up and move on from where he left off.

== Critical reception and response ==
Professional ratings
Review scores
Source	Rating
AllMusic	3.5/5 stars
Glide Magazine	8/10

Dear Wormwood peaked at #134 on Billboard 200 and stayed there for a week.

Neil Z. Yeung gave the album 3.5 stars out of 5, saying that "These songs are heavy on the drama, but the conviction with which the band delivers each one borders on glorious rapture." Brandon Easley of Glide Magazine gave Dear Wormwood an 8/10, calling the album "a fantastic recording that is easy to share".

== Track listing ==
All tracks are written by Maggie and Tyler Heath, unless noted.

Dear Wormwood track listing
No.	Title	Length
1.	"Prelude"	1:08
2.	"Bitter Water"	3:16
3.	"There Beneath"	2:58
4.	"In the Blue Hours of Morning"	0:43
5.	"Exeunt"	2:33
6.	"Caesar"	4:42
7.	"This Will End"	3:13
8.	"Pale White Horse"	3:27
9.	"Where Is Your Rider"	3:19
10.	"Soldier, Poet, King"	2:45
11.	"Dear Wormwood"	5:16
12.	"Danse Macabre (Saint-Saëns)"	2:02
13.	"Thus Always to Tyrants"	3:40
Total length:		39:02
