= USS Vesuvius =

USS Vesuvius may refer to:

- USS Vesuvius (1806), a bomb ketch operated during the first decade of the 19th century
- USS Vesuvius (1846), a bomb brig saw action during the Mexican–American War
- Tippecanoe, a Canonicus-class monitor, was renamed Vesuvius on 15 June 1869 and subsequently renamed Wyandotte on 10 August 1869
- USS Vesuvius (1888), a dynamite gun cruiser which bombarded Cuba during the Spanish–American War
- USS Vesuvius (AE-15), an ammunition ship that saw action during World War II, the Korean War, and the Vietnam War

The 1806 ship was named for the volcano namesake and all others named after the 1806 ship.
