= Shout the Truth =

Studio album by Confide
- Released: June 17, 2008
- Recorded: 2007
- Genre: Post-hardcore, metalcore, screamo
- Length: 35:05
- Label: Science, Tragic Hero (reissue)
- Producer: Cameron Webb, Joel Piper

Confide chronology
Introduction (2006)	Shout the Truth (2008)	Recover (2010)

Re-recorded cover
- Cover for the re-recording of Shout the Truth

Professional ratings
Review scores
Source	Rating
Absolute Punk	81%
Jesus Freak Hideout	3.5/5 stars
Punknews.org	1.5/5 stars
Exclaim!	not rated

Re-release
Review scores
Source	Rating
Jesus Freak Hideout	4/5 stars

Shout the Truth is the debut full-length album by American metalcore band Confide, released on June 17, 2008

== Background ==
The album was released on Science Records (Warner Bros.), the same label as Blessthefall and Greeley Estates were on at that time, before the label shut-down.

Shout the Truth was the first album featuring England-native Ross Kenyon, besides the group's 2008 demo recording. Two of the songs from the demo were also re-recorded for this full-length; "Zeal" and "The Bigger Picture". The album was also the last album to feature original member and lead guitarist, Aaron VanZutphen, and was the only album to feature drummer, Arin Ilejay.

== Re-recording ==
The re-issue of Shout the Truth was released on September 8, 2009, through Tragic Hero Records, as opposed to the album's original pressing over Science Records. For this re-recording, Confide went back to Cameron Webb's studio to re-record the clean vocals with new drummer and vocalist Joel Piper, with an exception for "Such Great Heights". Piper only recorded vocals for these songs and does not play the drums on any of the tracks on the re-release. The drums on all other tracks are the original drums recorded on the original album by former drummer Arin Ilejay. The original lead guitar tracks were also used from the old mix, as recorded by former guitarist Aaron VanZutphen, except the guitars on "Such Great Heights" which were recorded by new member Joshua Paul. This re-release was also last album to feature the original member/bassist Billy Pruden.

The album also features 3 bonus tracks: "Role Reversal", "I Never Saw This Coming" (both recorded in 2008 as b-sides) and "Such Great Heights", a cover of the song by electronic group, The Postal Service. The cover of "Such Great Heights", which was recorded by Joel Piper at Joel Piper's recording studio in Fresno, Ca, became an internet phenomenon in 2009. Two music videos were released for this album: "Such Great Heights" and "I Never Saw This Coming".

== Track listing ==
No.	Title	Length
1.	"Millstone"	3:14
2.	"Can't See the Forest for the Trees"	2:26
3.	"I Am Scared of Me"	3:32
4.	"City to City"	2:42
5.	"Zeal"	2:56
6.	"If We Were a Sinking Ship"	3:16
7.	"00:00"	2:01
8.	"Holes"	3:11
9.	"Vultures Among the Dead"	3:10
10.	"The Bigger Picture"	2:39
11.	"In Reply"	3:43
12.	"This I Believe"	2:29

Re-issue bonus tracks
No.	Title	Length
13.	"Such Great Heights" (The Postal Service cover)	4:24
14.	"Role Reversal"	2:45
15.	"I Never Saw This Coming"	3:31

== Personnel ==
Confide (on original pressing)

- Ross Michael Kenyon - lead vocals
- Jeffrey Helberg - rhythm guitar, vocals on "This I Believe"
- Aaron Richard Van Zutphen - lead guitar, vocals on "This I Believe", "Vultures Among the Dead" and "If We Were a Sinking Ship"
- William "Billy" Pruden - bass, vocals on "This I Believe"
- Arin Ilejay - drums, percussion, vocals on "This I Believe"

Confide (on re-recording)

- Ross Michael Kenyon - lead vocals
- Jeffrey Helberg - rhythm guitar, clean vocals on "This I Believe"
- William 'Billy' Pruden - bass guitar, clean vocals on "This I Believe"
- Joel Piper - drums on "Such Great Heights", clean vocals on all tracks except "Can't See the Forest for the Trees", "If We Were a Sinking Ship", "The Bigger Picture" and "This I Believe"
- Joshua Paul - lead guitar on "Such Great Heights"

Production

Produced, mixed and mastered by Cameron Webb (for both versions)
