= Confide (band) =

American metalcore band

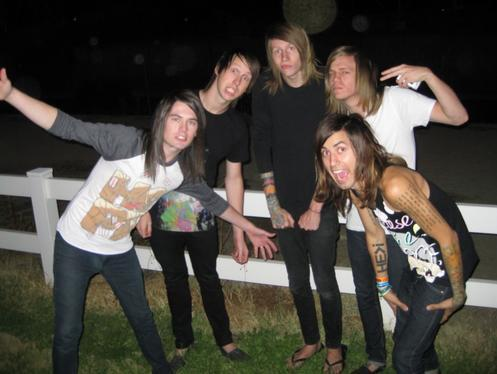
- Confide in 2009

Background information
- Origin: Anaheim, California, U.S.
- Genres: Metalcore; post-hardcore; screamo; deathcore (early)
- Years active: 2004–2010; 2012–2013
- Labels: Science; Tragic Hero; Warner Bros
- Past members: Aaron Richard Van Zutphen; Arin Ilejay; Jason Pickard; Jeffrey Helberg; John Penton; Joshua Paul; Josh Plesh; Joel Piper; Ross Michael Kenyon; Trevor Vickers; William 'Billy' Pruden

Confide was an American metalcore band from Anaheim, California, formed in 2004. They released two EPs and three full-length albums. Although all the members of the group are openly Christian, they have not been marketed in the Christian market since the band is on a secular label.

The band toured across the United States, following their debut album Shout the Truth. They also toured Europe and Asia with later albums. On October 4, 2010, Frontman Ross Kenyon announced that the band would be disbanding after their Japan tour. The band played their farewell show on November 7, 2010, in Pomona, CA. The band temporarily reformed in August 2012 to write and record their third full-length record titled "All is Calm" through Kickstarter. All is Calm was released on July 30, 2013, and a short tour was booked to promote the new record. Although Confide has stated they will not be reforming permanently, drummer Joel Piper said that there is possibility for them to play again in the future, but nothing permanent. On November 30, 2018, Confide played at The Glasshouse in Pomona, California for the 10th anniversary of Shout The Truth. It included the lineup from the album's initial release. The show also included Secrets, Dayseeker, Noble, and Rivals. After the breakup, some of the members joined other bands. Most notable, when drummer Arin Ilejay joined Avenged Sevenfold in 2011.

== History ==
=== Formation and first EPs (2004–2006) ===
Confide was originally started in August 2004 by Aaron Van Zutphen, Jason Pickard and Josh Plesh as a deathcore act. They went looking for members in their youth group. Plesh was friends with Billy Pruden while both Pruden and Zutphen knew Jeff Helberg. These five made-up the original Confide line-up. They released two EPs at this time; Innocence Surround and Introduction.

By the end of 2006, vocalist Josh Plesh left the band, and was replaced by Ross Michael Kenyon, putting his other band Penknifelovelife on hiatus. Kenyon was born and raised in the United Kingdom and moved to the United States to be with his girlfriend and at the same time, went online to search for bands that required a vocalist. After communicating with Helberg, Kenyon joined Confide and moved to his house where they started practicing. This change in line-up made the band shift into a purist metalcore sound; dropping nearly all death metal influence.

In 2007, Kenyon was forced to move back to England and began performing in Penknifelovelife again, this time putting Confide on hiatus. After one tour with And Their Eyes Were Bloodshot in Europe he stated on his band's Myspace that he was leaving the band permanently to put focus into Confide. Penknifelovelife split up and Confide started writing for their debut full-length.

=== Signing to Science Records and debut album (2006–2009) ===
Confide's first full-length CD, titled Shout the Truth, was released on June 17, 2008, through Science Records. Shout the Truth received mixed reviews; Altsounds called the album out on its unoriginality: "[T]he whole CD is very samey and they're not producing anything different from what many other bands have already done and are just sticking to a now-dated sound." They toured extensively in 2008 to support the album. In comparison to the CD review, Altsounds approved of their live shows: "Confide delivers an adrenaline-fueled live show that does not disappoint."

Shortly after the album was released, Science Records was eliminated by its parent company, Warner Bros. Records and Confide was left without a label causing founding member Aaron Van Zutphen and drummer Arin Ilejay to leave in January 2009. In April 2009, the band was signed to Tragic Hero Records, recruited former member, drummer Joel Piper who also took the role of clean vocalist, and guitarist Joshua Paul, and began performing all across the United States, on tours such as the "Don't Take Your Guns to Tour", alongside bands Once Nothing, Here I Come Falling, and In Fear and Faith. Following this, the band headlined a promotional tour alongside acts Therefore I am and Oceana.

On July 25, 2009, the band announced that they were going to re-release their album Shout the Truth. The re-release contained two bonus songs, one of which is a cover of the song "Such Great Heights" by The Postal Service, and was released on September 8, 2009.

=== Recover, cancelled tours, and break-up (2009–2010) ===
In January 2010, before the recording process of Confide's sophomore album started, founding bassist "Billy Pruden" left the band to pursue other endeavors. In February, they finished recording their second full-length studio album. The new album, entitled Recover, was released May 18. On April 7, Confide released a new song, entitled When Heaven Is Silent, from the new album. On April 21, they released a second song from the new album titled Now or Never. Along with their new album, they released their second full-length music video. They were planning to embark on the Band of Brothers tour.

However, on September 28, 2010, Confide dropped off the Band of Brothers tour on one of the last shows of the tour in California. They also had taken their name off of Miss May I's headlining Monument Tour. Miss May I bassist Ryan Neff confirmed that Confide had broken up, but the post was later removed. Joel Piper also stated on his Twitter, "My phone and email is blowing up right now. Some of you guys might know why." His tweet was later deleted also. Miss May I went on to talk about their tour because The Word Alive also dropped the Monument Tour. They stated "The Word Alive has decided to go on tour with A Day to Remember instead of the Monument Tour, and Confide informed us that they will not be doing the tour any longer because they are breaking up. Sorry to anyone who this disappoints, we do not have any further information on those band's situations." It was then unclear on what was happening with the band. The band updated their official Facebook page with information about their tour in Japan on September 29.

On October 4, 2010, Confide officially announced their breakup. They stated that they would part ways when they returned from their tour of Japan in early October. The band planned to play a handful of farewell shows on the West Coast. On November 7, 2010, Confide had their final show at the Glasshouse in Pomona, California. The event was a sold-out show, filling the venue's 800 person capacity, where they also had local bands open up for them that Confide had shared the stage with at other venues around Southern California. After the show was over, fans from all around the country were outside awaiting to say their goodbyes and take pictures with the band one last time.

=== Reunion studio album, All Is Calm (2012–2013) ===
Confide reunited for a one-time show at the Playground Festival in Hidden Valley, California on September 4, 2011. Vocalist Kenyon announced via his Twitter page that he would announce a solo project sometime in 2012. Singer/Drummer, Piper announced and started a new pop music project and released one online EP called The Only One which independent release charted at top 40 on the Billboard Heatseekers Chart, and #11 on iTunes Pop Album Chart. Then later released full-length album "Dying To Live". And has only seen the stage a handful of times as solo artist as he was producing for other artists and bands. On August 31, 2012, Confide announced their reunion and launched their Kickstarter campaign. The band needed $30,000 by October 1, 2012, to create a new album. As of September 4, the band had reached the $30,000 they need to produce their album. On September 30, 2012, Confide was successfully funded and had received $38,709 in fan support for their album project. According to the band's Kickstarter page the album is set to release in early 2013. Confide is performing at several festivals since the funding of the album, small scale touring is speculated. The band released their first single, "Sooner or Later", from their upcoming album on March 12, 2013. On July 1, 2013, Confide announced that their new album All is Calm is finished and will be released on July 30, 2013.

== Other projects ==
The members of Confide have gone on to take part in many other bands and projects, most notably Avenged Sevenfold and Of Mice & Men. Former drummer Arin Ilejay joined Avenged Sevenfold and then was fired from the band, but as of 2015 has joined the nu-metal band Islander. Drummer Joel Piper started his own solo worship project after quitting Of Mice & Men. Aaron VanZutphen currently plays in the metal band Nekrogoblikon.

== Musical style ==
Allmusic describes the band as metalcore as well as "post-hardcore with a CCM/electro/screamo-pop twist". HM described them as a "blend of screamo trying to be held back on the ankle by metalcore". Early in their career, Confide was a deathcore band before evolving into the metalcore sound for which they are now recognized.

== Band members ==
Final lineup

- Jeffrey Helberg – rhythm guitar, backing vocals (2004–2010, 2012–2013)
- Ross Michael Kenyon – lead vocals (2006–2010, 2012–2013)
- Trevor Vickers – bass (2010, 2012–2013)
- Joel Piper – drums, clean vocals, keyboards (2009–2010, 2012–2013)
- Joshua Patrick Paul – lead guitar (2009–2010, 2012–2013)

Former members

- Josh Plesh – lead vocals (2004–2006)
- Aaron Van Zutphen – lead guitar, clean vocals, keyboards (2004–2009)
- William 'Billy' Pruden – bass (2004–2010)
- Jason Pickard – drums (2004–2005)
- John Penton – drums (2005–2007)
- Arin Ilejay – drums (2007–2009)

== Discography ==
Albums

- Shout the Truth (Science, 2008)
- Recover (Tragic Hero, 2010)
- All Is Calm (self-released, 2013)

EPs

- Innocence Surround (self-released, 2005)
- Introduction (self-released, 2006)

Demos

- Demo (self-released, 2008)

=== Singles ===
- "Tighten It Up" (Tragic Hero, 2010)

== Music videos ==
Year	Song	Director	Album
2007	"Zeal" (never was completed)	Ryan Wilson	Demo 2008
2008	"If We Were a Sinking Ship"	Daniel Chesnut	Shout the Truth
2009	"Such Great Heights"	Daniel Chesnut	Shout the Truth (reissue)
2010	"I Never Saw This Coming"	Luke Rocheleau	Shout the Truth (reissue)
2010	"The View from My Eyes"	Jon Stone	Recover
