= Brand of Sacrifice =

Canadian deathcore band

- Origin: Toronto, Ontario, Canada
- Genres: Deathcore
- Years active: 2018–present
- Labels: Unique Leader Records; Blood Blast Distribution; Nuclear Blast
- Spinoff of: The Afterimage
- Members: Kyle Anderson; Liam Beeson; Andrew Kim; Michael Leo Valeri; Chason Westmoreland
- Past members: James Knoerl; Mike Caputo; Rob Zalischi; Dallas Bricker
- Website: brandofsacrifice.com

Brand of Sacrifice is a Canadian deathcore band from Toronto formed in 2018 after the dissolution of The Afterimage, of which Kyle Anderson, Michael Leo Valeri, Liam Beeson, Dallas Bricker, and Rob Zalischi were previously in. The band was inspired by the work of manga artist Kentaro Miura, specifically his Berserk series, and has based much of their music on his works.

== History ==
Founded in 2018 from the ashes of The Afterimage, they released their debut EP the same year, titled "The Interstice". The following year, they released their first album, God Hand. In 2021, they independently released their sophomore studio album Lifeblood, which was met with positive reception. Later that year, they collaborated with Lorna Shore vocalist Will Ramos on a re-release of their song "Lifeblood". The band released their second EP, "Between Death and Dreams", in April 2023 which contains four songs. Vocalist Kyle Anderson is often seen doing collaborations with musician and YouTuber Nik Nocturnal.

== Band members ==
Current

- Kyle Anderson – lead vocals (2018–present)
- Liam Beeson – guitars (2018–present)
- Michael Leo Valeri – guitars, keyboard, percussion (2018–present)
- Andrew Kim – bass (2023–present)

Former

- Rob Zalischi – drums (2018–2020)
- Dallas Bricker – bass (2018–2023)
- James Knoerl – drums (2020–2021)
- Mike Caputo – drums (2022–2023)
- Chason Westmoreland – drums (2023–2025)

Live

- Dylan Gould – bass (2018, 2019–2020)
- Robert Brown – guitars (2024)

== Discography ==
=== Albums ===
- God Hand (2019)
- Lifeblood (2021)

=== EPs ===
- The Interstice (2018)
- Between Death and Dreams (2023)

=== Singles ===
- "Demon King" (2020)
- "Lifeblood" (2021)
- "Animal" (2021)
- "Altered Eyes" (2021)
- "Enemy" feat. Spencer Chamberlain (2021)
- "Lifeblood" feat. Will Ramos (2021)
- "Darkbloom" with We Came as Romans (2021)
- "Demon King" feat. Ryo Kinoshita (2021)
- "Exodus" (2022)
- "Dynasty" (2023)
- "Awaken in Ashes" with Nik Nocturnal (2023)
- "Purge" (2023)
