= Duane Flatmo =

American artist

Duane Flatmo (born 1957) is an American artist best known for his murals, label art and kinetic art sculptures in northern California.

== Career ==
Flatmo’s first mural was the Bucksport Mural painted in 1984 at Bucksport Sporting Goods in Eureka, California. Since then his works have included the Murray Field Vintage 193 at Eureka Travel, Nature’s Bounty on the North Coast Co-op, A Landscape of Humboldt County at Pierson’s Building Center, Old Time Gas Station with Customers at Finnegan and Nasen Auto Supply, Fill’er up! on Henderson and F Streets, Horse and Hounds at Eureka Animal Clinic, Underwater Scene at Yakima Racks Corporate Offices, Multicultural Mural at Los Bagels, Pacific Outfitters in Arcata, Bigfoot at the Willow Creek Ace Hardware building, and Tribute to Architecture and Performing Arts on the Arkley Center of Performing Arts in Eureka, which is one of the largest murals in northern California measuring 70 feet by 70 feet.

Flatmo worked with the Rural Burl Mural Bureau in Eureka, CA, a youth group associated with Ink People Center for the Arts, painting murals throughout Old Town Eureka. Some of his completed works with the Bureau include Animals are People Too at Courthouse Market, The Gray Victorian on the east wall of Times Printing, Building Architecture on the north wall of Expert Tire, Climbing Plants on the north wall of the Vision Center, Inharmonious on the north wall of Eureka Rubber Stamp, Alley Cats on the south wall of Living Light Center, and No Barking Anytime on the north wall of the North Coast Dance Studios.

=== Kinetic sculptures ===
Flatmo has participated in many "kinetic sculpture races", including the Kinetic Grand Championship where he has been a regular competitor since 1982. In his first race, Flatmo co-created Pencilhead Express and entered his first Kinetic Grand Championship in Arcata, California. Over the next 30 years, Flatmo created kinetic sculptures such as: Spazzimotto, CrayolaHead, The Hammerhead Cadillac, The Geyser Gang, The Science Mobile, Robocroc, Artistic License, The Cattle Act, The Happy Swanderer, The Calistogasaurus, Crawdudes, The Armordillo, Subhumans, The Dragoons, Late Knights & crescent Wenches, Bass Ackwards, The King and Eye, Tiki Torture, Mega-Sore-Ass, Tide Fools, Surf N Turf, Bats in the Belfry, Extreme Makeover, The Armored Carp, Tin Pan Dragon, The Crustationwagon, and Road Kill Café.

Flatmo has been referenced for his kinetic sculptures in Pedaling Art in Artful Jesters, a Book of Innovators and Visual Wit and Humor by Nicholas Roukes and was also featured in a film called It'll Have Blinking Eyes and a Moving Mouth based on the Kinetic Grand Championship in Humboldt County, California. As a result of that film, Duane Flatmo, along with fellow kinetic artists June Moxon and Ken Beidleman, traveled to London in 1999 to film an episode of Junkyard Wars, which then led to an invitation to participate in a Chinese version of the game produced by Zhongqi Sun from Dezhou City, China in 2004.

=== Art Cars ===
Flatmo retired from Kinetic Sculpture racing after the 2012 race and focused his attention on eye-catching non-human powered art cars, the first being El Pulpo Mecanico, a 26-foot-tall fire-breathing kinetic octopus with mechanical bulging eyes, mouths and tentacles that has been seen at Burning Man in 2011 and 2012. El Pulpo Mecanico was also showcased at Nocturnal Wonderland in 2011 and Electric Daisy Carnival in 2012, and made an appearance at Arts Alive! in Eureka, CA. El Pulpo Mecanico was created from recycled metal scrap pieces from Arcata Scrap and Salvage, and is anchored onto a 1973 Ford 250. The model for El Pulpo Mecanico was made from trash found on the beaches of La Peñita de Jaltemba, Mexico. Duane Flatmo designed and created El Pulpo Mecanico, Steve Gellman produced the fire feature, and Jerry Kunkel fashioned the electrical work.

After being sold to a private party, El Pulpo Mecanico moved across the country and Flatmo began work on its successor, El Pulpo Magnifico.

=== Other work ===
Duane Flatmo’s other accomplishments include a performance on Stupid Pet Tricks/Stupid Human Tricks, a segment on Late Night with David Letterman in 1992, and he was also a finalist on the television program, America's Got Talent in August 2006, playing a guitar with an eggbeater and a weed whacker.

As a commercial artist, Flatmo designs some of the beer labels for Lost Coast Brewery in Eureka, California. He is also the artist behind the packaging for FoxFarm Soil and Fertilizer Company designing the labels for numerous custom fertilizer blends.

== Personal life ==
Flatmo lives in Eureka, California with his wife, fellow artist Micki Dyson Flatmo.
