= Vesuvius (band) =

- Also known as: Of Burning Empires (2012–15)
- Origin: Ottawa, Ontario, Canada
- Genres: Metal
- Years active: 2012–present
- Labels: Tragic Hero Records
- Members: Billy Melsness; Robin Parsons; Carter Peak
- Past members: Ben Cooligan; Michael Luc Malo; Jackson Paul Clarke
- Website: Official website

Vesuvius is a Canadian metal band from Ottawa, Ontario. Formed in 2012, it currently consists of Ben Cooligan (clean vocals), Billy Melsness (unclean vocals), Robin Parsons (keyboards / turntables), Michael Luc Malo (guitars) and Carter Peak (drums).

On February 26, 2016, it was announced through Alternative Press that Vesuvius had signed with Tragic Hero Records and released their debut single, "Nurture". They released their debut album, My Place Of Solace And Rest, on May 6, 2016.

== Discography ==
=== Studio albums ===
- My Place of Solace and Rest (2016)

=== Singles ===
- "This House Is Not A Home" (2015)
- "Nurture" (2016)

== Band members ==
=== Current ===
- Billy Melsness - Unclean vocals (2012–present)
- Robin Parsons - Keyboards, Turntables (2012–present)
- Carter Peak - Drums (2014–present)

=== Former ===
- Ben Cooligan - Clean vocals (2012–2016)
- Michael Luc Malo - Lead and Rhythm guitar (2015–2016)
