= Through the Deep, Dark Valley =

Studio album by The Oh Hellos
- Released: 2012
- Genres: Folk rock, indie folk
- Length: 39:19
- Producers: Maggie and Tyler Heath

The Oh Hellos chronology
The Oh Hellos EP (2011)	Through the Deep, Dark Valley (2012)	The Oh Hellos' Family Christmas Album (2013)

Through the Deep, Dark Valley is the debut album by American folk rock duo The Oh Hellos, released in 2012. Its 11 songs were written, produced, and performed by siblings Tyler and Maggie Heath. Most of the songs feature a traditional Celtic rhythm featuring acoustic guitars and smooth percussion.

While The Oh Hellos are not exclusively a Christian band, Through the Deep, Dark Valley carries strong biblical and spiritual themes. They also take heavy influence from the Christian writer, C.S. Lewis', book series, the Chronicles of Narnia. The songs vary between soft, melancholic ballads and lively, chant-like anthems, reflecting different emotional and spiritual struggles.

The album's themes also draw from the Heaths' personal experiences and reflections on love, family, personal growth, faith, and identity amid rebellion and exploration. Originally conceived as a concept album, it loosely follows a narrator’s journey of self-discovery as they confront their own faults, regrets, and the people and experiences they distanced themselves from during their rebellion. As Tyler Heath described, by the album’s end, the narrator reaches a turning point, realizing, "You know what? Maybe I need to go home and right some wrongs that I did," setting the stage for their path forward.

Two years later, in 2015, The Oh Hellos released Dear Wormwood as a second volume to their debut album.

== 2022 remaster ==
In 2022, to mark the 10 year anniversary of the album's release, The Oh Hellos remastered all of the songs on the album.

== Track listing ==
All tracks are written by Maggie and Tyler Heath.

Through the Deep, Dark, Valley track listing
No.	Title	Length
1.	"The Valley"	2:54
2.	"Like the Dawn"	5:05
3.	"Eat You Alive"	1:37
4.	"Second Child"	2:46
5.	"Wishing Well"	3:37
6.	"In Memoriam"	3:02
7.	"The Lament of Eustace Scrubb"	4:05
8.	"I Was Wrong"	4:24
9.	"I Have Made Mistakes"	4:49
10.	"The Truth Is a Cave"	4:00
11.	"The Valley (Reprise)"	2:55
Total length:		39:19
