= Tragic Hero Records =

- Founded: 2005
- Founder: Tommy LaCombe, David Varnedoe, Jason Ganthner
- Distributor: ADA (through East West)
- Genre: Metalcore, post-hardcore, rock, heavy metal
- Country of origin: United States
- Location: Raleigh, North Carolina; Cleveland, Ohio
- Official website: www.tragicherorecords.co

Tragic Hero Records is an independent record label founded in Raleigh, North Carolina, in March 2005 to represent the growing metalcore and post-hardcore scene of North Carolina. The label was founded by Tommy LaCombe, David Varnedoe, and Jason Ganthner. In 2010, Randy Chase, President of Fishhead Records (Sylvain Sylvain), joined the Tragic Hero team as Vice President. Alesana was the first band the label signed. Among Tragic Hero's best-known signees are Motionless in White, who later signed with Fearless Records, and then with Roadrunner Records, Strawberry Girls and A Skylit Drive, who reached No. 64 on the Billboard 200; Alesana, who later signed with Fearless Records, Letlive, who later signed with Epitaph Records, The Afterimage, who broke up and reformed as Brand of Sacrifice, and He Is Legend, who signed with Tragic Hero after several successful full-lengths on other labels.

== Notable artists ==
=== Current ===
- Girl Cologne

=== Former ===
- A Skylit Drive
- Akissforjersey
- Alesana (Revival Recordings)
- The Afterimage
- Boxbomb
- The Body Rampant
- Called To Arms
- Confide (band)
- Crossfaith (Razor & Tie)
- The Dead Rabbitts
- Erra (UNFD)
- Everyone Dies in Utah
- Finch
- Graves of Valor
- Greeley Estates
- He is Legend (Spinefarm Records)
- Invent Animate (UNFD)
- I Set My Friends On Fire
- In Dying Arms
- Iwrestledabearonce (Artery Recordings)
- Letlive
- The Morning Of
- Miracle at St. Anna
- Motionless In White (Roadrunner Records)
- Pathways
- PVRIS (Warner Records)
- Sirens and Sailors (Artery Recordings)
- Sky Eats Airplane
- Strawberry Girls
- Telescreen
- To Speak of Wolves (Solid State Records)
- Vesuvius
- We Are Defiance
- Whitney Peyton
