= Emarosa =

American rock band

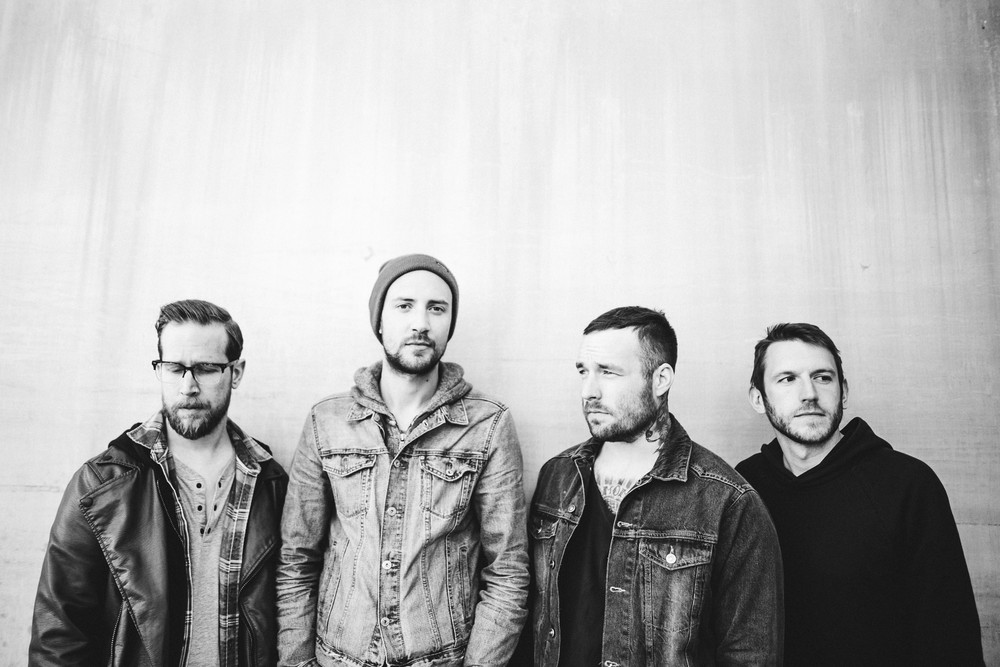
- Emarosa in 2016

Background information
- Origin: Lexington, Kentucky, U.S.
- Genres: Alternative rock; pop rock; synth-pop; post-hardcore; metalcore (early)
- Years active: 2006–present
- Labels: Out of Line; Hopeless; Rise; StandBy
- Members: ER White; Bradley Walden
- Past members: Chris Roberts; Mike Bryant; Chris Roetter; Madison Stolzer; Jonny Craig; Lukas Koszewski; Jonas Ladekjaer; Will Sowers; Jordan Stewart; Matthew Marcellus; Robert Joffred

Emarosa (/ɛməˈroʊsə/ EM-ə-ROH-sə) is an American rock band formed in Lexington, Kentucky, in 2006. The band currently consists of lead guitarist and founding member ER White and lead vocalist Bradley Walden, who joined the band in 2013. The group has undergone several line-up changes throughout its career, with lead guitarist ER White being the sole remaining founding member. Originally oriented towards post-hardcore and alternative rock, Emarosa has gravitated towards a more pop rock sound in recent years.

Upon the band's formation, they released one extended play (EP) in 2007, titled This Is Your Way Out, and shortly after, the group underwent significant line-up and sound changes, dropping their metalcore influence and leaning towards a more rock sound. The band released their debut studio album, Relativity (2008), which featured vocalist Jonny Craig and rhythm guitarist Jonas Ladekjaer. Their eponymous second studio album was released in June 2010, to critical acclaim, and was Craig's final album with the group.

Following Craig's departure, the band toured briefly with Tilian Pearson filling in on vocals before entering a period of inactivity. Eventually, Craig was formally replaced by Walden. Emarosa then released their third studio album, Versus, on September 9, 2014, which peaked at No. 61 in the Billboard 200. The band signed to Hopeless Records and released their fourth and fifth studio albums, 131 (2016) and Peach Club (2019). The sixth, Sting, was released in January 2023 through Out of Line Music. Their most recent album, High Horse Heaven, was released on April 24, 2026.

== History ==
=== 2006–07: Formation and This Is Your Way Out ===
Emarosa began with keyboardist Jordan Stewart, drummer Lukas Koszewski and guitarist ER White having the decision of either attending college, or staying in their hometown of Lexington, Kentucky to start a new band. Stewart stated that "There's too much of an itch to do this," regarding the band he helped start in February 2006. The band origins date back to early high school, which was said by keyboardist Jordan Stewart on Indiestar.tv. Stewart states some of the members had been playing in high school before "taking it serious", referring to four of the original members on the current line-up (ER White, Will Sowers, Lukas Koszweski, Jordan Stewart). Emarosa, formed in 2006 as Corsets Are Cages, recorded a three-song demo with vocalist Chris Roberts and rhythm guitarist Mike Bryant, however they left the band. The band recruited Chris Roetter and Madison Stolzer as replacements for the lost members and changed their name to Emarosa. They were signed to StandBy Records to record their 7 track EP This Is Your Way Out, which included a re-recording of the demo of "Utah, But I'm Taller", renamed just "Utah". It was released on May 1, 2007, by StandBy Records through Rise Records because StandBy had no distribution at the time.

Shortly after the release of their debut EP, Chris Roetter and Madison Stolzer left the band. On November 19, 2007, Jonny Craig, former Dance Gavin Dance vocalist, was officially announced as the new vocalist. Jordan Stewart (keyboardist) and Lukas Koszewski (drummer) were interviewed in which they referred to the problems regarding Jonny Craig and the transitions: "In the beginning it was pretty intense. We would receive rather nasty comments and messages on Myspace asking what happened to Chris and why Jonny was no longer with Dance Gavin Dance. Sometimes when we play, kids will think it is funny to throw in remarks about the change and how they liked the old stuff better. The time between us realizing Chris wasn't working out to the time Jonny joined was extremely short. But even with Chris in the band, it was already decided that our full-length wouldn't have as much screaming. We just kept writing the way we had been before parting ways with Chris." Jonas Ladekjaer also joined the band as their new rhythm guitarist, forming their first solid line-up.

=== 2008–09: Relativity ===
On January 26, 2008, Emarosa posted their first official song with Jonny Craig titled, "New Demo" (now known to be "Set It Off Like Napalm"). Two weeks later, the demo of "Pretend. Release. The Close." was put on their player. On May 3, three new post-production songs were added to the MySpace player and the name of the album, Relativity, was revealed. The album was released on July 8, 2008, and received high praise from critics and fans alike. The band embarked on a tour across Canada and the United States with Arise and Ruin and Dead and Divine.

In Emarosa's latest and first video interview with Indiestar, Craig stated that "Set It Off Like Napalm" and "Pretend Release the Close" were "about the life [Craig] was having, [his departure from] Dance Gavin Dance, and how much better [he] was feeling about being in this band [Emarosa]." They were written in one practice session and played live 2 days later. He also said that "Even Bad Men Love Their Mothers" was co-sang by his mother. Boyz II Men was also said to be one of Jonny Craig's main musical influences. Craig states that most of the instrumentals were already completed prior to joining Emarosa, in which Jordan Stewart (keyboardist) says five were completed, to be exact. Jerry Roush, formerly of Sky Eats Airplane and Of Mice & Men, makes an appearance stating he's the new screamer for Emarosa but is joking the entire interview.

Emarosa has been touring for the previous two years with such bands as; Fiora, Akissforjersey, Before Their Eyes, and The Wedding. Emarosa toured with A Skylit Drive, Sky Eats Airplane, and Breathe Carolina the entire month of July. They began another tour in Canada with Canadian headliners Dead and Divine for the month of August and played with Chiodos on August 30, 2008, as a special event in their hometown of Lexington, Kentucky. Emarosa was the headline for the "Rise Records Tour" the entire month of September and first week of October, with support from In Fear and Faith and Attack Attack!. They held their headlining, "The Delicious Tour" alongside Pierce the Veil and Breathe Carolina. Emarosa toured the UK alongside You Me at Six and The Spill Canvas from March 6 until March 13, 2009. A Day to Remember announced their latest US Tour (The Sweet Brag Tour) which included Emarosa along with metalcore bands The Devil Wears Prada and Sky Eats Airplane. The tour stretched from March 14 until May 1, 2009. June 19 – August 1, 2009, Emarosa headlined The Artery Foundation Across the Nation Tour supported by I See Stars, Our Last Night, In Fear and Faith, Burden of a Day, and Broadway.

=== 2010–12: Self-titled second album and Craig's departure ===
Emarosa informed fans that they had begun recording material for their new album via their YouTube channel. On January 2, 2010, the band entered the studio to record their second studio album working with producer Brian McTernan who had contacted Emarosa previously with plans to record their second album. While recording the band posted updates for fans from the studio which can be seen on their Tumblr blog.

The album was released on June 29, 2010, through Rise Records and received a good amount of praise. In an interview with Punktastic, the band spoke about the overall sound of this album. "I remember during the recording process, ER and I talked a lot about wanting to do more folk/indie stuff for the next record. Really bare bones, mellow and raw." Shrednews said "Emarosa have taken this album to a higher level, with more complex and animated guitar riffs, and pounding drum beats that you will make you headbang without even realizing it."

Craig stated that the band would be traveling to Portland after his solo tour to record a B-side for the self-titled album. He also stated that a version of "The Game Played Right" featuring Modsun would be released in.

While on tour, the band is known to occasionally play "Casablanca" with a guest vocalist. So far Cody Anderson (formerly of In Fear and Faith), Chris Roetter (of Like Moths to Flames, formerly Emarosa and Agraceful, who actually wrote the song), Austin Carlile, Jon Mess (of Dance Gavin Dance), Kyle Tamosaitis (formerly of Burden of a Day), Chris Moore, and Jerry Roush have performed this song alongside the band.

During the summer of 2010, Jonny Craig and Jon Mess both rejoined Dance Gavin Dance (of which they were original members). Although Craig had not announced his plans for his relationship with Emarosa, he concentrated on his work with Dance Gavin Dance whose new album Downtown Battle Mountain II was released March 8, 2011. In Craig's absence Emarosa picked up former Tides of Man touring vocalist, Tilian Pearson. On February 27, 2011, Alternative Press broke the news that Craig had turned himself into detox, stemming from reports of Twitter scams and from a longtime addiction.

On April 11, Alternative Press announced that Craig had been kicked out of Emarosa. The band stated that "as of today, Jonny Craig is no longer a member of Emarosa. This decision has been a hard one to make, but we feel it is in the best interest for the band going forward." Tilian Pearson, formerly of Tides of Man, filled in for Craig for 2011's remaining tour dates. According to an Alternative Press interview with the band, their ideal vocalist would not be like Craig tone wise. Stewart states "We're not looking for Jonny Craig 2.0. We just want to find someone who can bring something unique to the band."

=== 2013–17: Versus, line-up changes and 131 ===
On April 6, 2013, the band posted that they were still looking for a new vocalist. Bassist Will Sowers stated that the band will release a new album in the summer of 2012, although this did not materialize.

On August 15, Emarosa stated that pre-production for their third studio album had begun and confirmed that the album had been tracked in December and would feature Letlive's vocalist Jason Aalon Butler as a guest vocalist on one of the tracks. It was rumored that Pearson had joined the band on a full-time basis, but was later discredited by Pearson himself. However, in December 2013, a demo song from their sessions with Tilian called "Supercow" was leaked on Tumblr and YouTube. Coincidentally, Tilian eventually replaced Craig in his former band, Dance Gavin Dance. On March 28, 2014, the band posted a new video that featured studio interviews and a new song preview, announcing that the new album would be titled Versus. On April 24, the band released the first single, "Mad". According to vocalist Bradley Walden, the album would be released on September 9, 2014.

Emarosa toured in support of Versus with Pvris, Beautiful Bodies and Too Close to Touch. A music video for the "I'll Just Wait" was released on September 18, 2014. On September 19, during an interview with Alternative Press, frontman Bradley Walden finally gave the statement of the departure of members Lukas Koszewski (drums, percussion) and Jonas Ladekjaer (rhythm guitar, backing vocals), with them saying that Koszewski left to pursue a modeling career and Ladekjaer left to go back to school. Walden indicated that there was no animosity between the band and its departing members.

In December 2015, the band's updated Facebook information showed its new member line-up featuring Matthew Marcellus who has toured with the band since 2014. Founding bassist, Will Sowers, left the band after accepting a job and returning to school. On January 19, 2016, Emarosa announced they had begun recording for their next album. They released their fourth studio album, 131, on July 8, 2016, through Hopeless Records. It was led by the single "Cloud 9", which was released on April 28, 2016.

=== 2018–24: Peach Club, line-up changes and Sting ===
On October 17, 2018, Emarosa announced their fifth studio album, Peach Club, which was released on February 8, 2019, via Hopeless Records. The lead single, "Givin' Up", was released on November 16, 2018. Another single, "Don't Cry", was released on January 8, 2019. Peach Club ventures towards pop, synth-pop, and pop rock elements, further departing from the group's early post-hardcore sound.

On March 25, 2019, it was announced that Emarosa would embark on the third leg of 'The Midnight World Tour' alongside Set It Off, Broadside, and later Selfish Things. They toured across 25 cities in the United States between June and July 2019. On November 18, the band released the single "Ready to Love" and its corresponding music video.

On July 1, 2020, the band were reportedly dropped from their label, Hopeless Records, and by their management, Roc Nation, following allegations of sexual misconduct that surfaced against vocalist, Bradley Walden. On August 28, Walden denied the allegations made against him. On March 9, 2021, the band announced on social media that they are working on new material for their upcoming sixth studio album.

On April 27, 2022, the band released their first new single in nearly three years, "Preach", along with a music video. It was also revealed that the band had reverted to a duo, now consisting entirely of Walden and White. On July 6, the band unveiled a second single, "Attention". On September 15, the band released their third single of the year, "Stay", and its corresponding music video. At the same time, they officially announced that their sixth studio album, Sting, would be released on January 27, 2023, whilst also revealing the album cover and the track list. On November 11, two months before the album release, Emarosa released the fourth and final single "Again".

In May 2023, the band played an EU/UK tour including a performance at Slam Dunk festival. In September–October 2023, Emarosa played "The Halloween Havoc" US Tour. In September–October 2024, the band toured "American Deja Vu Tour" celebrating a 10-year anniversary of their album Versus, supported by Val Astaire and Laur Elle.

=== 2025–present: High Horse Heaven ===
On September 4, 2025, Emarosa released the first single "The Edge", along with a music video. On October 16, the second single, "Cherry Coke", arrived. On December 8, 2025, the third single, "Good Enough", was released. The band also announced their seventh studio album, High Horse Heaven, released on April 24, 2026.

In February 2026, the band was announced as part of the lineup for the Louder Than Life music festival in Louisville, scheduled to take place in September.

== Band members ==
Current

- ER White – lead guitar (2006–present); rhythm guitar (2014–2016, 2022–present)
- Bradley Walden – lead vocals (2013–present)

Former

- Chris Roberts – lead vocals (2006)
- Mike Bryant – rhythm guitar (2006)
- Chris Roetter – lead vocals (2006–2007)
- Madison Stolzer – rhythm guitar (2006–2007)
- Jonny Craig – lead vocals (2007–2011)
- Lukas Koszewski – drums (2006–2014)
- Jonas Ladekjaer – rhythm guitar (2007–2014)
- Will Sowers – bass (2006–2016)
- Jordan Stewart – keyboards (2006–2018)
- Matthew Marcellus – rhythm guitar, backing vocals (2016–2022; touring member 2014–2016)
- Robert Joffred – bass, backing vocals (2018–2022; touring member 2016–2018)

Touring

- Shawn Gray – bass (2006)
- Tilian Pearson – lead vocals (2011)
- Branden Morgan – drums (2014–2015)
- Connor Denis – drums (2015–2016)
- Brent Caltagirone – drums (2016–2017)
- Kyle Adams – drums (2017–2019)
- Justin Nace – drums (2019)
- Destin Johnson – drums (2019–2022)

Timeline

== Discography ==
=== Albums ===
Year	Title	Label	Chart positions		
Year	Title	Label	US	US Indie	US Heat
2008	Relativity	Rise	191	33	15
2010	Emarosa	Rise	69	9	—
2014	Versus	Rise	61	15	—
2016	131	Hopeless	132	7	—
2019	Peach Club	Hopeless	137	2	—
2023	Sting	Out of Line	—	—	—
2026	High Horse Heaven	Out of Line	—	—	—

=== EPs ===
- This Is Your Way Out (2007, StandBy/Rise)
- Versus Reimagined (July 25, 2015, Rise)
- 131 Reimagined (September 15, 2017, Hopeless)

=== Demos ===
- 2006 Demo (released as Corsets Are Cages) (2006, self-released)

1. "Jesus Plays a Firebird"
2. "Too Close for Missiles, I'm Switching to Guns"
3. "Utah, But I'm Taller"

- Emarosa Demos (contained two demos that did not make the cut for the self-titled) (2010, unreleased)

1. "Share the Sunshine Young Blood"
2. "Live It. Love It. Lust It."
3. "I Still Feel Her, Part IV"
4. "We Are Life"
5. "Truth Hurts While Laying on Your Back"
6. "Pretend.Relive.Regret."
7. "The Game Played Right"
8. "The Weight of Love Blinds Eyes"
9. "Untitled #2"
10. "A Toast to the Future Kids!"
11. "Untitled #1"
12. "Broken vs. the Way We Were Born"

- 2011 Demo (w/ Tilian Pearson) (2011, unreleased)

1. "Mamba"
2. "Moonraker"
3. "Supercow"
4. "Forest Whimsical"
