= Glass Cloud =

American metalcore band

Background information
- Origin: Hampton, Virginia, U.S.
- Genres: Progressive metalcore
- Years active: 2011–2015
- Labels: Equal Vision, Basick
- Past members: Chad Hasty; Jared Land; Jerry Roush; Joshua Travis; Phil Lockett; Josh Miller
- Website: facebook.com/glasscloud

Glass Cloud was an American metalcore band from Hampton, Virginia, formed by Jerry Roush, Joshua Travis, Travis Sykes, and Chad Hasty in late 2011. Roush was formerly the vocalist of Sky Eats Airplane and Of Mice & Men, while Travis was the guitarist for The Tony Danza Tapdance Extravaganza.

The band released their debut album, The Royal Thousand, in July 2012 via Equal Vision Records in the US and Basick Records in the UK. An EP, Perfect War Forever, was released in October 2013 via Equal Vision Records.

== History ==
=== Formation (2011) ===
Jerry Roush had been talking about a new project entitled Glass Cloud for months on his personal Formspring account. In November 2011, he announced on the Glass Cloud YouTube account that the members would include bassist Travis Sykes, and drummer Chad Hasty, both childhood friends of Roush. The band's guitarist was kept a secret until later, when it was revealed to be Joshua Travis of The Tony Danza Tapdance Extravaganza. It was announced December, 2011 that Equal Vision Records had signed the band and they were currently in the studio, recording their debut album, The Royal Thousand, set for a mid-year release.

=== The Royal Thousand and tour activity (2012–2013) ===
The band released their first single, "White Flag", on YouTube March 2, 2012. The band played their first show at Never Say Never Festival in Mission, Texas March 13, 2012. Their setlist included their recently released single, "White Flag" and other unreleased songs from their upcoming album. Shortly after Never Say Never, the band released singles, "White Flag" and "Counting Sheep" from their upcoming debut album on a double single entitled Glass Cloud – Single via iTunes. In April 2012, it was announced Glass Cloud would be participating in the "Scream It Like You Mean It 2012" tour with bands like Attack Attack!, We Came As Romans, The Acacia Strain, Oceano, amongst others. On July 3, 2012, the band's debut album, The Royal Thousand was released and Glass Cloud performed their CD release show in their hometown. The band appeared on the summer "Scream It Like You Mean It 2012" tour (July–September 2012) as scheduled and also participated in the fall Alternative Press Tour 2012 (October–November 2012). During this tour, the band was involved in a serious accident in Oregon on November 10, 2012 when their tour van and trailer landed on its side due to snowy conditions, though the band emerged with no serious injuries. To begin 2013, the band released their cover of the 1980s hit "Everybody Wants To Rule The World" by Tears For Fears. The song is included on the Take Action Compilation: Volume 11. The band then provided support to Silverstein on the "This Is How The Wind Shifts Tour" (January–March 2013); and participated in the "Road To Metal Fest III Tour" with After the Burial (April 2013), the "Canadian Forgiveness Tour" with Veil of Maya (April–May 2013), and direct support to Volumes (May 2013) on an untitled west coast leg. Glass Cloud's single, "Ivy & Wine", was featured as part of Equal Vision Records' New Sounds 2013, Vol. 2 EP compilation via iTunes on April 9, 2013. On May 20, 2013, the band revealed their first European tour providing support to Blessthefall on their "United Kingdom 2013" headliner (October 3–10, 2013) with additional support from Oceans Ate Alaska. They later had to pull out of the European tour due to logistical issues.

=== Perfect War Forever EP, departure of Chad Hasty and Travis Sykes (2013–2015) ===
On August 6, 2013, Jerry Roush announced that their upcoming untitled EP was complete, and was recorded at Eleven18 Studios in Chesapeake, Virginia. The band provided direct support to The Chariot on their "Farewell Tour" (October - November 2013) with other support from Birds in Row, To The Wind, and Rebuker. The band was involved in a serious accident during this tour while in Wyoming (October 30, 2013), however no one was injured. They went on to finish the tour by sharing The Chariot's transportation. The band announced it would release new music, "Perfect War Forever", on September 27, 2013. On September 27, 2013, the band released the single "Trapped Like Rats" and announced Perfect War Forever EP was scheduled for an October 22, 2013 release. The band released the second track from the EP entitled "How To Survive Suicide" via Alternative Press' website on October 11, 2013; and provided direct support to Periphery and Born of Osiris on October 12, 2013 at The Norva in Norfolk, Virginia. This was the first time their new songs were played live. On October 18, 2013, Perfect War Forever EP was streamed in its entirety via GuitarWorld.com. On October 22, 2013, Perfect War Forever EP was released as scheduled, digitally via iTunes and hard copy via the band's website.

On June 17, 2014, Glass Cloud announced that Travis Sykes and Chad Hasty had left the band. Hasty and Sykes made efforts toward releasing material as a new band, and went on to tour with post-hardcore band Glassjaw.

On February 16, 2015, Joshua Travis posted a video consisting of editing software for a new album on Instagram with the hashtag '#GC', also stating in the comments, "If it doesn't come out this year- I passed away before it was fully completed."

As of 2016, Travis and drummer Josh Miller have joined Emmure.

== Band members ==
=== Past members ===
- Jerry Roush – lead vocals (ex-Sky Eats Airplane, ex-Of Mice & Men) (2011–2015)
- Joshua Travis – guitars (The Tony Danza Tapdance Extravaganza, ex-Emmure, ex-When Knives Go Skyward, ex-The Goddamn Rodeo) (2011–2015)
- Chad Hasty – drums (Glassjaw) (2011–2014)
- Travis Sykes – bass, backing vocals (ex-Glassjaw) (2011–2014)

Live musicians

- Phil Lockett – bass, backing vocals (ex-Emmure, ex-The Tony Danza Tapdance Extravaganza) (2014–2015)
- Josh Miller – drums (Chelsea Grin, Darko US, ex-Spite, ex-Emmure) (2014–2015)
- Dane Markanson – guitars (2014)

== Discography ==
Albums

List of studio albums, with selected chart positions
Album	Details	Peak chart positions		
Album	Details	US Heat.	US Indie.	US Hard Rock
The Royal Thousand	Released: July 10, 2012; Label: Equal Vision, Basick; Formats: CD, digital download	5	42	21

EPs

List of EPs, with selected chart positions
EP	Details	Peak chart positions		
EP	Details	US Heat.	US Indie.	US Hard Rock
Perfect War Forever	Released: October 22, 2013; Label: Equal Vision; Formats: CD, digital download	3	27	13

Singles

Year	Album	Songs included	Label
2012	Glass Cloud – Single	"White Flag" "Counting Sheep"	Equal Vision
2013	Trapped Like Rats	"Trapped Like Rats"	Equal Vision

== Videography ==
- "Ivy & Wine" (2012)
- "If He Dies, He Dies" (2012)
- "She Is Well and Nothing Can Be Ill" (2012)

== Concert tours ==
- Scream it Like You Mean It 2012- Attack Attack, We Came as Romans, Woe is Me, Abandon All Ships, Texas in July, Like Moths to Flames, In Fear & Faith, Close to Home, Secrets, Glass Cloud, At the Skylines
- The Alternative Press Tour- Miss May I, The Ghost Inside, Like Moths to Flames, The Amity Affliction, Glass Cloud
- This is How the Wind Shifts Tour- Silverstein, Like Moths to Flames, Secrets, Glass Cloud, Issues
- The Canadian Forgiveness Tour- Veil of Maya, The Contortionist, Glass Cloud, Beyond the Shore
- UK 2013 Tour- Blessthefall, Glass Cloud, Oceans Ate Alaska
- The Road to New England Metal & Hardcore Festival- After the Burial, Within the Ruins, The Contortionist, Glass Cloud, City in the Sea
- Spring 2014 Tour- Letlive., Architects, Glass Cloud, I The Mighty
- MerchNow Tour- Scale the Summit, Glass Cloud, ERRA, Reflections, Monuments
- Our Endless War Tour- Whitechapel, Upon A Burning Body, Glass Cloud
