= Jesús M. Toribio =

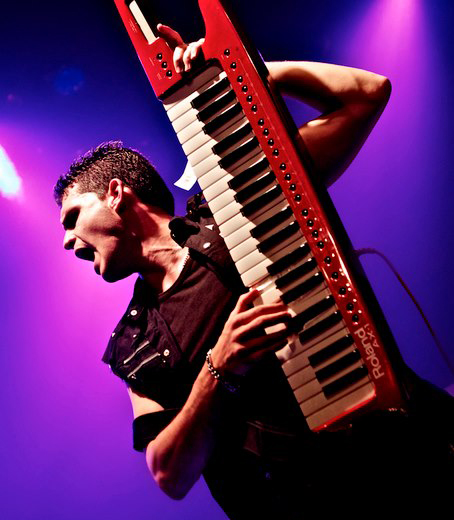
- Jesús M. Toribio in 2012

Background information
- Born: Jesús Martín Toribio; 10 November 1988 (age 37)
- Origin: Madrid, Spain
- Genres: Power metal Symphonic power metal Classical Music
- Occupations: Pianist, keyboardist, composer, lyricist
- Instruments: Keyboards, piano, keytar.
- Years active: 2010–present
- Labels: Sonic Attack, Hydrant Music

Jesús M. Toribio (born 10 November 1988 in Madrid, Spain) is a keyboardist, pianist and composer. He joined the Spanish power metal band Phoenix Rising in late 2010, and currently resides in Alcorcón, Spain, when not on tour.

== Early life ==
He began studying music at age 5, primarily pushed by his parents and grandfather. Years later, he entered the Rodolffo Halffter Music Conservatory of Móstoles to study music theory, piano and composition. In 2011, he earned his Bachelor of Music in music performance, music theory and composition.

== Career ==
During that period, his musical interest led him to get involved with some unstable bands until 2010, when he joined the symphonic power metal band, Quinta Enmienda, with whom he had already collaborated on their first album Ne Bis in Idem.

In 2011, Japanese Multinational Corporation Korg interviewed him after including him in a list of top artists featuring Korg instruments, publishing a brief biography on their website.

During the first part of 2012, Quinta Enmienda switched its name to Phoenix Rising after signing a three-album deal with German label Sonic Attack. In March 2012, the very first album as Phoenix Rising, MMXII, was released. Toribio participated both in the writing and in the production process.

He is currently working on the new album which will be released in early 2014.

== Discography ==
=== With Phoenix Rising ===
- MMXII (Double CD) (2012)
- Versus (2014)

=== Guest appearances ===
- Quinta Enmienda – Ne Bis in Idem (2010)
