= 131 (album) =

Studio album by Emarosa
- Released: July 8, 2016
- Studios: South By Sea Studios, Nashville, Tennessee, U.S.
- Genre: Alternative rock
- Length: 39:41
- Label: Hopeless
- Producer: Casey Bates

Emarosa chronology
Versus (2014)	131 (2016)	Peach Club (2019)

Singles from 131
- 1. "Cloud 9" Released: April 28, 2016

131 is the fourth studio album by American rock band Emarosa. The album was released on July 8, 2016 through Hopeless Records and was produced by Casey Bates. It is the band's first album to be released on this label. It is also the last album to feature founding keyboardist Jordan Stewart and the first to feature rhythm guitarist Matthew Marcellus, who has been touring with the band since 2014. The sculpture image featuring on the album cover and also on other merchandise to promote the album is made by artist Beth Cavener.

131 shows Emarosa completing the move to alternative rock that they began with Versus two years earlier, when Bradley Walden joined as frontman and co-songwriter. None of the band's original post-hardcore style is present here.

== Track listing ==
No.	Title	Length
1.	"Hurt"	2:52
2.	"One Car Garage"	3:23
3.	"Sure"	3:54
4.	"Miracle"	3:47
5.	"Cloud 9"	3:35
6.	"Helpless"	3:24
7.	"Porcelain"	4:30
8.	"Never" (featuring Amy Meeko)	2:42
9.	"Young Lonely" (featuring Jason Vena of Acceptance)	3:17
10.	"Blue"	2:43
11.	"Re"	5:29
Total length:		39:41

== Personnel ==
Credits adapted from AllMusic.

Emarosa

- Bradley Walden – lead vocals
- ER White – lead guitar
- Matthew Marcellus – rhythm guitar, backing vocals
- Jordan Stewart – keyboards, programming

Additional musicians

- Ryan Kienle – bass
- Connor Denis – drums
- Amy Meeko – guest vocals on track 8
- Jason Vena of Acceptance – guest vocals on track 9
- Sean Mackin – strings

Additional personnel

- Casey Bates – production, engineering, mixing, mastering
- Jeremiah Sinopoli – engineering
- Beth Cavener – inspiration
- Chris Hansen – artwork, layout
- Megan Thompson – cover art

== Charts ==
Chart (2016)	Peak position
US Billboard 200	132
US Independent Albums (Billboard)	7
