= The Sound of Symmetry =

EP by Sky Eats Airplane
- Released: April 13, 2010
- Recorded: 2009
- Genres: Metalcore; post-hardcore; electronicore
- Length: 11:06
- Label: Equal Vision
- Producer: Taylor Larson

Sky Eats Airplane chronology
Sky Eats Airplane (2008)	The Sound of Symmetry (2010)

Professional ratings
Review scores
Source	Rating
Alter the Press	4/5 stars

The Sound of Symmetry is the only EP and final release by electronicore band Sky Eats Airplane. It is also the only release by the group with a new lineup since their completed set of members, which consists of Bryan Zimmerman on lead vocals, Elliot Coleman on bass guitar and vocals, and Travis Orbin on drums. The band's line-up also consists of Zack Ordway (lead guitarist, who was featured on the band's second and self-titled album) and Lee Duck, the band's only remaining founding member.

Currently two songs from the EP have been uploaded to the band's MySpace and are available to listen to: "Sound of Symmetry" and "The Contour". The whole EP can be bought from the iTunes Store.

== Track list ==
No.	Title	Length
1.	"The Contour"	3:48
2.	"Sound of Symmetry"	4:02
3.	"Motion Sickness"	3:16
Total length:		11:06

== Personnel ==
Sky Eats Airplane

- Bryan Zimmerman – lead vocals
- Zack Ordway – lead guitar
- Lee Duck – rhythm guitar, keyboards, synthesizers, electronics, programming, backing vocals
- Elliot Coleman – bass, backing vocals
- Travis "The Orbinator" Orbin – drums, percussion

Additional

- Taylor Larson – production, mixing
- Paul Leavitt – mixing
- Will Quinnell – mastering
- Kyle Crawford – art direction, design
