= Everything Perfect on the Wrong Day =

Studio album by Sky Eats Airplane
- Released: August 6, 2006
- Recorded: Early 2006
- Studios: Brack's Bedroom, Fort Worth, Texas
- Genres: Nintendocore; post-hardcore; electronicore
- Length: 31:00
- Labels: Thriving; Tragic Hero
- Producers: Lee Duck; Brack Cantrell

Sky Eats Airplane chronology
Everything Perfect on the Wrong Day (2006)	Sky Eats Airplane (2008)

Alternative Cover
- Re-release cover

Everything Perfect on the Wrong Day is the first album by Texan post-hardcore and electronic band Sky Eats Airplane. The album was recorded in early 2006 was originally released on August 6 through Thriving Records. The album was re-released on November 20, 2007 through Tragic Hero Records.

== Track listing ==
All tracks are written by Brack Cantrell and Lee Duck.

No.	Title	Length
1.	"By All Means, Captain"	1:16
2.	"Patterns"	1:34
3.	"Honest Hitchhikers Asking for Cash Handouts"	4:11
4.	"Exit Row"	1:52
5.	"Giants in the Ocean"	5:41
6.	"She Is Just a Glitch"	4:45
7.	"The Opposite Viewed in Real Time"	3:14
8.	"Everything Perfect on the Wrong Day"	3:35
9.	"The Messenger"	4:47
Total length:		31:00

== Personnel ==
Sky Eats Airplane

- Brack Cantrell – lead vocals, rhythm guitar, bass guitar, keyboards, synthesizers, programming
- Lee Duck – vocals, lead guitar, drums, percussion, keyboards, synthesizers, programming

Production

- Produced by members Brack Cantrell and Lee Duck

== Reception ==
Professional ratings
Review scores
Source	Rating
Allmusic	2.5/5 stars
Exclaim!	Recommended
Punk News	1/5 stars
Ultimate Guitar	8.8/10

Upon its release, Everything Perfect on the Wrong Day received mixed reviews from music critics.

AllMusic reviewer Eduardo Rivadavia gave the album a mixed review, comparing the album's sound to Horse the Band and Genghis Tron. Rivadavia criticized the album's short songs and lack of cohesion, but did say the album was intriguing. Punk News reviewer Matt Wheilan was highly critical of the album, calling the mixing of metalcore with electronic elements "a poor concept being poorly executed." Wheilan specifically criticized the track "She Is Just a Glitch," calling the beat boring, the synth string useless, and the lyrics clichéd.

A positive review came from Exclaim!'s Dave Synyard, who praised the band's use of electronic drums. Synyard concluded his review by stating "if you're a little tired of the same old, Sky Eats Airplane will hit reset for you."

== Vinyl release ==
On August 14, 2020, Sky Eats Airplane posted on Facebook for the first time in 8 years to announce that the album was being pressed on vinyl.

"We’re excited to tell you that our old friends at Tragic Hero Records are pressing a limited quantity of 'Everything Perfect on the Wrong Day' to vinyl for the first time ever," They wrote. "It’s amazing to see that this album still resonates with fans and musicians alike, even after 14 years."

The vinyl's release date was November 27, 2020.
