= Peach Club =

Studio album by Emarosa
- Released: February 8, 2019
- Recorded: 2018
- Genres: Pop; pop rock; synth-pop; dance-pop; new wave; alternative rock
- Length: 36:41
- Label: Hopeless
- Producer: Courtney Ballard

Emarosa chronology
131 (2016)	Peach Club (2019)	Sting (2023)

Singles from Peach Club
- 1. "Givin' Up" Released: November 16, 2018; 2. "Don't Cry" Released: January 8, 2019; 3. "Cautious" Released: January 30, 2019; 4. "Get Back Up" Released: February 6, 2019

Peach Club is the fifth studio album by American rock band Emarosa. The album was released on February 8, 2019, through Hopeless Records and was produced by Courtney Ballard. It serves as a follow-up to the band's fourth studio album, 131 (2016) and shows the band's venture towards pop, synth-pop, and pop rock elements, further departing from their early post-hardcore and alternative rock sound.

The lead single, "Givin' Up", was released on November 16, 2018. The second single, "Don't Cry", was released on January 8, 2019. Two more singles, "Cautious" and "Get Back Up", were released to promote the album. In support of the album, the band toured with other groups such as Hands Like Houses and Set It Off and embarked on a headlining 2019 tour.

It is the band's first album to feature bassist Robert Joffred and also the final album released by the band through Hopeless Records, who appear to have dropped the band following allegations that surfaced against vocalist, Bradley Walden.

== Background ==
Following the release of Emarosa's fourth studio album, 131 (2016), the band toured with other musical groups including Silverstein, A Lot Like Birds, and Jule Vera, among others. In 2018, the band began writing and recording their fifth studio album. Prior to the album's release, the band toured as support on Hands Like Houses' U.S. tour from November 10 to December 12, 2018, alongside Devour the Day.

== Release and promotion ==
On October 17, 2018, Emarosa announced Peach Club, the release date, and limited pre-order bundles. The lead single, "Givin' Up", was released on November 16, 2018, along with its music video.

On January 8, 2019, the band released the album's second single, "Don't Cry", alongside its animated video, which premiered on PopCrush. On January 30, the band released the third single "Cautious". On February 6, the fourth single, "Get Back Up", was released.

== Touring ==
In support of Peach Club, the band embarked on a headlining 2019 European and Russian tour in January.

The group is set to tour as support on the North American leg of American rock band Set It Off's The Midnight World Tour from June 11 to July 18, 2019, alongside Broadside and Lizzy Farrall.

== Track listing ==
No.	Title	Length
1.	"Givin' Up"	3:10
2.	"Don't Cry"	3:11
3.	"Cautious"	3:15
4.	"Get Back Up"	3:10
5.	"So Bad"	3:29
6.	"Help You Out"	3:42
7.	"XO"	2:33
8.	"Hell of It"	3:27
9.	"Comfortable"	3:25
10.	"Iw2dwy"	3:11
11.	"Wait, Stay"	4:00
Total length:		36:41

== Personnel ==
Credits adapted from AllMusic.

Emarosa

- Bradley Walden – lead vocals
- ER White – lead guitar
- Matthew Marcellus – rhythm guitar, backing vocals
- Robert Joffred – bass, backing vocals

Additional personnel

- Courtney Ballard – production, mixing
- Alexander Hitchens, Allen Lewis and Jared Poythress – composition
- Jason Mageau – management
- Jessica Severn – art direction, design, illustrations

== Charts ==
Chart (2019)	Peak position
US Billboard 200	137
US Top Rock Albums (Billboard)	20
