= Perfect War Forever =

EP by Glass Cloud
- Released: October 22, 2013
- Recorded: Eleven18 Studios
- Genre: Metalcore, djent
- Length: 21:18
- Label: Equal Vision
- Producer: Glass Cloud

Glass Cloud chronology
The Royal Thousand (2012)	Perfect War Forever (2013)

Professional ratings
Review scores
Source	Rating
AllMusic	3.5/5 stars
Alternative Press	4/5 stars

Perfect War Forever is an EP by metalcore band Glass Cloud. It was released on October 22, 2013 through Equal Vision Records. It was tracked in part at Eleven18 Studios (Now Flagship Studios) in Hampton Roads.

Some letters on the album cover are in red while some are just white. When connected, the red letters spell out the phrase: “fear forever”.

== Track listing ==
No.	Title	Length
1.	"Trapped Like Rats"	4:36
2.	"I Dug a Grave"	4:44
3.	"How to Survive Suicide"	4:37
4.	"Soul Is Dead"	3:59
5.	"Lilac"	3:22
Total length:		21:18

== Personnel ==
Glass Cloud

- Jerry Roush - vocals
- Joshua Travis – guitar
- Travis Sykes – bass, backing vocals
- Chad Hasty – drums
