= The Royal Thousand =

Studio album by Glass Cloud
- Released: July 10, 2012
- Recorded: November – December 2011, Lambesis Studios, Escondido, California
- Genre: Metalcore, progressive metal, post-hardcore
- Length: 39:45
- Label: Equal Vision (USA), Basick (UK)
- Producer: Joshua Travis

Glass Cloud chronology
The Royal Thousand (2012)	Perfect War Forever (2013)

Singles from The Royal Thousand
- 1. "White Flag" Released: March 2, 2012; 2. "Counting Sheep" Released: March 20, 2012

Professional ratings
Review scores
Source	Rating
Absolutepunk.net	(70%) link
Alternative Press	(#289.2)
Sputnikmusic	link
Ultimate-Guitar.com	link

The Royal Thousand is the only studio album by the metalcore band Glass Cloud. The album was recorded in late 2011 at Lambesis Studios, in Escondido, California and was released on July 10, 2012.

The album was produced by Joshua Travis, and mixed and mastered by Will Putney at The Machine Shop in Weehawken, New Jersey.

== Track listing ==
No.	Title	Length
1.	"White Flag"	4:20
2.	"If He Dies, He Dies"	3:58
3.	"Falling in Style"	3:07
4.	"Ivy & Wine"	4:29
5.	"Prelude for a Ghost"	1:47
6.	"All Along"	4:10
7.	"She Is Well and Nothing Can Be Ill"	3:58
8.	"Counting Sheep"	3:41
9.	"Memorandum"	5:23
10.	"From May to Now"	4:52
Total length:		39:45

== Personnel ==
Glass Cloud

- Jerry Roush – vocals
- Joshua Travis – guitar
- Travis Sykes – bass, backing vocals, lyrics
- Chad Hasty – drums

Production

- Joshua Travis – producer
- Will Putney – mixing, mastering

Additional Personnel

- Evan Leake – artwork
- Corinne Alexandra – additional photography
