= Emarosa (album) =

Studio album by Emarosa
- Released: June 29, 2010
- Recorded: January–February 2010
- Studios: Salad Days Studio, Baltimore, Maryland, U.S.; Interlace Audio Recording Studios, Portland, Oregon
- Genres: Post-hardcore; melodic hardcore; alternative rock; emo
- Length: 38:11
- Label: Rise
- Producer: Brian McTernan

Emarosa chronology
Relativity (2008)	Emarosa (2010)	Versus (2014)

Emarosa is the second studio album by American rock band Emarosa. It was released on June 29, 2010 through Rise Records. The album was produced by Brian McTernan, and it is also the last album to feature vocalist Jonny Craig.

Professional ratings
Review scores
Source	Rating
Alternative Press	4/5 stars
Mind Equals Blown	favorable
Review Rinse Repeat	3/5 stars
Rock Sound	9/10 stars

== Track listing ==
No.	Title	Length
1.	"A Toast to the Future Kids!"	3:48
2.	"Pretend.Relive.Regret"	4:09
3.	"Share the Sunshine Young Blood"	3:00
4.	"Truth Hurts While Laying on Your Back"	3:40
5.	"Live It. Love It. Lust It"	3:52
6.	"The Game Played Right"	4:04
7.	"Broken vs. the Way We Were Born"	4:31
8.	"I Still Feel Her Pt. 4"	3:26
9.	"The Weight of Love Blinds Eyes"	3:35
10.	"We Are Life"	4:00
Total length:		38:11

An unreleased 2010 demo of the project contained two additional tracks:

1. "Share the Sunshine Young Blood"
2. "Live It. Love It. Lust It"
3. "I Still Feel Her, Part IV"
4. "We Are Life"
5. "Truth Hurts While Laying on Your Back"
6. "Pretend.Relive.Regret"
7. "The Game Played Right"
8. "The Weight of Love Blinds Eyes"
9. "Untitled #2"
10. "A Toast to the Future Kids!"
11. "Untitled #1"
12. "Broken vs. the Way We Were Born"

== Personnel ==
Emarosa

- Jonny Craig – lead vocals
- ER White – lead guitar
- Jonas Ladekjaer – rhythm guitar
- Will Sowers – bass
- Lukas Koszewski – drums
- Jordan Stewart – keyboards

Additional personnel

- Brian McTernan – production, mixing
- Kris Crummett – mastering, vocal engineering
- Paul Leavitt – mastering
- Eric Rushing and Sean Heydorn (The Artery Foundation) – management
- Jeremy Holgersen (The Agency Group) – booking
- Glenn Thomas (We Are Synapse) – art direction, design

== Charts ==
Chart (2010)	Peak position
Billboard 200	69
Billboard Independent Albums	9
Billboard Rock Albums	17
Billboard Alternative Albums	10
Billboard Internet Albums	11
