= Relativity (Emarosa album) =

Studio album by Emarosa
- Released: July 8, 2008
- Recorded: 2008
- Studios: Interlace Audio Recording Studios, Portland, Oregon, U.S.
- Genres: Post-hardcore; melodic hardcore; alternative rock; emo
- Length: 43:11
- Label: Rise
- Producer: Kris Crummett

Emarosa chronology
This Is Your Way Out (2007)	Relativity (2008)	Emarosa (2010)

Relativity is the debut studio album by American rock band Emarosa. It was released on July 8, 2008 through Rise Records. Relativity was produced by Kris Crummett, producer of other bands such as Drop Dead, Gorgeous and Fear Before, whom Jonny Craig worked with on Dance Gavin Dance's debut album the year before.

This is the band's first recording with vocalist Jonny Craig during a period away from Dance Gavin Dance. It is also the first album to feature rhythm guitarist Jonas Ladekjaer, formerly of Sea of Treachery. The album peaked at No. 191 on the Billboard 200 as well as 33 on the Top Independent Albums.

An unreleased demo of the project included alternative versions of the tracks "Pretend.Release.The Close" and "Set It Off Like Napalm".

== Track listing ==
All lyrics are written by ER White and Jonny Craig; all music is composed by Emarosa.

No.	Title	Length
1.	"The Past Should Stay Dead"	4:33
2.	"Just Another Marionette"	4:04
3.	"What's a Clock Without the Batteries?"	3:38
4.	"Heads or Tails? Real or Not"	5:01
5.	"Even Bad Men Love Their Mothers" (featuring Jacqueline Craig)	2:00
6.	"Her Advice Cost Us a Life"	4:34
7.	"Set It Off Like Napalm"	3:06
8.	"Sailing in the Dark Isn't Smart Kid!"	3:16
9.	"Pretend. Release. The Close."	2:59
10.	"It's Cold in the Shade, Let's Move to the Sun..."	1:00
11.	"I Still Feel Her – Part I"	4:32
12.	"A City Called Coma – Part II"	4:22
Total length:		43:11

== Personnel ==
Emarosa

- Jonny Craig – lead vocals
- ER White – lead guitar
- Jonas Ladekjaer – rhythm guitar
- Will Sowers – bass
- Lukas Koszewski – drums
- Jordan Stewart – keyboards

Additional personnel

- Kris Crummett – production, engineering, mixing, mastering, audio engineering, audio production
- Eric Rushing and Brett Bair (The Artery Foundation) – management
- Jeremy Holgersen (The Agency Group) – booking
- Synapse Design – art direction, design
- Roxanne Hartridge – photography
