= Sting (Emarosa album) =

Studio album by Emarosa
- Released: January 27, 2023
- Genres: Pop rock; synth-pop; dance-pop; new wave; synthwave
- Length: 34:03
- Label: Out of Line
- Producer: Courtney Ballard

Emarosa chronology
Peach Club (2019)	Sting (2023)	High Horse Heaven (2026)

Singles from Sting
- 1. "Preach" Released: April 27, 2022; 2. "Attention" Released: July 6, 2022; 3. "Stay" Released: September 15, 2022; 4. "Again" Released: November 11, 2022

Sting is the sixth studio album by American rock band Emarosa. It was released on January 27, 2023, through Out of Line Music and was produced by Courtney Ballard. The album is the band's first studio release with the label.

== Background and promotion ==
On July 1, 2020, the band were reportedly dropped from their label, Hopeless Records, and by their management, Roc Nation, following allegations of sexual misconduct that surfaced against vocalist, Bradley Walden. On August 28, Walden denied the allegations made against him and through further investigations, the statements were proved to be false. On March 9, 2021, the band announced on social media that they are working on new material for the album.

On April 27, 2022, the band released their first new single in nearly three years, "Preach", along with a music video. It was also revealed that the band had reverted to a duo, now consisting entirely of Walden and White. On July 6, the band unveiled a second single, "Attention". On September 15, the band released their third single of the year, "Stay", and its corresponding music video. At the same time, they revealed the album itself, the album cover, the track list, and release date. On November 11, two months before the album release, Emarosa released the fourth and final single "Again".

== Critical reception ==
Professional ratings
Review scores
Source	Rating
Distorted Sound	9/10
Ghost Cult	7/10

The album received positive reviews from critics. Shannon Eacups of Distorted Sound scored the album 9 out of 10 and said: "As a whole this record does exceptionally well by playing on the nostalgic aspect of the 80s with clear influence from Michael Jackson and Tears for Fears mixed with the modernity of artists like The 1975 and Charlie Puth and of course the obvious influence from synthwave as a whole. The guitar work displayed by White is impeccable, from catchy displays of lead hooks to emotionally driven solos that are few and far between but are impactful and memorable when there. Equally, the vocal display from Walden is stunning between the gritty soul of his deeper range and the feathery light high range he places throughout the record. Its only downfall are the short lived saxophone solos which have so much undelivered potential, yet that's a minor inconvenience compared to the record as a whole, which delivers more than it lacks."

Ghost Cult gave the album 7 out of 10 and stated: "Overall, the album leans a bit too heavily on and crawls even further into their revamped Synthwave, the eighties sound. In moments, Walden's vocals blended too much and were too soft and mellow being paired with an already mellow track. Artist's are either condemned for staying too similar or for straying too far from their original sound, however, had the duo toed the line a touch more to make Sting really pack a punch, possibly with a new genre component, more than capable vocal acrobatics, or lyrical/instrumental juxtaposition, it could've rivaled Peach Club. The listener is still left a touch hungry."

== Track listing ==
Adapted from Apple Music.

Sting track listing
No.	Title	Length
1.	"Preach"	3:29
2.	"Attention"	3:21
3.	"Stay"	3:51
4.	"Cinnamon"	3:06
5.	"Forgiveness"	2:23
6.	"INLA"	3:25
7.	"Again"	3:25
8.	"Woman"	3:40
9.	"Rush"	3:06
10.	"Danger"	4:12
Total length:		34:03

== Personnel ==
Credits adapted from Discogs.

Emarosa

- Bradley Walden – vocals
- ER White – guitars

Additional musicians

- Patrick Taylor – bass

Additional personnel

- Courtney Ballard – production, engineering, mixing
- Chris Athens – mastering
