= Phoenix Rising (band) =

Spanish heavy metal band

- Also known as: Phoenix Rising / Fire & Ashes; Quinta Enmienda
- Origin: Alcorcón, Madrid, Spain
- Genres: Heavy metal, power metal, symphonic metal
- Years active: 2007–present
- Labels: Sonic Attack, Hydrant Music
- Members: Miguel González Calvo; Daniel Martínez del Monte; Jesús M. Toribio; Sergio Wild; Iván Méndez
- Past members: Francisco Jesús "Patxi" Quintanilla
- Website: phoenixrisingmetal.com

Phoenix Rising, formerly known as Phoenix Rising / Fire & Ashes, and originally as, Quinta Enmienda is a Spanish symphonic power metal band from Alcorcón, Madrid. Their music is strongly influenced by bands like Stratovarius, Rhapsody of Fire, Galneryus, and Sonata Arctica.

The band was established in 2007 as "Quinta Enmienda", and they released an album, Ne Bis in Idem, with that name in 2010. However, in 2012, after signing a record deal for three albums with the German label Sonic Attack, they switched their name to "Phoenix Rising".

== History ==
=== Formation and Ne bis in idem (2007–2010) ===
The band was established in early 2007 as Quinta Enmienda. In 2008, Quinta Enmienda recorded its very first demo as a result of winning the competition "¿Y tu qué tocas?" and the band started to play live, gaining a good reputation in the local scene.

In September 2009, Quinta Enmienda was chosen to join Saratoga, Muro and Medina Azahara at the stage for the "Javier Gálvez's Tribute Show". In that show the band play live for over 5,000 people. Their convincing performance received the attention of well-known Spanish metal producer Fernando Asensi (Dragonfly, Opera Magna, Delirion). As a result, a lasting relationship was established, and the band went into the studio in February 2010 under his supervision to produce their debut album Ne Bis in Idem. The album was released on 25 May. Yet shortly after the album was released, the only line-up change took place so far with Jesús M. Toribio replacing the former keyboard player. In support of their debut the band performed numerous shows in central Spain, among them three festival highlights: Getafe Sonisphere in 2010 and Power Alive Fest and Granito Rock in front of over 6,000 fans.

=== Rising popularity and MMXII (2011–present) ===
During the first quarter of 2011 Quinta Enmienda began to write songs for their new album, and the high quality of the band's demo recordings convinced Karl Walterbach (ex Noise Records boss and head of Sonic Attack) to get in touch. After intense discussions the band finally decided to switch to an international compatible name with "Phoenix Rising / Fire & Ashes" and to record the new songs in two languages: a Spanish version for the band's domestic market and an English version for the international markets. However the limited edition of the initial release contained both versions in a double CD for the price of one. The result was the concept album MMXII which was released worldwide on 23 March 2012.

In April 2012, Phoenix Rising announced through their website that the band had reached an agreement with the Japanese label Hydrant Music, in order to edit their last album MMXII in Japan. The album was to be released in August and it would contain exclusive bonus tracks for the Japanese market.

Their album, Versus, was released in 2014.

== Members ==
Current

- Miguel González Calvo, vocals and guitar
- Daniel Martínez del Monte, guitar and chorus
- Jesús M. Toribio, piano, keyboards and orchestrations
- Sergio Wild, bass
- Iván Méndez, drums

Former

- Francisco Jesús "Patxi" Quintanilla, keyboards

== Discography ==
Year	Album
2010	Ne Bis in Idem
2012	MMXII (Spanish)
2012	MMXII (English)
2014	Versus
2021	Acta Est Fabula
