= Sky Eats Airplane (album) =

Studio album by Sky Eats Airplane
- Released: July 22, 2008
- Genres: Post-hardcore; electronicore; metalcore
- Length: 43:51
- Label: Equal Vision
- Producer: Brian McTernan

Sky Eats Airplane chronology
Everything Perfect on the Wrong Day (2006)	Sky Eats Airplane (2008)	The Sound of Symmetry (2010)

Professional ratings
Review scores
Source	Rating
Absolutepunk.net	(76%) link
Alternative Press	4.5/5 stars
Under the Gun Review	8.5/10
Scream Magazine	3/6 stars

Sky Eats Airplane is the second and final album by American electronicore band Sky Eats Airplane. The album was recorded in early 2008 with producer Brian McTernan and was released on July 22. The album contains 11 tracks, 8 of which are new and 3 of which that are re-recorded versions of previously released demos. The album is the band's first album as a 5-piece and without former vocalist/programmer Brack Cantrell. It is also the first and last album with vocalist Jerry Roush. Prior to the album's release a video for the first single "Numbers" was made and was released on March 27, 2009.

The album debuted at #172 on The Billboard 200 chart with first week sales of 4,000.

== Track listing ==
No.	Title	Length
1.	"Introduction"	0:37
2.	"Long Walks on Short Bridges"	4:16
3.	"Transparent"	6:02
4.	"Numbers" (feat. Micah Kinard)	3:38
5.	"World Between Us"	4:51
6.	"Photographic Memory"	4:31
7.	"In Retrospect"	3:33
8.	"The Artificial"	5:57
9.	"Disconnected"	3:23
10.	"Machines"	1:22
11.	"Alias"	5:41
Total length:		43:51

== Personnel ==
Sky Eats Airplane

- Jerry Roush – lead vocals
- Zack Ordway – lead guitar, keyboards, programming
- Lee Duck – rhythm guitar, keyboards, synthesizers, electronics, programming, backing vocals
- Johno Erickson – bass
- Kenny Schick – drums, percussion

Additional

- Michah Kinard – additional vocals on track 4
- Brian McTernan – production, engineer, mixing
- Paul Leavitt – digital editing
- Evan Leake – artwork

== Charts ==
Chart (2008)	Peak position
US Billboard 200	172
US Heatseekers Albums (Billboard)	6
US Independent Albums (Billboard)	27
