= Val Astaire =

American musical act

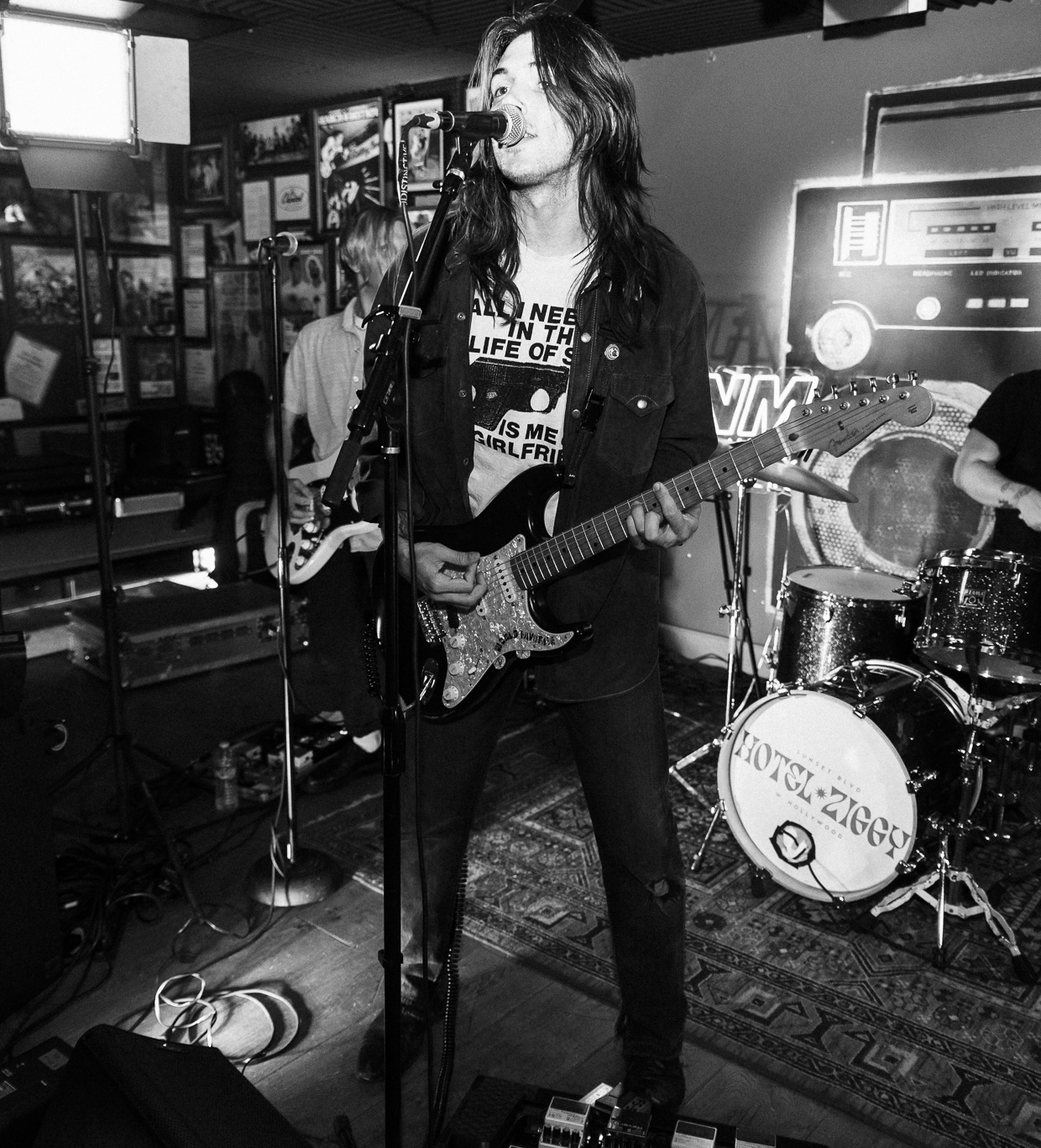
- Val Astaire performing in Los Angeles, California, 2023, by Molly Hudelson

Background information
- Born: Brian Anthony Joyce; March 3, 1989 (age 36); Philadelphia, Pennsylvania, U.S.
- Genres: indie rock; alternative rock; pop rock
- Occupations: Singer; songwriter
- Instruments: Vocals; guitar; bass guitar; drums
- Years active: 2017–present
- Website: valastaire.com

Val Astaire is an American alternative rock act created by multi-instrumentalist and singer-songwriter Brian Anthony Joyce.

== Early life ==
Brian Anthony Joyce was born in Philadelphia, Pennsylvania on March 3, 1989. His interest in music began while watching his father play guitar when he was 8 years old, and attending concerts with his mother. He began recording his own music when he was 13 after his father purchased him a cassette recorder.

After dropping out of college in his late teens, he formed the pop-punk band Major League, which saw the success of 2 EP's and 2 full-length records, as well as multiple national and international tours.

== Music career ==
=== Creation, /// & yellow EP's (2017 - 2018) ===
After disbanding Major League in 2016, the moniker of Val Astaire was created. Having idolized androgynous figures such as David Bowie and Prince, Joyce believed it was more about the artistry than the person behind it. Shortly after he met songwriter and producer Christopher Curran, who helped to shape the sound and direction of the project.

His debut single as Val Astaire, "Blow", was released in February 2017. His second single "The No Funs" was released in early 2018.

Joyce went on to release his debut EP, Yellow, which featured singles "Fall Apart" and "Rebel" in October 2018. Shortly after, he embarked on a United Kingdom and Ireland tour, followed by a winter east coast and midwest US tour to close 2018.

In January 2019, he re-released his first 3 songs that he recorded in an EP titled / / /, which included "Blow", "The No Funs" and "Runway Love".

Val Astaire played Delaware's 93.7 WSTW’s Snow Jam in February 2019 alongside artists O.A.R. and Whitney Woerz.

=== Fever Dreams (2019 - 2020) ===
In March 2019, Joyce entered the studio to record his first full length album at ‘Barber Shop Studios’, and released his first single "Say You Will" along with an accompanying music video in September 2019. The song is a notable contrast from his earlier work, with Atwood Magazine commenting on his "undeniable emotion" and "impressive veracity", and It's All Indie noting his "youthful vocals and talents as a songwriter".

On March 4, 2020, Joyce announced his debut album Fever Dreams, which was released on July 17, 2020. It includes singles "Say You Will, "Kiss", "3am", "When The Lights Go Out" and "Runner".

=== Bad Vibrations (2021) ===
In June of 2021, Joyce released his single Bad Vibrations, with The Honey Pop referring to the song as a "soundtrack to the Summer" and praising the passion and purity of the track.

=== EVERYTHING GOOD MUST HAPPEN SOMEWHERE ELSE (2023 - present) ===
Joyce released his sophomore album under the Val Astaire name on September 8, 2022.

== Musical style ==
Val Astaire's musical style has been described as alternative rock and pop rock, and has cited David Bowie, Beck, The Killers, Tears for Fears and Talking Heads as musical and career influences.

== Discography ==
=== Albums ===
- Fever Dreams, (2020)
- EVERYTHING GOOD MUST HAPPEN SOMEWHERE ELSE, (2023)

=== Extended plays ===
- Yellow, (2018)
- / / /, (2019)

=== Singles ===
Title	Year	Album
"Blow"	2017	/ / /
"The No Funs"	2018	/ / /
"Fall Apart"	2018	Yellow
"Rebel"	2018	Yellow
"Say You Will"	2019	Fever Dreams
"Kiss"	2019	Fever Dreams
"3am"	2020	Fever Dreams
"When The Lights Go Out"	2020	Fever Dreams
"Runner"	2020	Fever Dreams
"Bad Vibrations"	2021	Single
"HOW'S IT GOING TO END?"	2022	EVERYTHING GOOD MUST HAPPEN SOMEWHERE ELSE
"HIGH ON YOU"	2022	EVERYTHING GOOD MUST HAPPEN SOMEWHERE ELSE
"HELL TO PAY"	2023	EVERYTHING GOOD MUST HAPPEN SOMEWHERE ELSE
"EARTH SONG"	2023	EVERYTHING GOOD MUST HAPPEN SOMEWHERE ELSE
"LITTLE ANIMAL"	2023	EVERYTHING GOOD MUST HAPPEN SOMEWHERE ELSE

=== Music videos ===
Title	Year	Director	Ref.
"The No Funs"	2018	Michael Shronk	
"Fall Apart"	2018	James Morano	
"Say You Will"	2019	James Morano	
"Kiss"	2019	James Morano	
"When The Lights Go Out"	2020	Benjamin Lieber	
"HOW'S IT GOING TO END?"	2022	Val Astaire	
"HELL TO PAY"	2023	Josiah Van Dien	
"LITTLE ANIMAL"	2023	Val Astaire	
"SUPERNOVA"	2023	Val Astaire	
