= Sky Eats Airplane =

American post-hardcore band

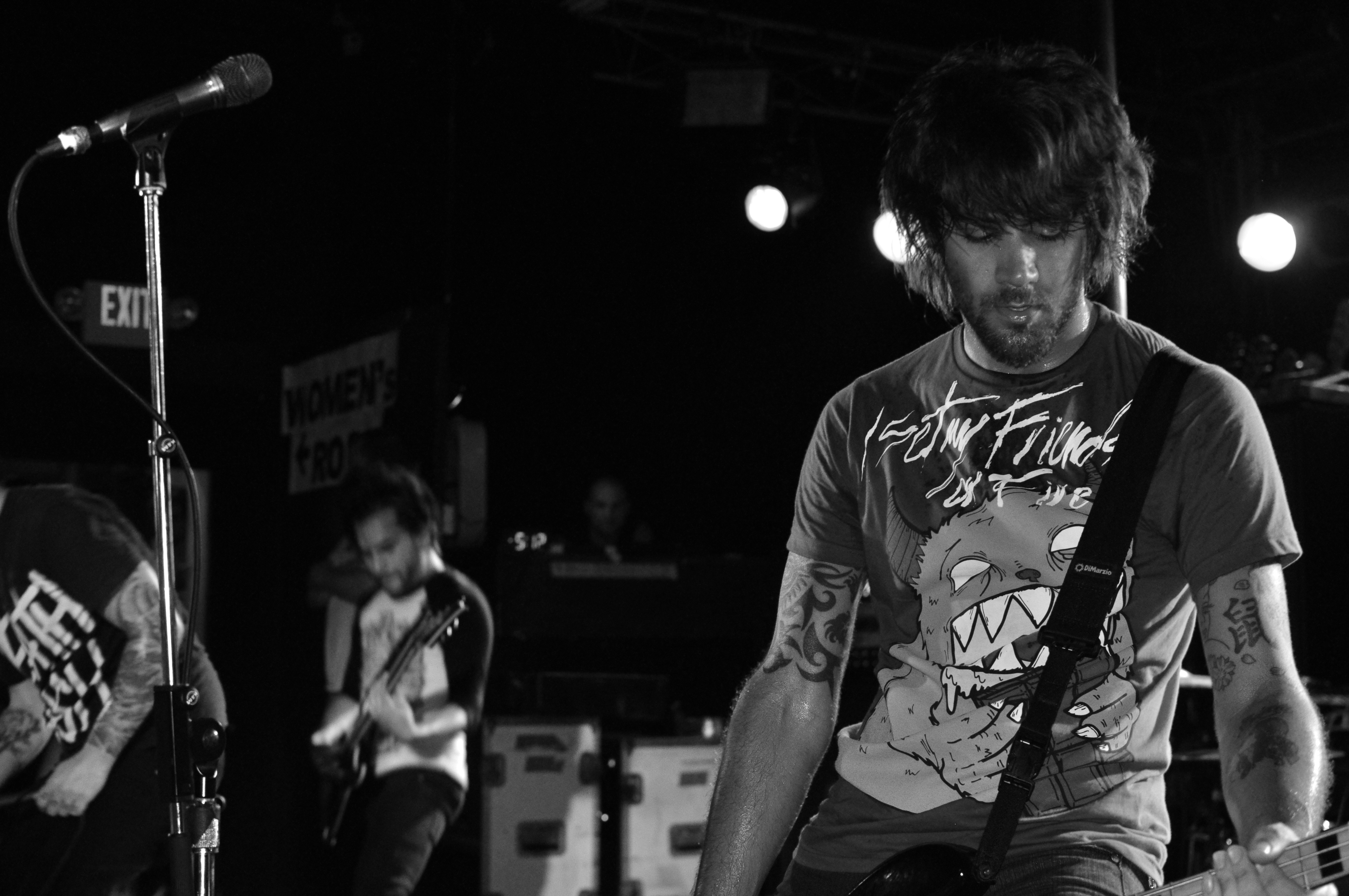
- Sky Eats Airplane live concert in 2010

Background information
- Origin: Fort Worth, Texas, U.S.
- Genres: Electronicore; post-hardcore; metalcore; Nintendocore (early)
- Years active: 2005–2011
- Labels: Equal Vision, Thriving, Tragic Hero
- Past members: Lee Duck; Brack Cantrell; Zack Ordway; Johno Erickson; Kenny Schick; Jerry Roush; Travis Orbin; Elliot Coleman; Bryan Zimmerman

Sky Eats Airplane was a post-hardcore band from Fort Worth, Texas. Formed in 2005 by Lee Duck and Brack Cantrell, the band independently released their debut album, Everything Perfect on the Wrong Day, in 2006. Shortly after the album's release, Cantrell left the group, which led to vocalist Jerry Roush, guitarist Zack Ordway, drummer Kenny Schick, and bassist Johno Erickson joining the band. After signing with Equal Vision Records, the band released their second studio album, Sky Eats Airplane, in 2008.

In 2009, lead vocalist Jerry Roush, drummer Kenny Schick, and bassist Johno Erickson left the group. Schick was replaced by former Periphery drummer Travis Orbin, Elliott Coleman replaced Erickson on bass while also providing backing vocals, and Bryan Zimmerman replaced Jerry Roush as the band's lead vocalist. The band released an EP, The Sound of Symmetry, in 2010. Later in the same year, the band abruptly parted ways with Zimmerman and became inactive. Although they had originally planned to release another full-length album, lead guitarist Zack Ordway confirmed in a 2011 interview that the group had officially disbanded, citing personal issues with Zimmerman and alleged neglect from their label and management.

== History ==
=== Formation, Everything Perfect on the Wrong Day, departure of Brack Cantrell (2005–2006) ===
Sky Eats Airplane was formed in 2005 by Arlington Heights High School students Brack Cantrell and Lee Duck, formerly of the band Our First Fall. When later asked about the meaning of the name Sky Eats Airplane, Duck replied: "It was just a counter to all the [...] band names that use the same five or six dark sounding words. [...] We just wanted something that was original and had imagery to it".

The band independently released their first album, Everything Perfect on the Wrong Day, on August 6, 2006. The album was self-produced by Cantrell and Duck, who also performed and programmed all the music in one bedroom. In late 2006, Brack left the band to concentrate on his solo work and explore other areas of music.

=== New lineup, Sky Eats Airplane, touring (2007–2009) ===
After Brack's departure, Duck recruited Zack Ordway on guitar, Kenny Schick on drums, and Johno Erickson on bass; all former members of In Theory. The band sent out an open call for singers via Myspace. They decided upon Jerry Roush from Hampton, Virginia. Roush had previously played drums in hardcore bands; the band marked his first attempt at being a front man. In 2007, the group signed a distribution agreement with Tragic Hero Records to re-release Everything Perfect on The Wrong Day.

On March 12, 2008, Sky Eats Airplane signed with Equal Vision Records. Around the same time, the band collaborated with producer Brian McTernan to record their follow-up album at his studio in Baltimore. On April 5, the group played the Bamboozle Left. Their self-titled album was released on July 22, 2008.

On May 3, the band played The Bamboozle in East Rutherford, New Jersey. The band co-headlined a national summer tour with A Skylit Drive, supported by Breathe Carolina and Memphis May Fire. The band also played on the Vans Warped Tour 2008 for three weeks.

=== Lineup changes, The Sound of Symmetry (2009–2010) ===
On January 11, 2009, Kenny Schick left the group to focus on matters involving his family. He was replaced by former Periphery drummer Travis Orbin. From March 14 to May 1, the band supported The Devil Wears Prada on their Sweet Brag Tour, alongside A Day to Remember and Emarosa.

In July, the band stated that they had parted ways with vocalist Jerry Roush on good terms, citing creative differences. In December, the band announced the addition of Bryan Zimmerman and Elliot Coleman on vocals. The band also disclosed the departure of bassist Johno Erickson, whom Coleman would replace on bass.

On April 13, 2010, Sky Eats Airplane released The Sound of Symmetry, a three-track EP. From July to early August, the band performed on the first annual Scream It Like You Mean It tour. In late August, the band announced that they had parted ways with vocalist Bryan Zimmerman.

=== Indefinite hiatus (2011–present) ===
On July 13, 2011, lead guitarist Zack Ordway confirmed in an interview that Sky Eats Airplane had officially disbanded. Ordway stated personal issues with the band's former lead vocalist, Bryan Zimmerman, "broke our spirits". He also accused the band's label and management of neglect.

In August 2020, Tragic Hero Records released Everything Perfect on the Wrong Day on vinyl. In October, founding members Lee Duck and Brack Cantrell gave an interview in which they discussed the album and their histories with the band. When asked if there was any chance for new Sky Eats Airplane music, Duck said "I would say there's a chance, yeah. I think that's the intent. But right now, at least for me, I'm definitely in an exploratory phase". Cantrell replied, "I would say there's a damn good chance. A damn good chance".

== Members ==
Final lineup

- Bryan Zimmerman – lead vocals (2009–2011)
- Zack Ordway – lead guitar, keyboards, programming (2006–2011)
- Lee Duck – rhythm guitar (2006–2011), keyboards, synthesizers, programming, piano, percussion, strings, backing vocals (2005–2011); lead guitar, bass, drums (2005–2006)
- Elliot Coleman – bass, backing vocals (2009–2011)
- Travis Orbin – drums, percussion (2009–2011)

Former members

- Brack Cantrell – lead vocals, rhythm guitar, keyboards, synthesizers, programming, piano, bass, drums, percussion (2005–2006)
- Johno Erickson – bass (2006–2009)
- Kenny Schick – drums, percussion (2006–2009)
- Jerry Roush – lead vocals (2006–2009)

Timeline

== Discography ==
=== Studio albums ===
Title	Album details	Chart Positions		
Title	Album details	US	US Heat	US Indie
Everything Perfect on the Wrong Day	Released: August 6, 2006; Label: Thriving Records/Tragic Hero; Formats: CD, digital download	—	—	—
Sky Eats Airplane	Released: July 22, 2008; Label: Equal Vision Records; Formats: CD, digital download	172	6	27

=== Extended plays ===
Title	EP details
The Sound of Symmetry	Released: April 13, 2010; Label: Equal Vision Records; Formats: digital download

=== Music videos ===
Year	Song	Album
2009	"Numbers"	Sky Eats Airplane

=== Non-album singles ===
Year	Song
2009	"Nookie" (Limp Bizkit cover)
