= Beth Cavener Stichter =

US fine artist

Beth Cavener
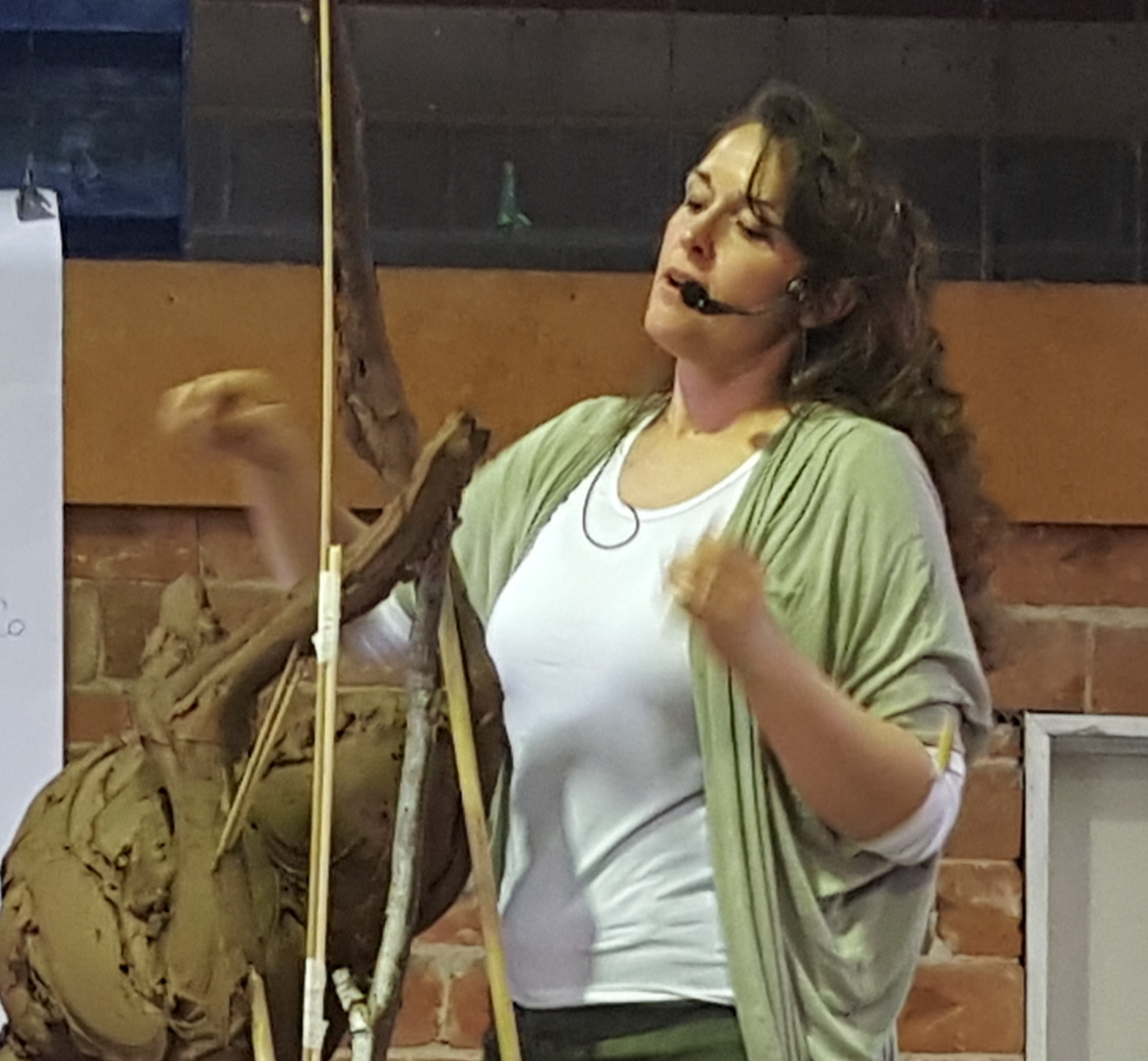
- Cavener in 2016
- Born: 25 November 1972 (age 53); Pasadena, California, United States
- Occupation: Sculptor
- Website: followtheblackrabbit.com

Beth Cavener, also known as Beth Cavener Stichter, is an American artist based out of Montana. A classically trained sculptor, her process involves building complex metal armatures to support massive amounts of clay. Cavener is best known for her fantastical animal figures, which embody the complexity of human emotion and behavior.

Cavener addresses controversial subject matter head on and in direct opposition to the reputation of her chosen medium, clay. The artist focuses her sculpture on human psychology, stripped of context and rationalization, and articulated through animal forms. As she states, "on the surface, these figures are simply feral animals suspended in a moment of tension. Beneath the surface, they embody the consequences of human fear, apathy, aggression, and misunderstanding". Her process is very physical, involving thousands of pounds clay sculpted using her whole body. Her work has earned many awards, and is exhibited in private galleries and public museums throughout the United States.

== Biography ==
Cavener was born in 1972 in Pasadena, California. Her father is a molecular biologist and inspired Cavener to study science up until college. She would work in his lab in the summers and says that she aspired to a career as an academic scientist. Her mother, Nancy Jacobsohn, a sculptor and an art teacher, taught Cavener how to work with clay starting at an early age and also did some painting. During her childhood, Cavener and her mother supported two horses, one of which was saved when Cavener was only 6. Cavener went on to pursue her studies in physics and astronomy at Haverford College in Pennsylvania. In her 3rd year, she traveled to Florence, Italy, where she attended the Cecil Academy of Art. Upon returning, Cavener suspended her studies in astrophysics in order to focus on perusing Fine Art. She received her BA in Sculpture in 1995.

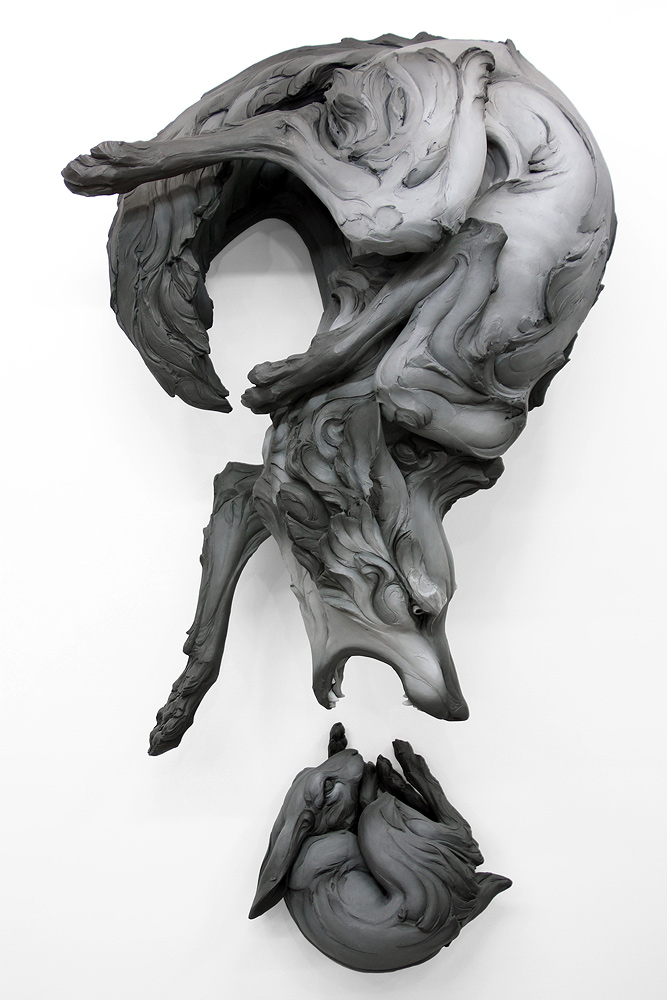
Title: "The Question That Devours" Year: 2012 Dimensions: H 64 x W 35 x D 25 in. Materials: Stoneware, paint Installation: Wall Piece

Cavener would spend the next few years honing her artistic style and research through a series of apprenticeships and fellowships. She continued her formal education at the Charles H. Cecil Studios in Florence, Italy. In Nashville, Tennessee, studying under the sculptor Alan LeQuire cavener progressed in bronze casting and mold making. Trained in the classical atelier style throughout her studies, Cavener became restless with the more traditional methods of sculpting and casting, focused exclusively on the human form. Returning to the raw material of clay, Cavener began developing a method of working solid on increasingly complex armatures that allowed her to explore more complex gestures. Cavener’s emergence into the art world was mirrored by her mother, who she displayed with in Nashville. Cavener's work around 1999 used insect forms, inspired by their prevalence in the scientific textbooks she was raised around. The insect forms addressed human emotions from a foreign form. Cavener spent four years in Columbus, Ohio, independently developing her work and searching for a conceptual link to her interest human psychology and social structures.

Cavener enrolled in graduate school at The Ohio State University, where she received her Master's in Fine Arts degree in ceramics between 2000 and 2002. Her thesis exhibition, "tremble shiver," made the transition from working with the human figure to using human-scaled portrayals of the animal body to express human emotion and psychological portraits. Cavener’s work in graduate school cemented her shift to animal forms. She assigned three animals to three archetypes of human personalities, a hare as the victim, a boar the bully, and a goat as the manipulator. These character types could be subverted and used to explore the viewer's position as the one assigning these roles.

After receiving her MFA, Cavener spent two years as a resident artist at the Archie Bray Foundation for the Ceramic Arts from 2000-2002, and then completed a brief Guest Artist residency at The Clay Studio in Philadelphia, Pennsylvania, in 2004. She then traveled for residencies in Jingdezhen, China (2008), La Meridiana, Certaldo, Italy (2012), and at the Shigaraki Ceramic Cultural Park in Shigaraki, Japan (2013). Cavener opened the exhibition, "The Other", in November 2017, with 5 new major pieces.

In addition to her full-time studio practice, Cavener opened a group professional studio space in 2014 under the name Studio 740 in Helena, MT, in order to mentor and support young emerging artists. She is vocal about the lack of funding for young artists and has completed two successful crowd-funding initiatives, one in partnership with United States Artists (USA) in 2011 and another self-directed initiative using Patreon, to support the artists in residence of Studio 740.

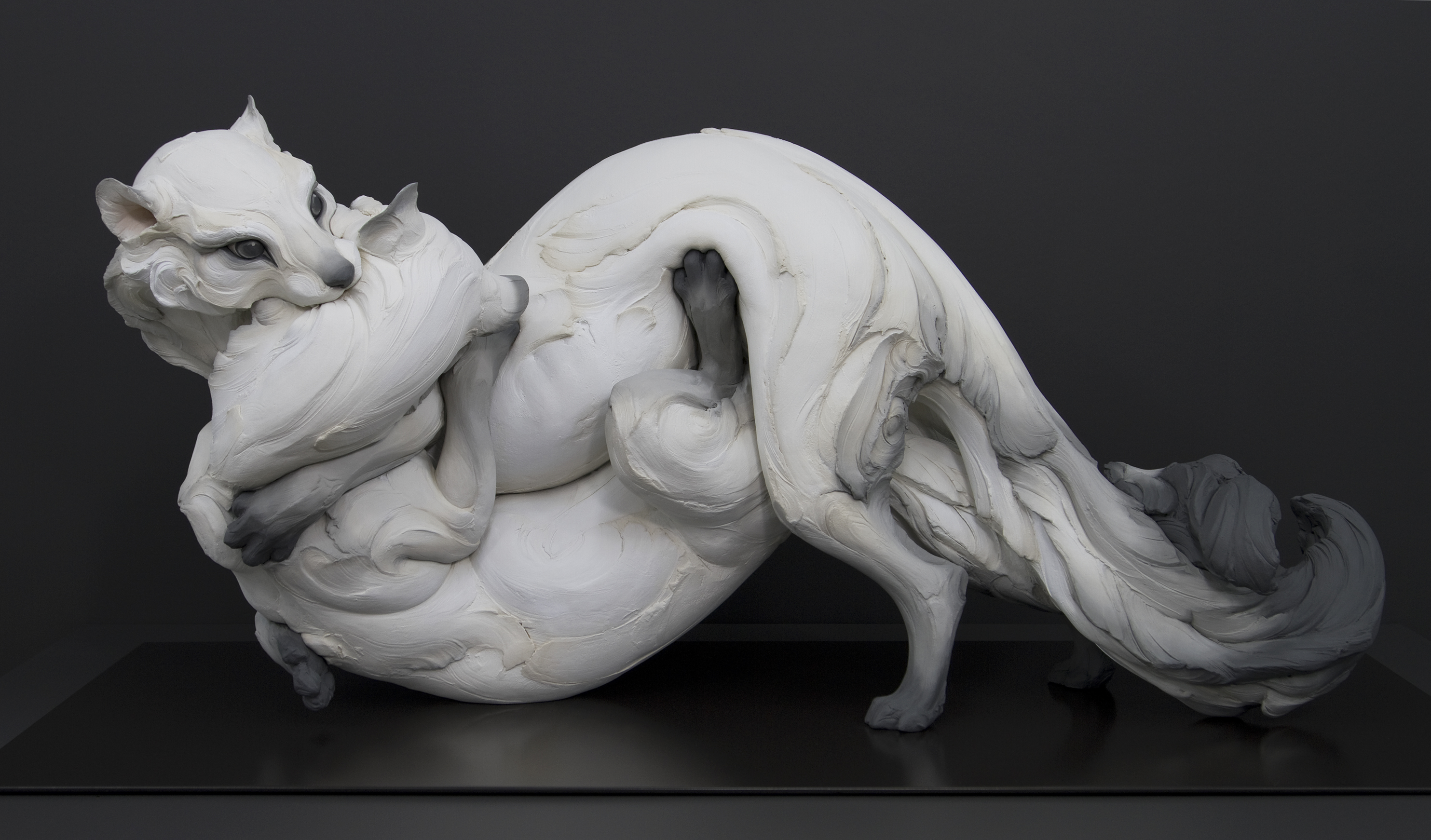
"Limerence" 2017 from the exhibition "The Other" 44 in. length, 22 in. height, 16 in. width Stoneware, Paint

== Work ==
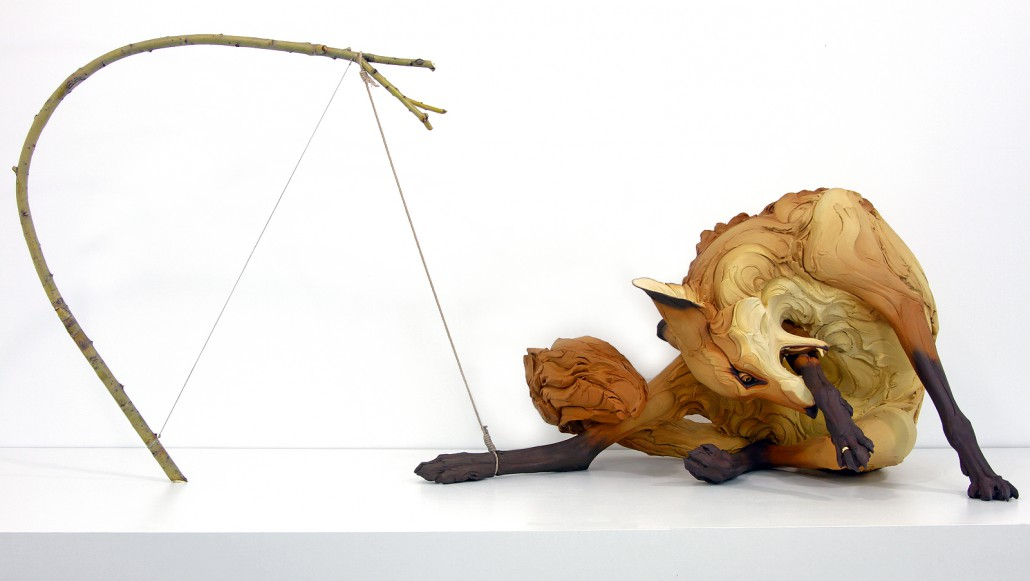
Title: "Trapped" Year: 2015 Dimensions: Figure: H 21 x L 37 x D 22 in. Materials: Stoneware, paint, 18 k gold, rope, wood

Cavener's sculptures are large and dynamic, evoking fear and anxiety that is distinctly human even though it is presented through animal forms. The body language of these animal forms are metaphors for how humans think and feel, and they act as a psychological portrait more than a physical representation. The animal bodies themselves are not realistic depictions of their real-life counterparts. The subjects can be viewed as anthropomorphized humans. Small details from human bone structures to human genitalia or belly buttons are added. The more subtle changes are meant to cause the viewer to subconsciously see the forms as human. Many of the changes made to the animal's anatomy lead the viewer to better connect and empathize with the sculpture. Using animals as subjects, Cavener accesses the perception of animals as nature-driven. By then imparting human expressions and emotions on these animals, a more complex depiction can be achieved.

In 2008, Cavener joined the Claire Oliver Gallery, where she opened a show called "On Tender Hooks" on October 22, 2009. In 2010, she had a show entitled "The Four Humors," inspired by the ancient Greek notion of being able to characterize one's personality by which "humor" they possessed in excess. Her last show with Claire Oliver, "Come Undone," was displayed in the fall of 2012.

Cavener’s art since 2019 has been influenced by contemporary events, along with her experiences raising her son. Cavener’s 2024 exhibition, Trust, held through Carpenters Workshop Gallery in partnership with Jason Jacques Gallery, presented a body of work that responded to political events and personal emotions from the era of the COVID-19 quarantines. The central form of the exhibit was Shards, a large male lion with a valiant solemn expression, reformed from shattered pieces. The process for creating the work involved around 1,300kg of clay and four years spent gluing the pieces together. The work explores the process of rebuilding trust in societal institutions, and the devotion the activity takes.

Her work is owned by many public collections, including the Honolulu Museum of Art, the Arizona State University Art Museum (Tempe), the Chazen Museum of Art (Madison, Wisconsin), the Museum of Fine Arts, Houston, the Northwest Museum of Arts and Culture (Spokane, Washington), the Racine Art Museum (Racine, Wisconsin), the Smithsonian American Art Museum (Washington DC), and the Tennessee State Museum (Nashville). She has promised gifts to the Metropolitan Museum of Art and the Museum of Art and Design, both in New York City, New York.

=== Process ===
Cavener's usual working method is building solid sculptures on metal armatures, often with 2,000 or more pounds of clay at a time, then cutting the piece into 30-160 sections, hollowing out each section out to 1/4" thickness, and reassembling the pieces before firing. In order to work on a larger scale, the reassembled hollow pieces are then cut again to fit inside the kiln, fired, and then reassembled with glues and epoxies. (A slideshow of this process can be seen on her website under the Materials and Techniques section). She usually paints the surface with flat interior latex paint. This allows her to fill in seams after reassembly and maintain the look and feel of clay. She has also uses the technique terra sigillata , or "sealed earth," a process in which clay is burnished to a glossy texture, which is how she achieves the luminous surface of her sculptures.

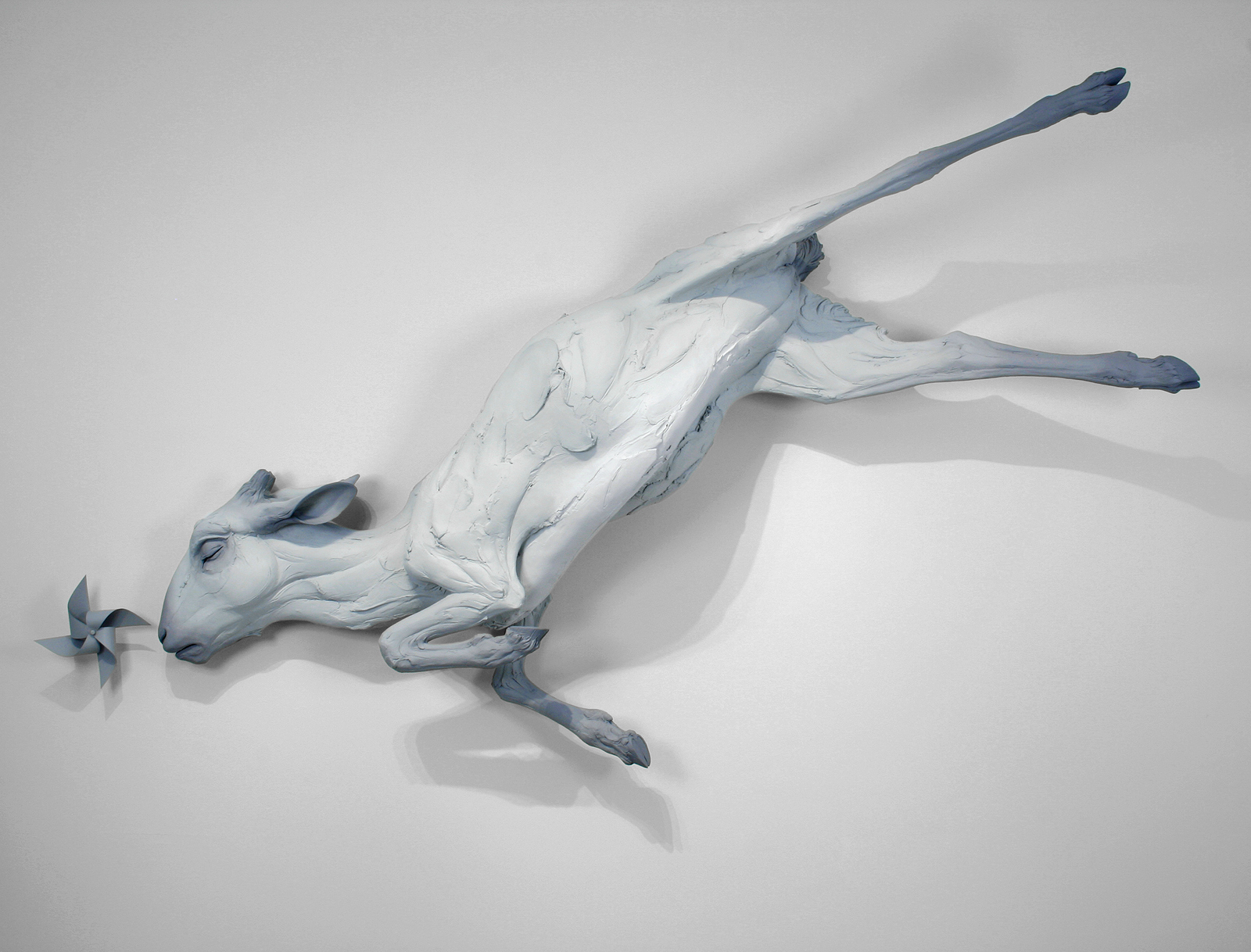
"A Second Kind of Loneliness" 2009 from the exhibititon "On Tender Hooks" Dimensions: H 64 x W 117 x D 22 in. Materials: Stoneware, paint, paper pinwheel, internal mechanical breathing device

Cavener shapes her stoneware animals in unexpected, and human-like, poses. Her "A Second Kind of Loneliness" from 2009, in the collection of the Honolulu Museum of Art, is an example of this. The hollow sculpture contains an internal mechanical breathing device that animates the pinwheel. By using this pinwheel mechanism, Cavener is able create an illusion of animation, which is why her sculptures seem to be suspended in a burst of activity. For "Come Undone," her 2012 show at the Claire Oliver Gallery, she explored mixed media, including handmade doilies for "The White Hind" and sugar crystals for "The Adoration." "Each piece in the show is a self-portrait representing different aspects of the artist's femininity." Stichter was quoted saying "I wanted to explore the idea of feminine sexuality and how difficult it is to express desire-passion in a woman without it being a taboo, or without it being seen as wanton."

== Awards ==
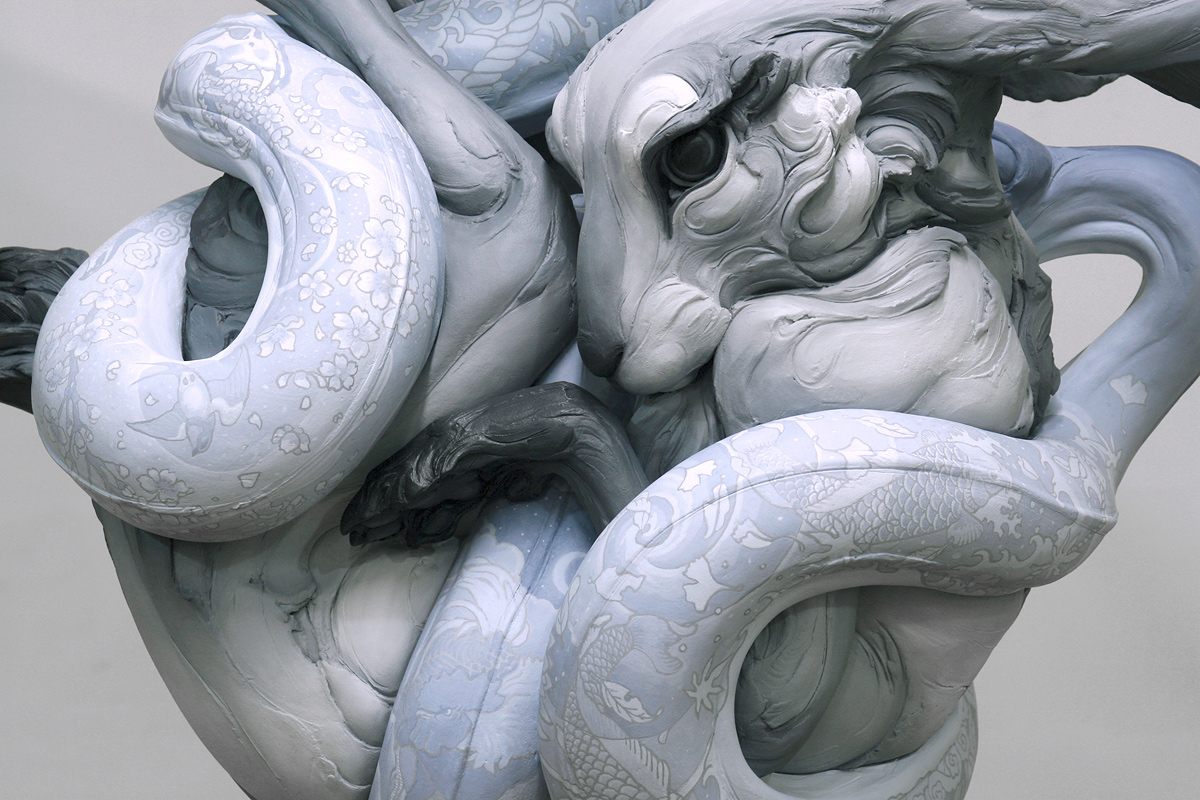
PreviousNext Title: "Tangled Up In You" Year: 2014 Dimensions: Figures: 65 inches height, 42 inches length and 24 inches wide. Installation: 15 feet from the top rope knot to the floor. Materials: Stoneware, ink, paint, rope Japanese style tattoo designed with and painted by Alessandro Gallo

- 2009 Artist Trust Individual Art Fellowship
- 2006 Jean Griffith Fellowship
- 2005 Virginia A. Groot Award, First Prize
- 2005 Individual Artist Fellowship, Ohio Arts Council
- 2003 Emerging Artist Grant, American Craft Council

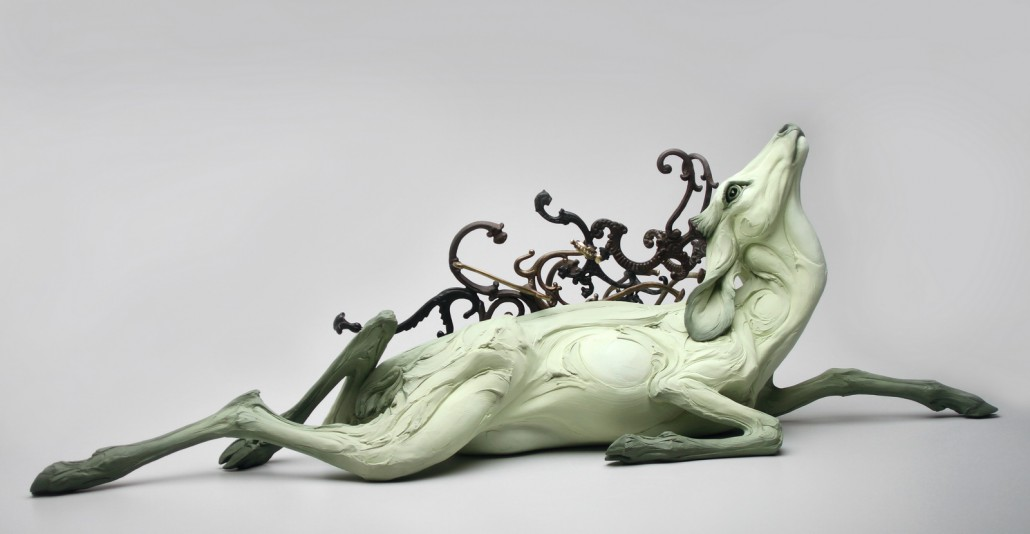
Title: "Obariyon" Year: 2013 Dimensions: H 17 x L 46 x D 30 in. Materials: Stoneware, antique hooks

== Exhibitions ==
=== Selected solo exhibitions ===
2017 "The Other" Jason Jacques, New York, NY
2012 "Come Undone" Claire Oliver Gallery, New York, NY
2010 "The Four Humors" Claire Oliver Gallery, New York, NY
2009 "On Tender Hooks" Claire Oliver Gallery, New York, NY
2008 "Apologia" Art Spirit Gallery, Coeur d'Alene, ID
2006 "A Modest Proposal" Garth Clark Gallery, New York, NY
2005 "The Wildness Within" G-Spot Gallery, NCECA, Baltimore, MD
2004 Contemporary Crafts Museum, ACC Grant Exhibition, Portland, OR
2003 "Animal Body, Human Space" Archie Bray Foundation, Helena, MT
2002 "tremble, shiver" MFA Exhibition, Columbus, OH
2000 Acme Art Company, Columbus, OH

=== Selected group exhibitions ===
2016 "Turn the Page: Ten Years of Hi-Fructose, The Virginia Museum of Contemporary Art, Virginia Beach, VA - traveling exhibition

2016 "Objectify (Cultured Animal)," Belger Arts Center, Kansas City, MO

2015 "Trophies and Prey: A Contemporary Bestiary," Peters Project Space, Santa Fe, NM
2015 "Barely Imagined Beings," Proto Gallery, Hoboken, NJ

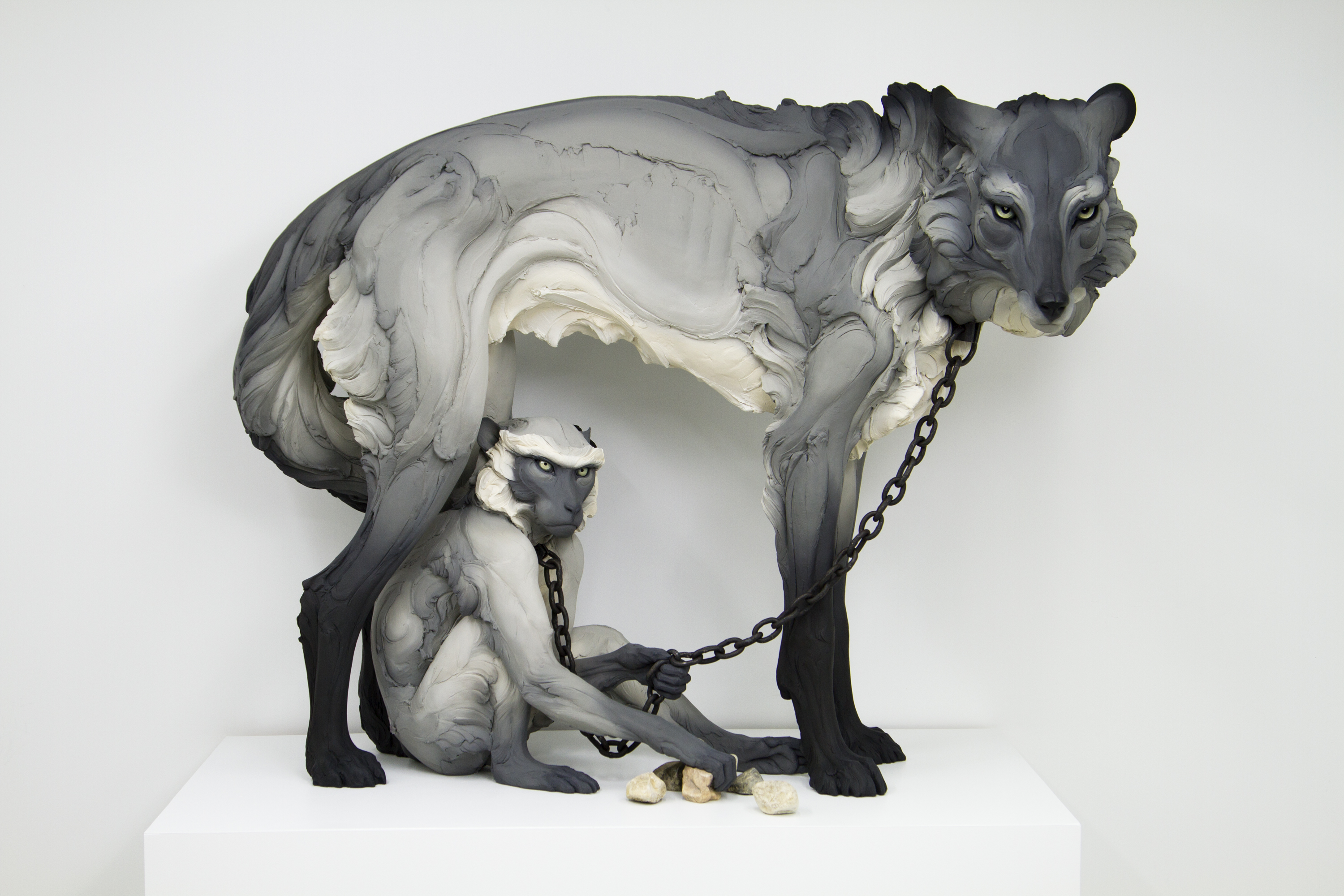
Title: "Tribute" from the exhibition "The Other" Year: 2017 Dimensions: Wolf: 58 in. length, 46 in. height, 31 in. width Materials: Stoneware, paint, hand-forged steel collars and chain

2014 "Barely Imagined Beings," Proto Gallery, Hoboken, NJ

2014 "The Human Condition," Chazen Museum of Art, Madison, 2014 "Flow," Milwaukee Museum of Art, Milwaukee, WI
2012-13 Animatopoeia: A Most Peculiar (Post Modern) Bestiary, The Galleries at Cleveland State University, Cleveland, OH
2012 10-20-10, Claire Oliver Gallery, New York, NY
2012 Sources and Influences, The Huntington Museum of Art, Huntington, WV
2012 2012 NCECA Invitational: Push Play, The Bellevue Arts Museum, Bellevue, WA
2011 Adrift, The Hyde Gallery at the Nesin Graduate Center, Memphis College of Art, Memphis, TN
2011 Jean Griffith Fellowship Fifth Anniversary Exhibition, Pottery Northwest, Seattle, WA
2010 Art Miami 2010, Claire Oliver Gallery, Miami
2007 From the Ground Up: The 2007 Renwick invitational, The Smithsonian Museum, Renwick Gallery, Washington DC
2007 Man and Beast, Garth Clark Gallery, New York, NY
2006 Sidney Myer Fund International Ceramics Award, Shepparton, Australia
2005 Dominion: Man in Nature, Cervini Haas Gallery/Gallery Materia, Scottsdale, AZ
2006 Animal Instincts, Baltimore Clayworks, Baltimore, MD
2005 fancical: Ceramic Artists and the Forms of Nature, Cresson Gallery, University of Wisconsin WI
2005 School's Out!, NCECA 2005, Catonsville Art Gallery, Baltimore, MD
2005 Clay Menagerie, Garth Clark Gallery, New York, NY
2005 A Tale to Tell: Contemporary Narratives in Clay, John Michael Kohler Arts Center, Sheboygan, WI
2005 NCECA 2005 Exhibition, Taipei County Yingge Ceramics Museum, Taipei, Taiwan
2004 NCECA 2004 Invitational: Biomimicry: The Art of Imitating Life, Herron Gallery, Indianapolis, IN
2004 As I See Myself: autobiographical Art, Kentucky Museum of Art and Design, Louisville, KY
2004 Viewpoint: Ceramics 2004, Grossmont College, El Cajon, CA
2004 Two Artist Exhibition with Chris Anteman, The Art Spirit Gallery, Coeur d'Alene, ID
2004 Alter Egos: Voices From Inside, Ohio Art league Gallery, Columbus, OH
2003 St. Petersburg Clay National Best of Show, St. Petersburg Clay, St. Petersburg, FL
2003 Wichita National 2003, Second Place, Wichita Center for the Arts, Wichita, KS
2003 ANA 32, Holter Museum of Art, Helena, MT
2003 NCECA National, David Zapf Gallery, San Diego, CA

== Publications ==
- Garth Clark, Human, The Art of Beth Cavener, Fresco Books/ SF Design, llc., 2019
- "Beth Cavener: Subliminal" by Kathleen Whitney, Ceramics Monthly Volume 63, 2015
- "Come Undone: The Sculptures of Beth Cavener Stichter" by Jen Pappas, Hi-Fructose Volume 26, 2013
- "Veiled Lures: The Sculptures of Beth Cavener Stichter" by J.L. Shnabel, Hi-Fructose Volume 16, 2012
- "Innovation & Change: Ceramics from the Arizona State University Art Museum" by Peter Held, Arizona State University Art Museum, 2009, ISBN 0-9817957-3-0
- "Confrontational Ceramics" by Judith Schwartz, University of Pennsylvania Press, August 2008, ISBN 978-0-8122-4139-6
- "Clay in Art International Yearbook 06/07" by Kostas Tarkasis (ed.), Clay Art International, 2008
- "A Human Impulse: Figuration from the Diane and Sandy Besser Collection" by Peter Held, Arizona State University Art Museum, 2008, ISBN 0-9777624-7-5
- "From the Ground Up: Renwick Craft Invitational 2007" by Jane Milosch and Suzanne Frantz, Smithsonian American Art Museum, 2007, ISBN 0-9790678-1-2
- "Beth Cavener Stichter" by Garth Clark, New York: Garth Clark Gallery, 2006
- 500 Animals in Clay: Contemporary Expressions of the Animal Form by Joe Bova, Lark Books, November 2006, ISBN 978-1-57990-757-0
- 500 Figures in Clay: Ceramic Artists Celebrate the Human Form by Veronika Alice Gunter, Lark Books, September 2004, ISBN 978-1-57990-547-7
