= Jerry Roush =

American musician (born 1986)

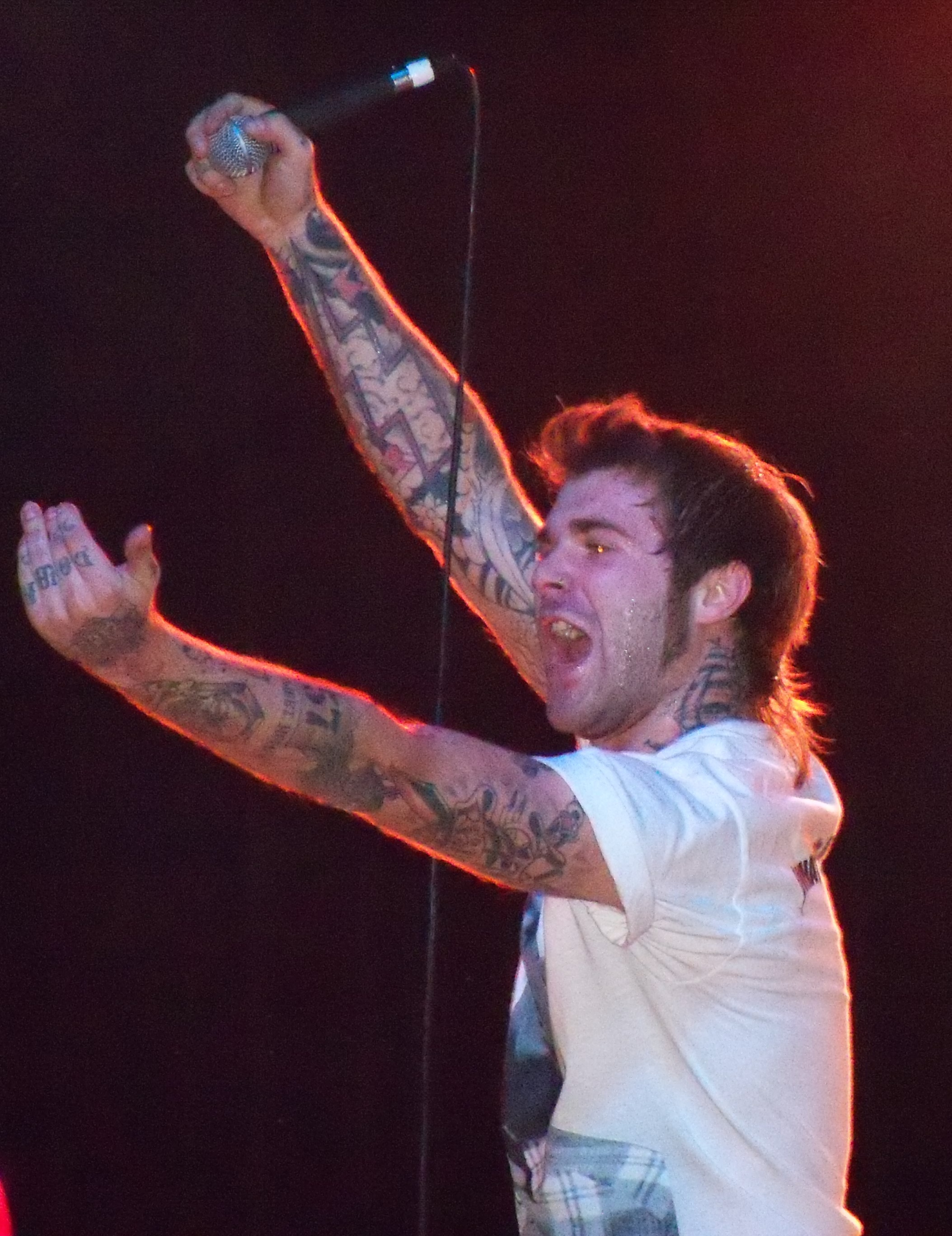
- Roush performing as a part of Of Mice & Men in 2010.

Background information
- Born: Gerald Allen Roush; November 15, 1986 (age 39)
- Origin: Hampton, Virginia, U.S.
- Genres: Metalcore; progressive metal; electronicore; post-hardcore
- Occupations: Singer; musician; talent manager
- Instruments: Vocals; guitar; drums; keyboard; bass
- Years active: 2007–2015
- Labels: Rise; Equal Vision
- Formerly of: Sky Eats Airplane; Of Mice & Men; Glass Cloud

Gerald Allen "Jerry" Roush (born November 15, 1986) is an American musician, best known as the former vocalist for Sky Eats Airplane, Of Mice & Men, and Glass Cloud. He has also served as a substitute vocalist for American Me during their Japan tour.

== Musical career ==
=== Sky Eats Airplane (2006–2009) ===
After answering a national casting call to join the fledgling metalcore band, Sky Eats Airplane, Roush was announced as the permanent vocalist. He was in the band from 2006 to 2009, and was featured on their self-titled second studio album. After being in the band for almost three years, co-founder of Sky Eats Airplane, Lee Duck, announced that Roush would be leaving the band. Duck stated that the "creative differences..." between Roush and Sky Eats Airplane were "the best option for everyone."

=== Of Mice & Men, American Me (2010–2011) ===
When Austin Carlile, lead singer of Of Mice & Men, was forced to refrain from touring due to heart surgery, the band asked Roush to substitute for Carlile while they played on Alesana's The Emptiness Tour. Roush was featured on the band's cover of "Blame It", originally performed by Jamie Foxx and T-Pain, which was released on the Fearless Records compilation album Punk Goes Pop 3.

Roush's membership with the band lasted several months until Alternative Press announced on January 3, 2011, that Carlile would be returning to Of Mice & Men along with collaborator, Alan Ashby. This had Roush without a musical project for little more than a month, until it was announced on Roush's Twitter that he would be filling-in on vocals for the band American Me on their tour in Japan.

=== Glass Cloud (2011–2015) ===
Roush eventually formed the band Glass Cloud with The Tony Danza Tapdance Extravaganza guitarist Josh Travis, and announced that they would enter the studio by November 2011 to record their debut, full-length album expecting a release in March 2012. Glass Cloud announced on April 20, 2012 that their debut album, The Royal Thousand, would be released on July 3, 2012 and would feature the songs from their double single, "White Flag" and "Counting Sheep." It was eventually released on July 10, 2012.

Glass Cloud's second release, Perfect War Forever, was released on October 23, 2013.

== Discography ==
With Sky Eats Airplane

- Sky Eats Airplane (Equal Vision Records, 2008)

With Of Mice & Men

- "Blame It (Jamie Foxx cover)", on Punk Goes Pop 3 (Fearless Records, 2010)

With Glass Cloud

- The Royal Thousand (Equal Vision Records & Basick Records, 2012)
- Perfect War Forever (Equal Vision Records & Basick Records, 2013)
