= Versus (Emarosa album) =

Studio album by Emarosa
- Released: September 5, 2014
- Recorded: 2013–2014
- Studios: Salad Days Studio, Baltimore, Maryland, U.S.
- Genres: Alternative rock; post-hardcore
- Length: 40:15
- Label: Rise
- Producer: Brian McTernan

Emarosa chronology
| Emarosa (2010) | Versus (2014) | 131 (2016) |

Singles from Versus
- 1. "Mad" Released: April 24, 2014; 2. "American Déjà Vu" Released: July 31, 2014; 3. "People Like Me, We Just Don't Play" Released: August 26, 2014

Versus is the third studio album by American rock band Emarosa. The album was released on September 5, 2014 through Rise Records and was produced by Brian McTernan. It is the band's last album to be released on this label. It is also the first album to feature vocalist Bradley Walden and the last to feature rhythm guitarist Jonas Ladekjaer, bassist Will Sowers, and drummer Lukas Koszewski.

Professional ratings
Review scores
| Source | Rating |
|---|---|
| AllMusic | 3.5/5 stars |

== Track listing ==
| No. | Title | Length |
|---|---|---|
| 1. | "People Like Me, We Just Don't Play" | 3:26 |
| 2. | "American Déjà Vu" | 3:42 |
| 3. | "A Hundred Crowns" | 3:26 |
| 4. | "I'll Just Wait" | 3:30 |
| 5. | "But You Won't Love a Ghost" | 3:55 |
| 6. | "Say Hello to the Bad Guy" | 3:48 |
| 7. | "Cliff Notes" | 3:45 |
| 8. | "Mad" | 3:16 |
| 9. | "Gold Dust" | 3:35 |
| 10. | "Same Tight Rope" | 3:59 |
| 11. | "1996 on Bevard" | 3:48 |
| Total length: | | 40:15 |

== Personnel ==
Credits adapted from AllMusic.

Emarosa

- Bradley Walden – lead vocals
- ER White – lead guitar
- Jonas Ladekjaer – rhythm guitar
- Will Sowers – bass
- Lukas Koszewski – drums
- Jordan Stewart – keyboards

Additional personnel

- Brian McTernan – production, engineering, mixing
- Will Beasley – assistant engineering
- Paul Leavitt – mixing
- Ryan Smith – mastering
- Glenn Thomas – illustrations, layout
